= Croxall (disambiguation) =

Croxall may refer to:

- Croxall (surname)
- Croxall, Derbyshire and Staffordshire, England, UK; a parish
  - Croxall Hall, a manor house
  - Croxall railway station
- Croxall Lakes, Staffordshire, England, UK; a nature reserve
