= Grade II* listed buildings in Lichfield (district) =

There are over 20,000 Grade II* listed buildings in England. This page is a list of these buildings in the district of Lichfield in Staffordshire.

== Lichfield ==
Name	Location	Type	Completed (Note: The date given is the date used by Historic England as significant for the initial building or that of an important part in the structure's description.)	Date designated	Grid ref. (Note: Sometimes known as OSGB36, the grid reference is based on the British national grid reference system used by the Ordnance Survey.) Geo-coordinates	Entry number (Note: The "List Entry Number" is a unique number assigned to each listed building and scheduled monument by Historic England.)	Image
Church of St John	Armitage with Handsacre, Lichfield	Parish Church	1632	27 February 1964	SK0772016484; 52°44′45″N 1°53′13″W	1374295	Church of St John More images
Church of St Anne	Chasetown, Burntwood, Lichfield	Chapel of Ease	1865	11 October 1984	SK0439109346; 52°40′54″N 1°56′11″W	1188075	Church of St Anne More images
Conduit Head at SK 0923 0928	Maple Hayes, Burntwood, Lichfield	Conduit Head	Mid 12th century	15 January 1988	SK0923009280; 52°40′52″N 1°51′54″W	1038874	Upload Photo
Clifton Hall	Clifton Campville, Lichfield	Country House	Early 18th century	27 February 1964	SK2635610994; 52°41′46″N 1°36′41″W	1038809	Clifton Hall
Former Coach House and Stable Block to Clifton Hall	Clifton Campville, Lichfield	Stable	Early 18th century	27 February 1964	SK2638011062; 52°41′48″N 1°36′40″W	1374279	Upload Photo
Church of St Mary	Colton, Lichfield	Parish Church	Early 13th century	27 February 1964	SK0475620412; 52°46′53″N 1°55′51″W	1190499	Church of St Mary More images
Colton House	Colton, Lichfield	House	c. 1730	9 March 1953	SK0491020464; 52°46′54″N 1°55′43″W	1038774	Colton House More images
Church of St Peter	Drayton Bassett, Lichfield	Parish Church	15th century	27 February 1964	SK1929600209; 52°35′58″N 1°43′00″W	1374280	Church of St Peter More images
Chetwynd Bridge (that part in Edingale Civil Parish)	Edingale, Lichfield	Road Bridge	1824	9 March 1953	SK1880113916; 52°43′21″N 1°43′23″W	1038893	Chetwynd Bridge (that part in Edingale Civil Parish) More images
Church of St John the Baptist	Croxall, Edingale, Lichfield	Church	18th century	27 February 1964	SK1975913634; 52°43′12″N 1°42′32″W	1188243	Church of St John the Baptist More images
Croxall Hall and attached Garden Wall	Croxall, Edingale, Lichfield	House	Late 16th century	9 February 1953	SK1967013750; 52°43′16″N 1°42′37″W	1038822	Croxall Hall and attached Garden Wall More images
Church of St Peter	Elford, Lichfield	Parish Church	Medieval	20 November 1986	SK1852310609; 52°41′34″N 1°43′39″W	1038899	Church of St Peter More images
Church of St Bartholomew	Farewell, Farewell and Chorley, Lichfield	Parish Church	c. 1300	27 February 1964	SK0832311622; 52°42′08″N 1°52′42″W	1374273	Church of St Bartholomew More images
Farewell Hall	Farewell, Farewell and Chorley, Lichfield	Farmhouse	Early 18th century	9 March 1953	SK0821111647; 52°42′09″N 1°52′48″W	1188143	Farewell Hall More images
Chetwynd Bridge (that part in Alrewas)	Fradley and Streethay, Lichfield	Road Bridge	1824	9 March 1953	SK1879113918; 52°43′21″N 1°43′24″W	1038893	Chetwynd Bridge (that part in Alrewas) More images
Hamstall Hall	Hamstall Ridware, Lichfield	Country House	15th century	9 March 1953	SK1050719354; 52°46′18″N 1°50′45″W	1038777	Hamstall Hall More images
Gatehouse and attached Courtyard Walls at Hamstall Hall	Hamstall Ridware, Lichfield	Gatehouse	Late 16th century	27 February 1964	SK1048219424; 52°46′20″N 1°50′46″W	1190607	Gatehouse and attached Courtyard Walls at Hamstall Hall More images
Tower and attached Walls at Hamstall Hall	Hamstall Ridware, Lichfield	Tower	Late 15th century	27 February 1964	SK1054019378; 52°46′19″N 1°50′43″W	1374300	Tower and attached Walls at Hamstall Hall More images
Chapel immediately East of Haselour Hall	Haselour, Harlaston, Lichfield	Chapel	14th century	27 February 1964	SK2067910773; 52°41′39″N 1°41′44″W	1038793	Upload Photo
Church of St Matthew	Harlaston, Lichfield	Parish Church	Early 13th century	27 February 1963	SK2150210957; 52°41′45″N 1°41′00″W	1038795	Church of St Matthew More images
Haselour Hall	Haselour, Harlaston, Lichfield	Country House	Late 16th century	9 March 1953	SK2064110764; 52°41′39″N 1°41′46″W	1188444	Upload Photo
Church of St Mary and St Giles and All Saints	Canwell, Hints, Lichfield	Chapel of Ease	1911	27 February 1964	SK1410300520; 52°36′08″N 1°47′36″W	1374260	Church of St Mary and St Giles and All Saints More images
1-12 and 12a Vicars' Close (flats) and Vicars' Hall	Lichfield	Apartment	1994	5 February 1952	SK1140409734; 52°41′07″N 1°49′58″W	1194880	Upload Photo
Angel Croft Hotel and attached Outbuilding, Front Railings and Gates	Lichfield	Gate	c. 1750	5 February 1952	SK1136509716; 52°41′06″N 1°50′00″W	1187354	Angel Croft Hotel and attached Outbuilding, Front Railings and Gates More images
Bastion to North East Angle and attached Walls of Garden of Former Episcopal Palace	Lichfield, Lichfield	Garden Wall	Late 17th century	6 March 1970	SK1155709918; 52°41′13″N 1°49′50″W	1194878	Upload Photo
Cathedral Visitors' Study Centre and attached Wall and Gate	Lichfield	Gate	Late 17th century	5 February 1952	SK1164109737; 52°41′07″N 1°49′45″W	1218787	Upload Photo
Christ Church	Leamonsley, Lichfield	Church	1844-47	6 March 1970	SK1086709313; 52°40′53″N 1°50′27″W	1209813	Christ Church More images
Church of St Chad	Stowe, Lichfield	Tower	Late 13th century	5 February 1952	SK1220410209; 52°41′22″N 1°49′15″W	1298398	Church of St Chad More images
Church of St Mary	Lichfield	Church	Medieval	5 February 1952	SK1176109547; 52°41′01″N 1°49′39″W	1292270	Church of St Mary More images
Church of St Michael	Lichfield	Tower	14th century	5 February 1952	SK1238109510; 52°40′59″N 1°49′06″W	1292420	Church of St Michael More images
Cruck House	Lichfield	House	1971	6 March 1970	SK1208709914; 52°41′12″N 1°49′21″W	1194899	Cruck House
Donegal House (Tourist Information Centre) and attached Railings	Lichfield	House	1730	5 February 1952	SK1177609485; 52°40′59″N 1°49′38″W	1209722	Donegal House (Tourist Information Centre) and attached Railings More images
Dr Johnson Statue	Lichfield	Statue	1938	5 February 1952	SK1174209561; 52°41′01″N 1°49′40″W	1217846	Dr Johnson Statue More images
George Hotel	Lichfield	Coaching Inn	Late 18th century	5 February 1952	SK1159009479; 52°40′58″N 1°49′48″W	1298735	George Hotel More images
Lichfield War Memorial	Lichfield	War memorial	1920	5 February 1952	SK1150209638	1187733	Lichfield War Memorial More images
Milley's Hospital	Lichfield	Almshouse	Post 1504	5 February 1952	SK1135509759; 52°41′07″N 1°50′00″W	1187347	Milley's Hospital More images
Numbers 1-9a Newton's College and attached Gate Pier	Lichfield	Gate Pier	1800-3	5 February 1952	SK1145109691; 52°41′05″N 1°49′55″W	1194875	Numbers 1-9a Newton's College and attached Gate Pier More images
St John's Preparatory School and attached Garden Wall	Lichfield	House	Mid to late 18th century	5 February 1952	SK1171309260; 52°40′51″N 1°49′41″W	1292101	St John's Preparatory School and attached Garden Wall More images
St Mary's Chambers	Lichfield	House	c. 1760	5 February 1952	SK1173809524; 52°41′00″N 1°49′40″W	1292482	St Mary's Chambers More images
St Mary's House and attached Wall, The Close	Lichfield	House	Pre 1300	5 February 1952	SK1167109782; 52°41′08″N 1°49′44″W	1218902	Upload Photo
Stowe Hill	Lichfield	House	1750s	5 February 1952	SK1235510354; 52°41′27″N 1°49′07″W	1298772	Upload Photo
Stowe House	Stowe, Lichfield	House	c. 1750	6 March 1970	SK1230010200; 52°41′22″N 1°49′10″W	1187731	Stowe House More images
The Deanery and attached Gate, The Close	Lichfield	Deanery	c. 1707	5 February 1952	SK1151109813; 52°41′09″N 1°49′52″W	1194879	The Deanery and attached Gate, The Close More images
No 5, The Close	Lichfield	House	Early 18th century	5 February 1952	SK1144909707; 52°41′06″N 1°49′55″W	1194869	No 5, The Close More images
No 6, The Close	Lichfield	Clergy House	Early 18th century	5 February 1952	SK1145509710; 52°41′06″N 1°49′55″W	1298427	No 6, The Close More images
No 7, The Close	Lichfield	Timber Framed House	15th century	5 February 1952	SK1146209714; 52°41′06″N 1°49′55″W	1218470	No 7, The Close More images
No 10, The Close	Lichfield	House	16th century	5 February 1952	SK1145109741; 52°41′07″N 1°49′55″W	1194871	No 10, The Close More images
Nos. 23a and 23b, The Close and attached Wall and Gate	Lichfield	House	Late 15th century	5 February 1952	SK1150909688; 52°41′05″N 1°49′52″W	1218599	Upload Photo
Number 24, The Close and attached Wall and Gate Pier	Lichfield	House	c. 1461	5 February 1952	SK1148709689; 52°41′05″N 1°49′53″W	1298430	Number 24, The Close and attached Wall and Gate Pier
No 20, St John Street	Lichfield	House	c. 1700	5 February 1952	SK1167609322; 52°40′53″N 1°49′43″W	1292115	Upload Photo
32 Bore Street	Lichfield	House	Late 16th century	5 February 1952	SK1177709461; 52°40′58″N 1°49′38″W	1292495	32 Bore Street More images
Church of St James	Longdon, Lichfield	Parish Church	12th century	27 February 1964	SK0821714163; 52°43′30″N 1°52′47″W	1248990	Church of St James More images
Hanch Hall	Longdon, Lichfield	House	C16/C17	27 February 1964	SK1004213970; 52°43′24″N 1°51′10″W	1248899	Upload Photo
Hill Top Cottages & Thatched Cottage	Hill Top, Longdon, Lichfield	Aisled House	Post 1399	27 February 1964	SK0896214098; 52°43′28″N 1°52′07″W	1248894	Upload Photo
Hill Top Farmhouse	Hill Top, Longdon, Lichfield	Farmhouse	Mid to late 17th century	27 February 1964	SK0900214089; 52°43′28″N 1°52′05″W	1277717	Upload Photo
High Bridge	Mavesyn Ridware, Lichfield	Road Bridge	1830	9 March 1953	SK0919916757; 52°44′54″N 1°51′55″W	1190422	High Bridge More images
Old Hall	Mavesyn Ridware, Lichfield	House	18th century	9 March 1953	SK0811516748; 52°44′54″N 1°52′52″W	1248906	Upload Photo
The Old Rectory and attached Walls and Gate Piers	Rake End, Mavesyn Ridware, Lichfield	House	c. 1728	9 March 1953	SK0776218225; 52°45′42″N 1°53′11″W	1277601	The Old Rectory and attached Walls and Gate Piers More images
Church Tower approximately 100 Metres North of Church of St John	Shenstone, Lichfield	Tower	13th century	27 February 1964	SK1094404382; 52°38′13″N 1°50′23″W	1038830	Upload Photo
Shenstone Hall	Shenstone, Lichfield	Farmhouse	17th century	9 March 1953	SK1131304782; 52°38′26″N 1°50′03″W	1188184	Upload Photo
Swinfen Hall and attached Steps and Terraces	Swinfen and Packington, Lichfield	Country House	1755	26 February 1982	SK1344605979; 52°39′05″N 1°48′10″W	1038838	Swinfen Hall and attached Steps and Terraces More images
Church of All Saints	Statfold, Thorpe Constantine, Lichfield	Chapel	12th century	27 February 1964	SK2377207171; 52°39′42″N 1°39′00″W	1294722	Upload Photo
Whittington Old Hall	Whittington, Lichfield	House	Late medieval	9 March 1953	SK1622908235; 52°40′18″N 1°45′41″W	1038870	Whittington Old Hall More images
