= Listed buildings in Edingale =

Edingale is a civil parish in the district of Lichfield, Staffordshire, England. It contains 19 buildings that are recorded in the National Heritage List for England. Of these, three are listed at Grade II*, the middle of the three grades, and the others are at Grade II, the lowest grade. The parish contains the village of Edingale and the settlement of Croxall, and is otherwise rural. The listed buildings include two churches, memorials in one of the churchyards, a large house with an associated dovecote, smaller houses, cottages, farmhouses and farm buildings, the earliest of which are timber framed, and a bridge.

== Key ==
Grade	Criteria
II*	Particularly important buildings of more than special interest
II	Buildings of national importance and special interest

== Buildings ==
Name and location	Photograph	Date	Notes	Grade
St John the Baptist's Church, Croxall; 52.72003°N 1.70902°W		c. 1200	The oldest part of the church is the chancel. The church was largely rebuilt in the 13th century, remodelled in the 14th century, and there were later alterations. It is built in stone with some brick, and consists of a nave, a chancel with a northeast vestry, and a west tower. The tower has two stages of different dates, a pointed west window, a moulded string course, and an embattled parapet.	II*
The Old School House; 52.70652°N 1.68957°W	—	Late 15th century	The house was later remodelled and extended, and in the 19th century a schoolroom was added. The house is timber framed with brick infill, the schoolroom is in red brick, and the roofs are tiled. The house has two storeys and a T-shaped plan, with a single-bay hall range, and a single-bay gabled cross-wing on the left, and there is a 19th-century kitchen range to the south. The schoolroom to the right has one storey, an eaves band, buttresses, and four bays. The windows in both parts are casements.	II
Croxall Hall and garden wall 52.72101°N 1.71039°W		Late 16th century	A large house that was restored and extended in 1868 by Joseph Potter. It is in red brick with sandstone dressings on a plinth, and has a tile roof with coped verges on shaped kneelers. There are two storeys and an L-shaped plan, with a front range and an east wing, both with three bays. In the centre of the front is a two-storey gabled porch with a four-centred arched opening. and a doorway with a moulded surround and a hood mould. The windows are mullioned and transomed. The south front has five bays, and contains a two-storey bay window with an embattled parapet. Attached to the north of the house is a brick garden wall with stone coping, including a doorway with a Tudor arch and a gateway flanked by stone piers with ball finials.	II*
Dovecote, Croxall Hall; 52.72154°N 1.71171°W	—	Late 16th century (probable)	The dovecote is in the grounds of the hall, it is in red brick with diapering, on a plinth, and has a dentilled band. The tile roof is hipped, and is surmounted by a domed octagonal cupola and a weathervane. The dovecote has a square plan, and it contains a Tudor arched window on each side.	II
4 Schoefield Lane; 52.70629°N 1.68202°W	—	1641	A timber framed cottage with brick infill and a tile roof. There are two storeys, and on the front are a doorway, a fixed window, with a casement window above, and a small square window to the right.	II
1 Schoefield Lane; 52.70668°N 1.68196°W	—	17th century	The cottage was altered in the 19th and 20th centuries. The original part is timber framed with plastered brick infill, the rebuilding is in plastered brick, and the roof is tiled. There is one storey and an attic, and on the front is a doorway, a casement window, and a gabled dormer.	II
2 Schoefield Lane; 52.70661°N 1.68197°W	—	17th century	The cottage was altered in the 19th century. The original part is timber framed with brick infill, the rebuilding is in brick, and the roof is tiled. There are two storeys, and a single-storey brick extension. On the front is a lean-to porch, and the windows are casements.	II
3 Schoefield Lane; 52.70646°N 1.68200°W	—	17th century	The house was altered and extended in the 19th century. The original part is timber framed with brick infill, the extensions are in brick, and the roof is tiled. There is one storey and an attic, three bays, and a single-storey brick extension to the right. On the front is a gabled porch, the windows are casements, and there are two gabled dormers.	II
Barn northeast of Poplars Farm; 52.70524°N 1.66074°W	—	17th century	The barn is timber framed with brick infill and a tile roof. There is one storey and three bays, and it contains full-height barn doors.	II
Church Farmhouse and outbuildings 52.70633°N 1.68302°W	—	1664	The farmhouse was extended and outbuildings were added in 1819. The original part is timber framed, the extensions are in brick, and the roof is tiled and hipped to the right. The building has a T-shaped plan, with the original part forming a cross-wing to the left, the extension to the right, and the outbuildings continuing to the right in the same line. The cross-wing has two storeys and a attic, and the extension has two storeys and three bays. The doorway has a pediment, and the windows are casements with segmental heads. The outbuildings contain a carriage arch with a keystone, and doorways and windows with segmental heads.	II
Former stable northwest of The Old Vicarage; 52.70644°N 1.68412°W	—	Early 18th century	The former stable, which was later extended, is timber framed, the extension is in brick, and the roof is tiled. There is one storey and a loft, and two bays. On the south side are two carriage doors, and the windows are casements.	II
The Old Vicarage, Church Lane; 52.70624°N 1.68409°W	—	Early to mid 18th century	The former vicarage is in red brick with a floor band, a moulded eaves cornice, and a tile roof. There are two storeys and an attic, five bays, and a recessed single-storey extension with a hipped roof to the right. In the centre is a gabled porch, and the windows are casements.	II
Raddle Farmhouse; 52.72020°N 1.66557°W	—	Mid 18th century	A red brick farmhouse with a dentilled eaves band and a tile roof. There are two storeys and an attic, and three bays, the middle bay projecting under a pediment. The central doorway has a fanlight and a bracketed cornice hood, and the windows are casements with segmental heads.	II
Oakley Farmhouse; 52.71719°N 1.71577°W	—	Late 18th century	A red brick farmhouse with dentilled eaves and a tile roof. There are three storeys and an L-shaped plan, consisting of a three-bay main range, a rear wing, and a single-storey single-bay wing to the left. The central doorway has a fanlight, the windows in the ground floor are sashes, and in the upper floors they are casements.	II
The Firs, Croxall Road; 52.70710°N 1.68592°W	—	Late 18th century	A red brick house with a dentilled eaves band and a slate roof. There are three storeys and an L-shaped plan, with a front range of three bays, and a rear wing. In the centre is a doorway with a rectangular fanlight and a pediment, and the windows are sashes with segmental heads. In the angle between the ranges is a canted porch, and at the rear is another canted porch with two storeys, and a doorway with pilasters, a fanlight, and a pediment.	II
Group of three memorials 52.72005°N 1.70921°W	—	Late 18th to early 19th century	The memorials are in the churchyard of St John the Baptist's Church, and are to the memory of members of the Prinsep family. They consist of three chest tombs in stone, and have moulded bases, slate caps with moulded edges, side and end panels with moulded surrounds, and corner pilasters, and two also have gadrooned bases.	II
Chetwynd Bridge; 52.72262°N 1.72324°W		1824	The bridge carries the A513 road over the River Tame, and was designed by Joseph Potter. The piers and abutments are in rusticated stone, and the arches are in cast iron. There are three segmental arches with latticework spandrels, and a balustrade. The abutments end in buttresses, and buttresses also flank the middle arch which carries an inscription.	II*
Group of eight memorials 52.72008°N 1.70941°W	—	Mid 19th century	The memorials are in the churchyard of St John the Baptist's Church. They consist of eight chest tombs in stone, and are all of similar design, each with a moulded base, reeded corner pilasters, and stepped caps with moulded edges.	II
Holy Trinity Church; 52.70631°N 1.68448°W		1880–81	The church, designed by Charles Lynam in Early English style, is built in red brick with stone dressings and has a tile roof. It consists of a nave, a chancel, and a northeast tower at the junction of the name and chancel. The tower has three stages, it incorporates a vestry, and has angle buttresses, a pointed doorway, lancet windows, a clock face on the north side, and a pyramidal roof. In the east wall of the vestry is a small round-headed window probably dating from the 11th century.	II
