= Dr Milley's Hospital =

Almshouse in Lichfield, Lichfield, England, UK

Dr Milley's Hospital is an almshouse for women in Lichfield, United Kingdom. It was founded on property (situated in the town ditch) given by Bishop Heyworth in 1424 for the use of the poor. The land was given, it is believed, on condition that a red rose was given to the Bishop of Lichfield (if demanded) each year on St John Baptist's Day, 24 June. It is not known when this custom ceased, but it was revived in 1987, and the Bishop is now invited that day to receive 10 red roses, one for each resident.

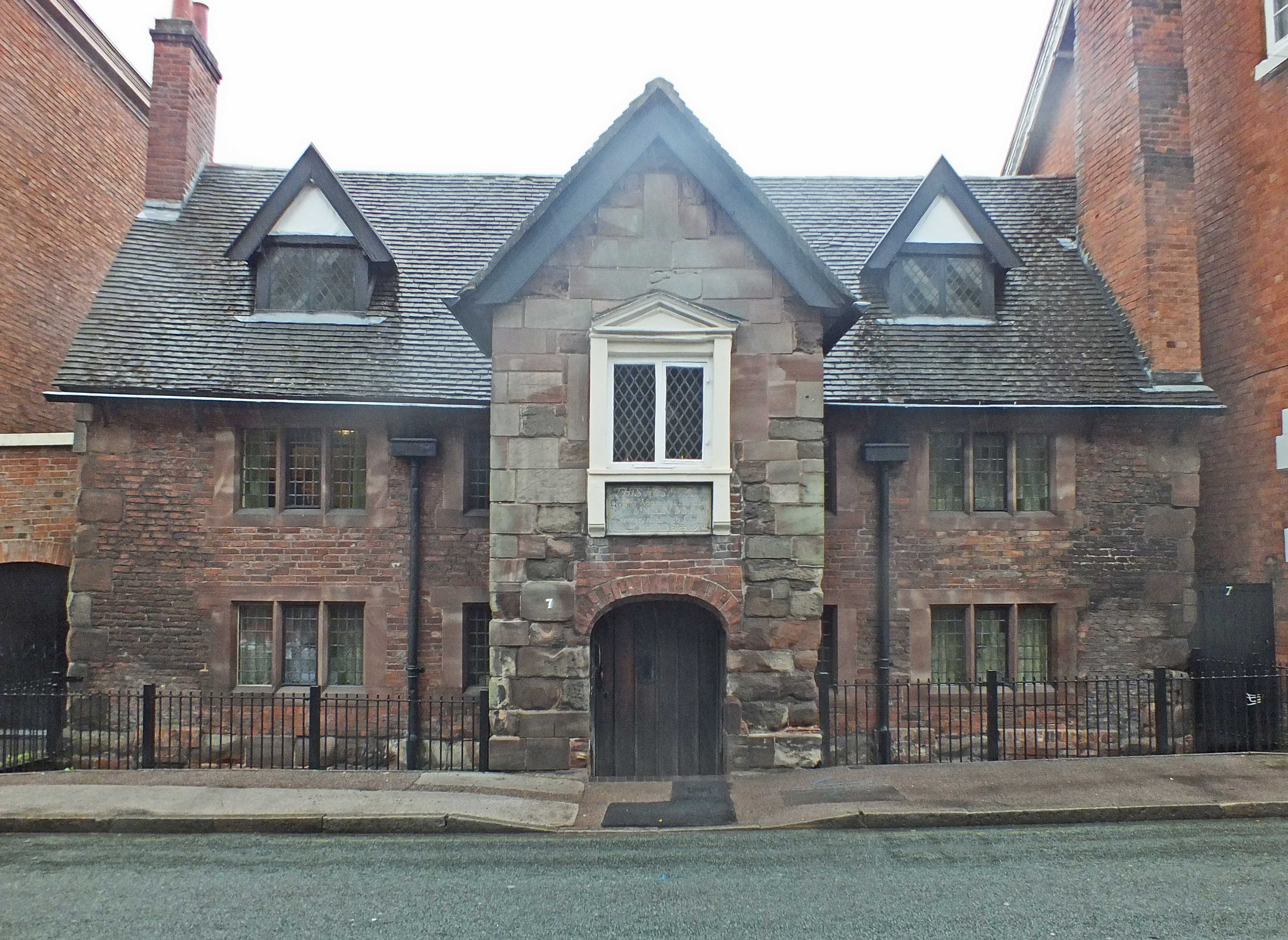
The front of Dr Milley's Hospital in Beacon Street, Lichfield.

The hospital is named after Thomas Milley, a Canon residentiary of Lichfield Cathedral, who re-endowed and probably rebuilt the Hospital between 1502 and 1504. At that time, it housed 15 poor women. Parts of the present building date back to 1652 (beams in upstairs corridor dated by dendrochronology), by which time the accommodation provided for only 10 residents.

In the early 1900s, the building was in such a bad state of repair that the Trustees wished to demolish all of it. The Charity Commissioners refused permission, and in 1906-7, part of the building was destroyed and the rest restored, leaving accommodation for 8 residents. Each woman had one room for all her needs, water had to be carried from the supply at the end of the passage, and when finished, it was returned and tipped down the sink. One bathroom and a communal laundry room were not provided until 1967.

It was extensively refurbished in the 1980s, and the Hospital now provides for 10 residents, 6 in self-contained flats and 4 in studio apartments. Each has its kitchen and bathroom. There is also a common room, laundry, drying area and garden. There is a Chaplain who holds regular services in the chapel. This is in the oldest part of the building, above the porch. It is possible that the large beam in the entrance hall below dates back to the 1504 building.

As an Almshouse Dr Milley's Hospital still operates as accommodation for women of all ages in need of accommodation.

It is run as a Charity by the Trustees.

The building was designated a Grade II* Listed building in 1952.

== See also ==
- Grade II* listed buildings in Lichfield (district)
- Listed buildings in Lichfield
