= Franciscan Friary, Lichfield =

Friary in Lichfield, Staffordshire, England

The Franciscan Friary
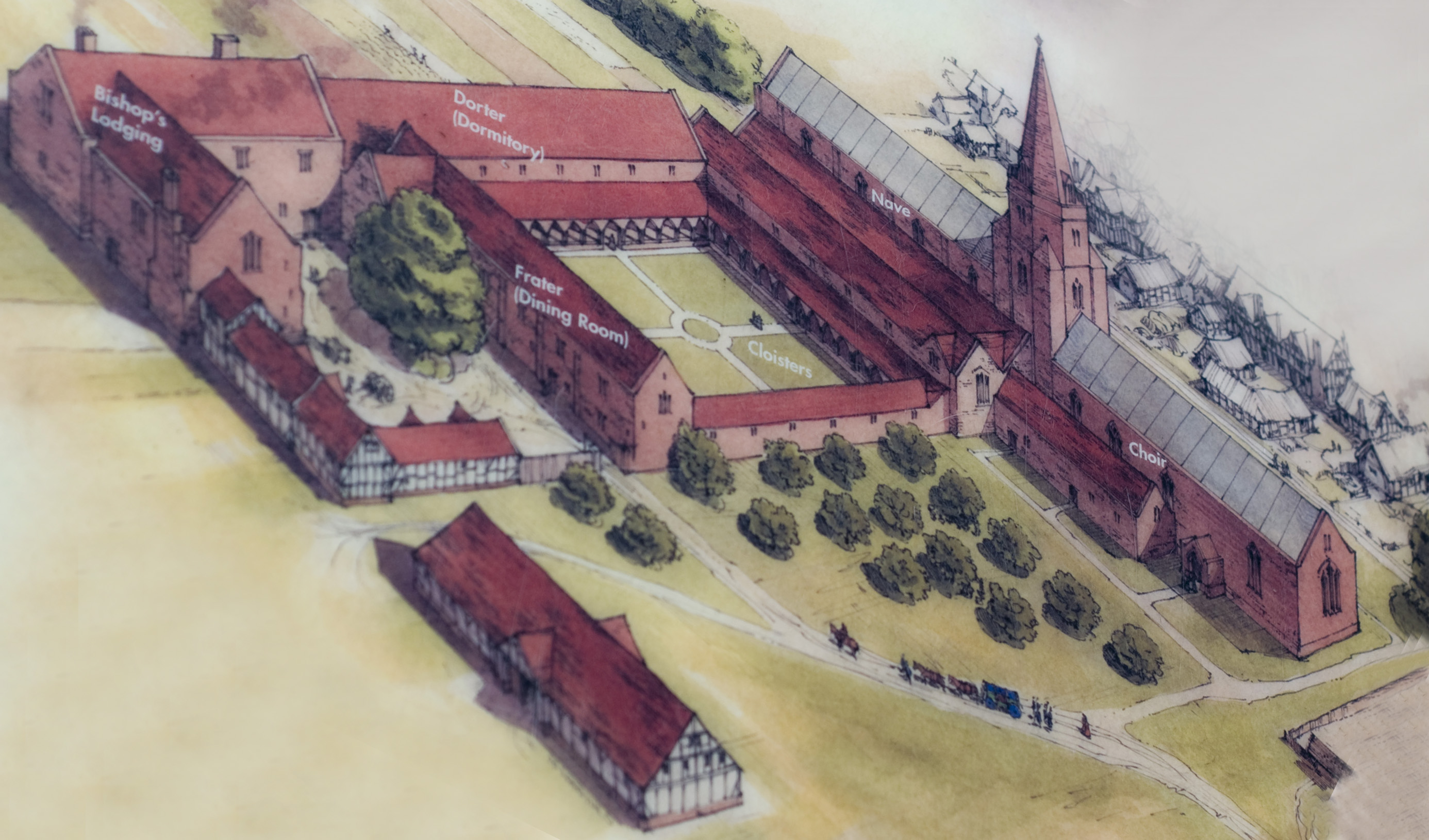
- Artist's impression of the Friary
- Interactive map of The Franciscan Friary

Monastery information
- Order: Franciscan Friars
- Established: 1237
- Disestablished: 1538

Architecture
- Heritage designation: Scheduled Ancient Monument

Site
- Location: Lichfield, Staffordshire
- Coordinates: 52.68191°N 1.83008°W
- Visible remains: floor slab of cloister and nave, Bishops Lodging
- Public access: Yes

The Franciscan Friary was once a large estate located on the west side of Lichfield city centre in Staffordshire. The estate was built and inhabited by the Franciscan Friars from 1237. At one time the estate consisted of a large church, a cloister, dormitory lodge and a refectory building as well as many other domestic dwellings.

Henry VIII ordered the dissolution of the Friary in 1538 and the majority of the buildings on the estate were demolished. Today the site of the Friary is a Scheduled Ancient Monument and the excavated ruins of some of the original buildings are visible in the specially designated site. The only original buildings still standing are present at the south west end of Lichfield Library.

== History ==
=== The Friary ===
The Franciscan Friars were an order of monks founded by St Francis of Assisi in 1209. In 1237 a group of these monks came to Lichfield to set up home. In the town they became known as the Grey Friars because of the colour of their habits. The Bishop of Lichfield at the time, Bishop Stavenby founded the Friary when he granted the friars ‘certain free burgages in the town for them to set their house on’.

The Friary was treated very generously during its time in Lichfield. They received gifts frequently in order to develop their estate. In 1237 King Henry III gave them oak trees from local forests for building and grants of money. In 1241 the Sheriff of Lichfield was authorised ‘to clothe the Friars of Lichfield’. In 1286 King Edward I provided them with 8 oak trees from Cannock Chase for further building. As the estate was developing a large fire broke out in Lichfield in 1291 destroying the Friary.

Again after the fire the Friars were treated generously by Lichfield and it was promptly rebuilt. In 1301 the Crucifix Conduit was built at the gates of the Friary at the corner of Bore Street and Bird Street. Henry Champanar, son of Michael de Lichfield, granted the Friars free water supply for their use from his springs at Aldershawe. The Crucifix Conduit remained in that position until the 19th century.

The Friars live a simple existence of poverty, chastity and obedience and spent most of their time preaching and caring for the poor and sick of Lichfield. This is why they were treated with such generosity over their time in Lichfield. It was with this that they received many gifts and amassed a fairly large wealth although they had not set out for this to be the case. With this wealth the simple timber structures of the Friary became large sandstone buildings within a site covering 12 acres. One of these buildings was the church which was large (the nave measured 110 ft x 60 ft, the chancel 95 ft x 28 ft and the cloister 80 ft square).

By 1534 Henry VIII had squandered most of his money. The wealth of the church became his target. In 1535, the Kings minister Thomas Cromwell ordered a valuation of all church property, following this with visitation to ascertain the rigour with which the monks were obeying the monastic rules. With this evidence, in 1536 he went to Parliament and secured an act that dissolved all monastic houses worth under £200 a year, all their properties to revert to the crown. In practise much of the property was sold to raise more income for the King. In 1538 the Franciscan Friary in Lichfield was dissolved after 301 years.

=== After Dissolution ===
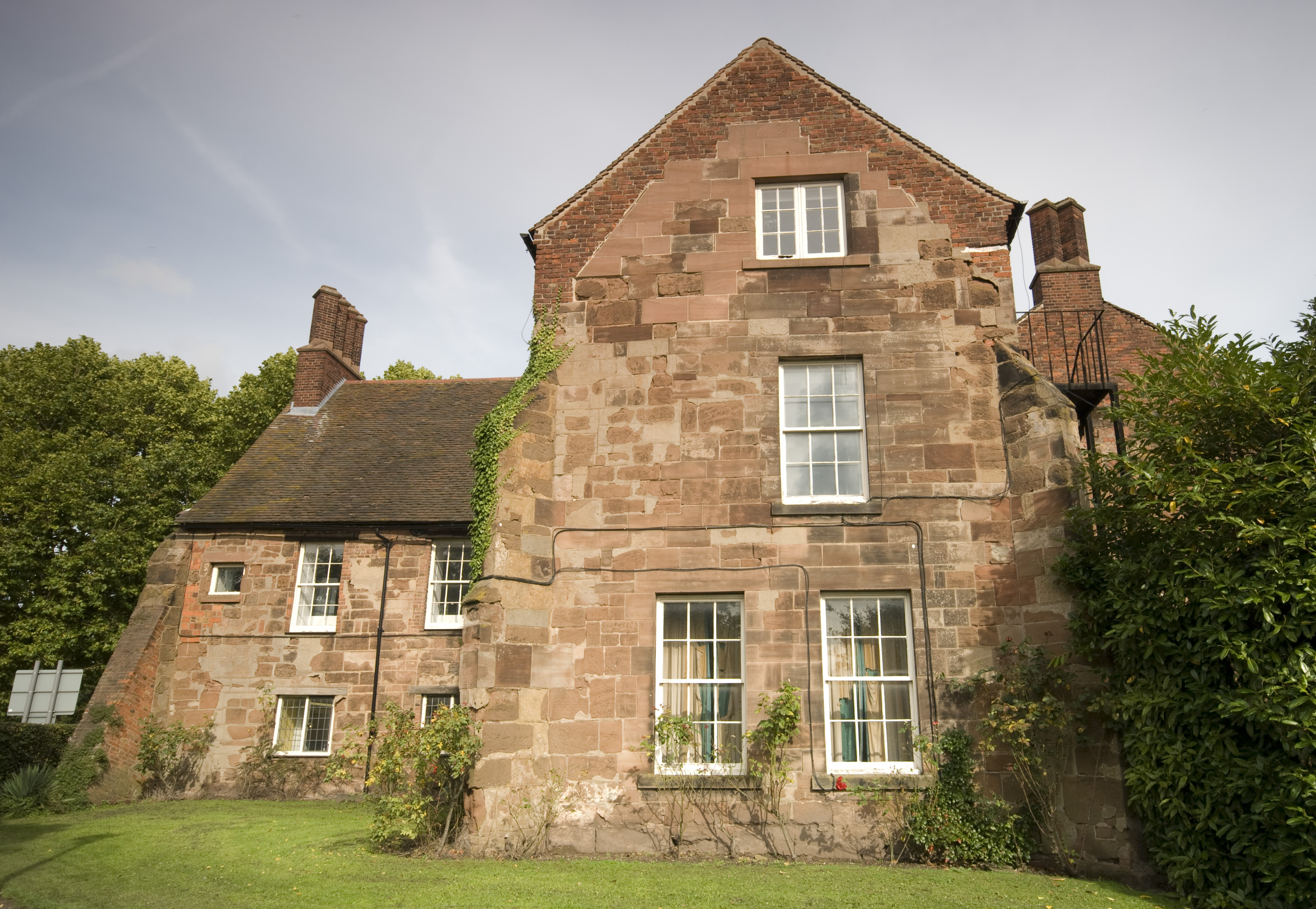
The original 16th century 'Bishops Lodging' buildings

After the dissolution the majority of the Friary site was cleared and sold for £68 to provide money for the crown. The church, cloisters, refectory and most domestic buildings were demolished. The only buildings to survive were the Dormitory on the west range and a house known as ‘Bishops Lodging’ in the south west corner.

These buildings formed an L shape in the corner of the large 10.5 acre estate of what was the Friary site. The remaining buildings were red sandstone buildings built in the early 16th century. These buildings would go on to serve as a domestic residence for many owners for approximately 370 years to come. The estate and remaining buildings were sold to Gregory Stonyng (the Master of St Mary's Guild) in 1544. He would remodel the buildings for his own domestic use. The estate and its buildings went on to be bought and sold to many different people until 1920.

In 1920 the 11-acre estate was sold to Sir Richard Ashmole Cooper (MP for Walsall), who gave it to the city for the purpose of developing the area and laying out a new road. For many years since the invention of the motor car Bird Street and Bore Street were becoming congested with traffic due to their narrow layout. The west side of Lichfield was still very much undeveloped by 1920 and the city didn't really extend beyond St Johns Street to the west.

In 1928 the current road named ‘The Friary’ was built across the former Friary site. The building of this road necessitated the relocation of the clock tower, the demolition of buildings on the south side of St John's Street and the demolition of much of the west range of the remaining buildings from the original Friary. Some of the remains from the demolition of the west range were used to build the public convenience located on the north east entrance to Beacon Park. The roads were declared open by Lady Cooper in April 1928.

The Bishops Lodging was the only remaining part of the original Friary to survive. When the new Friary Girls School was built in 1921 the Bishops Lodging were incorporated into the south west of the building. The Friary School relocated to the north of the city in 1975 and the building now serves as Lichfield Library. The remaining part of the original Friary can still be seen today in the south west part of the Library building.

In 1933 when the former church site of the Friary was threatened with development, Councillor Thomas Moseley secured permission to carry out an archaeological excavation. The dig revealed the extent and layout of the ruins. The site eventually became a Scheduled Ancient Monument thus preventing any danger of development on the site. The site is now a public garden and the slabs showing the layout of the walls of the cloister are visible on the ground as well as parts of the north wall of the nave. The classical style portico was set up in 1937 to frame the entrance to the excavated ruins. The portico came from Shenstone Court, which was home to Sir Richard Cooper.

The legacy of the Friary is still present in Lichfield today with many locations owing its name to the former Friary. These include the Friary School, Friary Tennis Club and the Friary Gardens among others.

== See also ==
- Franciscan
- Monastery
- Scheduled Monument
- List of Scheduled Ancient Monuments
