= Lichfield Clock Tower =

Coordinates: 52.679691°N 1.833418°W

- Friary Clock Tower
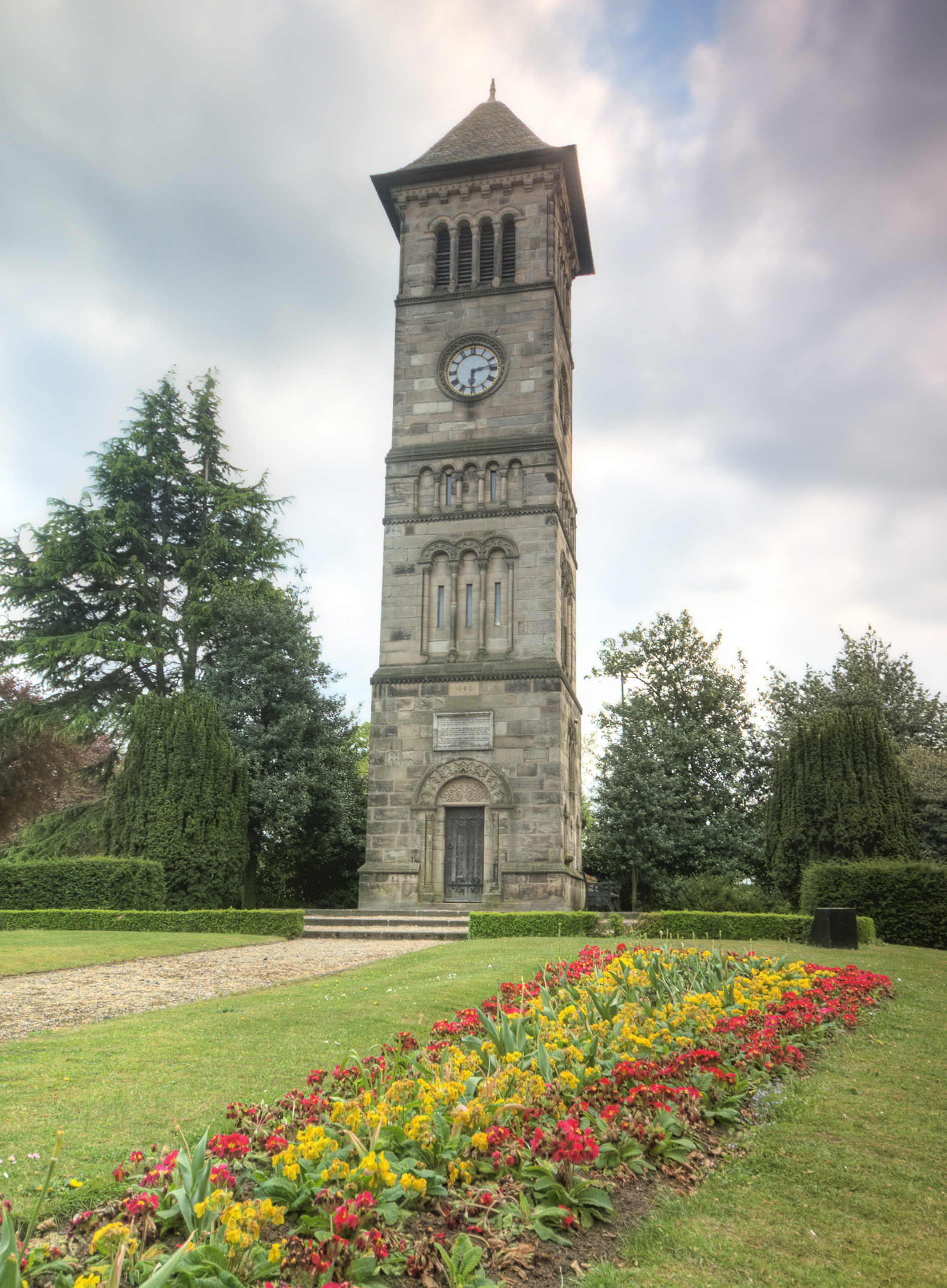
- Interactive map of the Lichfield Clock Tower area
- Former names: Crucifix Conduit Tower

General information
- Type: Clock tower
- Architectural style: Norman
- Location: Lichfield, England
- Completed: 1863
- Cost: £1,200
- Client: Lichfield Conduit Lands Trust
- Owner: Lichfield City Council

Design and construction
- Architect: Joseph Potter Jnr

Lichfield Clock Tower or Friary Clock Tower is a 19th-century Grade II listed clock tower located on "The Friary" south of Festival Gardens in the city of Lichfield, Staffordshire, England.

The tower was erected in 1863 at the junction of Bird Street and Bore Street over the site of the ancient Crucifix Conduit which supplied water to the Friary since 1301. In the early 20th century, since the invention of the motor car, Bird Street and Bore Street were becoming congested with traffic due to their narrow layout and the position of the clock tower only made matters worse. In 1928 the road named "The Friary" was built across the former Friary site. The building of this road necessitated the relocation of the clock tower, 400m west of its original location along the new road.

== History ==
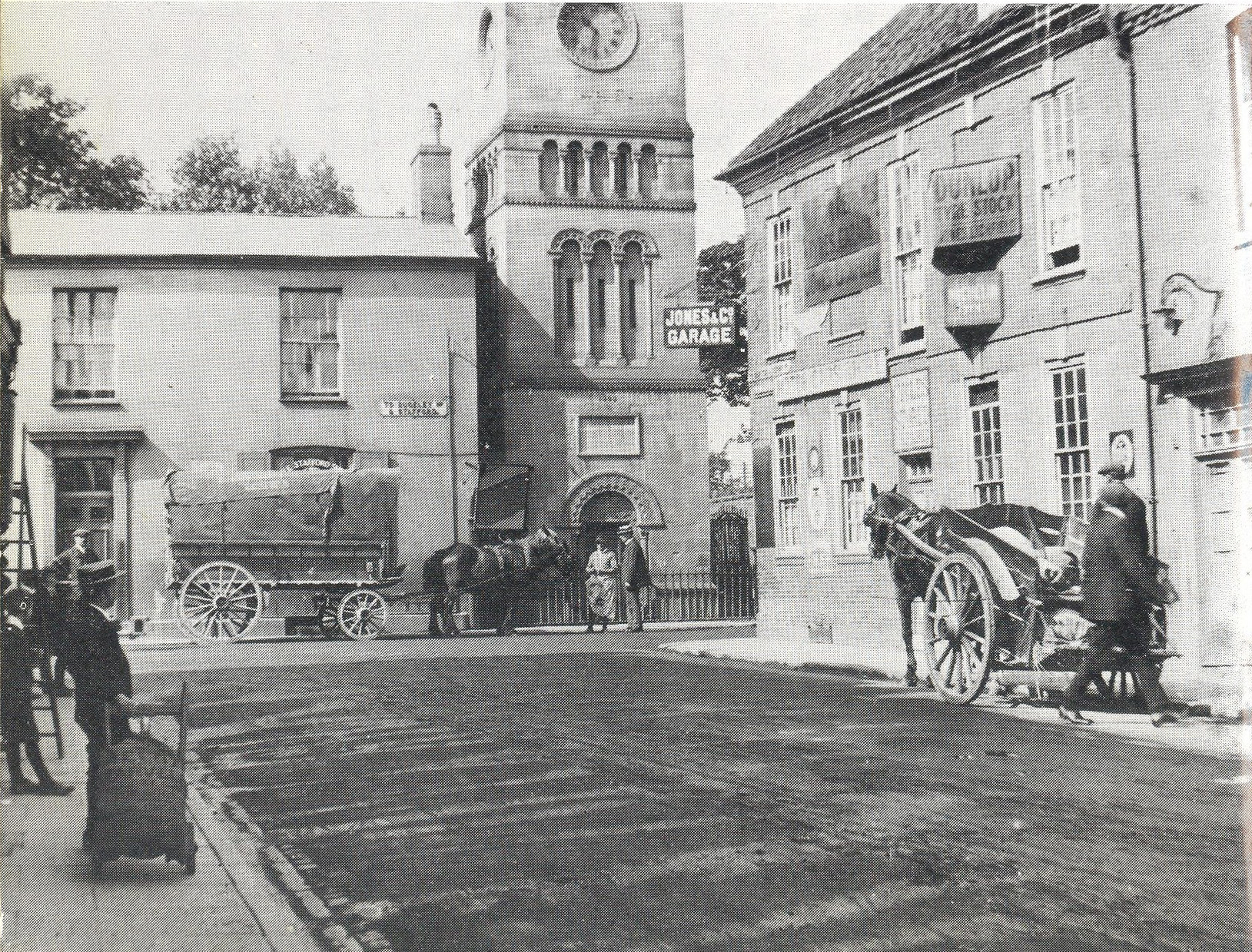
The tower in its original position

In the mid 19th century the building of clock towers was in fashion in England. Following the construction of Big Ben in 1858, the Council Chamber of Lichfield mooted the idea of following suit and building their own clock tower in the city.

A number of locations were suggested for the clock tower including the roof of the Guildhall and in the Market Square where it would incorporate the statue of Samuel Johnson into its structure. These ideas were eventually dismissed and it was decided to erect the tower at the junction of Bore Street and Bird Street capping the redundant Crucifix Conduit. The tower was designed by Joseph Potter Jnr. in a Norman style and financed by the Lichfield Conduit Lands Trust. When the tower was complete it had cost the Trust £1200. There were originally only three clock faces; a west face was considered unnecessary as it would only look upon one property, the Friary. However, due to complaints from the tenant at the Friary a fourth face was added. There were numerous problems regarding the accuracy of the clock during its early years until the whole mechanism was overhauled by Joyce of Whitchurch in 1898.

In 1920 the 11-acre Friary estate was sold to Sir Richard Ashmole Cooper (MP for Walsall), who gave it to the city for the purpose of developing the area and laying out a new road. For many years since the invention of the motor car Bird Street and Bore Street were becoming congested with traffic due to their narrow layout, and the position of the clock tower was part of the problem. The west side of Lichfield was still very much undeveloped by 1920 and the city did not really extend beyond St John's Street to the west.

In 1928 the road named "The Friary" was built across the former Friary site. The building of this road necessitated the relocation of the clock tower. The clock tower was taken down and re-erected at its current site south of Festival Gardens, some 400m west of its original location. The tower was repaired and restored in 1991 with the assistance of the Conduit Lands Trust. The clock tower is now in the care of Lichfield City Council.

== Gallery ==
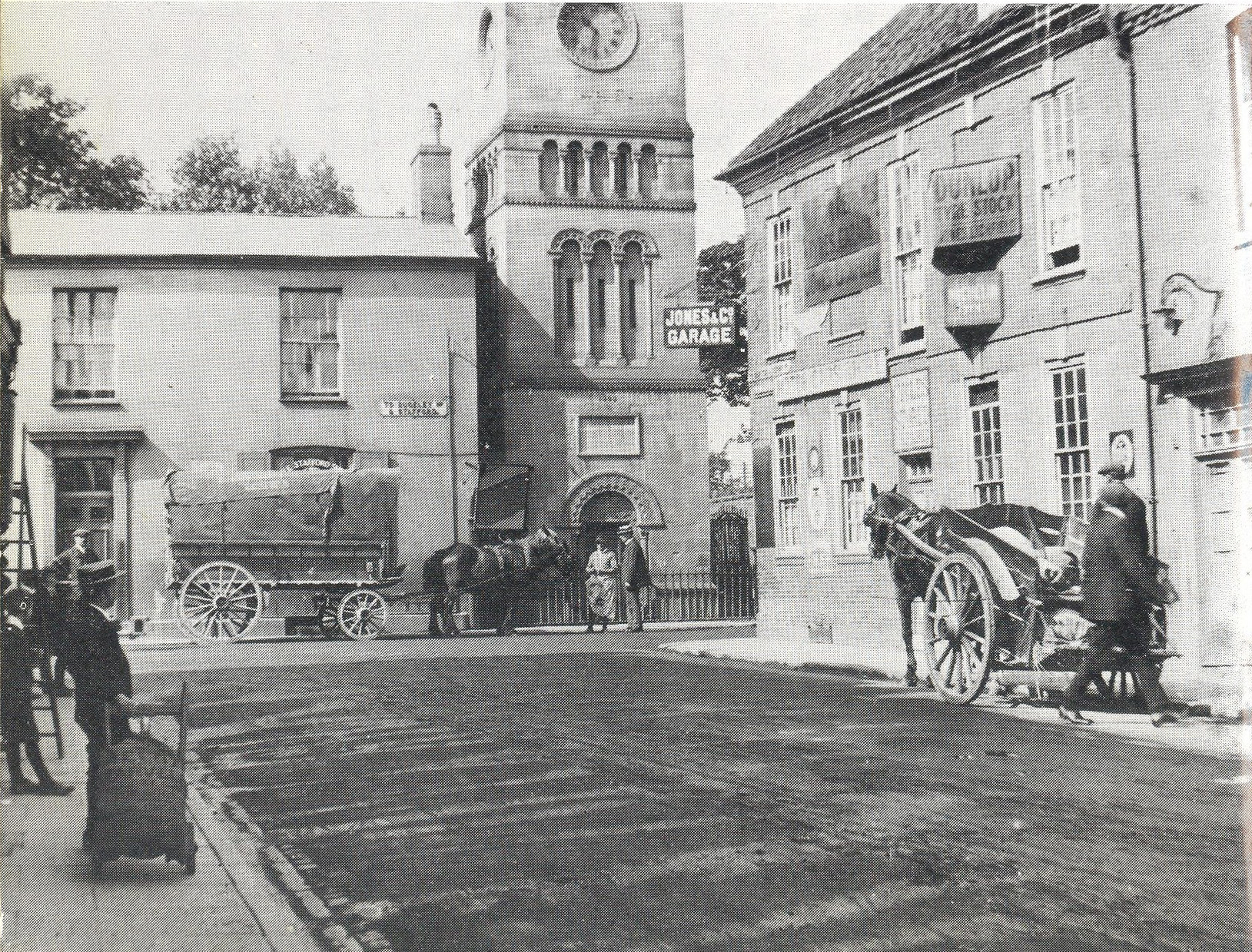
Bore Street c.1900

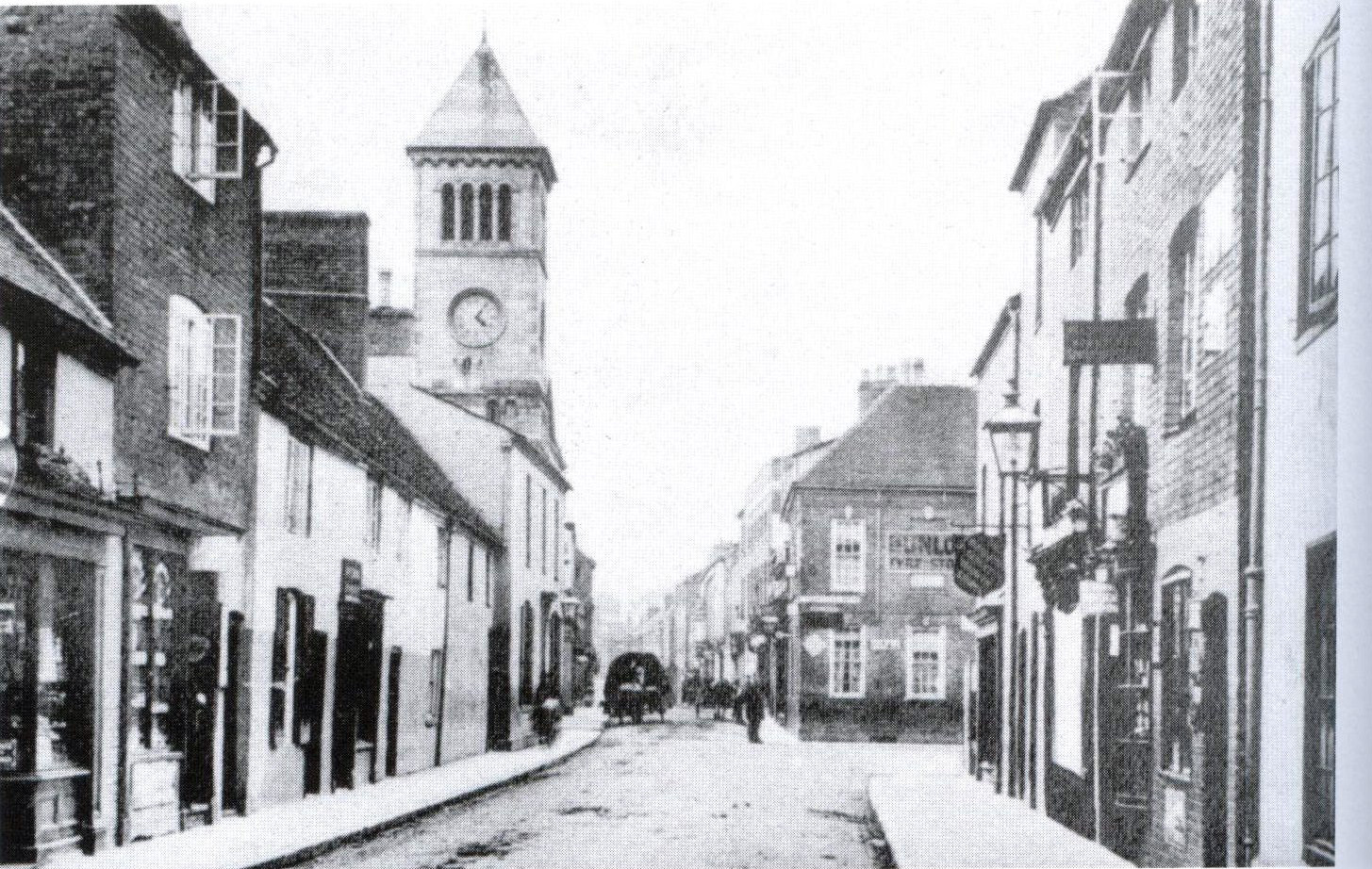
St John's Street c.1900

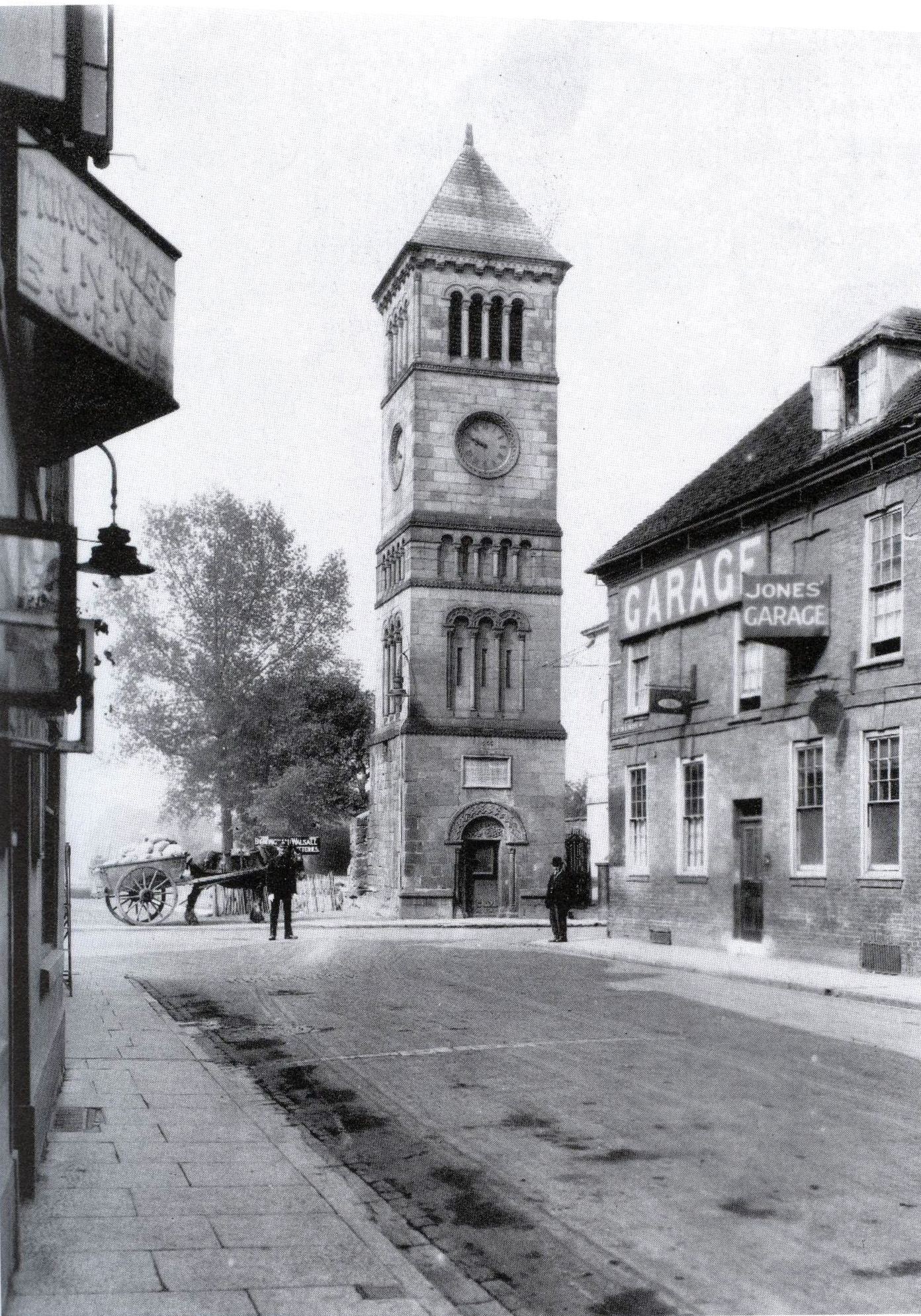
Bore Street c.1920s

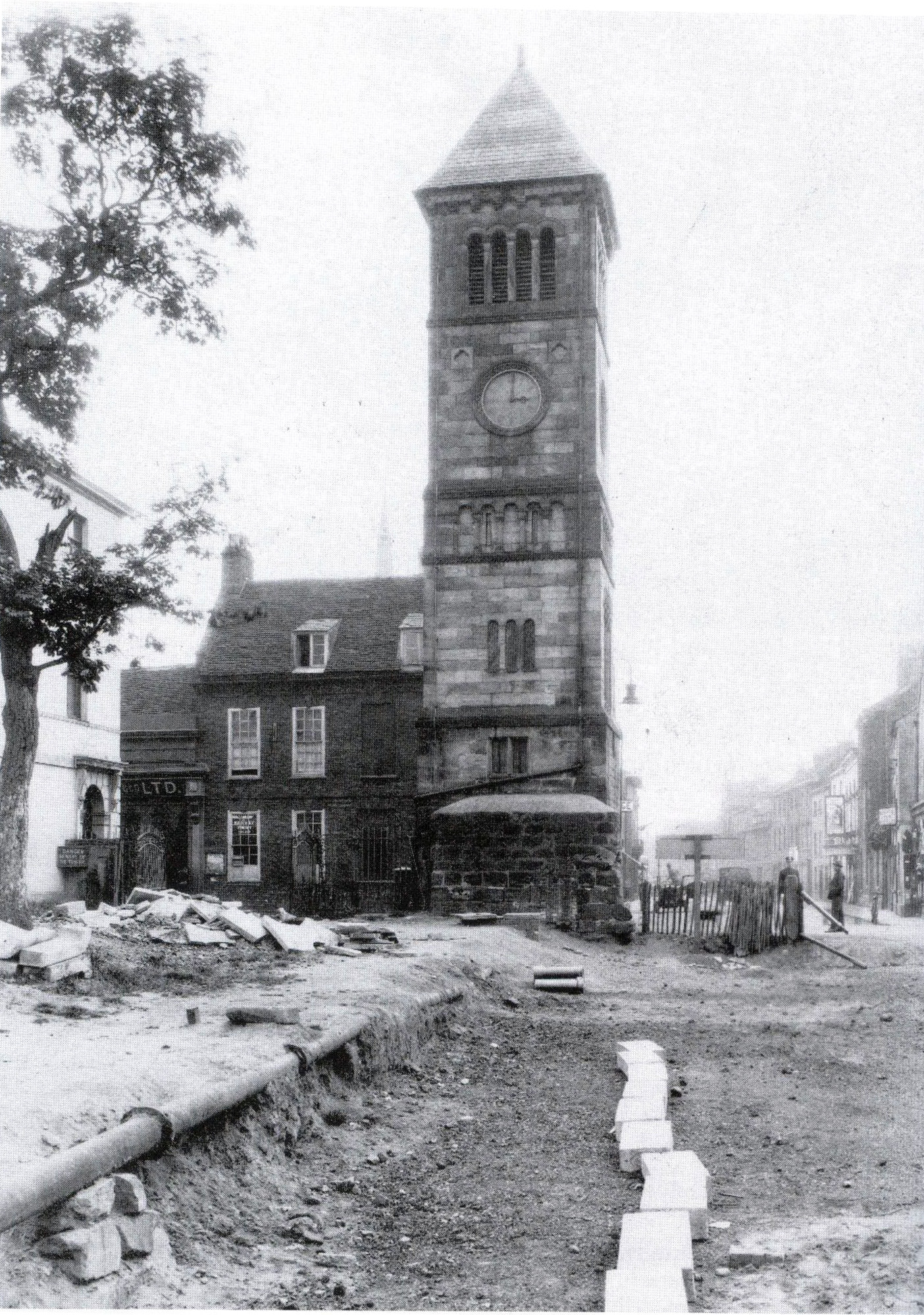
'The Friary' during construction 1928

== See also ==
- Listed buildings in Lichfield
