= High Bridge, Mavesyn Ridware =

High Bridge
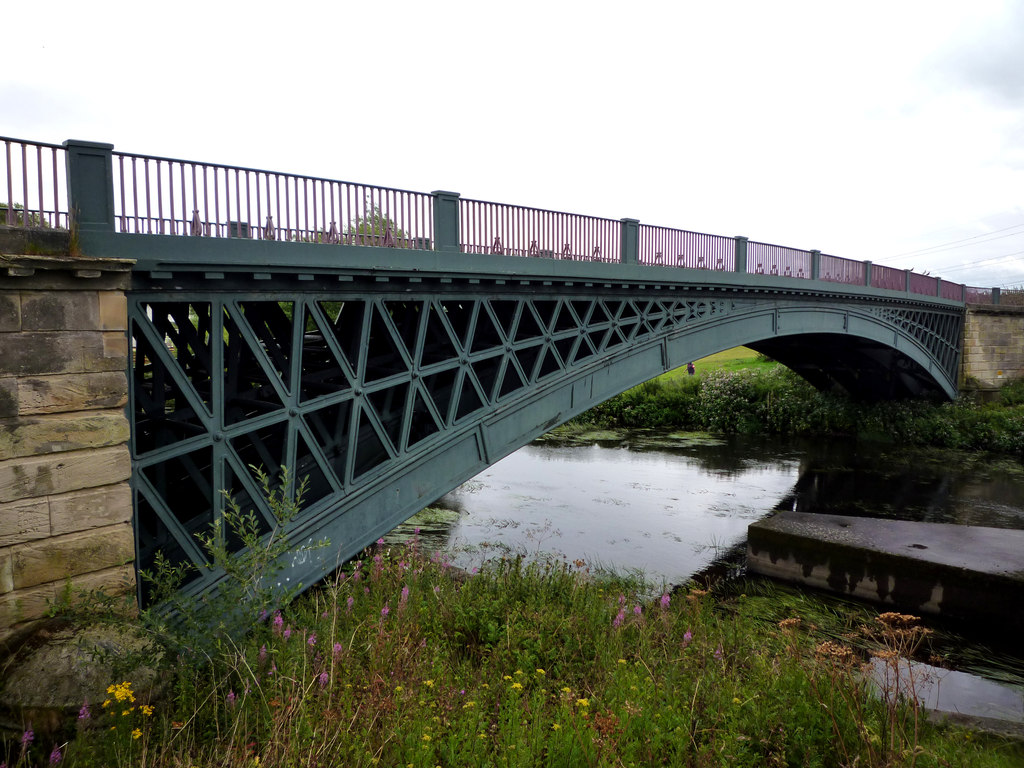
- The bridge in 2011
- Coordinates: 52°44′54″N 1°51′54″W
- Carries: Pedestrians and cyclists
- Crosses: River Trent
- Locale: Mavesyn Ridware, Staffordshire, England
- Maintained by: Staffordshire County Council
- Heritage status: Grade II* listed building

Characteristics
- Material: Cast iron
- No. of spans: 1

History
- Constructed by: Joseph Potter
- Opened: 1830

High Bridge spans the River Trent between Mavesyn Ridware and Handsacre (near Lichfield) in Staffordshire, England.

== Design ==
The bridge is a single cast-iron arch cast by the Coalbrookdale Company in Shropshire, famous for the Iron Bridge (the first substantial cast-iron bridge in the world). The same company had previously cast Potter's 1824 Chetwynd Bridge over the River Tame at nearby Alrewas.

The bridge has a span of 140 feet (43 metres). is 25 feet 8 inches (7.8 metres) wide, and rises to 14 feet (4.3 metres) above the river. The arch is made from five ribs, themselves made up of seven segments bolted together. Each rib is 3 feet (0.91 metres) deep and 2 inches (51 millimetres) thick. Circular tie rods provide lateral support and the spandrels (the space between the top of the arch and the bridge deck) decorative X-shaped cross-bracing. The abutments are of rusticated ashlar and . The original iron parapet is no longer in place and the current version is more modern. The abutments sweep forward and terminate as semi-octagonal piers. They have a dentilled cornice (a protruding ledge with decoration on the underside) and are topped with large stone caps. On each riverbank, behind the bridge, is a flight of steps.

== History ==
The bridge was completed in 1830. It was built by Joseph Potter, the county surveyor for Staffordshire, who had previously worked with Thomas Telford. It stood in largely its original condition until it was threatened by mining subsidence in 1982. The bridge was closed to traffic and the bridge was lightened by removing the road surface and parapets. Temporary concrete pillars were built in the river to support the bridge, then a steel arch was built underneath the cast iron to take its weight, after which the pillars were removed. A new bridge was built to the west to carry road traffic and High Bridge now carries pedestrians and cyclists only.

== See also ==
- Listed buildings in Mavesyn Ridware
- Grade II* listed buildings in Lichfield (district)
