= Chetwynd Bridge =

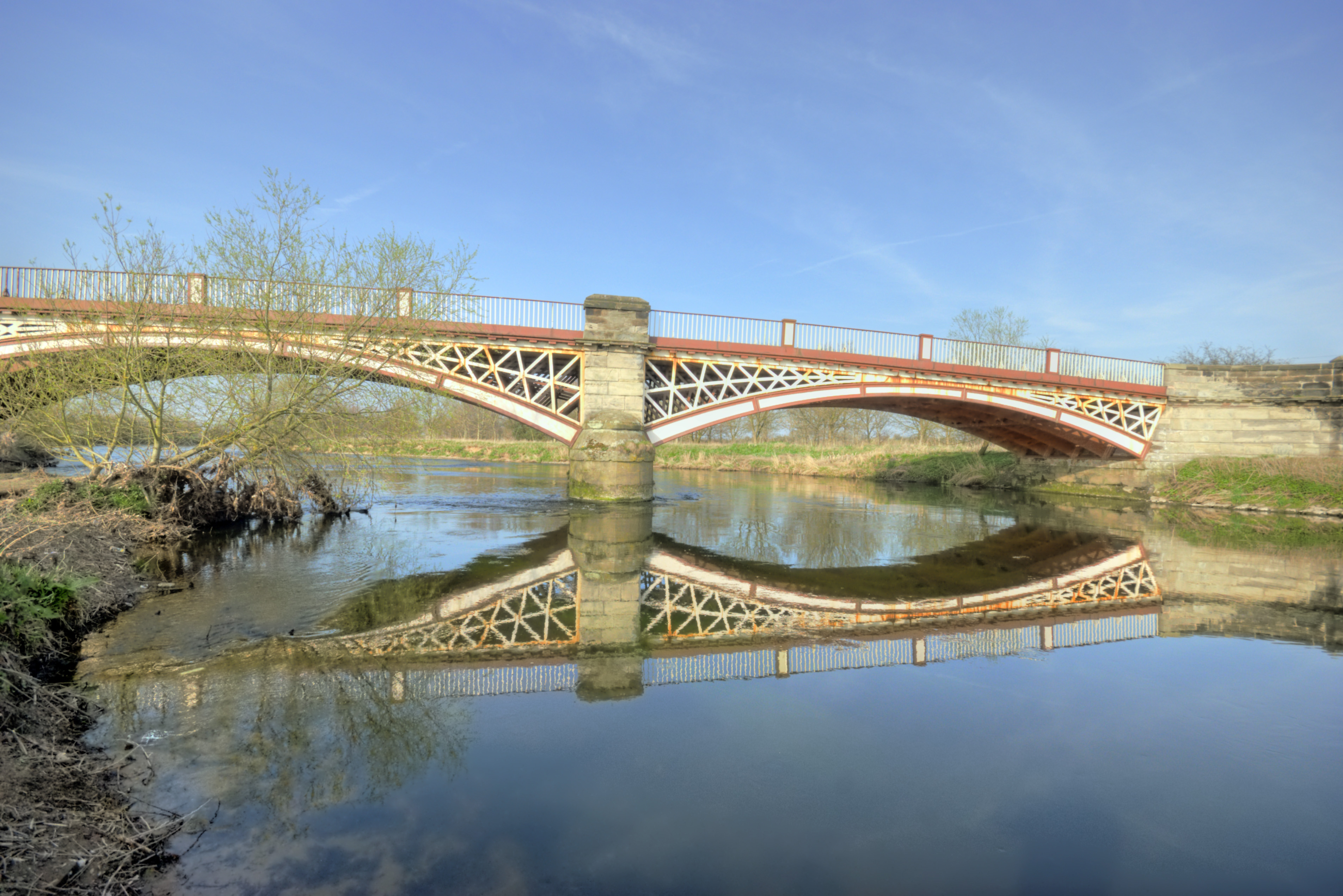
- Two arches of the bridge seen from the riverbank
- Coordinates: 52°43′21″N 1°43′23″W
- Carries: A513 road
- Crosses: River Tame
- Locale: Alrewas, Staffordshire, England
- Maintained by: Staffordshire County Council
- Heritage status: Grade II* listed building

Characteristics
- Material: Cast iron
- No. of spans: 3
- Piers in water: 1

History
- Constructed by: Joseph Potter
- Opened: 1824

Chetwynd Bridge (also known as Salter's Bridge) is a three-arch cast-iron bridge in Staffordshire, England. It carries the A513 road over the River Tame between Edingale and Alrewas in Staffordshire, England. It was completed in 1824 and is a Grade II* listed building.

== Design ==
The bridge was built in 1824. It has three segmental arches spanning the river, supported by rusticated ashlar pillars. The spandrels (the space between the arch and the bridge deck) have decorative X-shaped latticework. The abutments sweep round to form buttresses; the intermediate piers are in a similar style. The two outside spans are 65 feet (20 metres) wide and the central span is 75 feet (23 metres). The bridge is oriented roughly north–south and the northernmost span is over dry land.

The bridge was designed by Joseph Potter, a local architect and builder and the county surveyor for Staffordshire. Potter likely learnt to build with cast iron while working under Thomas Telford, including on the Harecastle Tunnel. The bridge was cast by the Coalbrookdale Company in Shropshire, famous for The Iron Bridge (the first substantial cast-iron bridge in the world). The same company cast High Bridge over the River Trent in nearby Mavesyn Ridware, also to Potter's design.

== History ==
The bridge is believed to be the largest surviving pre-1830 cast-iron bridge in England and the second-largest in the world.

The bridge is a Grade II* listed building, first listed in 1953, a status which provides legal protection from demolition or unauthorised modification. A condition survey in 1979 revealed significant corrosion and fracturing of the metalwork; repairs were completed in 1983. After a deterioration in the condition of the ironwork was noticed, the bridge was added to the Heritage at Risk Register in 2022. Amey and Staffordshire County Council (the owner of the bridge) carried out restoration work over a period of eight months, beginning in June 2022, which won several awards from the Chartered Institution of Highways and Transportation. As a result, the bridge was removed from the at-risk register. A weight limit of 18 tonnes (18,000 kg) was imposed to prevent further deterioration, which was later reduced to 7.5 tonnes (7,500 kg). In 2023, barriers were installed to prevent large vehicles from using the bridge after concerns that many heavy vehicles were ignoring signs warning of the restriction. As of 2023, the council planned to build a new bridge and bypass road to divert vehicle traffic and reserve Chetwynd Bridge for pedestrians and cyclists.

== See also ==
- Grade II* listed buildings in Lichfield (district)
- Listed buildings in Edingale
