= Croxall Hall =

Location in UK

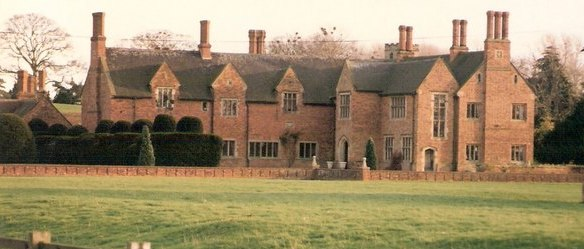
- Croxall Hall

- Location within Staffordshire
- Former names: Croxall Manor

General information
- Location: Croxall, Staffordshire, England, United Kingdom
- Coordinates: 52°43′15″N 1°42′38″W
- Completed: Late 16th Century
- Client: Croxall Family

Croxall Hall is a restored and extended 16th century manor house situated in the small village of Croxall, Staffordshire (close to the southeastern border with Derbyshire and historically part of it). It is a Grade II* listed building.

The manor of Croxall was owned by the Curzon Family, who rebuilt the old manor house in the late 16th century.

== Owners ==
=== The Curzon Family ===
Croxall, then in Derbyshire, was one of 140 Derbyshire Manors granted to Henry de Ferrers following the Norman Conquest of 1066.

Croxall, together with the Manors of Edingale, Twyford and Kedleston were granted to Richard De Curzon; Richard was son of Giraline De Courson, a Breton who had fought in the conquest. The family were originally linked with the town of Notre-Dame-de-Courson in France.

The family held the manors under the Ferrers Family until 1266 when, after the 6th Earl's rebellion against the King, the Ferrers' lands came under the Duchy of Lancaster. The family held the Manors under the Duchy until the end of the 14th century, after which time they held them direct from the crown.

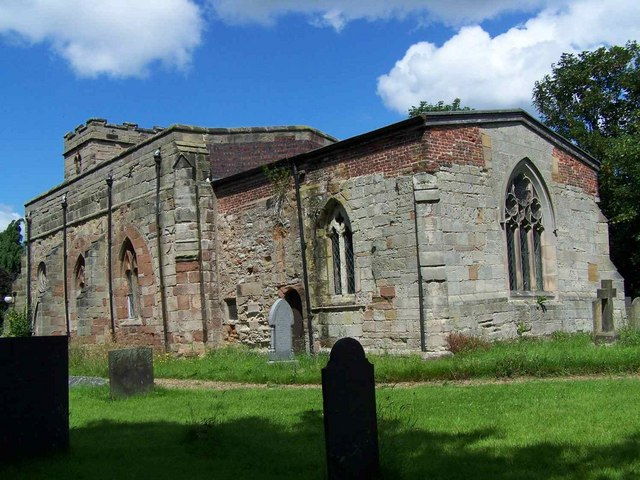
St. John the Baptist Church, Croxall; adjacent to Croxall Hall

Richard De Curzon had a son Robert, whom himself had 3 sons: Richard, Thomas and Robert. Richard was left Croxall, Edingale and Twyford, and is from whom the Curzons of Croxall are descended; Thomas was left Kedleston, and is from whom the Curzons of Kedleston are descended. The third son, known as Robert of Courçon, became a celebrated Cardinal, and was a school colleague and friend of Pope Innocent III.

The division of property caused dispute. Thomas had been left Kedleston by his father, but his grandmother, Alice (formerly De Somerville), claimed she had been left the Manor by her husband. The depute was solved by giving Croxall Manor to Alice for the duration of her life, after which time it passed back to Richard.

The Manor of Twyford was conveyed to John Creweker in 1421, leaving the Curzons with the two adjoining manors of Croxall and Edingale. It's not known when the Curzon family took up residence at Croxall; There has been a house on the site since before they took ownership; however, the earliest known Curzon graves within the parish church date from the 14th century.

The Manor was the childhood home of Joyce Curzon (later known as Lady De Appleby, and then as Mrs. Joyce Lewis), a Protestant Martyr who, in 1557, was burned at the stake in the Market Place in Lichfield. This was part of the Marian persecutions of Queen Mary (Bloody Mary).

=== Later owners ===
The property passed to the Sackville family, the Earls, and later Dukes, of Dorset, following the death of the last male Curzon, Sir George Curzon, in 1622. Sir George's daughter and heiress, Mary Curzon, brought the property by marriage to Edward Sackville, 4th Earl of Dorset.

A tradition reported in Magna Britannia by Daniel and Samuel Lysons states that author John Dryden visited Charles Sackville, 6th Earl of Dorset at Croxall Hall, and the land once known as Dryden's Walk was said to be named for the poet. The Sackvilles spent less and less time at Croxall and by the mid-18th century, there is evidence they were renting the Hall to local farmers.

In about 1779 the manor was sold by John Sackville, 3rd Duke of Dorset, to John Prinsep a wealthy East India merchant and later Member of Parliament. The method of this sale is unclear, with some evidence suggesting Prinsep acquired the Hall as the result of a bet or wager. His son Thomas Prinsep (High Sheriff of Derbyshire in 1802), left the 1,450-acre (600 ha) estate to his nephew Thomas Levett of Wychnor Hall who thereupon changed his name to Thomas Levett-Prinsep.

By 1920, the Levett-Prinsep family had fallen on hard times; they were forced to sell the Croxall Estate and later moved to Devon. The estate was subsequently split up.

In 1930 the Hall and 100 acres of land were purchased by Captain Charlton and his wife Edith who used it as a farm. On 7 November 1942, their son, Major Nicholas Charlton, and his wife, Ethel, were killed when a fire broke out at the Hall. Edith Charlton escaped by climbing from a window, down the ivy that covered the building. The fire resulted in the demolition of the west wing of the Hall.

In 1953 the Hall was sold to a local businessman, Jim Rose of Tamworth; he and his family gradually restored what remained of the hall.

== History ==
=== Architectural history ===
There has been a house on the site since "very early times"; at least since the Norman Conquest. Little is known of the pre-Tudor manor houses, but there was a moat. The present brick-built house dates from Elizabethan times, and was built in the traditional Tudor E shape.

The Dorset (Sackville) Family had ceased residing at the Hall by the 19th century and it began to fall into disrepair; it was subsequently sold to the Levett-Prinsep Family but decline continued, and 1868 it was being used as a farm house. It was damaged by fire in 1868, and then over the following four years the Hall was restored and extended for the Levett-Prinsep family, by the architect Joseph Potter of Lichfield.

The Birmingham and Derby Junction Railway passes within a mile. There was a time when the Hall was served by Croxall railway station, which closed in 1928.

In 1942 the house was again damaged by fire. It killed the owner's son and daughter-in-law, and destroyed the west wing, including the Library and Long Gallery. Given the conditions of World War II, restoration was not possible, and the wing was demolished.

After sale to the Rose family in 1953, what remained of the house was gradually restored.

=== Famous visitors ===
Mary Queen of Scots is supposed to have stayed at the Hall for one night during her time imprisoned in various Derbyshire houses. Queen Henrietta Maria, wife of King Charles I, stayed at the Hall in one of the bedrooms in the west wing.

== See also ==
- Grade II* listed buildings in Lichfield (district)
- Listed buildings in Edingale
