= St John the Baptist's Church, Croxall =

St John the Baptist’s Church, Croxall
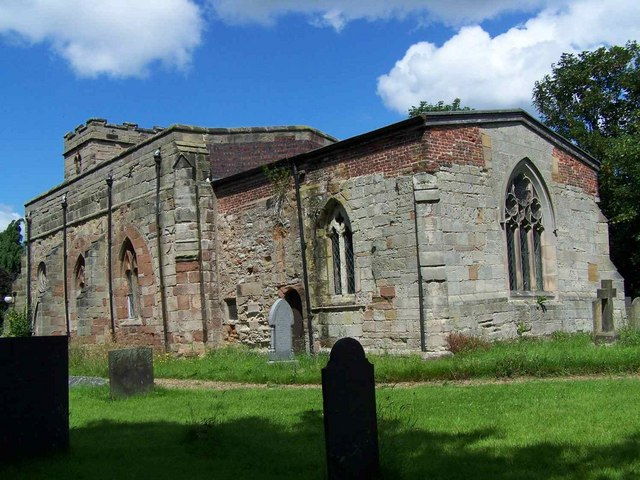
- St John the Baptist’s Church, Croxall
- St John the Baptist’s Church, Croxall
- 52°43′13.62″N 1°42′31.21″W
- OS grid reference: SK 19759 13634
- Location: Croxall, Staffordshire
- Country: England
- Denomination: Church of England

History
- Dedication: St John the Baptist

Architecture
- Heritage designation: Grade II* listed

Administration
- Diocese: Diocese of Derby
- Archdeaconry: Derby
- Deanery: Repton
- Parish: Croxall

St John the Baptist's Church, Croxall is a Grade II* listed parish church in the Church of England in Croxall.

== History ==
The earliest parts of the church are the chancel of c.1200. The church is noted for its fine collection of memorials.

== Memorials ==
- George Curzon (d. 1605)
- Mary Curzon (d. 1612)
- Henrie Curzon (d. 1639)
- Christopher Horton (d. 1714)
- Waltar Horton (d. 1716)
- Christopher Horton (d. 1659)
- Christopher Horton (d.1701)
- Eusebius Horton (d. 1823) and Phoebe Horton (d. 1814) by Sir Francis Leggatt Chantrey
- Harriet Louise Wilmot Horton (d. 1831)
- Sir Robert Wilmot-Horton, 3rd Baronet (d. 1841) by Denman
- Margaret Prinsep (d. 1843), Caroline Mary Prinsep (d. 1842), Frances Levett (d. 1835) by Reeves of Bath
- Revd. Samuel Holworthy (d. 1838)

== See also ==
- Grade II* listed buildings in Lichfield (district)
- Listed buildings in Edingale
