= Croxall (surname) =

Croxall is a surname. Notable people with the surname include:

- John Croxall (born 1946), British biologist.
- Kyle Croxall (born 1988), Canadian ice hockey player and skater.
- Martine Croxall (born 1969), British journalist and television news presenter.
- Samuel Croxall (1690–1752), Anglican churchman, writer and translator.
- Thomas Henry Croxall (fl. 1948–1967), English minister and translator.

== See also ==
- Croxall, Staffordshire, United Kingdom
