= Lichfield War Memorial =

War memorial in Staffordshire, England

Coordinates: 52°41′04″N 1°49′53″W

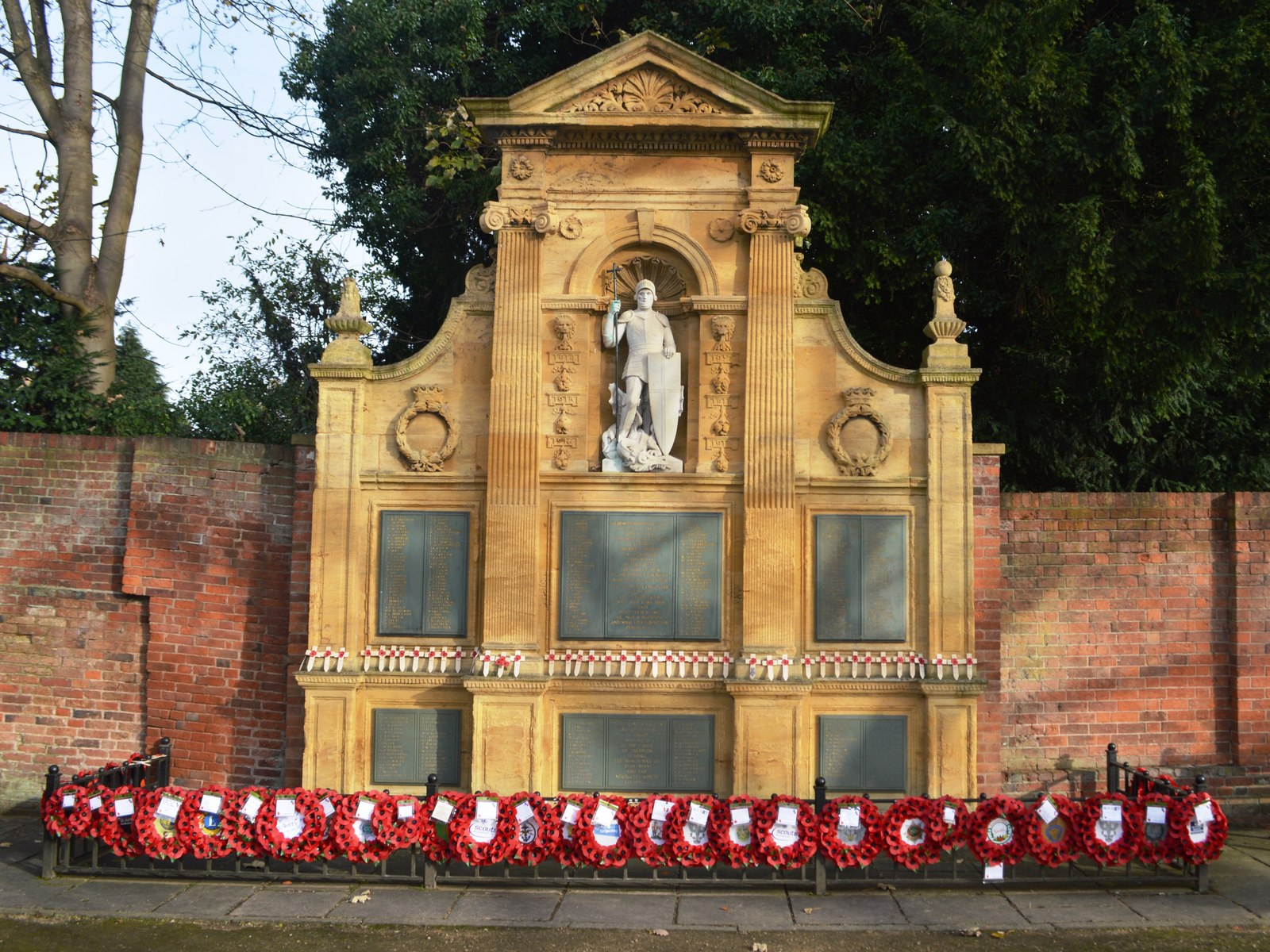
The memorial in 2017

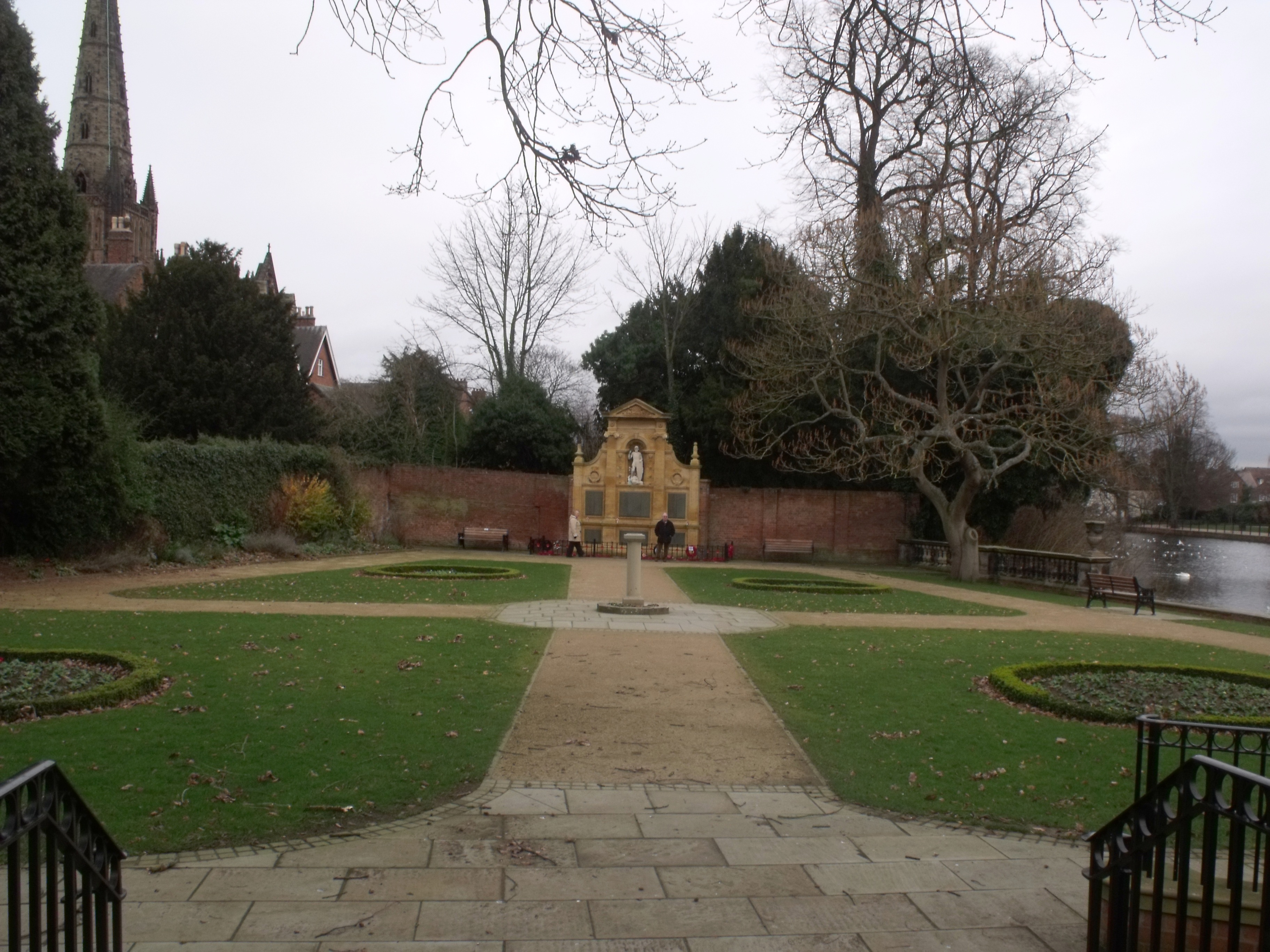
In wider context in the Garden of Remembrance in 2012. Minster Pool at right and Lichfield Cathedral in background

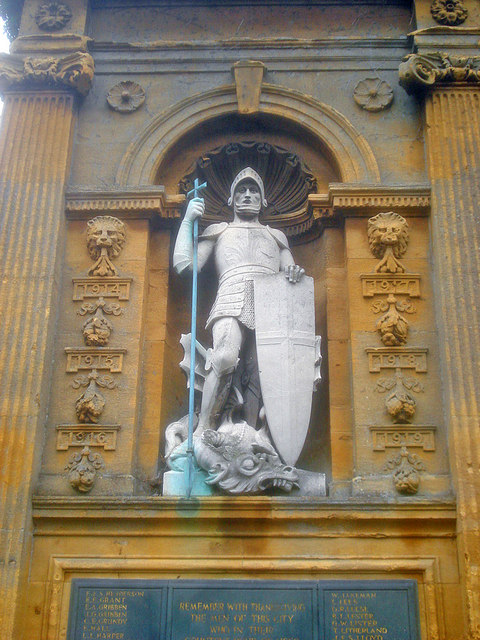
Detail of St George and the slain dragon in 2009

The Lichfield War Memorial, also known as the Men of Lichfield Memorial, is a grade II* listed building in Lichfield, Staffordshire, in England. The memorial sits within the Garden of Remembrance located near to the city's cathedral and Minster Pool. The site was designed by Charles Bateman and was constructed between 1919 and 1920 to commemorate people from the city who were killed fighting in the First World War. The memorial is formed of limestone; it is slab-like and rendered in the English Renaissance style with some classical features. The central feature is a life-size sculpture of Saint George standing atop the vanquished dragon. Slate plaques list the names of the dead; additional plaques were added later to commemorate the dead of the Second World War.

== Description ==
The Lichfield War Memorial lies within the Garden of Remembrance, to the north-west of Minster Pool and south-west of Lichfield Cathedral. The site has high brick walls to the north and east edges, a balustrade with gate onto Bird Street to the west and more balustrade on the boundary with Minster Pool to the south. There are two pairs of decorative urns atop the balustrade on the south and west boundaries. The wrought-iron gate bears the lettering "PAX–1919" referring to the 1919 Treaty of Versailles which ended the First World War (though fighting ended with the armistice of 11 November 1918). The gate piers are brick with stone caps that support sculptures of lions bearing the coat of arms of the city.

The war memorial abuts the eastern wall of the gardens and is slab-like, measuring 7.25 metres (23.8 ft) in height, 9.25 metres (30.3 ft) in width and is 0.8 metres (2 ft 7 in) in depth. The memorial is English Renaissance in style and resembles a classical basilica façade and is rendered in limestone from Guiting Power, Gloucestershire. Two panelled piers at either end of the memorial are topped with balls and foliage. From the piers swept parapets lead up to the central bay of the memorial, which is its highest. The faces of the parapets contain relief carvings of wreaths surmounted by crowns and the parapet is topped with a scroll details.

Two classical style, Ionic reeded and fluted pilasters frame the centre of the memorial. Within this frame is a niche containing a life-sized Portland stone sculpture of Saint George. George stands atop the slain dragon, he holds a bronze Christian cross in his right hand and his left hand rests on a shield with the same symbol. The pose is similar to that of Renaissance-era sculptor Giulio Angolo del Moro's statue of the saint on the façade of the San Giorgio Maggiore church in Venice. George is depicted as proud and youthful, his armour is inspired by that depicted in Donatello's sculpture of St George at the Orsanmichele church in Florence. The niche has a semi-circular top with a shell detail. Between the niche and the pilasters on each side a relief of a lion's head stands at the head of the years (1914–1919), denoting the years of the First World War, interposed with inverted bouquets, also in relief. The central bay is topped by a tympanum decorated with carvings of a scallop shell and leaves.

The names of the war dead are inscribed on two sets of three Westmoreland slate panels, one set for each of the world wars, below Saint George and the carvings. The 209 names of the First World War dead are on panels 1.2 metres (3 ft 11 in) in height, the outer two panels are 1 metre (3 ft 3 in) wide while the central panel is 1.3 metres (4 ft 3 in) wide. The 83 names of the Second World War dead are on similar panels of the same width but shorter in height, on the plinth below the other panels. The centre of each central panel contains an inscription commemorating the sacrifice of those named.

REMEMBER WITH THANKSGIVING / THE MEN OF THIS CITY / WHO IN THEIR / COUNTRY'S HOUR OF NEED / WENT FORTH / ENDURED HARDNESS / FACED DANGER / AND FINALLY /PASSED OUT OF / THE SIGHT OF MEN / BY THE PATH OF SACRIFICE / AND THE GATE OF DEATH. / LET ALL WHO COME AFTER / SEE TO IT / THAT THESE DEAD / SHALL NOT HAVE DIED / IN VAIN / THAT THEIR NAME / BE NOT FORGOTTEN / AND WHAT THEY STROVE FOR / PERISH NOT.

— Inscription on the central First World War plaque

THESE LOWER PANELS / ARE DEDICATED / TO THOSE / WHO DIED / IN THE CAUSE / OF FREEDOM / DURING / THE WORLD WAR / 1939–1945 / AND THE / STRUGGLES WHICH / FOLLOWED.

— Inscription on the central Second World War plaque

== History ==
In the years prior to the First World War the city of Lichfield housed the depot for the four reserve battalions of the South Staffordshire Regiment and the North Staffordshire Regiment. During the course of the war each regiment raised a further three New Army battalions in the city; these went on to serve in France and Italy. The South Staffordshire Regiment also raised a garrison battalion in the city for service in India. After the war, a War Memorial Committee chaired by Major Longstaff was established in Lichfield to commemorate the city's men who had lost their lives in the war.

The architect Charles Bateman was appointed to design the works, which utilised a site already owned by the Lichfield Corporation, and works began in 1919 under the supervision of the Lichfield City Surveyor P. A. Benn. The site was laid out as a garden within the existing 18th-century walls. According to Historic England the balustrade and urns were relocated here from Shenstone Court in Staffordshire but George T. Noszlopy and Fiona Waterhouse, writing in 2005, state they came from Moxhull Hall in Warwickshire. The right-hand gate pier incorporates an ancient boundary stone. The gates were manufacturer by J. C. Culwick of Lichfield.

Bateman designed the war memorial and Messrs Robert Bridgeman and Sons of Lichfield built it. The garden and memorial were opened on 20 October 1920 by the mayor, H. G. Hall, and dedicated the same day by the Bishop of Lichfield John Kempthorne. The ceremony was attended by a large number of dignitaries, the buglers of the 6th Battalion of the North Staffordshire Regiment, the band of the 2nd Battalion of the Oxfordshire and Buckinghamshire Light Infantry and choirs from the cathedral and local churches.

The additional plaques for the Second World War dead were added shortly after that war's conclusion in 1945. The memorial first received statutory protection as a grade II listed building on 5 February 1952. This listing includes the walls, gate piers and balustrade but the memorial is noted as the primary object of interest. The gardens and memorial were restored between 2009 and 2012 in a £60,000 project part funded by the Heritage Lottery Fund and the War Memorials Trust. The restoration work received a British Association of Landscape Industries award in 2012. The memorial and gardens protection was raised to grade II* on 24 June 2016 as part of commemorations for the centenary of the start of the Battle of the Somme.

== See also ==
- Grade II* listed buildings in Staffordshire
- Grade II* listed war memorials in England
- Listed buildings in Lichfield
