= Croxall Lakes =

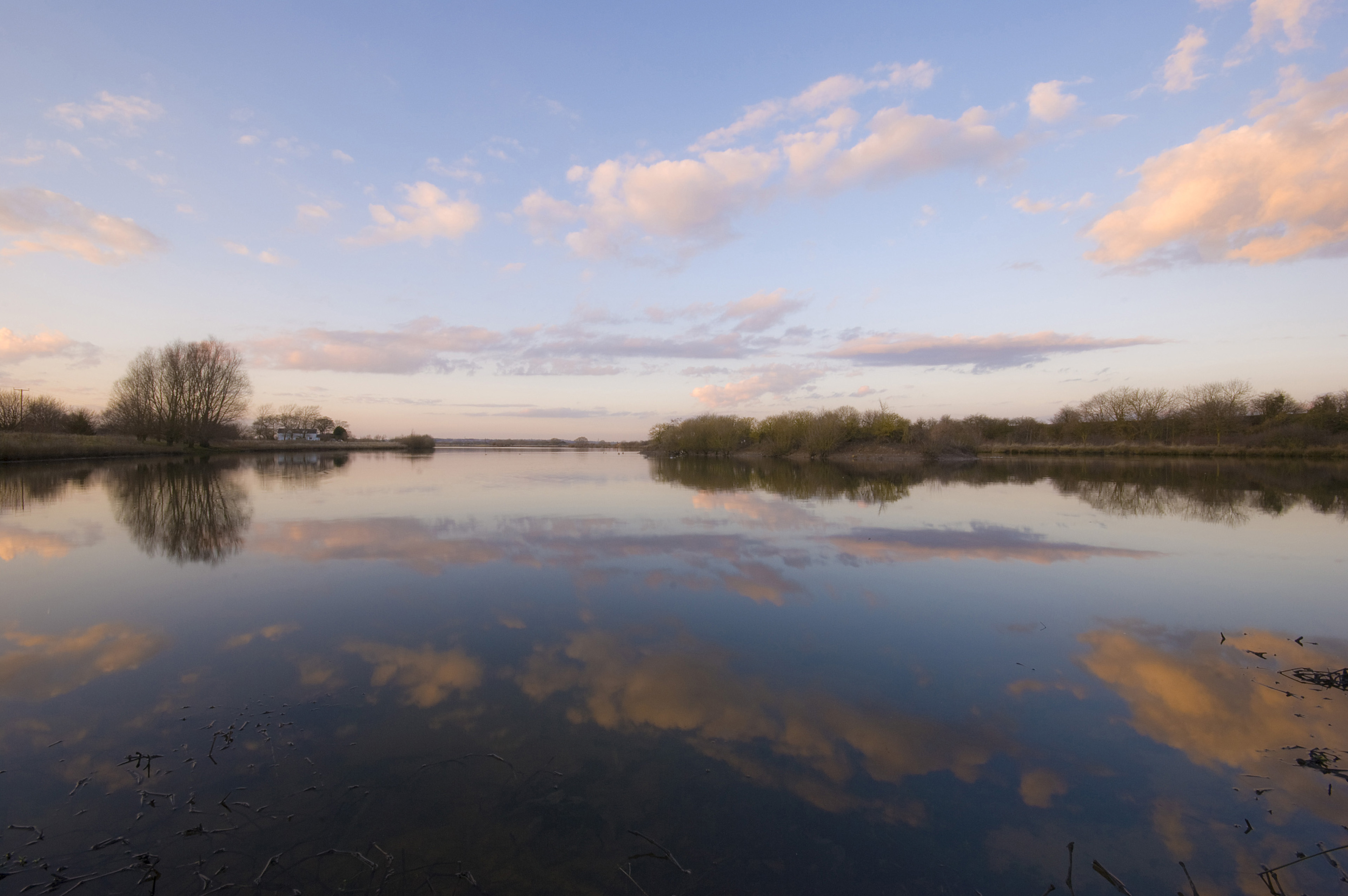
- View north of the western lake

- Location within the United Kingdom
- Location: National Forest, Staffordshire, United Kingdom
- Coordinates: 52.727461°N 1.720452°W
- Type: Quarry lake
- Surface area: West: 11 ha (27 acres); East: 2.7 ha (6.7 acres)

Croxall Lakes is a nature reserve located between the villages of Croxall and Alrewas, Staffordshire, in the United Kingdom. The nature reserve comprises two lakes and grassland between them. The lakes were formed through the quarrying of sand and gravel deposits, these excavations subsequently flooded and were then restored to create the nature reserve. The site is managed by Staffordshire Wildlife Trust and owned by the National Forest Company. The reserve is an important stop off point for a wide variety of migrating birds due to its location at the meeting point of three rivers, the Trent, Tame and Mease.

== Location ==
Croxall Lakes is located between the villages of Alrewas and Croxall in the south east of the county of Staffordshire in the Midlands of England. The lakes lie directly to the east of the National Memorial Arboretum and adjacent to the confluence of the River Tame and River Mease with the River Trent.

The site owes its existence to its geology, which comprises Quaternary age deposits of sand and gravel, formed during the last ice age. Like many similar deposits in the Trent Valley floodplain these deposits have been excavated for use in industry. During the 1990s, the site was extensively quarried by Lafarge Aggregates, creating deep pits which subsequently flooded. During the early 2000s, quarry operations ceased and the site was bought by the National Forest Company to be restored and retained as a nature reserve. The lakes now lie at the southern edge of the National Forest and serve as a gateway into the forest.

== Features ==

The reserve is 24.2 hectares (60 acres) in extent, centred on former sand and gravel workings. The reserve comprises two lakes split by an elevated main railway line carrying the Cross Country Route. The west side is dominated by an 11 hectares (27 acres) lake. The east side has lowland wet grassland, rushy pastures and mature trees surrounding the 2.7 hectares (6.7 acres) lake. Access is available from the car park at the southern end of the reserve, and there are hard pathways. On the lake shores are a variety of bird hides and screens.

On the north eastern shore of the western lake is a Noon Column. Erected in 2006 as part of the National Forest Company's LANDshapes project, the Noon Column was created by David Nash and is sculpted from English oak. The sun will shine through the vertical slot for 10–15 minutes at 'true' noon on midsummer and midwinter's days, creating a line of light in the shadow cast by the column.

== Wildlife ==
The location of the lakes, at the meeting point of three rivers makes it an ideal stop off point for migrating birds. Different birds use the reserve at different times of the year. In winter ducks such as mallard, Eurasian teal, wigeon, common goldeneye and northern shoveler are on the lake. In the early summer lapwing, oystercatcher, redshank and ringed plover breed in the reserve. Other birds that may be on the reserve include the short-eared owl, skylark, Canada goose and song thrush. Otters and water voles are amongst the mammals in the reserve.

The Staffordshire Wildlife Trust have undertaken a number of projects to restore the site as a wildlife haven. These works include excavation of scrapes for wading birds and the creation of shallows and reedbeds on the two main lakes providing cover and nesting areas for breeding birds. Parts of the banks have been re-profiled and the resulting soil deposited into the lake to make more shallows and larger reedbeds. The process is known as 'river braiding' and creates a diversity of river features with still pools, shallow riffles and gravel islands which helps to restore natural river processes and better wildlife habitat.

The River Mease which joins the River Trent at the eastern extent of the site is a Site of Special Scientific Interest due to its populations of otters, native white-clawed crayfish and spined loach.

== Ownership and management ==
The reserve lies within the National Forest and is in the care of the Staffordshire Wildlife Trust. The National Forest Company bought the site from Lafarge in 2000 with financial assistance from Severn Trent Water and development works were funded by Staffordshire Environmental Fund, the Environment Agency and DEFRA.

== Gallery ==
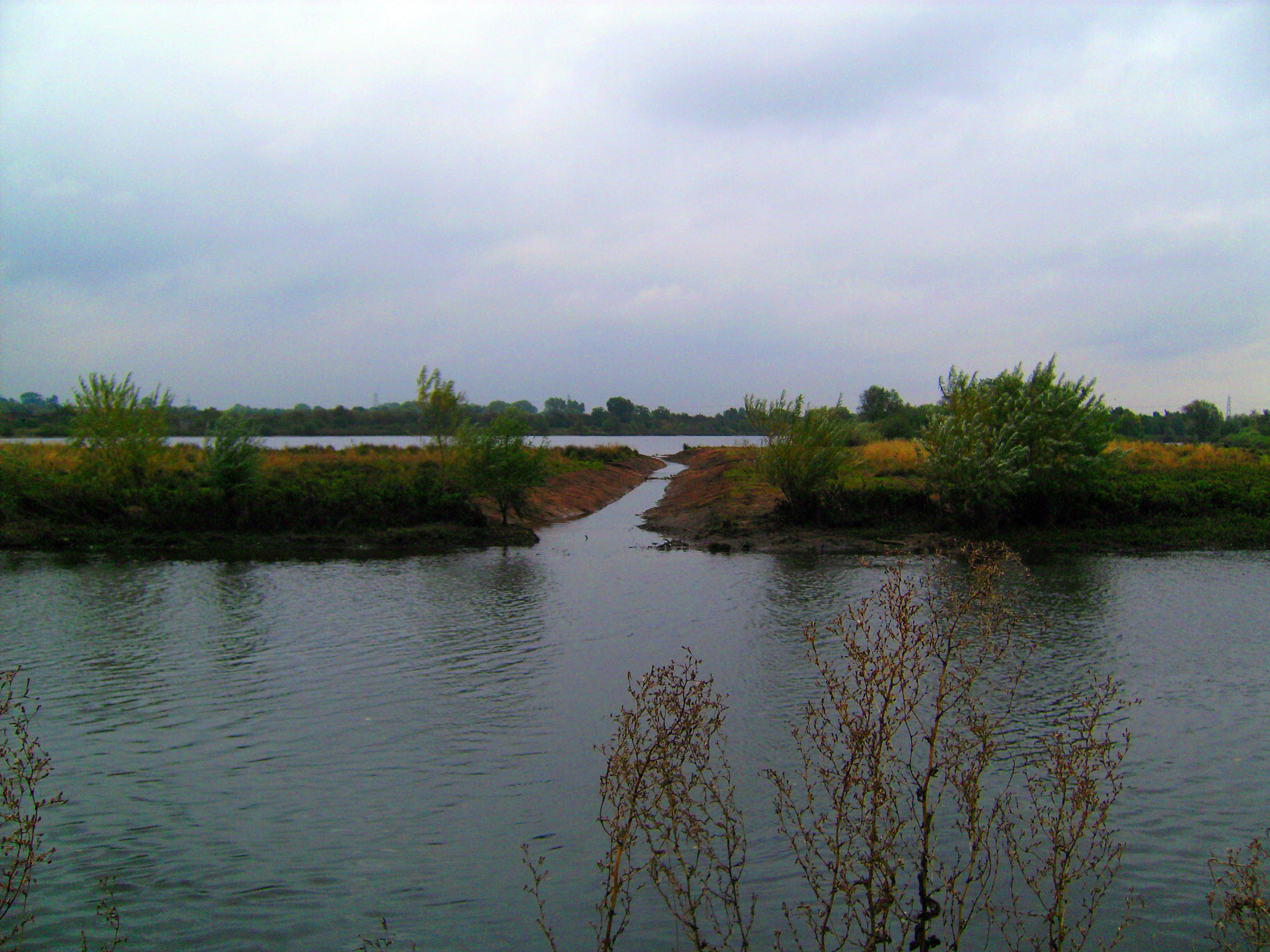
The larger lake viewed across the lower Tame from the National Memorial Arboretum, showing a connecting channel, allowing flood water to flow between river and lake.

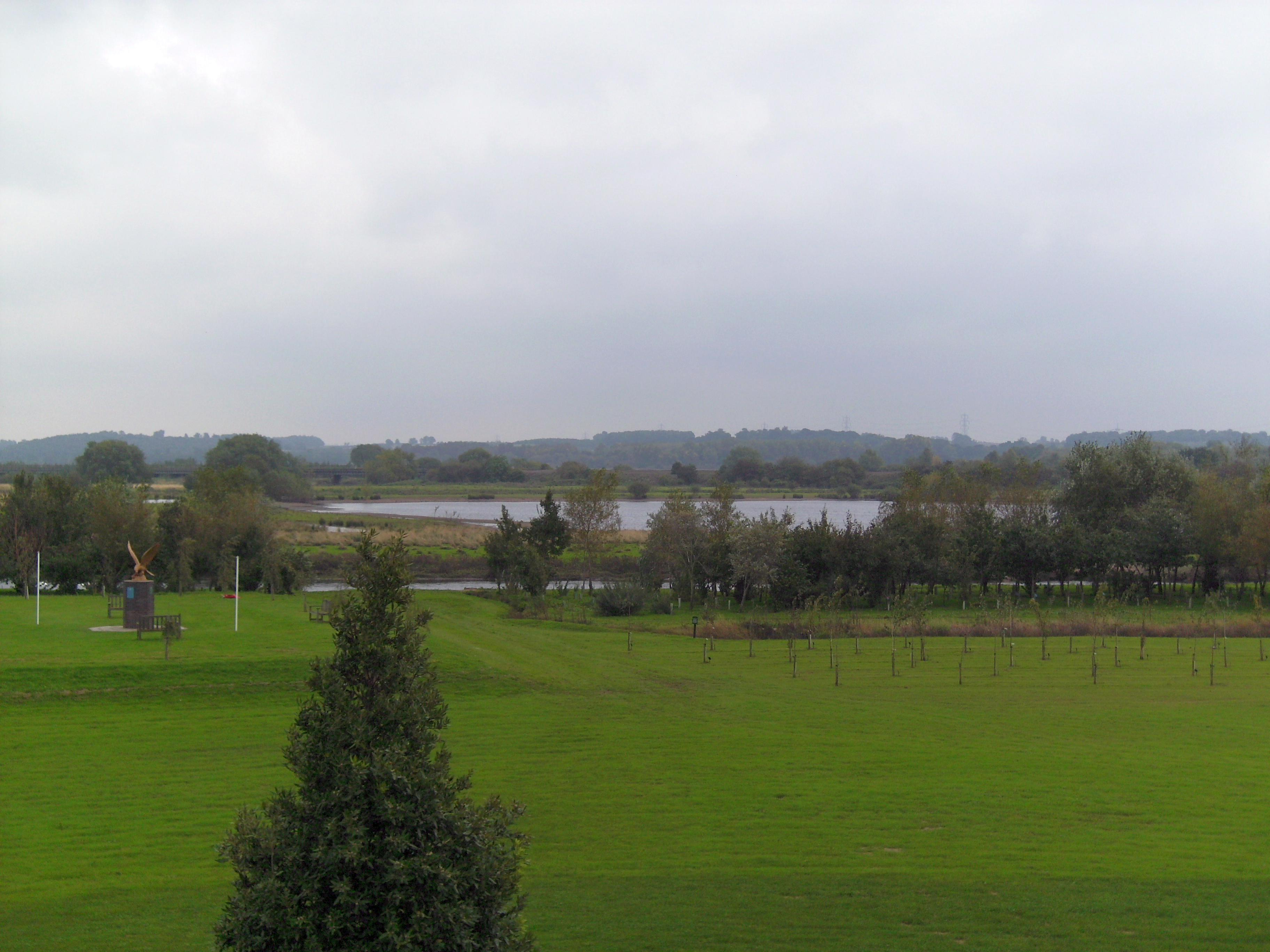
Croxall lakes viewed from highest point of Arboretum, across the Tame.

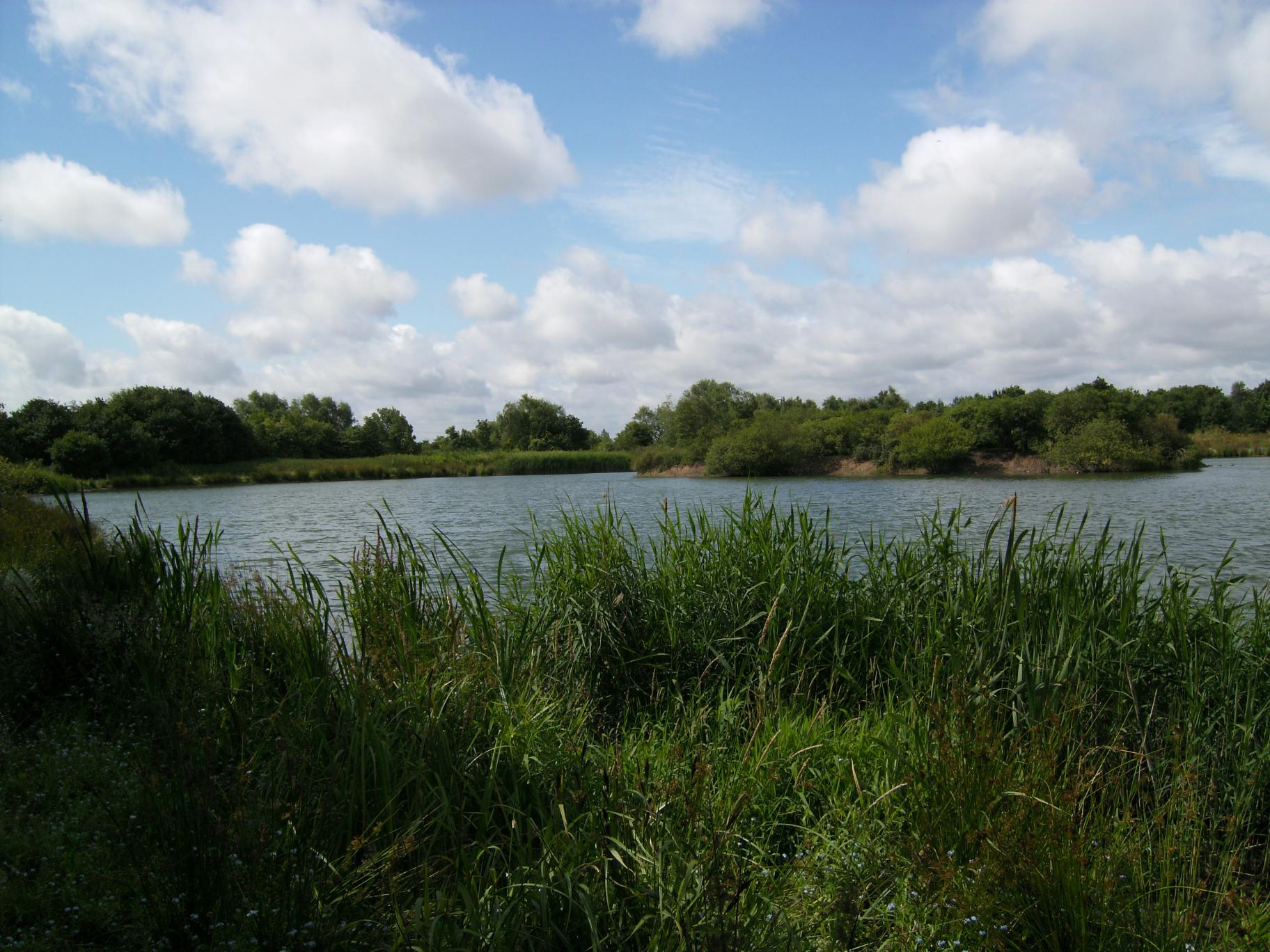
View westward across the main, western lake at Croxall, which is about 11 hectares in area. The Tame lies below the embankment on the far side of the lake.
