= Joseph Potter (architect) =

British architect

Joseph Potter (1756–1842) was an English architect and builder from Lichfield, Staffordshire in the United Kingdom. Potter had a considerable practice in Staffordshire and its neighbouring counties in the late eighteenth and early nineteenth centuries. Potter lived in Pipehill, south-west of Lichfield, and had his office in St John's Street. Joseph Potter's son, Joseph Potter Jnr, took over his father's practice after his death and went on to design many of his buildings in the late nineteenth century.

== Biography ==
Early in Joseph Potter's career as an architect, he was employed by James Wyatt (a prominent architect at the time) to supervise the alterations to Lichfield Cathedral in 1788–93 and Hereford Cathedral in 1790–93. In this period, he also worked under Wyatt in the repair to St Michael's Church, Coventry (now St Michael's Cathedral) in 1794 and the rebuilding of Plas Newydd, Anglesey for the 1st Marquess of Anglesey. At Plas Newydd, it is thought Potter is solely responsible for the design and build of the Gothic chapel.

Potter became the established architect at Lichfield Cathedral, overseeing repairs to the south-west spire in 1794, the restoration of the vaults in the north transept in 1795–97 and the restoration of the west face of the cathedral in 1820–22. Potter was the county surveyor of Staffordshire for 45 years until he died in 1842. Potter was also an engineer for the Grand Trunk Canal Company.

Potter had three sons, all of whom followed in the family profession. Robert Potter (c. 1795–1854) was the eldest son; he became an architect and went on to design numerous buildings. Joseph Potter Jr. (c. 1797–1875) took over his father's practice after his death and went on to design many buildings, including the Guildhall and Clock Tower in Lichfield. James Potter (c. 1801–1857), the youngest son, became a civil engineer working mainly on canals and railways. Other architects, Thomas Johnson and James Fowler of Louth, were pupils of Joseph Potter and were influenced by his methods.

== List of architectural works ==
- 1788–93 – Lichfield Cathedral (restorations with James Wyatt)
- 1790–93 – Hereford Cathedral (restorations with James Wyatt)
- 1793 – The Old Vicarage, Hanbury, Staffordshire
- 1794 – Lichfield Cathedral (repairs to south-west spire)
- 1794 – St Michael's Church (now Cathedral) Coventry, (repaired tower with James Wyatt)
- 1795–97 – Lichfield Cathedral (restoration of vaults in north transept)
- 1795–1823 – Plas Newydd, Anglesey (with James Wyatt, solely responsible for the Gothic chapel)
- 1800-2 – Newton's College, Lichfield
- 1802 – Judge's House, County Buildings, Stafford
- 1816 – Causeway Bridge, Bird Street, Lichfield
- 1818 – School House, Market Place, Penkridge
- 1818 – St Michael's Church (now Cathedral), Coventry (restoration)
- 1818 – Staffordshire General Lunatic Asylum, Stafford
- 1819–20 – Christ Church, Burntwood
- 1820–22 – Lichfield Cathedral (restoration to west front)
- 1822 – Caernarfon Baths & Assembly Rooms (now part of Bangor University)
- 1824 – Chetwynd Bridge, Alrewas
- 1826–27 – Freeford Hall, nr Lichfield, (enlarged for William Dyott)
- 1826–29 – St Mary's Church, Bramall Lane, Sheffield
- 1826–31 – Beaudesert House (alterations to gothic hall)
- 1829–30 – High Bridge, Mavesyn Ridware
- 1829–30 – St John Baptist Church, Tamworth
- 1832 – Sts Peter & Paul Church, Newport
- 1833–34 – Wadsley Church, Sheffield
- 1835 – Holy Cross Church, Lichfield
- 1835–38 – St Mary's RC College, New Oscott

== Gallery ==
Buildings and Structures designed by Joseph Potter Snr.
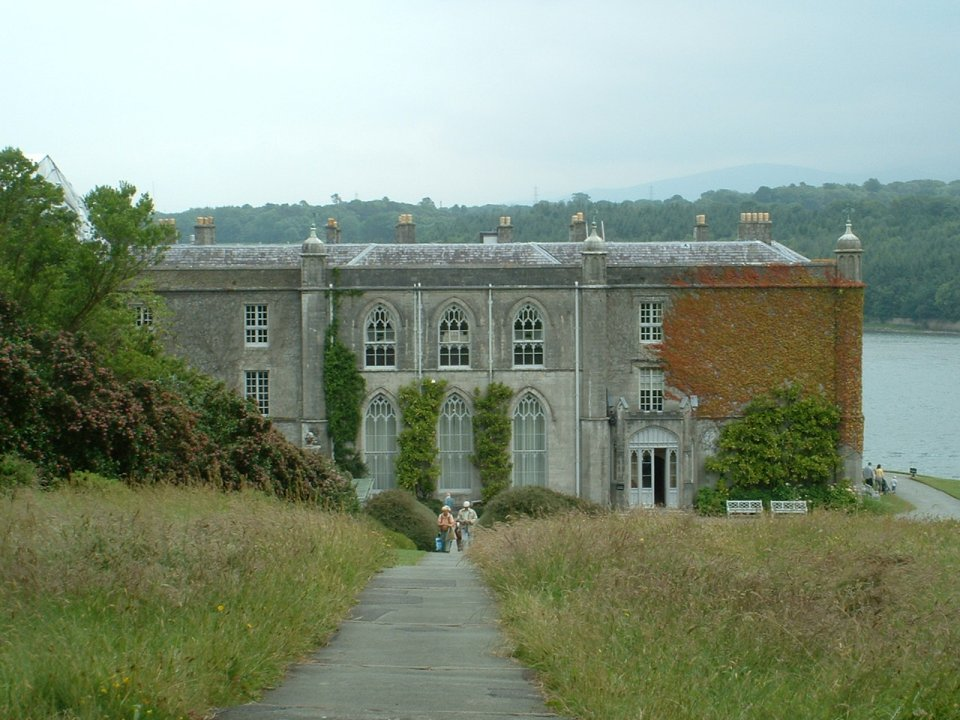
Plas Newydd, Anglesey

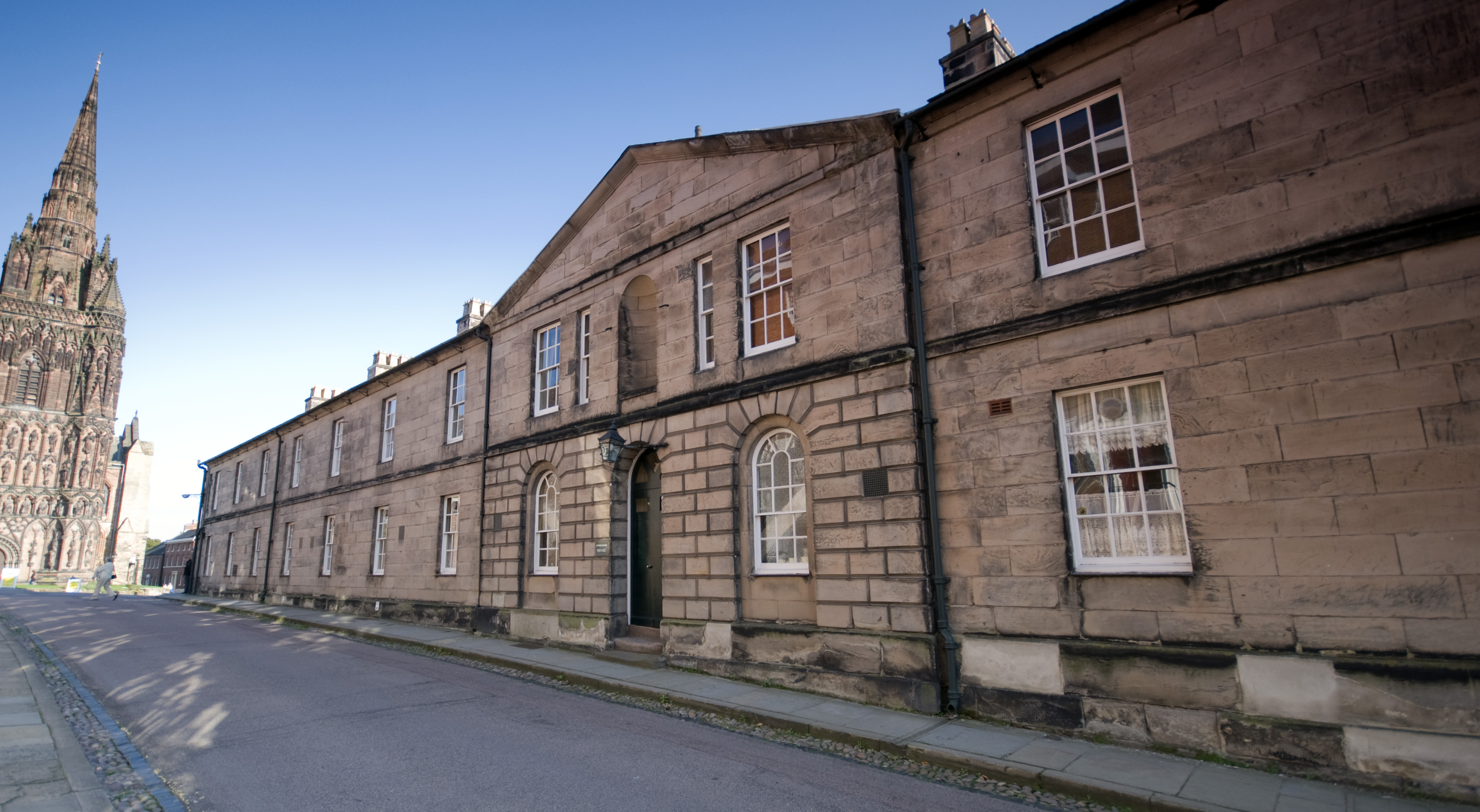
Newton's College, Lichfield

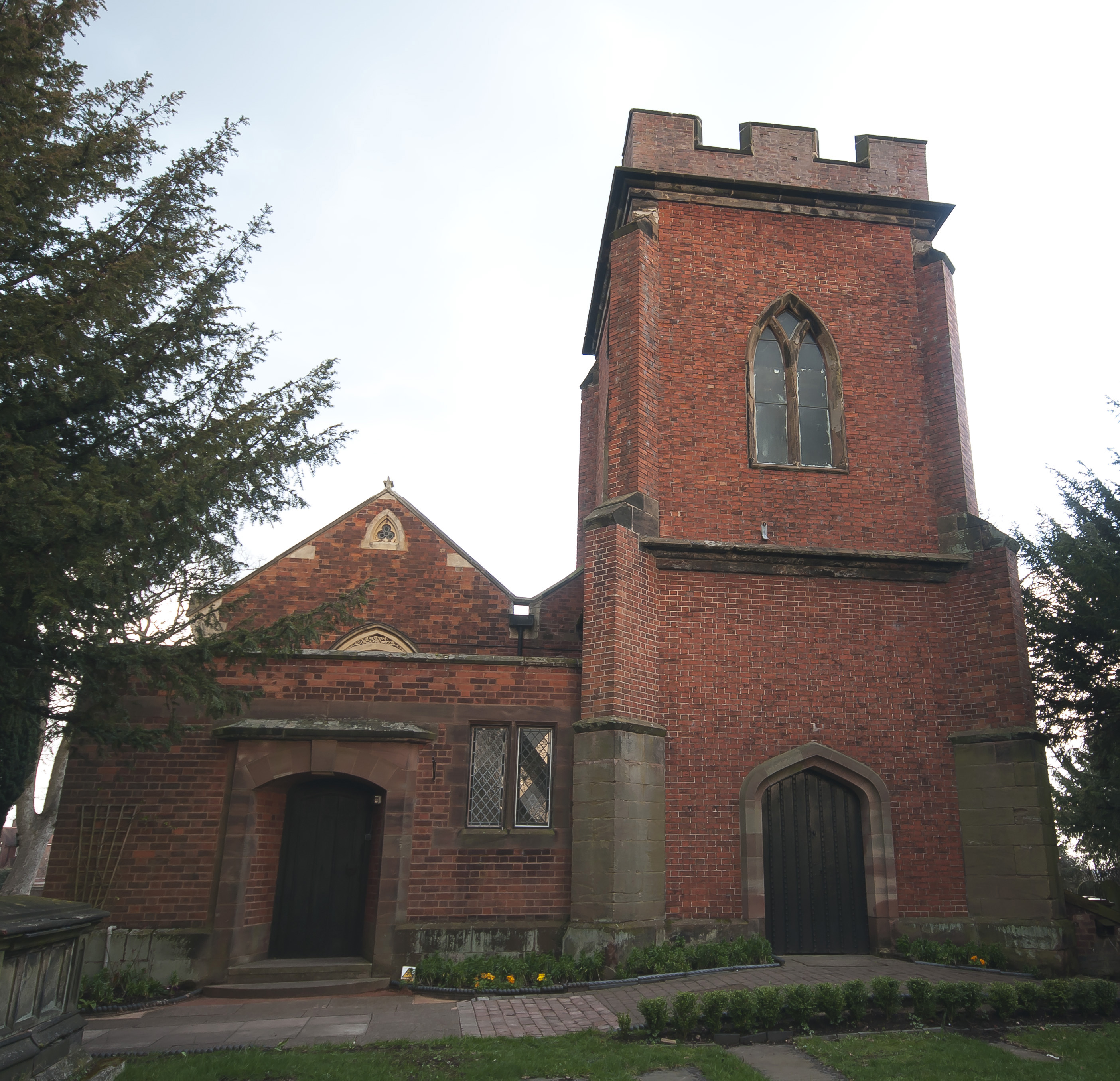
Christchurch, Burntwood

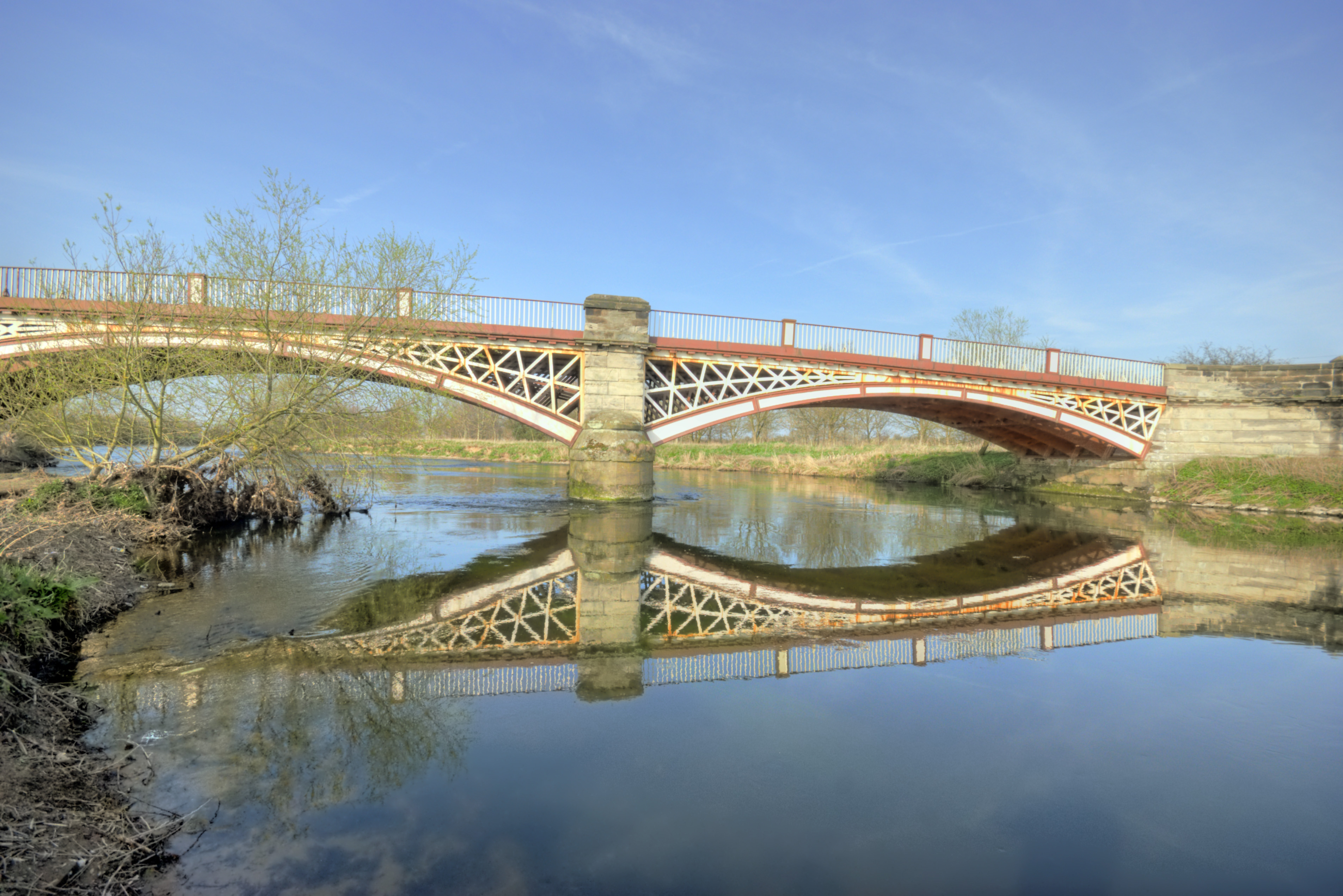
Chetwynd Bridge, Alrewas

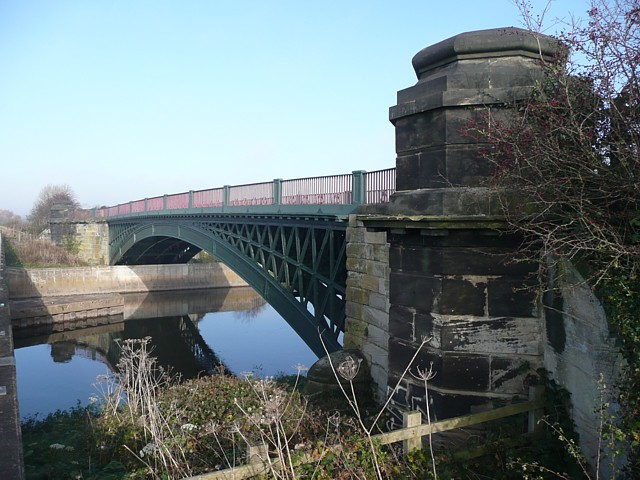
High Bridge, Mavesyn Ridware

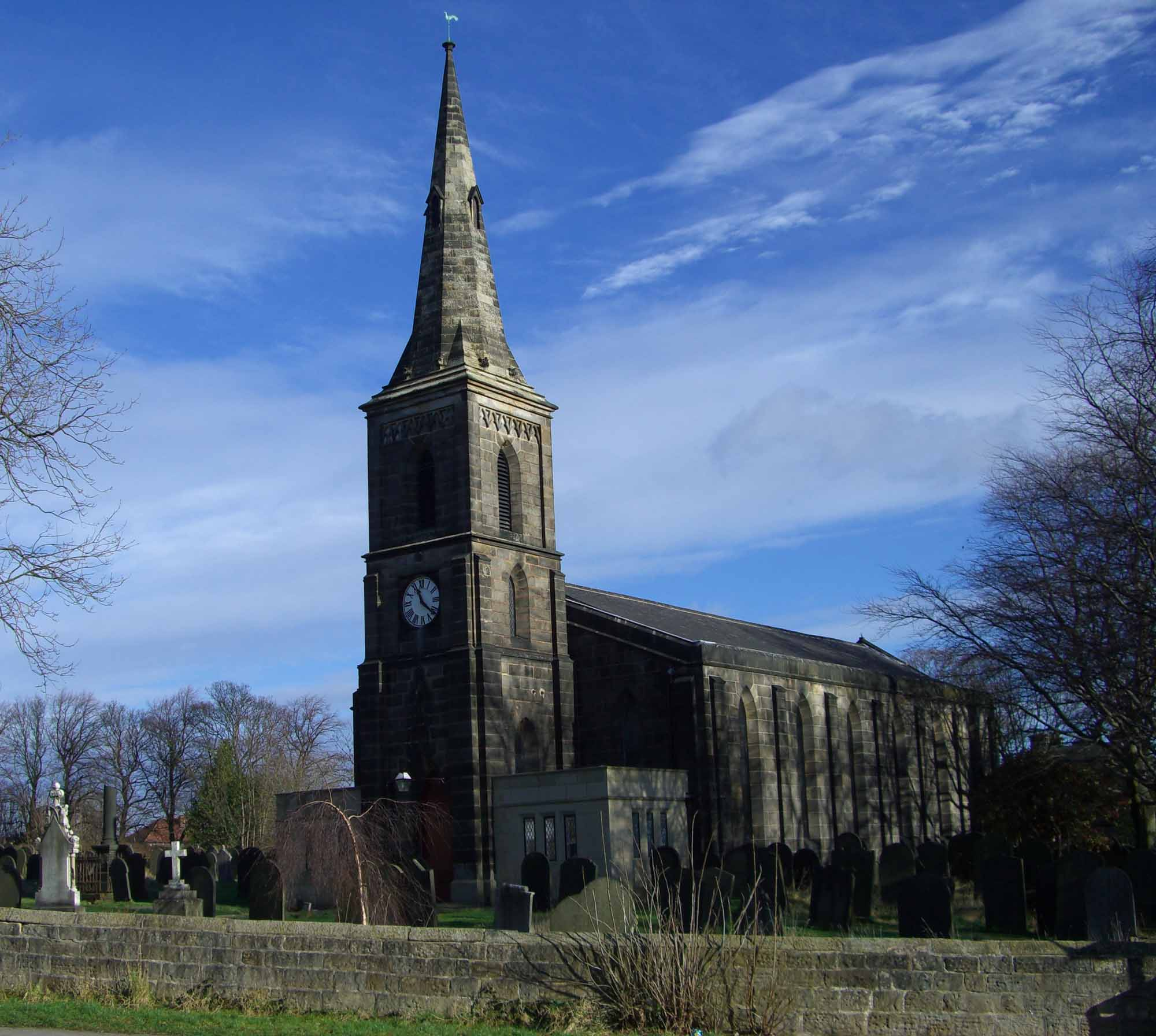
Wadsley Church, Sheffield

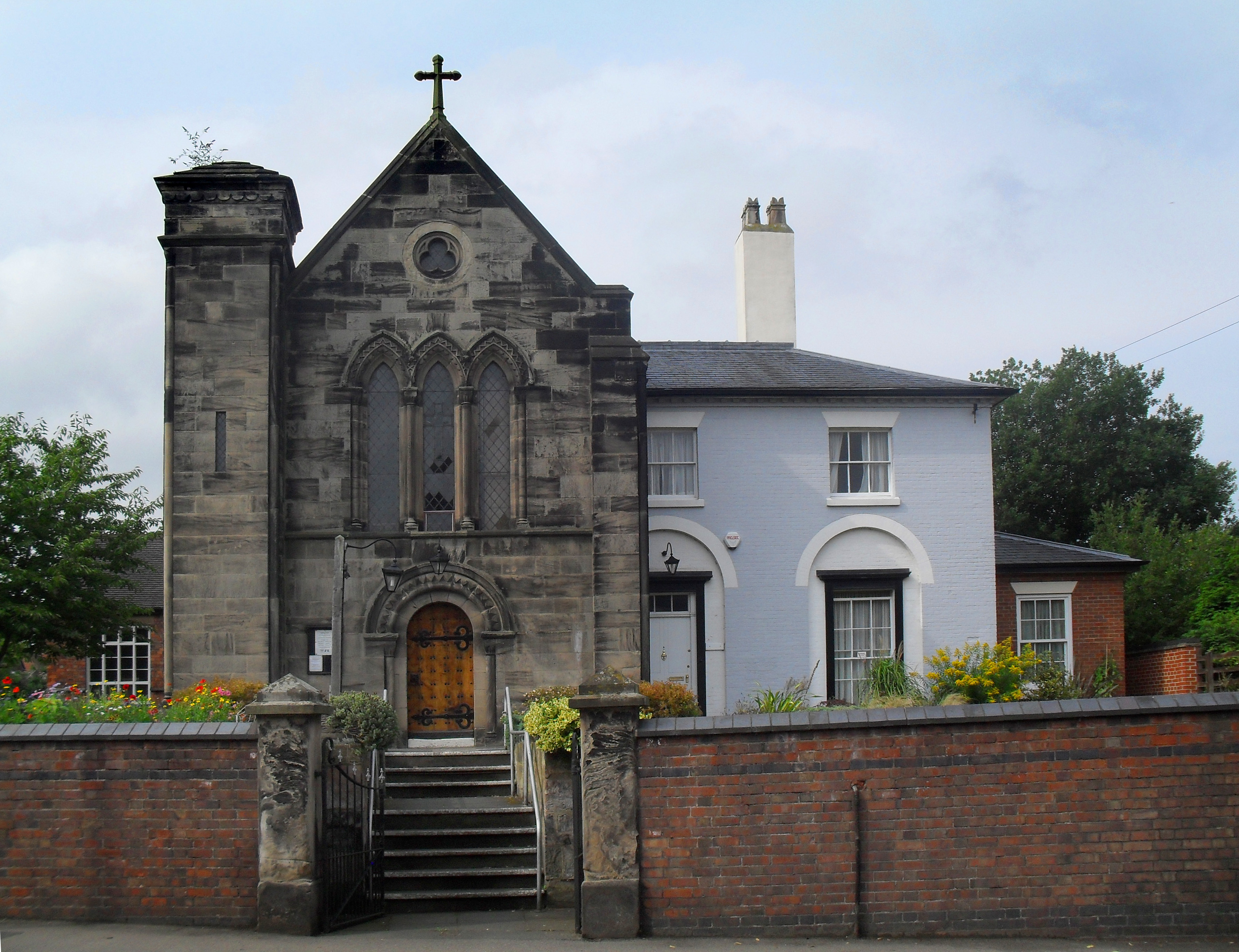
Holy Cross, Lichfield

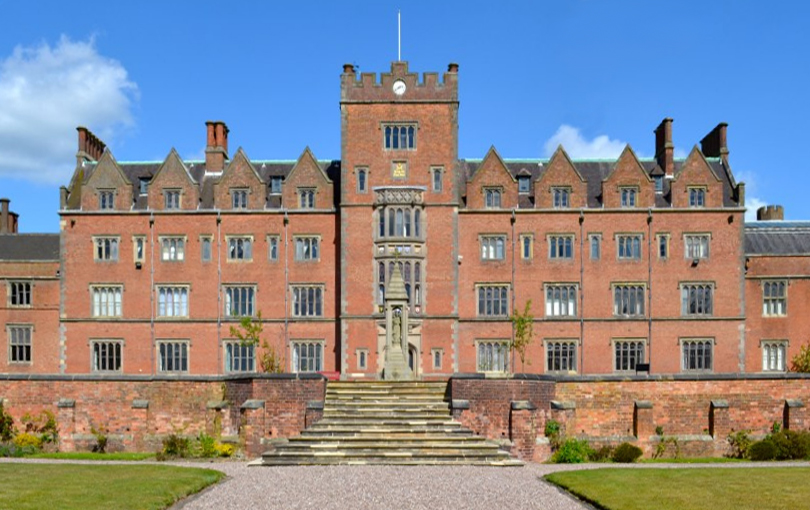
St Mary's College, Oscott

== See also ==
- James Wyatt
