= Edingale =

Village in Staffordshire, England

Coordinates: 52.708°N 1.683°W

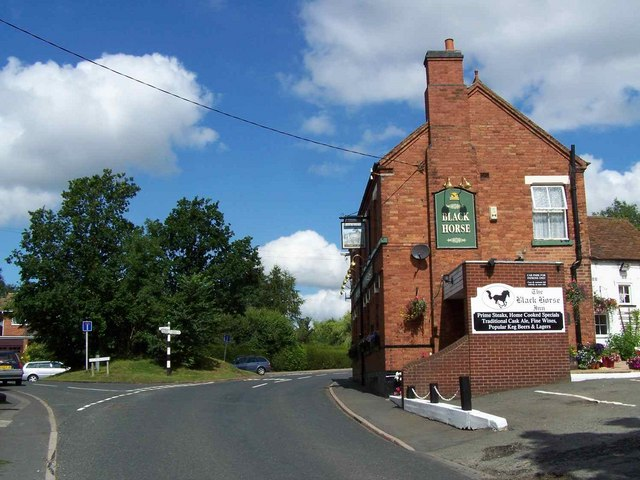
- The Black Horse

- Location within Staffordshire
- Population: 632 (2011)
- OS grid reference: SK214122
- Civil parish: Edingale
- District: Lichfield
- Shire county: Staffordshire
- Region: West Midlands
- Country: England
- Sovereign state: United Kingdom
- Post town: TAMWORTH
- Postcode district: B79
- Dialling code: 01827
- Police: Staffordshire
- Fire: Staffordshire
- Ambulance: West Midlands
- UK Parliament: Tamworth
- Website: www.edingalevillage.co.uk

Edingale is a village and civil parish in Lichfield District, Staffordshire, England. It lies on the River Mease, around 7 miles (11 km) north of Tamworth. Historically, the village is shared with Derbyshire. In 2001 the parish had a population of 598, increasing to 632 at the 2011 census.

== History ==
Edingale was mentioned in the Domesday Book as part of Derbyshire and belonging to Henry de Ferrers and being worth two shillings. The name of the village comes from Old English, with the meaning nook of land of Edin's (or Eadwine's) people.

Until the late 19th century the village of Edingale was divided between the chapelry of Edingale, within Alrewas parish in Staffordshire, and the parish of Croxall, in Derbyshire.

In 1831 the population of the Staffordshire village was 177. By 1851 it had risen to 197, on about 850 acres of land, when the lord of the manor was the Earl of Lichfield, though the land belonged to a number of other persons.

Formerly in Tamworth Rural District, the parish became part of Lichfield Rural District during the boundary changes of 1934. The civil parish of Croxall was incorporated into Edingale at the same time.

== Landmarks ==
A number of houses in the village are listed Grade II, as is the Church of the Holy Trinity and associated buildings. The village of Croxall also has a number of historic buildings. Chetwynd Bridge, an early cast-iron arch bridge, crosses the River Tame from neighbouring Alrewas on the western edge of the parish.

== Sport ==
The village has 1 football team Edingale Swifts. they will play the 2016–2017 season in Division 3 of the Tamworth and District Sunday Football League. They won the Division Three league and cup double in 2015–16 season with an unbeaten league record.

The Black Horse Edingale were the villages other football team but they folded in December 2013.

== See also ==
- Listed buildings in Edingale
