= Croxall =

Hamlet in Staffordshire, England

Coordinates: 52.721°N 1.708°W

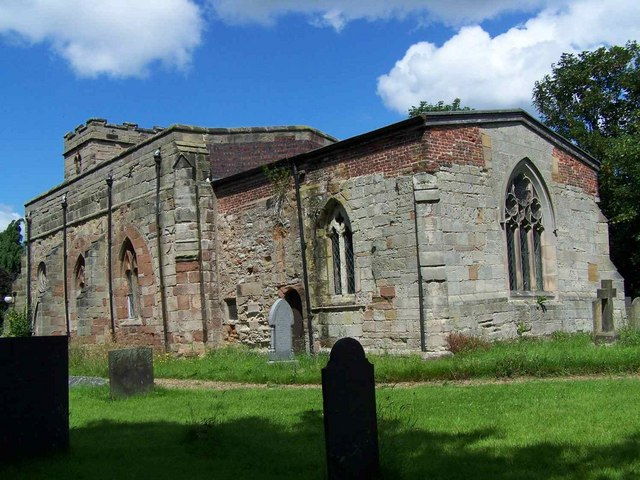
- St John's parish church

- Location within Staffordshire
- OS grid reference: SK1913
- Civil parish: Edingale
- District: Lichfield
- Shire county: Staffordshire
- Region: West Midlands
- Country: England
- Sovereign state: United Kingdom
- Post town: Lichfield
- Postcode district: WS13
- Dialling code: 01283
- Police: Staffordshire
- Fire: Staffordshire
- Ambulance: West Midlands

Croxall is a hamlet and former civil parish, now in the parish of Edingale, in the Lichfield district of Staffordshire, England. The settlement today is mainly the Church of England parish church of St John and Croxall Hall. On 30 September 1895 the part in Derbyshire was transferred to Staffordshire meaning Croxall was entirely in Staffordshire. In 1931 the parish had a population of 184.

== History ==
In the Domesday Book, Croxall is mentioned as an outlying farm of Weston-on-Trent and listed among the lands given to Henry de Ferrers by the king, William I of England. The land given to Henry included 2 acres (0.81 ha) of pasture that was valued at £4.

The lordship of the manor of Croxall was held for several centuries by underlords of the Ferrers, the Curzon family, an early Anglo-Norman family seated at Derbyshire since the 12th century. A Curzon heiress carried the manor and Croxall Hall to the Sackvilles, Earls of Dorset, who in turn conveyed the manor to the Prinsep family, heirs of John Prinsep, an early Anglo-Indian merchant and later Member of Parliament.

On the death in 1849 of Thomas Prinsep, High Sheriff of Derbyshire, the manor of Croxall was inherited by his nephew Thomas Levett-Prinsep. St John's parish church contains memorials to all four families, as well as the Horton family of nearby Catton Hall, a member of whom (Anne Wilmot-Horton) prompted Lord Byron to write his famous poem beginning with the lines: "She walks in beauty, like the night....".

On 1 April 1934 the parish was abolished and merged with Edingale.

== See also ==
- Croxall Lakes
- Listed buildings in Edingale
