= Lichfield District Council elections =

Local government elections in Staffordshire, England

Lichfield District Council elections are held every four years. Lichfield District Council is the local authority for the non-metropolitan district of Lichfield in Staffordshire, England. Since the last boundary changes in 2015, 47 councillors have been elected from 22 wards.

== Council elections ==
- 1973 Lichfield District Council election
- 1976 Lichfield District Council election
- 1979 Lichfield District Council election (New ward boundaries)
- 1983 Lichfield District Council election
- 1987 Lichfield District Council election
- 1991 Lichfield District Council election (District boundary changes took place but the number of seats remained the same)
- 1995 Lichfield District Council election (District boundary changes took place but the number of seats remained the same)
- 1999 Lichfield District Council election
- 2003 Lichfield District Council election (New ward boundaries)
- 2007 Lichfield District Council election
- 2011 Lichfield District Council election
- 2015 Lichfield District Council election (New ward boundaries)
- 2019 Lichfield District Council election
- 2023 Lichfield District Council election

== Results maps ==
2003 results map

2007 results map

2011 results map

2015 results map

2019 results map

2023 results map

== By-election results ==
=== 1999-2003 ===
Fazeley By-Election 27 July 2000
Party	Candidate	Votes	%	±%
Labour	Jim Littlefield	380	50.2	+11.5
Conservative	Frank Worrall	287	37.9	+14.2
Liberal Democrats	Charles Robinson	90	11.9	+11.9
Majority		93	12.3	
Turnout		757	22.1	
Labour gain from Independent		Swing		

All Saints By-Election 11 April 2002
Party	Candidate	Votes	%	±%
Conservative	Brenda Constable	188	49.2	+2.7
Labour	Hazel Worrallo	160	41.9	−11.6
Liberal Democrats	R Paul	34	8.9	+8.9
Majority		28	7.3	
Turnout		382		
Conservative gain from Labour		Swing		

Boney Hay By-Election 11 April 2002
Party	Candidate	Votes	%	±%
Labour	J James	292	63.6	−7.8
Conservative	M Bamborough	114	24.8	−3.6
Liberal Democrats	K Morgan	53	11.5	+11.5
Majority		178	38.8	
Turnout		459	19.0	
Labour hold		Swing		

Summerfield By-Election 11 April 2002
Party	Candidate	Votes	%	±%
Labour	D Isaacs	194	58.1	
Conservative	K Humphreys	84	25.1	
Liberal Democrats	I Jackson	56	16.8	
Majority		110	33.0	
Turnout		334	15.3	
Labour hold		Swing		

=== 2003-2007 ===
Alrewas and Fradley By-Election 5 February 2004
Party	Candidate	Votes	%	±%
Conservative		557	53.8	−1.5
Liberal Democrats		352	34.0	+12.3
Labour		126	12.2	−10.8
Majority		205	19.8	
Turnout		1,035	26.0	
Conservative hold		Swing		

Chadsmead By-Election 15 December 2005
Party	Candidate	Votes	%	±%
Conservative	Terence Thomas	192	39.2	−5.9
Labour	Darren Gilbert	181	36.9	−4.3
Liberal Democrats	Marion Bland	117	23.9	+10.2
Majority		11	2.3	
Turnout		490	18.6	
Conservative gain from Labour		Swing		

=== 2007-2011 ===
Whittington By-Election 9 July 2009
Party	Candidate	Votes	%	±%
Conservative	Rob Strachan	345	65.1	−5.1
Liberal Democrats	Penny Bennion	185	34.9	+5.1
Majority		160	30.2	
Turnout		530		
Conservative hold		Swing		

=== 2011-2015 ===
Fazeley By-Election 30 May 2013
Party	Candidate	Votes	%	±%
Conservative	Doug Pullen	423	53.0	−6.7
Labour	Dave Whatton	375	47.0	+6.7
Majority		48	6.0	
Turnout		798		
Conservative hold		Swing		

Chadsmead By-Election 30 January 2014
Party	Candidate	Votes	%	±%
Liberal Democrats	Marion Bland	206	36.0	+4.8
Labour	Caroline Wood	157	27.4	−1.6
UKIP	Bob Green	108	18.8	+18.8
Conservative	Jon O'Hagan	102	17.8	−22.0
Majority		49	8.6	
Turnout		573		
Conservative gain from Liberal Democrats		Swing		

=== 2015-2019 ===
Chadsmead By-Election 18 February 2016
Party	Candidate	Votes	%	±%
Liberal Democrats	Paul Ray	300	40.0	+14.9
Labour	Colin Ball	195	26.0	+1.6
Conservative	Brian McMullan	159	21.2	−12.2
UKIP	Jan Higgins	73	9.7	−7.4
Green	Adam Elsdon	23	3.1	+3.1
Majority		105	14.0	
Turnout		750		
Liberal Democrats hold		Swing		

Fazeley By-Election 4 May 2017
Party	Candidate	Votes	%	±%
Conservative	Brian Hoult	652	61.5	+21.9
Labour	Glen Mynott	343	32.3	+5.9
Green	Edwin Jones	66	6.2	−1.2
Majority		309	29.1	
Turnout		1,061		
Conservative gain from UKIP		Swing		

Stowe By-Election 22 February 2018
Party	Candidate	Votes	%	±%
Conservative	Joanne Grange	513	44.8	−9.1
Labour	Don Palmer	299	26.1	−0.9
Liberal Democrats	Jeyan Anketell	217	19.0	+19.0
Something New	Philip Peter	59	5.2	+5.2
Green	Mat Hayward	56	4.9	−14.2
Majority		214	18.7	
Turnout		1,144		
Conservative hold		Swing		

Curborough By-Election 5 July 2018
Party	Candidate	Votes	%	±%
Labour	Colin Ball	309	60.4	+27.2
Conservative	Jayne Marks	169	33.0	−8.4
Liberal Democrats	Lee Cadwallader-Allen	34	6.6	+6.6
Majority		140	27.3	
Turnout		512		
Labour gain from Conservative		Swing		

Stowe By-Election 27 September 2018
Party	Candidate	Votes	%	±%
Conservative	Angela Lax	499	44.1	−0.7
Labour	Donald Palmer	440	38.9	+12.8
Liberal Democrats	Richard Rathbone	193	17.0	−2.0
Majority		59	5.2	
Turnout		1,132		
Conservative hold		Swing		

=== 2019-2023 ===
Summerfield and All Saints By-Election 6 May 2021
Party	Candidate	Votes	%	±%
Conservative	Heather Tranter	783	57.3	+21.7
Labour	Michael Galvin	392	28.7	−8.6
Liberal Democrats	John Taylor	191	14.0	+14.0
Majority		391	28.6	
Turnout		1,366		
Conservative gain from Labour		Swing		

Armitage with Handsacre By-Election 16 December 2021
Party	Candidate	Votes	%	±%
Conservative	Richard Cross	458	60.3	+13.5
Labour	Mark Pritchard	301	39.7	+11.7
Majority		157	20.7	
Turnout		759		
Conservative hold		Swing		

Chasetown By-Election 3 November 2022
Party	Candidate	Votes	%	±%
Labour	Paul Taylor	318	73.3	+15.2
Conservative	Norma Bacon	116	26.7	−15.2
Majority		202	46.5	
Turnout		434		
Labour gain from Conservative		Swing		

=== 2023-2027 ===
Curborough By-Election 1 May 2025
Party	Candidate	Votes	%	±%
Reform	Matthew Wallens	381	38.5	+38.5
Conservative	Daniel Floyd	230	23.2	−12.1
Labour	Liz Stamatelatos	217	21.9	−42.8
Green	David Melhuish	92	9.3	+9.3
Liberal Democrats	Paul McDermott	70	7.1	+7.1
Majority		151	15.3	
Turnout		990		
Reform gain from Labour		Swing		

Alrewas and Fradley By-Election 24 July 2025
Party	Candidate	Votes	%	±%
Conservative	Richard Stephenson	690	42.4	−1.1
Reform	Brandon Clark	439	27.0	+27.0
Labour	Glen Bown	314	19.3	−17.9
Liberal Democrats	Morag Maclean	185	11.4	−7.9
Majority		251	15.4	
Turnout		1,628		
Conservative hold		Swing		

Armitage with Handsacre By-Election 11 December 2025
Party	Candidate	Votes	%	±%
Conservative	Martyn Punyer	630	46.7	−6.2
Reform	Andrew Clissett	431	31.9	+31.9
Labour	James Blackman	127	9.4	−23.5
Liberal Democrats	Morag Maclean	99	7.3	−6.8
Green	David Cullen	63	4.7	+4.7
Majority		199	14.7	
Turnout		1,350		
Conservative hold		Swing		
