= Listed buildings in Fisherwick =

Fisherwick is a civil parish in the district of Lichfield, Staffordshire, England. The parish contains seven listed buildings that are recorded in the National Heritage List for England. All the listed buildings are designated at Grade II, the lowest of the three grades, which is applied to "buildings of national importance and special interest". The parish is entirely rural, without any significant settlements. The listed buildings consist of three farmhouses and associated structures, a bridge over the River Tame, two bridges over the Birmingham and Fazeley Canal, and the gate piers on the drive of a house that has been demolished.

== Buildings ==
Name and location	Photograph	Date	Notes
Elford Bridge West; 52.68654°N 1.71853°W		16th century	The bridge carries a road across the former course of the River Tame. It is in red brick and stone, and consists of seven semicircular arches, the middle arch the largest. The bridge contains a parapet band, a plain parapet, and cutwaters rising to form buttresses, those flanking the middle arch becoming refuges.
Tamhorn Park Farmhouse; 52.66243°N 1.73354°W	—	Early 18th century	The farmhouse was extended to the rear in the 19th century. It is in red brick with hipped tile roofs. The main block has two storeys and an attic on a sandstone plinth, and a continuous storey band, five bays, and a central doorway with a rectangular fanlight. The windows are sashes with segmental heads, and there are three gabled dormers with hipped roofs. The rear wing and extension have two storeys, a double eaves band, three bays, and casement windows with segmental heads.
Woodhouse Farmhouse and wall 52.68682°N 1.74815°W	—	Early 18th century	A red brick farmhouse with a storey band and a tile roof, two storeys and an attic, four bays, and a rear wing. The windows are casements with segmental heads. Attached to each end of the house is a wall dating from the late 18th century that encloses a former garden to the south and west.
Fisherwick Hall Farmhouse, coach house and stable block 52.68594°N 1.74385°W	—	c. 1770	The buildings, which were designed by Capability Brown, are in red brick on a stone plinth, with sill bands, an eaves cornice, and slate roofs. They have two storeys, and form roughly a Z-shaped plan. The farmhouse has six bays, the middle two bays projecting under a pediment. The windows are sashes with keystones, and the door and windows in the middle two bays are set in semicircular arches. The coach house has nine bays, the middle bay projecting under a pediment. In the centre is a carriage entrance in a semicircular-headed arch containing a lunette, and the outer bays contain semicircular carriage arches. The stable range has ten bays, blocked semicircular arches in the ground floor, and square loft openings above.
Tamhorn Farm Bridge; 52.66513°N 1.73674°W		1780s	An accommodation bridge over the Birmingham and Fazeley Canal, it is in lime-washed brick, and consists of a single segmental arch. The bridge has a plain stone coped parapet and square end piers.
Tamhorn House Bridge; 52.66190°N 1.73497°W		1780s	An accommodation bridge over the Birmingham and Fazeley Canal, it is in lime-washed red brick with blue brick copings. It consists of a single segmental arch with a plain parapet.
Pair of gate piers at N.G.R. SK 17400827; 52.67029°N 1.74448°W	—	Early 19th century	The gate piers flank the entrance to the drive of the former Fisherwick Hall, now demolished. They are in stone with a square plan, and have round-headed niches on the front and rear. Each pier has a moulded cornice, a frieze with carved coronets, and pilaster strips on the inner sides.
