= 2011 Lichfield District Council election =

2011 UK local government election

Results of the 2011 Lichfield District Council election

The 2011 Lichfield District Council election took place on 5 May 2011 to elect members of Lichfield District Council in Staffordshire, England. The whole council - 56 members - was up for election and the Conservative Party retained overall control of the council.

== Campaign ==
Labour, Conservative, Liberal Democrats, Independent and Independent Labour candidates stood in the election. The wards elected from one to three members of the council depending on the electorate's size. candidates in wards were elected unopposed.

== Election result ==
The Conservatives maintained control of the council. They gained 2 seats and Labour gained 5. The Liberal Democrats and the two Independent councillors were eliminated from the council and no other party is represented.

Lichfield local election result 2011
| Party | Seats | Gains | Losses | Net gain/loss | Seats % | Votes % | Votes | +/− |
|---|---|---|---|---|---|---|---|---|
| Conservative | 46 | | | +2 | | 58.92 | 38,512 | |
| Labour | 10 | | | +5 | | 25.50 | 16,668 | |
| Liberal Democrats | 0 | | | -5 | | 11.88 | 7,765 | |
| UKIP | 0 | | | | | 2.23 | 1,459 | |
| Independent | 0 | | | -2 | | 1.47 | 964 | |
| Green | | | | | | 0.22 | 143 | |

== Results by ward ==
Elected candidates in bold: defending candidates marked with "*".

All Saints (2 seats)
| Party | Candidate | Votes | % | ±% |
|---|---|---|---|---|
| Conservative | **Brenda Lilian Constable*** | 630 | 30.03 | |
| Conservative | **Ken Humphreys** | 555 | 26.45 | |
| Labour | James Patrick Morgan | 393 | 18.73 | |
| Labour | Peter Van Hagen | 366 | 17.45 | |
| UKIP | Martin Dewes | 154 | 7.34 | |
| Majority | | 162 | 7.72 | |
| Turnout | | 2098 | 40.4 | |
| Conservative **hold** | | Swing | | |
| Conservative **hold** | | Swing | | |

Alrewas and Fradley (3 seats)
| Party | Candidate | Votes | % | ±% |
|---|---|---|---|---|
| Conservative | **Paul Hogan*** | 1319 | 23.21 | |
| Conservative | **Margaret Stanhope*** | 1225 | 21.56 | |
| Conservative | **Michael John Wilcox*** | 1161 | 20.43 | |
| Labour | Peter David Jones | 496 | 8.73 | |
| Labour | Paula Ann Knight | 481 | 8.46 | |
| Labour | David Peter Whatton | 479 | 8.43 | |
| Liberal Democrats | Margaret Joy Hille | 189 | 3.33 | |
| Liberal Democrats | Alison Anketell | 184 | 3.24 | |
| Liberal Democrats | Stephanie Kamm | 149 | 2.62 | |
| Majority | | 665 | 11.70 | |
| Turnout | | 5683 | 45.7 | |
| Conservative **hold** | | Swing | | |
| Conservative **hold** | | Swing | | |
| Conservative **hold** | | Swing | | |

Armitage with Handsacre (3 seats)
| Party | Candidate | Votes | % | ±% |
|---|---|---|---|---|
| Conservative | **Richard Ernest Cox*** | 911 | 21.03 | |
| Conservative | **Martyn Clive Tittley*** | 897 | 20.71 | |
| Conservative | **Thomas Marshall*** | 875 | 20.20 | |
| Labour | Steve Hyden | 572 | 13.21 | |
| Labour | Jill Hyden | 558 | 12.88 | |
| Labour | Elaine Mary Moore | 518 | 11.96 | |
| Majority | | 303 | 7.00 | |
| Turnout | | 4331 | 37.7 | |
| Conservative **hold** | | Swing | | |
| Conservative **hold** | | Swing | | |
| Conservative **hold** | | Swing | | |

Boley Park (3 seats)
| Party | Candidate | Votes | % | ±% |
|---|---|---|---|---|
| Conservative | **Janet May Eagland*** | 1319 | 24.53 | |
| Conservative | **Jeanette Ann Allsopp*** | 1255 | 23.34 | |
| Conservative | **Mark Andrew Warfield** | 1099 | 20.44 | |
| Labour | Brian Michael Pretty | 493 | 9.17 | |
| Liberal Democrats | Jo Jackson | 368 | 6.85 | |
| Liberal Democrats | Marguerite Stockdale | 325 | 6.05 | |
| Liberal Democrats | Stuart Leonard Stockdale | 264 | 4.91 | |
| UKIP | Jackie Littlewood | 253 | 4.71 | |
| Majority | | 606 | 11.27 | |
| Turnout | | 5376 | 57.2 | |
| Conservative **hold** | | Swing | | |
| Conservative **hold** | | Swing | | |
| Conservative **hold** | | Swing | | |

Boney Hay (2 seats)
| Party | Candidate | Votes | % | ±% |
|---|---|---|---|---|
| Labour | **Diane Evans** | 517 | 9.10 | |
| Labour | **Russell Heath*** | 493 | 8.67 | |
| Conservative | Pamela Helen Stokes | 377 | 6.63 | |
| Conservative | Sonia Elizabeth Wilcox | 284 | 5.00 | |
| Majority | | 116 | 2.04 | |
| Turnout | | 1671 | 37.4 | |
| Labour **hold** | | Swing | | |
| Labour **hold** | | Swing | | |

Bourne Vale (1 seat)
| Party | Candidate | Votes | % | ±% |
|---|---|---|---|---|
| Conservative | **Brian William Yeates** | | | |
| Conservative **hold** | | Swing | | |

This poll was uncontested

Burntwood Central (2 seats)
| Party | Candidate | Votes | % | ±% |
|---|---|---|---|---|
| Conservative | **Heather Tranter** | 508 | 29.66 | |
| Conservative | **Richard Charles Mosson** | 487 | 28.43 | |
| Labour | Jeremy Harold James | 372 | 21.72 | |
| Labour | Keith Cockroft | 346 | 20.20 | |
| Majority | | 115 | 6.71 | |
| Turnout | | 1713 | 37.9 | |
| Conservative **hold** | | Swing | | |
| Conservative **hold** | | Swing | | |

Chadsmead (2 seats)
| Party | Candidate | Votes | % | ±% |
|---|---|---|---|---|
| Conservative | **Mike Fryers Senior** | 416 | 21.73 | |
| Conservative | **Terry Thomas** | 385 | 20.11 | |
| Liberal Democrats | Marion Patricia Bland* | 326 | 17.03 | |
| Labour | Neil Trevor Guest | 303 | 15.83 | |
| Labour | Roger Morgan | 278 | 14.52 | |
| Liberal Democrats | Tony Harvey | 206 | 10.76 | |
| Majority | | 59 | 3.08 | |
| Turnout | | 1914 | 36.7 | |
| Conservative **gain** from Liberal Democrats | | Swing | | |
| Conservative **hold** | | Swing | | |

Chase Terrace (3 seats)
| Party | Candidate | Votes | % | ±% |
|---|---|---|---|---|
| Labour | **Eric Nathaniel Drinkwater** | 775 | 19.77 | |
| Labour | **Sue Woodward** | 736 | 18.77 | |
| Labour | **John Thomas Walker** | 728 | 18.57 | |
| Conservative | Steve Tranter* | 588 | 15.00 | |
| Conservative | Richard Andrew James Bamborough* | 562 | 14.33 | |
| Conservative | Thomas Neil Loughbrough | 532 | 13.57 | |
| Majority | | 140 | 3.57 | |
| Turnout | | 3921 | 37.2 | |
| Labour **gain** from Conservative | | Swing | | |
| Labour **gain** from Conservative | | Swing | | |
| Labour **gain** from Conservative | | Swing | | |

Chasetown (2 seats)
| Party | Candidate | Votes | % | ±% |
|---|---|---|---|---|
| Labour | **Stephen Daniel Taylor** | 454 | 24.71 | |
| Labour | **Keith Andrew Willis-Croft** | 389 | 21.18 | |
| Conservative | Marilyn Patricia Bamborough | 362 | 19.71 | |
| Conservative | Barry Davis Diggle | 259 | 14.10 | |
| Independent | Colin Waldron | 187 | 10.18 | |
| Independent | Darren Michael Oliver Ennis | 186 | 10.13 | |
| Majority | | 27 | 1.47 | |
| Turnout | | 1837 | 33.8 | |
| Labour **hold** | | Swing | | |
| Labour **hold** | | Swing | | |

Colton and Mavesyn Ridware (1 seat)
| Party | Candidate | Votes | % | ±% |
|---|---|---|---|---|
| Conservative | **Shirley Ann Barnett** | | | |
| Conservative **hold** | | Swing | | |

This poll was uncontested

Curborough (3 seats)
| Party | Candidate | Votes | % | ±% |
|---|---|---|---|---|
| Conservative | **Norma Bacon*** | 668 | 36.36 | |
| Conservative | **Brian Frederick Bacon*** | 646 | 35.17 | |
| Conservative | **David Leytham** | 590 | 32.12 | |
| Labour | John Robert Brooks | 577 | 31.41 | |
| Labour | Tony Wilkins | 533 | 29.01 | |
| Labour | Colin John Ball | 497 | 27.05 | |
| Independent | John Christopher Walker* | 208 | 11.32 | |
| Liberal Democrats | Mark Anthony Ellis | 159 | 8.66 | |
| UKIP | Eileen Cope | 153 | 8.33 | |
| Liberal Democrats | Kieren Daisy Parkes | 132 | 7.19 | |
| Liberal Democrats | Lorraine Dawn Parkes | 120 | 6.53 | |
| Majority | | 13 | 0.71 | |
| Turnout | | 4283 | 42.3 | |
| Conservative **hold** | | Swing | | |
| Conservative **hold** | | Swing | | |
| Conservative **gain** from Independent | | Swing | | |

Fazeley (3 seats)
| Party | Candidate | Votes | % | ±% |
|---|---|---|---|---|
| Conservative | **Ian Victor Lewin*** | 758 | 32.60 | |
| Conservative | **Alan George Pearce** | 595 | 25.59 | |
| Labour | **Glen Mynott** | 512 | 22.02 | |
| Conservative | Hayley Taroni | 460 | 19.78 | |
| Majority | | 52 | 2.24 | |
| Turnout | | | 34.6 | 2325 |
| Conservative **hold** | | Swing | | |
| Conservative **hold** | | Swing | | |
| Labour **hold** | | Swing | | |

Hammerwich (2 seats)
| Party | Candidate | Votes | % | ±% |
|---|---|---|---|---|
| Conservative | **Val Richards*** | 651 | 31.22 | |
| Conservative | **Brett Wilson** | 484 | 23.21 | |
| Independent | Vance Wasdell | 383 | 18.37 | |
| Labour | Roderick Erskine Campbell | 345 | 16.55 | |
| UKIP | Jeffrey Anthony Sheriff | 222 | 10.65 | |
| Majority | | 101 | 4.84 | |
| Turnout | | 2085 | 43.8 | |
| Conservative **hold** | | Swing | | |
| Conservative **hold** | | Swing | | |

Highfield (2 seats)
| Party | Candidate | Votes | % | ±% |
|---|---|---|---|---|
| Conservative | **Doug Constable*** | 906 | 37.39 | |
| Conservative | **Helen Elizabeth Fisher** | 867 | 35.78 | |
| Labour | Eddie McCann | 354 | 14.61 | |
| Labour | Peter Frederick Tams | 296 | 12.22 | |
| Majority | | 513 | 21.17 | |
| Turnout | | 2423 | 42.6 | |
| Conservative **hold** | | Swing | | |
| Conservative **hold** | | Swing | | |

King's Bromley (1 seat)
| Party | Candidate | Votes | % | ±% |
|---|---|---|---|---|
| Conservative | **Ian Maxwell Pardoe Pritchard*** | | | |
| Conservative **hold** | | Swing | | |

This poll was uncontested

Leomansley (3 seats)
| Party | Candidate | Votes | % | ±% |
|---|---|---|---|---|
| Conservative | **Bob Awty** | 1015 | 16.55 | |
| Conservative | **Andrew Smith** | 981 | 15.99 | |
| Conservative | **Iain Morris Eadie** | 963 | 15.70 | |
| Liberal Democrats | Ian Jackson* | 913 | 14.88 | |
| Liberal Democrats | Derek Love* | 871 | 14.20 | |
| Liberal Democrats | John Anthony Smith | 753 | 12.28 | |
| Labour | Mark Neil Taylor | 460 | 7.50 | |
| UKIP | Trevor Cook | 178 | 2.90 | |
| Majority | | 50 | 0.82 | |
| Turnout | | 6134 | 49.6 | |
| Conservative **hold** | | Swing | | |
| Conservative **gain** from Liberal Democrats | | Swing | | |
| Conservative **gain** from Liberal Democrats | | Swing | | |

Little Aston (2 seats)
| Party | Candidate | Votes | % | ±% |
|---|---|---|---|---|
| Conservative | **Louise Elizabeth Flowith*** | 991 | 43.91 | |
| Conservative | **Joseph John Rayner Powell*** | 898 | 39.79 | |
| Labour | Roy Edward Boffy | 185 | 8.20 | |
| Labour | David John Morris | 183 | 8.11 | |
| Majority | | 713 | 31.59 | |
| Turnout | | 2257 | 49.5 | |
| Conservative **hold** | | Swing | | |
| Conservative **hold** | | Swing | | |

Longdon (1 seats)
| Party | Candidate | Votes | % | ±% |
|---|---|---|---|---|
| Conservative | **Neil Roberts*** | | | |
| Conservative **hold** | | Swing | | |

This poll was uncontested

| Party | Candidate | Votes | % | ±% |
|---|---|---|---|---|
| Labour | | | | |
| Conservative | | | | |
| Liberal Democrats | | | | |
| Majority | | | | |
| Turnout | | | | |
| Labour **hold** | | Swing | | |

{{{title}}}
| Party | Candidate | Votes | % | ±% |
|---|---|---|---|---|
| Labour | | | | |
| Conservative | | | | |
| Liberal Democrats | | | | |
| Majority | | | | |
| Turnout | | | | |
| Labour **hold** | | Swing | | |

{{{title}}}
| Party | Candidate | Votes | % | ±% |
|---|---|---|---|---|
| Labour | | | | |
| Conservative | | | | |
| Liberal Democrats | | | | |
| Majority | | | | |
| Turnout | | | | |
| Labour **hold** | | Swing | | |

{{{title}}}
| Party | Candidate | Votes | % | ±% |
|---|---|---|---|---|
| Labour | | | | |
| Conservative | | | | |
| Liberal Democrats | | | | |
| Majority | | | | |
| Turnout | | | | |
| Labour **hold** | | Swing | | |

{{{title}}}
| Party | Candidate | Votes | % | ±% |
|---|---|---|---|---|
| Labour | | | | |
| Conservative | | | | |
| Liberal Democrats | | | | |
| Majority | | | | |
| Turnout | | | | |
| Labour **hold** | | Swing | | |

{{{title}}}
| Party | Candidate | Votes | % | ±% |
|---|---|---|---|---|
| Labour | | | | |
| Conservative | | | | |
| Liberal Democrats | | | | |
| Majority | | | | |
| Turnout | | | | |
| Labour **hold** | | Swing | | |

{{{title}}}
| Party | Candidate | Votes | % | ±% |
|---|---|---|---|---|
| Labour | | | | |
| Conservative | | | | |
| Liberal Democrats | | | | |
| Majority | | | | |
| Turnout | | | | |
| Labour **hold** | | Swing | | |

{{{title}}}
| Party | Candidate | Votes | % | ±% |
|---|---|---|---|---|
| Labour | | | | |
| Conservative | | | | |
| Liberal Democrats | | | | |
| Majority | | | | |
| Turnout | | | | |
| Labour **hold** | | Swing | | |

{{{title}}}
| Party | Candidate | Votes | % | ±% |
|---|---|---|---|---|
| Labour | | | | |
| Conservative | | | | |
| Liberal Democrats | | | | |
| Majority | | | | |
| Turnout | | | | |
| Labour **hold** | | Swing | | |

{{{title}}}
| Party | Candidate | Votes | % | ±% |
|---|---|---|---|---|
| Labour | | | | |
| Conservative | | | | |
| Liberal Democrats | | | | |
| Majority | | | | |
| Turnout | | | | |
| Labour **hold** | | Swing | | |

{{{title}}}
| Party | Candidate | Votes | % | ±% |
|---|---|---|---|---|
| Labour | | | | |
| Conservative | | | | |
| Liberal Democrats | | | | |
| Majority | | | | |
| Turnout | | | | |
| Labour **hold** | | Swing | | |

{{{title}}}
| Party | Candidate | Votes | % | ±% |
|---|---|---|---|---|
| Labour | | | | |
| Conservative | | | | |
| Liberal Democrats | | | | |
| Majority | | | | |
| Turnout | | | | |
| Labour **hold** | | Swing | | |

{{{title}}}
| Party | Candidate | Votes | % | ±% |
|---|---|---|---|---|
| Labour | | | | |
| Conservative | | | | |
| Liberal Democrats | | | | |
| Majority | | | | |
| Turnout | | | | |
| Labour **hold** | | Swing | | |

{{{title}}}
| Party | Candidate | Votes | % | ±% |
|---|---|---|---|---|
| Labour | | | | |
| Conservative | | | | |
| Liberal Democrats | | | | |
| Majority | | | | |
| Turnout | | | | |
| Labour **hold** | | Swing | | |

{{{title}}}
| Party | Candidate | Votes | % | ±% |
|---|---|---|---|---|
| Labour | | | | |
| Conservative | | | | |
| Liberal Democrats | | | | |
| Majority | | | | |
| Turnout | | | | |
| Labour **hold** | | Swing | | |
