= Chesterfield, Staffordshire =

Hamlet in Staffordshire, England

Coordinates: 52.642667°N 1.868427°W

Chesterfield
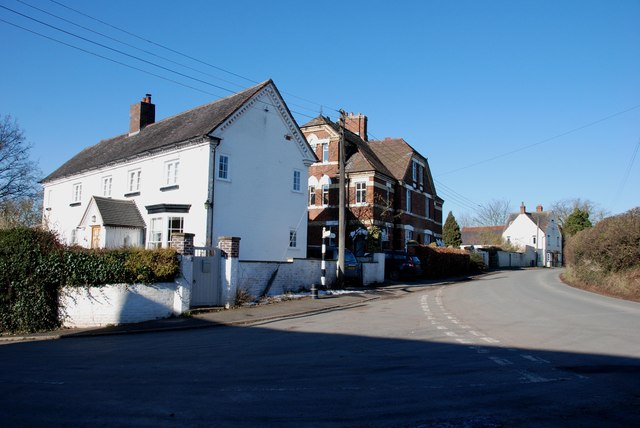
- Houses in Chesterfield

- Location within Staffordshire
- Population: 800
- OS grid reference: SK10120573
- Civil parish: Wall
- District: Lichfield
- Shire county: Staffordshire
- Region: West Midlands
- Country: England
- Sovereign state: United Kingdom
- Post town: Walsall
- Postcode district: WS14
- UK Parliament: Tamworth

Chesterfield is a hamlet in the civil parish of Wall, in the Lichfield district, in the county of Staffordshire, England.

Chesterfield has a population of around 800. It is policed by Staffordshire Police. It is located within the Tamworth Parliamentary Constituency.

Chesterfield is northwest of the village of Shenstone and southeast of the city of Lichfield. It is close to the M6 motorway toll road just to the north.

In 1870–72, the hamlet had a population of 133.
