= 2015 Lichfield District Council election =

2015 UK local government election

Map of the results by ward

The 2015 Lichfield District Council election took place on 7 May 2015 to elect members of the Lichfield District Council in England. It was held on the same day as other local elections.

== Election result ==
The Conservatives maintained control of the council.

Lichfield local election result 2015
Party	Seats	Gains	Losses	Net gain/loss	Seats %	Votes %	Votes	+/−
Conservative	41					54.6	27,330	
Labour	4					26.8	13,415	
UKIP	1					8.5	4,256	
Liberal Democrats	1					4.7	2,364	
Independent	0					3.8	1,882	
Green	0					1.7	832	
