= Fisherwick =

- Civil parish
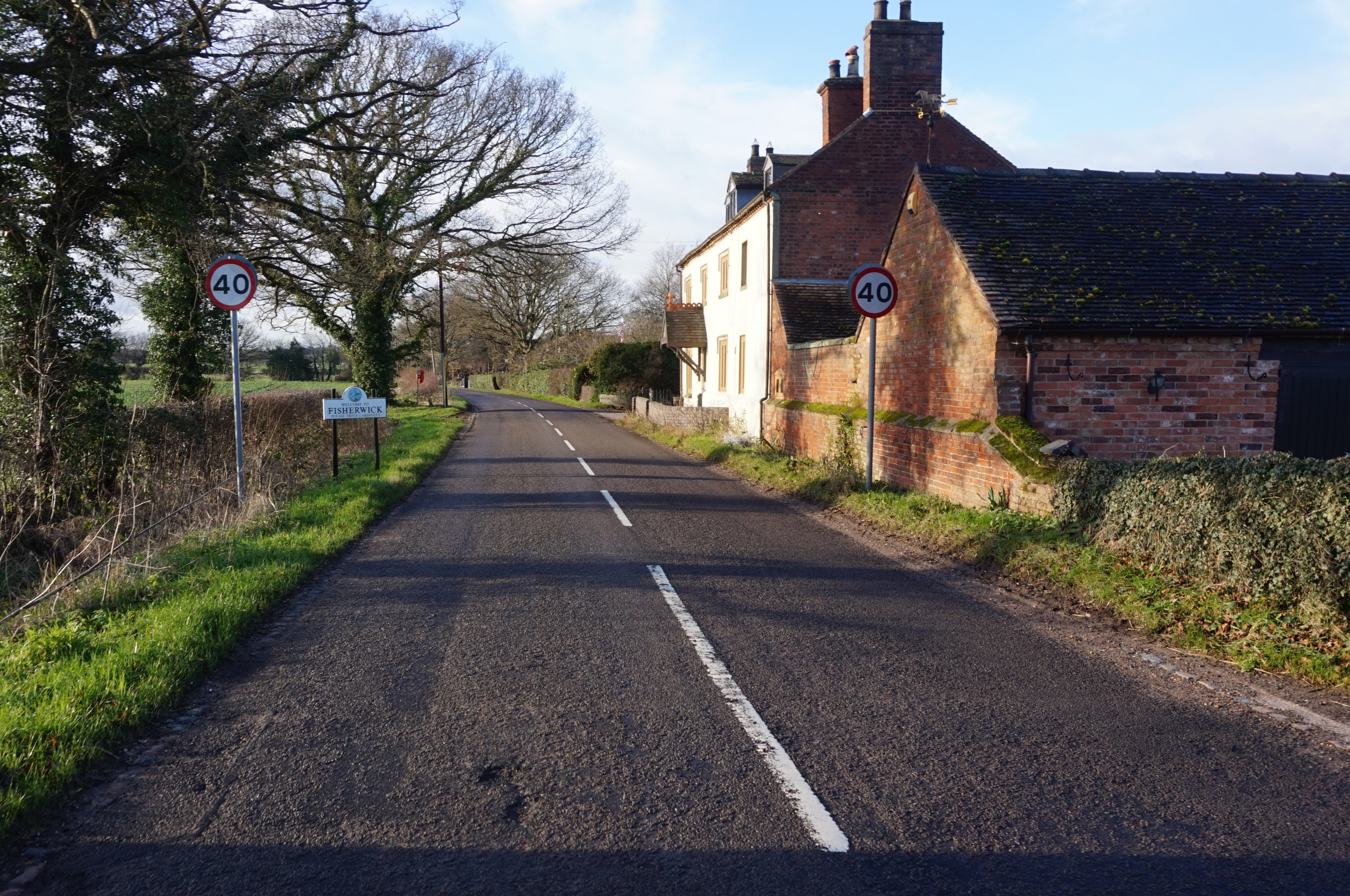
- Interactive map of Fisherwick
- Coordinates: 52°40′N 1°44′W
- Country: England
- Primary council: Lichfield
- County: Staffordshire
- Region: West Midlands
- Status: Parish

Government
  - Type: Parish Council, with Whittington
  - UK Parliament: Lichfield

Population (2001)
  - Total: 211
- Website: Parish Council

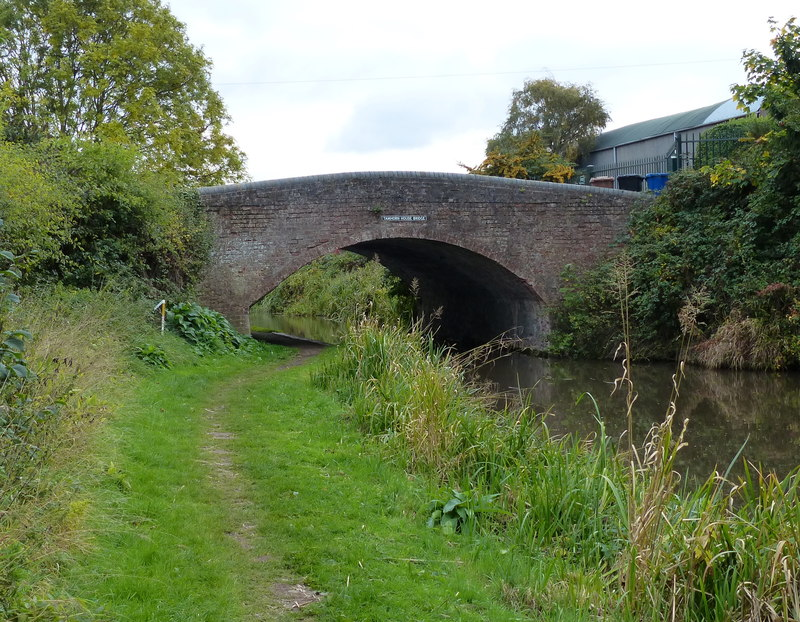
Tamhorn House Bridge

Fisherwick is a civil parish in the Lichfield district, Staffordshire, England. Located about 4 miles (6 km) east of the City of Lichfield, the parish does not include a village, just a scattered collection of farms and houses. The ancient settlement, dating back to the 12th century, and the manor of Fisherwick Park no longer exist. The parish council is a joint one with Whittington. At the 2021 census the population of the parish was 201.

Adjacent to the Fisherwick settlement is the hamlet of Hademore, which is divided by the West Coast Main Line via Tamworth, and is next to the Coventry Canal. The level crossing over the WCML at Hademore was replaced by a bridge at Christmas 2006.

The River Tame forms the eastern and northern boundary of the parish as it flows northwards.

== See also ==
- Listed buildings in Fisherwick
- Baron Fisherwick
