= 2019 Lichfield District Council election =

2019 UK local government election

- 2 May 2019

All 47 seats to Lichfield District Council 24 seats needed for a majority

	First party	Second party
Party	Conservative	Labour
Last election	42 seats, 54.6%	4 seats, 26.8%
Seats won	34	10
Seat change	▼8	▲6
Popular vote	20,120	11,606
Percentage	49.0%	28.3%
Swing	▼5.6%	▲1.5%
	Third party	Fourth party
Party	Independent	Liberal Democrats
Last election	0 seats, 3.8%	1 seat, 4.7%
Seats won	2	1
Seat change	▲2	Steady
Popular vote	1,643	5,605
Percentage	4.0%	13.7%
Swing	▲0.2%	▲9.0%
- Map of the results by ward
Council control before election
Conservative
Council control after election
Conservative

The 2019 Lichfield District Council election took place on 2 May to elect members of Lichfield District Council in Staffordshire, England. The whole council - 47 members - was up for election and the Conservative Party retained overall control of the council.

== Campaign ==
Labour, Conservative, Liberal Democrats, Independent, UKIP and Green Party candidates stood in the election. Between one and three members of the council were elected from each ward, depending on the electorate's size.

== Summary ==
=== Election result ===
The Conservatives maintained control of the council.

2019 Lichfield District Council election
Party	Candidates	Seats	Gains	Losses	Net gain/loss	Seats %	Votes %	Votes	+/−
Conservative	46	34	0	8	▼8	72.3	49.0	20,120	–5.6
Labour	33	10	6	0	▲6	21.3	28.3	11,606	+1.5
Independent	4	2	2	0	▲2	4.3	4.0	1,643	+0.2
Liberal Democrats	16	1	0	0	Steady	2.1	13.7	5,605	+9.0
UKIP	4	0	0	0	Steady	0.0	2.6	1,052	–5.9
Green	4	0	0	0	Steady	0.0	2.5	1,025	+0.8

== Results by ward ==
Elected candidates in bold.

Alrewas and Fradley (3 seats)
Party	Candidate	Votes	%	±%
**Conservative**	**Derick George Cross**	**843**	**63.3**	
**Conservative**	**Michael John Wilcox**	**790**	**59.3**	
**Conservative**	**Sonia Elizabeth Wilcox**	**748**	**56.2**	
Labour	Alison Claire Wright	442	33.2	
Labour	David Alan Cullen	325	24.4	
Majority		306	9.72	
Rejected ballots		57	4.1	
Turnout		1,389	28	
Registered electors		4,880		

Armitage with Handsacre (3 seats)
Party	Candidate	Votes	%	±%
**Conservative**	**Richard Ernest Cox**	**850**	**58.0**	
**Conservative**	**Tom Marshall**	**799**	**54.5**	
**Conservative**	**Nicholas David Binney**	**663**	**45.3**	
Labour	Lindsey Teresa Baker	508	34.7	
Independent	Steve Hyden	457	31.2	
Majority		155	4.73	
Rejected ballots		28	1.88	
Turnout		1,493	24	
Registered electors		6,109		

Boley Park (2 seats)
Party	Candidate	Votes	%	±%
**Conservative**	**Janet May Eagland**	**697**	**54.6**	
**Conservative**	**Mark Andrew Warfield**	**639**	**50.1**	
Liberal Democrats	Linda Dickins	470	36.8	
Liberal Democrats	Christine Ann Rapley	361	28.3	
Labour	Veran-Elise Palmer	271	21.2	
Majority		169	6.93	
Rejected ballots		36	2.74	
Turnout		1,312	38	
Registered electors		3,454		

Boney Hay and Central (3 seats)
Party	Candidate	Votes	%	±%
**Labour**	**Di Evans**	**583**	**49.2**	
**Labour**	**Rob Birch**	**569**	**48.0**	
**Labour**	**Brad Westwood**	**510**	**43.0**	
Conservative	Keith Andrew Willis-Croft	491	41.4	
Conservative	Robin Place	464	39.2	
Conservative	Thomas Neil Teko Pita Loughbrough Heron	400	33.8	
Majority		19	0.63	
Rejected ballots		64	5.12	
Turnout		1,249	24	
Registered electors		5,131		

Bourne Vale (1 seat)
Party	Candidate	Votes	%	±%
**Conservative**	**Brian William Yeates**	**no contest**		

Chadsmead (2 seats)
Party	Candidate	Votes	%	±%
**Liberal Democrats**	**Paul Ray**	**461**	**41.6**	
**Independent**	**Joanne Kay Grange**	**350**	**31.6**	
Liberal Democrats	Miles Trent	343	31.0	
Conservative	Muriel Gwyneth Boyle	203	18.3	
Conservative	Sara Pritchard	190	17.2	
Labour	Philip Sutcliffe	182	16.4	
Labour	Mark Neil Taylor	176	15.9	
UKIP	Kevin Casserley	156	14.1	
Majority		7	0.34	
Rejected ballots		5	0.45	
Turnout		1,112	33	
Registered electors		3,372		

Chase Terrace (2 seats)
Party	Candidate	Votes	%	±%
**Labour**	**Steven Gerald Norman**	**505**	**58.4**	
**Labour**	**Sharon Wyn Banevicius**	**492**	**56.9**	
Conservative	Brian Frederick Bacon	322	37.2	
Conservative	Norma Bacon	319	36.9	
Majority		170	10.38	
Rejected ballots		42	4.63	
Turnout		907	24	
Registered electors		3,768		

Chasetown (2 seats)
Party	Candidate	Votes	%	±%
**Labour**	**Darren Michael Oliver Ennis**	**391**	**59.2**	
**Conservative**	**Samuel John Tapper**	**282**	**42.7**	
Labour	Carolyn Harriet Gittings	279	42.2	
Majority		109	11.45	
Rejected ballots		34	4.89	
Turnout		695	21	
Registered electors		3,278		

Colton and the Ridwares (1 seat)
Party	Candidate	Votes	%	±%
**Conservative**	**Shirley Ann Barnett**	**432**	**73.6**	
Labour	Colin George Noble	155	26.4	
Majority		277	47.19	
Rejected ballots		30	4.86	
Turnout		617	33	
Registered electors		1,896		

Curborough (2 seats)
Party	Candidate	Votes	%	±%
**Labour**	**Colin John Ball**	**339**	**43.3**	
**Labour**	**Dave Robertson**	**280**	**35.8**	
Conservative	Daniel Floyd	244	31.2	
Conservative	Susan Elizabeth Smith	197	25.2	
Green	Diane Rosemary Harrison	160	20.4	
Liberal Democrats	Anne Margaret Johnson Pitman	133	17.0	
Liberal Democrats	Christopher James Cadwallader-Allan	99	12.6	
Majority		36	2.48	
Rejected ballots		32	3.93	
Turnout		815	24	
Registered electors		3,352		

Fazeley (2 seats)
Party	Candidate	Votes	%	±%
**Conservative**	**James Andrew Parton-Hughes**	**368**	**41.5**	
**Conservative**	**Barry John Gwilt**	**306**	**34.5**	
Labour	Kathryn Dawn Dwyer	299	33.7	
UKIP	Janet Maureen Higgins	284	32.1	
Labour	Jenny Sadler	275	31.0	
Majority		7	0.46	
Rejected ballots		5	0.56	
Turnout		891	25	
Registered electors		3,554		

Hammerwich with Wall (2 seats)
Party	Candidate	Votes	%	±%
**Conservative**	**Janice Silvester-Hall**	**696**	**67.1**	
**Conservative**	**Alastair Matthew Little**	**529**	**51.0**	
Labour	Andrew James Wilred Bullock	322	31.1	
Labour	Jamie Lee Denton	314	30.3	
Majority		207	11.12	
Rejected ballots		56	5.12	
Turnout		1,093	31	
Registered electors		3,477		

Highfield (2 seats)
Party	Candidate	Votes	%	±%
**Conservative**	**Douglas Robert Pullen**	**578**	**55.7**	
**Conservative**	**Wai-Lee Ho**	**533**	**51.4**	
Labour	Jane Elizabeth Smith	384	37.0	
Labour	Elaine Denise Kirkham	331	31.9	
Majority		149	8.16	
Rejected ballots		61	5.56	
Turnout		1,098	29	
Registered electors		3,756		

Leomansley (3 seats)
Party	Candidate	Votes	%	±%
**Conservative**	**Jamie Checkland**	**790**	**43.9**	
**Conservative**	**Iain Morris Eadie**	**776**	**43.1**	
**Conservative**	**Andy Smith**	**743**	**41.3**	
Liberal Democrats	Jamie Christie	528	29.3	
Liberal Democrats	Ian Andrew Jackson	518	28.8	
Liberal Democrats	Lee Mark Cadwallader-Allan	429	23.8	
Green	Paul Ecclestone-Brown	360	20.0	
Labour	Rajesh Krishna Kulkarni	307	17.1	
Labour	Kim Sheree Heidi Rochelle	291	16.2	
Labour	Paul Anthony Golder	285	15.8	
Majority		215	4.28	
Rejected ballots		32	1.75	
Turnout		1,831	35	
Registered electors		5,270		

Little Aston and Stonnall (2 seats)
Party	Candidate	Votes	%	±%
**Conservative**	**Elizabeth Alice Little**	**no contest**		
**Conservative**	**Joseph John Rayner Powell**	**no contest**		

Longdon (1 seat)
Party	Candidate	Votes	%	±%
**Conservative**	**Robert William Strachan**	**no contest**		

Mease Valley (1 seat)
Party	Candidate	Votes	%	±%
**Conservative**	**Ashley Yeates**	**293**	**54.2**	
Liberal Democrats	Roger Phillip Bennion	248	45.8	
Majority		45	8.32	
Rejected ballots		15	2.7	
Turnout		556	36	
Registered electors		1,562		

Shenstone (1 seat)
Party	Candidate	Votes	%	±%
**Conservative**	**David Frank Salter**	**374**	**54.0**	
Green	Stuart Alan Jones	176	25.4	
Labour	David Stephen Thompson	142	20.5	
Majority		198	28.61	
Rejected ballots		9	1.28	
Turnout		704	36	
Registered electors		1,976		

St John's (3 seats)
Party	Candidate	Votes	%	±%
**Conservative**	**Deb Baker**	**629**	**44.4**	
**Conservative**	**Tim Matthews**	**613**	**43.3**	
**Conservative**	**Chris Spruce**	**558**	**39.4**	
Labour	Robyn St Clair Fawcett	342	24.2	
Labour	Benjamin Robert Watkins	333	23.5	
Green	Simon Charles Partridge	329	23.2	
Liberal Democrats	Hugh Thomas Ashton	311	22.0	
Liberal Democrats	John Anthony Smith	304	21.5	
Labour	Don Palmer	296	20.9	
Liberal Democrats	Paul Anthony Yeo	290	20.5	
Majority		216	5.39	
Rejected ballots		35	2.41	
Turnout		1,451	31	
Registered electors		4,610		

Stowe (3 seats)
Party	Candidate	Votes	%	±%
**Conservative**	**Angela Clare Lax**	**567**	**35.2**	
**Conservative**	**Colin Greatorex**	**561**	**34.9**	
**Independent**	**Jeyan Anketell**	**551**	**34.2**	
Conservative	Jon O'Hagan	455	28.3	
Liberal Democrats	Richard John Rathbone	406	25.2	
Liberal Democrats	Paul McDermott	381	23.7	
Labour	Matthew Lee Field	374	23.2	
Liberal Democrats	Alasdair Mark Brooks	323	20.1	
Independent	Christopher James Wilkinson	285	17.7	
UKIP	Alan Schofield	255	15.8	
Majority		96	2.31	
Rejected ballots		25	1.53	
Turnout		1,634	33	
Registered electors		5,000		

Summerfield and All Saints (3 seats)
Party	Candidate	Votes	%	±%
**Labour**	**Bernard John Brown**	**493**	**41.4**	
**Labour**	**Laura Jane Ennis**	**492**	**41.4**	
**Conservative**	**Ken Humphreys**	**470**	**39.5**	
Conservative	Heather Tranter	382	32.1	
UKIP	John Stewart Hitchin	357	30.0	
Conservative	Natasha Inez Pullen	326	27.4	
Labour	Roy Frederick Tovey	319	26.8	
Majority		88	3.1	
Rejected ballots		26	2.14	
Turnout		1,215	25	
Registered electors		4,916		

Whittington and Streethay (3 seats)
Party	Candidate	Votes	%	±%
**Conservative**	**David John Leytham**	**no contest**		
**Conservative**	**Harry Albert Warburton**	**no contest**		
**Conservative**	**Alan George White**	**no contest**		

== Changes 2019–2023 ==
- Jeyan Anketell, elected for Stowe as an independent, joined the Labour Party in 2020.
- Alastair Little, elected for Hammerwich with Wall as a Conservative, left the party in January 2022 over its handling of allegations of lockdown-breaching gatherings in Downing Street, and continued to sit as an independent.
- James Parton-Hughes, elected for Fazeley as a Conservative, was disqualified as a councillor on 12 January 2023 under section 85 of the Local Government Act 1972 for non-attendance at meetings, citing bereavement, medical issues and the COVID-19 pandemic; the seat remained vacant for the rest of the term.
- Barry Gwilt, elected for Fazeley as a Conservative, defected to Reform UK in January 2023, having been deselected as the Conservative candidate for the 2023 election.
- Elizabeth "Liz" Little, elected for Little Aston and Stonnall as a Conservative, was suspended by the party in March 2023 after criticising her deselection as the Conservative candidate for the 2023 election, and continued to sit as an independent.

=== By-elections ===
==== Summerfield and All Saints ====
Summerfield and All Saints by-election: 6 May 2021
Party	Candidate	Votes	%	±%
Conservative	Heather Tranter	783	57.3	
Labour	Michael Galvin	392	28.7	
Liberal Democrats	John Taylor	191	14.0	
Majority		391	28.63	
Rejected ballots		16	1.16	
Turnout		1,382	28	
Registered electors		4,868		
Conservative gain from Labour		Swing		

The by-election was triggered by the resignation of the sitting Labour councillor, Bernard Brown, in July 2020, as council meetings were being held exclusively online due to the COVID-19 pandemic, and he was unable to attend as he did not have access to the Internet.

==== Armitage with Handsacre ====
Armitage with Handsacre by-election: 16 December 2021
Party	Candidate	Votes	%	±%
Conservative	Richard Cross	458	60.3	−2.2
Labour	Mark Pritchard	301	39.7	+2.2
Majority		157	20.6	
Rejected ballots		5	0.65	
Turnout		764	12.6	
Registered electors		6,051		
Conservative hold		Swing	▼2.2	

The by-election was triggered by the resignation of the sitting Conservative councillor, Nick Binney, who stepped down after moving out of the area.

==== Chasetown ====
Chasetown by-election: 3 November 2022
Party	Candidate	Votes	%	±%
Labour	Paul Taylor	318	73.3	
Conservative	Norma Bacon	116	26.7	
Majority		202	46.5	
Turnout		434		
Labour gain from Conservative		Swing		

The by-election was triggered by the resignation of the sitting Conservative councillor, Samuel Tapper, earlier in 2022.
