= 2023 Lichfield District Council election =

- 4 May 2023

All 47 seats to Lichfield District Council 24 seats needed for a majority
- Turnout: 30.2%

	First party	Second party	Third party
Leader	Doug Pullen	Steven Norman	Paul Ray
Party	Conservative	Labour	Liberal Democrats
Last election	34 seats, 49.0%	10 seats, 28.3%	1 seat, 13.7%
Seats before	31 (Note: Including one vacant seat in Fazeley ward previously held by Conservative councillor James Parton-Hughes until his removal from the council for non-attendance in January 2023.)	11	1
Seats won	23	17	7
Seat change	▼11	▲7	▲6
Popular vote	23,652	20,344	6,476
Percentage	44.6%	38.3%	12.2%
Swing	▼4.4%	▲10.0%	▼1.5%
	Fourth party	Fifth party
Party	Independent	Reform
Last election	2 seats, 4.0%	N/A
Seats before	3	1
Seats won	0	0
Seat change	▼2	Steady
Popular vote	1,242	N/A
Percentage	2.3%	N/A
Swing	▼1.7%	N/A
- Winner of each seat at the 2023 Lichfield District Council election
Leader before election
Doug Pullen
Conservative
Leader after election
Doug Pullen
Conservative
No overall control

The 2023 Lichfield District Council election took place on 4 May 2023 to elect members of Lichfield District Council in Staffordshire, England. This was on the same day as other English local elections.

All 47 members of the council were up for election, and the Conservatives lost control of the council to no overall control. This marked the first time that the Conservatives had not held Lichfield District Council since 1999. The Conservatives managed to form a minority administration after the election as Labour and the Liberal Democrats ruled out a coalition.

== Summary ==
=== Candidates ===
Labour, Conservative, Liberal Democrats, Independent and Green Party candidates stood in the election. Between one and three members of the council were elected from each ward, depending on the electorate's size. UKIP and Reform UK did not stand, despite the latter holding a councillor following a defection from the Conservatives.

=== Election result ===
2023 Lichfield District Council election
Party	Candidates	Seats	Gains	Losses	Net gain/loss	Seats %	Votes %	Votes	+/−
Conservative	47	23	4	11	▼7	49.0	44.6	23,652	–4.4
Labour	39	17	6	0	▲6	36.2	38.3	20,344	+10.0
Liberal Democrats	12	7	6	0	▲6	14.9	12.2	6,476	–1.5
Green	3	0	0	0	0	0.0	2.5	1,341	±0.0
Independent	5	0	0	3	▼3	0.0	2.3	1,242	–1.7
Reform	0	0	0	1	▼1	0.0	0.0	0	N/A

== Ward results ==
=== Alrewas and Fradley ===
Alrewas and Fradley (3 seats)
Party	Candidate	Votes	%	±%
Conservative	Mike Wilcox*	748	47.6	–11.7
Conservative	Sonia Wilcox*	695	44.3	–11.9
Conservative	Derick Cross*	682	43.4	–19.9
Labour	Tobias Ryder	640	40.8	+7.6
Labour	David Whatton	621	39.6	+15.2
Labour	Ian Coxon	502	32.0	N/A
Liberal Democrats	Alasdair Brooks	332	21.1	N/A
Turnout		1,570	28.6	
Registered electors		5,488		
Conservative hold				
Conservative hold				
Conservative hold				

=== Armitage and Handsacre ===
Armitage with Handsacre (3 seats)
Party	Candidate	Votes	%	±%
Conservative	Richard Cox*	823	57.9	–0.1
Conservative	Thomas Marshall*	749	52.7	–1.8
Conservative	Nikki Hawkins	665	46.8	+1.5
Labour	Jacob Marshall	512	36.0	+1.3
Labour	Marvin Shortman	478	33.6	N/A
Labour	Christopher Willis	469	33.0	N/A
Liberal Democrats	Morwenna Rae	220	15.5	N/A
Turnout		1,422	23.8	
Registered electors		5,967		
Conservative hold				
Conservative hold				
Conservative hold				

=== Boley Park ===
Boley Park (2 seats)
Party	Candidate	Votes	%	±%
Conservative	Douglas Pullen*	678	46.4	–8.2
Conservative	Mark Warfield*	660	45.2	–4.9
Labour	Andrew Fox	528	36.2	+15.0
Liberal Democrats	Scott Hollingsworth	428	29.3	–7.5
Labour	Raj Kulkarni	425	29.1	N/A
Turnout		1,460	43.8	
Registered electors		3,330		
Conservative hold				
Conservative hold				

=== Boney Hay and Central ===
Boney Hay and Central (3 seats)
Party	Candidate	Votes	%	±%
Labour	Di Evans*	731	59.5	+10.3
Labour	Paul Taylor	686	55.8	+7.8
Labour	Sharon Taylor	664	54.0	+11.0
Conservative	James Craik	452	36.8	–4.6
Conservative	Steven Swain	414	33.7	–5.5
Conservative	Keith Willis-Croft	413	33.6	–0.2
Turnout		1,229	25.0	
Registered electors		4,910		
Labour hold				
Labour hold				
Labour hold				

=== Bourne Vale ===
Bourne Vale
Party	Candidate	Votes	%	±%
Conservative	Brian Yeates*	Unopposed		
Registered electors		?		
Conservative hold				

=== Chadsmead ===
Chadsmead (2 seats)
Party	Candidate	Votes	%	±%
Liberal Democrats	Paul Ray*	545	49.9	+8.3
Liberal Democrats	Miles Trent	432	39.5	+8.5
Independent	Joanne Grange*	384	35.1	+3.5
Conservative	Elaine Hutchings	327	29.9	+11.6
Conservative	Paul Jones	218	19.9	+2.7
Turnout		1,093	34.4	
Registered electors		3,182		
Liberal Democrats hold				
Liberal Democrats gain from Independent				

=== Chase Terrace ===
Chase Terrace (2 seats)
Party	Candidate	Votes	%	±%
Labour	Sue Woodward	577	72.3	+15.4
Labour	Steven Norman*	532	66.7	+8.3
Conservative	Richard Cross*	192	24.1	–13.1
Conservative	Matt Warburton	176	22.1	–14.8
Turnout		798	22.2	
Registered electors		3,592		
Labour hold				
Labour hold				

=== Chasetown ===
Chasetown (2 seats)
Party	Candidate	Votes	%	±%
Labour	Darren Ennis*	507	71.6	+12.4
Labour	Laura Ennis*	467	66.0	+23.8
Conservative	Norma Bacon	197	27.8	–14.9
Conservative	Antony Jones	149	21.0	N/A
Turnout		708	20.3	
Registered electors		3,488		
Labour hold				
Labour gain from Conservative				

=== Colton and the Ridwares ===
Colton and the Ridwares
Party	Candidate	Votes	%	±%
Conservative	Keith Vernon	317	52.5	–21.0
Labour	Paul Golder	161	26.7	+0.3
Green	David Cullen	125	20.7	N/A
Majority		156	25.8	
Turnout		608	33.5	
Registered electors		1,817		
Conservative hold				

=== Curborough ===
Curborough (2 seats)
Party	Candidate	Votes	%	±%
Labour	Dave Robertson*	516	61.6	+25.8
Labour	Colin Ball*	509	60.8	+17.5
Conservative	Daniel Floyd	282	33.7	+2.5
Conservative	Edward Sheasby	258	30.8	+5.6
Turnout		837	25.8	
Registered electors		3,239		
Labour hold				
Labour hold				

=== Fazeley ===
Fazeley (2 seats)
Party	Candidate	Votes	%	±%
Conservative	Alex Farrell	526	59.8	+18.3
Conservative	John Hill	519	59.0	+24.5
Labour	Anne Thompson	336	38.2	+4.5
Labour	David Thompson	309	35.1	+4.1
Turnout		880	25.8	
Registered electors		3,411		
Conservative hold				
Conservative gain from Reform				

=== Hammerwich with Wall ===
Hammerwich with Wall (2 seats)
Party	Candidate	Votes	%	±%
Conservative	Janice Silvester-Hall*	509	52.3	–14.8
Conservative	Wing Heng Leung	489	50.2	–0.8
Labour	Carolyn Gittings	447	45.9	+14.8
Labour	Lorna McGinty	374	38.4	+8.1
Turnout		974	28.8	
Registered electors		3,385		
Conservative hold				
Conservative gain from Independent				

=== Highfield ===
Highfield (2 seats)
Party	Candidate	Votes	%	±%
Conservative	Wai-Lee Ho*	602	56.7	+5.3
Conservative	Serena Mears	538	50.7	–5.0
Labour	Robyn Ennis	428	40.3	+3.3
Labour	Jane Smith	353	33.3	+1.4
Turnout		1,061	29.1	
Registered electors		3,653		
Conservative hold				
Conservative hold				

=== Leomansley ===
Leomansley (3 seats)
Party	Candidate	Votes	%	±%
Liberal Democrats	Richard Henshaw	734	35.5	+6.2
Conservative	Jamie Checkland*	731	35.4	–8.5
Conservative	Andy Smith*	718	34.7	–6.6
Labour	James Blackman	716	34.6	+17.5
Liberal Democrats	Jamie Christie	711	34.4	+5.6
Conservative	Sally Gilbert	696	33.7	–9.4
Labour	Ben Watkins	669	32.4	+16.2
Green	Paul Ecclestone-Brown	642	31.1	+11.1
Turnout		2,067	38.2	
Registered electors		5,417		
Liberal Democrats gain from Conservative				
Conservative hold				
Conservative hold				

=== Little Aston & Stonnall ===
Little Aston & Stonnall (2 seats)
Party	Candidate	Votes	%	±%
Conservative	Philip Whitehouse	705	59.7	N/A
Conservative	Joseph Powell*	701	59.4	N/A
Independent	Ruth Graham	315	26.7	N/A
Independent	Elizabeth Little*	277	23.5	N/A
Labour	Stuart Harrison	250	21.2	N/A
Turnout		1,181	30.8	N/A
Registered electors		3,829		
Conservative hold				
Conservative gain from Independent				

=== Longdon ===
Longdon
Party	Candidate	Votes	%	±%
Conservative	Robert Strachan*	384	70.5	N/A
Labour	Catherine Wood	161	29.5	N/A
Majority		223	41.0	N/A
Turnout		555	33.5	N/A
Registered electors		1,659		
Conservative hold				

=== Mease Valley ===
Mease Valley
Party	Candidate	Votes	%	±%
Liberal Democrats	Phil Bennion	318	56.3	+10.5
Conservative	Ashley Yeates*	247	43.7	–10.5
Majority		71	12.6	N/A
Turnout		569	36.2	
Registered electors		1,572		
Liberal Democrats gain from Conservative				

=== Shenstone ===
Shenstone
Party	Candidate	Votes	%	±%
Conservative	David Salter*	443	69.1	+15.1
Labour	Matthew Field	198	30.9	+10.4
Majority		245	38.2	
Turnout		646	34.0	
Registered electors		1,898		
Conservative hold				

=== St John's ===
St John's (3 seats)
Party	Candidate	Votes	%	±%
Labour	Rosemary Harvey-Coggins	781	44.8	+20.6
Labour	Jeyan Anketell*	747	42.9	+19.4
Liberal Democrats	John Smith	678	38.9	+16.9
Conservative	Deb Baker*	617	35.4	–9.0
Conservative	Colin Greatorex*	575	33.0	–10.3
Green	Simon Partridge	574	33.0	+9.8
Conservative	Tim Matthews	545	31.3	–8.1
Independent	John Madden	79	4.5	N/A
Turnout		1,742	35.8	
Registered electors		4,860		
Labour gain from Conservative				
Labour gain from Conservative				
Liberal Democrats gain from Conservative				

=== Stowe ===
Stowe (3 seats)
Party	Candidate	Votes	%	±%
Labour	Ann Hughes	758	43.2	+20.0
Labour	Russ Bragger	740	42.1	N/A
Liberal Democrats	Hugh Ashton	684	39.0	+13.8
Liberal Democrats	Paul McDermott	667	38.0	+14.3
Conservative	Angela Lax*	605	34.5	–0.7
Conservative	Marcus Simmons	527	30.0	–4.9
Conservative	Jon O'Hagan	472	26.9	–1.4
Turnout		1,756	36.2	
Registered electors		4,850		
Labour hold				
Labour gain from Conservative				
Liberal Democrats gain from Conservative				

=== Summerfield and All Saints ===
Summerfield and All Saints (3 seats)
Party	Candidate	Votes	%	±%
Labour	Kathy Coe	574	50.8	+9.4
Labour	Sharon Banevicius	528	46.7	+5.3
Labour	Michael Galvin	528	46.7	+19.9
Conservative	Heather Tranter*	477	42.2	+2.7
Conservative	Richard Stephenson	392	34.7	+2.6
Conservative	Nicola Greensill	380	33.6	+6.2
Independent	Sammy Goody	187	16.5	N/A
Turnout		1,131	23.6	
Registered electors		4,798		
Labour hold				
Labour gain from Conservative				
Labour gain from Conservative				

=== Whittington and Streethay ===
Whittington and Streethay (3 seats)
Party	Candidate	Votes	%	±%
Conservative	Richard Holland	741	40.4	N/A
Labour	Claire Estelle Booker	733	39.9	N/A
Liberal Democrats	Andrew Rushton	727	39.6	N/A
Conservative	Alan White*	724	39.4	N/A
Conservative	Harry Warburton*	694	37.8	N/A
Labour	Jennifer Mackintosh	643	35.0	N/A
Labour	Mark Pritchard	546	29.7	N/A
Turnout		1,836	33.4	N/A
Registered electors		5,495		
Conservative hold				
Labour gain from Conservative				
Liberal Democrats gain from Conservative				

== Changes 2023–2027 ==
- Derick Cross and Serena Mears, both elected as Conservatives, left the party in October 2023 to sit as independents.
- Mike Wilcox, elected as a Conservative, subsequently left the party to sit as an independent before resigning in 2025.

=== By-elections ===
==== Alrewas & Fradley ====
Alrewas & Fradley by-election: 24 July 2025
Party	Candidate	Votes	%	±%
Conservative	Richard Stephenson	690	42.4	–1.1
Reform	Brandon Clark	439	27.0	N/A
Labour	Glen Bown	314	19.3	–17.9
Liberal Democrats	Morag Maclean	185	11.4	–7.9
Majority		251	15.4	N/A
Turnout		1,629	26.3	–2.3
Registered electors		6,197		
Conservative hold				

The by-election was triggered by the resignation of independent councillor Mike Wilcox, who had previously been elected as a Conservative.

==== Curborough ====
Curborough by-election: 1 May 2025
Party	Candidate	Votes	%	±%
Reform	Matthew Wallens	381	38.5	N/A
Conservative	Daniel Floyd	230	23.2	–12.1
Labour	Liz Stamatelatos	217	21.9	–42.8
Green	David Melhuish	92	9.3	N/A
Liberal Democrats	Paul McDermott	70	7.1	N/A
Majority		151	15.3	N/A
Turnout		992	30.2	+4.4
Registered electors		3,286		
Reform gain from Labour				

The by-election was triggered by the resignation of Labour councillor Dave Robertson after he was elected as the Member of Parliament for Lichfield.

==== Armitage & Handsacre ====
Armitage & Handsacre by-election: 11 December 2025
Party	Candidate	Votes	%	±%
Conservative	Martyn Punyer	630	46.7	−0.1
Reform	Andrew Clissett	431	31.9	N/A
Labour	James Blackman	127	9.4	−26.6
Liberal Democrats	Morag MacLean	99	7.3	−8.2
Green	David Cullen	63	4.7	N/A
Turnout		1,350	22.4	−1.4
Registered electors		6,020		
Conservative hold		Swing		

A by-election was called following the stepping down of Conservative councillor Nikki Hawkins.
