= St Mary's Church, Lichfield =

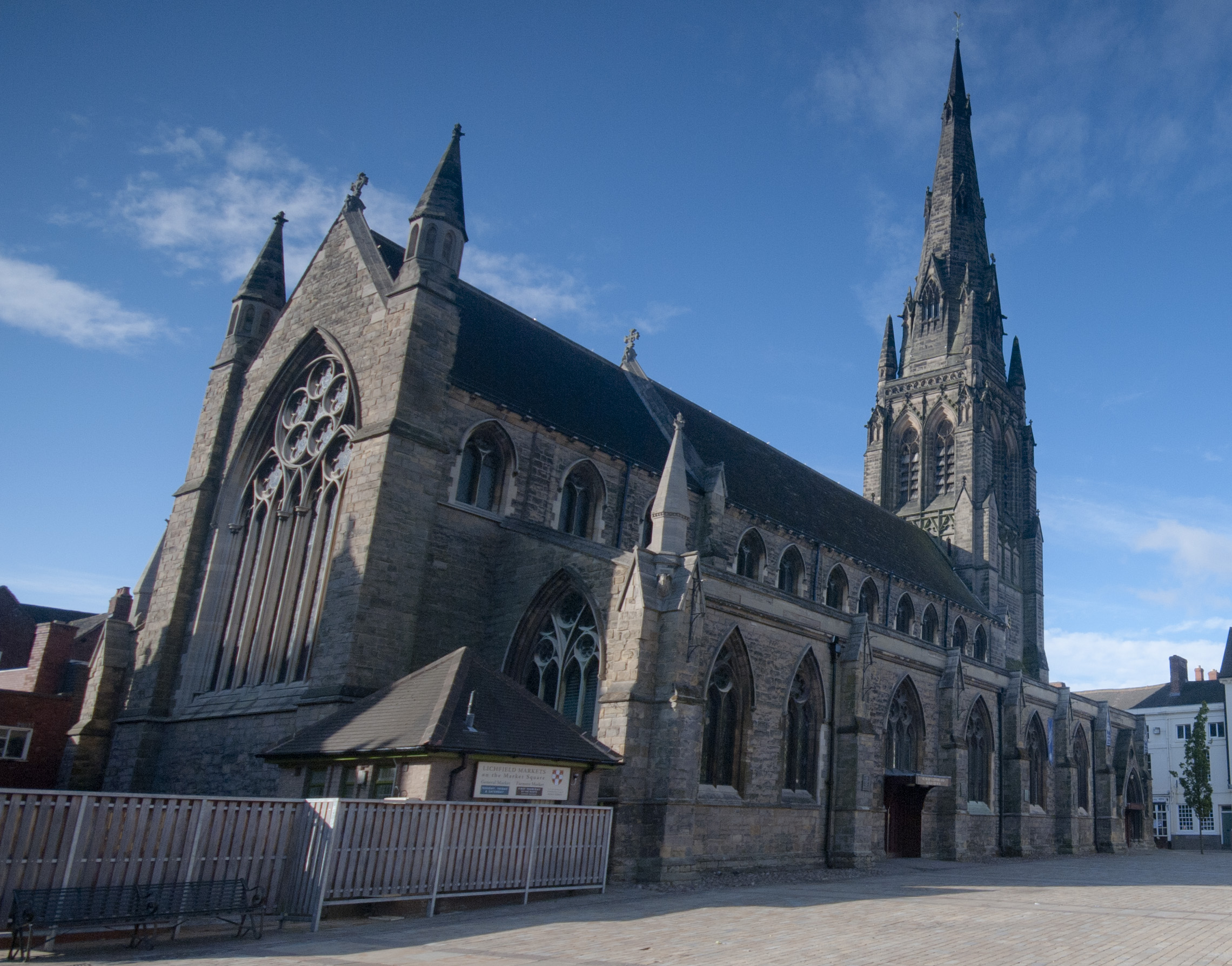
- St Mary's Church, Lichfield
- 52.683561°N 1.827403°W
- OS grid reference: SK 11761 09547
- Location: Lichfield, Staffordshire
- Country: England
- Denomination: Anglican

Architecture
- Functional status: Active
- Heritage designation: Grade II*
- Architect: James Fowler
- Style: Gothic Revival
- Completed: 1870

Specifications
- Materials: Rock-faced Derbyshire sandstone with ashlar dressings

Administration
- Province: Canterbury
- Diocese: Lichfield
- Parish: Lichfield

St Mary's Church is a city centre church in Lichfield, Staffordshire England located on the south side of the market square. A church is reputed to have been on the present site since at least 1150 but the current building dates from 1870 and is a Grade II* listed building. The church was remodelled in the early 1980s and again in 1997-1999 and now serves a variety of purposes including Lichfield Library and Tourist Information on the ground floor, and on the top floor, The Hub at St Mary's is now home to a speciality coffee shop, art gallery, treasury exhibition and performing arts space.

== History ==
=== Early Buildings ===
It is understood that the current St Mary's church is the fourth incarnation of the church on the site in the market square. It is thought that the first church on the site was built when the town was laid out by Bishop Clinton in around 1150 although first mention of it is in the 13th century.

A fire in 1291 destroyed most of the town including its churches. St Mary's was rebuilt in the 14th century. This medieval church consisted of an aisled chancel, an aisled nave, a west tower and a spire. The tower is believed to have been built in 1356. It was at this time that St Mary's achieved a special prominence in the city as the church of the religious guild of St Mary and St John the Baptist, founded in 1387 by the amalgamation of two existing guilds. This guild ran affairs of the city until 1538.

From 17th century the north side of the church became the burial place of Anthony Dyott (d. 1662) and later members of the Dyott family, who were the owners of Freeford Manor. The present church has a chapel dedicated to the Dyotts at its northern end.

The tower and spire of the medieval church consistently had structural failings over the years. The spire fell down in 1594 and 1626. Extensive repairs took place in the 17th century but it was to no avail when in 1716 it fell again. It was this collapse in 1716 which led to the rebuilding of the church, which began in 1716.

The church register dates from 1566 and includes the entry of Samuel Johnson's baptism which would have taken place in the latter years of the medieval church.

=== Neoclassical Style Building (1721–1868) ===
St Mary's in its previous classical form in the early 19th Century

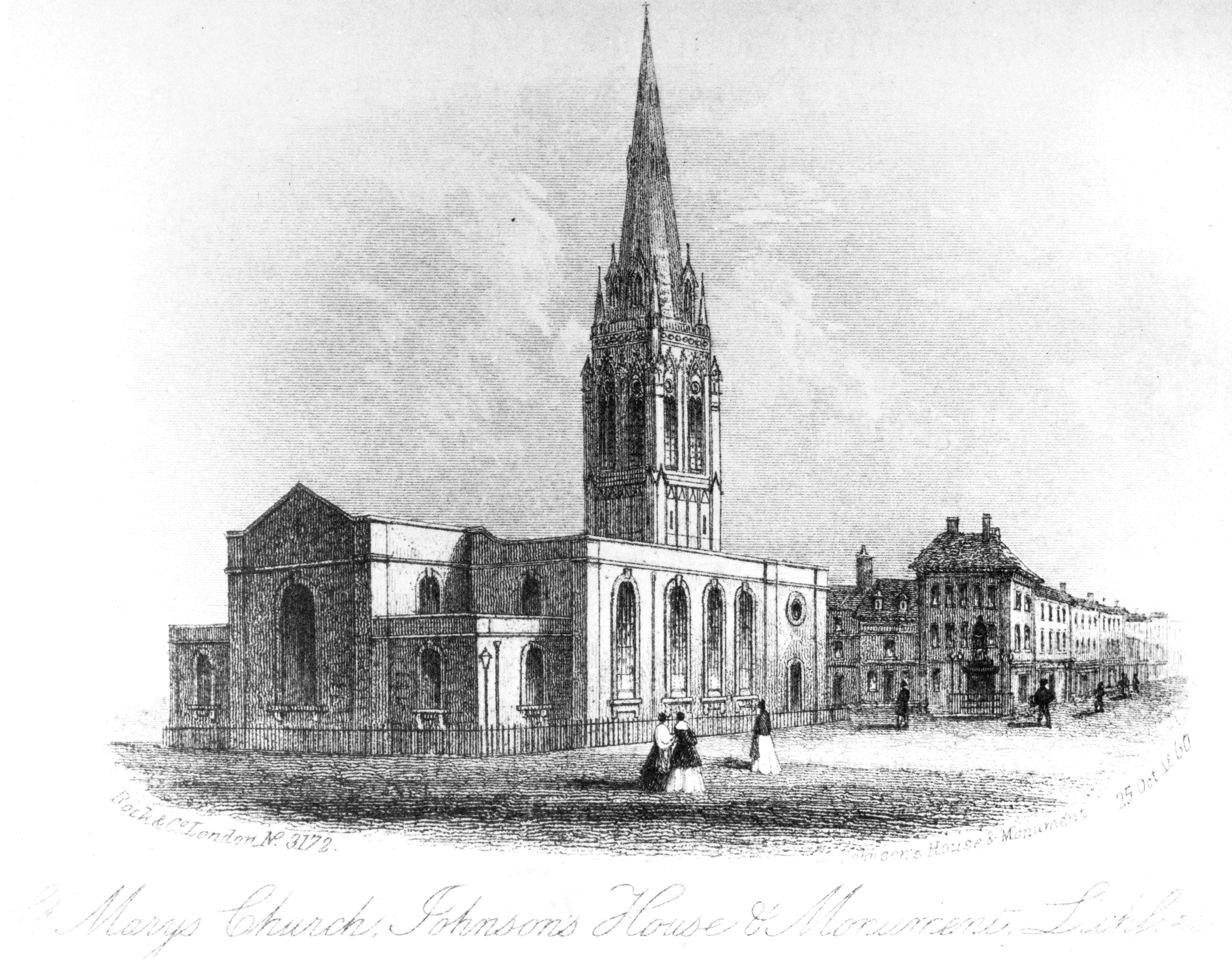
St Mary's during its transitional phase in 1860

The decision was made to demolish the medieval church in 1716. A new church designed by the architect Francis Smith of Warwick would be built in a neoclassical style. The construction of the new church was funded by public subscription, the Conduit Lands Trust and the Lichfield Corporation. After five years of construction the church was completed in 1721. These years of construction were probably overseen by Samuel Johnson who would have experienced his early childhood in the house facing onto the church. The church body was built in brick while the medieval tower was retained (without its spire) and encased in stucco. The new church consisted of a chancel, an aisled nave with north south and west galleries and a west tower.

Extensive repairs were carried out in 1806 and 1820 under Joseph Potter the Elder (a prominent Lichfield architect). In 1820 the brick exterior of the body of the church was covered in stucco.

By the mid 19th century there was much enthusiasm to rebuild the church in a Victorian Gothic style. A new building would also serve as a memorial to the former Vicar Rev. Henry Lonsdale, brother of Bishop Lonsdale who died in 1851 and was buried beneath the west tower. In 1853 the tower was lowered and remodelled in a Victorian Gothic style, complete with spire under a design by George Edmund Street. The architect also submitted a design for the main body of the church, but due to lack of funds rebuilding of the main church did not commence until 1868. For the last 15 years of the neoclassical style church it consisted of a gothic tower with spire and neoclassical style main body encased in stucco, the body of the church was demolished in 1868 after standing for 147 years.

=== Present Building (1870 – present) ===
The present building built in Derbyshire sandstone was completed in a Victorian Gothic style after two years construction in 1870. The architect for the building was James Fowler of Louth, it is not known if he used any of G. E. Street's original designs. The Lonsdale family met much of the cost towards the building. When complete the church consisted of a chancel, a chapel on its north side dedicated to the Dyott family, an aisled nave of four bays, and the tower and spire from 1853. By 1868 the lower part of the tower was dilapidated, much of it dating from the medieval church of the 14th century and was almost completely rebuilt. Charles Bateman incorporated some colour decorations to the interior of the church in the early 20th century.

The city centre population in Lichfield declined from the 1930s as people moved out to the suburbs and shops and businesses moved into the city centre. This inevitably led to a decline in congregation at St Mary's and a large city centre church with a capacity for 900 people was no longer viable. By the 1970s a committee was set up to save the historic building from abandonment and demolition. The proposal was to transform the space into a multi-functional building that would serve the community at the heart of the city. The church would have five sections, a social centre for senior citizens, a coffee shop, a gift shop, a heritage exhibition and the Dyott Chapel at the north end would remain as the parish church of St Mary for worship.

Works started on the transformation of the church in 1978 under the design of Hinton Brown Langstone of Warwick. Construction work was completed in December 1980 and the new centre opened on 30 May 1981.

During 2018, an award-winning £1.8 million renovation began. St Mary's reopened, refocusing their efforts on being home to everybody in the community. Downstairs houses the new Lichfield Library, where over 200,000 books are currently available. Upstairs, you will find a space that is used for community activities, events, musical gigs, performance arts and a host of other things.

The former parishes of St Mary's and St Michael on Greenhill were joined to form a single parish with St Michael's as the parish church and St Mary's designated as a Chapel of Ease. Together with St John's at Wall it forms a group of churches known as the United Benefice. Occasional services take place in the Dyott Chapel at the north end of the church.
