= Lichfield Museum =

Museum in Lichfield, Staffordshire, England

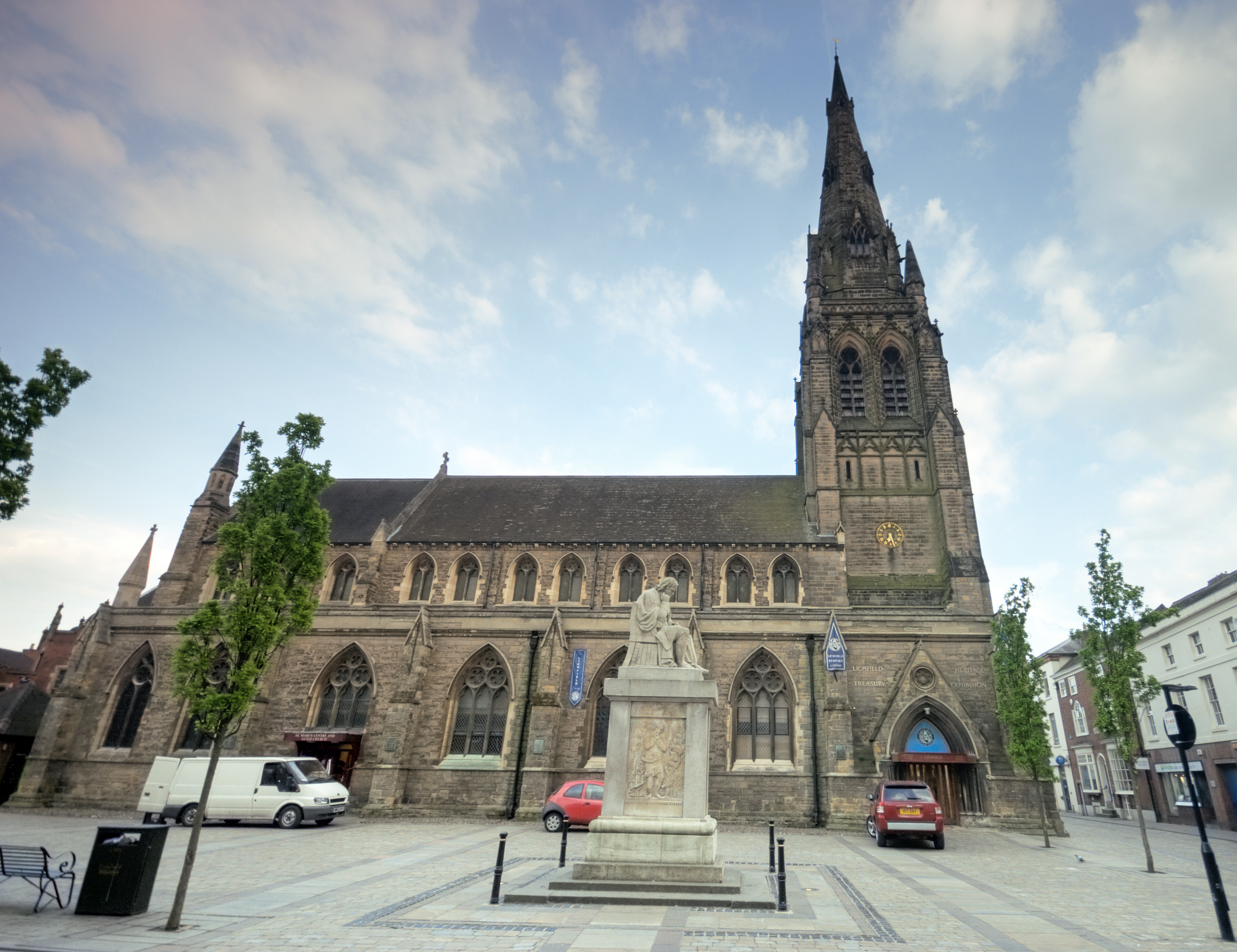
- Established: 1981
- Location: Market Square, Lichfield, Staffordshire, WS13 6LG England
- Coordinates: 52.683561°N 1.827403°W
- Website: http://www.lichfieldheritage.org.uk/

Lichfield Museum, formerly known as "Lichfield Heritage Centre", was dedicated to the history and heritage of the city of Lichfield, England. The museum was located on the south side of the market square on the second floor of St Mary's Church in the centre of Lichfield. Following the renovation of St. Mary's Church into a new community hub in 2018, the museum was dismantled.

The museum was opened by the Earl of Lichfield on 30 May 1981 when the 19th century city centre church was converted into a multi-purpose community building. The second floor of the church was dedicated to a museum and heritage exhibition dedicated to the history of Lichfield. The museum was run mainly by volunteers and is an independent Registered Charity and financially self-supporting.

== Features and exhibitions ==
The museum featured a treasury exhibition displaying chalices, goblets and centrepieces from the city, the Diocese of Lichfield and the Staffordshire Regiment. The Lichfield Heritage Collection featured over 6000 photographs; negatives; newspapers; reports; leaflets and other memorabilia from the past 150 years. A muniment room featured some of the oldest objects in the collection including the city's ancient charters, starting with Queen Mary's Charter of 1553. The Guild Book of St Mary's Guild of 1387 – 1680 was the oldest document exhibited. Audio-visual presentations featured stories into Lichfield's ancient past, the building of the Cathedral and the sieges during the Civil War.

The Staffordshire Millennium Embroideries are a unique representation of Staffordshire's thousand year history, embroidered in silk, wool, cotton, metallic thread and leather, one panel for each century of the Millennium. This work was created by Sylvia Everitt of Rawnsley, near Cannock, over five years as her gift to the people of Staffordshire in commemoration of the Millennium. She toured the county for years giving lectures about her embroideries before donating them. For her work Sylvia was awarded the MBE in 2002.

Tours were available to the top of St Mary's 158-year-old spire to a viewing platform 40m above the market square with views over the city and surrounding countryside.
