= Lichfield District =

Coordinates: 52.6809°N 1.8276°W

- Non-metropolitan district
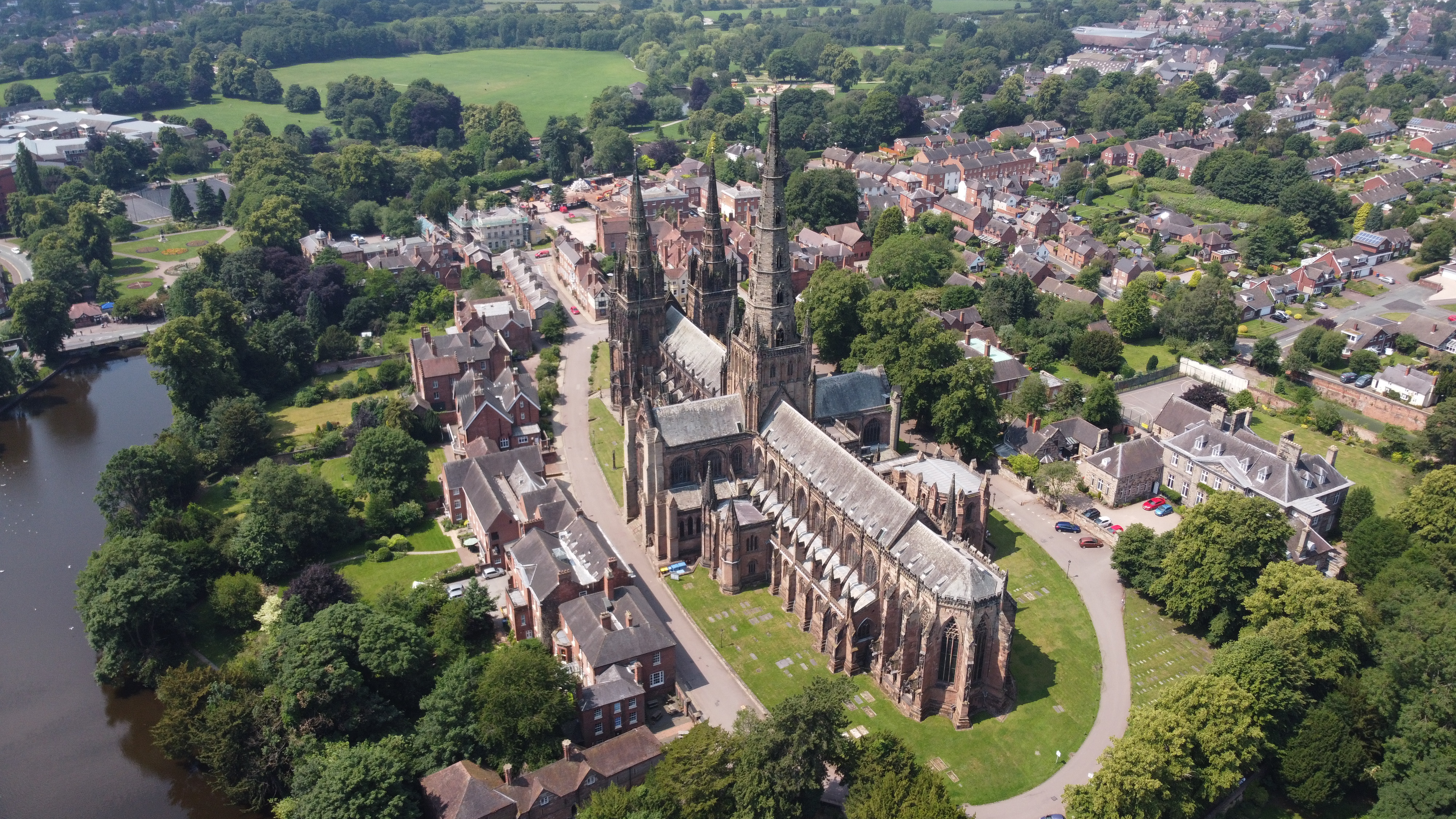
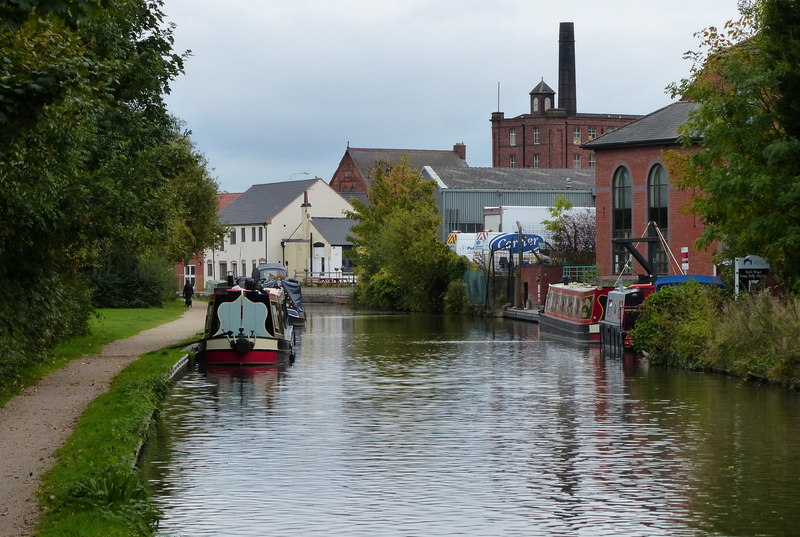
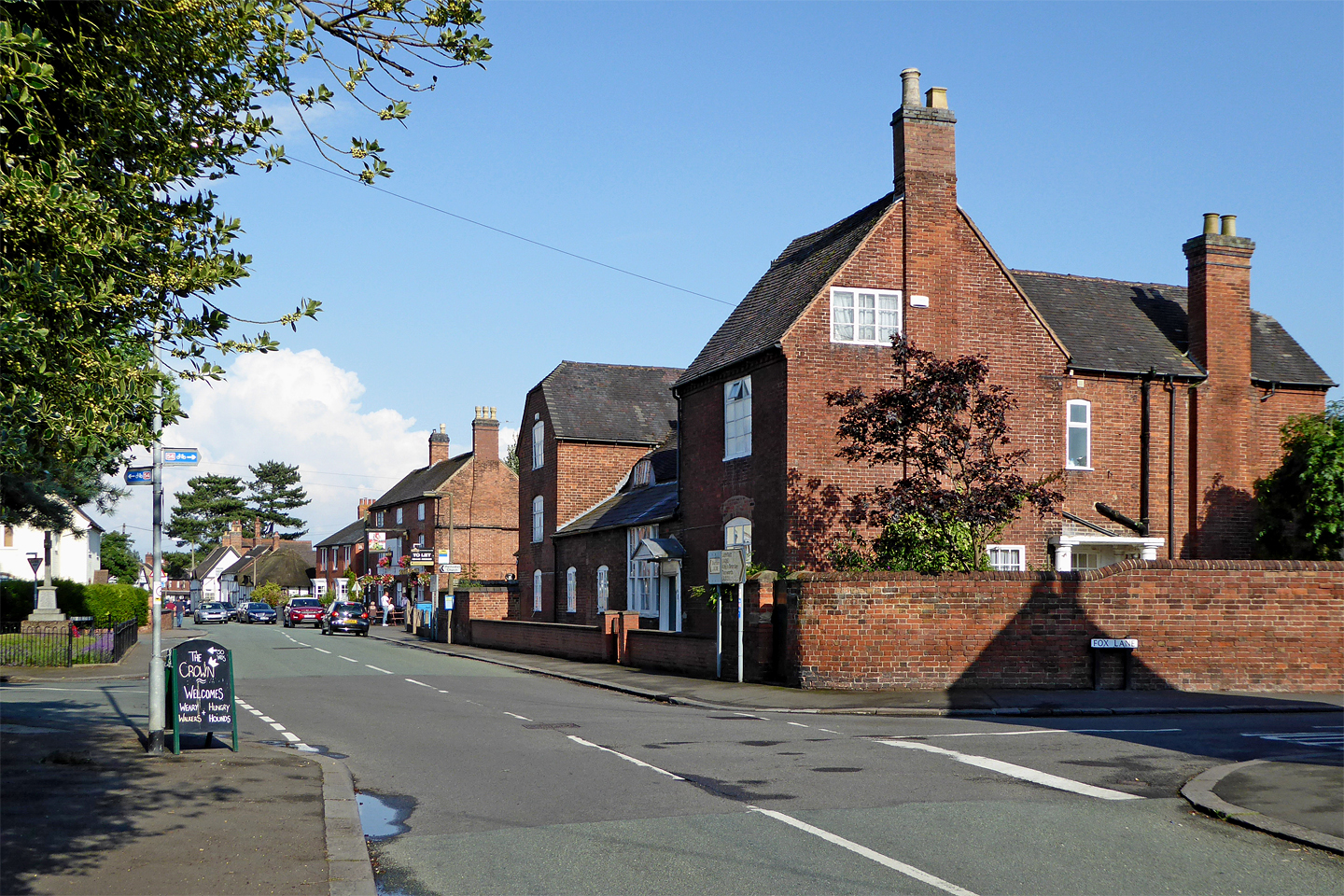
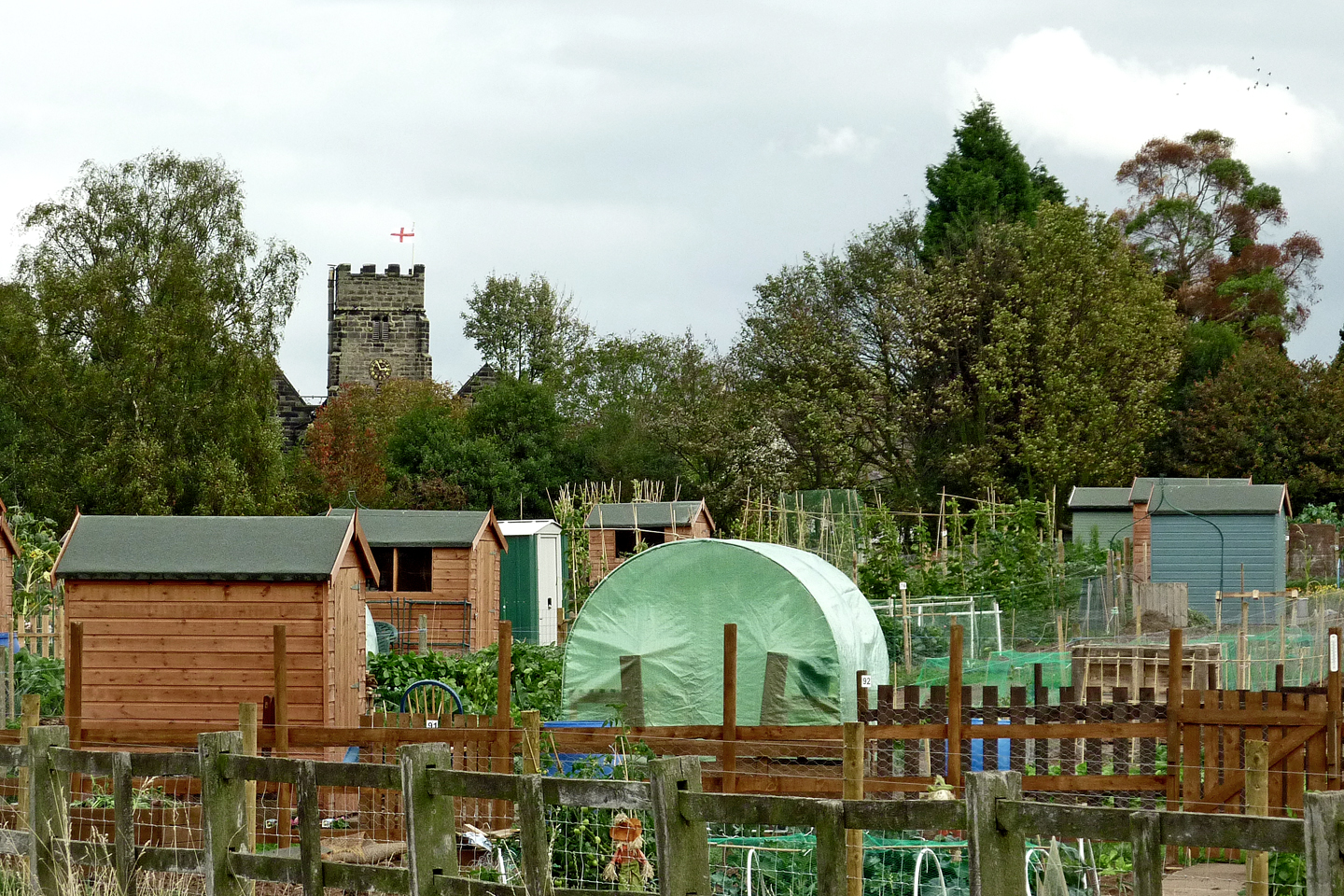
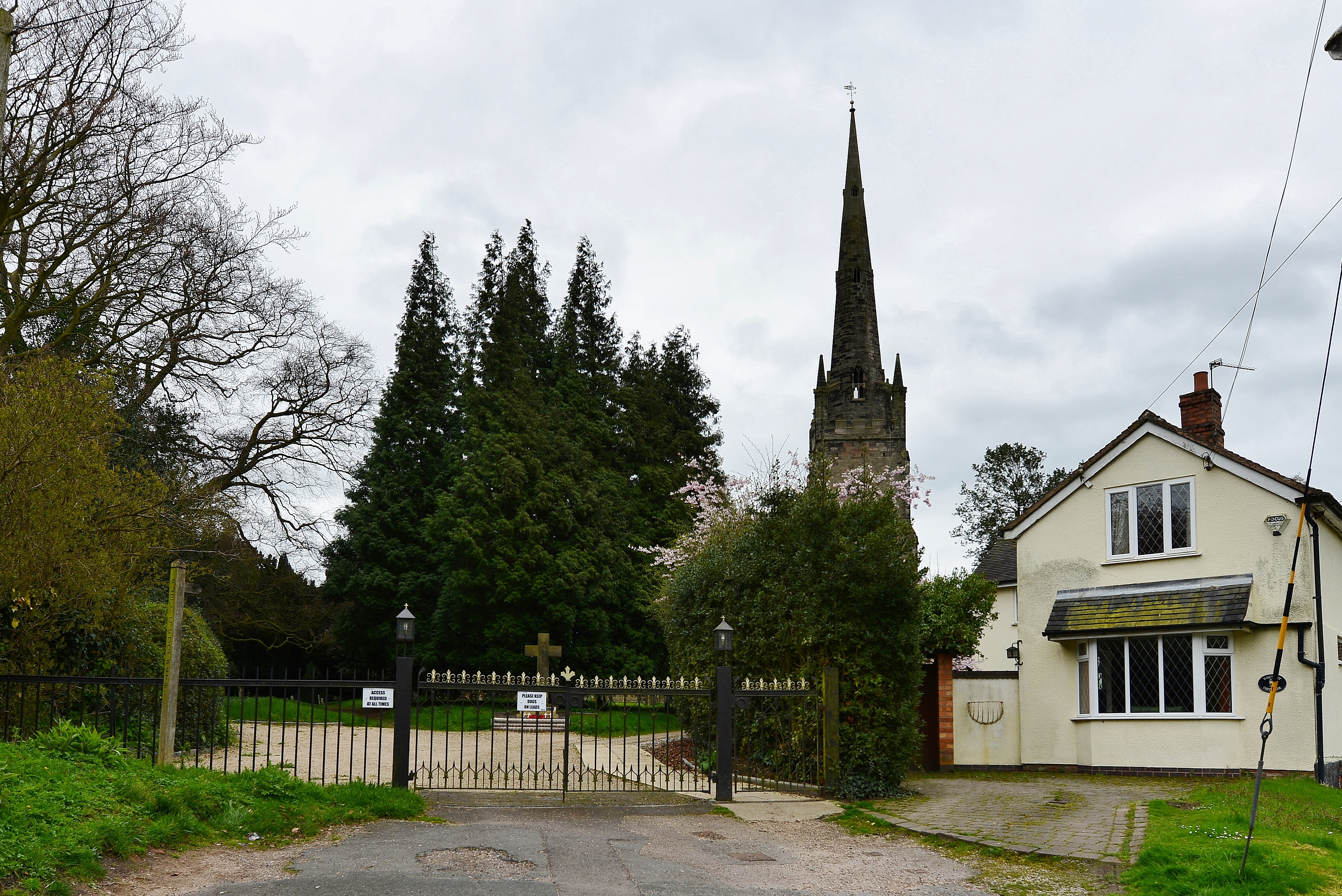
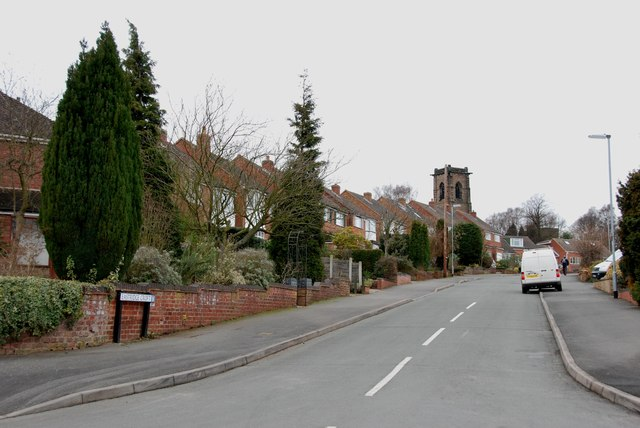
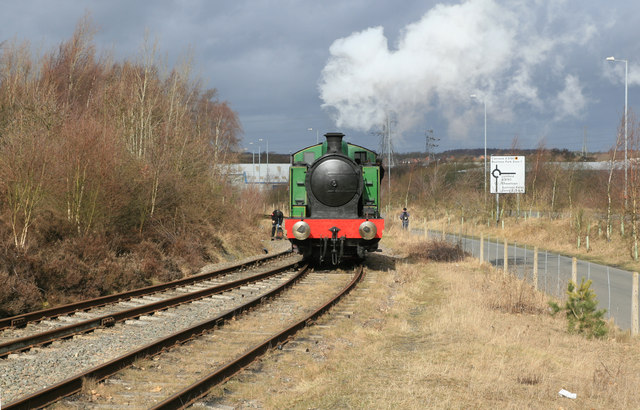
- From left to right; Top: Lichfield Cathedral from above; Middle 1st: Fazeley and Alrewas; Middle 2nd: Armitage and Clifton Campville; Bottom: Shenstone and the Chasewater Railway in Burntwood

- Shown within Staffordshire
- Sovereign state: United Kingdom
- Constituent country: England
- Region: West Midlands
- Ceremonial county: Staffordshire
- Admin HQ: Lichfield
- Created: 1 April 1974

Government
  - Type: Non-metropolitan district
  - MPs: Dave Robertson L Sarah Edwards L

Area
  - Total: 127.9 sq mi (331.3 km^{2})

Population (2025)
  - Total: 113,270 (Ranked 221st)

Ethnicity (2021)
  - Ethnic groups: List: 94.8% White; 2.3% Asian; 1.9% Mixed; 0.6% Black; 0.4% other

Religion (2021)
  - Religion: List: 57.1% Christianity; 40.1% no religion; 0.7% Islam; 0.5% Hinduism; 0% Judaism; 0.9% Sikhism; 0.2% Buddhism; 0.4% other
- Time zone: UTC0 (GMT)
  - Summer (DST): UTC+1 (BST)
- Post Code: WS7, 9, 13-15, DE13, B74-79
- Area code: 01543

Lichfield District (UK: /ˈlɪtʃˌfiːld/) is a local government district in Staffordshire, England. The district is named after its largest settlement, the city of Lichfield, which is where the district council is based. The district also contains the towns of Burntwood and Fazeley, along with numerous villages and surrounding rural areas, including part of Cannock Chase, a designated Area of Outstanding Natural Beauty.

The neighbouring districts are Cannock Chase, Stafford, East Staffordshire, South Derbyshire, North West Leicestershire, North Warwickshire, Tamworth, Birmingham and Walsall.

== History ==
The district was formed on 1 April 1974 under the Local Government Act 1972. The new district covered two former districts, which were both abolished at the same time:

- Lichfield Municipal Borough
- Lichfield Rural District (except the parish of Brindley Heath, which went to Cannock Chase)

The borough of Lichfield had held city status from time immemorial. When the new district was created the area of the former borough became an unparished area with charter trustees to preserve its city status and other civic dignities. In 1980 the area of the former borough was made a civil parish, the charter trustees were wound up and the city status was re-conferred onto the new parish of Lichfield. As such, "Lichfield City Council" is a parish council, whilst "Lichfield District Council" is a district council with wider powers and covering the much larger area of Lichfield District.

Between 2011 and 2023, Lichfield formed part of the Greater Birmingham & Solihull Local Enterprise Partnership.

== Abolition ==
Under current local government reorganisation plans, all district councils in Staffordshire, as well as the county council, will be abolished in 2028, with the district forming part of a new South and Mid Staffordshire unitary authority.

== Governance ==
Lichfield District Council

Type
- Type: Non-metropolitan district

History
- Founded: 1 April 1974

Leadership
- Chair: Thomas Marshall, Conservative since 19 May 2026
- Leader: Doug Pullen, Conservative since 21 May 2019
- Chief Executive: Simon Fletcher since 2021

Structure
- Seats: 47 councillors
- Graph of the party split among 47 seats.
- Political groups: Administration (21) Conservative (21) Other parties (26) Labour (14) Liberal Democrats (7) Green (1) Reform (1) Independent (3)

Elections
- Voting system: First past the post
- Last election: 4 May 2023

Meeting place
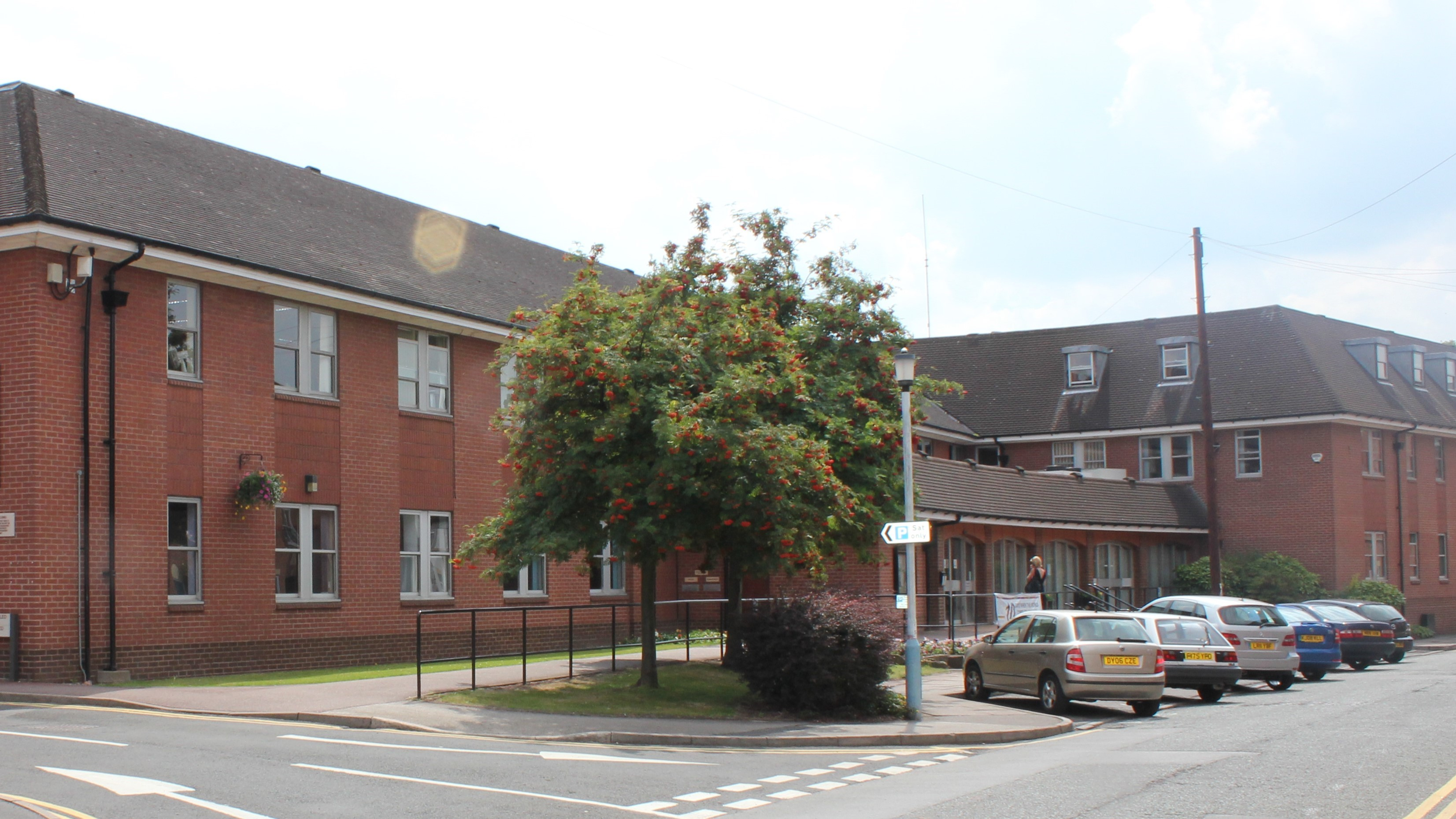
- District Council House, Frog Lane, Lichfield, WS13 6YU

Website
- lichfielddc.gov.uk

Lichfield District Council provides district-level services. County-level services are provided by Staffordshire County Council. The whole district is also covered by civil parishes, which form a third tier of local government.

=== Political control ===
The council has been under no overall control since the 2023 election, being run by a Conservative minority administration.

The first election to the district council was held in 1973, initially operating as a shadow authority alongside the outgoing authorities until the new arrangements took effect on 1 April 1974. Political control of the council since 1974 has been as follows:

Party in control	Years
No overall control	1974–1976
Conservative	1976–1995
Labour	1995–1999
Conservative	1999–2023
No overall control	2023–present

=== Leadership ===
The leaders of the council since 1977 have been:

Councillor	Party	From	To
David Lightbown	Conservative	1977	1983
Arnold Ward	Conservative	1983	May 1995
Peter Van Hagen	Labour	May 1995	Dec 1998
Tony Lanchester	Labour	Dec 1998	May 1999
David Smith	Conservative	May 1999	11 May 2010
Mike Wilcox	Conservative	11 May 2010	21 May 2019
Doug Pullen	Conservative	21 May 2019	

=== Composition ===
Following the 2023 election, and subsequent by-elections and changes of allegiance up to June 2026, the composition of the council was:

Party	Seats
Conservative	21
Labour	14
Liberal Democrats	7
Green	1
Reform	1
Independent	3
Total	47

=== Premises ===
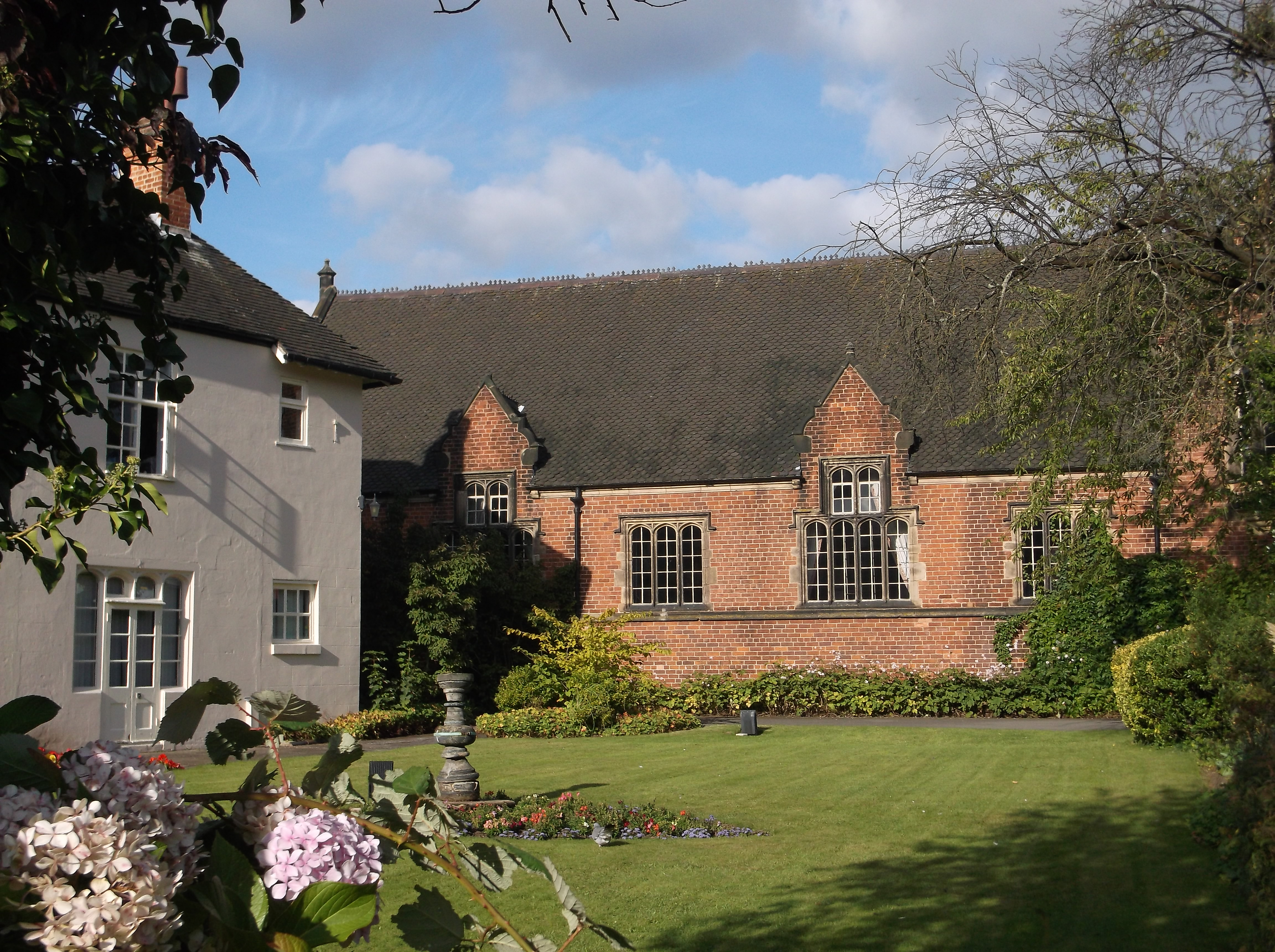
Old Grammar School: Headmaster's house (left) and old school room, now council chamber (right).

The district council is based at the District Council House on Frog Lane. The building began as Lichfield Grammar School, which had been founded in 1495 and moved to this site in 1577. The oldest surviving part of the complex is the former headmaster's house at 45 St John Street, built in 1682. The main school room behind the house was rebuilt in 1849. The school moved to new premises in 1903 and later became the King Edward VI School in 1971. The former school buildings at the corner of St John Street and Frog Lane were bought by Lichfield Rural District Council in 1917 and subsequently converted to be that council's offices in 1920. Following the local government reorganisation in 1974 the building passed to the current Lichfield District Council. A large extension was added in 1987 facing Frog Lane, incorporating a new main entrance. The 1849 school room serves as the council chamber.

== Elections ==
Since the last boundary changes in 2015 the council has comprised 47 councillors representing 22 wards, with each ward electing one, two or three councillors. Elections are held every four years.

=== Wards ===
Lichfield District's 22 wards are:

- Alrewas and Fradley
- Armitage with Handsacre
- Boley Park
- Boney Hay and Central
- Bourne Vale
- Chadsmead
- Chase Terrace
- Chasetown
- Colton and the Ridwares
- Curborough
- Fazeley
- Hammerwich with Wall
- Highfield
- Leomansley
- Little Aston and Stonnall
- Longdon
- Mease Valley
- Shenstone
- St John’s
- Stowe
- Summerfield and All Saints
- Whittington and Streethay

=== Wider political boundaries ===
The district includes areas in two parliamentary constituencies: Lichfield and Tamworth.

== Geography ==
=== Settlements within the district ===
- Alrewas, Armitage
- Blithbury, Burntwood
- Chase Terrace, Chasetown, Chesterfield, Chorley, Clifton Campville, Colton, Comberford, Croxall, Curborough
- Drayton Bassett
- Edingale, Elford, Elmhurst
- Farewell, Fazeley, Fisherwick, Fradley
- Gentleshaw
- Hademore, Hammerwich, Hamstall Ridware, Handsacre, Harlaston, Haunton, Hill Ridware, Hilliards Cross, Hints, Hopwas
- Kings Bromley
- Lichfield, Little Aston, Little Hay, Longdon
- Mavesyn Ridware, Mile Oak
- Orgreave
- Pipe Ridware
- Rileyhill
- Shenstone, Stockwell Heath, Stonnall, Streethay, Swinfen
- Thorpe Constantine
- Upper Longdon
- Wall, Weeford, Whittington, Wigginton

=== Parishes ===
The entire district is divided into civil parishes. The parish council for Lichfield itself takes the style "city council", and the parish councils for Burntwood and Fazeley take the style "town council".

== Demography ==
According to mid-2020 estimates, the population of Lichfield district is 105,637, with 53,583 (50.7%) of the population female.

In the 2011 census, 69% of the population reported their religion as Christianity, and 23% reported no religion. 6% did not state a religion, with the remainder reporting other religions. The most common ethnicity was White British, 94.6%, followed by Other White, 1.5%, and Asian/Asian British: Indian, 0.9%.

== Places of interest ==
Drayton Manor Theme Park

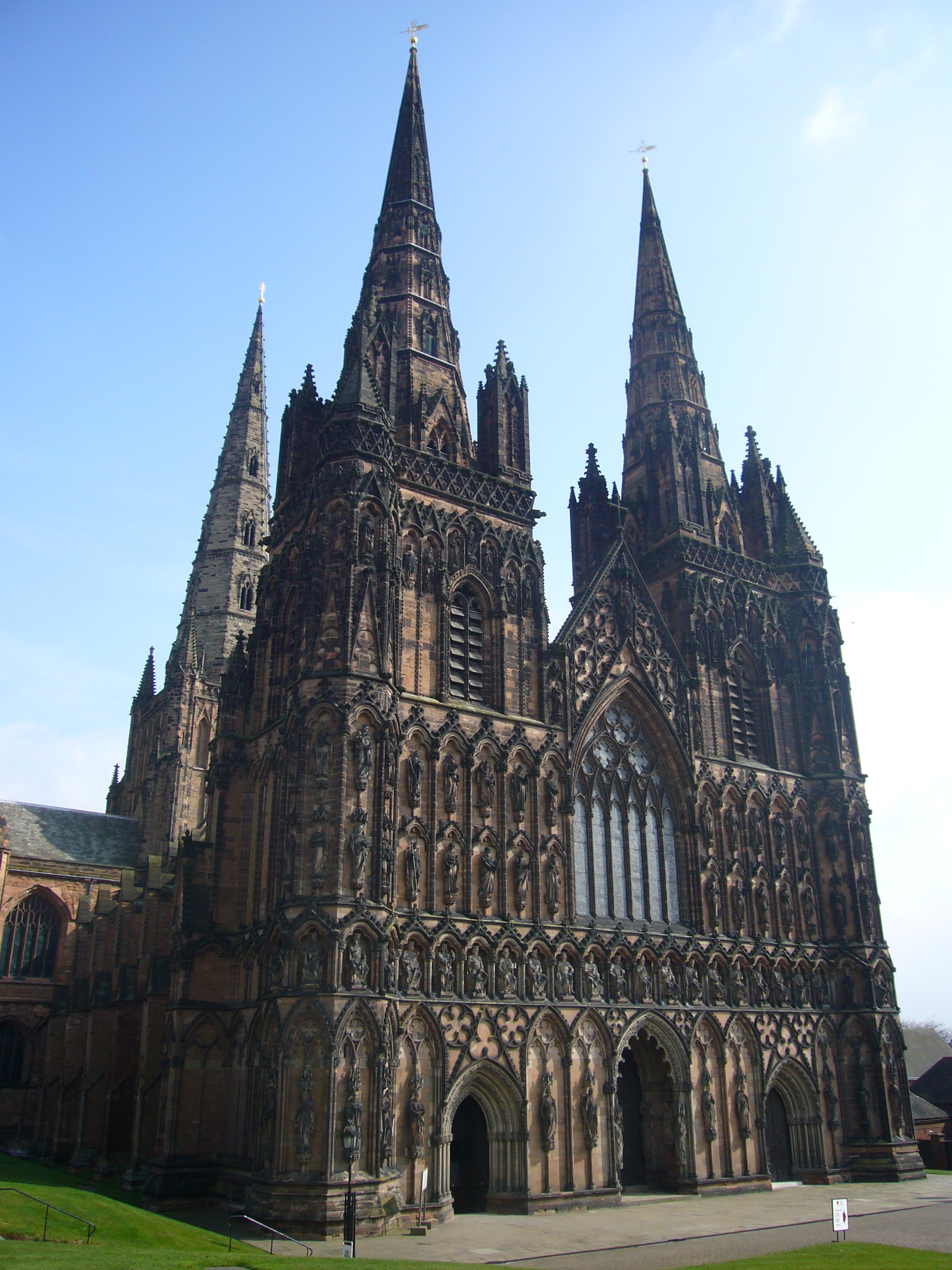
Lichfield Cathedral

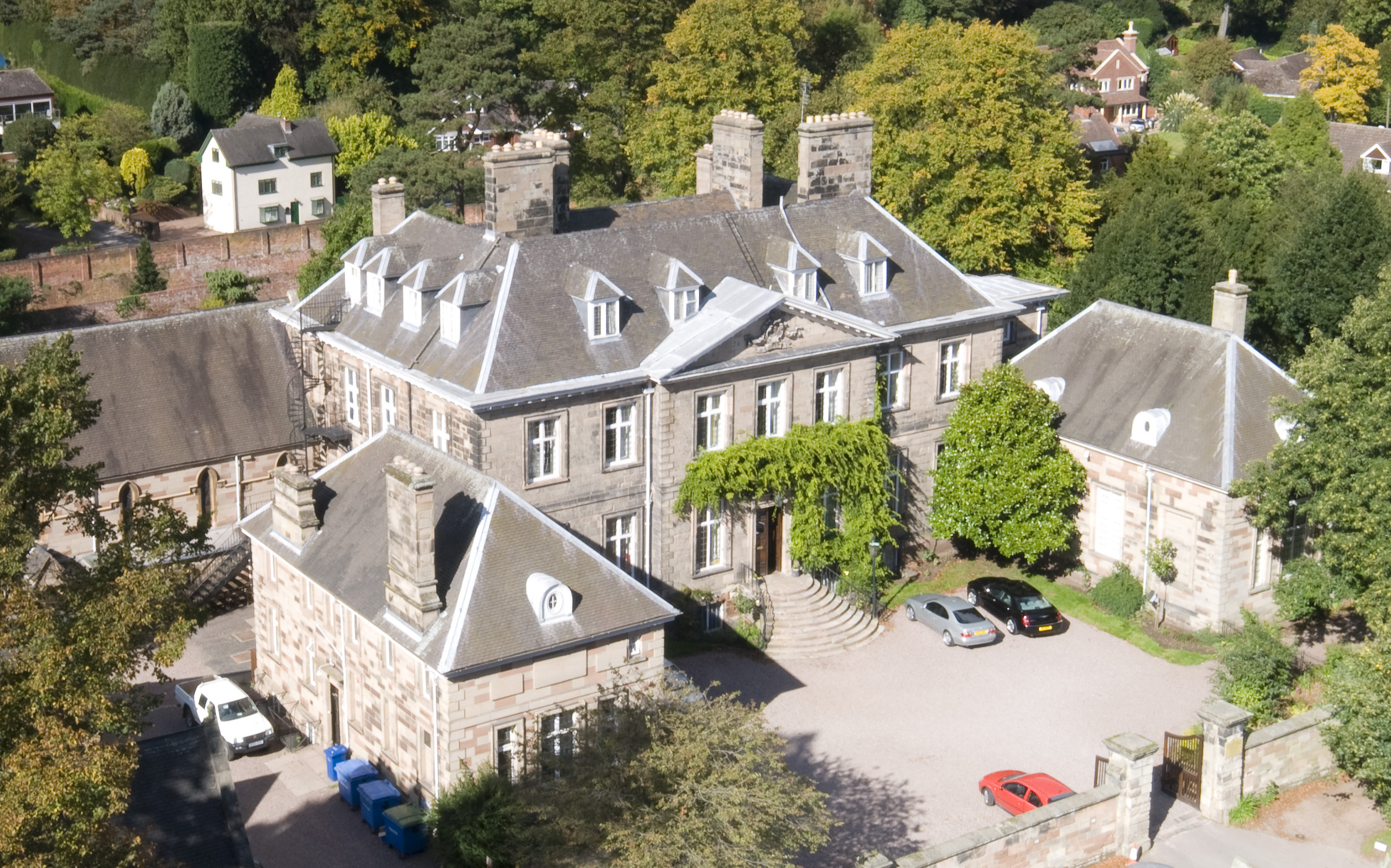
Bishop's Palace

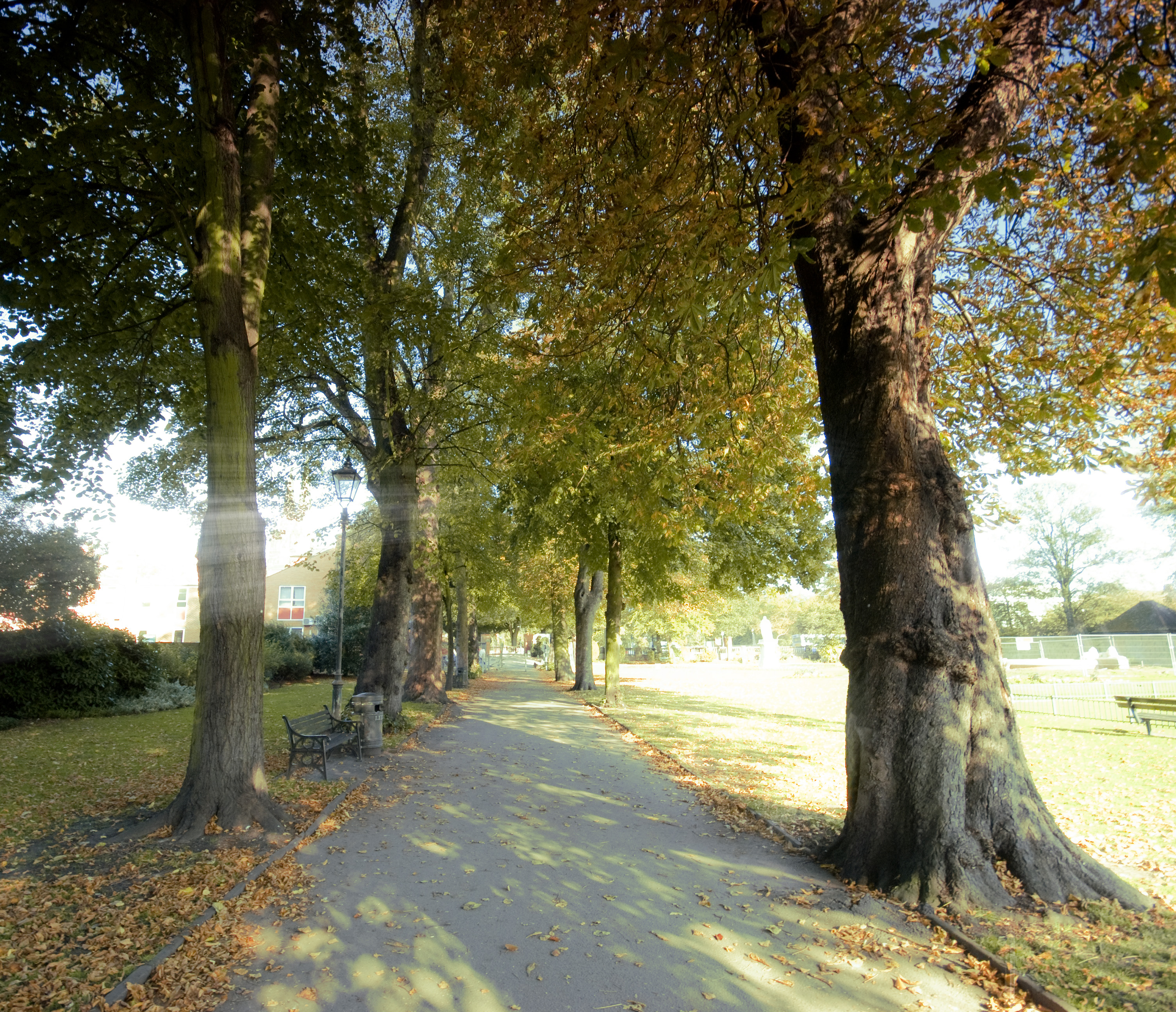
A path in Beacon Park

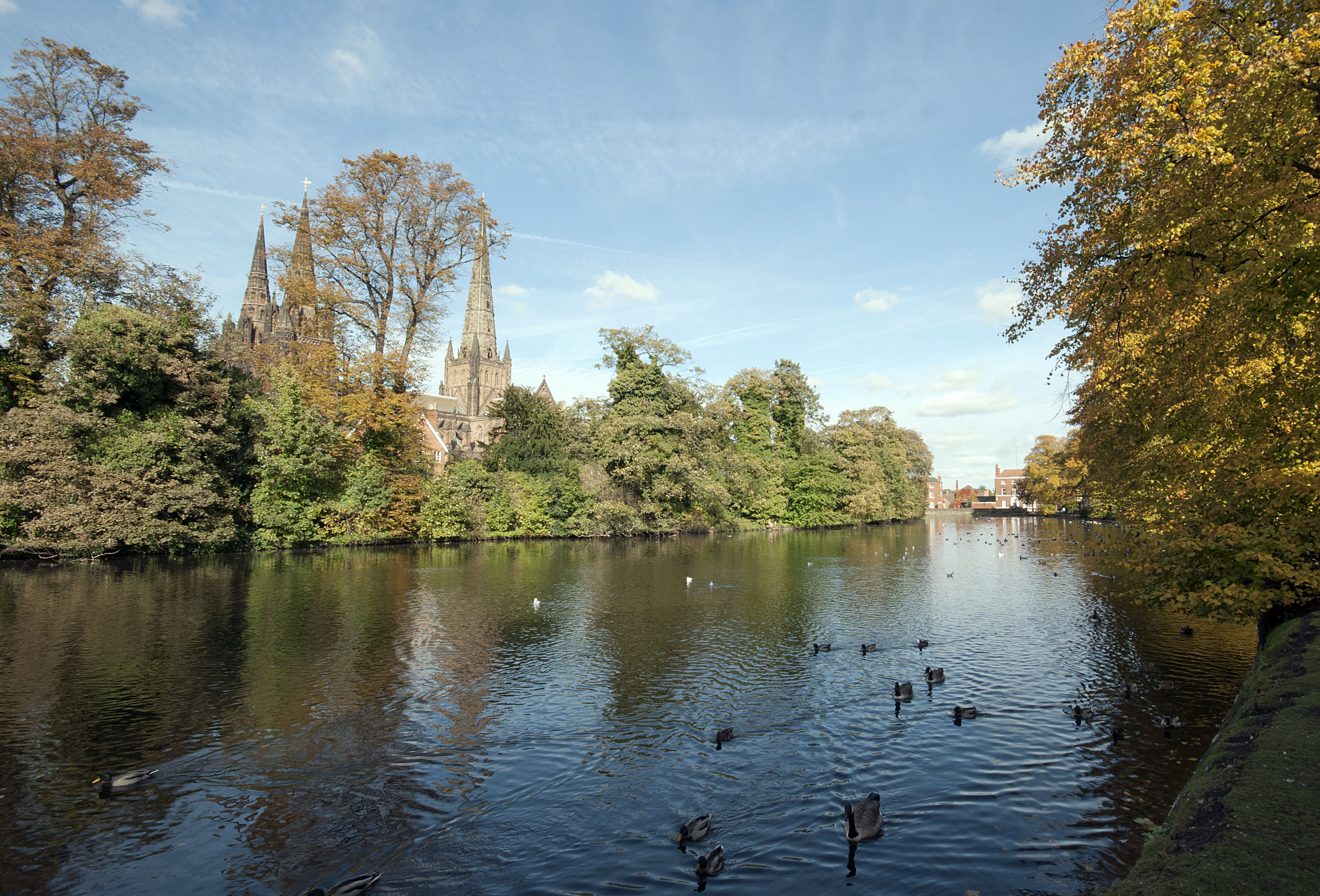
Minster Pool with Lichfield Cathedral in the background

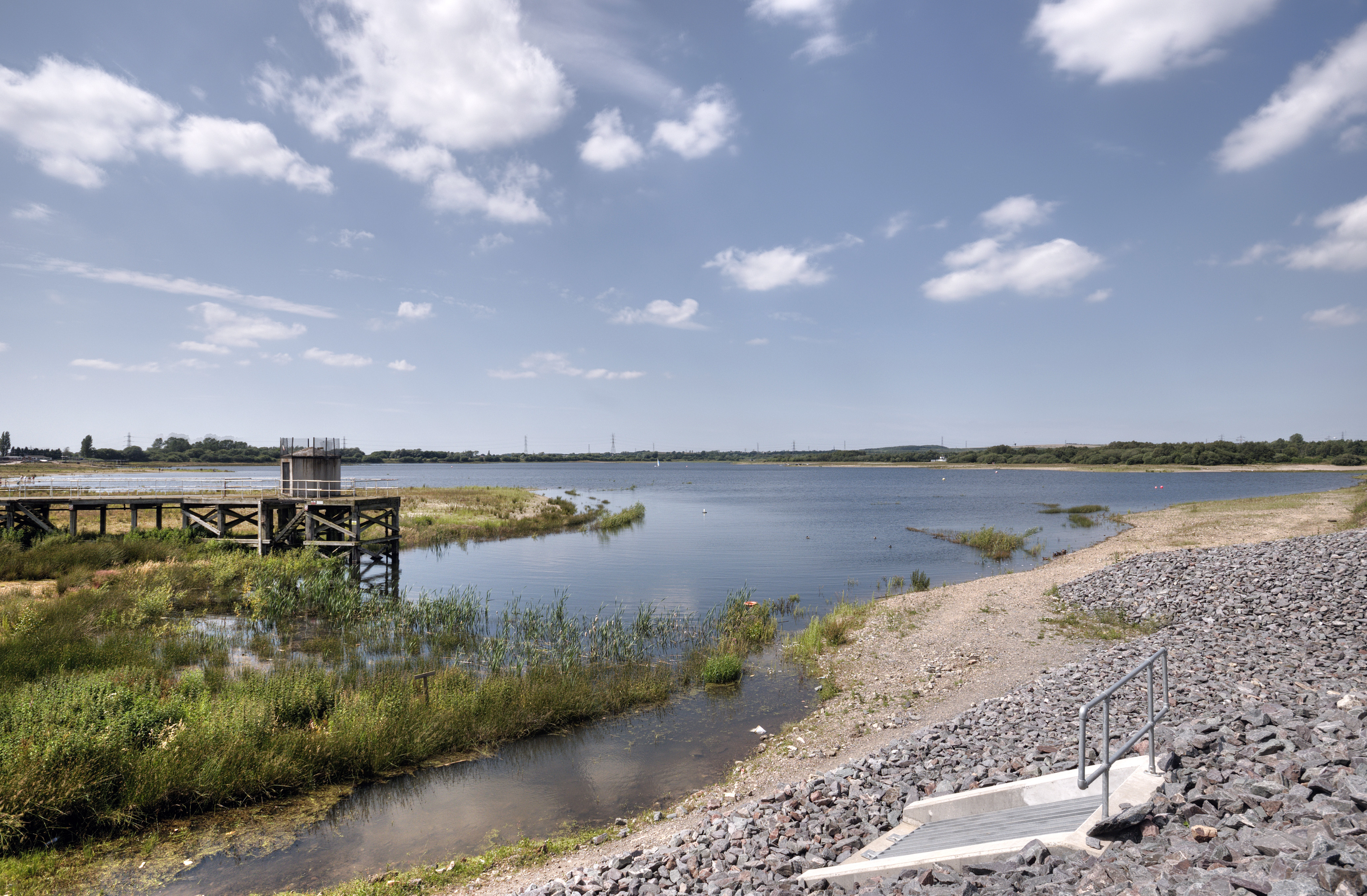
Chasewater

=== Adventure and excitement ===
- Drayton Manor Theme Park – A 280-acre theme park and zoo with 35 rides in total, including 5 roller coasters and 4 water rides.
- Curborough Sprint Course – A premier motorsport venue for speed sprinting against the clock.

=== Arts and entertainment ===
- Lichfield Garrick Theatre – A modern theatre seating 480 people, named after David Garrick who was brought up in Lichfield.

=== History and heritage ===
- Lichfield Cathedral – The only medieval cathedral in Europe with three spires. The present building was started in 1195, and completed by the building of the Lady Chapel in the 1330s. It replaced a Norman building begun in 1085 which had replaced one, or possibly two, Saxon buildings from the seventh century.
- Cathedral Close – Surrounding the Cathedral with its many fine buildings is one of the most unspoilt in the country.
- Samuel Johnson Birthplace Museum – A museum to Samuel Johnson's life, work and personality.
- Erasmus Darwin House – Home to Erasmus Darwin, the house was restored to create a museum which opened to the public in 1999.
- Lichfield Heritage Centre – in St Mary's Church in the market square, an exhibition of 2,000 years of Lichfield's history.
- Bishop's Palace – Built in 1687, the palace was the residence of the Bishop of Lichfield until 1954, it is now used by the Cathedral School.
- Milley's Hospital – Located on Beacon Street, it dates back to 1504 and was a women's hospital.
- Hospital of St John Baptist without the Barrs – A distinctive Tudor building with a row of eight brick chimneys. This was built outside the city walls (barrs) to provide accommodation for travellers arriving after the city gates were closed. It now provides a home for elderly people and has an adjacent Chapel.
- Church of St Chad – A 12th-century church though extensively restored, on its site is a Holy Well by which St Chad is said to have prayed and used the waters healing properties.
- St Michael on Greenhill – Overlooking the city the ancient churchyard is unique as one of the largest in the country at 9 acres (4 ha).
- Christ Church – An outstanding example of Victorian ecclesiastical architecture and a grade II* listed building.
- The Franciscan Friary – The ruins of the former Friary in Lichfield, now classed as a Scheduled Ancient Monument.
- Lichfield Clock Tower – A Grade II listed 19th century clock tower, located south of Festival Gardens.
- Letocetum – The remains of a Roman Staging Post and Bath House, in the village of Wall, 1-mile (1.6 km) south of the city.
- Staffordshire Regiment Museum – 2.5 miles (4 km) east of the city in Whittington, the museum covers the regiment's history, activities and members, and include photographs, uniforms, weapons, medals, artifacts, memorabilia and regimental regalia. Outdoors is a replica trench from World War I, and several armoured fighting vehicles.
- The Market Square – In the centre of the city of Lichfield, the square contains two statues, one of Samuel Johnson overlooking the house in which he was born, and one of his great friends and biographer, James Boswell.

=== Parks and the great outdoors ===
- Beacon Park – An 81-acre (33 ha) public park in the centre of the city, used for many sporting and recreational activities.
- Minster Pool & Stowe Pool – The two lakes occupying 16 acres in the heart of Lichfield, Stowe Pool is designated a SSSI site as it is home to native White-Clawed Crayfish.
- National Memorial Arboretum – 4 miles (6 km) northeast of the city in Alrewas, the arboretum is a national site of remembrance and contains many memorials to the armed services.
- Chasewater Country Park – A country park including a 3-square-kilometre reservoir which hosts a variety of activities including water skiing, sailing, angling and bird watching. The Chasewater habitat also supports several rare plant and animal species.
- Chasewater Railway – A 2 mile long, former colliery railway running round the shores of Chasewater.
- Garden of Remembrance – Located next to Lichfield Cathedral and Minster Pool, the garden was opened in 1920 to commemorate soldiers lost in the First World War.
- Gentleshaw Common – A Site of Special Scientific Interest that contains rare species of heathland plants.
- Fradley Junction – A canal junction between Fradley and Alrewas popular with gongoozlers and other visitors. Fradley Pool Nature Reserve is adjacent to the junction.
- Prince's Park – Located in Burntwood, it is featured in the Guinness Book of Records for being the smallest park in the United Kingdom.

=== Shopping and retail ===
- Three Spires Shopping Centre – The principal shopping area in the heart of Lichfield with over 40 stores and 750 parking spaces.
- Heart of the Country Shopping Village – A shopping village with shops, galleries and restaurants, 2 miles (3.2 km) south of Lichfield.

Plans have been approved for Friarsgate, a new £100 million shopping and leisure complex opposite Lichfield City Station. The police station, bus station, Ford garage and multi-storey car park will be demolished to make way for new retail space and leisure facilities consisting of a flagship department store, six-screen cinema, hotel, 37 individual shops, 56 apartments and over 700 car parking spaces.

== Staffordshire Hoard Discovery ==
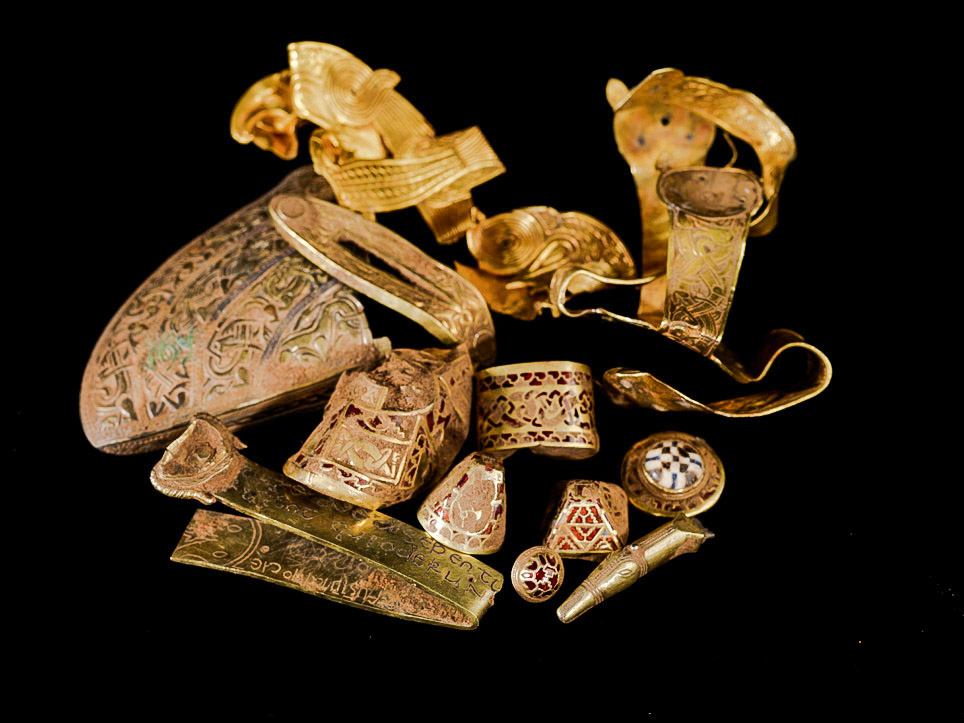
A selection of 'star items' from the Staffordshire Hoard

Discovered in a field near the village of Hammerwich, near Lichfield City, in Staffordshire, on 5 July 2009, the Staffordshire Hoard is the largest hoard of Anglo-Saxon gold and silver metalwork ever found. It consists of nearly 4,000 items that are nearly all martial in character. The artefacts have tentatively been dated to the 7th or 8th centuries, placing the origin of the items in the time of the Kingdom of Mercia.

The hoard was valued at £3.285 million, and was purchased by the Birmingham Museum & Art Gallery and the Potteries Museum & Art Gallery where items from the hoard are displayed.

== Media ==
=== Television ===
Local news and television programmes are provided by BBC West Midlands and ITV Central. Television signals are received from the Sutton Coldfield transmitter.

=== Radio ===
Radio stations for the area are:

BBC Local Radio

- BBC Radio WM
- BBC Radio Derby can also be received

Commercial

- Capital Mid-Counties
- Heart West Midlands
- Greatest Hits Radio Birmingham & The West Midlands
- Smooth West Midlands
- Hits Radio Birmingham

Community

- Cannock Chase Radio FM, a community radio station that broadcast from Cannock Chase.

=== Newspapers ===
Local newspapers are:

- Lichfield Mercury
- Lichfield Live.

== See also ==
- Lichfield District Council elections
