= Grade II* listed buildings in Cannock Chase (district) =

There are over 20,000 Grade II* listed buildings in England. This page is a list of these buildings in the district of Cannock Chase in Staffordshire.

== Listed buildings ==
| Name | Location | Type | Completed (Note: The date given is the date used by Historic England as significant for the initial building or that of an important part in the structure's description.) | Date designated | Grid ref. (Note: Sometimes known as OSGB36, the grid reference is based on the British national grid reference system used by the Ordnance Survey.) Geo-coordinates | Entry number (Note: The "List Entry Number" is a unique number assigned to each listed building and scheduled monument by Historic England.) | Image |
|---|---|---|---|---|---|---|---|
| Church of St James | Norton Canes | Church | 19th century | 15 June 1951 | SK0097407843; 52°40′06″N 1°59′13″W | 1060222 | Church of St James More images |
| Little Wyrley Hall | Little Wyrley, Norton Canes | Country house | Late 15th century or early 16th century | 21 December 1973 | SK0120205934; 52°39′04″N 1°59′01″W | 1294939 | Upload Photo |
| Brindley Bank Pumping Station | Rugeley | Boiler house | 1902–07 | 2 November 2006 | SK0379819484; 52°46′23″N 1°56′43″W | 1391807 | Brindley Bank Pumping Station More images |
| Church of St Augustine of Canterbury | Rugeley | Church | 1822–23 | 5 July 1972 | SK0452618524; 52°45′51″N 1°56′04″W | 1178139 | Church of St Augustine of Canterbury More images |
| Council House (now Cannock Chase Technical College) | High Green | Council house | Mid-18th century | 15 June 1951 | SJ9793510242; 52°41′23″N 2°01′55″W | 1060217 | Council House (now Cannock Chase Technical College) More images |
| Gates, railings and gate piers of Council House | Cannock | Gate | 19th century | 21 December 1973 | SJ9795010222; 52°41′23″N 2°01′54″W | 1180287 | Upload Photo |
| Parish Church of St Luke | Cannock | Church | 14th/15th century | 15 June 1951 | SJ9814410147; 52°41′20″N 2°01′44″W | 1295000 | Parish Church of St Luke More images |

== See also ==
- Grade I listed buildings in Staffordshire
- Grade II* listed buildings in Staffordshire
  - Grade II* listed buildings in East Staffordshire
  - Grade II* listed buildings in Lichfield (district)
  - Grade II* listed buildings in Newcastle-under-Lyme (borough)
  - Grade II* listed buildings in South Staffordshire
  - Grade II* listed buildings in Stafford (borough)
  - Grade II* listed buildings in Staffordshire Moorlands
  - Grade II* listed buildings in Stoke-on-Trent
  - Grade II* listed buildings in Tamworth (borough)
