= Lynda Grier =

British educational administrator and policy advisor

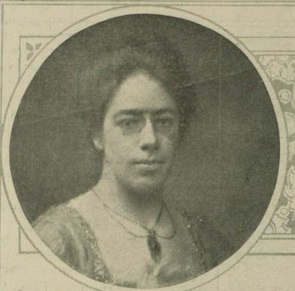
Lynda Grier, 1919

Lynda Grier, CBE (3 May 1880 – 21 August 1967) was a British educational administrator, policy advisor, and the principal of Lady Margaret Hall, Oxford, from 1921 to 1945.

== Biography ==
Born in Staffordshire, Grier was profoundly deaf as a child, which resulted in her lack of formal education. When she and her mother, after her father's death, moved to Cambridge, Grier obtained permission to attend lectures at Newnham College as an external student. In order to enroll formally, she had to teach herself basic math and languages to fill the gaps in her prior reading education. Graduating in 1908, she became an assistant teacher at Newnham and in 1913 was promoted to assistant lecturer. In 1915, she transferred to the University of Leeds, where she taught economics until the war ended.

In 1921, Grier was appointed as the principal of Lady Margaret Hall, Oxford and worked on the overhaul of the college to meet post-war educational requirements. She served on many commissions and committees for the church and government to improve British pedagogy and educational policy. She was involved in some of the most important educational reforms in the interwar period and was one of the authors of both the Hadow Reports and the Spens Report. She became the first woman to serve on Oxford's Hebdomadal Council in 1926. Retiring as principal in 1945, she went abroad to China on behalf of the British Council in 1947. As the post for the Council representative in Shanghai was vacant, she was invited to take the post. Serving from 1948 to 1950, she remained in abroad, traveling widely to evaluate education in the country in spite of the dangers of the Chinese Communist Revolution. She was honoured as a Commander in the Order of the British Empire in 1951 and in 1953, was the first Cambridge-educated woman to receive an honorary degree from the university. She died in 1967 and is remembered for her work in developing women's education and education policy in Britain.

== Early life and education ==
Mary Lynda Dorothea Grier was born on 3 May 1880 in Rugeley, Staffordshire to Grace (née Allen) and Richard MacGregor Grier (1835–1894). Her father was the rural dean of Rugeley and prebendary of Lichfield. Her mother was the daughter of John Allen, archdeacon of Shropshire.

She was the younger sister of Sir Selwyn MacGregor Grier, who would become a British colonial administrator, Governor-in-Chief of the Windward Islands from 1935 to 1937. During her childhood, Grier was deaf and because of her condition was taught at home by an aunt and her mother, who did not understand that her learning difficulties stemmed from her inability to hear. She taught herself to lip read and studied books from her father's library. The family were poor, but became impoverished when her father moved them to Hednesford, a mining town in the South Staffordshire coalfield area. His subsequent death in 1894, created greater economic strain and the family lived with relatives for some time before moving to Cannock.

In 1904, Grier and her mother relocated to Cambridge. As her hearing had improved, she began attending lectures of the British Association for the Advancement of Science and met Mary Paley Marshall. Marshall allowed Grier to attend Newnham College, Cambridge as an external student, while she worked on her own to complete the gaps in her education. To pass her Tripos in 1908, Grier had to learn basic math, as well as French, Greek and Latin. She and her classmate Eva Spielman (later Hubback) achieved first class honours in the Economics examination, Part II, outranking any of their male classmates. After graduating, she worked with Marshall as a teaching assistant until 1913.

== Career ==
In 1913, Grier was appointed as an assistant lecturer at Newnham and two years later, she was elevated to lecturer. That year, she became a mentor to Barbara Wootton, laying out a reading list for the reluctant classics student to improve her studies in economics. Later that year, she was teaching the economics courses at the University of Leeds, which D. H. MacGregor had to abandon because he was called into the service during World War I.

During her time at Leeds, Grier recognized that she was drawn to the field of education. Having lacked opportunity in her own childhood, she was particularly interested in providing educational opportunities for others who had similar experiences. She became a strong supporter of the Workers' Educational Association and vice-chancellor, Michael Sadler, who believed that the university had a public duty to serve the broader community. She also met the vice principal of the normal school in Leeds, Winifred Mercier, who would become an influence on her. In later life, Grier wrote biographies of both Mercier and Sadler.

At the end of the war, Grier returned to Newnham as a fellow. She also worked at Bedford College, London, tutoring economics. In 1921, she was appointed as the third principal of Lady Margaret Hall, Oxford, succeeding Henrietta Jex-Blake in the role. She began her tenure focusing on overhauling the university structure from the accommodations to the finances. She oversaw drafting of a constitution to establish college regulations which would increase the staff and student populations and meet the post-war educational demands of women. She introduced philosophy and political students to economics, insisting that it was a behavioural science.

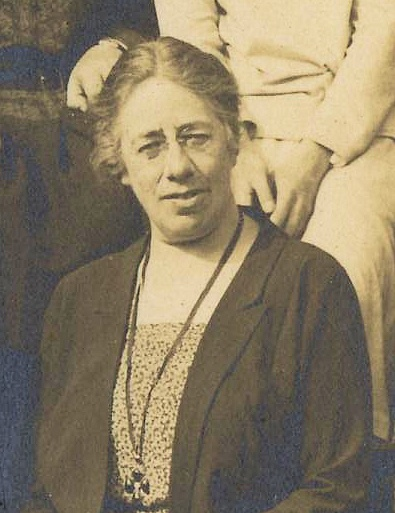
Grier, 1929

In 1924, Grier became a member of the Board of Education's Consultative Committee. The committee was the first in the UK to include women in an official government commission and they were charged with giving expert advice on education. From the beginning of the Consultative Committee in 1899, the women members who served used their cause of creating improvements for girls' and women's education, as part of the specific political aim of improving the status of women. Grier joined at the time when the Consultative Committee had made changes in their structure so allow the members, rather than the Board of Education, to direct their fields of study. She worked on reports which became extremely important in British pedagogy and educational policy in the interwar years. These included the Hadow Reports, "The Education of the Adolescent (1927), Primary Education (1931), and Infant and Nursery Schools (1933); and the Spens Report on Secondary Education (1938)".

Grier was invited in 1925 to serve as president of Section F (economics) of the British Association for the Advancement of Science, which was an unusual distinction for a woman at that time. In 1926, she became the first woman to serve on the Hebdomadal Council of Oxford University. This body was the policy-forming council for the university and throughout her tenure, she served on various committees to improve the overall university system. From 1927 to 1929, she was a member of the Archbishop's Commission on religious education and in 1932, she was appointed for a second term on the Consultative Committee. She would share the distinction with Essie Conway of being the longest serving women members of the Consultative Committee, each consulting for 14 years.

Grier supported the founding of Nuffield College in 1937 and served as chair of its education committee from 1943 to 1946, while at the same time serving as faculty fellow from 1944 to 1945. In 1945, she was appointed president of Section L (education) of the British Association for the Advancement of Science. That year, she retired as principal of Lady Margaret Hall, but her retirement was short-lived. At the request of the British Council, Grier embarked on an educational lecturing tour of China in 1947 and when the Chinese representative to the council vacated their post in 1948, she accepted the appointment as replacement. She remained in China until 1950, during the Chinese Communist Revolution, and in spite of the dangers, traveled widely to evaluate educational facilities.

When she returned to Britain, Grier was appointed a Commander of the Order of the British Empire (CBE) in the 1951 New Year Honours. For the next several years, Grier lectured and did broadcast work on the history and challenges faced in China. She was awarded the first honorary Doctor of Laws given to a woman graduate of Cambridge in 1953. In 1961, she embarked on a world tour, but had to abandon it due to illness. Increasingly in her later years, she had ill-health, becoming extremely deaf and experiencing partial-paralysis.

== Death and legacy ==
Grier died in London on 21 August 1967 and was buried beside her parents in Hednesford. She is remembered as a pioneer in women's education and developing the educational policies throughout the United Kingdom.

== Selected works ==
- Grier, Lynda (December 1925). "The Meaning of Wages". The Economic Journal. 35 (140). London: MacMillan & Co. for the Royal Economic Society: 519–535. doi:10.2307/2222974. ISSN 0013-0133. JSTOR 2222974. OCLC 5545389699. S2CID 46630538.
- Grier, Lynda (1937). The Life of Winifred Mercer. London: Oxford University Press. OCLC 1101212556.
- Grier, Lynda (1952). Achievement in Education: The Work of Michael Ernest Sadler, 1885–1935. London: Constable. OCLC 903612999.
- Grier, Lynda (April 1952). "Red China in Perspective". International Affairs. 28 (2). Oxford: Blackwell Publishing for the Royal Institute of International Affairs: 263–264. doi:10.2307/2604144. ISSN 0020-5850. JSTOR 2604144. OCLC 5135176228.
