= St Etheldreda's Church =

Saint/St/St. Etheldreda's Church or the Church of Saint/St/St. Etheldreda may refer to any church dedicated to Æthelthryth or Etheldreda.

These churches include:

== England ==
(A-Z by English county)

- St Etheldreda's Church, Ely, Cambridgeshire
- St Etheldreda's Church, Histon, Cambridgeshire (demolished 1596)
- St Etheldreda's Church, White Notley, Essex
- St Etheldreda's Church, Hatfield, Hertfordshire
- St Etheldreda's Church, London, also known by location Ely Place or Holborn
- St Etheldreda's Church, Norwich, Norfolk
- St Etheldreda's Church, Horley, Oxfordshire
- Church of St Etheldreda, West Quantoxhead, Somerset
- St Joseph and St Etheldreda, Rugeley, Staffordshire

== Wales ==
- St Etheldreda's Church, Hyssington
