= Listed buildings in Rugeley =

Rugeley is a market town and a civil parish in the district of Cannock Chase, Staffordshire, England. It contains 30 buildings that are recorded in the National Heritage List for England. Of these, two are listed at Grade II*, the middle grade, and the others are at Grade II, the lowest grade. The parish contains three churches, the current parish church of St Augustine, the remains of its predecessor, and a Roman Catholic church; items in the churchyards of the first two churches are also listed. Most of the other listed buildings are houses and cottages, the earliest of which are timber framed. The rest of the listed buildings include a two public houses, a bridge, two boundary stones, and a water pumping station.

== Key ==
Grade	Criteria
II*	Particularly important buildings of more than special interest
II	Buildings of national importance and special interest

== Buildings ==
Name and location	Photograph	Date	Notes	Grade
Remains of Old St Augustine's Church; 52.76488°N 1.93544°W		12th century	What remains of the church is the west tower, the chancel and its north chapel, and a four-bay arcade joining them. They are in Early English style, and the tower has buttresses and an embattled parapet.	II
16 and 18 Horse Fair; 52.75773°N 1.93598°W	—	Early 16th century (probable)	A pair of houses in timber framing and painted brick with a tile roof. There is one storey and an attic, three bays, and a later gabled wing at the left painted to resemble timber framing. The doorways have moulded surrounds, and the windows are casements, those in the attic with gables breaking through the eaves.	II
20 Horse Fair; 52.75761°N 1.93579°W	—	Early 16th century (probable)	The house is partly timber framed and partly in painted brick, and has a tile roof. There is one storey and an attic, and two bays. The doorway has a moulded surround, the windows are casements, and there are two gabled dormers.	II
The Stone House; 52.75658°N 1.95791°W	—	Early 16th century	The house was much altered and extended in about 1800. It is in stone, and has two storeys, attics and a basement, a front of two gabled bays, and a later projecting gabled wing on the left. In the original part the windows are mullioned and transomed, in the later part they are replacements, and all have hood moulds. In the front is a gabled porch.	II
Red Lion Inn; 52.76138°N 1.93425°W		c. 1600	The public house is timber framed, the front has been rebuilt in brick, the right gable end is in stone, and there is exposed timber framing in the left gable end and at the rear. There is one storey and an attic, and a front of three bays. On the front are two doorways with moulded surrounds, one with a pediment. The windows have segmental heads, and there are three gables dormers breaking through the eaves.	II
32 and 34 Market Street; 52.76239°N 1.93353°W		Late 16th or early 17th century	A timber framed house, later divided into two, partly roughcast and partly with plaster infill, and with a tile roof. There are two storeys and five bays. The windows are casement windows, and No. 34 has a doorway with a plain surround and a canted bay window.	II
31 and 33 Market Square; 52.76036°N 1.93520°W	—	17th century	Most of the building dates from the 18th century. It is stuccoed with quoins, moulded eaves, a panelled parapet, and a slate Mansard roof. There are two storeys and an attic, and three bays. The middle bay contains a doorway with Tuscan pilasters, a frieze with triglyphs, and a curved pediment. The left bay contains a bank front, and the right bay a 19th-century shop front. The windows are sashes with keyblocks, the window above the doorway having a moulded architrave, and there are two gabled dormers.	II
Tomb of Elizabeth Cuting and Emma Hollinhurst; 52.76479°N 1.93507°W	—	1696	The tomb is in the churchyard of the old St Augustine's Church. It is a table tomb in stone, and the slab is carved in semi-relief with two effigies in linen shrouds.	II
Garden wall, 22–30 Horse Fair; 52.75759°N 1.93556°W	—	18th century (probable)	The wall running in front of the gardens is in plain ashlar stone.	II
9 Wolseley Road; 52.76395°N 1.93644°W	—	Late 18th century	A red brick house with side pilasters, bands, dentilled eaves, and a parapet. There are three storeys and five bays. The central doorway has a moulded surround and a curved voluted pediment, and the windows are sashes.	II
Crossley Stone; 52.76025°N 1.93785°W	—	Late 18th century	A red brick house on a corner site with end pilasters, bands, moulded eaves, a blocking course, and a hipped tile roof. There are three storeys, four bays on Crossley Stone, and three on Bow Street. On both fronts is a doorway with a moulded surround, that on Crossley Stone with a curved voluted pediment. The windows are sashes with cambered heads.	II
Chaseley; 52.76110°N 1.95795°W	—	c. 1780	Originally a workhouse, later a private house, it is in stuccoed red brick, and has side pilasters surmounted by ball finials, a moulded band, a moulded eaves cornice, and a parapet. There are three storeys and four bays. On the front is a Tuscan porch with a frieze, a modillion cornice, and a pediment, and a doorway with a moulded surround. The windows are sashes in moulded architraves.	II
Ornamental Bridge, Lakeside; 52.75899°N 1.94421°W	—	1790s	The bridge crosses Rising Brook in the grounds of the house. It is in stone and consists of a single segmental arch with rusticated voussoirs, and abutments with scrolled coping. On the bridge is a wrought iron balustrade and a cast iron handrail, and at the ends are four circular piers surmounted by vases, two of which are inscribed.	II
Boundary stone on the north bank of Rising Brook; 52.75109°N 1.95710°W	—	Late 18th to early 19th century	The boundary stone has a rectangular plan and a rounded top, and it is roughly hewn.	II
Boundary stone on the south bank of Rising Brook; 52.75105°N 1.95710°W	—	Late 18th to early 19th century	The boundary stone has a rectangular plan and a rounded top. It is roughly hewn and there is a diagonal fissure on the west face.	II
Shrewsbury Arms Hotel and coach house 52.76091°N 1.93459°W		c. 1810	The public house, which may contain an earlier core, is stuccoed, and has a moulded cornice and a tile roof. There are two storeys and an attic, a main block of three bays, a later bay to the right, and a five-bay coach house with an archway on the left. In the centre of the main block is a projecting rusticated porch above which is a 19th-century inn sign. The windows are sashes, and there are three hip roofed dormers. The bay to the right contains a two-storey canted bay window and a sash window in the attic.	II
St Augustine's Church; 52.76437°N 1.93431°W		1822–23	The east end of the church was extended in about 1904. The church is built in stone with slate roofs, and has Perpendicular features. It consists of a nave with a clerestory, north and south aisles, a chancel with an organ chamber and vestry at the southeast and a north chapel, and a west tower. The tower has two stages, a Tudor arched west doorway, polygonal buttresses, and an embattled parapet. The east window has five lights and a crocketed ogee hood mould.	II*
Grotto; 52.75938°N 1.94254°W	—	Early 19th century	The grotto consists of a number of connected underground chambers carved out of natural red sandstone bedrock. It is entered through a roughcast portal, which leads to a rotunda with a colonnade of six Tuscan columns carrying an entablature and a dome, and through more chambers to a basilica containing a nave with an apse and aisles.	II
2 and 4 Church Street; 52.76396°N 1.93700°W	—	Early 19th century	Two houses at the end of a terrace in red brick with a slate roof. The left house has four bays under a gable, two storeys and an attic, and the right house has three bays and two storeys. Each house has a pedimented porch, and a doorway with a moulded surround and a rectangular fanlight. The windows are sashes with cornice hoods, some of them blocked, and at the left is a passageway.	II
17 Lower Brook Street; 52.75973°N 1.93563°W	—	Early 19th century	A stuccoed shop with three storeys, two bays, and a two-bay wing on the left. In ground floor are paired engraved pilasters at the sides, in the upper storeys are paired Ionic pilasters, the middle storey contains a cornice, and at the top are a plain frieze, a cornice, and a blocking course. In the centre of the ground floor is a modern shop front, and the windows are sashes with engraved surrounds, those in the top floor in moulded architraves.	II
19 Lower Brook Street; 52.75987°N 1.93560°W	—	Early 19th century	A stuccoed shop with side and intermediate pilasters in the upper storeys and a parapet. There are three storeys and five bays. The windows are sashes, and in the ground floor is a modern shop front.	II
Brook House; 52.75951°N 1.93500°W	—	Early 19th century	A red brick house with plain eaves and a slate roof. There are two storeys and three bays. The doorway has moulded stuccoed pilasters and a cornice hood on consoles, and the windows are sashes with channelled lintels.	II
32 Talbot Street; 52.75779°N 1.93268°W	—	Early to mid 19th century	A stuccoed house, the ground floor rusticated, with a band above the ground floor, a moulded cornice on paired consoles over the middle floor, and a tile roof. There are three storeys and three bays, the left bay recessed. The doorway in the left bay has a moulded surround, a semicircular head and a fanlight, and the windows are sashes in moulded architraves, those in the ground floor with semicircular heads.	II
Church of St Joseph and St Etheldreda; 52.75889°N 1.93306°W		1849–50	A Roman Catholic church designed by Charles Hansom in Decorated style, it is built in sandstone and has tile roofs. The church consists of a nave with a clerestory, north and south aisles, north and south porches, a chancel with a north Lady chapel and a south vestry, and a west steeple. The steeple has a tower with diagonal buttresses, a stair turret with a pinnacle, a trefoil balustrade with small pinnacles, a tall octagonal spire with lucarnes and flying buttresses, and a weathercock.	II
Vicarage; 52.76333°N 1.93824°W	—	c. 1850	The vicarage is in red brick, and has two storeys, four bays, and a single-storey wing with an embattled parapet on the right. The second bay projects and is gabled, and the windows are sashes. The doorway has a stuccoed surround, a rectangular fanlight, and a cornice hood on consoles.	II
Lloyds Bank; 52.75995°N 1.93583°W	—	Mid 19th century	The building is stuccoed, the ground floor rusticated, and above are moulded bands, a modillion eaves cornice, and a tile roof. The building has two storeys and eight bays. There are two doorways with moulded pilasters, one with a cornice hood on consoles, and the other with a semicircular head and a fanlight. The windows are sashes, and at the right end is an arched cover-way with a rusticated surround.	II
Brindley Bank Pumping Station; 52.77297°N 1.94507°W		1902–07	The water pumping station is in brick with terracotta dressings, it has a slate roof, and is in Tudor Revival style. There are two storeys, attics and cellars, and a T-shaped plan, with the engine house along the front, and the boiler house at the rear. The entrance front has seven bays, the fifth bay projecting and gabled. This bay contains a Tudor arched doorway and a hood mould incorporating a dated panel. The ground floor windows are mullioned and transomed, in the upper floor three of the bays contain four-light windows, and the others have diamond panels. At the top are three smaller gables containing slit windows, and all the gables have finials.	II*
Churchyard Cross; 52.76469°N 1.93559°W	—	Undated	The cross is in the churchyard of the old St Augustine's Church, it is in stone and consists of a plain shaft on a base and a step. At one corner of the base is a hollowed-out kneeling place.	II
Churchyard walls, piers and gates, St Augustine's Church; 52.76438°N 1.93485°W	—	Undated	A low stone wall with rounded copings runs along the west and south sides of the churchyard. At the entrance to the churchyard are four stone piers, a pair of wrought iron gates, and smaller gates flanking them.	II
Graveyard wall, Old St Augustine's Church; 52.76457°N 1.93487°W	—	Undated	A low stone wall running along the east side of the churchyard of the old St Augustine's Church.	II
