= John Allen (archdeacon of Salop) =

John Allen (25 May 1810 - 13 December 1886) was Archdeacon of Salop from 15 December 1847 until 23 March 1886.

Allen was born at Burton, Pembrokeshire where his father was the rector. He was educated at Westminster School and Trinity College, Cambridge. He was ordained in 1834 and became a Lecturer at King's College London. In 1846, he became Vicar of Prees, a post he held until 1883.

He shared a great-grandfather with Emma Darwin. Through his daughter Grace, he was the grandfather of Selwyn MacGregor Grier and Lynda Grier.
