= St Luke's Church, Cannock =

St Luke’s Church, Cannock
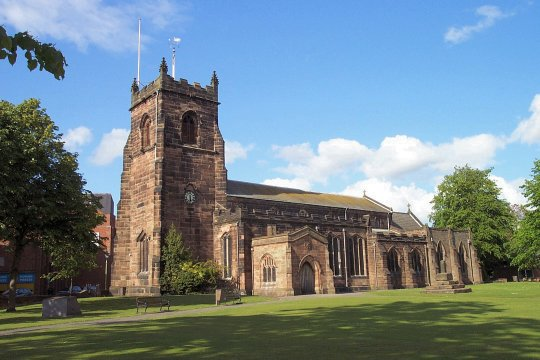
- St Luke’s Church, Cannock
- St Luke’s Church, Cannock
- 52°41′20.40″N 2°01′44.00″W
- OS grid reference: SJ 98144 10147
- Location: Cannock
- Country: England
- Denomination: Church of England

History
- Dedication: Luke the Evangelist

Architecture
- Heritage designation: Grade II* listed

Administration
- Diocese: Diocese of Lichfield
- Archdeaconry: Lichfield
- Deanery: Rugeley
- Parish: Cannock and Huntington

St Luke's Church, Cannock is a Grade II* listed parish church in Cannock, Staffordshire, England. It is an active place of worship and community hub in the town centre.

== History ==
St Luke's Church dates from the 12th century but was enlarged in the 14th century with the addition of nave arcades and the tower. It was extended again at the east end by Nicholas Joyce of Stafford between 1878 and 1882 who added two additional bays to the nave and aisles. A chapel of 1949 was built as a war memorial and the classical porch was replaced in 1957.

== Organ ==
The church has an organ which originally was built by Norman and Beard in 1914. A specification of the organ can be found on the National Pipe Organ Register.

== See also ==
- Grade II* listed buildings in Cannock Chase (district)
- Listed buildings in Cannock
