= Edward Charles Blount =

British banker and promoter of French railways (1809-1905)

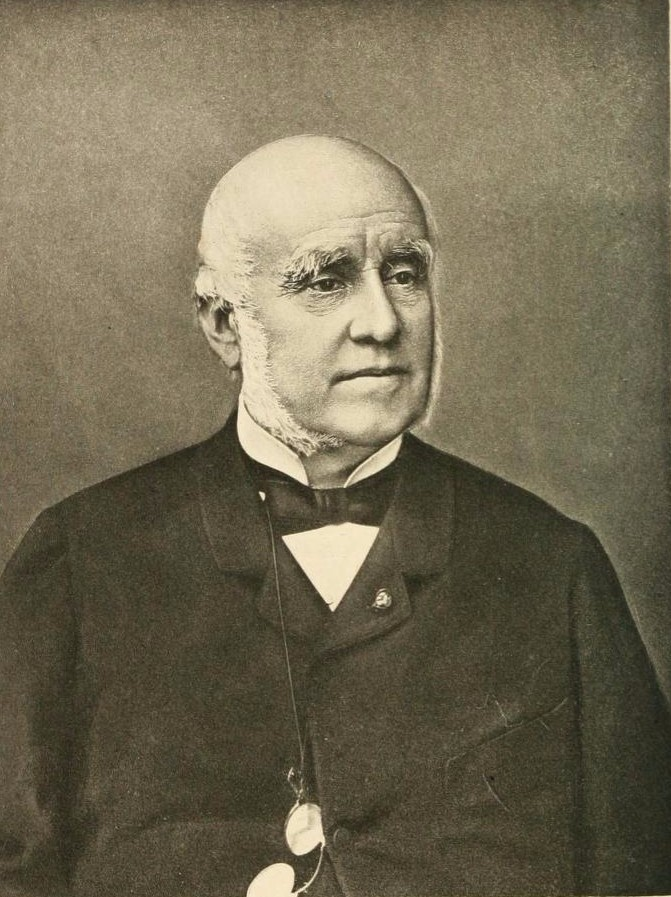
Edward Charles Blount

Sir Edward Charles Blount KCB (16 March 1809 – 15 March 1905) was an English banker in Paris and promoter of French railways.

== Early life ==
Born into a Catholic family at Bellamour, near Rugeley, Staffordshire, he was the second son of Edward Blount (1769–1843) and his wife, Frances (died 1859), daughter of Francis Wright of Fitzwalters, Essex. He had four brothers, none of whom married, the eldest being Walter Blount the herald. He was sent young to Rugeley Grammar School, where the local Anglican vicar was master, which at home he studied French with Father Malvoisin, an émigré Catholic priest. In 1819, he went to St Mary's College, Oscott, and stayed until 1827.

After a short time in the London office of the Provincial Bank of Ireland, he moved to the home office. Through his father he moved as a young man in Whig society, and sometimes attended breakfast parties at Holland House. In the autumn of 1829, Granville Leveson-Gower, 1st Earl Granville, British ambassador in Paris, appointed him attaché to the embassy; next year he was transferred to the consulate at Rome. At Rome he met Cardinal Weld and Cardinal Wiseman; and at the palace of Queen Hortense he first met her son, the future Napoleon III. In 1831 he left Rome to join the Paris banking firm of Callaghan & Co. With his father's help, he soon started the bank of Edward Blount, Père et Fils, at No. 7 Rue Laffitte. The business proved successful, and he afterwards joined Charles Laffitte, nephew of Jacques Laffitte, in forming Charles Laffitte, Blount & Co., Rue Basse du Rempart.

== Financing French railways ==
Blount concentrated on the promotion of railway enterprises in France, where in 1836 there was just one short line, between Strasbourg and Bâle. In 1838 a French government bill for the construction of seven major trunk-lines under the control of the state was defeated, and the way thrown open to private enterprise. Blount offered Jules Armand Dufaure, then minister of public works, to construct a jointly-financed line from Paris to Rouen; the proposal was accepted, and a company, the Chemin de fer de l'Ouest, was formed by Blount, who became chairman. Backers included James Rothschild and Lord Overstone, and the directors were half French and half English. The law authorising Blount's firm to construct the railway from Paris was signed by King Louis Philippe on 15 July 1840, and the line, designed by Joseph Locke with Thomas Brassey as contractor, was opened on 9 May 1843.

William Barber Buddicom, the locomotive manager of the London and North Western Railway at Liverpool, brought 50 English drivers to France, Blount himself learned engine-driving, and the line prospered from the first. Blount remained chairman for thirty years. With his partner, Laffitte, Blount next constructed in 1845 the line from Amiens to Boulogne by way of Abbeville and Neufchâtel-Hardelot. Subsequently (1852–53) he was administrator of the lines from Lyon to Avignon, and between Lyon, Mâcon and Geneva. He invested also in other European railways and projects.

== Third bank ==
Blount helped Louis Philippe's family escape the French Revolution of 1848. His bank failed, and while the creditors were eventually paid in full, he had to retire to St. Germains and retrench. With the aid of Brassey and other wealthy friends he started in the autumn of 1852 a third banking business, Edward Blount & Company at No. 7 Rue de la Paix. The venture prospered. Blount acted as banker to the Papal government. After the unification of Italy of 1859, and the annexation of the Papal States to the new kingdom, he took on the transfer of the financial liabilities of the Papal States to the new Italian government, and the conversion of the papal debt.

On the outbreak of revolution in Paris on 4 September 1870, and the foundation of the French Third Republic, Blount wound up the affairs of his bank and transferred the business to the Société Générale of Paris, of which he became president.

== The siege of Paris ==
When the Prussian forces threatened Paris, Blount sent his wife and family to England, but remained with his son Aston through the siege of Paris. Richard Lyons, 1st Viscount Lyons the British ambassador, left for Tours on 17 November and Blount took charge of British interests, being formally appointed British consul on 24 January 1871. During the siege he with Richard Wallace and Alan Herbert distributed relief aid from United Kingdom.

Blount dined with Otto von Bismarck at Versailles after the fall of the city, and left for London at the end of March 1871. Convinced that the British should have come to the rescue of France, he spoke his mind to W. E. Gladstone, the prime minister.

== Later life ==
For his services, Blount was made CB on 13 March 1871, becoming KCB (civil) on 2 June 1878. He was also a commander of the Légion d'Honneur.

In 1894 Blount resigned the chairmanship of the Chemin de fer de l'Ouest, at a time of xenophobia; his fellow directors elected him honorary president. He maintained a position in English and French society in Paris, and was for many years president of the British chamber of commerce there. His financial interests extended beyond France. He was a director among other ventures of the General Credit and Finance Company (afterwards the Union Discount Company of London) and of the London Joint Stock Bank.

Devoted to horse racing, Blount followed the stable of the Comte de Lagrange, and was a member of the French Jockey Club. The Comte died in 1883, and he then kept a small stable of his own.

In June 1901 Blount retired from the presidency of his banking concern, the Société Générale of Paris; leaving France, he was made honorary president. He then settled at his Sussex home, Imberhorne, East Grinstead. He died at East Grinstead on 15 March 1905, aged 96, and was buried in the family vault at the cemetery of St. Francis, Crawley, Sussex. He built a Catholic school near Birmingham, and a church at East Grinstead.

== Works ==
Blount dictated his memoirs to a neighbour, Stuart J. Reid, who published them in 1902. Blount was a surrealist amateur photomontagist. He created an album with hundreds of photo-montages which might be very revealing to a psychoanalyst.

== Family ==
On 18 November 1834, Blount married Gertrude Frances, third daughter of William Charles Jerningham. She died on 9 November 1907. Of their two sons and three daughters, he was survived only by his younger son, Henry Edmund Blount.
