= Ethelred Taunton =

Ethelred Luke Taunton (17 October 1857 – 9 May 1907) was an English Roman Catholic priest and historical writer.

== Life ==
Taunton was born at Rugeley, Staffordshire, England, the youngest son of Thomas Taunton of Rugeley, by his wife Mary, daughter of Colonel Clarke of the Royal Marines. Taunton was educated at Downside, and formed a desire to enter the Benedictine Order, but health was an obstacle. He studied music at Lichfield and became an accomplished organist. He then entered the Institute of St. Andrew, founded by the Catholic convert, George Bampfield, at Barnet; but again his health prevented him from remaining. Finally, he joined the Congregation of the Oblates of St. Charles founded by Cardinal Manning at Bayswater, and in 1883 he was ordained priest.

Three years later he was sent on the mission to the Church of Our Lady of Good Counsel in Stoke Newington in North London. Here he built a new temporary church, which was opened in 1888; but shortly afterwards he received serious injury by the accidental fall of some scaffolding, which brought on partial paralysis, and permanently incapacitated him from active work.

He continued, however, to be busy with his pen. He was a man of wide reading, and wrote on a large number of subjects. For a while he lived at Bruges where he founded and edited "St. Luke's Magazine"; but it had only a brief existence, and having partially recovered his health, he returned to England and devoted himself to literature.

His death took place somewhat suddenly, in London, from heart failure, at the age of fifty.

== Works ==
His two chief works were on the Jesuits and Benedictines; they were to have been followed by a similar one on the English secular clergy, had he lived. He always professed to aim at setting forth truth unadorned, but his partisan tone and apparent prejudice gave offence. He was also an authority on Church music and liturgy.

- "History of Church Music" (London, 1817);
- "Lead Kindly Light" (London, 1893);
- "English Black Monks of St. Benedict" (London, 1898);
- "History of the Jesuits in England" (London, 1901);
- "Thomas Wolsey" (London, 1901);
- "Little Office B.V.M." (London, 1903);
- "The Law of the Church" (London, 1906);

He wrote numerous articles in "Downside Review", "St. Luke's Magazine", "Irish Ecclesiastical Record", etc. He also translated Bacuez, "The Divine Office" (1886); and Bourdaloue, "The Lord's Prayer" (1894).
