= Grade II* listed buildings in Staffordshire =

Staffordshire shown within England

The county of Staffordshire is divided into nine districts: Tamworth, Lichfield, Cannock Chase, South Staffordshire, Stafford, Newcastle-under-Lyme, Staffordshire Moorlands, East Staffordshire, and Stoke-on-Trent.

As there are many Grade II* listed buildings in the county they have been split into separate lists for each district.

- Grade II* listed buildings in Cannock Chase (district)
- Grade II* listed buildings in East Staffordshire
- Grade II* listed buildings in Lichfield (district)
- Grade II* listed buildings in Newcastle-under-Lyme (borough)
- Grade II* listed buildings in South Staffordshire
- Grade II* listed buildings in Stafford (borough)
- Grade II* listed buildings in Staffordshire Moorlands
- Grade II* listed buildings in Stoke-on-Trent
- Grade II* listed buildings in Tamworth (borough)

== See also ==
- Grade I listed buildings in Staffordshire
- Category:Grade II* listed buildings in Staffordshire
