= Listed buildings in Cannock =

Cannock is a town and an unparished area in the district of Cannock Chase, Staffordshire, England. It contains 17 buildings that are recorded in the National Heritage List for England. Of these, three are listed at Grade II*, the middle grade, and the others are at Grade II, the lowest grade. The listed buildings include a church and associated structures, houses, shops, public houses, a former chapel and its manse, a conduit head, and a school.

== Key ==
Grade	Criteria
II*	Particularly important buildings of more than special interest
II	Buildings of national importance and special interest

== Buildings ==
Name and location	Photograph	Date	Notes	Grade
St Luke's Church; 52.68900°N 2.02897°W		12th century	Most of the church dates from the 14th century, it was restored and the east end was extended in 1878–82, the chapel was added in 1949 and the porch in 1957. The church is built in sandstone and has slate roofs. It consists of a nave, north and south aisles, a south porch, a chancel with a northeast vestry and a southeast chapel, and a west tower. The tower has three stages, diagonal buttresses, a three-light west window, a clock face on the south side, and an embattled parapet with corner pinnacles. The church is mainly Perpendicular in style, with the north aisle in Decorated style and containing some earlier fabric. There are embattled parapets on the body of the church and pinnacles on the north aisle.	II*
Wayside cross 52.68884°N 2.02905°W	—	14th century (probable)	The wayside cross in the churchyard of St Luke's Church. It is in sandstone, and consists of a small fragment of shaft on a graduated base.	II
79 High Green; 52.68947°N 2.03231°W		16th century (probable)	A house, later used for other purposes, it is in painted brick on a timber framed core, and has a tile roof. There are two storeys and attics, and three bays, the outer bays projecting and gabled with scalloped bargeboards. The doorway and windows are modern replacements. Inside there is some exposed timber framing.	II
Conduit head 52.68958°N 2.03187°W		1736	The building is in red sandstone, and has a pyramidal stone-flagged roof with a ball finial. It has two storeys, a hexagonal plan, and stands on a plinth. The building contains a low doorway with an opening above, and on the side is an inscribed plaque.	II
Cannock Mill; 52.68685°N 2.01894°W	—	18th century	The mill is in red brick with modillion eaves and a tile roof. There are three storeys, three bays, and a two-storey wing on the right. The doorway has a plain surround, and the windows are casements with cambered heads.	II
Council House; 52.68984°N 2.03194°W		Mid 18th century	The house, later used for other purposes, is stuccoed, with quoins, a moulded cornice, a parapet curving up at the ends, and a hipped tile roof. There are two storeys, five bays, and a recessed lower four-bay wing on the left. Steps lead up to the central doorway that has a moulded architrave and a triangular pediment. The windows are sashes, those in the upper floor with aprons.	II*
8 and 8A Mill Street; 52.68833°N 2.02814°W	—	Late 18th century	A roughcast shop with quoins, moulded stone eaves and a tile roof. There are two storeys and an attic, and three bays. In the ground floor are shop windows and a central doorway with a pedimented hood. The upper floor contains casement windows with channelled keyblocks, and there are three boxdormers.	II
10 Mill Street; 52.68838°N 2.02797°W	—	Late 18th century	A roughcast shop that has side pilasters with moulded caps, moulded eaves, and a tile roof. There are two storeys and an attic, and three bays. In the ground floor is a shop front that has a recessed central doorway with a moulded pedimented hood. The upper floor contains three-light casement windows with moulded keyblocks and aprons, the middle window is blind, and there are two hip roofed dormers.	II
Cannock Mill House; 52.68705°N 2.01902°W	—	Late 18th century (probable)	The house, to the north of the mill, is roughcast with brick modillion eaves, and a tile roof. There are three storeys, three bays, two doorways with plain surrounds, and sash windows with cambered heads.	II
Congregational chapel 52.69077°N 2.03240°W		1824	The former chapel, which was extended later in the 19th century, is in red brick with overhanging eaves and a Welsh slate roof, and is in Gothick style. It has a rectangular plan, a single storey, and a lean-to extension on the west. The east front has two bays, and contains two windows with moulded surrounds, pointed heads, hood moulds, and they contain Y-tracery. There are similar windows on the sides of the church, and in the gable is an inscribed tablet.	II
Manse; 52.69067°N 2.03245°W	—	c. 1824	The manse to the south of the chapel is in red brick and has a hipped slate roof. There are two storeys, a double-depth plan, and three bays. The central doorway has a moulded surround, a rectangular fanlight and a small canopy on console brackets, and the windows are sashes.	II
Railings and gates, St Luke's Church; 52.68831°N 2.02916°W	—	Late 18th to early 19th century	The railings and gates at the south entrance to the churchyard are in wrought iron. In the centre is a pair of gates, flanked by smaller gates. There are four gate posts in openwork wrought iron, each with a fluted domed cap and an urn finial.	II
71, 71A, 73 and 75 High Green; 52.68938°N 2.03202°W	—	Early 19th century	A row of three shops and a house, Nos. 71 and 71A are stuccoed, the others are in painted brick, with moulded eaves and a tile roof. There are two storeys and eight bays. No 71 is a house, and has a doorway with a moulded surround, pilasters, side lights and a cornice hood, and the windows are sashes; the others have shop fronts in the ground floor and the windows are replacements. There is an entry to the left of No. 73.	II
Wallhouse National School; 52.69225°N 2.04084°W	—	1828	The school consists of a central house and flanking school rooms, all stuccoed and with tile roofs. The house has two storeys, three bays, sash windows, and a hipped roof. In the centre is a projecting porch with a segmental-headed opening, a hood mould, and an inscribed plaque above, "WALHOUSE NATIONAL SCHOOL 1828". The school rooms are gabled, with a circular window in the gable, and a window below with a pointed head and a hood mould. Between the house and the school rooms are single-storey links with a doorway and a curved hood mould. Note that Historic England has incorrectly spelled Walhouse in its listings	II
77 and 79 High Green; 52.68940°N 2.03206°W	—	Mid 19th century	A pair of red brick houses, later used for other purposes, they have moulded stone eaves with consoles, a tile roof, and two storeys. No. 77 has two bays, a modern shop front, and to the right a round-headed doorway with a fanlight. No. 79 has three bays, in the centre is a doorway with Ionic pilasters, an arched head, and a keystone. The windows are sashes, those in the ground floor with cornice hoods on consoles.	II
Gates, railings end gate piers, Council House; 52.68968°N 2.03178°W	—	19th century	The ornate gates and railings at the front of the forecourt are in wrought iron, the railings on a low stone wall. At the ends are rusticated piers, each with a cornice cap and a ball finial.	II*
Crystal Fountain Public House; 52.68454°N 2.03288°W		1937	The public house is in brown brick, and has a coped parapet and a hipped pantile roof. There are two storeys and four bays. In the ground floor are three tall multipane windows in moulded architraves, the outer windows with scrolled keystones, and flanking them are doorways with architraves. The upper floor contains three three-light casement windows, flanked by circular windows, and at the rear is a loggia with round-headed arches.	II
