= St Joseph and St Etheldreda, Rugeley =

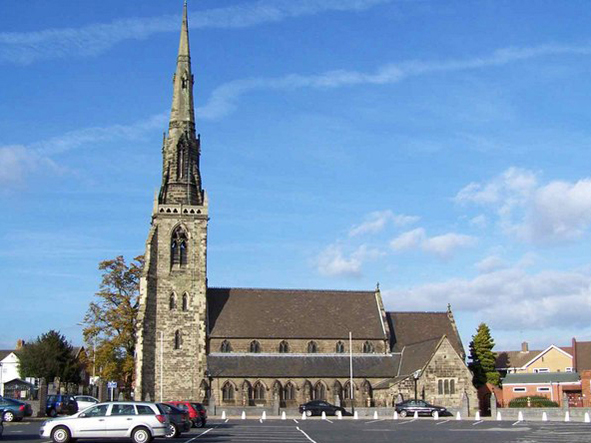
- St Joseph and St Etheldreda, Rugeley
- 52.758819°N 1.933519°W
- OS grid reference: SK 04615 17918
- Location: Lichfield Street, Rugeley, Staffordshire, England
- Country: England
- Denomination: Roman Catholic
- Website: www.rugeleycatholicchurch.co.uk

History
- Dedication: Saint Joseph and Saint Etheldreda
- Consecrated: June 1851

Architecture
- Functional status: Active
- Heritage designation: Grade II listed building
- Designated: 21 June 1995
- Architect: Charles Hansom
- Architectural type: Victorian Gothic
- Years built: 1849–50

Specifications
- Materials: Sandstone ashlar

Administration
- Province: Birmingham
- Archdiocese: Birmingham
- Parish: Rugeley

The Church of St Joseph and St Etheldreda is the Roman Catholic parish church of Rugeley, in Staffordshire, England. Built in 1849–50 in Victorian Gothic style, it is a Grade II listed building.

== Church ==
The church is a major work of Charles Hansom, built in 1849–50 in Victorian decorated style together with the presbytery; the steeple was added to the west tower in 1868. The nave has north and south aisles with a clerestory; at the east end there is a vestry on the south side and a Lady chapel, formerly used by the sisters of St Anthony's convent, on the north side. The approximately 75-foot (23 m) tower has diagonal buttresses, a stair turret with a pinnacle, and a trefoil balustrade with small pinnacles; the octagonal spire surmounting it has lucarnes and flying buttresses.

The east window depicting Saint Joseph and Saint Etheldreda is by Hardman & Co., with a central depiction of the Good Shepherd by William Wailes. The east window in the Lady chapel is also by Hardman and dates to 1860. The Caen stone and alabaster chapel altar was added in 1880, and the north window in the chapel is a memorial to Joseph Whitgreave (d. 1885), who endowed the church with his sister, Etheldreda, and depicts them at the base offering the church to God. Beginning in 1938, the original wall decorations in the nave and chancel were painted over and some of the church furnishings, including some of the statues and a 1930 pulpit that was a war memorial, were removed. The Stations of the Cross date to 1951. An interior renovation in 2010–13 included new sanctuary furnishings and wall decorations based on the originals.

The material of the church is Beaudesert sandstone, much of it laid with the grain for cost reasons, and has required many repairs. During repairs to the tower in the 1930s, a spirelet with a diadem of St Etheldreda was removed from the top of the stair turret and the pinnacles were removed from the centre of each balustrade; funds were insufficient for these details to be replaced.

The church was Grade II listed on 21 June 1995.

Since the demolition of Rugeley power station, the church's spire has been the tallest structure in the town; at approximately 160 feet (49 m) to the top of the weathercock, it is widely visible from the surrounding settlements and hills.

== See also ==
- Listed buildings in Rugeley
