= Rugeley Town Hall =

Municipal building in Rugeley, Staffordshire, England

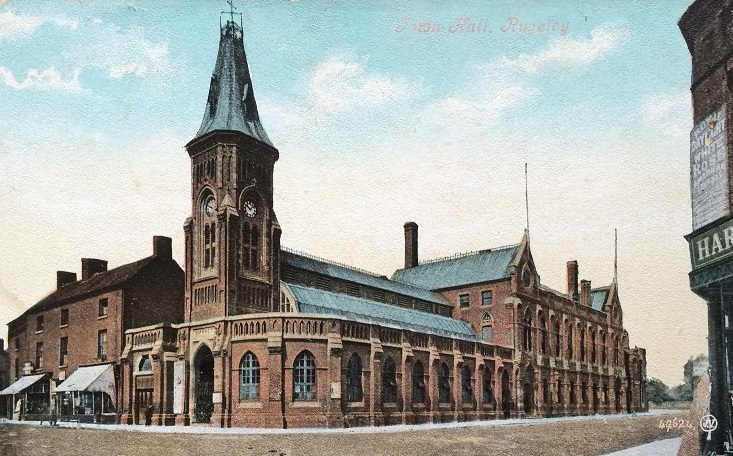
- Rugeley Town Hall

- Shown in Staffordshire
- 52.7608°N 1.9354°W
- Location: Market Square, Rugeley

History
- Built: 1879

Site notes
- Architect: William Tadman-Foulkes
- Architectural style: Gothic Revival style

Rugeley Town Hall was a municipal building in the Market Square in Rugeley, Staffordshire, England. The building, which was the headquarters of Rugeley Urban District Council, was demolished in 1978.

== History ==
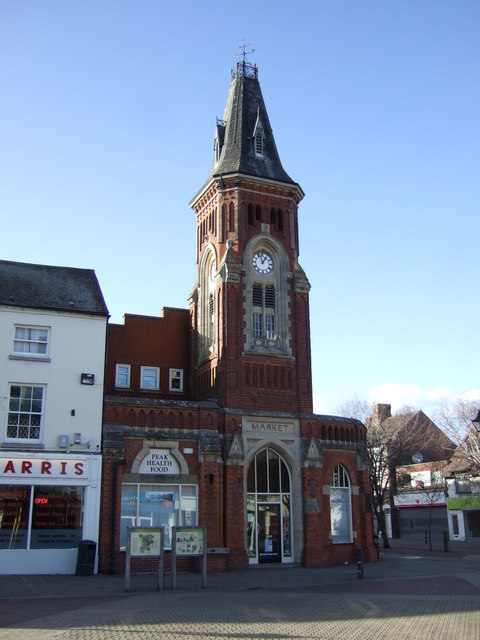
The clock tower which is the only remaining part of the town hall

The first municipal building in the town was a town hall which stood in the centre of the Market Square and was completed in around 1790. It was arcaded on the ground floor so that markets could be held, with an assembly room on the first floor and a cupola on the roof. The building, which was extended to the north in the Tudor style in 1850, was the venue for the inquest into the death of John Parsons Cook who was murdered by Dr William Palmer in 1855.

In the early 1870s the magistrates complained about the "disgraceful and dangerous state of the building" which had become very dilapidated. The lord of the manor, Thomas Anson, 2nd Earl of Lichfield, whose seat was at Shugborough Hall, offered to provide a site for a new building.

The foundation stone for the new building was laid by the Earl of Lichfield on 26 June 1878. It was designed by William Tadman-Foulkes in the Gothic Revival style, built in red brick with stone dressings and was completed in 1879. The design involved an asymmetrical main frontage with three bays facing onto the Market Square; the central bay featured a clock tower with an arched doorway on the ground floor and a tall section with louvres and clock faces all surmounted by a spire; on the right, the building curved round into Anson Street to form a single-storey section which was fenestrated by arched windows and surmounted by a parapet. Beyond that there was a two-storey-section which was fenestrated by arched windows and featured gabled end-bays, and, at the north end, there was a section which was formed by the reconstruction of the mid-19th century extension to the original town hall. Internally, the principal rooms were the market hall on the ground floor and the assembly rooms and municipal offices on the first floor.

Following significant population growth, largely associated with the mining industry, the area became an urban district with the town hall as its headquarters in 1894. One of the first acts of the new council was to implement a public water supply and a plaque was subsequently placed on the wall of the town hall to commemorate this innovation which was completed in 1895.

A war memorial, in the form of an obelisk, which was intended to commemorate the lives of local service personnel who had died in the First World War, was unveiled by the Lord Lieutenant of Staffordshire, William Legge, 6th Earl of Dartmouth, on the Anson Street side of the building on 23 January 1921. During the Second World War, the town was protected the Home Guard and, once fully-raised and efficient, two companies of the 14th (Stafford) Battalion Staffordshire Home Guard marched past a saluting base outside the town hall.

The building continued to serve as the headquarters of the urban district council for much of the 20th century, but ceased to be local seat of government when the enlarged Cannock Chase District Council was formed in 1974. Despite the objections of a local protest group, the new council instructed the demolition of the building in 1978.
