= St Augustine of Canterbury, Rugeley =

Old Chancel, Rugeley
- St Augustine of Canterbury, Rugeley
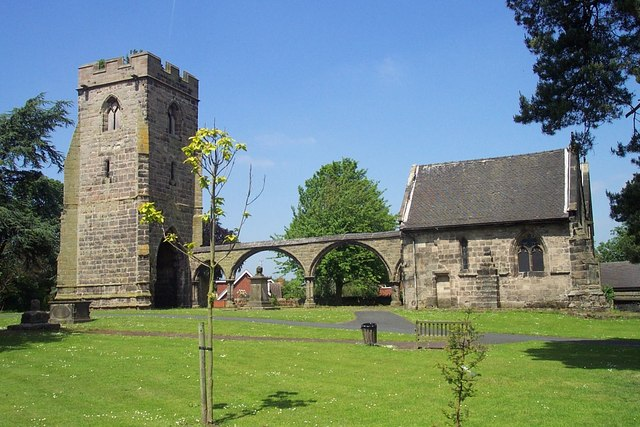
- Old Chancel, Rugeley
- Old Chancel, Rugeley
- 52.764419°N 1.934779°W
- OS grid reference: SK 04462 18580
- Location: Rugeley, Staffordshire,
- Country: England
- Previous denomination: Church of England

History
- Status: Declared redundant
- Founded: 10th century
- Dedication: St Augustine of Canterbury

Architecture
- Functional status: Tourist attraction
- Heritage designation: Grade II listed
- Designated: 5 July 1972
- Architectural type: Medieval church
- Style: Norman, Early English
- Completed: 14th century
- Closed: 1822
- Demolished: 1820s (partial)

St Augustine of Canterbury Church is the former parish church of the town of Rugeley in Cannock Chase District, Staffordshire, England. It is a grade II listed building parts of which date to the 12th century. In the early 19th century, it was replaced by St Augustine's Church across the road, and it is now partially ruined and known as "the Old Chancel".

== History ==
The site, north of the present town centre, is believed to have had a church since the 10th century. The church now known as the Old Chancel was built in the 12th century as a simple nave and chancel. In the 13th century a lady chapel was added, and later an Early English tower and a north aisle.

By the early 19th century, the church was too small for its growing congregation, and it was declared redundant and replaced by a new St Augustine's church across the road, built in 1822–23. The old church was partially demolished and material from it sold to assist with the costs of building the new church.

== Present condition ==
The tower, chancel, lady chapel, and a four-bay nave arcade survive and were grade II listed on 5 July 1972. The chancel and lady chapel have been restored and used for Sunday school. The chancel retains a late 13th-century window and a lancet window with medieval glass; the east window was replaced in the late 19th century with a window by C. E. Kempe. The arcade is 13th-century; the three western bays, which are somewhat later than the easternmost, are surmounted by quatrefoil piers.

Monuments in the church date to the 16th, 17th and 18th centuries, many to the Weston family and some to the Landor family; several of these were moved to the lady chapel before the demolition of the nave. In the churchyard east of the chancel, the joint table tomb of sisters Elizabeth Cuting (d. 1695) and Emma Hollinhurst (d. 1696) has carved effigies of the sisters tied in shrouds, in memory of their decision to be buried in linen rather than wool, in defiance of the law. These gave rise to a legend that they had been buried alive in sacks on the orders of Oliver Cromwell. The monument is Grade II listed. The churchyard has been cleared and the stones used to pave the site of the nave and north aisle; the remains of a late 14th-century cross are still in place.

== See also ==
- Listed buildings in Rugeley
