= Selwyn MacGregor Grier =

British colonial administrator

Sir Selwyn Macgregor Grier KCMG (1 April 1878 – 8 November 1946) was a British colonial administrator, Governor-in-Chief of the Windward Islands from 1935 to 1937.

He was the eldest child of Richard Macgregor Grier (1835 – 1894), the then rural dean of Rugeley and prebendary of Lichfield, and his wife, Grace Allen, daughter of John Allen, archdeacon of Shropshire. His sister, Lynda Grier, was a British educational administrator, and the principal of Lady Margaret Hall, Oxford, from 1921 to 1945. He was educated at Marlborough College and Pembroke College, Cambridge.

He taught for a year at Berkhamsted School in 1901-02 and at Cheam School from 1902 to 1905. He then joined the Colonial Service and went out to Nigeria as Assistant Resident in Zaria Province in 1906, being later transferred to Bauchi in 1912 and to Ibadan in 1913. From 1921 to 1925 he served as Secretary for Native Affairs and in 1925 was appointed Director of Education of the Southern Provinces. He was one of the founding fathers of Government College, Ibadan.

In 1929 he was transferred to the Caribbean as Colonial Secretary for Trinidad and Tobago. In 1935 he was appointed Governor of the Windward Islands but obliged to resign in 1937 due to blindness.

He was awarded the CMG in 1929, made a Knight Bachelor in 1934 and upgraded to KCMG in 1936.

Grier returned to England and died in Surrey on the 8 November 1946.
