= St Augustine's Church, Rugeley =

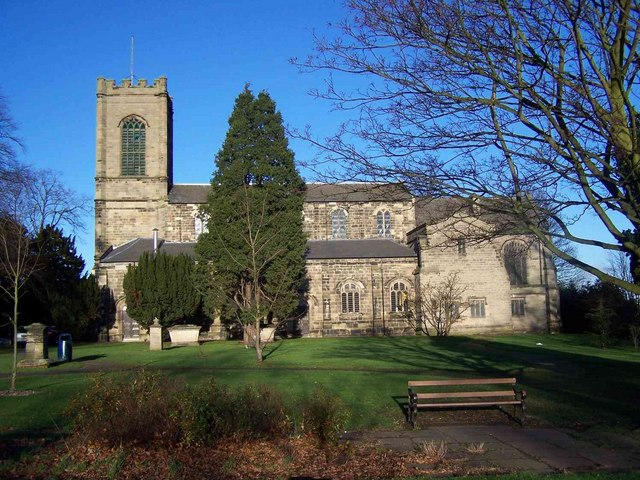
- St Augustine's Church, Rugeley
- St Augustine's Church, Rugeley
- 52.764419°N 1.934779°W
- OS grid reference: SK 04526 18524
- Location: Rugeley, Staffordshire,
- Country: England
- Denomination: Church of England
- Website: rugeleycofechurches.org/st-as

History
- Status: Active
- Dedication: St Augustine of Canterbury
- Consecrated: 1823

Architecture
- Functional status: Active
- Heritage designation: Grade II* listed
- Designated: 5 July 1972
- Architects: H. J. Underwood; Frank L. Pearson
- Style: Victorian Gothic

Administration
- Diocese: Diocese of Lichfield
- Archdeaconry: Lichfield
- Deanery: Rugeley
- Parish: Cannock and Huntington

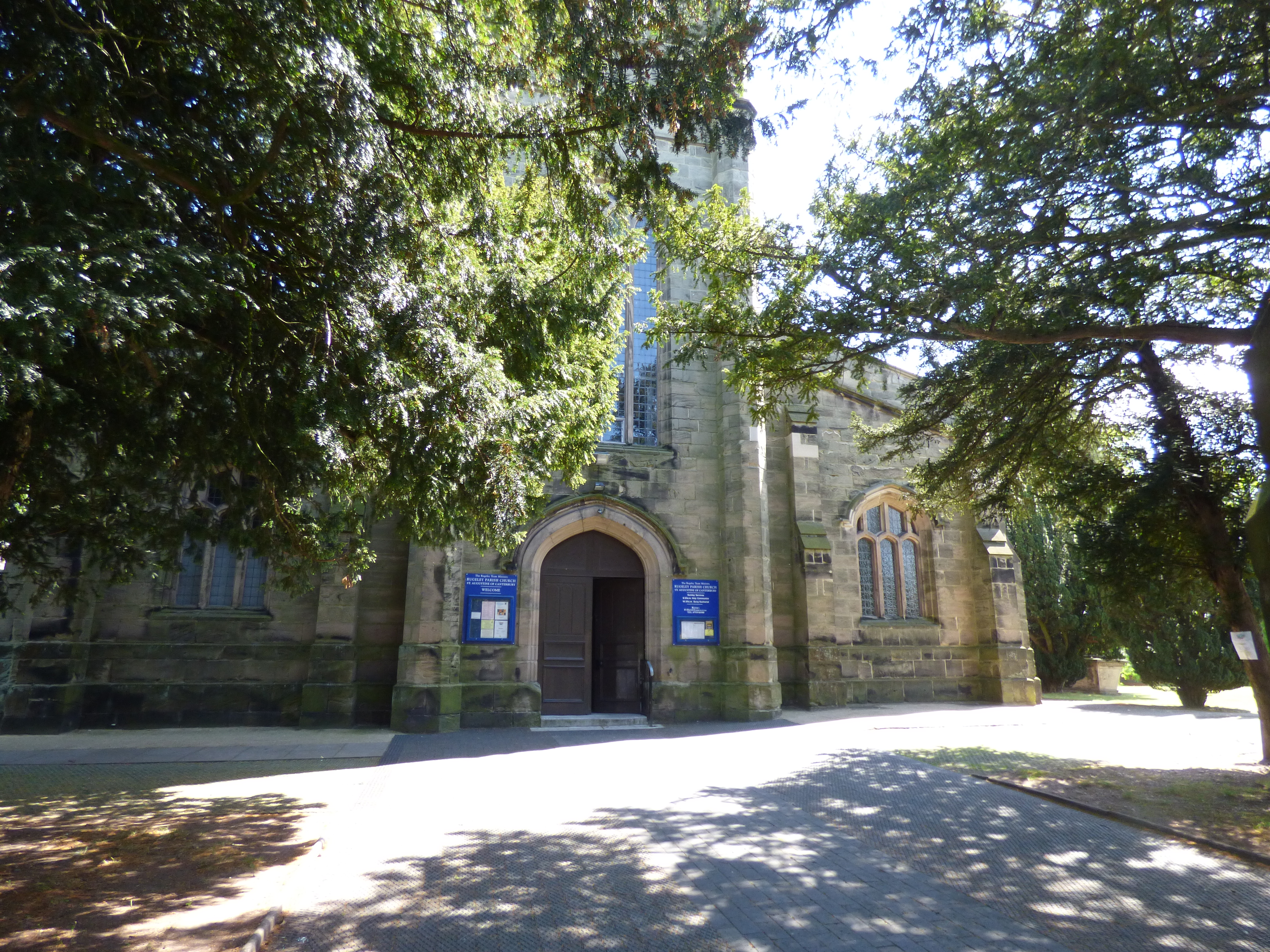
West end

St Augustine's Church is the parish church of Rugeley in Cannock Chase District, Staffordshire, England. Located north of the town centre, it was consecrated in 1823 as a replacement for the medieval St Augustine's church, now partially ruined, and was subsequently extended. It is a Grade II* listed building.

== History ==
St. Augustine's Church was built in 1822–23 to replace the medieval parish church dedicated to St Augustine of Canterbury, which had become too small for the growing population of the town. A site across the street was provided by the First Earl of Lichfield. The building was designed by H. J. Underwood and cost £6,501, some of which was later defrayed by partially demolishing the old church and selling materials from it. A chancel designed by Frank L. Pearson was added c. 1904 to accommodate a choir and a larger altar.

The church was Grade II* listed on 5 July 1972. The remnant of the old church was Grade II listed on the same day.

== Church ==
St Augustine's is built of ashlar. It is an early work by Underwood, in simplified Perpendicular style with a tall battlemented tower with Tudor-arched windows and door; the doors on the South side also have Tudor arches. It is an early example of a large Gothic revival church with galleries. The chancel and adjoining vestry and organ chamber by Pearson are also Perpendicular; the East window has stained glass by C. E. Kempe.

The churchyard has been cleared.

== See also ==
- Grade II* listed buildings in Staffordshire
- Listed buildings in Rugeley
