= Spens Report =

1938 British government report on secondary schools in the UK

The Spens Report was an important 1938 British government report on secondary schools in the UK which led to much-wider expansion of grammar schools in the UK, and the introduction of technical schools and "modern" schools (also known as secondary moderns). From this report, all people would go to a secondary school.

== History ==
The full title of the report was Secondary Education with special reference to Grammar Schools and Technical High Schools. The report was produced by Sir Will Spens CBE, the Master from 1927-52 of Corpus Christi College, Cambridge.

At the time of the report, around 5% of the British secondary school population would go on to university, but 50% of those at public school attended university.

=== Committees ===
The Spens Committee was given its task in the autumn of 1933. It sat for 76 days and examined 150 witnesses. Sub-committees sat for another 36 days. Sub-committees were set up to look into the grammar school curriculum in March 1935, and a drafting committee in February 1936. A Code Committee looked at the 1926 Hadow Report of Sir William Henry Hadow CBE, and how work from that would report would be included into the Spens Report. What was discussed in each committee, which would have a significant effect on British secondary education, and the committee's findings was dependent on the type of people, and their backgrounds, on each committee and who had appointed them.

== Content ==
The Report was published on Friday 30 December 1938 by the Consultative Committee of the Board of Education. It concluded that "the existing arrangements for the whole-time education of boys and girls in England and Wales have ceased to correspond with the actual structure of modern society and with the economic facts of the situation".

The report was long and covered many areas, not just the implementation of grammar schools and technical schools.

- It advocated the raising of the school age to 16, when financially possible. This was trialed in the 1944 Butler Education Act, but would not be implemented until September 1972. The 1936 Education Act had raised the leaving age (RSLA or ROSLA) to 15 from 1 September 1939, but this had been postponed. The 1964 Labour government planned to raise it to 16, but was prevented for economic reasons in 1968. When it was introduced in the early 1970s, the National Association of Schoolmasters forecast increased truancy, hooliganism and classroom revolt and opposed its introduction.
- It proposed that the envisaged diverse secondary education system should maintain parity of conditions between the three types of school - modern, technical and grammar.
- It advocated the abolition of school fees.

== Effect ==
The most well known, although not immediate, effect of the report was the Education Act 1944, known as the Butler Act after the President of the Board of Education, Rab Butler (later Lord Butler of Saffron Walden). This largely implemented main portions of the Spens Report.

A subsequent report in 1943, the Norwood Report of Sir Cyril Norwood, advocated grammar, technical and secondary modern schools.

== See also ==
- Another Spens Report in 1948 was conducted into the differential pay grades for doctors and dentists for the new NHS.
