= Ford Green Hall =

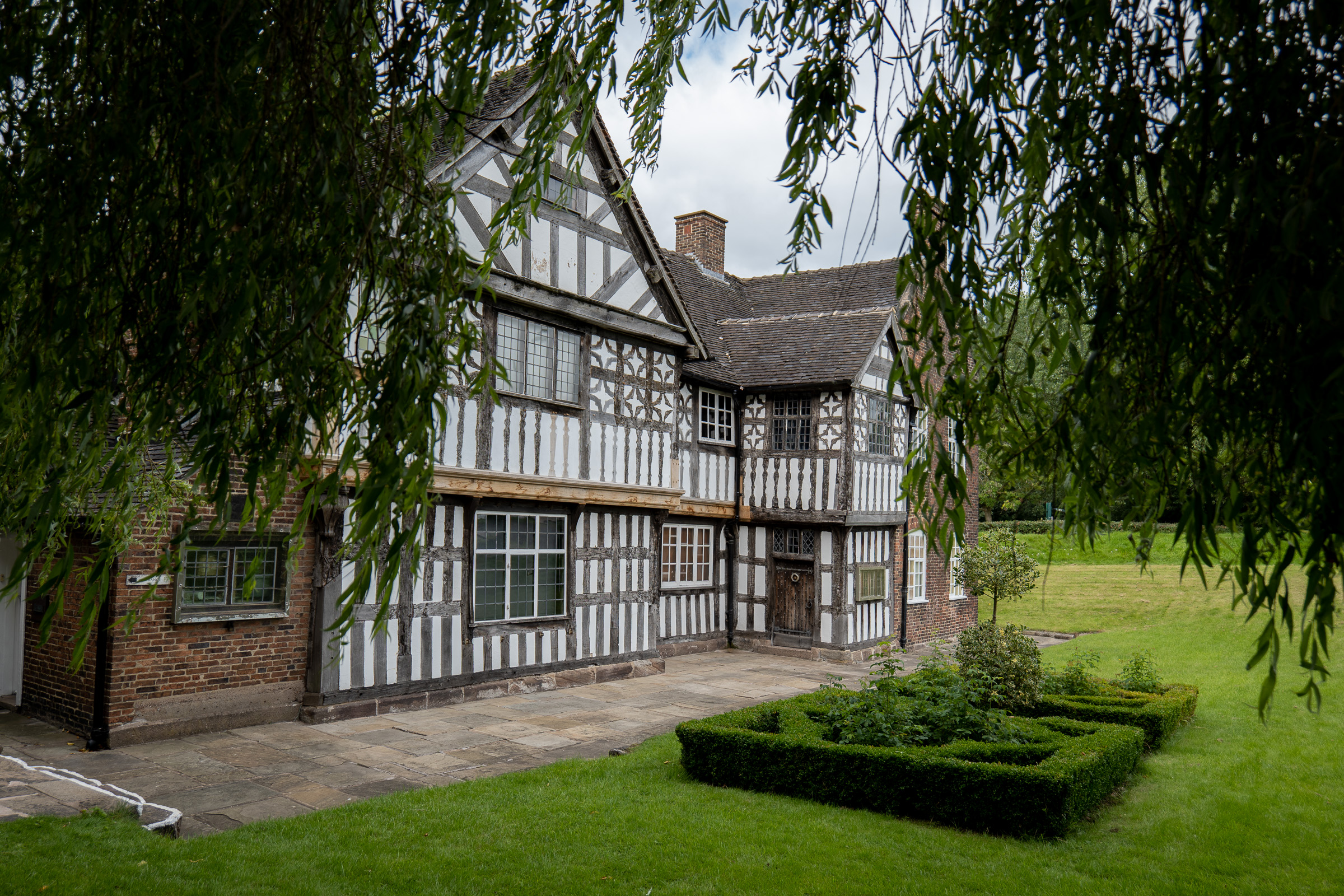
- Ford Green Hall

- Location within Staffordshire
- 53°3′18″N 2°10′10″W
- Location: Stoke-on-Trent, Staffordshire, England
- OS grid reference: SJ 8873 5086

History
- Built: 1624

Site notes
- Governing body: Stoke-on-Trent City Council

Listed Building – Grade II*
- Designated: 2 October 1951
- Reference no.: 1220313

Ford Green Hall is a Grade II* listed farmhouse and historic house museum in Stoke-on-Trent, Staffordshire. The oldest parts of the house date from the late 16th century, with one wing being either added or greatly repaired at some point in the early 18th century. In its grounds, there also stands an 18th-century dovecote which shares the listed building status of the main farmhouse.

The house stands on land adjacent to the B5051 minor road in the east of Smallthorne. Originally, it stood in 36 acres (150,000 m^{2}) of farmland, but this has been gradually encroached upon over the years so that now it is surrounded by comparatively small grounds. Beyond its grounds there is now housing and a nature reserve.

Journalists often confuse the Hall with the arson-hit Ford Green House. The House is the city's oldest home and also in Smallthorne, but it is not the same as the Hall.

== History ==
The hall is thought to have been built in 1624 for Hugh Ford, a local yeoman farmer, remaining in the Ford family for some 200 years. A brickwork extension was added to the property sometime in the 17th century, most likely replacing or renovating a previous structure.

The Fords had left the area by the 19th century, and after a series of tenants, it was split into three separate dwellings. During this period, the distinctive timber framing was covered in white stucco.

=== Use as a museum ===
The property was purchased by Stoke-on-Trent City Council in 1946 and, following restoration, opened as a museum in 1952. Ford Green Hall has been furnished as a 17th-century yeoman farmer's house. The museum includes a number of original textiles, ceramics and pieces of furniture, as well as some reproductions. The whole of the museum's collection is "Designated Outstanding" by the Arts Council England, recognising it as of world class importance.

There is an onsite café and the hall also holds a licence for weddings.

Following budget cutbacks by Stoke-on-Trent City Council in 2011, the museum was faced with closure. However, in early 2014, a deal was finalised to pass the management over to Ford Green Hall Ltd, a charitable organisation led by local volunteers.

The timber framing needed to be repaired in the 21st century, and the building was temporarily on the "Heritage at Risk Register".

== Architecture ==
=== Exterior ===
The house a mixture of 16th-century timber framing and 18th-century brickwork. The right-hand wing, built in the early 16th century, features black-and-white timber framing decorated with lozenge panels and balustrading. This older wing contains both two- and three-light mullioned windows, and a two-storey gabled porch. On a beam above the inner door of the porch is the inscription ""Ralph Sutton, Carpenter".

The left-hand wing is built of brick and was likely constructed sometime in the early 18th century. This wing was either constructed as replacement for an earlier structure or as a major overhaul of an already existing building. A rainwater head possibly dates this section of the building to 1734.

=== Interior ===
The interior doors of the house has moulded gothic, or ogival, archways, decorated with fleur-de-lys detailing. The staircase is believed to either be original to the house or an early 17th-century replacement and features decorative balusters and newel posts with acorn-shaped caps.

=== Dovecote ===
The hall features an early 18th-century brickwork dovecote. The dovecote is attached to the house by a small, brick wall and is a square-on-plan structure with a plain tiled roof. The English Heritage listing includes the attached dovecote as part of the buildings grade II* status.
