= Rugeley power stations =

Series of two former coal-fired power stations

The Rugeley power stations were a series of two coal-fired power stations located on the River Trent at Rugeley in Staffordshire. The first power station on the site, Rugeley A power station was opened in 1961, but has since been closed and demolished. Rugeley B power station was commissioned in 1970, and closed on 8 June 2016. The cooling towers of which were demolished on 6 June 2021. It had an output of 1,000 megawatts (MW) and had a 400 kilovolt (kV) connection to the national grid. The B station provided enough electricity to power roughly half a million homes.

== Rugeley A (1961–1995) ==
Rugeley power station A
- Country: England
- Location: Rugeley
- Status: Closed
- Construction began: 1956
- Commission date: 1961
- Decommission date: 1995
- Operators: Central Electricity Generating Board (1961–1990); National Power (1990–1995)

Thermal power station
- Primary fuel: Coal

Power generation
- Nameplate capacity: 600 MW

External links
- Commons: Related media on Commons

=== History ===
Construction of the A station started in 1956. The station's generating sets were commissioned between 1961 and 1962. The station was the first joint venture between the Central Electricity Generating Board (CEGB) and the National Coal Board (NCB). The station took coal directly from the neighbouring Lea Hall Colliery by conveyor belt. This was the first such arrangement in Britain. The colliery was put into production some 6 months before the first generating unit was commissioned in the power station. The station was originally planned to use 4 x 60MW turbo alternators but was amended initially to 2 x 120MW sets in 1956 as that size had significant economic benefits over a 60MW unit. The station was officially opened on 1 October 1963 by Lord Robens of Woldingham and Sir Christopher Hinton.

The first of the five cooling towers to be completed at Rugeley in 1960 was the world's first large dry cooling tower and the first large scale experiment with a design aimed at eliminating water loss. The dry tower was commissioned in 1962 but its capital and operating costs were considerably higher than a conventional wet tower. No further dry towers were constructed in the UK. On occasions this tower was used by the RAF for parachute development. Rugeley A was also the first power station in Britain to be controlled entirely from a central control room. The total cost of building it was £30 million.

=== Design and specification ===
The station had five 120 MW generating sets which gave it a generating capacity of 600 megawatts (MW). The boilers operated on pulverised coal and delivered 540 kg/s of steam at 103.4 bar and 538 °C. Rugeley A was one of the CEGB's twenty steam power stations with the highest thermal efficiency; in 1963–4 the thermal efficiency was 33.34 per cent, 31.75 per cent in 1964–5, and 31.42 per cent in 1965–6. In 1980–1 the station sent out 2,612.838 GWh, the thermal efficiency was 29.56 per cent. The annual electricity output of Rugeley A was:

Electricity output of Rugeley A
Year	1960–1	1961–2	1962–3	1963–4	1964–5	1965–6	1966–7	1971–2	1978–9	1980–1	1981–2
Electricity supplied, GWh	119.2	1,379.2	2,873.1	3,361	3,058	2,953	3,309	2,544	2,633.9	2,612.8	2,433
Thermal efficiency, %	31.12	32.81	33.01	33.34	31.75	31.42	31.75	30.54	30.08	29.56	30.94

=== Closure ===
The closure of the A station began in 1994 with units 1 & 4 being decommissioned with the other three following in 1995. Having burned nearly 42 million tonnes of coal in its lifetime, the station was demolished later in 1996.

==== Statistics at closure ====
	First ran	Closing date	Total run (hours)	Total starts	Total generation (GWh)
Unit 1	1961	1994	196,049	3,719 (3,260 hot, 459 cold)	20,097
Unit 2	1961	1995	180,781	4,948 (4,577 hot, 371 cold)	18,882
Unit 3	1961	1995	154,621	4,220 (3,701 hot, 519 cold)	15,912
Unit 4	1962	1994	169,201	4,404 (3,997 hot, 407 cold)	17,526
Unit 5	1962	1995	168,670	3,817 (3,420 hot, 397 cold)	17,261

Total coal burnt during lifetime: 41,869,969 tonnes

== Rugeley B (1970–2016) ==
Rugeley B Power Station
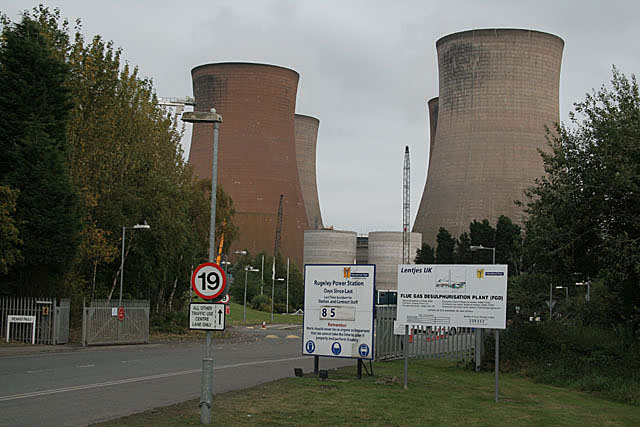
- Rugeley B power station entrance in September 2007
- Country: England
- Location: Rugeley
- Coordinates: 52.756°N 1.916°W
- Status: Decommissioned
- Construction began: 1964
- Commission date: 1970
- Decommission date: 8 June 2016
- Owner: Engie
- Operators: Central Electricity Generating Board (1970–1990); National Power (1990–2000); International Power (2000–2016)

Thermal power station
- Primary fuel: Coal

Power generation
- Nameplate capacity: 1,000 MW

External links
- Website: www.rugeleypower.com
- Commons: Related media on Commons

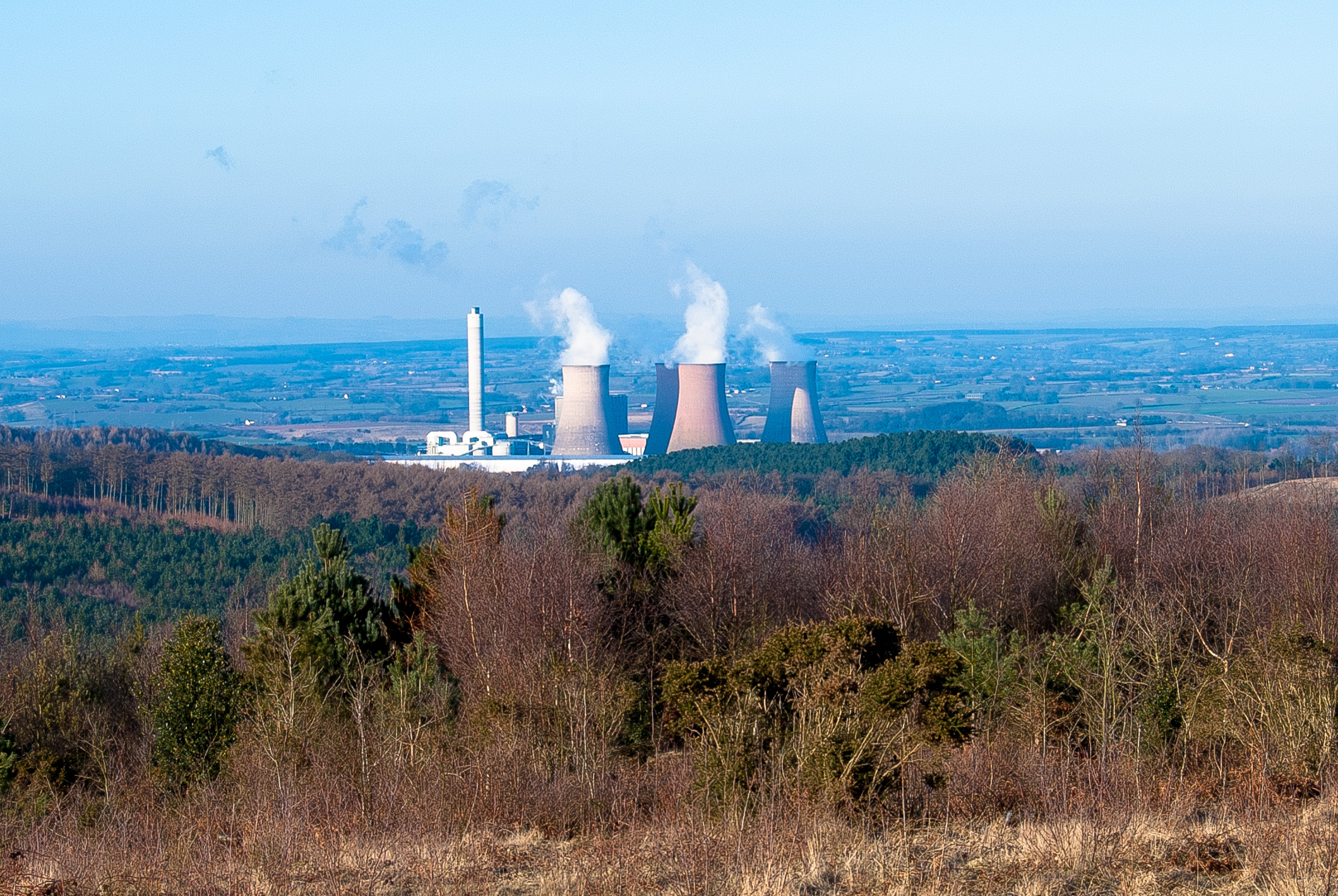
Rugeley B Power Station viewed from Cannock Chase in 2010

=== History ===
Construction of Rugeley B power station began in 1964, with completion of the station in 1970. The architects were L. K. Watson and H. J. Coates. The architects coloured two of the four cooling towers a pinkish red colour to heighten what they saw as the femininity of the hyperbolic form. With both stations in operation, 850 people were employed at the stations in 1983.

The two stations were initially operated by the Central Electricity Generating Board, but following privatisation in 1990, were handed over to National Power. The Lea Hall colliery was closed on 24 January 1991, meaning all coal burned in the stations needed to be delivered by rail. Rugeley B was supplied with fuel via branch off the adjacent Cannock and Rugeley railway line, near to its connection with the West Coast Main Line. Rail facilities included a west-facing junction on the Rugeley line, A and B sidings, gross-weight and tare-weight weighbridges, a hopper house, an oil siding, a hopper bypass line and a run-round loop.

In July 1996 the Rugeley B power station was bought by Eastern Generation, itself acquired by TXU Europe. Rugeley B was subsequently sold to International Power plc in July 2001. It remains under the same ownership, though International Power later merged with GDF Suez in 2011.

Construction of a flue-gas desulfurization plant started in early 2007 and it was commissioned at the B station in 2009. This allowed the station to comply with environmental legislation in force at the time and continue generating electricity. As well as FGD, a new chimney stack was built and attached to the plant due to the original chimney having a major issue where it was rocking in high winds and a concern it was going to collapse. The original chimney was decommissioned and demolished in 2006, then the new one alongside the FGD plant was commissioned in 2009.

In March 2012 Rugeley Power Ltd announced it would be considering a conversion to run using biomass fuel. In December 2013, Rugeley Power Ltd said they have scrapped the proposed biomass conversion. In 2014, there were 146 people employed at the station.

=== Design and specification ===
The Rugeley B station used two 500 MW generating sets, which could produce 8,760,000 MWh each year. The station usually burned 1.6 million tonnes of coal a year, producing 240,000 tonnes of ash. The station's boilers produced 1,100 tonnes of steam per hour, at a temperature of 568 °C. In 1980–1 the station sent out 6,724.920 GWh, the thermal efficiency was 35.47 per cent. Rugeley B also had two gas turbine generators installed, each of 25 MW capacity, which were used for emergency unit starts or could generate direct to the grid when required. It closed in 2016, as a result of a deterioration of market conditions. Thirty of the 150 staff remained to decommission the plant over three years.

The Rugeley B Station chimney was 600 ft (183m) in height, each of the four remaining cooling towers were 380 ft (114m) and main boiler/generator house was 245 ft (74m) high.

=== Closure and demolition ===
Demolition of the cooling towers in June 2021

In February 2016 it was announced that the power station would close in the summer of 2016. An announcement by owners, Engie blamed a deterioration in market conditions which included a fall in market prices and increasing carbon costs. The closure resulted in the loss of 150 jobs.

Rugeley Power Station ceased all operations on Wednesday 8 June 2016. Decommissioning began in June 2016. A total of 6 blowdown demolitions took place for the removal of the turbine hall and boiler house in several phases between November 2019 and August 2020. The 600 ft chimney was demolished on 24 January 2021 at 8:32am. The four cooling towers were demolished on 6 June 2021 at 11:25am. The site of the former station is expected to become a residential area.

==== Statistics at closure ====
	First ran	Last run	Total run (hours)	Total starts	Total generation (GWh)
Unit 6	09/01/1970	08/06/2016	285,595	2,764 (2313 hot, 451 cold)	125,776
Unit 7	15/10/1970	30/12/2015	125,776	2,705 (2318 hot, 387 cold)	123,501
