= Rugeley =

Town in Staffordshire, England

Coordinates: 52.7599°N 1.9388°W

- Town
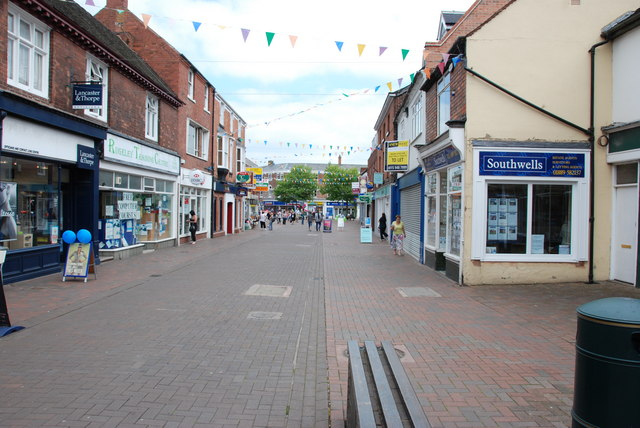
- Upper Brook Street, leading into Rugeley town centre

- Location within Staffordshire
- Population: 26,156 (2021 Census)
- OS grid reference: SK042180
- District: Cannock Chase
- Shire county: Staffordshire
- Region: West Midlands
- Country: England
- Sovereign state: United Kingdom
- Areas of the town (2011 census BUASD): List: Brereton; Brereton Cross; Breretonhill; Etchinghill; Ravenhill; Slitting Mill
- Post town: RUGELEY
- Postcode district: WS15
- Dialling code: 01889
- Police: Staffordshire
- Fire: Staffordshire
- Ambulance: West Midlands
- UK Parliament: Cannock Chase

Rugeley (/ˈruːdʒli/ ROOJ-lee) is a market town and civil parish in the Cannock Chase District, in Staffordshire, England. It lies on the north-eastern edge of Cannock Chase next to the River Trent; it is seven miles (11 kilometres) north-west of Lichfield, eight miles (13 km) south-east of Stafford, four miles (6 km) north-east of Hednesford and 10 miles (16 km) southwest of Uttoxeter. At the 2021 Census, the population was 26,156.

Rugeley is twinned with Western Springs, Illinois and, in July 1962, both towns made telephone history on national television when the chairman of Rugeley Urban District Council made the first telephone call via the new Telstar satellite to the mayor of Western Springs. It was also featured in an article about workers' rights and town transformation in the 21st century.

== History ==
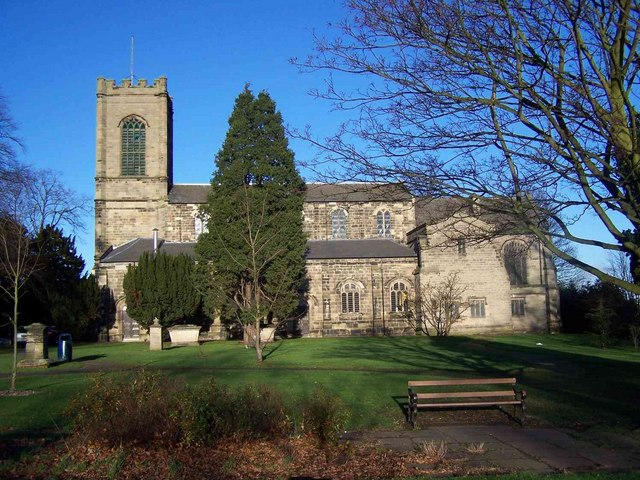
St Augustine's Church, Rugeley

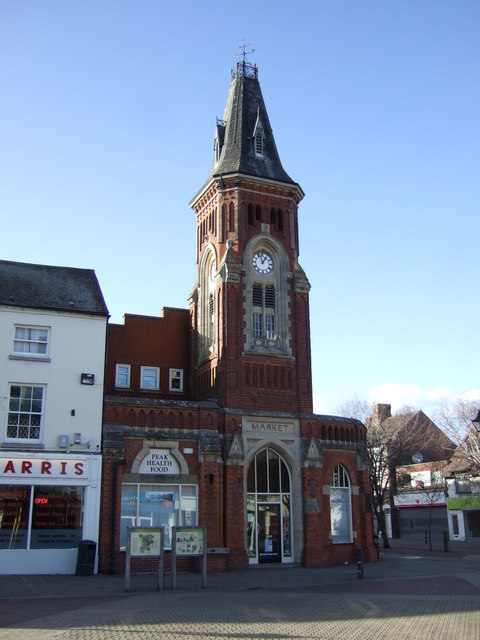
The clock tower which once formed part of Rugeley Town Hall

The town, historically known as Rudgeley or Ridgeley, is listed in the Domesday Book of 1086. This name is thought to be derived from 'Ridge lee', or 'the hill over the field'. In the mediaeval period, it thrived on iron workings and was also a site of glass manufacturing. During the Industrial Revolution the economy of Rugeley benefited from the construction of the Trent and Mersey Canal and then from it becoming a junction on the railway network.

Rugeley was considered royal land and Cannock Chase was considered a royal forest. In 1189, Rugeley was sold to the Bishop of Lichfield and Coventry by King Richard I the Lionheart. Rugeley was still relatively small at this point.

By 1259, Rugeley had grown significantly enough to be granted the right to hold a weekly market. To this day there is a weekly outdoor market held in the town.

In 1532, the manor of Rugeley was inherited by the Chetwynd family who held it until 1764. In 1768, the manor passed to Thomas Anson, later Viscount Anson.

In 1709 Rugeley was hit with two disasters. One was a fire that ravaged the town (the town had been hit by a fire sixty years prior to this too, making this the second such disaster) and the other was when the Rising Brook which runs through the town broke its banks and flooded the town.

Rugeley was an agricultural community for hundreds of years and held regular sheep, cattle and horse fairs. This reached its peak in the mid 19th century and lasting until the 1930s. The Rugeley annual horse fair was known internationally and attracted trade from far and away. To this day there is a main road in Rugeley town centre called Horsefair honouring this, as well as another street honouring the sheep fair.

St. Augustine's Church in Rugeley has memorials to the Levett family, who live at nearby Milford Hall and who established the Rugeley Home and Cottage Hospital on Church Street in 1866.

From 1894 to 1974 the town was administered by Rugeley Urban District Council which was based at Rugeley Town Hall; the town hall was largely demolished in 1978 and all that remains of the building now is the clock tower.

Between 1793 and 1967 Rugeley Grammar School provided selective secondary education for the town and also for Hednesford. Historical characters who were educated at RGS include the banker and railway promoter Edward Charles Blount and the Australian pioneer and politician Charles Bonney.

Although smaller pits had existed beforehand, the town became a centre of industrial scale deep-shaft coal mining from the 1950s, to access similar coal seams to those under Cannock Chase. The Lea Hall Colliery that opened in July 1960 was the first modern coal mine opened by the National Coal Board, which managed the United Kingdom's nationalized coal industry. Nearby the Central Electricity Generating Board built the two Rugeley power stations. With the construction of Rugeley A and B power stations Rugeley became a major centre for electricity generation. These developments led to the town growing very quickly in the 1960s. The Rugeley A power station was designed to take its fuel directly from Lea Hall by conveyor belt (although the coal was of poor quality not suitable for Rugeley B). This was the first such arrangement in Britain. Rugeley power station was shut in 2016 and demolished in stages in 2021. Rugeley was once home to an Amazon fulfilment centre, which was built at the Tower Business Park. The centre closed permanently on 3 March 2024.

== Transport ==
=== Railway ===
For many years in the 1970s and 1980s, Rugeley was served by British Rail with four services each way to and from Stafford and Rugby/Coventry. After the closure of Rugeley A power station and Lea Hall Colliery, with the consequential reduction in rail freight, it became possible to open up the Rugeley to Walsall line for passenger traffic. Rugeley now has two railway stations: Rugeley Trent Valley and Rugeley Town.

Rugeley Trent Valley lies on the West Coast Main Line; it has a regular hourly service to London via Lichfield, Nuneaton, Rugby and Milton Keynes, and to Crewe via Stafford and Stoke-on-Trent. Rugeley Trent Valley also has a half-hourly service via Rugeley Town railway station and the Chase Line suburban route connecting to Walsall and Birmingham New Street.

=== Buses ===
Regular bus services 826 and 828 link Rugeley to the town of Stafford (going north-west) and city of Lichfield (going south). Service 63 links Rugeley to Hednesford (going south-west) and Uttoxeter (going North). These Chaserider operated routes also link nearby rural villages of Colwich and Great Haywood. They also link the towns neighbourhoods including Springfields, Brereton and Pear Tree. Service 828 runs evening and Sundays with funding from Staffordshire County Council. Service 151 starts 1st September linking Rugeley to Stone for the first time in many years.

=== Canal ===
The town continues to benefit from the Trent and Mersey Canal on its eastern side which, since the popularity of canals as a leisure activity, brings additional tourism into the town. The canal runs from Preston Brook to Shardlow, through Cheshire, Staffordshire and Derbyshire.

=== Roads ===
The major roads into Rugeley are the A460 from Wolverhampton and the A51, via Tamworth, Lichfield to Stone before going through Nantwich and ending at Chester. A new eastern bypass was opened in 2007, to facilitate the development of new employment areas on the former colliery site and to reduce congestion in the town centre.

== Media ==
=== Television ===
BBC Midlands Today and ITV News Central cover Rugeley from studios in Birmingham. These are mainly received from the Sutton Coldfield transmitting station; however, some parts of the town are shielded from Sutton Coldfield and rely on the Rugeley relay, located at The Hart School.

Some parts of Rugeley can also receive good signals from the Waltham transmitting station near Melton Mowbray in Leicestershire, which carries BBC East Midlands and the East Midlands variant of ITV Central.

=== Radio ===
Rugeley lies within the coverage areas of the West Midlands regional stations, like Heart and Greatest Hits Radio, Capital Mid-Counties and Hits Radio Staffordshire & Cheshire in Stoke-on-Trent. BBC Local Radio is covered by BBC Radio WM from Birmingham on 95.6 FM, though reception is not good and, in some parts, BBC Radio Stoke on 94.6 FM is better received.

The town is covered by Cannock Chase Radio, a community radio station.

=== Newspapers ===
For many years up to 1980, Rugeley had its own newspaper: the Rugeley Times, published from Bow Street. The newspaper was sold to the Staffordshire Newsletter. Today, the town is covered by the Express and Star. A team of students from The Hart School began writing a local newspaper called The Hart of Rugeley; this is now published three times a year.

== Demography ==
In the 2011 census, Rugeley was 96.5% White British. Much of the ageing population and their families are linked to the ex-mining communities, with an increasing proportion of the younger population being new to the area and associated with the services sector. As former mining towns, Rugeley including the Brereton area suffer from a moderate level of social deprivation, with parts of the town consisting of council or ex-council house stock (such as the Springfield Estate and parts of Brereton) or former National Coal Board housing, such as the Pear Tree Estate. However, on the fringes of Rugeley there is more affluence, and some of the older Georgian streets including the conservation area of Crossley Stone or waterfront properties along the Trent and Mersey Canal. A number of new houses were built in the housing boom of the early 2000s, providing a mixture of affordable and higher-end properties.

== Religion ==
=== Church of England ===
The parish church of Rugeley is St Augustine's Church, dedicated to St Augustine of Canterbury. The present church, a Grade II* listed building, was built in 1822–23 to replace the medieval parish church. What remains of the former church, primarily the tower and chancel, is a Grade II listed building and is known as the 'Old Chancel'. A school next to it is called Chancel School. Other churches within the Rugeley area include The Church of the Good Shepherd, Rugeley Community Church, Victory Church, The Church of the Holy Spirit and St Michael's Church.

=== Roman Catholic ===
St Joseph and St Etheldreda is a Roman Catholic church in Rugeley, dedicated to Saint Joseph and Saint Etheldreda. It is in the Gothic Revival style of the 19th Century and was designed by Charles Hansom and built between 1849 and 1851 out of local stone. There is a Catholic primary school in the town dedicated, as the church is, to Saint Joseph. The Parish is part of the Archdiocese of Birmingham.

=== Methodist ===
The Methodist church of Rugeley is named after St Paul and located close to the town centre on Lichfield Street. It is a Methodist/ United Reformed Church. Along with the main town centre Methodist church there is also one in the Brereton area of the town.

== Sport ==
Rugeley is home to two cricket clubs (Rugeley C.C. and Trent Valley C.C.), several football clubs, Rugeley Rugby Club and Staffordshire Quantums Rugby League.

Rugeley Snooker Club (previously known as Rugeley Billiards Club) was established in 1850. Since 1964, after it had to relocate from Bow Street, it has owned and has been based at Heron Court Hall, a large gothic style mansion built in 1851 (by Joseph Whitgreave, who was also a chief founder of the St Joseph and St Etheldreda church, built opposite the mansion). The club has 4 well maintained snooker tables, including an accessible table situated on the ground floor, a members bar and a small function room that can be hired out for local community based purposes.

Rugeley Rifle Club, catering to .22 and air gun target shooting, moved to its current location near the Town Station in 1971 and is noted for member Victoria Bradbury, bronze medallist at the 2018 ISSF World Shooting Championships.

The Lea Hall Social Club, which underwent extensive renovation between 2005 and 2011, serves Rugeley residents with a variety of facilities including cricket and football pitches, a crown bowling green. There used to be tennis courts, but they are now gone and replaced with housing.

Etching Hill Tennis Club has offered casual and competitive hard court play to members since 1952.

Hawkesyard Golf (formerly known as the St. Thomas Priory Golf Course) is to the east of the town on the Hawkesyard Estate.

== Events ==
The town council also puts on a fireworks display during the last weekend of the school summer holidays, known as "Back to School with a Bang". A Christmas lights switch-on during December includes a market and late-night opening of shops, with the local traders association joining in the organising of street entertainment.

A Pagan conference happens on the May bank holiday every year. Staffordshire Pagan Conference started in 2015 and was held at Lea Hall Social Club. The conference is attended by over 250 people from all over the country. Over £1,000 has been donated to Staffordshire Wildlife Trust with the profit from the event. As of 2018 the conference relocated to The Rose Theatre and become Witchfest Midlands.

In 2016 and 2017, the British Quidditch Cup was held at Rugeley Leisure Centre. The third British Quidditch Cup took place on 19 and 20 March 2016, with 32 teams competing, and the winners were Oxford's team, the Radcliffe Chimeras. The fourth British Quidditch Cup took place on 11 and 12 March 2017, with 32 teams competing, and the winners were Velociraptors QC.

In February 2020 a new "Fringe Festival" was announced with a variety of events intended to be held in the town over the May Bank Holiday. The Festival was cancelled in March due to the COVID-19 pandemic.

Cannock Chase is a venue for the Forest Live series of music events, with concerts held at Birches Valley Forest Centre, Rugeley. As with other Forest Live events it hosts different live acts from big name bands each year. Past acts have included Paul Weller, UB40, Kaiser Chiefs and Paloma Faith.

== Future ==
Rugeley suffered an increase in unemployment when Lea Hall Colliery closed in 1990. Following many years of demolition and regeneration, a number of large industrial units have been built on the Towers Business Park, a brownfield site situated on the former ground of the colliery. In August 2011, Amazon.co.uk opened a 700,000 sq ft fulfillment centre on the Towers Park, creating between 700 and 900 full-time jobs as well as generating a large pool of seasonal work around Christmas. In June 2023 the closure of the Towers Park Amazon fulfillment centre was announced, following the opening of a new centre in Sutton Coldfield.

Rugeley's future looks set to benefit from the recent closure and demolition of the power station. The Brownfields site will be developed. This development has been earmarked to include 2,300 new homes as well as housing for the elderly. There will be a new all-through school, the first in Staffordshire, which will accommodate 1,400 pupils. There will be over 12 acres used for employment as well as a riverside country park and a new water sports leisure facility at the Borrow Pit Lake. There will also be commercial development in the area. This new development will be a massive boost to the area and the whole new development will be low carbon.

== Notable people ==
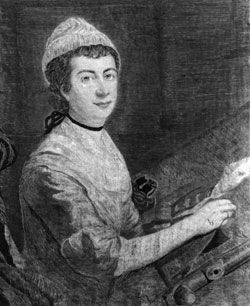
Mary Morris Knowles, self-portrait, 1779

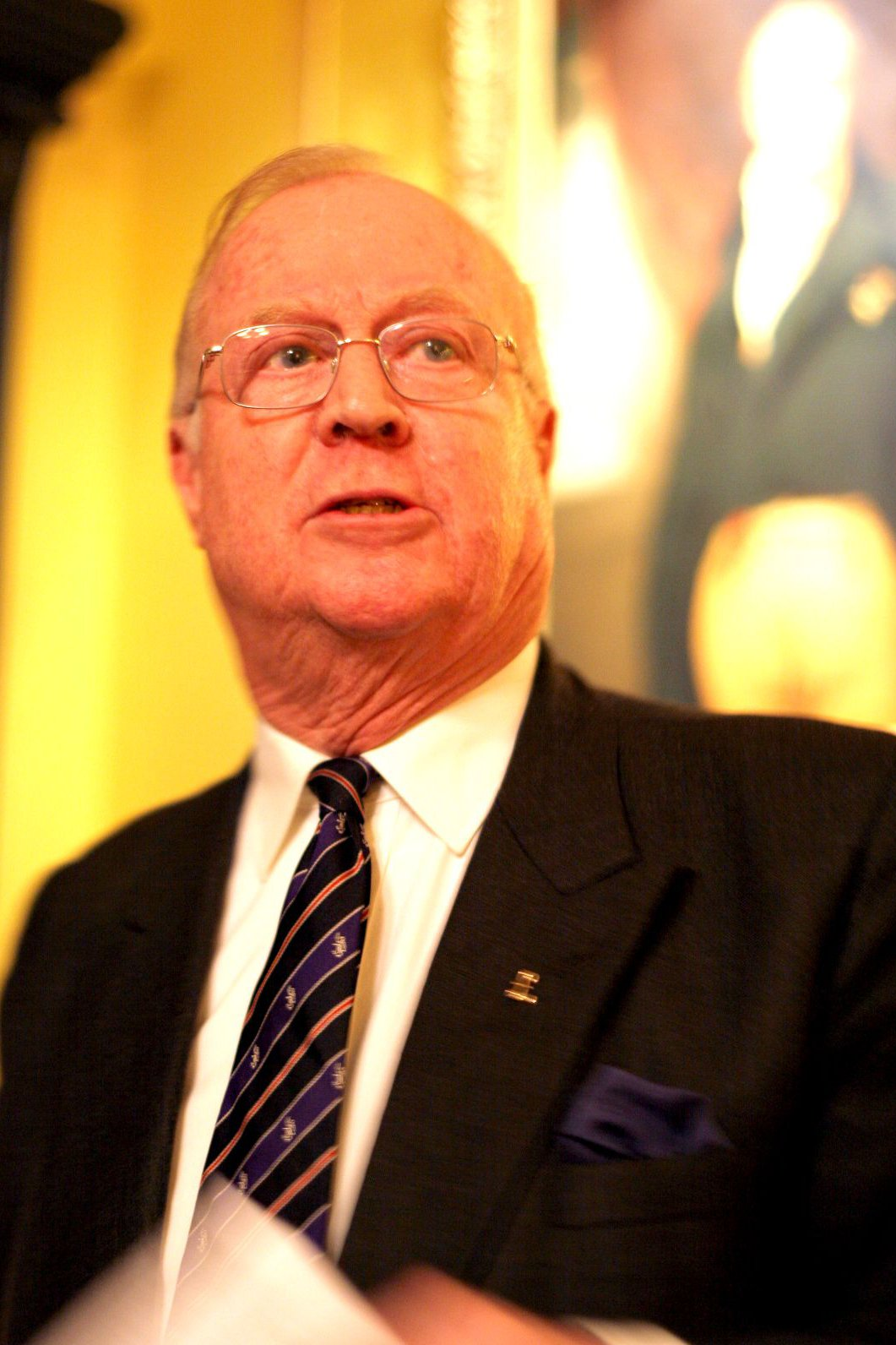
Sir Nicholas Winterton, 2010

- Thomas Weston (1584–1646), Merchant adventurer, joined the Worshipful Company of Ironmongers in 1609
- Mary Morris Knowles (1733–1807), Quaker poet, supported abolition of the slave trade and slavery.
- John Stevenson Salt (1777–1845), barrister, banker and land owner, High Sheriff of Staffordshire in 1838
- Sir Edward Charles Blount KCB (1809–1905), banker in Paris and promoter of French railways.
- William Palmer (1824–1856), surgeon and serial murderer known as "The Prince of Poisons".
- Thomas George Bonney (1833–1923), geologist, president of the Geological Society of London.
- John Porter (1838–1922), thoroughbred flat racing trainer, founder of Newbury Racecourse
- Frederic Bonney (1842–1921), British land owner, photographer and anthropologist
- Ethelred Luke Taunton (1857–1907), Roman Catholic priest and historical writer.
- Selwyn MacGregor Grier (1878–1946), a British colonial administrator, Governor-in-Chief of the Windward Islands, 1935 to 1937.
- Lynda Grier (1880–1967), a British educational administrator and policy advisor
- John Simkin (1883–1967), the 6th Anglican Bishop of Auckland
- Sir Nicholas Raymond Winterton (born 1938) Conservative Party politician, MP for Macclesfield 1971 / 2010.
- Scout Niblett (born 1973), singer-songwriter and musician, raised locally.
- Amy Di Bartolomeo (born 1992), actress

=== Sport ===
- William Burns (1883–1916), cricketer, played more than 200 first-class matches mainly for Worcestershire.
- Paul Davies-Hale (born 1962), long-distance runner, competed in the 1984 Summer Olympics in the 3000m steeplechase and at 1992 Summer Olympics in the marathon
- Robert Rock (born 1977), professional golfer, grew up locally; he has played on the European Tour since 2003.
- George Pilkington (born 1981), former footballer, played 560 games.
- Theo Wylie (born 17th January 2006) Professional cricketer. England U19s.

== Nearby towns and cities ==
- Birmingham
- Burton upon Trent
- Burntwood
- Hednesford
- Lichfield
- Stafford
- Stone
- Stoke-on-Trent
- Tamworth
- Uttoxeter
- Walsall
- Wolverhampton

=== Villages ===
- Abbots Bromley
- Admaston
- Armitage
- Blithbury
- Colton
- Colwich
- Great Haywood
- Hamstall Ridware
- Handsacre
- Hill Ridware
- Kings Bromley
- Little Haywood
- Longdon
- Mavesyn Ridware
- Penkridge
- Pipe Ridware
- Rake End
- Upper Longdon

=== Other ===
- Blithfield Reservoir
- Brindley Heath
- Cannock Chase
- Chasewater
- Shugborough
- Wolseley Centre

== Twin town ==
Rugeley is twinned with:

- Western Springs, Illinois, USA

== See also ==
- Listed buildings in Rugeley
