= Grade II* listed buildings in Stoke-on-Trent =

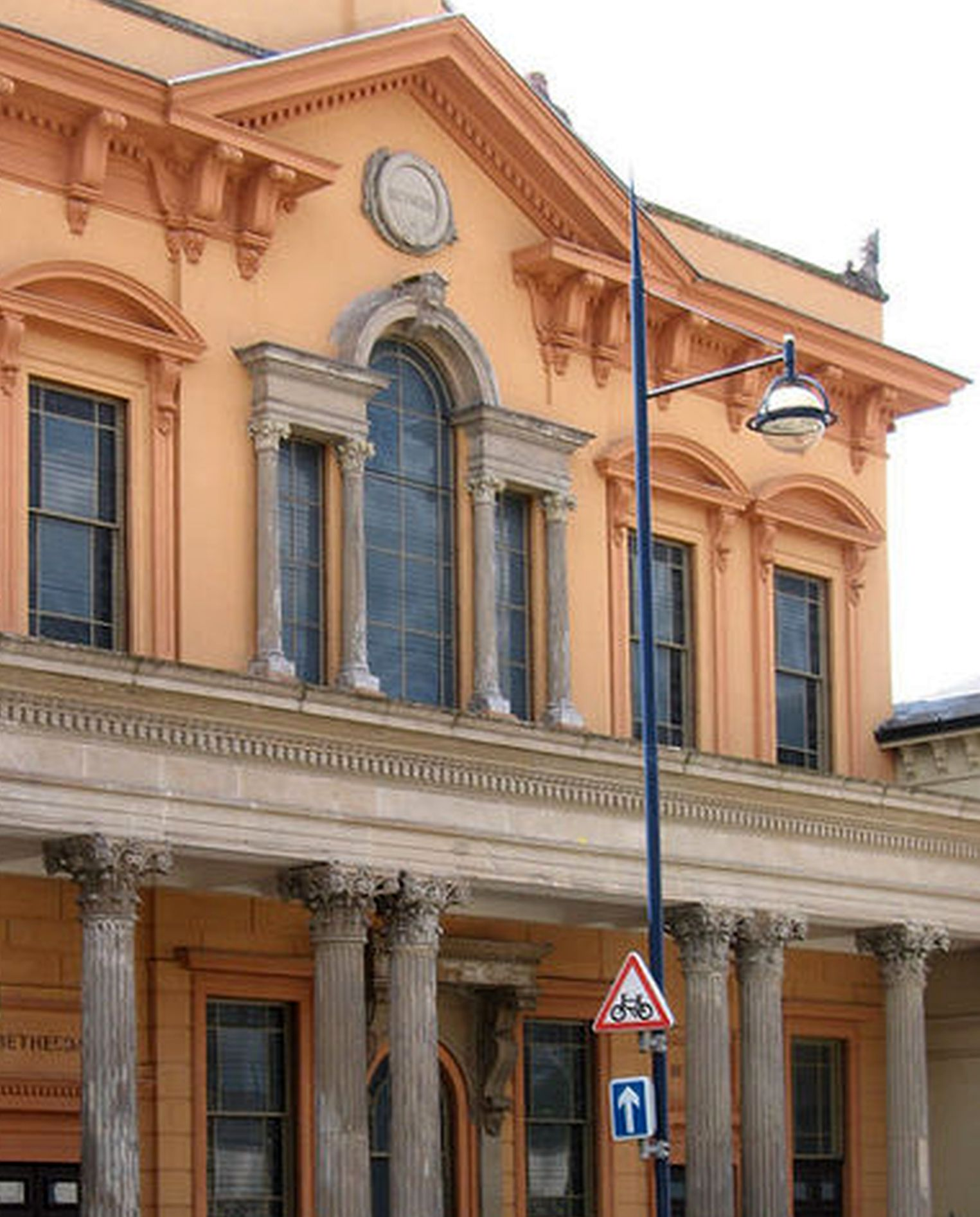
Bethesda Methodist Chapel, constructed in 1819 and listed in 1972

Stoke-on-Trent is a city located in Staffordshire, England. The city is a linear conurbation of six constituent towns (Burslem, Fenton, Longton, Tunstall, Stoke-upon-Trent and Hanley, with the latter being regarded as the city centre). Stoke-on-Trent is considered to be the home of the pottery industry in England and is commonly known as the Potteries. Formerly a primarily industrial conurbation, it is now a centre for service industries and distribution centres.

There are over 20,000 Grade II* listed buildings in England and this page is a list of these buildings in the city of Stoke-on-Trent. There are sixteen buildings or structures that have been listed by the Secretary of State for Culture, Olympics, Media and Sport as Grade II*, which signifies "particularly important buildings of more than special interest".

In the United Kingdom, the term "listed building" refers to a building or other structure officially designated as being of special architectural, historical or cultural significance. These buildings are in three grades: Grade I consists of buildings of outstanding architectural or historical interest; Grade II* includes particularly significant buildings of more than local interest. Buildings in England are listed on recommendations provided by English Heritage, which also determines the grading.

== Listed buildings and structures ==
Name	Location	Type	Completed (Note: The date given is the date used by Historic England as significant for the initial building or that of an important part in the structure's description.)	Date designated	Grid ref. (Note: Sometimes known as OSGB36, the grid reference is based on the British national grid reference system used by the Ordnance Survey.) Geo-coordinates	Entry number (Note: The "List Entry Number" is a unique number assigned to each listed building and scheduled monument by Historic England.)	Image
Bethesda Methodist Chapel	Hanley, City of Stoke-on-Trent	Methodist Chapel	1819	19 April 1972	SJ8822847351; 53°01′24″N 2°10′37″W	1195821	Bethesda Methodist Chapel More images
Former Church of St John the Evangelist	Hanley, City of Stoke-on-Trent	Former Church	1788-90	2 October 1951	SJ8835947868; 53°01′41″N 2°10′30″W	1210680	Former Church of St John the Evangelist More images
Church of the Holy Trinity	Hartshill, City of Stoke-on-Trent	Church	1842	19 April 1972	53°00′35″N 2°12′07″W	1195800	Church of the Holy Trinity More images
Etruscan Bone Mill	Etruria, City of Stoke-on-Trent	Bone and flint mill	C20	15 March 1993	SJ8721546825; 53°01′07″N 2°11′31″W	1195818	Etruscan Bone Mill More images
Ford Green Hall and Attached Wall and Dovecote	Smallthorne, City of Stoke-on-Trent	Farmhouse	Late 16th century	2 October 1951	SJ8873950860; 53°03′18″N 2°10′10″W	1220313	Ford Green Hall and Attached Wall and Dovecote More images
Former Gladstone and Park Place (Roslyn) Works	Longton, City of Stoke-on-Trent	Pottery works	c1860 and later	19 April 1972	SJ9129543256; 52°59′12″N 2°07′52″W	1195854	Former Gladstone and Park Place (Roslyn) Works More images
Former Wedgwood Institute (public Library)	Burslem, City of Stoke-on-Trent	Art School	1869	19 April 1972	SJ8686649748; 53°02′41″N 2°11′50″W	1195840	Former Wedgwood Institute (public Library) More images
Middleport Pottery (Burgess and Leigh)	Middleport, City of Stoke-on-Trent	Pottery works with bottle oven	1888-9	20 August 1979	SJ8604849321; 53°02′28″N 2°12′34″W	1297939	Middleport Pottery (Burgess and Leigh) More images
North Staffordshire Hotel	Stoke-upon-Trent, City of Stoke-on-Trent	Hotel	1848	19 April 1972	SJ8800745691; 53°00′30″N 2°10′49″W	1290251	North Staffordshire Hotel More images
Odeon Cinema (now Regent Theatre)	Hanley, City of Stoke-on-Trent	Cinema/theatre	1929	30 November 1989	SJ8825447476; 53°01′28″N 2°10′36″W	1195837	Odeon Cinema (now Regent Theatre) More images
Old Town Hall	Burslem, City of Stoke-on-Trent	Town Hall	1854	2 October 1951	SJ8683249844; 53°02′45″N 2°11′52″W	1195811	Old Town Hall More images
Pithead Baths and Canteen at Chatterley Whitfield Colliery	Whitfield, City of Stoke-on-Trent	Colliery	1936-1937	23 February 1994	SJ8835853428; 53°04′41″N 2°10′31″W	1260223	Pithead Baths and Canteen at Chatterley Whitfield Colliery
Price and Kensington Teapot Works	Longton, City of Stoke-on-Trent	Pottery works	Early 19th century	20 August 1979	SJ8577749728; 53°02′41″N 2°12′49″W	1290799	Price and Kensington Teapot Works
Stoke-on-Trent railway station	Stoke-upon-Trent, City of Stoke-on-Trent	Railway Station	1847	19 April 1972	SJ8796445658; 53°00′29″N 2°10′51″W	1210928	Stoke-on-Trent railway station More images
The Round House	Etruria, City of Stoke-on-Trent	Pottery Works	c. 1769	19 April 1972	SJ8690947305; 53°01′22″N 2°11′48″W	1291071	The Round House More images
1 Moorland Road	Burslem, City of Stoke-on-Trent	House	1751	2 October 1951	SJ8692349861; 53°02′45″N 2°11′47″W	1220792	Upload Photo
