= Canville =

Canville or de Canville may refer to:

- Canville Creek, a river in Kansas
- Canville Township, Neosho County, Kansas
- Gerard de Canville (also written Camville; died 1214), Anglo-Norman landowner and administrator in England
- Thomas de Canville (also written Camville; died 1234), Anglo-Norman landowner and judge in England

== See also ==
- Canville-la-Rocque
- Canville-les-Deux-Églises
- Baron Camville
- Richard de Camville
- Clifton Campville
