= Baron Camville =

Barony in the Peerage of England

Arms of de Camville: Azure, three lions passant argent

Baron Camville (or Canville) was a title created in the Peerage of England for Geoffrey de Camville II (died 1308), of Clifton Campville in Staffordshire, who having been summoned to Parliament on 24 June 1295 and subsequently, by writs directed to Galfrido de Caunvilla, Caumvilla, Canvilla or Camvilla, was deemed thereby to have been created Baron Camville (or Baron Canville).

== de Camville family ==
From about 1200 the manor of Clifton in Staffordshire (which later took its distinguishing suffix from its lords) was held by the de Camville (or de Canville) family, at least until 1338, which originated probably at the Normandy manor of Canville-la-Rocque, in La Manche (not at Canville-les-Deux-Églises in the Pays de Caux). The arms of the de Camville family were: Azure, three lions passant argent. The descent in the de Camville family was as follows:

- William de Camville I, younger brother of Richard de Camville who was Governor of Cyprus under Richard I 'Coeur de Lion' and died in 1191 at the Siege of Acre during the Third Crusade. Their parents were Richard de Camville (died 1176) and Millicent de Rethel, daughter of Gervais, Count of Rethel and 2nd cousin to Adeliza of Louvain the second wife of King Henry I of England. William de Camville married Auberée Marmion (fl.1233), daughter and heiress of Geoffrey Marmion of Clifton and of Arrow, Warwickshire. (Dugdale and others erroneously state William and Auberée to have been the parents of the 1st Baron, rather than the great-grandparents, as noted in The Complete Peerage).
- Geoffrey de Camville I (died 1219) of Clifton, who married twice: firstly to Felice de Worcester, a daughter of Philip de Worcester, from whom he was divorced due to consanguinity, having had a son Richard de Camville; Secondly he married Leuca de Braiose (died 1236), a granddaughter of William de Braiose, of the marcher lords family.
- William de Camville II (died 1260), 2nd son and heir (by his father's second wife Leuca de Braiose), of Clifton and of Llansteffan in Carmarthen, Wales and of Fedamore, County Limerick and Caher, County Tipperary, both in Ireland. He was awarded possession of the manor of Clifton following a legal dispute with his elder half-brother Richard de Camville. He married a certain Lucy (d.post-1284);
- Geoffrey de Camville II, 1st Baron Camville (died 1308), son and heir, of Clifton, who having been summoned to Parliament on 24 June 1295 and subsequently, by writs directed to Galfrido de Caunvilla, Caumvilla, Canvilla or Camvilla, was deemed thereby to have been created Baron Camville (or Baron Canville). He was knighted after 1272. In 1282 he was serving in the army of West Wales and was summoned for military service from 1276 to 1308, and to attend the king from 1294 to 1297. He married twice, firstly to Maud de Brian (1242 – d.pre-1279), widow of Nicholas Martin (son and heir apparent of Nicholas FitzMartin of Kemes/Cemais in Pembrokeshire and feudal baron of Blagdon in Somerset), a daughter of Guy de Brian of Laugharne, Carmarthenshire, Wales, by his wife Eve de Tracy, daughter and heiress of Henry de Tracy, feudal baron of Barnstaple in Devon. On 24 September 1274 Geoffrey de Camville II gave homage to the king and received livery of the lands of Henry de Tracy, his first wife's maternal grandfather. Secondly he married a certain Joan.
- William de Camville III, 2nd Baron Camville (1268–1338), of Clifton, son and heir, who died without male issue leaving five daughters and co-heiresses, between the descendants of whom the barony is deemed to be in abeyance:
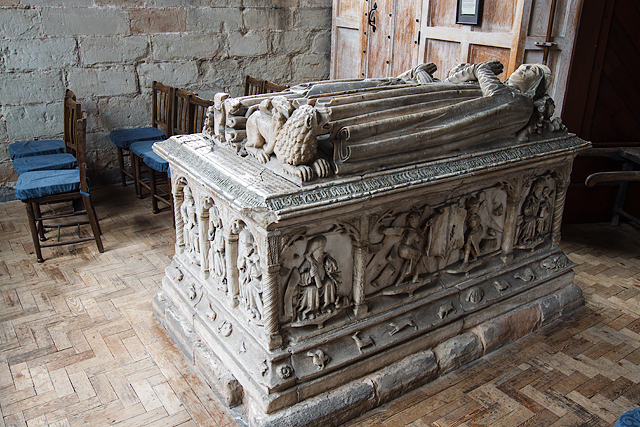
  Monument to Sir John Vernon (died 1545) and his wife in St Andrew's Church, Clifton Campville
  - Maud de Camville, who married Richard de Vernon (died 1323), whom she survived into widowhood, son and heir apparent of Richard de Vernon of Haddon Hall in Derbyshire, who predeceased his father. Her descendants remained connected with the manor of Clifton Campville, as evidenced by the fine effigies of Sir John Vernon (died 1545) and his wife in St Andrew's Church. Her daughter Isabel de Vernon (died 1356) married Richard Stafford, 1st Baron Stafford of Clifton (born post 1301, died 1381), the second son of Edmund Stafford, 1st Baron Stafford of Stafford Castle in Staffordshire (1272/3–1308) and the younger brother of Ralph Stafford, 1st Earl of Stafford, 2nd Baron Stafford (1301–1372) of Stafford Castle).
  - Alianore de Camville, died unmarried;
  - Isabel de Camville, who married Gilbert de Bermingham;
  - Nicole de Camville, who married John de Saint Clere;
  - Katherine de Camville, who married Robert de Greseleye.
