= Clifton Campville =

Village in Staffordshire, England

Coordinates: 52.696°N 1.625°W

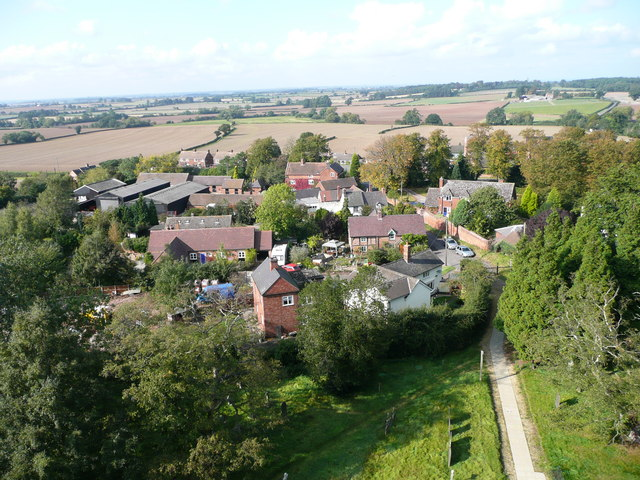
- Clifton Campville from above

- Location within Staffordshire
- Population: 912 (2011)
- OS grid reference: SK255110
- Civil parish: Clifton Campville
- District: Lichfield
- Shire county: Staffordshire
- Region: West Midlands
- Country: England
- Sovereign state: United Kingdom
- Post town: TAMWORTH
- Postcode district: B79
- Dialling code: 01827
- Police: Staffordshire
- Fire: Staffordshire
- Ambulance: West Midlands
- UK Parliament: Tamworth

Clifton Campville is a village, former manor and civil parish in Staffordshire, England. It lies on the River Mease, about 10 miles (16 km) east of the City of Lichfield, 6 miles (10 km) west of Measham and 7 miles (11 km) north of Tamworth. The village lies close to Staffordshire's borders with Derbyshire, Leicestershire and Warwickshire. The parish, which includes Haunton village, had a population of 912 at the 2011 census. There is a fine gothic church, dedicated to St Andrew, and listed Grade I. The village pub, The Green Man, is also a historic building.

== Etymology ==
The first part of the name is Old English clif tun, that is cliff farm; the family de Camvill held the land in the early 13th century. The name has also been recorded as Clistone.

== Descent of the manor ==
There is some evidence of pre-Saxon, or even pre-historic settlement in the area. After the Norman Conquest of 1066 the manor was in the royal demesne. The manor of Clistone is listed in the Domesday Book of 1086 as having 33 villagers, a priest, 11 ploughs and 2 mills. One of the mills was possibly at Mill Farm.

=== de Camville ===
From 1200 it was held by the de Camville (or de Canville) family, at least until 1338, which originated probably at the Normandy manor of Canville-la-Rocque, in La Manche (not at Canville-les-Deux-Églises in the Pays de Caux). The arms of the de Camville family were: Azure, three lions passant argent. The descent in the de Camville family was as follows:

- William de Camville I, who married Auberée Marmion (fl.1233), daughter and heiress of Geoffrey Marmion of Clifton and of Arrow, Warwickshire. (Dugdale and others erroneously state William and Auberée to have been the parents of the 1st Baron, rather than the great-grandparents, as noted in The Complete Peerage).
- Geoffrey de Camville I (d.1219) of Clifton, who married twice: firstly to Felice de Worcester, a daughter of Philip de Worcester, from whom he was divorced due to consanguinity, having had a son Richard de Camville; Secondly he married Leuca de Braiose (d.1236), a granddaughter of William de Braiose, of the marcher lords family.
- William de Camville II (d.1260), 2nd son and heir (by his father's second wife Leuca de Braiose), of Clifton and of Llansteffan in Carmarthen, Wales and of Fedamore, County Limerick and Caher, County Tipperary, both in Ireland. He was awarded possession of the manor of Clifton following a legal dispute with his elder half-brother Richard de Camville. He married a certain Lucy (d.post-1284);
- Geoffrey de Camville II, 1st Baron Camville (d.1308), son and heir, of Clifton, who having been summoned to Parliament on 24 June 1295 and subsequently, by writs directed to Galfrido de Caunvilla, Caumvilla, Canvilla or Camvilla, was deemed thereby to have been created Baron Camville (or Baron Canville). He was knighted after 1272. In 1282 he was serving in the army of West Wales and was summoned for military service from 1276 to 1308, and to attend the king from 1294 to 1297. He married twice, firstly to Maud de Brian (1242 – d.pre-1279), widow of Nicholas Martin (son and heir apparent of Nicholas FitzMartin of Kemes/Cemais in Pembrokeshire and feudal baron of Blagdon in Somerset), a daughter of Guy de Brian of Laugharne, Carmarthenshire, Wales, by his wife Eve de Tracy, daughter and heiress of Henry de Tracy, feudal baron of Barnstaple in Devon. On 24 September 1274 Geoffrey de Camville II gave homage to the king and received livery of the lands of Henry de Tracy, his first wife's maternal grandfather. Secondly he married a certain Joan.
- William de Camville III, 2nd Baron Camville (1268–1338), of Clifton, son and heir, who died without male issue leaving five daughters and co-heiresses, between the descendants of whom the barony is deemed to be in abeyance:
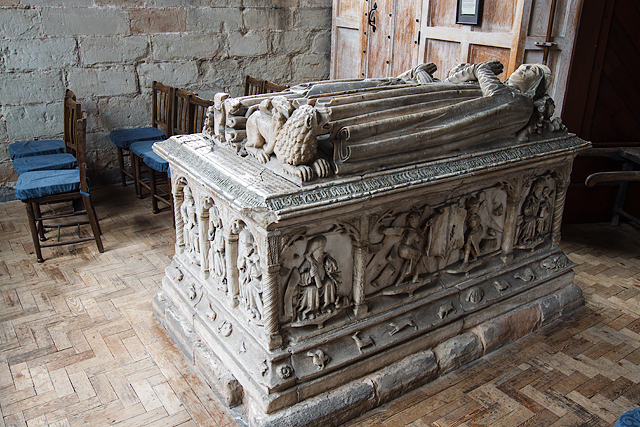
  Monument to Sir John Vernon (d.1545) and his wife in St Andrew's Church, Clifton Campville
  - Maud de Camville, who married Richard de Vernon (d.1323), whom she survived into widowhood, son and heir apparent of Richard de Vernon of Haddon Hall in Derbyshire, who predeceased his father. Her descendants remained connected with the manor of Clifton Campville, as evidenced by the fine effigies of Sir John Vernon (d.1545) and his wife in St Andrew's Church. Her daughter Isabel de Vernon (d.1356) married Richard Stafford, 1st Baron Stafford (born post 1301-d.1381) "of Clifton" (the second son of Edmund Stafford, 1st Baron Stafford (1272/3_1308) of Stafford Castle in Staffordshire and the younger brother of Ralph Stafford, 1st Earl of Stafford, 2nd Baron Stafford (1301–1372) of Stafford Castle).
  - Alianore de Camville, died unmarried;
  - Isabel de Camville, who married Gilbert de Bermingham;
  - Nicole de Camville, who married John de Saint Clere;
  - Katherine de Camville, who married Robert de Greseleye.

=== Stafford ===
- Richard Stafford, 1st Baron Stafford (born post 1301 – d.1381) "of Clifton" married Isabel de Vernon (d.1356), heiress of Clifton Campville. He was the second son of Edmund Stafford, 1st Baron Stafford (1272/3 – 1308) of Stafford Castle in Staffordshire and the younger brother of Ralph Stafford, 1st Earl of Stafford, 2nd Baron Stafford (1301–1372) of Stafford Castle. By his wife Isabel de Vernon he had two sons:
  - Richard Stafford, eldest son and heir apparent, who predeceased his father.
  - Edmund Stafford (1344–1419), Bishop of Exeter from 1395 to his death in 1419, heir to his father. Pre-Reformation bishops being unmarried, on his death without issue the manor appears to have reverted to the Vernon family.

=== Other ===
By 1700 it was in possession of the Coventry family, who sold it in that year to Sir Charles Pye, Baronet, whose descendant Henry John Pye owned the manor in 1851.

== Governance ==
In 1848 the parish included both Haunton and Harlaston, and also Chilcote in Derbyshire. Clifton itself then had a population of 341, while the population of the whole parish was 921 on 6,300 acres (25 km^{2}). The core parish of Clifton and Haunton covered around 3,000 acres (12 km^{2}) in 1851. It became part of Tamworth Poor Law Union in 1836; in 1866 Harlaston became a civil parish in its own right. In 1894 Clifton with Haunton became a civil parish within the newly constituted Tamworth Rural District.

The civil parish became part of Lichfield Rural District during the boundary changes of 1934. In 1974 it became part of the new non-metropolitan district of Lichfield. The parish council meets jointly with Thorpe Constantine.

Electorally the parish is part of the Mease and Tame ward of Lichfield District, and lies within the parliamentary constituency of Tamworth.

== Landmarks ==
Clifton contains a number of listed buildings, including the Grade I listed Church of St Andrew, Clifton Hall, Manor Farm, the old Post Office and the village pub, the Green Man. There are also several historic buildings in Haunton.

=== Church of St Andrew ===
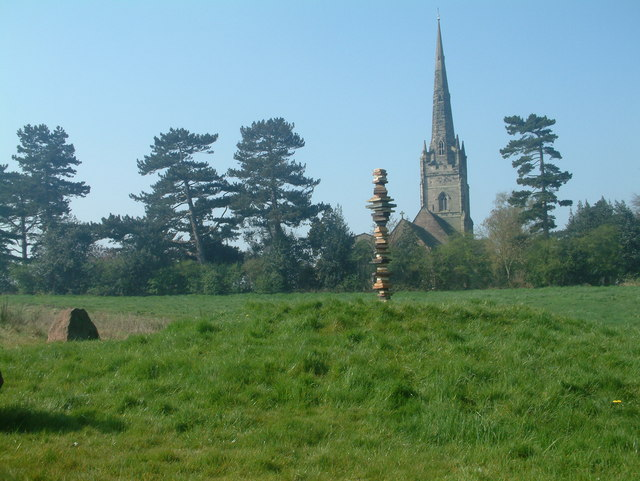
Church and monument at Clifton Campville

The parish church, dedicated to St Andrew, is a Grade I listed building. Though nothing remains of the building mentioned in Domesday, some parts of the south wall date back to the year 1200, with traces of 13th century wall paintings. The church was enlarged into the shape of a cross in the first half of the 13th century. It was enlarged again in the 14th century. The tower was built in the first half of the 14th century, with a spire, reaching to a height of about 210 feet (65 m), added at some time during the century. The interior includes 14th century screens carved from oak; the rood screen is from the 15th century, as is some stained glass in one of the north windows. The church was restored by George Edmund Street in the second half of the 19th century, and again by W. D. Caroe in the early 20th century. In 1984 the spire was struck by lightning, with much damage to the church. Repairs were completed in 1987.

The adjoining cemetery also dates back to mediaeval days.

The Church of England parish includes Haunton and Chilcote, and also Statfold.

The Old Rectory is in origin a 15th-century building, though the history of the rectory can be traced further back, to the mid 14th century. The building was altered in 1694, and again in 1778, and restored in around 1980. It is listed Grade II.

== Education ==
The village school is St Andrew's Church of England Controlled Primary School. In 2009 it had 63 pupils, and was rated as 'outstanding' by OFSTED.

== See also ==
- Listed buildings in Clifton Campville
