= Statfold =

Former village in Staffordshire, England

Coordinates: 52.661111°N 1.650000°W

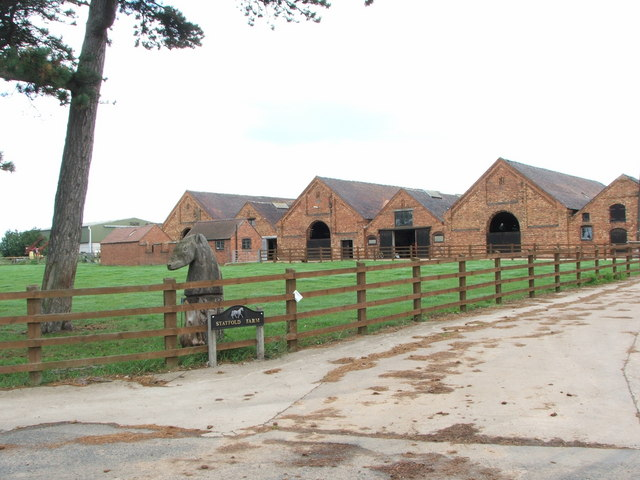
- Statfold Farm

- Location within Staffordshire
- OS grid reference: SK237072
- Civil parish: Thorpe Constantine
- District: Lichfield
- Shire county: Staffordshire
- Region: West Midlands
- Country: England
- Sovereign state: United Kingdom
- Post town: TAMWORTH
- Postcode district: B79 0
- Dialling code: 01827
- Police: Staffordshire
- Fire: Staffordshire
- Ambulance: West Midlands
- UK Parliament: Tamworth

Statfold is a former village and civil parish, now in the parish of Thorpe Constantine, in the Lichfield district, in Staffordshire, England. It is about 3 miles (5 km) north-east of Tamworth. These days little remains of the village itself, but the Norman parish church, and the Tudor manor house of Statfold Hall still exist, as do a few scattered farms and houses. In 1931 the parish had a population of 55.

The Statfold Barn Railway is on the other side of the Ashby Road, in the borough of Tamworth.

== History ==
The name is believed to come from the Old English stōd fald with the meaning stud fold. Older documents often use the form Stotfold. The name is not mentioned in Domesday, but does occur in 12th century records of Lichfield Cathedral. It is also possible that Statfold was one of the unnamed estates belonging to the 5 canons of Lichfield that are mentioned in Domesday. The equine tradition continues at Statfold Farm to this day.

The history of the ecclesiastical parish is traceable back to the 12th century, when "Stotfold" was named as one of the dozen or so prebends of the parochia of Lichfield Cathedral. By the 14th century it had become a prebendary parish, one of the 5 core prebends of Lichfield, supporting the 3 city churches. Already by 1241 the prebendary of Stotfold had been one of the 5 who provided special duties at the high altar of Lichfield Cathedral. The earliest known prebendary was John de Berewyk, who died in 1312. The title of Prebendary of Stotfold continued after the Reformation, with the last, Samuel Smallbrook, dying in 1803, after which the Statfold tithes were collected directly by the Dean and Chapter of Lichfield Cathedral. The parish of All Saints became part of the parish of St Andrew Clifton Campville in the 18th century.

For local government purposes Statfold became part of Tamworth Poor Law Union in 1836. In 1894 it became a civil parish within the newly constituted Tamworth Rural District. This lasted until 1 April 1934, when Statfold civil parish was incorporated into Thorpe Constantine, and became part of Lichfield Rural District.

These days no obvious signs of the village centre exist, but it has been suggested that it lay just north of the chapel, and that it was deserted as a result of enclosure in the early Tudor Period. By 1851 there were only 45 residents of the parish, living in the Hall or in one of 5 other houses. In 1870 the population was listed as 26, occupying 450 acres (180 ha).

== Landmarks ==
=== Statfold Hall ===
The manor house of Statfold Hall is a brick building dating from 1571, and is Grade II listed. The manor has been in the hands of the Wolferstan family since 1590, following the marriage of Humphrey Wolferstan to Katherine, the heiress of the Stanley family, in 1565. Francis Pipe-Wolferstan (1826–1900) was born and died at the hall, He was an old-Etonian, first-class cricketer, barrister and farmer.

The main fabric of the building dates to around 1700.

=== Chapel of All Saints ===
The mediaeval Chapel of All Saints is Grade II* listed, and stands in the grounds of the Hall. For many years it was used as a mortuary chapel for the Wolferstan family.

Described in 1851 as "neglected", and the parish too small to support a minister, the chapel was restored for use as a parish church in 1906. These days it is described as "a private chapel and not open to the public".

The building is a simple one-roomed construction, with pitched roof and gable ends. The church possesses features of Norman architecture, including typical rounded archways. The oldest parts are the west doorway and the font, both dating back to the 12th century. Other parts have been altered at various times through the centuries, especially in the early 14th century. Some parts may possibly be of Anglo-Saxon date.

Outside the chapel stands the also listed Wolferstan Memorial.

== See also ==
- Listed buildings in Thorpe Constantine
