= Edmund Stafford =

14th and 15th-century Bishop of Exeter and Chancellor of England

- Bishop of Exeter
- Detail from alabaster effigy of Edmund Stafford in Exeter Cathedral
- Appointed: 15 January 1395
- Term ended: 3 September 1419
- Predecessor: Thomas Brantingham
- Successor: John Catterick
- Previous post: Dean of York

Orders
- Consecration: 20 June 1395

Personal details
- Born: 1344
- Died: 3 September 1419 (aged 74–75)
- Buried: Exeter Cathedral
- Denomination: Catholic

Monument to Edmund Stafford, Bishop of Exeter, in the Lady Chapel of Exeter Cathedral, Devon

Arms of Stafford: Or, a chevron gules, a bordure azure semée of mitres of the field.

Edmund Stafford (1344 – 3 September 1419) was Bishop of Exeter from 1395 to his death in 1419.

== Origins ==
He was the second son of Sir Richard Stafford (born post 1301-d.1381) "of Clifton Campville" in Staffordshire (the second son of Edmund Stafford, 1st Baron Stafford (1272/3-1308) of Stafford Castle in Staffordshire and the younger brother of Ralph Stafford, 1st Earl of Stafford, 2nd Baron Stafford (1301-1372) of Stafford Castle). His father is stated in some sources to have been "Baron Stafford of Clifton", but no such title is listed in the authoritative The Complete Peerage. His mother was Isabel de Vernon (d.1356), a daughter of Richard de Vernon (d.1323) (son and heir apparent of Richard de Vernon of Haddon Hall in Derbyshire, whom he predeceased) by his wife Maud de Camville, a daughter and co-heiress of William de Camville, 2nd Baron Camville (1268-1338), of Clifton Campville.

== Career ==
Stafford attended Oxford University, graduating BA in 1363; in the same year he was appointed a canon of Lichfield. He obtained a BCL in 1369 and a DL in 1385, the same year he became dean of York. He also held the Rectorship of Clifton Campville, his family lands. Whilst dean of York, he was named keeper of the Privy Seal on 4 May 1389, keeping that role until February 1396. Later that year, he was appointed Lord Chancellor of England, holding it until 1399 when, on the accession of Henry IV, he was replaced. Two years later he again took up the role, appointed as part of a reaction against Henry's dependence on Lancastrians. He was replaced by Henry Beaufort in February 1403. Edmund continued to serve the King, trying petitions in Parliaments in 1404 and 1406 and being appointed one of the King's councillors in the parliament of 1406.

Stafford was nominated to the see of Exeter on 15 January 1395 and consecrated on 20 June 1395. Visits to his diocese were few when he was in government office; he did visit extensively in the time between appointments as Chancellor and after 1403 he became more involved, with extensive vistas in 1404, 1411 and 1414.

== Death and burial ==
Stafford died on 3 September 1419 and was buried in the Lady Chapel of Exeter Cathedral, where survives his elaborate monument with recumbent alabaster effigy. His family lands and the barony passed to Thomas Stafford. His executors are named in 1421.

== Citations ==
Political offices
Preceded by John Waltham	Lord Privy Seal; 1389–1396	Succeeded by Guy Mone
Preceded by Thomas Arundel	Lord Chancellor; 1396–1399	Succeeded by Thomas Arundel
Preceded by John Scarle	Lord Chancellor; 1401–1403	Succeeded by Henry Beaufort
Catholic Church titles
Preceded by Thomas Brantingham	Bishop of Exeter; 1395–1419	Succeeded by John Catterick
Peerage of England
Preceded by Richard Stafford	Baron Stafford of Clifton; 1380–1419	Succeeded by Thomas Stafford
