= Haunton =

Village in Staffordshire, England

Coordinates: 52.694444°N 1.65°W

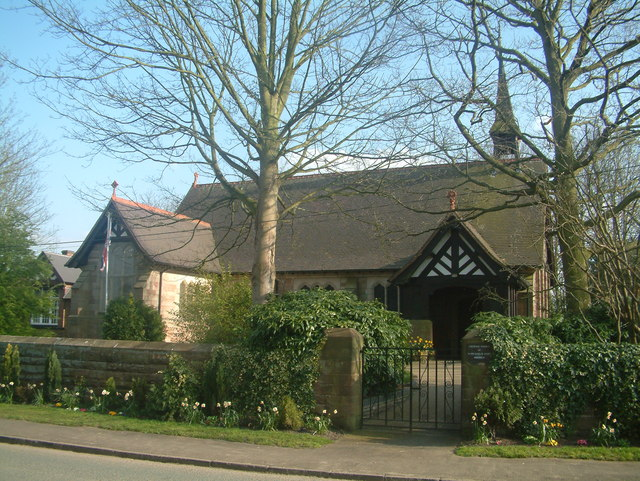
- Church of St Michael and St James

- Location within Staffordshire
- OS grid reference: SK236108
- Civil parish: Clifton Campville
- District: Lichfield
- Shire county: Staffordshire
- Region: West Midlands
- Country: England
- Sovereign state: United Kingdom
- Post town: TAMWORTH
- Postcode district: B79 0
- Dialling code: 01827
- Police: Staffordshire
- Fire: Staffordshire
- Ambulance: West Midlands
- UK Parliament: Tamworth

Haunton is a village in Staffordshire, England. It lies on the River Mease, about 7 miles (11 km) north of Tamworth, 1½ miles east of Harlaston and 1 mile west of Clifton Campville where population details as taken at the 2011 census can be found.

== History ==
The name of the village is believed to be Old English, with the meaning Hagena's (or Hagona's) farm. The chapel of St James the Greater at Haunton is mentioned in Domesday, and Haunton was a chapelry of the parish of St Andrew, Clifton Campville, until the reformation. The chapel then fell into disrepair.

For local government purposes Haunton remained a township of Clifton, and is still in the civil parish of Clifton Campville.

In 1848 the population of Haunton is given as 197.

== Landmarks ==
Haunton includes a number of listed buildings, for example, the Grange, the Church of St Michael and St James and the nursing home (formerly Haunton Hall).

=== Church and convent ===
The more recent history of Haunton Hall is closely linked with the Church of St Michael and St James and a community of Roman Catholic nuns. Charles Edward Mousley inherited the hall in the 1840s, and by 1845 had provided a chapel at the hall dedicated to the Immaculate Conception and available for Catholic services. By 1885 a church dedicated to St Michael had replaced the chapel for services. This church had been built with the support of the Squire of Clifton Campville, Henry John Pye, the son in law of the Anglican bishop Samuel Wilberforce. Pye had once been the Anglican rector of Clifton parish, but had since converted to Catholicism. This early church was soon extended, reusing masonry from the by then ruined Chapel of St James the Greater, and received its current name, adding the former dedication to the new. In 1902 this church was replaced by a new one, designed by Edmund Kirby, with the support of the latest tenant of Haunton Hall, Lady Frances Mostyn, mother of the future archbishop Francis Mostyn. Built of stone, in a neo-Gothic style, it has a small timber bell tower, and contains stained glass from the firm of John Hardman and Company.

In 1904 a group of French nuns, the Sisters of St Joseph of Bordeaux, set up a convent in Haunton Hall. This later became the St. Joseph Convent School for Girls. In 1987 the school closed and the hall is now a nursing home, with the nuns moving to a new convent. The new Convent was specially built next to the original convent and is very much smaller in order to accommodate the diminishing number of Nuns. It has now become vacant and is currently for sale.

== See also ==
- Listed buildings in Clifton Campville
