= Listed buildings in Clifton Campville =

Clifton Campville is a civil parish in the district of Lichfield, Staffordshire, England. It contains 17 listed buildings that are recorded in the National Heritage List for England. Of these, one is at Grade I, the highest of the three grades, two are at Grade II*, the middle grade, and the others are at Grade II, the lowest grade. The parish contains the villages of Clifton Campville and Haunton, and is otherwise rural. The listed buildings consist of two churches, a small country house and its associated coach house and stable, smaller houses, farmhouses and associated structures, a public house, a former convent, and a milepost.

== Key ==
Grade	Criteria
I	Buildings of exceptional interest, sometimes considered to be internationally important
II*	Particularly important buildings of more than special interest
II	Buildings of national importance and special interest

== Buildings ==
Name and location	Photograph	Date	Notes	Grade
St Andrew's Church, Clifton Campville; 52.69419°N 1.62729°W		Early 13th century	The transepts were added later in the 13th century, further additions, including the tower and the south aisle were made in the 14th century, and the church was partly restored in the 19th century. The church has a cruciform plan, consisting of a nave, a south aisle incorporating the remains of the south transept and extending as a chapel, a north transept, north and south porches, a chancel, and a west steeple. The steeple has a tower with three stages, gabled diagonal buttresses, a four-light west window, a semi-octagonal stair turret on the south, and a recessed spire with flying buttresses and two tiers of lucarnes. The east window has a pointed head and five lights.	I
The Green Man; 52.69612°N 1.62127°W	—	15th century	The public house has a timber framed core with cruck construction, but most of it dates from the 18th century. The exterior is in painted brick, with a dentilled eaves band, and a tile roof with crested ridge tiles. There are two storeys and a T-shaped plan, with a main range of three bays, a rear wing, and a lean-to on the right. The porch is gabled and has balustraded arcading, and the windows are casements with segmental heads. Inside there is a substantial cruck truss.	II
The Old Rectory; 52.69500°N 1.62741°W	—	15th century	The rectory was remodelled in about 1600, and again in 1728, and was restored in about 1980. It is in red brick, partly rendered, with quoins, and has a tile roof with coped verges. There are two storeys and an attic, and an H-shaped plan, consisting of a hall range of three bays, and cross-wings, each of three bays. In the wings are Venetian windows, and elsewhere the windows are sashes. The doorway has a moulded surround, and a fanlight cutting through a massive lintel.	II
Hawthorne Cottage; 52.69469°N 1.62785°W	—	Late 16th or early 17th century	The cottage has a timber framed core later encased in brick, and it has a dentilled eaves band and a tile roof. There is one storey and an attic, and three bays. The doorway has a segmental head, there is one casement window, and the other windows are sashes. There is some exposed timber framing externally and internally.	II
Clifton Hall; 52.69604°N 1.61161°W		Early 18th century	A small country house in red brick with stone dressings on a moulded plinth, with rusticated quoins, an eaves cornice, and a hipped slate roof. There are two storeys and fronts of seven and five bays. The central doorway in the north front has a moulded architrave and a swan neck pediment on console brackets, containing a coat of arms. The windows are a mix of sashes and casements with raised keystones and aprons.	II*
Former coach house and stable block, Clifton Hall; 52.69657°N 1.61122°W	—	Early 18th century	The coach house and stable block were altered in the 19th century. The block is in red brick with stone dressings on a moulded plinth, with rusticated quoins, an eaves cornice, and a hipped slate roof. There are two storeys and fronts of seven and five bays. The central doorway in the south front has a moulded architrave and a swan neck pediment on console brackets, containing a coat of arms. The windows are a mix of sashes and casements with raised keystones and aprons. On the north front are two large cart entrances with segmental heads.	II*
The Old Post Office; 52.69633°N 1.62372°W	—	Early 18th century	A house in painted brick with a storey band and a tile roof. There is one storey and an attic, and three bays. The doorway has a gabled porch, the windows are casements with segmental heads, and there is one dormer.	II
Church Farm; 52.69539°N 1.62865°W	—	Mid 18th century	A rear range was added to the farmhouse in the 19th century. It is in red brick with dressings in stone and blue brick, and has tile roofs. The front range has two storeys and an attic and two bays. The central doorway has reeded pilasters and a flat hood. The windows on the front are sashes with segmental heads, and in the attic are blank flat-headed windows. The rear range has three storeys, and a single-storey lean-to, and most of the windows are casements.	II
Manor Farmhouse, Clifton Campville; 52.69607°N 1.62780°W	—	Mid to late 18th century	The farmhouse, which incorporates earlier material, is in brick with a floor band, a dentilled eaves band, and a tile roof. There are two storeys and an attic, four bays, a single-storey extension to the left, and two rear wings. In the centre is a conservatory porch, and the windows are a mix of sashes and casements.	II
Dovecote, Manor Farm, Clifton Campville; 52.69618°N 1.62824°W	—	Mid to late 18th century	The dovecote is in red brick, and has a multi-gabled tile roof with a square cupola. It is about 30 feet (9.1 m) high, with a square plan, and there is a window in each gable.	II
Gazebo, Manor Farm, Clifton Campville; 52.69597°N 1.62716°W	—	Mid to late 18th century	The gazebo is in red brick with a hipped tile roof. It has a square plan, one storey, and one bay, and contains a doorway and casement windows.	II
Manor Farmhouse and stable, Haunton; 52.69536°N 1.64924°W	—	Late 18th century	The farmhouse and stable are in red brick with slate roofs, and were extended in the 19th century. The main range has a dentilled eaves band, two storeys and three bays. It contains two doorways with radial fanlights, and casement windows with segmental heads. At the left a wing projects at right angles; it has three storeys, three bays, and contains casement windows with segmental heads and hood mould bands. The stable continues from the end of the wing, and has two storeys, two bays, and a single-bay extension. It contains a stable door, and in the extension is a loft door.	II
St Joseph's Convent; 52.69439°N 1.65432°W	—	c. 1820	The former convent, was later used for other purposes and has been much extended. The main block is in red brick with a slate roof, and has two storeys and an attic and five bays, the middle bay recessed. The ground floor has an added brick arched verandah containing re-used Doric columns in the centre, and a niche above. The central doorway has a segmental arch, a fanlight and flanking lights. The windows are sashes with wedge lintels, and there are two double flat-headed dormers.	II
Haunton Grange; 52.69505°N 1.65036°W		Early 19th century	A red brick farmhouse with sill bands, a moulded eaves cornice, and a tile roof. There are three storeys, three bays, and a two-storey single-bay extension to the left with a dentilled eaves band. The central doorway has pilasters, a radial fanlight and a pediment, and there is a small doorway to the left with a rectangular fanlight. The windows in the main part are sashes, and in the extension is a casement window.	II
Highfields Farmhouse; 52.67517°N 1.64464°W		Early 19th century	The farmhouse is in red brick with a slate roof. There are three storeys, two parallel ranges, and a front of three bays. In the centre is a gabled porch and a doorway with a rectangular fanlight, and the windows are sashes.	II
Milepost at N.G.R. SK 24771091; 52.69536°N 1.63479°W		Mid to late 19th century	The milepost is on the north side of main road and is in cast iron. It has a triangular plan and a chamfered top. On the top is "CLIFTON" and on the faces are the distances to Clifton Campville, Measham, Ashby-de-la-Zouch, Harlaston, Alrewas, Lichfield, and Burton upon Trent.	II
Church of St. Michael and St. James, Haunton; 52.69446°N 1.65173°W		1885	A Roman Catholic church, the oldest part being the chancel, the rest of the church dating from 1901 to 1902 and designed by Edmund Kirby. It is in stone and has a tile roof with crested roof tiles. The church has a cruciform plan, consisting of a nave, a gabled timber north porch, north and south transepts, and a chancel. Towards the west end is a timber bellcote with a spirelet.	II
