= Hamo de Crevecoeur =

Anglo-Norman nobleman (d. 1263)

Hamo de Crevequer (c. 1190 - 1263) was an Anglo-Norman nobleman who held the office of Lord Warden of the Cinque Ports.

By 1217, Hamo had succeeded to his father's barony. Later, he married Matilda de Avranches, daughter to William de Avranches of Folkestone, later inheriting that land through the marriage. In 1235, he was appointed keeper of the Cinque Ports, apparently as a result of his duties in fighting the Marshal rebellion in 1234. In the same year, he was granted the wardship of extensive lands previously held by Thomas de Canville.

Hamo accompanied Henry III to Gascony and on a campaign in Wales in 1257.

Hamo was succeeded by his grandson, Robert; Hamo had had many sons, but they all died before him.

Preceded by Walter de Burgsted	Lord Warden of the Cinque Ports; 1263	Succeeded by Humphrey de Bohun, 3rd Earl of Hereford
