= Listed buildings in Harlaston =

Harlaston is a civil parish in the district of Lichfield, Staffordshire, England. The parish contains eleven buildings that are recorded in the National Heritage List for England. Of these, three are listed at Grade II*, the middle of the three grades, and the others are at Grade II, the lowest grade. The parish contains the village of Harlaston and the smaller settlement of Haselour, and the surrounding countryside. The listed buildings consist of a church, a small country house and an associated chapel, houses and cottages, a farmhouse, two mileposts, and a telephone kiosk.

== Key ==
Grade	Criteria
II*	Particularly important buildings of more than special interest
II	Buildings of national importance and special interest

== Buildings ==
Name and location	Photograph	Date	Notes	Grade
St Matthew's Church; 52.69588°N 1.68336°W		Early 13th century	The earliest part of the church is the tower, the rest was designed by Ewan Christian and built in 1882–83. The tower is in sandstone, the body of the church is in brick, and the bellcote on the tower is timber framed. The church consists of a nave, a south timber-framed porch, a chancel, a northeast vestry, and a west tower. The tower has one stage, a hipped roof, and the bellcote has a pyramidal roof. The windows in the tower are lancets, elsewhere they are in Decorated style, the east window having three lights.	II*
Chapel east of Haselour Hall; 52.69427°N 1.69547°W	—	14th century (probable)	The chapel, which was restored in about 1885, is in sandstone and has a tile roof. There is a rectangular plan, with diagonal buttresses, and a small square bellcote with a pyramidal roof at the west end. The three-light east window has a pointed head and a hood mould, and it contains Geometric tracery. There are doors on the north and south sides, both with segmental heads.	II*
Haselour Hall; 52.69410°N 1.69586°W	—	Late 16th century	A small country house that was restored in 1885, it is timber framed, partly roughcast, and has a tile roof. There are two storeys and an attic, and an L-shaped plan, with a main range of five bays, the middle bay projecting, a rear wing, and further rear extensions. The windows are mullioned and transomed and contain casements with leaded lights. The extensions link the hall to the chapel.	II*
The Manor House, Main Road; 52.69471°N 1.68336°W	—	c. 1600	The house, which was extended in the 17th century and altered in the 19th century, is timber framed and has tile roofs. There are two storeys and an attic, and a T-shaped plan with a front range of two bays, and a rear wing. The upper storey of the front range is jettied with a chamfered and moulded bressumer. In the centre is a gabled porch with shaped bargeboards and a finial. The windows are casements, and above the upper floor windows are gables with shaped bargeboards and finials.	II
The Manor, Manor Lane; 52.69557°N 1.68244°W	—	Late 17th century	The house was remodelled and extended in the 19th century. The original part is timber framed, the extension is in brick and roughcast, and the roof is tiled. There are two storeys and a T-shaped plan, with the extension at right angles to the original range. The windows are casements, and above the door is a re-used datestone. Inside the house is exposed timber framing.	II
Dunimere Farmhouse; 52.68205°N 1.67761°W	—	18th century	The farmhouse is in brick, partly rendered, and has a tile roof. There are two storeys and an attic, a main range, a north gabled wing, and a two-storey service wing on the left. In the north front is a doorway with pilasters, and a bowed bay window with an entablature. The windows are mullioned and transomed.	II
The Homestead, Main Road; 52.69676°N 1.68117°W	—	Mid to late 18th century	A red brick house with a dentilled eaves band and a tile roof. There are three storeys, two bays, a single-storey extension to the right, and a rear outshut. The central doorway has a bracketed hood, and the windows are casements, those in the lower two floors with segmental heads.	II
Haselour House; 52.69369°N 1.69816°W	—	Late 18th century	A farmhouse in red brick with a floor band and a hipped tile roof. There are two storeys and an attic, a front of five bays, and rear extensions. The central doorway has a fanlight, the windows are sashes, and there are three hipped dormers.	II
Milepost at NGR SK 20721052; 52.69201°N 1.69486°W	—	Mid to late 19th century	The milepost is on the north side of the road. It is in cast iron, and has a triangular plan and a chamfered top. On the top is "HARLASTON" and the sides indicate the distances to Harlaston, Clifton, Measham, Ashby de la Zouch, Alrewas, Lichfield, and Burton upon Trent.	II
Milepost at NGR SK 21741110; 52.69714°N 1.67974°W		Mid to late 19th century	The milepost is on the north side of Haunton Road. It is in cast iron, and has a triangular plan and a chamfered top. On the top is "HARLASTON" and the sides indicate the distances to Clifton, Measham, Ashby de la Zouch, Alrewas, Lichfield, and Burton upon Trent.	II
Telephone kiosk south of St Michael's Church; 52.69558°N 1.68319°W	—	1935	A K6 type telephone kiosk, designed by Giles Gilbert Scott. Constructed in cast iron with a square plan and a dome, it has three unperforated crowns in the top panels.	II
