= Francis Pipe-Wolferstan =

English cricketer

Personal information
- Full name: Francis Stafford Pipe-Wolferstan
- Born: 14 October 1826; Statfold, Staffordshire, England
- Died: 3 November 1900 (aged 74); Statfold, Staffordshire, England
- Batting: Unknown

Domestic team information
- Years: Team
- 1846: Oxford University

Career statistics
Competition	First-class
Matches	1
Runs scored	7
Batting average	7.00
100s/50s	–/–
Top score	7
Balls bowled	–
Wickets	–
Bowling average	–
5 wickets in innings	–
10 wickets in match	–
Best bowling	–
Catches/stumpings	–/–
- Source: Cricinfo, 26 December 2013

Francis Stafford Pipe-Wolferstan (14 October 1826 – 3 November 1900) was an English cricketer. Pipe-Wolferstan's batting style is unknown.

Born at Statfold, Staffordshire, Pipe-Wolferstan was educated at Eton College before studying law at Balliol College, Oxford. While studying at the university he made a single appearance in first-class cricket for Oxford University against the Marylebone Cricket Club in 1846 at Lord's. In a match which Oxford University won by an innings and 17 runs, he scored 7 runs in his only innings, before being dismissed by William Lillywhite.

He was a member of the Inner Temple and was a barrister until 1871. Between 1871 and 1891 he was a farmer of 796 acres and employed seventeen people. He was resident at Statfold Hall in his home village and died there on 3 November 1900.
