= River Mease =

River in the Midlands of England

Mease
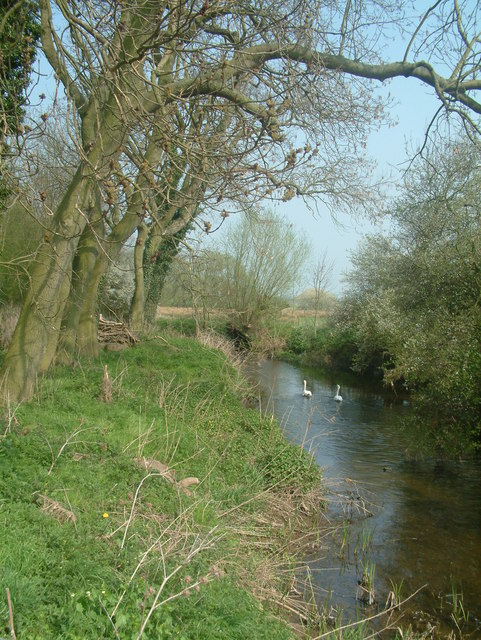
- River Mease south of Lullington, near Clifton Campville

Location
- Country: England
- Region: Leicestershire, Derbyshire, Staffordshire

Physical characteristics
- Source
  - location: Nr. Norton Juxta Twycross, Leicestershire, England
  - elevation: 130 m (430 ft)
- Mouth: River Trent
  - location: Nr. Croxall, Staffordshire, England
  - coordinates: 52°43′0″N 1°43′0″W
- Length: 25 km (16 mi)

Basin features
- Tributaries
  - left: Meadowbrook (Appleby Magna)
  - right: West Brook, Gilwiskaw Brook (pronounced jill-a-whiskey), Sewerage Treatment Works Discharge

The River Mease is a lowland clay river in the Midlands area of England. It flows through the counties of Leicestershire, Derbyshire and Staffordshire and forms the administrative border between these counties for parts of its length.

The river and the lower part of one of its tributaries, the Gilwiskaw Brook (pronounced jill-a-whiskey) are both protected as "one of the best examples of an unspoilt meandering lowland river". The river receives protection under European Union law as a Special Area of Conservation (SAC), and protection under UK law as a Site of Special Scientific Interest (SSSI).

== Description ==
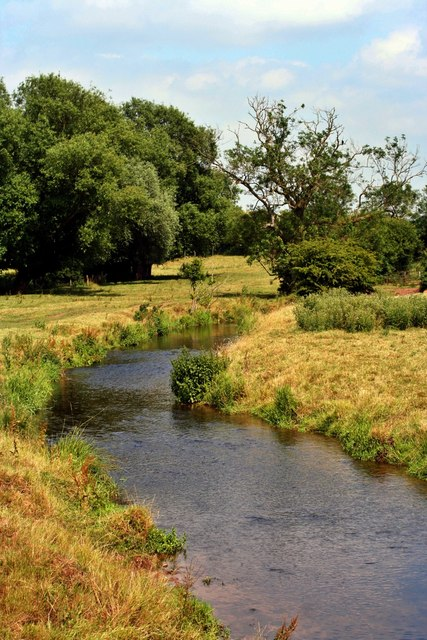
The River Mease near Clifton Campville

The Mease is formed by a confluence of smaller streams near the village of Norton Juxta Twycross in North West Leicestershire. It flows westwards for approximately 16 miles (25 km) across a largely rural and agricultural landscape to its confluence with the River Trent at Croxall in Staffordshire, with its waters eventually reaching the North Sea via the Trent and the Humber Estuary.

The river flows through areas underlain with bands of Triassic Period sandstone and Mercia Mudstone. After flowing through a wide valley between the villages of Measham and Appleby Magna, the land opens up into flat countryside: the river's path is not of steep topography, meaning the river flows gently and meanders "passively".

The path of the river has changed little over time. Historical alterations were made near the villages of Clifton Campville, Harlaston and Croxall, with the addition of weirs and leats to serve mills (now demolished or non-operational).

In the 1980s, work was undertaken to deepen the Mease between the village of Measham and its confluence with the River Trent: this was part of a "comprehensive arterial drainage scheme" which was designed to allow land drains to drain into the river.

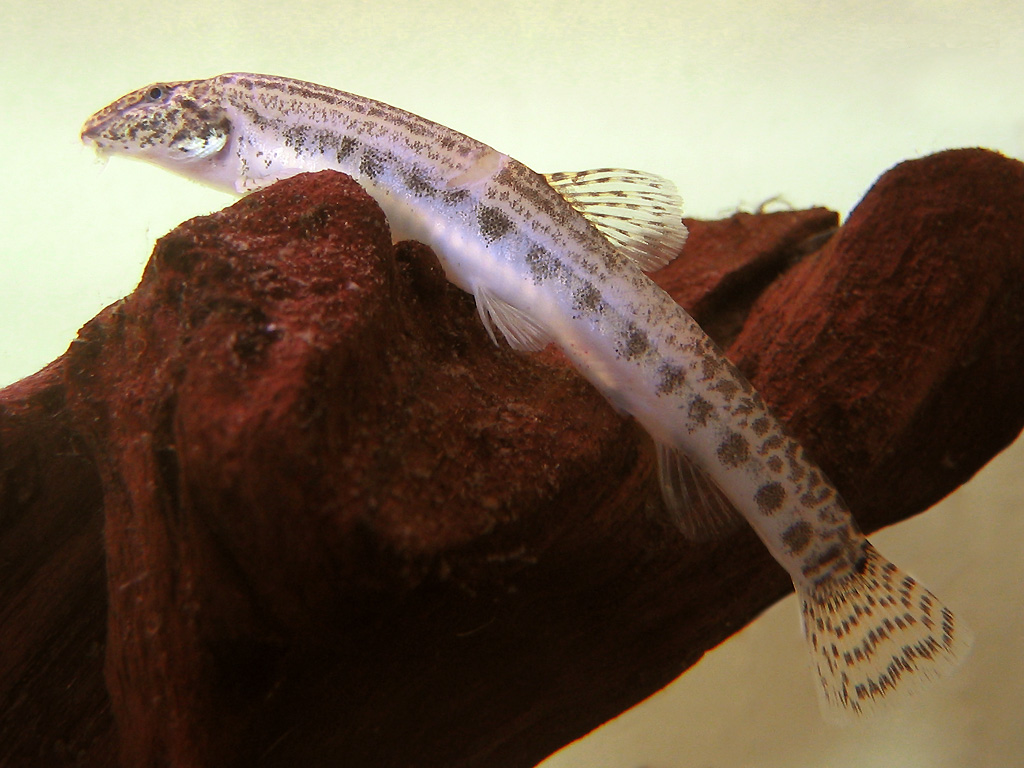
Spined loach (Cobitis taenia)

The village of Measham is named after the river, meaning the homestead on the River Mease.

== Wildlife ==
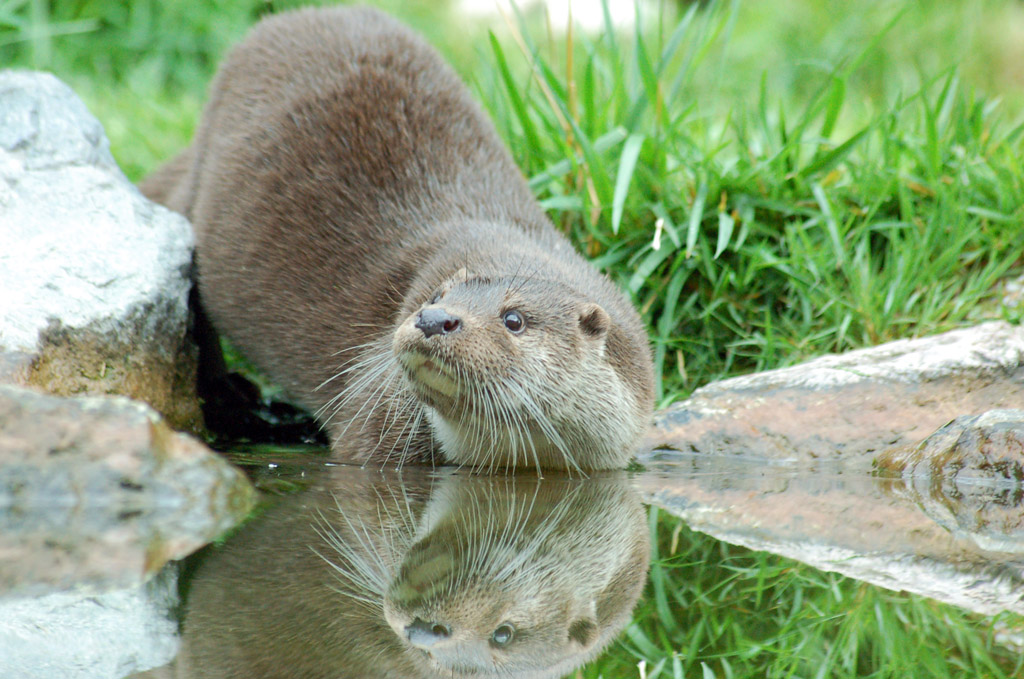
European otter

The river is a designated site of special scientific interest due to the fish that it supports. Of particular interest are the resident populations of spined loach (Cobitis taenia) and European bullhead (Cottus gobio) (two internationally notable species of native freshwater fish with a restricted distribution in England), white-clawed crayfish (Austropotamobius pallipes) and European otters (Lutra lutra).

The most numerous fish in the river are chub and roach; with dace, pike, perch and gudgeon also recorded.

The river's wildlife is highly sensitive to pollution and fish numbers have fallen since 2007.

Natural England's report in February 2010 reported that the river's two special fish (spined loach and European bullhead) were both being adversely affected by pollution, both in terms of having lower than expected population sizes, and the river failing to provide favourable conditions for them to live.

Other wildlife, such as the white-clawed crayfish, have been pushed along the river to its confluence with the River Trent. White-clawed crayfish numbers have also been negatively affected by infiltrating foreign American signal crayfish, which have entered the river from a pool at Catton Hall.

== Pollution ==
The river receives the outflow of nine Sewerage Treatment plants (located at Smisby, Donisthorpe, Packington, Measham, Netherseal, Edingale, Snarestone, Clifton Campville, Overseal, Norton juxta Twycross, Annwell Place and Chilcote), as well as the outflow from ten private sewerage operations. In addition the river receives the outflow from several opencast coal mines. The river has suffered reduced fish numbers since 2007 when the Environment Agency stopped artificially restocking the river. The Environment Agency are instead trying to encourage a natural recovery following several "pollution incidents".

The main pollutant is thought to be phosphates and the main cause of the pollution is thought to be the Sewerage Treatment Plant at Packington, which is operating at full capacity, leading to "overflow" being released into the river via the Gilwiskaw Brook. The water quality of most of the river is recorded as "moderate"; the section between Harlaston Bridge and the confluence of the River Trent is recorded as "poor".

Following pressure from the Environment Agency, North West Leicestershire District Council refused to grant planning permission for any construction work which would add to the sewage outflow, including housing developments, hotels and business parks.

In November 2012, following fears that the situation was damaging the local economy, North West Leicestershire District Council announced a new plan. The council's plan would not stop the pollution of the river, nor prevent the additional outflow and pollution from new developments; instead developers would have to make a one-off "significant contribution" of between £225 and £250 per new house built. South Derbyshire District Council and Lichfield District Council have both made similar proposals, with South Derbyshire planning a one-off charge between £86 and £354 per new house. The money from these schemes would then be used on projects designed to improve the river's water quality.

These schemes have been heavily criticised as they do not prevent or reduce sewage outflow into the river, and, with resumed building, outflow and pollution will increase. A proposed development of houses on Leicester Road, Ashby-de-la-Zouch, is predicted to increase sewage outflow by 110 cubic metres a day; with an added 37 cubic metres a day of surface water runoff also added to the river. This has added to fears about worsening flooding as large areas of the Gilwiskaw Brook and the River Mease regularly flood after heavy rain.

== Places along the River Mease ==
In order that the river passes through them

- Norton Juxta Twycross - Nearest settlement to the source
- Snarestone - Passes to the west of the village
- Measham - Forms the south-west boundary of the village
- Stretton en le Field - Passes just over a quarter of a mile north of the village
- Netherseal - Forms southern boundary of the village
- Clifton Campville - Passes just north of the village
- Haunton - Passes just north of the village
- Harlaston - Passes just north of the village
- Edingale - Passes just south of the village
- Croxall - Forms the south-west boundary of the village

- The river joins the Trent north of Croxall.

== See also ==
- List of rivers of England
