= Thomas de Canville =

Anglo-Norman landowner and judge

Sir Thomas Canville (died 1234), also written de Camville, was an Anglo-Norman landowner and judge in medieval England.

== Origins ==
The family originated from Hugh I (died after 1098), seigneur of Canville-les-Deux-Églises in Normandy, whose elder son Hugh II inherited the ancestral lands in the Pays de Caux while the younger son Richard I Canville went to England around 1135. It is possible that Hugh II, who remained in Normandy, was the father of Hugh III (died about 1194) who married Christina, daughter of William le Moine, and held lands at Godington in Oxfordshire, Shenfield and Fobbing in Essex, Westerham in Kent and unspecified places in Buckinghamshire and Huntingdonshire. Their son was Thomas.

== Career ==
Probably born before 1175, he served under King Richard I in Normandy in 1194. By April 1206 he had been knighted and was one of the panel of knights holding land in Kent who were eligible to sit in the Grand Assize. In or before 1208, he gave land at Fobbing to the nuns of Barking Abbey.

Though he normally met calls for military service by payment in cash, in 1210 he went in person with King John to Ireland. By the end of 1215, when he joined the rebel barons in the First Barons' War, the king ordered the confiscation of his land at Godington. Once the civil war ended, he made his peace with the new government of King Henry III and by the end of 1217 had regained his lands. A false report of his death in 1220 led to his under-age heir and lands being put under the care of Philip Oldcotes.

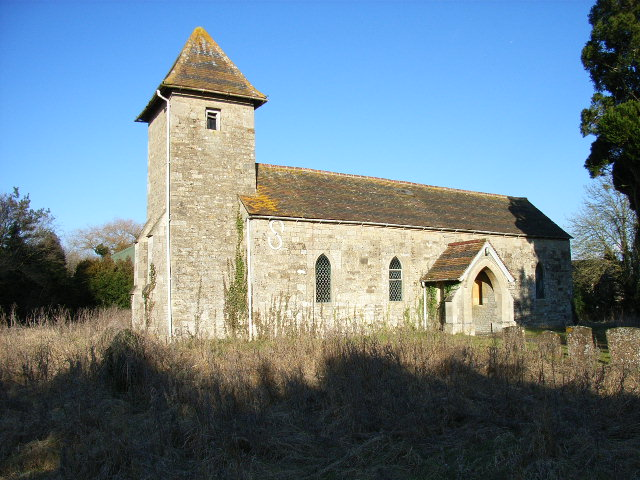
Holy Trinity church, Godington

After the death of his mother, he had given Godington church to the nuns of Elstow Abbey, but by 1221 tried to reclaim it. A lawsuit next year resulted in him confirming his grant, in return for which the nuns promised to pray for him and his heirs. In 1227 he secured the right to hold a weekly market at Westerham and both a weekly market and a yearly fair at Fobbing.

In that year he was named a justice in eyre for Essex, Kent and Hertfordshire, serving under Martin Pattishall. Promotion followed in 1228 when he acted as a justice of the Common Bench, though he does not seem to have sat after 1229. The next year he did not serve on the English expedition to Brittany, but in 1232 was one of those responsible for collecting tax in Kent.

Still alive in July 1234, he was dead by 22 January 1235.

== Family ==
With his wife Agnes, who after his death married the Essex landowner William Marney, he had sons called Robert and John, who were born after 1214. Thomas may have had an earlier marriage without surviving children.

After his death, the wardship of the heir Robert together with the right to hold his inherited lands and choose his bride, was sold to Hamo de Crevecoeur for the considerable sum of £400. Sir Robert married Joan, probably a daughter of Hamo's, and they had a son Roger who died after 1285. Joan survived him.
