= Church of St Andrew, Clifton Campville =

Church of St Andrew
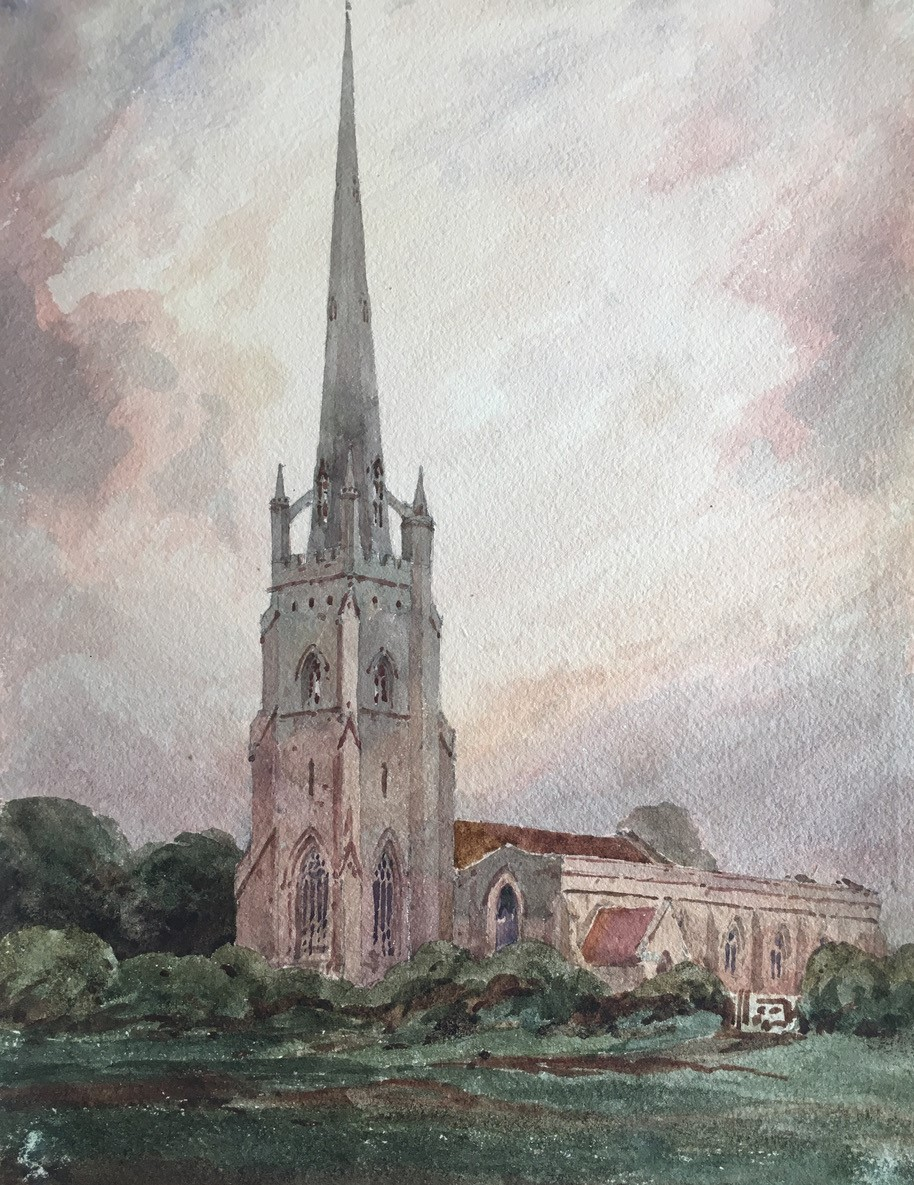
- Watercolour by John Louis Petit, 1845
- Church of St Andrew
- 52.6938°N 1.6278°W
- OS grid reference: SK 252 107
- Location: Clifton Campville, Staffordshire
- Country: England
- Denomination: Anglican

Architecture
- Functional status: Active
- Heritage designation: Grade I
- Designated: 27 February 1964
- Architectural type: Church
- Style: Early English, Gothic

Administration
- Province: Canterbury
- Diocese: Lichfield

Clergy
- Rector: Revd Garry Thompson

The Church of St Andrew is a Grade I listed church in the village of Clifton Campville, Staffordshire. It was built in the 13th and 14th centuries. The tall spire is a notable feature, visible from a great distance.

== History ==
A church here was mentioned in the Domesday Book of 1086, but nothing remains of the building. There was a two-cell church (consisting of nave and chancel) built about 1200; in the late 13th century, north and south transepts were added.

In the 14th century the building was enlarged: the south aisle was created, incorporating the earlier south transept; an extra bay was added to the chancel which comprises the present sanctuary; the lady chapel was built on the south side adjoining the chancel; the tower and spire were built. The church seen today is essentially the building of this period.

== Interior ==
The masonry of the 14th century is of dressed stone of ashlar quality, the 13th-century stone is roughly squared; this difference is visible in the north wall and remnants of the original south wall. The south wall was replaced by a three-bay arcade to the south aisle.

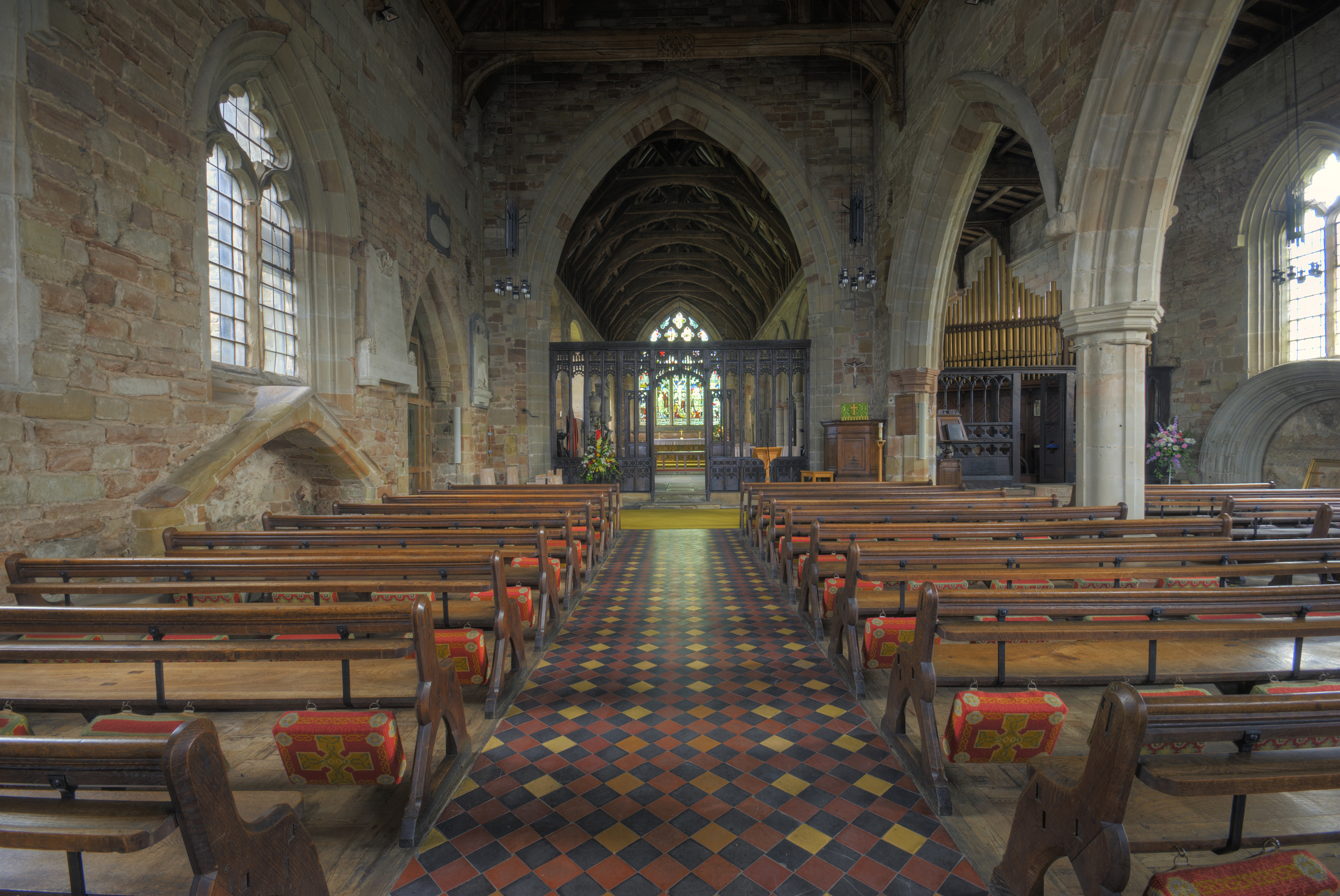
The nave, looking east towards the chancel; beyond the arcade on the right is the south aisle

In the north wall, the westernmost of the two decorated windows has glass from the 15th century. The north transverse chapel, occupying the north transept, was probably created in the late 13th century; above it, accessed by a spiral staircase from the chancel, is a Priest's Room, with medieval details including fireplace and garderobe.

The oak rood screen between nave and chancel is 15th-century, and has perpendicular tracery; there are 17th-century wooden doors in the screen. The chancel and sanctuary are 55 feet (17 m) long. Behind the choir stalls are 14th-century misericords, carved with foliage and figure heads.

On the south wall of the south aisle is a wall painting from the early 14th century, depicting Christ seated on a throne, and Mary seated and crowned, and attendant figures of a knight and a lady.

=== The lady chapel ===
The lady chapel was built in the 14th century; its creation is mentioned in the Lichfield Episcopal Registers of 1361: "Ordination of a Chantry on the South side of the church in honour of the Holy Trinity, Mary the Mother of God... for Sir Richard Stafford and his wife Maud, and for the soul of Isabel, his former wife." Sir Richard Stafford of Clifton, and Isabel Vernon, were the parents of Edmund Stafford (1344–1419), who held the rectorship of Clifton Campville his family lands, and later became Bishop of Exeter. A tomb under an arch in the north wall of the nave is thought to be the tomb of Isabel, who died c. 1350. A tomb under an arch in the south wall of the south aisle is thought to be of Sir Richard Stafford, who died in 1380.

There are original wooden screens, through which you enter the chapel from the south aisle or the chancel. In the centre of the chapel is an alabaster tomb chest, a monument to John Vernon of Harlaston, who died in 1545, and his wife Ellen; they are shown recumbent.

The organ is in the chapel; built by Brindley & Foster in 1874, it was installed in the church in 1907 and enlarged in 1975.

== Restoration ==
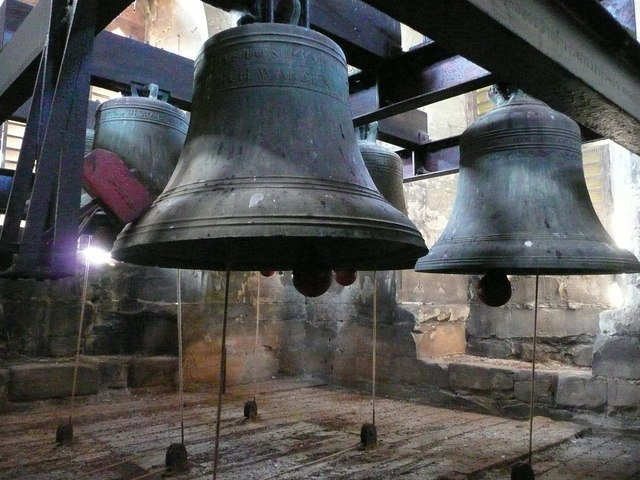
The church bells

The church was restored in the 1860s by George Edmund Street; this involved replacement of the medieval roof. There was restoration by W. D. Caröe in 1910: this included a new north porch, work to the nave roof, north transept and the tower, and rehanging of the bells.

In 1984 the spire was struck by lightning, with much damage to the church. Repairs were completed in 1987.

== See also ==
- Grade I listed churches in Staffordshire
- Listed buildings in Clifton Campville
