= Thorpe Constantine =

Village in Staffordshire, England

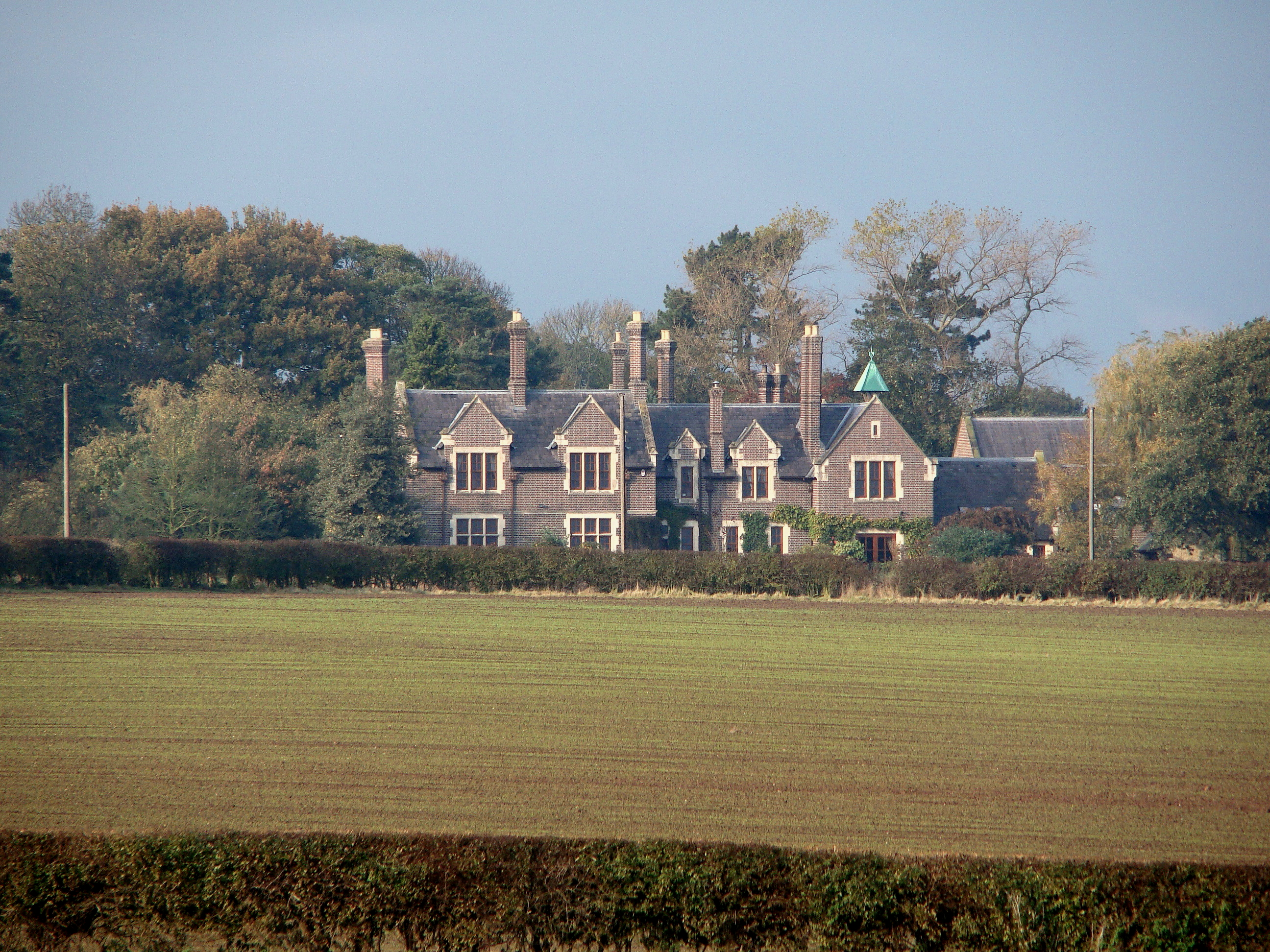
- Former rectory

- Location within Staffordshire
- OS grid reference: SK258089
- Civil parish: Thorpe Constantine
- District: Lichfield
- Shire county: Staffordshire
- Region: West Midlands
- Country: England
- Sovereign state: United Kingdom
- Post town: TAMWORTH
- Postcode district: B79
- Dialling code: 01827
- Police: Staffordshire
- Fire: Staffordshire
- Ambulance: West Midlands
- UK Parliament: Tamworth

Thorpe Constantine is a small village and civil parish in Staffordshire, England. It lies about 6 miles (10 km) north-east of Tamworth and 6 miles south-west of Measham. The nucleus of the parish is the Thorpe estate.

== History ==
The first part of the name is believed to be the Old Norse word thorp with the meaning outlying farm, indicative of the village's location within the Danelaw. The second element comes from the name of the family that was in possession of the land in the 13th century.

The population of the estate parish is given as 42 in 1848, the land covering 953 acres (386 ha). In 1870 it is given as 54, living in 5 houses.

== Governance ==
The parish of Thorpe Constantine became part of Tamworth Poor Law Union in 1836. In 1894 it became a civil parish within the newly constituted Tamworth Rural District. During the boundary changes of 1934 the civil parish was enlarged with the addition of Statfold and Syerscote, and became part of Lichfield Rural District.

In 1974 it became part of the new non-metropolitan district of Lichfield. The parish council meets jointly with Clifton Campville.

Electorally the parish is part of Mease and Tame ward of Lichfield District, and lies within the parliamentary constituency of Tamworth.

== Landmarks ==
Also on the estate lies other properties such as Constaine house, The Old Kennels, The old Parsonage, The Orchard, Gorse Farm and Gorse Fields along with various stable blocks converted into office and business space and farm outbuilding and barns.

Other Local properties used to be part of the slowly diminishing estate before being sold of such as Glebe House, The Coach house, Thorpe Grange, Gardeners cottages 1 & 2 and most recently Plaz David.

=== Thorpe Hall ===
The manor house of Thorpe Hall is a privately owned Georgian style country mansion, and a Grade II listed building.

William Ives, a successful Leicestershire vintner, bought Thorpe in 1631. His daughter and co-heir Jane married Richard Inge of Leicester, and the house became the Inge family home. The Inges were a prominent local family, five members of which served as High Sheriff of Staffordshire. Family members were Rectors of Netherseal and of Thorpe Constantine.

Ives had built a three-storey, five-bayed mansion at Thorpe in 1651. In 1790 when another Inge family seat at Drakelow, Derbyshire was abandoned, Thorpe Hall was enlarged and improved. Two three-bayed, two-storeyed wings were added, and the main central block was decorated with balustrading and an entrance porch.

The 1881 census discloses Rev George Inge and his family in residence with a staff of twenty-one. The family remained in occupation until at least 1925. Following the death of Hilda Mary Inge in 1953 the estate passed to the Lillingston family of Localsh. George David Inge-Innes-Lillingston was High Sheriff of Staffordshire in 1966.

The property is now occupied by Hugh Inge-Innes-Lillingston and his wife Catherine.

=== Church of St Constantine ===
The parish church, dedicated to St Constantine, is a Grade II listed building.

The church is in the grounds of the Hall, and has been an "estate church" since the 18th century, the parish being owned by the estate. These days it is only occasionally used for services. It is, however, a substantial building, with separate nave and chancel. Extensively rebuilt in 1883, and prior to that in the 18th century, parts of it may go back to the 14th century, including the tower with spire.

The Inge family, owners of the estate, often supplied the rectors too.

== Other settlements ==
The expansion of the civil parish in 1934 incorporated the civil parishes of Statfold and Syerscote, both of which settlements go back to early mediaeval times, though these days must be counted as former settlements.

=== Statfold ===
Statfold is an abandoned village, of which little trace now remains, though the listed manor house and church are still extant. Nowadays, the church has the status of a chapel; it is listed Grade II*.

=== Syerscote ===
Syerscote ^{52°39′55″N 1°40′20″W}, roughly 3 miles (5 km) north-east of Tamworth and 3 miles west of Thorpe, is a former township of the parish of St Editha, Tamworth. In 1836 it became part of Tamworth Poor Law Union; in 1866 it became an independent civil parish within the union. In 1894 it entered Tamworth Rural District and in 1934 became part of Thorpe Constantine civil parish. In 1848 the population was 46, on 480 acres (190 ha). The farmhouse of Syerscote Manor is listed Grade II.

The name is believed to derive from Old English, with the meaning of Sigeric's cottages. In the Middle Ages Syerscote was a prebend that funded one of 5 canons to the then collegiate Church of St Editha, Tamworth. In 1291 this income was valued at £4 a year. These days Syerscote is within the Church of England parish of St Leonard, Wigginton.

== See also ==
- Listed buildings in Thorpe Constantine

== Other sources ==
- Inge family papers at Staffordshire County Record Office reference D878 3211
- 1881 census records
