= Listed buildings in Thorpe Constantine =

Thorpe Constantine is a civil parish in the district of Lichfield, Staffordshire, England. It contains eight buildings recorded in the National Heritage List for England. Of these, one is listed at Grade II*, the middle of the three grades, and the others are at Grade II, the lowest grade. The parish contains the small village of Thorpe Constantine and the former village of Statfold, and is otherwise rural. The listed buildings consist of two churches, a memorial in a churchyard, two small country houses and associated structures, a farmhouse, and a row of cottages.

== Key ==
Grade	Criteria
II*	Particularly important buildings of more than special interest
II	Buildings of national importance and special interest

== Buildings ==
Name and location	Photograph	Date	Notes	Grade
All Saints Church, Statfold; 52.66177°N 1.64999°W	—	12th century	A small chapel with most of the fabric dating from the 14th century, there were alterations in the 17th century, and a restoration in 1906. The oldest material is reddish conglomerate, most of the rest is freestone, and the roof is tiled. The church consists of a nave and a chancel in one unit. The west door is late Norman, dating from the 12th century, and the south doorway is in Decorated style.	II*
St Constantine's Church, Thorpe Constantine; 52.67572°N 1.61796°W		14th century (probable)	An estate church, the oldest part being the steeple, with the rest of the church, designed by John Oldrid Scott, dating from 1883. The church is built in stone and has a tile roof. It consists of a nave, a lower chancel, a northwest vestry, and a west steeple. The steeple has a tower with three stages, a west doorway with a pointed head, a plain parapet, a recessed spire, and two tiers of lucarnes. The lower tier of lucarnes have crocketed gablets, gargoyles and foliated finials.	II
Thorpe Hall; 52.67598°N 1.61935°W	—	1651	A small country house, with a north wing added in 1800, a south wing in 1812, and a further extension in 1870. The house is rendered on a sandstone plinth, with pilaster strips, sill bands, an eaves cornice, a parapet, and hipped slate roofs. The main block has three storeys and a basement, and five bays. Flanking flights of steps with a wrought iron balustrade and square piers on an arch with rusticated voussoirs lead up to the central doorway, which has an architrave, a fanlight and a pediment. The wings have two storeys and three bays, and there is a single-story two-bay extension. The windows are sashes.	II
Statfold Hall; 52.66083°N 1.64978°W	—	c. 1700	A small country house incorporating some earlier material, and with alterations and extensions in 1777 and 1819. It is in red brick on a plinth and has slate roofs. There are two storeys and an attic, and the house has a main range of three bays, a two-bay south wing, extensions at the rear, and an octagonal stair turret with a hipped roof. In the centre of the main range is a porch and a doorway with a cornice decorated with a scroll motif. The porch is flanked by three-light bay windows, and most of the windows are sashes.	II
Thorpe Gorse Cottages; 52.66044°N 1.63761°W		18th century	A row of three cottages that was extended in the 19th century. The original part is in stone, the extension is in brick, and the roof is tiled. There are two storeys and five bays, and the windows are casements. The doorways and windows in the original part have lintels with keystones, and in the extension they have segmental heads.	II
Wolferston memorial 52.66170°N 1.64980°W	—	c. 1775	The memorial is in the churchyard of All Saints Church, and is to the memory of members of the Wolferston family. It is a pedestal tomb in stone, and consists of a triangular concave-sided pedestal with a carved ram's head on each corner, surmounted by a giant urn decorated with swags and medallions, and capped by a ball finial.	II
Syerscote Manor Farmhouse; 52.66517°N 1.67092°W	—	Late 18th century	A red brick farmhouse with a floor band, an eaves cornice, and a slate roof. There are three storeys, an L-shaped plan, and a front of three bays. On the front is a Tuscan porch and a doorway with a fanlight, and the windows are sashes with lintels and keystones.	II
Terrace retaining wall and steps, Thorpe Hall; 52.67587°N 1.61969°W	—	Mid 19th century	The terrace wall has a brick base and a stone balustrade, and runs for about 70 yards (64 m). The balustrade is latticed, and it contains panelled piers surmounted by urns. In the centre of the wall is an opening flanked by two large square panelled piers and reached by stone steps.	II
