= John de Berewyk =

John de Berewyk (died 1312) was an English judge. He was entrusted with the charge of the vacant abbey of St. Edmund in 1278–79, and of the see of Lincoln during the interval between the death of Benedict (Richard de Gravesend) in 1279, and the appointment of his successor, Oliver Sutton. He acted as one of the assessors of the thirtieth for the counties south of the Trent in 1263, and in Michaelmas 1284 is mentioned as treasurer to Queen Eleanor. In 1294 he was one of her executors. A memorandum entered on the roll of parliament in 1290 records the delivery by him of a 'roll of peace and concord' made between the chancellor and scholars of the university and the mayor and burgesses of the city of Oxford to the clerk of the king's wardrobe for safe custody. He was summoned to parliament as a justice between 1295 and 1309, having been appointed a justice itinerant in 1292. In 1305 he was nominated receiver of petitions to the king in parliament emanating from Guernsey, with power to answer all petitions that did not require the personal attention of the king. At the time of his death in 1312, de Berewyk possessed estates in Surrey, Essex, Wiltshire, Hampshire, and Norfolk. He left an infant heir.
