= Richard Stafford, 1st Baron Stafford of Clifton =

English soldier and diplomat

Richard Stafford
- Died: 13 August 1380
- Buried: St Andrew's Church, Clifton Campville
- Noble family: Stafford
- Spouses: Isabel Vernon; Maud Stafford
- Issue: Sir Richard Stafford; Edmund Stafford; Sir Thomas Stafford; Maud Stafford; Katherine Stafford
- Father: Edmund Stafford, 1st Baron Stafford
- Mother: Margaret Basset

Arms of Baron Stafford of Clifton: Or, a chevron gules, a crescent for difference.

Richard Stafford, 1st Baron Stafford of Clifton (died 13 August 1380), Lord of Clifton, was an English soldier and diplomat during the Hundred Years' War. He was the second son of Edmund Stafford, 1st Baron Stafford and Margaret Basset, and the younger brother of Ralph Stafford, 1st Earl of Stafford.

He was the founder of the Staffords of Clifton, a cadet branch of the House of Stafford.

== Early life ==
Richard Stafford was the second son of Edmund Stafford, 1st Baron Stafford and Margaret Basset, the daughter of Ralph Basset, 1st Lord Basset of Drayton. His elder brother was Ralph Stafford, 1st Earl of Stafford.

== Career ==
Stafford was involved in the French campaigns of King Edward III of England during the Hundred Years' War. His actions during the war are at times unclear, for the contemporary historian Jean Froissart often confused Richard with his brother Ralph. In 1337, Stafford was sent with others on an embassy to the courts of William II, Count of Hainaut and Reginald II, Count of Guelders, as well as Louis IV, Holy Roman Emperor.

In November 1337, Richard participated in the victory at Cadzand and was in the king's army at present at the bloodless meeting of the English and French armies in October 1339 at Vironfosse. His brother held command of the English forces during the Gascon campaign of 1345, and Richard was among the prominent leaders of the campaign. During the campaign, Stafford participated in the siege of Bergerac, commanded the garrison at Libourne, and assisted in the relief of Auberoche, and the attack on La Réole. Stafford also participated in the Battle of Crécy in 1346; after the battle, Stafford and Reginald de Cobham, 1st Baron Cobham were tasked to count the slain. He was also at the Siege of Calais between 1346 and 1347.

In 1355, Stafford followed the Edward the Black Prince to Gascony and participated in his expedition into France in 1355. He was sent to England with letters in December, but rejoined the prince's army afterwards and fought at the Battle of Poitiers on 19 September 1356. Stafford and his brother accompanied Edward III on his expedition to France in October 1359. He was appointed to the office of Seneschal of Gascony in 1361 and served until 8 June 1362. During 1366, Richard was appointed to go on an embassy, accompanied by his son Richard, to the papal court. Summoned to parliament, as Baron Stafford of Clifton, on 8 January 1371, and regularly summoned until 1379. He died on 13 August 1380 and was buried at the St Andrew's Church, Clifton Campville, Staffordshire. A memorial brass is located within St Peter's Church, Elford, Staffordshire.

== Marriage and issue ==
Richard married (1st) Isabel, heiress of Clifton-Camville, daughter of Richard de Vernon and Maud de Camville, they had the following known issue:

- Sir Richard Stafford, Knt., married Alice Blount. He died without issue before his father.
- Edmund Stafford (1344 – 1419), Bishop of Exeter, Chancellor of England, Keeper of the Privy Seal.
- Sir Thomas Stafford, Knt., Marshal of Ireland (died c.1397). He married Alice Sulney and had one son, Thomas, Esq. (died 1425).
- Maud Stafford, contracted to marry Thomas de Arderne, but died before reaching the age of 11 [see Papal Regs.: Letters 3 (1897): 352].
- Katherine Stafford, married Thomas de Arderne, Knt., of Elford, Staffordshire, and had issue.

He married (2nd) Maud ____, but they had no children.

Stafford also had the following illegitimate issue:

- Sir Nicholas Stafford, Knt., of Throwley, Staffordshire (died 1394), married Elizabeth Meverell, died without issue.
- John Stafford

== Citations ==
Peerage of England
New creation	Baron Stafford of Clifton; 1371 – 1380	Succeeded by Edmund Stafford
