= Harlaston =

Village in Staffordshire, England

Coordinates: 52.696°N 1.683°W

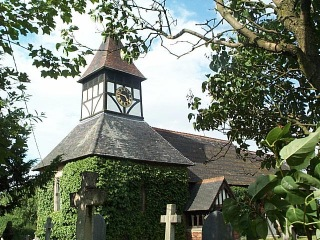
- St Matthew's Church

- Location within Staffordshire
- Population: 394 (2011)
- OS grid reference: SK215109
- Civil parish: Harlaston
- District: Lichfield
- Shire county: Staffordshire
- Region: West Midlands
- Country: England
- Sovereign state: United Kingdom
- Post town: TAMWORTH
- Postcode district: B79
- Dialling code: 01827
- Police: Staffordshire
- Fire: Staffordshire
- Ambulance: West Midlands
- UK Parliament: Tamworth
- Website: www.harlaston.org

Harlaston is a village and civil parish in Staffordshire, England. It lies on the River Mease, about 5 miles (8 km) north of Tamworth. There is an Early English church, dedicated to St Matthew, and a public house, the White Lion.

Harlaston is a conservation area, and has won the Staffordshire Best Kept Small Village award 5 times.

== History ==
The name Harlaston comes from Old English, and means either Heoruwulf's farm or Heorulaf's farm. It has been suggested that the church goes back to the 11th century and is of Anglo-Saxon origin. Certainly, a corn mill is mentioned in the Domesday Book.

Until 1845 Harlaston was a chapelry of the parish of Clifton Campville, after which date it became an independent ecclesiastical parish.

In 1851 the population was 221, on about 1400 acres of land. There were 2 lords of the manor, Captain Theophilus Levett and W Chettle, though much of the land belonged to other people.

== Governance ==
The township of Harlaston became part of Tamworth Poor Law Union in 1836. In 1866 it also became a civil parish in its own right, becoming part of Tamworth Rural District in 1894. During the boundary changes of 1934, the parish was extended to incorporate Haselour, becoming part of Lichfield Rural District. In 1974 it became part of the new non-metropolitan district of Lichfield.

Electorally the parish is part of Mease and Tame ward of Lichfield District, and lies within the parliamentary constituency of Tamworth.

== Landmarks ==
Harlaston includes a number of historic buildings. Listed Grade II* is the parish church of St Matthew; grade II listings include the Manor House, as well as several other houses, mileposts, and a telephone box.

The Church is mainly built of red brick in Norman and Early English styles. There is a tower with three bells and a clock. The upper part of the tower is half-timbered – this is said to be unusual for Staffordshire. A small spire was added in the 19th century. The Old Rectory alongside the church dates from 1842.

The Manor House dates back to 1540. It is of traditional timber construction.

The Homestead dates back to 1773. It was built by William Mercer, a harness maker. It may have once also been the village pub, the Whip and Saddle.

== Other Settlements ==
Haselour ^{grid reference SK205108} is an ancient manor and hamlet about a mile west of Harlaston. The name Haselour comes from Old English and means hazel ridge. In 1851 it was described as having a population of 29 people in 5 houses, and covered 570 acres (230 ha). The area was extra-parochial and the people were served by the chapel at Harlaston.

For local government purposes Haselour was extra-parochial until 1858, when it became a civil parish within Lichfield Poor Law Union. In 1894 it became part of Lichfield Rural District; in 1934 the civil parish was incorporated into Harlaston.

Listed Grade II* are Haselour Hall and its associated chapel. The manor house of Haselour Hall, with its traditional half-timbered Tudor appearance, dates back to the 16th century. The chapel dates from the 14th century, and was restored in the 1880s, but is now in poor condition and is on the English Heritage at risk register. As of 2020, the Hall and chapel are on sale for £2.9 million.

The now-closed Elford railway station was originally named Haselour.

== See also ==
- Listed buildings in Harlaston
