= Canville-la-Rocque =

- Commune
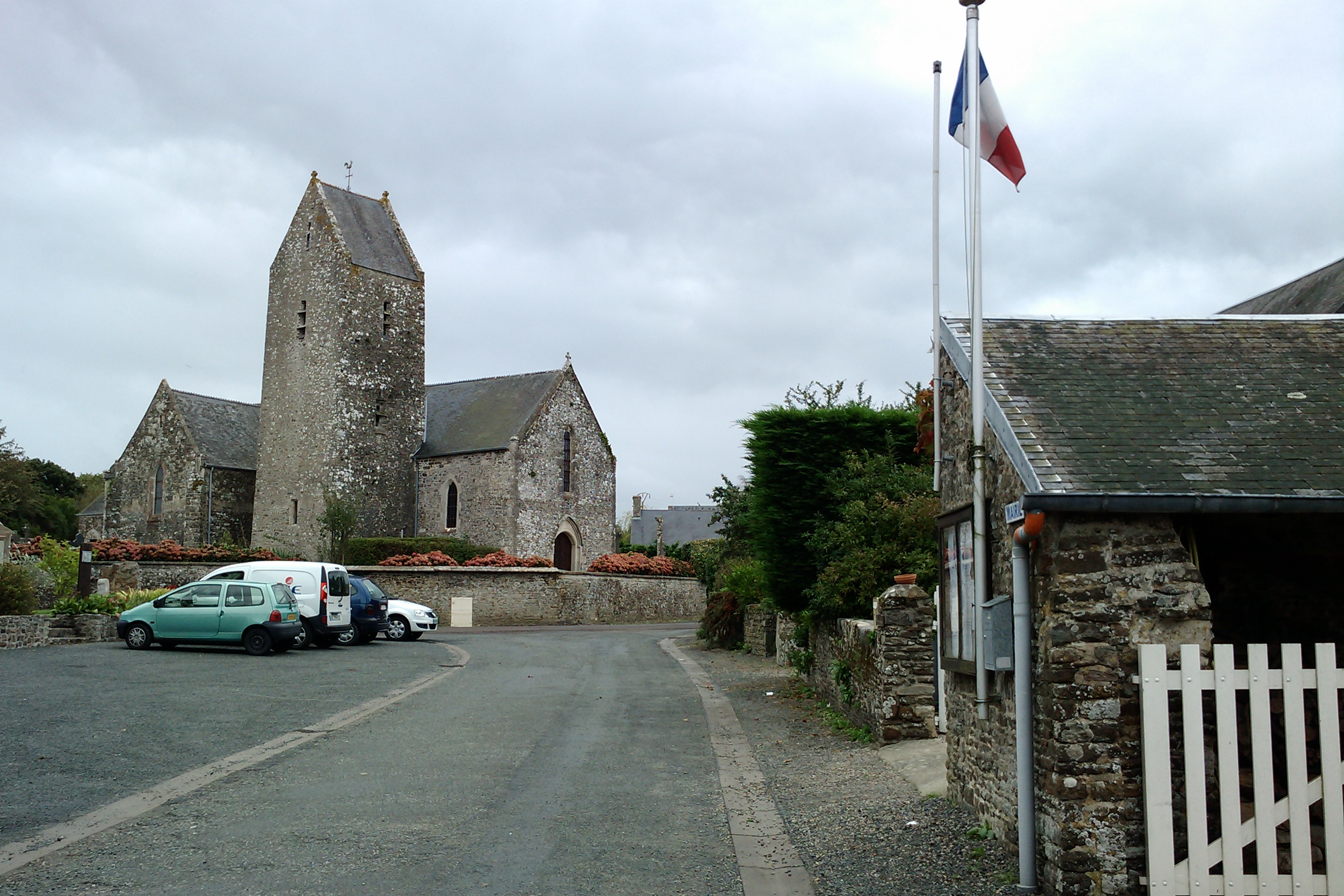
- Village square
- Location of Canville-la-Rocque
- Location within France Location within Normandy
- Coordinates: 49°20′33″N 1°38′09″W
- Country: France
- Region: Normandy
- Department: Manche
- Arrondissement: Cherbourg
- Canton: Créances
- Intercommunality: CA Cotentin

Government
  - Mayor (2020–2026): Patrick Broquet
- Area^{1}: 5.35 km^{2} (2.07 sq mi)
- Elevation: 43 m (141 ft)
- Highest elevation: 43 m (141 ft)
- Lowest elevation: 7 m (23 ft)
- Population (2023): 125
  - Density: 23.4/km^{2} (60.5/sq mi)
- Time zone: UTC+01:00 (CET)
  - Summer (DST): UTC+02:00 (CEST)
- INSEE/Postal code: 50097 /50580
- ^{1} French Land Register data, which excludes lakes, ponds, glaciers > 1 km^{2} (0.386 sq mi or 247 acres) and river estuaries.

Canville-la-Rocque (French pronunciation: [kɑ̃vil la ʁɔk]) is a commune in the Manche department in Normandy in north-western France.

== See also ==
- Communes of the Manche department
