= Edmund Stafford, 1st Baron Stafford =

English Baron

Edmund de Stafford
- Baron Stafford
- Arms of Edmund Stafford, 1st Baron Stafford: Or, a chevron Gules,
- Born: 15 July 1272/73; Clifton, Staffs
- Died: 12 August 1308
- Buried: Friors Minors, Stafford
- Noble family: Stafford
- Spouse: Margaret Basset
- Issue: Ralph Stafford, 1st Earl of Stafford; Richard Stafford, 1st Baron Stafford of Clifton; Margaret Stafford; William Stafford; Humphrey Stafford; Jacobus Stafford; Catherine Stafford; Elizabeth Stafford
- Father: Nicholas de Stafford
- Mother: Eleanor de Clinton

Edmund de Stafford, 1st Baron Stafford (1272/1273 – 1308), was the son of Nicholas de Stafford, who was summoned to parliament by writ on 6 February 1299 by King Edward I. He was a signatory of the Baron's Letter to Pope Boniface VIII in 1301.

== The origins of the Stafford family ==
The Staffords were first found in the Domesday survey, with Robert de Stafford in possession of around 131 lordships, including being the governor of Stafford Castle from which the name is assumed to have been taken. Over the next 200 years, the following Staffords inherited the estate:

- Nicholas de Stafford, who was sheriff of Staffordshire. Married Maud.
- Robert de Stafford (died abt 1176); son of Nicholas. He was sheriff of Staffordshire and also performed a pilgrimage to Jerusalem. Married Anastasia
- Robert de Stafford. Son of Robert, died without issue and was succeeded by his sister Milisent.
- Milisent de Stafford. married Hervey Bagot, who paid three marks to the crown for his wife's inheritance. Their son and heir assumed the maternal surname.
- Hervey de Stafford (died 1237). Fought with King Henry III at the siege of Bitham Castle, Lincs. Married Patronill (Petronella), sister of William de Ferrers, Earl of Derby.
- Hervey de Stafford. Died without issue in 1241 and was succeeded by his brother
- Robert de Stafford (died 1282). Had to pay Henry III £100 for the livery of his lands; fought in the wars in Gascony and in Wales. Married Alice Corbet, daughter and heir of Thomas Corbet, of Caus.
- Nicholas de Stafford. Active in wars against the Welsh; killed at Dryslwyn Castle in 1287. He had first married Anne de Langley and then Eleanor De Clinton, with whom he had issue.

== Edmund, first baron ==
Edmund was born in Clifton, Staffordshire, in 1272. He inherited the estates on the death of his father in 1287 and distinguished himself in the Scottish wars with King Edward I. He was summoned to Parliament by writ on 6 February 1299 and had regular summonses for the rest of his life.

Edmund married before 1298 (date of settlement) Margaret Basset, daughter of Ralph Basset, Lord Basset of Drayton and Hawise.

Their children were:

- Ralph de Stafford (1301–1372)
- Richard Stafford (d. 1380). He married Isabel de Vernon, daughter and heir of Sir Richard de Vernon and Maud de Camville. Richard fought in the French wars of Edward III and was also appointed seneschal of Gascony. He was summoned to Parliament by King Edward III and regularly participated through to 1379. He was appointed 1st Baron Stafford of Clifton, created by writ of summons on 8 January 1371.

They are listed as having additional children, although evidence is lacking.

- Margaret Stafford
- William Stafford
- Humphrey Stafford
- Jacobus Stafford
- Catherine Stafford
- Elizabeth Stafford
- Thomas Stafford

Edmund died on 12 August 1308 in Stafford and was buried at the Church of the Friars Minors, Stafford.

Peerage of England
New creation	Baron Stafford; 1st creation 1299–1308	Succeeded by Ralph Stafford
