= Canville-les-Deux-Églises =

- Commune
- Location of Canville-les-Deux-Églises
- Location within France Location within Normandy
- Coordinates: 49°46′14″N 0°50′28″E
- Country: France
- Region: Normandy
- Department: Seine-Maritime
- Arrondissement: Rouen
- Canton: Yvetot
- Intercommunality: CC Plateau de Caux

Government
  - Mayor (2020–2026): Josiane Cerveau
- Area^{1}: 5.77 km^{2} (2.23 sq mi)
- Elevation: 125 m (410 ft)
- Highest elevation: 133 m (436 ft)
- Lowest elevation: 82 m (269 ft)
- Population (2023): 305
  - Density: 52.9/km^{2} (137/sq mi)
- Time zone: UTC+01:00 (CET)
  - Summer (DST): UTC+02:00 (CEST)
- INSEE/Postal code: 76158 /76560
- ^{1} French Land Register data, which excludes lakes, ponds, glaciers > 1 km^{2} (0.386 sq mi or 247 acres) and river estuaries.

Canville-les-Deux-Églises (French pronunciation: [kɑ̃vil le dø.z‿eɡliz], literally Canville the Two Churches) is a commune in the Seine-Maritime department in the Normandy region in northern France.

== Geography ==
A farming village situated in the Pays de Caux, some 16 miles (26 km) southwest of Dieppe, at the junction of the D89, D107 and the D307 roads.

== Population ==
Historical population
Year	Pop.	±% p.a.
1968	248	—
1975	216	−1.95%
1982	195	−1.45%
1990	239	+2.58%
1999	299	+2.52%
2007	308	+0.37%
2012	336	+1.76%
2017	328	−0.48%
2023	305	−1.20%
Source: INSEE

== Places of interest ==
- Saint-Martin's church, dating from the eighteenth century.

== See also ==
- Communes of the Seine-Maritime department
