= Hawkesyard Priory =

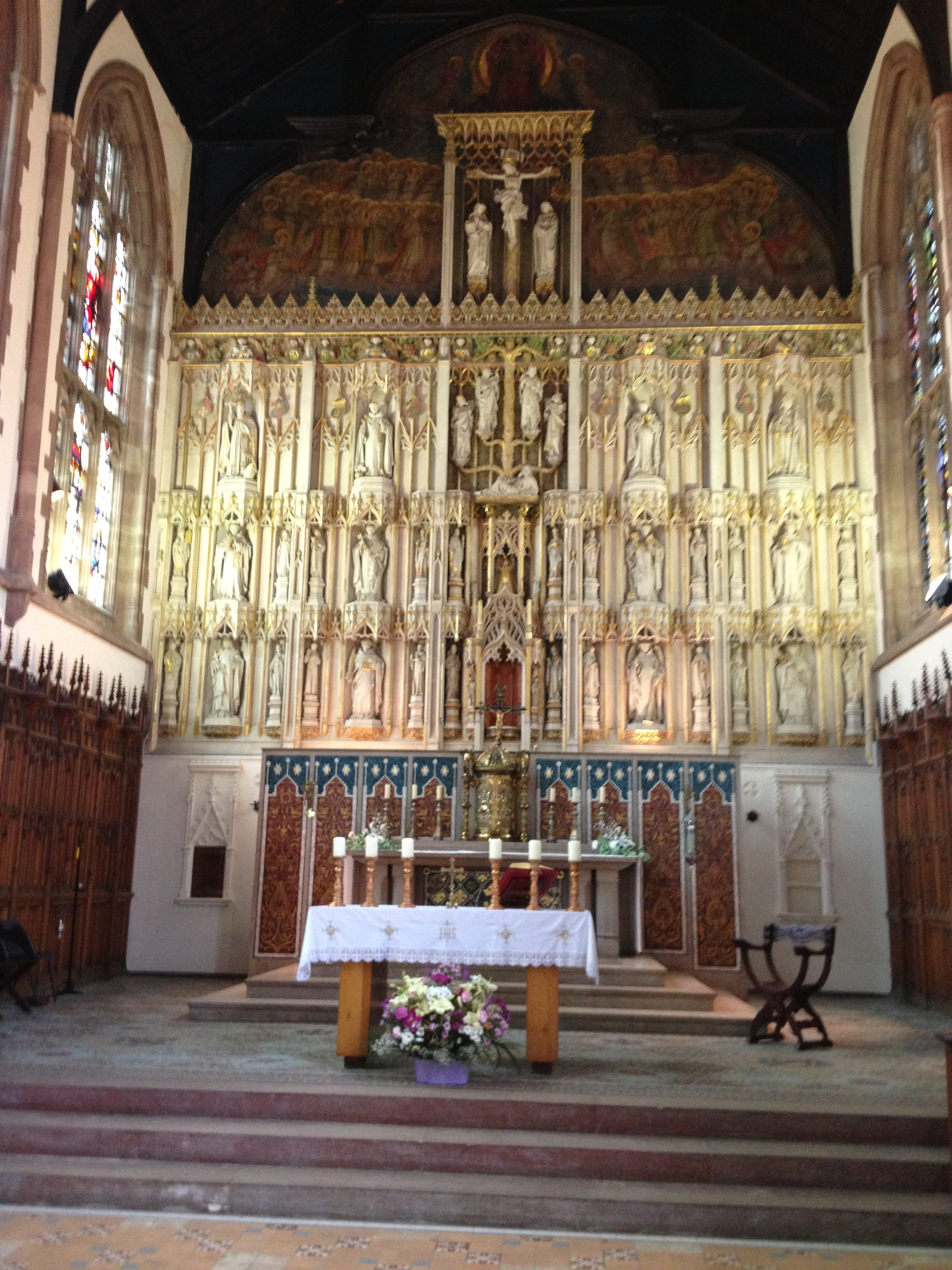
- View towards the high altar
- Hawkesyard Priory
- 52°44′37.8″N 1°54′11.4″W
- OS grid reference: SK 06638 16257
- Location: Brereton, Staffordshire
- Country: England
- Denomination: Old Catholic Church
- Previous denomination: Roman Catholic

Architecture
- Heritage designation: Grade II listed
- Architect: Edward Goldie
- Groundbreaking: 1896
- Completed: 1914

Hawkesyard Priory was a Dominican priory off Armitage Lane Brereton, Rugeley, Staffordshire, England, built between 1896 and 1914 which included the Roman Catholic Priory Church of St Thomas.

== History ==
=== Spode House ===
Originally named "Hawksyard", in 1760 the estate was renamed Armitage Park. 1n 1839, it was purchased by Mary Spode, widow of Josiah Spode III, grandson of Josiah Spode of the Spode Pottery works; it became known as "Spode House". Her son, Josiah Spode IV served as High Sheriff of Staffordshire in 1850. He was also the warden and organist at St. John the Baptist Church in the nearby village of Armitage. In 1861 Lichfield Cathedral replaced its 1789 organ and in 1865 Spode had it moved to St. John's. In 1885, Spode, and his niece, Helen Gulson converted to Catholicism at Stone, Staffordshire, where the English congregation of the Dominican Sisters of St. Catherine of Sienna had their motherhouse.

Josiah lived at Spode House with his niece until his death in 1893. It was Spode's intention that Gulson should reside in the house and upon her death it should be donated to the Dominican order. However, Gulson decided to relocate to a cottage, elsewhere on the estate, and turned the hall over to the Dominicans. In 1898 the Order built a new priory within the grounds. Josiah's mother and his wife, Helen, are buried at St. John's; he and his niece are interred in a small chapel of the Priory Church.

=== Priory ===
New conventual buildings were funded by Gulson and when the friars moved into the new priory, the Hall became a school.

The church was built between 1896 and 1914 for the Dominican Order by the architect Edward Goldie. It consists of a hammer beam roof with eight bays of large perpendicular windows, with a facade of the Royal Chapel type, and a fan vaulted chapel on the south side.

The Dominican friars left the site in 1988 and the estate was sold to a private buyer in 1989. The priory church is now the spiritual home of the Society of Traditional Old Catholics. The buildings which would have been the living quarters for the friars has now been converted into a nursing home.

== Organ ==
The organ dates from 1700 by Father Smith and came from Eton College. A specification of the organ can be found on the National Pipe Organ Register.

== See also ==
- Listed buildings in Armitage with Handsacre
