= Hamstall Ridware =

Village in Staffordshire, England

Coordinates: 52.768275°N 1.841668°W

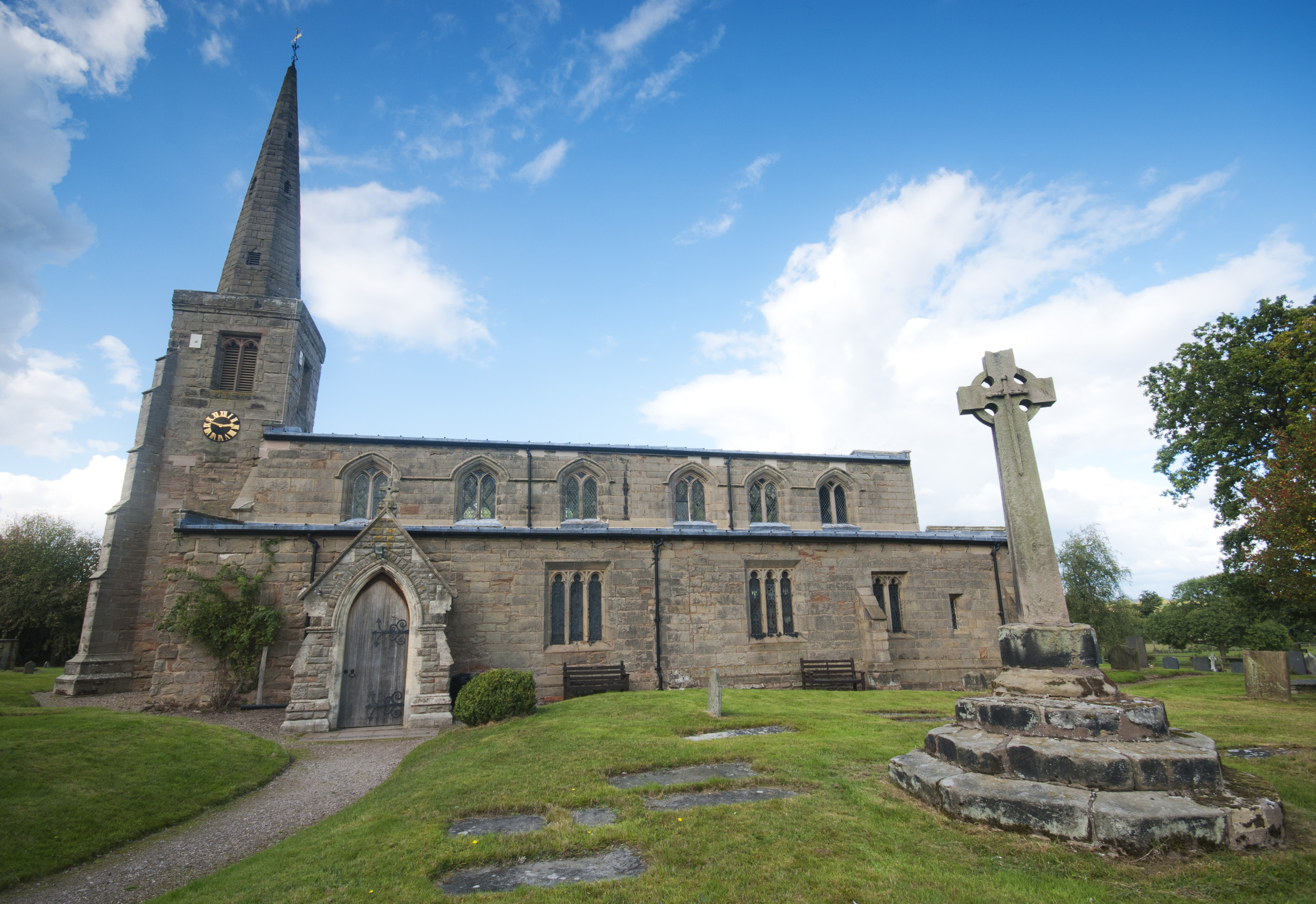
- Church of St Michael and All Angels

- Location within Staffordshire
- Population: 313 (2011)
- OS grid reference: SK107189
- District: Lichfield
- Shire county: Staffordshire
- Region: West Midlands
- Country: England
- Sovereign state: United Kingdom
- Post town: RUGELEY
- Postcode district: WS15
- Dialling code: 01889
- Police: Staffordshire
- Fire: Staffordshire
- Ambulance: West Midlands
- UK Parliament: Lichfield

Hamstall Ridware is a village and civil parish in the Lichfield district of Staffordshire, England. It is in the Trent Valley, and lies close to the villages of Hill Ridware, Mavesyn Ridware and Pipe Ridware. It is eight miles north of the city of Lichfield, and four miles east of Rugeley. The hamlet of Olive Green lies to the east of the village at grid reference SK116187.

Within the village lie the grade II* listed ruins of Hamstall Hall.

== See also ==
- Listed buildings in Hamstall Ridware
