= Armitage with Handsacre =

- Civil parish
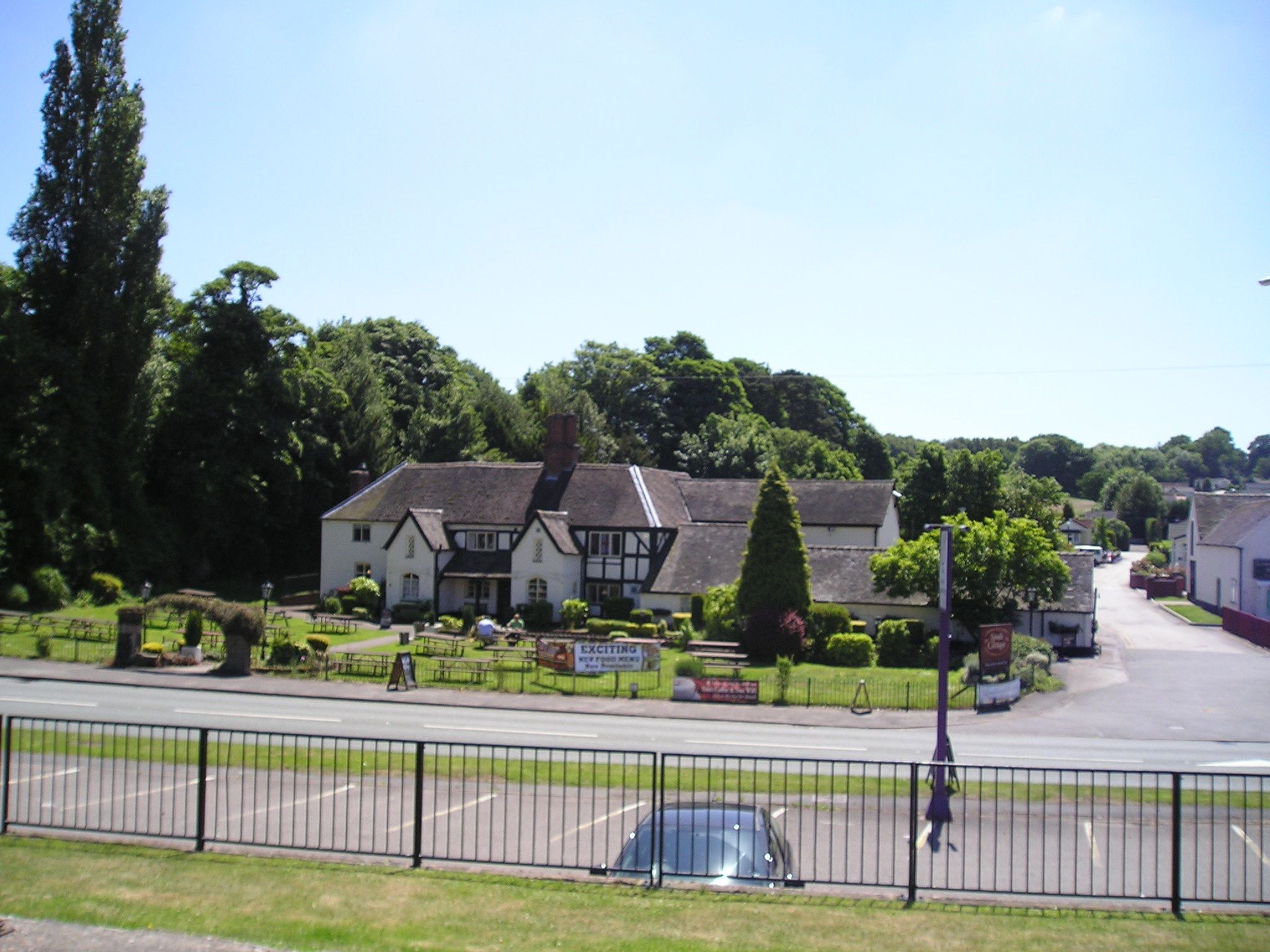
- The Spode Cottage Pub, Armitage
- Interactive map of Armitage with Handsacre
- Coordinates: 52°44′28″N 1°52′16″W
- Country: England
- Primary council: Lichfield
- County: Staffordshire
- Region: West Midlands
- Status: Parish
- Main settlements: Armitage, Handsacre

Government
  - Type: Parish Council
  - UK Parliament: Lichfield

Population (2011)
  - Total: 5,335
- Postal code: Rugeley
- Area code: WS

Armitage with Handsacre or just Armitage is a civil parish in the Lichfield district of Staffordshire, England. It includes the villages of Armitage and Handsacre, and in 2001 had a population of 5,181, rising to 5,335 at the 2011 Census.

The parish's northern border is the River Trent and the town of Rugeley, south of Mavesyn Ridware. To the east it borders Kings Bromley, to the south Longdon and Lichfield to the west Brereton and Ravenhill areas of Rugeley.

There are 19 listed buildings in Armitage with Handsacre
