= Armitage =

Village in Staffordshire, England

Coordinates: 52.74156°N 1.87702°W

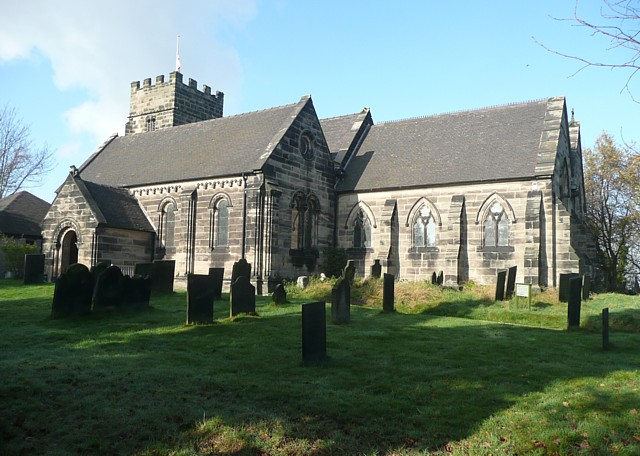
- St John the Baptist's

- Location within Staffordshire
- OS grid reference: SK084160
- Civil parish: Armitage with Handsacre
- District: Lichfield
- Shire county: Staffordshire
- Region: West Midlands
- Country: England
- Sovereign state: United Kingdom
- Post town: RUGELEY
- Postcode district: WS15
- Dialling code: 01543
- Police: Staffordshire
- Fire: Staffordshire
- Ambulance: West Midlands
- UK Parliament: Lichfield

Armitage is a village in the Lichfield district, in Staffordshire, England, on the Trent and Mersey Canal south of Rugeley and north of Lichfield. With the village of Handsacre it forms the civil parish of Armitage with Handsacre, which had a population of 5,335 at the 2011 Census.

Armitage is the home of Armitage Shanks sanitary porcelain factory. Its parish church, St. John the Baptist church, is at the north end of the village. The organ of St John the Baptist church is of particular interest due to its size, age and history. The organ was built in 1789 for nearby Lichfield Cathedral, but moved here in 1865, commissioned by the then organist Josiah Spode (IV) who resided at nearby Hawkesyard estate, also known as Spode House. Armitage is served by Chaserider bus services 826 and 828 connecting to Lichfield, Rugeley and Stafford.

== Etymology and location ==
The name comes from the Middle English Ermitage, meaning 'Hermitage', in turn derived from the Old French ermitage, from a tradition that a hermit lived between the church and the River Trent. It does not appear in the Domesday Book, although Handsacre does.

Armitage is now part of Armitage with Handsacre, although this is due to growth—historically they were once separate villages. It lies close to Hill Ridware along with the Hamstall Ridware, Mavesyn Ridware, Pipe Ridware and Longdon. It lies close to the town of Rugeley and a few miles north of Lichfield. It is located on the West Coast Main Line, the nearest stop being Rugeley. With continuous growth in the area Armitage and Rugeley are growing closer together.

== See also ==
- Listed buildings in Armitage with Handsacre
