= Blithbury =

Village in Staffordshire, England

Coordinates: 52.777778°N 1.877778°W

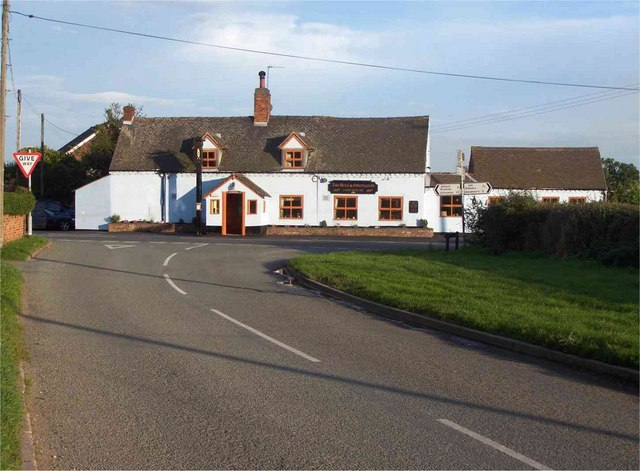
- The Bull and Spectacles

- Location within Staffordshire
- OS grid reference: SK083201
- Civil parish: Mavesyn Ridware
- District: Lichfield
- Shire county: Staffordshire
- Region: West Midlands
- Country: England
- Sovereign state: United Kingdom
- Post town: RUGELEY
- Postcode district: WS15
- Dialling code: 01889
- Police: Staffordshire
- Fire: Staffordshire
- Ambulance: West Midlands
- UK Parliament: Lichfield

Blithbury is a small village in Lichfield District, Staffordshire, England. Part of the civil parish of Mavesyn Ridware, it lies near the River Blithe, about 3 miles (5 km) north of Handsacre, 3 miles north-east of Rugeley, and 3 miles south of Abbots Bromley.

There used to be a public house on the corner of Blithbury Road and Uttoxeter Road which was called The Bull and Spectacles, but it has now closed. In the 19th century, the pub had the more common name of Bull's Head.

In the first half of the 12th century, religious houses for monks and nuns were founded at Blithbury. Within a few decades, only the nuns are mentioned. The order was associated with the nuns of Black Ladies Priory, Brewood. It was eventually absorbed by them, so there is no mention of the nuns of Blithbury after the early 14th century.

According to Douglas Adams' 1983 humorous dictionary "The Meaning of Liff", a Blithbury is "A look someone gives you by which you become aware that they're much too drunk to have understood anything you've said to them in the last twenty minutes".
