= Brereton and Ravenhill =

Civil parish in Staffordshire, England

Coordinates: 52.7451°N 1.9211°W

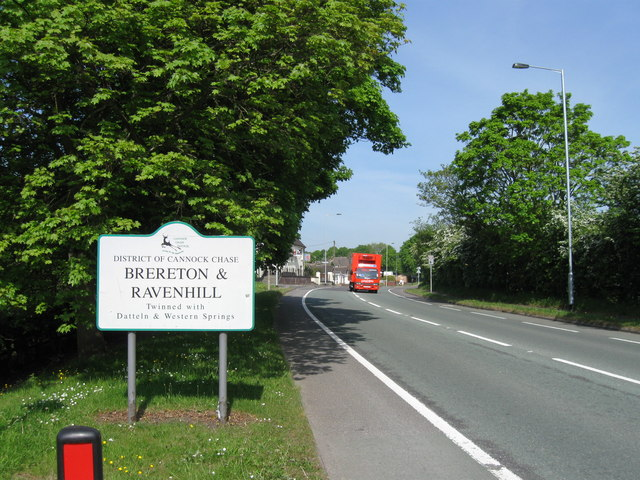
- Brereton and Ravenhill Sign

- Location within Staffordshire
- Area: 5.285 km^{2} (2.041 sq mi)
- Population: 7,026 (2021 Census)
  - Density: 1,329/km^{2} (3,440/sq mi)
- Civil parish: Brereton and Ravenhill
- District: Cannock Chase
- Shire county: Staffordshire
- Region: West Midlands
- Country: England
- Sovereign state: United Kingdom
- Post town: RUGELEY
- Postcode district: WS15
- Police: Staffordshire
- Fire: Staffordshire
- Ambulance: West Midlands
- UK Parliament: Cannock Chase

Brereton and Ravenhill, formerly just Brereton is a civil parish in the Cannock Chase district of Staffordshire, England. It is located within parts of the Cannock Chase and covers both the villages of Brereton and Ravenhill. In 2021 the parish had a population of 7026. The parish borders the Cannock Chase parishes of Brindley Heath, Mavesyn Ridware and Rugeley and the Lichfield parishes of Armitage with Handsacre, Colton and Longdon. The council is based at Brereton and Ravenhill Parish Hall.

== History ==
The parish was formed on 1 April 1988 as "Brereton" from part of Rugeley unparished area, on 8 September 1988 the parish was renamed to "Brereton and Ravenhill".

== See also ==
- Listed buildings in Brereton and Ravenhill
