= Church of St Nicholas, Mavesyn Ridware =

Church of St Nicholas
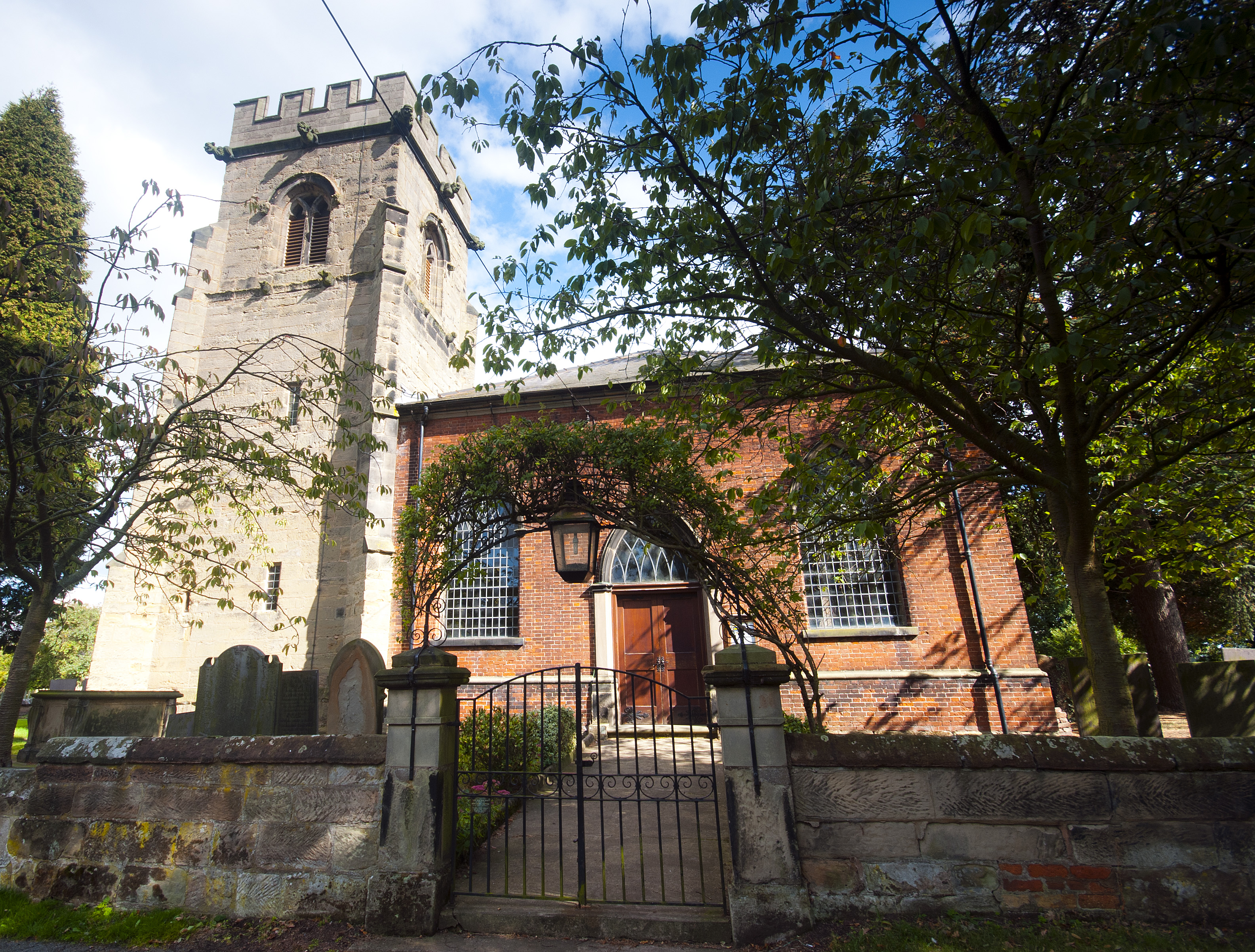
- Church of St Nicholas
- 52.749361°N 1.880502°W
- OS grid reference: SK 08162 16871
- Location: Mavesyn Ridware, Staffordshire
- Country: England
- Denomination: Anglican

History
- Founded: 1140
- Founder: Hugo de Mavesyn

Architecture
- Functional status: Active
- Heritage designation: Grade I
- Architectural type: Church
- Style: Gothic

Administration
- Province: Canterbury
- Diocese: Lichfield
- Parish: Lichfield

Clergy
- Vicar: Revd Tyrone John Leyland

The Church of St Nicholas is a Grade I listed parish church in the village of Mavesyn Ridware, Staffordshire, England. The church is situated at the eastern end of the village approximately 370 m (1,210 ft) north of the River Trent and just to the north of the Gatehouse of the former ancient Manor House. Although medieval in origin the church was partly demolished in 1782 leaving only the north aisle and west tower remaining from the older structure. The church is one of only 12 Grade I listed buildings in Lichfield District. It is listed as such as it is a complete example of a late 18th-century church rebuilding including a very rare late 18th-century and early 19th-century conversion of a medieval aisle to the former church into a family chapel with neo-medieval fittings and monuments.

== History ==
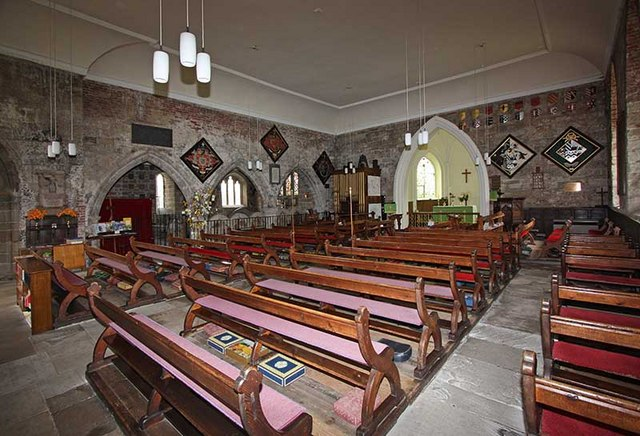
Nave of the church

It is believed the church of St Nicholas was founded in 1140 by Hugo de Mavesyn and his tomb in the church occupies the position generally assigned to its founder. The church was built in 1140 and extended during the medieval period until it was partly demolished and rebuilt in 1782.

Before 1782 the church consisted of a tower, north aisle, south aisle, nave, chancel and porch. The chancel was divided from the nave by an open wooden screen and the walls were brightly coloured as was the ceiling of the south aisle. The north aisle was built in the 13th century of ashlar sandstone and has a number of original lancet windows, it was separated from the nave by three arches with octagonal pillars. The tower at the west end of the church was built of sandstone in the 15th century in a perpendicular gothic style with gargoyles projecting from the corners. Four bells were installed in the tower during the 17th century.

In 1782 the medieval nave, chancel, porch and south aisle were demolished. The remaining west tower and north aisle were added to with a red brick wide square nave and polygonal chancel that ends in an apse. Some of the stone from the demolished building was used in the new part of the church as a wall between the nave and chancel. The new part of the church was built higher than the older part with steps leading down to the medieval north aisle. The small vestry window in the north aisle was created from a doorway in the original church. The four bells were recast in 1923 and two bells were added in 1928. A further two bells were added in 1999 to make a ring of eight bells with tenor weight of eight and three quarter hundredweight.

== Monuments and effigies ==
Many monuments, tombs and effigies are displayed in the medieval north aisle also named the Mavesyn Chapel. Since the 12th century Lords of the Manor of Mavesyn were buried in the church. The main family vault lies below the floor of the north aisle. One tomb bears the effigy of Sir Robert Mavesyn who was killed at the Battle of Shrewsbury in 1403. Another tomb has an incised slab to Thomas Cawarden who died in 1593. There are also effigies of two 13th-century knights, and a series of incised slabs on the floor of the aisle to David Cardon who died in 1557, John Cardon who died in 1485, John Cardon who died in 1477 and Hugo Davenport who died in 1473. The font in the church is from the Norman period with bands of wavy stems and leaves.

There is a large Grade II listed monument in the churchyard east of the chancel. It is a sandstone rectangular chest tomb dating from the mid 18th century. The inscription is now illegible. The churchyard also contains a war grave of a World War I soldier of the Royal Engineers.

== See also ==
- Grade I listed churches in Staffordshire
- Listed buildings in Mavesyn Ridware
