= Listed buildings in Armitage with Handsacre =

Armitage with Handsacre is a civil parish in the district of Lichfield, Staffordshire, England. It contains 19 buildings that are recorded in the National Heritage List for England. Of these, one is listed at Grade II*, the middle of the three grades, and the others are at Grade II, the lowest grade. The parish contains the villages of Armitage and Handsacre and the surrounding countryside. Most of the listed buildings are houses and farmhouses, the earlier of which are timber framed. The Trent and Mersey Canal passes through the parish, and two accommodation bridges crossing it are listed. Hawkesyard Priory is in the parish, and its priory church is listed, together with nearby Spode House and associated structures, which have connections with the priory. The other listed buildings are another church, a chapel, a churchyard cross, and a war memorial.

== Key ==
Grade	Criteria
II*	Particularly important buildings of more than special interest
II	Buildings of national importance and special interest

== Buildings ==
Name and location	Photograph	Date	Notes	Grade
Former Farmhouse, Hood Lane; 52.73586°N 1.88058°W	—	15th century (probable)	The former farmhouse is timber framed with cruck construction, brick infill, some rebuilding in brick, and a thatched roof. There is one storey and an attic, three bays, and varied windows including two dormers with the roof arched over them. Inside there is a timber-framed partition and two cruck trusses.	II
St John's Church, Armitage; 52.74599°N 1.88704°W		1632	The oldest part of the church is the tower, the rest of the church dating from 1844 to 1847. It is built in stone and has a tile roof with crested ridge tiles. The church consists of a nave, north and south aisles, a south porch, a chancel with a north vestry and organ chamber, and a west tower. The tower has three stages, diagonal buttresses, and an embattled parapet. The chancel is in Gothic style, and the tower and the rest of the church is in Norman style with round-headed windows and doorways. There is a circular window in the west gable of the south aisle.	II*
Birchen Fields Farmhouse; 52.73813°N 1.88956°W	—	17th century	The farmhouse is in roughcast timber framing on a high sandstone plinth and has a tile roof. There are two storeys and two bays. In the centre is a sandstone porch with a chamfered mullioned window in the right return, and the rest of the windows are casements. The doorway has a pointed segmental-arched head.	II
Church Farmhouse; 52.74568°N 1.88742°W	—	17th century	The farmhouse, later a private house, was extended in the 18th and 20th centuries. The original part is timber framed, the extensions are in stone and brick, and the roof is tiled. There is a T-shaped plan, with a two-storey main range on a sandstone plinth, a gabled cross-wing with two storeys and an attic refronted in brick, and a rear wing. On the cross-wing is a gabled porch, and the windows vary.	II
Clarke's Hays, Lichfield Road; 52.73750°N 1.86570°W	—	17th century	A farmhouse, later a private house, it is timber framed with brick infill, some rebuilding in brick, and a tile roof. There are two storeys and an attic and an L-shaped plan, consisting of a three-bay front range and a rear wing. On the front are canted bay windows, and the other windows are casements. Inside, there is an inglenook fireplace.	II
Lodge Cottage, Rugeley Road; 52.74422°N 1.88853°W	—	17th century	A timber framed house with brick infill and a thatched roof, it has one storey and an attic, three bays, and a single-storey lean-to on the left. The windows are casements, and there are two dormers with the roof arched over them.	II
The Old Farmhouse Restaurant; 52.74459°N 1.89295°W	—	17th century	The farmhouse, later a restaurant, was extended in the 19th century. The original part is timber framed with painted brick infill, the extensions are in brick painted to resemble timber framing, and it has a hipped tile roof. There are two storeys, the original range has two bays, and there are various extensions. The building has two gabled porches and a lean-to porch, and the windows are casements.	II
The Old House, Hall Road; 52.74179°N 1.86801°W	—	17th century	A timber framed house with red brick infill on a sandstone plinth with a tile roof. There are two storeys and an attic, and a T-shaped plan, consisting of a two-bay front range and a rear wing. The windows are casements, and the door is at the rear.	II
Marsh Barn Farmhouse; 52.74474°N 1.86231°W	—	Late 17th century	The farmhouse was extended in the 19th century. It is in brick with a tile roof and two storeys. There is an L-shaped plan, consisting of a four-bay main range, a projecting gabled cross-wing to the right, and a later two-bay rear wing. The windows are casements, and in the rear wing is a canted bay window with a hipped slate roof, and a lean-to porch.	II
Stonehouse Cottages, New Road; 52.74216°N 1.88146°W		Late 17th century	A pair of houses that were altered in the 18th and 19th centuries. The original part is in sandstone, the extensions are in red brick, and the roof is tiled. There is a T-shaped plan, with a two-storey single-bay main range, and a gabled cross-wing to the left with two storeys and an attic. In the main range is a doorway with a segmental head, a casement window with a segmental head in the ground floor, and a gabled casement window above. In the cross-wing are mullioned windows, and in the attic is a segmental-headed casement window.	II
Spode House and coach house 52.74443°N 1.90283°W	—	1760	The house was extended in 1840; the original part is in red brick, stuccoed on the south, the extension is in stone, the hipped roofs are slated, and the house is in Gothic style. There are two storeys, the south front has seven bays, the middle three bays projecting and canted. It has a moulded string course and an embattled parapet. In the centre is a doorway with a four-centred arch, and the windows are sashes. The block is flanked by octagonal turrets with domed caps and coronets. Attached to the right is a single-storey coach house.	II
Bridge No. 59; 52.74362°N 1.87354°W		Late 18th century	An accommodation bridge over the Trent and Mersey Canal, it is in red brick with stone coping. The bridge consists of a single segmental-headed arch, and has a humped back, and swept wings ending in piers at all four corners.	II
Bridge No. 60; 52.74559°N 1.88418°W		Late 18th century	An accommodation bridge over the Trent and Mersey Canal, it is in red brick with stone coping, and is built into the stone walls of a cutting. The bridge consists of a single segmental-headed arch, and has swept wings ending in piers at all four corners.	II
United Reformed Church Chapel, Rugeley Road; 52.74311°N 1.88627°W		1820	Built as a Congregational chapel, it was extended in the 19th century. The chapel is built in red brick with rendered dressings, and has a tile roof with moulded stone coped gable ends. It is in Tudor Gothic style, and has a west gallery, a vestry at the east end, and a projection to the north. At the west end is a two-storey porch with stepped buttresses, containing a doorway with a four-centred arched head and a moulded hood mould, above which is a rose window with a moulded surround. Along the sides are buttresses, and windows with pointed heads.	II
1 Old Road; 52.74239°N 1.88038°W		Early 19th century	A cottage in sandstone with a hipped tile roof, in Tudor style. There are two storeys, an octagonal plan, and a kitchen wing. The doorway and windows have moulded surrounds, and the windows have moulded mullions and transoms, and moulded hood moulds.	II
Former Summerhouse, Spode House; 52.74461°N 1.90305°W	—	c. 1840	The former summer house is in red brick, with a cast iron frame to the south, and a corrugated asbestos roof. It has one storey and octagonal corner turrets. On the front are twelve bays of cast iron panels and Tudor arches with windows above, and flanking the middle four bays are cast iron columns with embattled caps.	II
Churchyard Cross; 52.74584°N 1.88692°W	—	c. 1844–47	The cross is in the churchyard of St John's Church, it is in stone and incorporates 12th-century material from a previous church on the site. There is a hexagonal base of three steps, and the shaft is surmounted by a Celtic cross, The shaft and cross are decorated with Romanesque motifs.	II
St Thomas' Church, Hawkesyard Priory; 52.74395°N 1.90305°W	—	c. 1900	The priory church was designed by Edward Goldie, and is in red brick with stone dressings and a plain parapet. It consists of a nave and a chancel in one unit, with chapels, a porch, and corner buttresses with crocketed pinnacles. Along the sides are large windows in Perpendicular style, and at the apex of the east gable is a canopied niche containing a statue. Inside, there is a hammerbeam roof, and the organ case was moved here from Eton College.	II
War Memorial, New Road; 52.74169°N 1.87726°W	—	1920	The war memorial stands in a small garden at a road junction. It is in sandstone and consists of a tall Calvary on an octagonal shaft on a tapering square plinth. The plinth is on a round step on a platform in the shape of an octofoil. On the faces of the plinth are inscriptions referring to the First World War and containing the names of those lost in that conflict. In front of the plinth is a stone segment with the names of those lost in the Second World War.	II
