= Listed buildings in Hamstall Ridware =

Hamstall Ridware is a civil parish in the district of Lichfield, Staffordshire, England. It contains 19 listed buildings that are recorded in the National Heritage List for England. Of these, one is at Grade I, the highest of the three grades, three are at Grade II*, the middle grade, and the others are at Grade II, the lowest grade. The parish contains the village of Hamstall Ridware and the surrounding countryside. In the village was a mansion that has been largely demolished and replaced by a newer house. The remaining buildings associated with the original house, namely a gatehouse, a tower and associated walls, are listed together with the later house and other structures associated with it. Also in the village is a church, with crosses and memorials in the churchyard, that are listed. The other listed buildings are houses, cottages, and farmhouses, the earlier of which are timber framed or have timber framed cores.

== Key ==
Grade	Criteria
I	Buildings of exceptional interest, sometimes considered to be internationally important
II*	Particularly important buildings of more than special interest
II	Buildings of national importance and special interest

== Buildings ==
Name and location	Photograph	Date	Notes	Grade
St Michael's Church; 52.77174°N 1.84482°W		12th century	Most of the church dates from the 14th and 15th centuries, the north chapel walls date from the 18th century, and the south porch from the 19th century. The church is built in sandstone and has a lead roof. It consists of a nave with a clerestory, north and south aisles, a south porch, a chancel with a north chapel, a south chapel and vestry, and a west steeple. The steeple has a three-stage tower with diagonal buttresses, a west door with a moulded surround and a pointed head, a plain parapet, and a recessed spire with three tiers of lucarnes. The west wall of the nave contains some Norman material.	I
Churchyard cross 52.77158°N 1.84467°W	—	14th century (probable)	The cross is in the churchyard of St Michael's Church, and is in sandstone. The oldest parts are the steps and the base, the shaft and the cross dating from the 19th or 20th century. There are four octagonal steps and an octagonal base, on which stands a rectangular shaft carved with a sword.	II
Cross shaft remains 52.77156°N 1.84494°W	—	14th century (probable)	The remains of the cross shaft are in the churchyard of St Michael's Church. It is in sandstone, and consists of about 3 feet (0.91 m) of an octagonal shaft, and is heavily eroded.	II
Hamstall Hall; 52.77175°N 1.84568°W	—	15th century	A mansion that was heavily restored in the 16th century and later. The core was timber framed, it has largely been replaced by red brick, and the roof is tiled. Some of the mansion has been demolished and what remains of the main part is an L-shaped range, and a short wing linking to a porch. The range has two storeys and an attic, and eight bays, and it contains casement windows and a blocked Tudor arched doorway. The wing is gabled, and contains stone quoins. The porch is elaborate, it contains stone dressings and a central portico with Tuscan columns, on which is a balcony with a strapwork balustrade. The doorway and windows have round-headed arches with keystones, and in the gable end is a decorative strapwork oculus.	II*
Tower and walls, Hamstall Hall; 52.77194°N 1.84518°W		Late 15th century	The tower, which was altered in the 16th century, is in red brick with stone dressings, and has a lead roof. It has roughly a square plan, with three storeys, and is about 40 feet (12 m) high. Some of the windows are mullioned, and some have four-centred arched heads, and there is a Tudor arched doorway. The attached walls originally partly enclosed a courtyard. The tower and walls are part of a scheduled monument.	II*
Sandborough Farmhouse; 52.76978°N 1.83463°W	—	16th century (probable)	The farmhouse has been altered and extended. It is mainly in red brick, and has a timber framed cross-wing with brick infill and some rebuilding in red brick. The roof is tiled, and there are two storeys. The farmhouse has a T-shaped plan, consisting of a main range and a cross-wing, and there is a later extension. On the front of the main range is a gabled porch, in the angle between it and the cross-wing is a 20th-century conservatory, and the windows are casements with segmental heads.	II
Gatehouse and walls, Hamstall Hall; 52.77231°N 1.84608°W		Late 16th century	The gatehouse is in brick with stone dressings and quoins. Flanking the gateway are octagonal turrets each with an ogee-moulded cornice and a stone dome, a mullioned window with a hood mould, and a doorway with a Tudor arch. Between the turrets is a semicircular arch with a raised keystone and a strapwork parapet. Attached to the turrets are lengths of coped wall that originally partly enclosed a courtyard, and attached to the wall are the remnants of former buildings. The interior of the turrets has been converted into dovecotes containing nesting boxes. The gatehouse and walls are part of a scheduled monument.	II*
Barn and wall west of Hamstall Hall; 52.77158°N 1.84691°W		17th century	The barn is in red brick with a tile roof, one storey and a loft, five bays, and a single-storey lean-to wing on the right. The barn has full-height barn doors, and buttresses with stone coping. Attached to the left is a brick wall with a dentilled band and brick coping. Inside the barn is exposed timber framing.	II
Walls southeast of Hamstall Hall; 52.77132°N 1.84631°W	—	17th century	The walls enclose a large rectangular garden to the southeast of the hall. They are in red brick with a dentilled band and brick coping. The walls contain two Tudor arched doorways with stone surrounds.	II
Former stables and gate pier, Hamstall Hall; 52.77205°N 1.84658°W	—	17th century (probable)	The building incorporates earlier material, and was altered in the 18th century. It has a timber framed core, with the outer walls in red brick, and a tile roof. There is one storey and a loft, and five bays. The windows and door have segmental heads, there is a gabled loft door, and the rear windows are mullioned. The gate pier has a square section and a pyramidal cap. Inside are timber-framed cross-walls.	II
Hunger Hill Farmhouse; 52.76561°N 1.85358°W	—	17th century	The farmhouse is timber framed with plastered infill, a tile roof, two storeys, three bays, and a lean-to extension to the north. The windows are casements.	II
Sycamore Cottage; 52.76820°N 1.84175°W		17th century	The front wall was rebuilt in about 1900, and the house was restored in 1986. It is timber framed with brick infill, and has a tile roof. There is one story and an attic, two gabled bays, and the windows are 20th-century casements.	II
Braddocks Barn Farmhouse, Hamstall Hall Farm; 52.78042°N 1.84033°W	—	Late 17th century	A cottage that was extended in the 19th century, it is timber framed with brick infill, and has a tile roof. There is one storey and an attic, two bays, a brick gabled extension to the east, and two lean-to corrugated iron sheds at the rear. The windows on the front are horizontally-sliding sashes, at the rear is a casement window, and there are gabled dormers, two at the front and one at the rear. Inside there is an inglenook fireplace.	II
Cowley Hill Farmhouse; 52.76520°N 1.84448°W	—	Early 18th century	A red brick farmhouse with a floor band and a tile roof. There are two storeys and an attic, two bays, and a lower annex to the right. It contains casement windows and a doorway, all with segmental heads.	II
Rough Park; 52.77647°N 1.82666°W	—	Early 18th century	A farmhouse, later a private house, it was extended in the 19th century. The house is in red brick with a floor band, a dentilled eaves band, a parapet, and a tile roof. In the 19th century a wing was added to the left linking the house to an outbuilding at right angles with a 17th-century core, and a further wing was added to result in a cruciform plan. The original range has two storeys and an attic and three bays, and the 19th-century extension has three storeys and two bays. The doorway has a rectangular fanlight, and the windows are sashes with segmental heads.	II
The Old Rectory; 52.77066°N 1.84514°W	—	Early 18th century	The rectory, later a private house, is in red brick with a hipped tile roof. There are two storeys and an attic, a roughly U-shaped plan, a front of five bays, and a rear wing on the right. The doorway has a rectangular fanlight, the windows are sashes with raised keystones, and there are three dormers with hipped roofs.	II
John Strongi'th'arm memorial 52.77150°N 1.84462°W	—	1797	The memorial is in the churchyard of St Michael's Church, and is to the memory of John Strongi'th'arm. It is a chest tomb in stone, and has a rectangular plan. The tomb has panelled sides, corner balusters, and a moulded base and cap.	II
Thomas Strongi'th'arm memorial 52.77148°N 1.84467°W		1804	The memorial is in the churchyard of St Michael's Church, and is to the memory of Thomas Strongi'th'arm. It is a chest tomb in stone, and has a rectangular plan. The tomb has panelled sides, corner balusters, a moulded base and cap, and on the west side is a coat of arms and a motto.	II
Former stables, cart sheds and gate pier, Hamstall Hall; 52.77186°N 1.84698°W	—	Early 19th century	The farm buildings contain a considerable amount of earlier material. They have a timber framed core, the external walls are in red brick, and the roof is tiled. The building has one storey and a loft, and contains two segmental-headed doorways, two cart shed openings, two gabled dormers, and a gabled loft door. To the right is a 17th-century gate pier with a square section and a pyramidal cap. Inside, the cross-walls are timber-framed.	II
