= Church of St Michael and All Angels, Hamstall Ridware =

Church of St Michael and All Angels
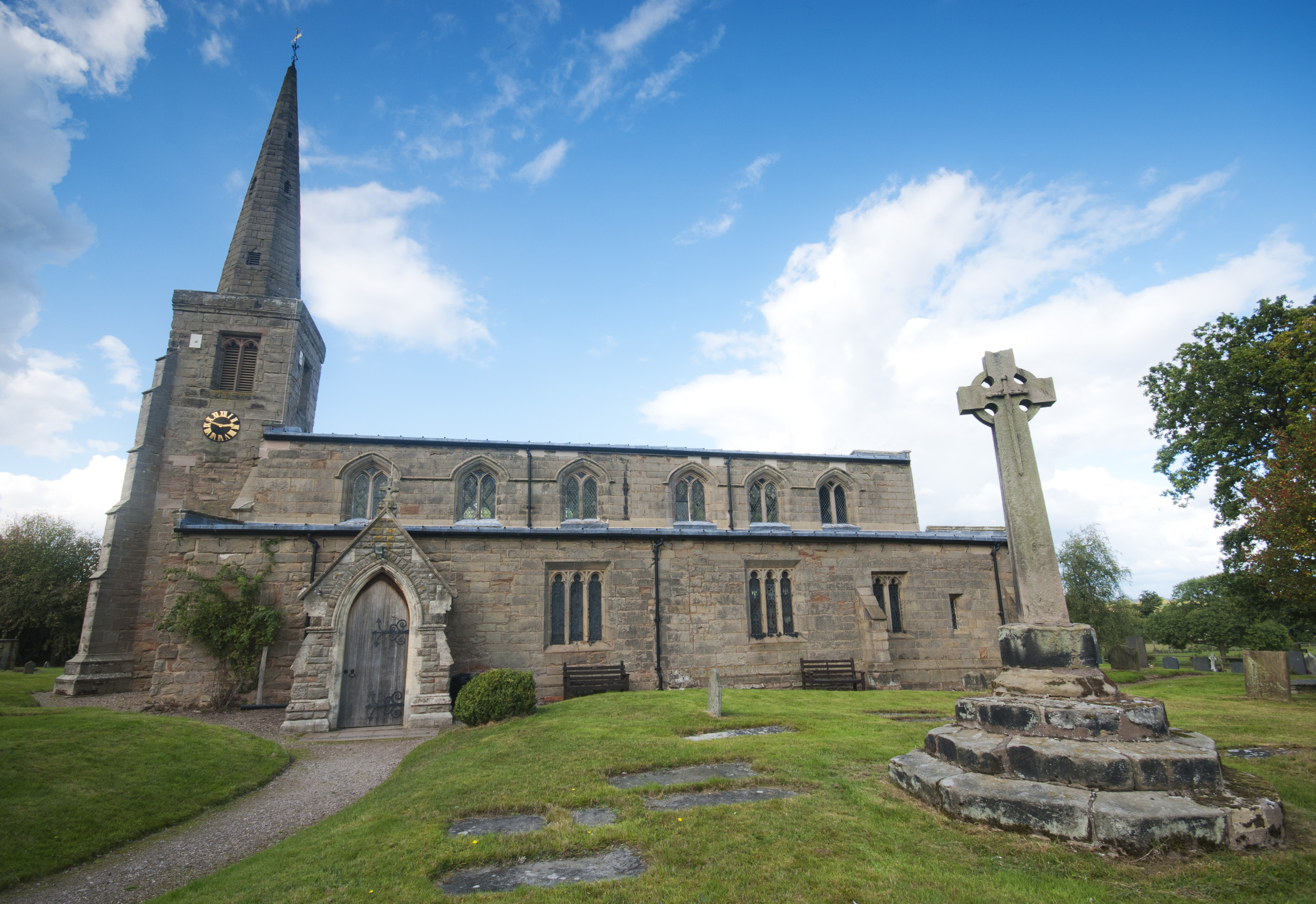
- Church of St Michael and All Angels
- 52.771741°N 1.844824°W
- OS grid reference: SK 10565 19346
- Location: Hamstall Ridware, Staffordshire
- Country: England
- Denomination: Anglican

History
- Founded: 1130—1150

Architecture
- Functional status: Active
- Heritage designation: Grade I
- Architectural type: Church
- Style: Norman

Administration
- Province: Canterbury
- Diocese: Lichfield
- Parish: Lichfield

Clergy
- Vicar: Revd Tyrone John Leyland

The Church of St Michael and All Angels is a parish church and Grade I listed building in the village of Hamstall Ridware, Staffordshire. The church is situated in a remote position to the north of the village accessed by a 250 m (820 ft) pathway through pasture land. The church is situated on a gentle slope 160 m (520 ft) west of the River Blithe. The church was founded in 1130—1150 but the majority of the present church was built of ashlar sandstone in the 14th and 15th centuries.

== History ==
The church was built in around 1130–1150 in the Norman style. The church originally consisted of only the present nave and a short chancel, of the original church only small parts of the west wall still exists. Some Norman masonry can still be seen outside on either side of the tower and on the inside a small Norman window can be seen over the belfry arch in the west wall.

In the 14th and 15th centuries much of the present church as it is today was constructed. In the 14th century the church was lengthened to its present length and the walls raised to their present height. The original small chancel was replaced by the present larger one, a small west tower was added, and the chapels were added on the north and south sides. In the 15th century the north and south aisles were built with 3 bay arcades. The south aisle was extended along the south side of the chancel as a chapel and vestry. The perpendicular clerestory was built and the small west tower was raised to its present height and the recessed spire added. The timbered roof to the nave was replaced in the late 15th century. Later developments included the outer walls of the north chapel being rebuilt in the 18th century and the 19th century gabled south porch.

== Features and monuments ==
- The Cotton Tomb dates from the reign of Henry VIII. The Cottons were Lords of the Manor from 1375 to 1517.
- In the south aisle and outside in the churchyard there are monuments to the Stronginthearm family, who were a family of yeoman farmers.
- The south chapel screen dates from the 16th century and features a Tudor arch.
- The north chapel which is used as an organ chamber and choir vestry has a screen dating from 1520 to 1530.
- The 16th century choir seats originally came from Lichfield Cathedral.
- The stone font and wooden pulpit date from the 19th century.
- The side sections of the reredos with painted panels of the Life of Christ date from the 15th century.
- There are 4 bells, hung 2 over 2 as the belfry has limited space.

== Windows ==
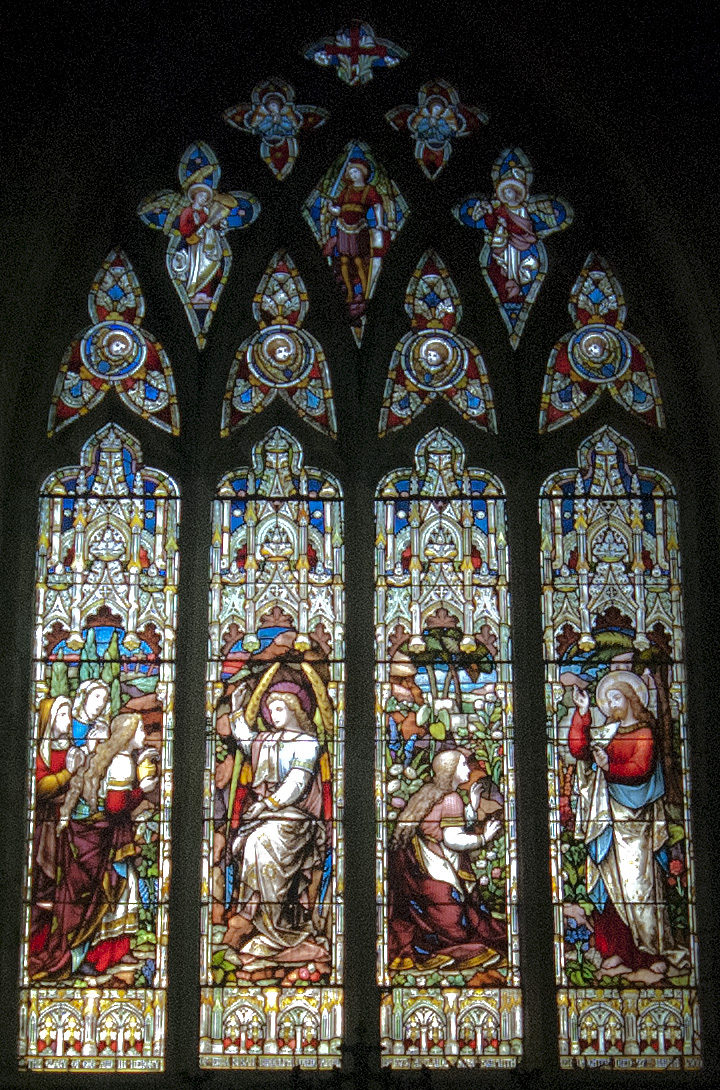
The east window by Ward and Hughes

The oldest stained glass windows date from the 14th century and are located in the south chapel and are dedicated to Saint Cecilia. There are 3 early 16th century windows in the north aisle which depict 9 of the 12 apostles. In the window St John is depicted holding a chalice with a coiled serpent in it. The west window on the south side depicts the 'Baptism of our Lord' and is probably 20th century. A window in the south aisle in dedicated to the memory of Reverend Humberton Skipwith who died in 1911 and carried out restoration of the church. The east window glass is by Ward and Hughes.

== Chalice and paten discovery ==
In 1817 a local farmer, William Jaggard was digging a ditch on an old road near to the Manor House when he discovered a chalice and paten. These rare objects designed to hold wine and bread during communion were made of silver gilt in around 1350. It is presumed that these items were buried during the Protestant Reformation to spare them from destruction. Upon their discovery Jaggard gave them to the Lord of the Manor, Lord Leigh, who had them restored and for a time went on display at the Victoria and Albert Museum. The items are now on display at Lichfield Heritage Centre.

== See also ==
- Grade I listed churches in Staffordshire
- Listed buildings in Hamstall Ridware
