= Listed buildings in Brereton and Ravenhill =

Brereton and Ravenhill is a civil parish in the district of Cannock Chase, Staffordshire, England. It contains eleven buildings that are recorded in the National Heritage List for England. Of these, one is listed at Grade II*, the middle grade, and the other is at Grade II, the lowest grade. The parish contains Brereton, a suburb of the town of Rugeley and the countryside to the southwest. The Trent and Mersey Canal passes through the parish, and the listed buildings associated with this are an accommodation bridge and a viaduct. The other listed buildings are houses and associated structures, a church, a barn, a milestone, and a war memorial.

== Key ==
Grade	Criteria
II*	Particularly important buildings of more than special interest
II	Buildings of national importance and special interest

== Buildings ==
Name and location	Photograph	Date	Notes	Grade
Barn at rear of 179 and 181 Main Road; 52.74315°N 1.91930°W	—	17th century	The barn is in stone with some brick, there is exposed timber framing with infill in brick and stone in the gable ends, and the roof is tiled. There is one storey and a later loft, and the barn contains two doorways and one window.	II
Brereton Hall; 52.74311°N 1.91964°W	—	17th century	Originally a manor house, it was altered in about 1795, and divided into two dwellings soon after 1812. The house is in yellow brick facing the original stone, it has stone dressings, a moulded eaves cornice, and a hipped slate roof. There are three storeys, eleven bays, two rear wings with three storeys, and one with two storeys. On the front is a stone porch with engaged Tuscan half-columns, a radial fanlight, and an entablature, and to the right is a simpler open porch. The windows on the front are sashes, and in the rear wings they are cast iron-framed casements.	II*
The Holly Bush; 52.73585°N 1.93568°W	—	17th century	A house, at one time an inn, it is partly timber framed and partly in brick with applied timbers, and it has a thatched roof. There is one storey and an attic, four bays, and flanking single-storey wings. The doorways have plain surrounds, the windows are casements, and there are two dormers.	II
Cedar Lodge; 52.74365°N 1.92107°W	—	18th century (probable)	A house, later a hotel, it is stuccoed with dentilled eaves, and has a slate roof. There are three storeys and four bays. The lower two storeys of the first and third bays project as convex bows surmounted by wrought iron balconies. Between them is a doorway with Tuscan columns and a cornice hood, and all the windows are sashes in moulded surrounds.	II
Brereton House; 52.74343°N 1.91992°W		Late 18th century	A red brick house with floor bands, side pilasters, moulded eaves and a blocking course. There are three storeys and five bays. In the centre is a stuccoed porch with Tuscan columns, a frieze with triglyphs, and a moulded pediment, and the windows are sashes.	II
Walls, piers, gates and steps, Brereton House; 52.74334°N 1.92007°W	—	Late 18th century	In front of the forecourt are low stone convex walls flanked by rusticated stone piers. Stone steps with scrolled hand rails lead up to the central wrought iron gates with openwork posts.	II
Bridge No. 64; 52.75143°N 1.92153°W		Late 18th century	An accommodation bridge over the Trent and Mersey Canal, it is in red brick with stone coping, and consists of a single segmental-headed arch. The bridge has a hump back, swept wings ending in piers, and there have been some repairs in engineering bricks.	II
Milestone; 52.75331°N 1.93193°W		Early 19th century	The milestone is a rough-cut stone post. It carries a cast iron plate indicating the distances in miles to London, Lichfield, and Stone.	II
St Michael's Church; 52.74514°N 1.92264°W		1837	The church was designed by Thomas Trubshaw in mainly Early English style, enlarged by George Gilbert Scott in 1878, and the tower was remodelled in 1887 by John Oldrid Scott. It is built in grey sandstone with tile roofs, and consists of a nave with a west porch, north and south transepts towards the west end, aisles to the east of them, a chancel with a southwest vestry and a northwest steeple. The steeple has a tower that becomes octagonal towards the top and it is surmounted by a spire. The windows are lancets.	II
Viaduct over Trent and Mersey Canal; 52.75838°N 1.92885°W		Mid 19th century	The viaduct carries a railway over the canal. It is in stone with a brick arch soffit, and consists of a single skewed semicircular arch. The bridge has voussoirs, a moulded cornice, and three concrete buttresses on the north side.	II
War memorial 52.74339°N 1.92056°W		1922	The war memorial is in an enclosed area near a road junction. It is in Cornish granite, and consists of a cross about 4 metres (13 ft) high with truncated arms and a tapering shaft, on a square, tiered plinth and base. On the front is carved a Sword of Sacrifice in relief. The front of the plinth carries inscriptions and the names of those lost in the First World War, and at the foot of the memorial is a plaque with the names of those lost in the Second World War.	II
