= Brereton, Staffordshire =

Village in Staffordshire, England

Coordinates: 52.7456°N 1.9227°W

Brereton
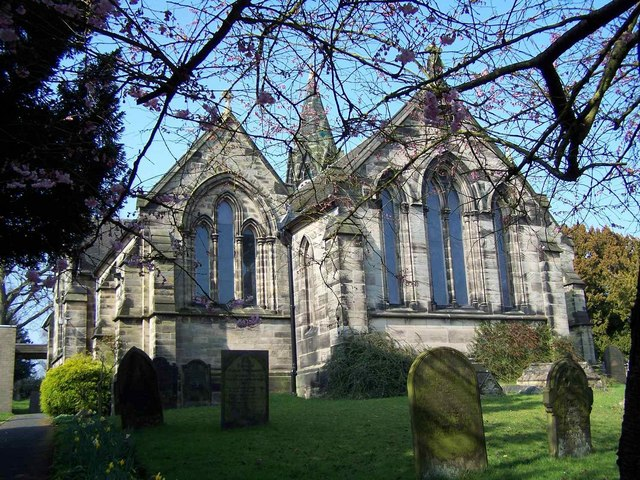
- St. Michael, Brereton

- Location within Staffordshire
- Population: 6,538 (civil parish.2011)
- OS grid reference: SK053164
  - London: 125 miles (201 km)
- Civil parish: Brereton and Ravenhill
- District: Cannock Chase
- Shire county: Staffordshire
- Region: West Midlands
- Country: England
- Sovereign state: United Kingdom
- Post town: RUGELEY
- Postcode district: WS15
- Police: Staffordshire
- Fire: Staffordshire
- Ambulance: West Midlands

Brereton is a village and former civil parish, now in the parish of Brereton and Ravenhill, in the Cannock Chase district, in the county of Staffordshire, England.

== History ==
The village was previously a mining community, with several mines in the Brereton area. The Leahall Mine was the largest and last to close of the local mines, all of which have now ceased to operate. Recently part of the mine area has been redeveloped as the Towers Business Park, set around the Towers Point building. A 2,300-home housing development is now planned for the Leahall site. On the site a new secondary school, commercial facilities, riverside park and sporting facilities are to be included.

== In the village ==
There are several churches within the village. The Brereton Methodist Church, built in 1809, was the first church building in Brereton. There is also the Church of St. Michael's (Church of England).

== Civil parish ==
Brereton was formerly a chapelry in the parish of Rugeley, from 1894 Brereton was a civil parish in its own right, on 1 April 1934 the parish was abolished and merged with Rugeley. In 1931 the parish had a population of 3329. On 1 April 1988 a new parish was formed, on 8 September 1988 the new parish was renamed to "Brereton & Ravenhill". At the 2001 census, the parish had a population of 6,524, increasing to 6,538 at the 2011 Census.

== Notable people ==
- Steve Smith (1896–1980), an English footballer who played 227 games
- Colonel Maurice Buckmaster OBE (1902 at Ravenhill – 1992) the leader of the French section of Special Operations Executive, awarded the Croix de Guerre.

== See also ==
- Listed buildings in Brereton and Ravenhill
- Brereton Social F.C.
