= Handsacre =

Village in Staffordshire, England

Coordinates: 52.74155°N 1.86813°W

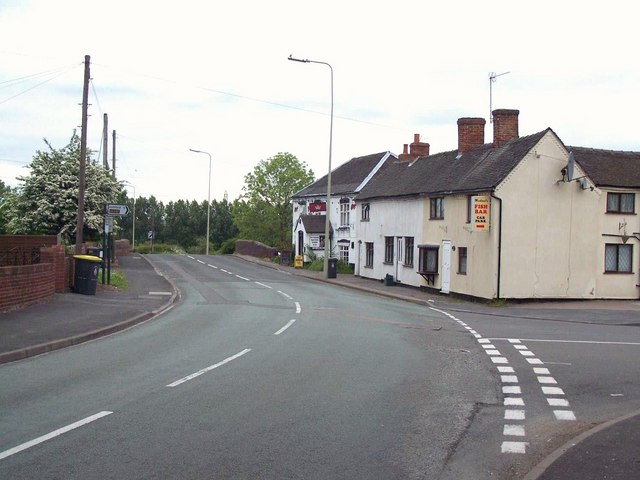
- The A513 and the Crown Public house at Handsacre

- Location within Staffordshire
- OS grid reference: SK0916
- District: Lichfield
- Shire county: Staffordshire
- Region: West Midlands
- Country: England
- Sovereign state: United Kingdom
- Post town: RUGELEY
- Postcode district: WS15
- Dialling code: 01543
- Police: Staffordshire
- Fire: Staffordshire
- Ambulance: West Midlands
- UK Parliament: Lichfield

Handsacre is a village in the English county of Staffordshire. Population details taken at the 2011 census can be found under Armitage with Handsacre

== Location ==
The village lies east of the larger village of Armitage. The village is 5 1/2 miles (9 kilometres) north-northwest of the city of Lichfield and is 3 1/2 miles (5.5 kilometres) southeast of Rugeley. The village sits astride of the A513 road which runs from Tamworth to Stafford.

== Village services ==
Handsacre has one shop, which is a convenience store. There is also a Chinese food take-away and a fish and chip shop. There are two pubs within the village. The public houses are called The Old Peculiar and The Crown. The Crown is adjacent to the canal and has a beer garden. The Old Peculiar is on the corner of Hall Road. The Poplar's Pub on Tuppenhurst Lane closed in 2008 and was demolished in June 2010. As of June 2011, twenty houses have been built and are currently occupied.

=== Schools ===
The village school is called Hayes Meadow Primary School. The school caters for children from the age of 3 plus, who attend the purpose built nursery unit, to the age of 11. The Headteacher is Sarah Sivieri. The school is also home to its PTA organisation, The Friends of Hayes Meadow (Charity number 1087977). The charity organises events such as Summer Fayres, BBQs, Craft Fairs and the most successful fundraiser, the Santa Float. Events like these allow the charity to provide students with extra things such as climbing frames, play equipment, selection boxes etc.

=== Playgrounds ===
There is a children's play park at the end of Harvey Road on St Barbara's Road in the north easterly part of the village. The playpark was refurbished in 2009.

=== Transport ===
The village is currently served seven days per week by Chaserider bus service 828 linking the village with Rugeley and Stafford in the west direction, and Lichfield south east. The village is also served by Bus service 63, which previously terminated at Rugeley, but now extends via Handsacre linking the village to Hill Ridware, Rugeley, Hednesford, Cannock and Uttoxeter.

High Bridge crosses the River Trent on the edge of the village, carrying to the road to Mavesyn Ridware.

Handsacre gives its name to Handsacre junction which will serve as the end to HS2 where it meets the West Coast Mainline for trains to carry on up north.

== Trent and Mersey Canal ==
The Trent and Mersey Canal skirts around the northern edge of the village. This canal was designed and built by James Brindley who died in 1777, before the canal was completed. The A513 road crosses the canal with the Crown public house next to the bridge designated bridge 56 here. This bridge is a little way west of two further bridges which cross the canal which are Grade II listed structures. these bridges are designated bridges 59 and 60.

== Rail ==
The West Coast Main Line runs through the village although the nearest railway station is at Rugeley which is four miles (six kilometres) to the northwest. The new High Speed 2 rail line is planned to join with the West Coast Main Line near Handsacre.

== Population ==
Handsacre has a population of 5,355 people living in the ward of Armitage with Handsacre.

== See also ==
- Listed buildings in Armitage with Handsacre

== Gallery ==
Handsacre

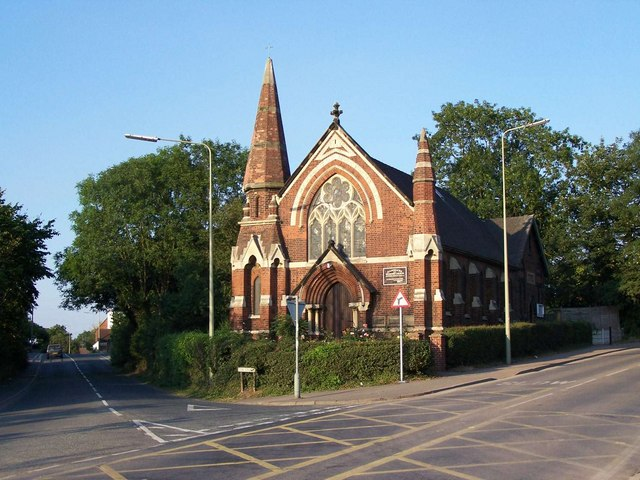
Handsacre Methodist Church

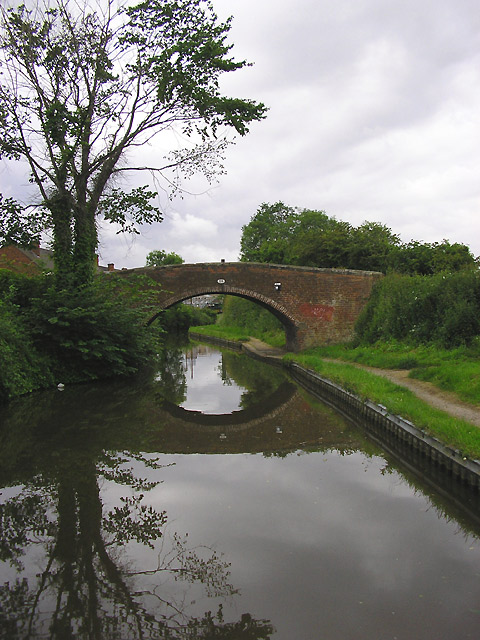
Trent and Mersey Canal at Handsacre

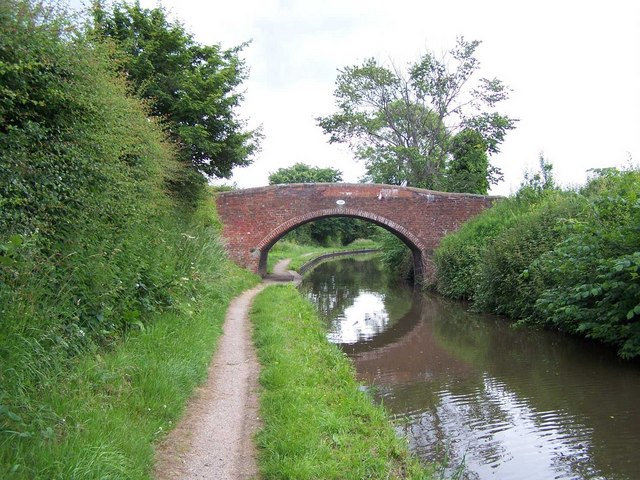
Grade II listed Bridge 59
