= Hill Ridware =

Village in Staffordshire, England

Coordinates: 52.758369°N 1.880748°W

Hill Ridware is a small village in the civil parish of Mavesyn Ridware in the Lichfield District of Staffordshire, England. It is the largest settlement in the parish with a population of 857 at the 2011 Census. Situated across the River Trent from Rugeley, it is on the B5104 north of Armitage.

Facilities in the village include one public house and the Henry Chadwick Primary School. There is also a village hall that hosts a variety of events. There is also a children's play park and field on the village hall grounds. Currently 48 new houses are in development on former farmland, estimated to be completed late 2018.

The late 18th-century Ridware Hall is on Wade Lane on the western side of the village. Its attached coach house and stable block survive. It is a Grade II listed building.

== See also ==
- Listed buildings in Mavesyn Ridware
