= Mavesyn Ridware =

Village in Staffordshire, England

Coordinates: 52.749992°N 1.882105°W

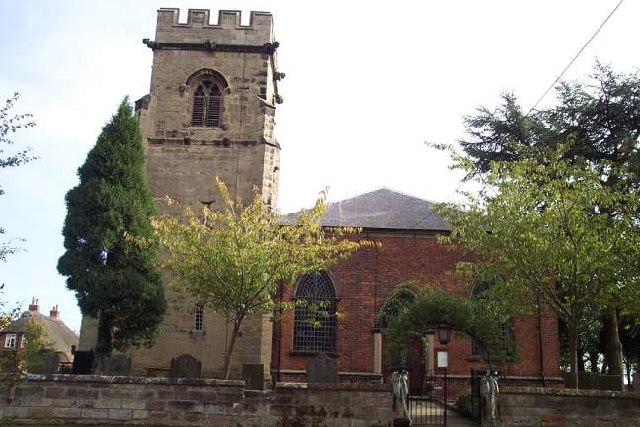
- St Nicholas Church

- Location within Staffordshire
- Population: 1,128 (2011)
- OS grid reference: SK082169
- Civil parish: Mavesyn Ridware
- District: Lichfield
- Shire county: Staffordshire
- Region: West Midlands
- Country: England
- Sovereign state: United Kingdom
- Post town: RUGELEY
- Postcode district: WS15
- Dialling code: 01543
- Police: Staffordshire
- Fire: Staffordshire
- Ambulance: West Midlands
- UK Parliament: Lichfield

Mavesyn Ridware is a village and civil parish in Lichfield District, Staffordshire, England. The parish had a population of 1,048 in 2001, increasing to 1,128 at the 2011 Census. It includes the villages of Hill Ridware, Rake End, Pipe Ridware and Blithbury, all of which lie between the River Trent and a small tributary, the River Blithe. To the east is the parish of Hamstall Ridware and to the south the larger village of Armitage.

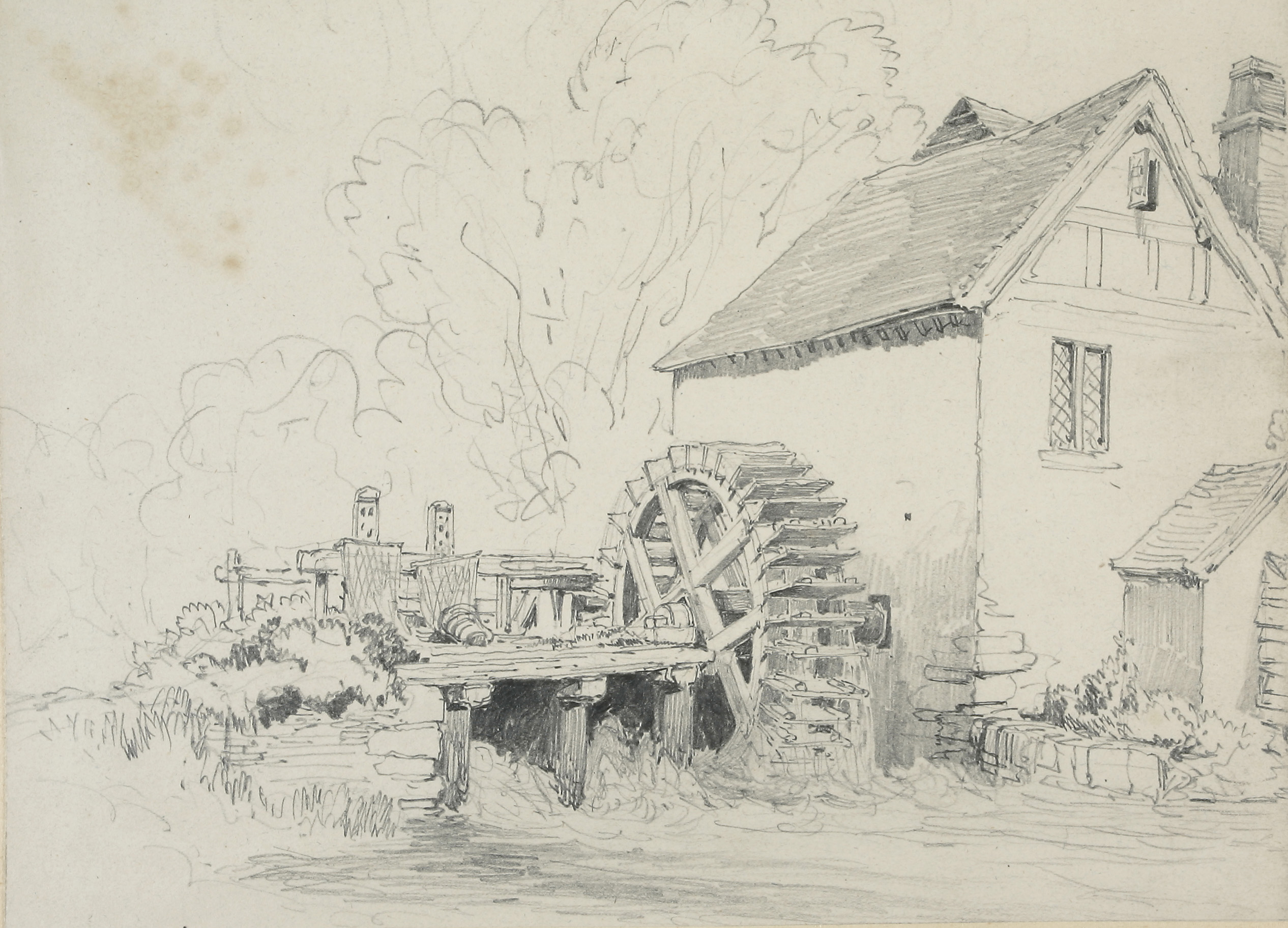
Drawing, believed to be of Mavesyn Ridware mill, 1873 or 1874, by Henry Harris Lines

== Heritage ==
Mavesyn Ridware contains two notable buildings: the parish church dedicated to St Nicholas and the Gatehouse of the erstwhile Manor House.

The name "Mavesyn" derives from the French Malvoisin, which was the name of the Norman family that acquired the estate after the Norman Conquest of 1066. The church contains many monuments to members of that family and to their successors as lords of the manor, the Cawardens and the Chadwicks.

The Gatehouse is timber framed with a later skin of brick and stone. Growth rings on the timbers indicate that the building was erected in 1391–1392.

High Bridge crosses the River Trent on the edge of the parish, carrying to the road to Handsacre.

== Amenities ==
The village is not served by public transport, other than a minibus service to Handsacre or Rugeley, which must be booked in advance by phone or on the web. The nearest railway station is at Rugeley (5 miles, 8 km).

Ridware has a bowls club and a youth club. There is a village hall for hire.

== Notable residents ==
- Henry Fourdrinier (1766–1854), paper manufacturer and inventor, spent his last years at the Old Rectory.
- Ashby Haslewood (1810–1876), first-class cricketer and educationalist, was rector of Mavesyn Ridware in 1866–1876.

== See also ==
- Listed buildings in Mavesyn Ridware
