= Pipe Ridware =

Village in England

Coordinates: 52.7580°N 1.8595°W

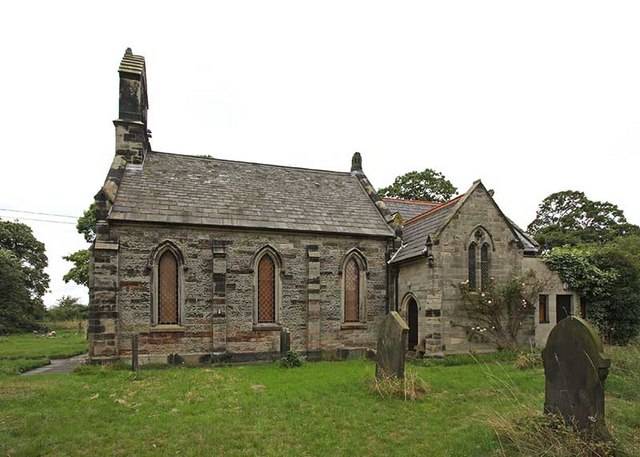
- Ridware Theatre

- Location within Staffordshire
- Civil parish: Mavesyn Ridware
- District: Lichfield
- Shire county: Staffordshire
- Region: West Midlands
- Country: England
- Sovereign state: United Kingdom
- Police: Staffordshire
- Fire: Staffordshire
- Ambulance: West Midlands

Pipe Ridware is a village in the civil parish of Mavesyn Ridware, in the Lichfield district, in the county of Staffordshire, England. It is about 5 miles from Lichfield. It is on the north side of the River Trent. St James Church is now a venue.

== History ==
The name "Ridware" means 'Dwellers at Rid', 'Rid' probably means 'ford', the "Pipe" part comes from Robert de Pipe who held it in 1285. Pipe Ridware was recorded in the Domesday Book as Rid(e)ware/Ridvare. Pipe Ridware was in North Offlow hundred. In 1894 Pipe Ridware became part of Lichfield Rural District, on 1 April 1934 the parish was abolished and merged with Mavesyn Ridware. At the 1931 census (the last before the abolition of the parish), Pipe Ridware had a population of 52. In 1974 Pipe Ridware became part of Lichfield non-metropolitan district in the non-metropolitan county of Staffordshire.
