= 2019 Stafford Borough Council election =

2019 UK local government election

- 2 May 2019

All 40 seats to Stafford Borough Council 21 seats needed for a majority

	First party	Second party
Party	Conservative	Labour
Last election	29 seats, 48.0%	9 seats, 22.6%
Seats won	22	10
Seat change	▼7	▲1
Popular vote	26,218	14,718
Percentage	48.5%	27.2%
Swing	▲0.5%	▲4.6%
	Third party	Fourth party
Party	Independent	Green
Last election	2 seats, 11.8%	0 seats, 3.3%
Seats won	7	1
Seat change	▲5	▲1
Popular vote	7,940	1,622
Percentage	14.7%	3.0%
Swing	▲2.9%	▼0.3%
- Results by ward
Council control before election
Conservative
Council control after election
Conservative

Elections to Stafford Borough Council were held on Thursday 2 May 2019.

== Summary ==
=== Election result ===
2019 Stafford Borough Council election
Party	Candidates	Seats	Gains	Losses	Net gain/loss	Seats %	Votes %	Votes	+/−
Conservative	39	22	0	7	▼7	55.0	48.5	26,218	+0.5
Labour	31	10	1	0	▲1	25.0	27.2	14,718	+4.6
Independent	9	7	5	0	▲5	17.5	14.7	7,940	+2.9
Green	6	1	1	0	▲1	2.5	3.0	1,622	–0.3
UKIP	12	0	0	0	Steady	0.0	5.6	3,043	–0.8
Liberal Democrats	1	0	0	0	Steady	0.0	0.9	490	+0.4

== Ward results ==
=== Barlaston ===
Barlaston
Party	Candidate	Votes	%	±%
Conservative	Evan Jones	570	76.4	−23.6
UKIP	Karen Jones	176	23.6	New
Majority				
Turnout		746	36.1	
Rejected ballots		53	6.6	
Conservative hold		Swing		

=== Baswich ===
Baswich
Party	Candidate	Votes	%	±%
Conservative	Ann Edgeller	1,233	63.8	
Conservative	Marnie Phillips	923	47.7	
Labour	Rich Duffy	581	30.1	
Labour	Sophie Wain	564	29.2	
UKIP	Ellis Stones	297	15.4	
Majority				
Turnout			39.1	
Rejected ballots		21	0.6	
Conservative hold				
Conservative hold				

=== Common ===
Common
Party	Candidate	Votes	%	±%
Labour Co-op	Aidan Godfrey	374	49.4	+8.5
Green	Andy Murray	132	17.4	+9.5
UKIP	Victor Edwards	126	16.6	+2.1
Conservative	Joy Jones	125	16.5	−7.9
Majority				
Turnout		757	24.5	
Rejected ballots		6	0.8	
Labour Co-op hold		Swing		

=== Coton ===
Coton
Party	Candidate	Votes	%	±%
Labour	Jack Kemp	745	64.3	
Labour	Louise Nixon	695	60.0	
Conservative	James Cantrill	385	33.2	
Conservative	Lindsey Douglas	374	32.3	
Majority				
Turnout			23.3	
Rejected ballots		54	2.4	
Labour hold				
Labour hold				

=== Doxey and Castletown ===
Doxey and Castletown
Party	Candidate	Votes	%	±%
Green	Tony Pearce	557	58.8	+42.9
Conservative	Isabella Davies	221	23.3	−11.0
Labour	Eleanor Tristram	169	17.8	−8.1
Majority				
Turnout		947	35.1	
Rejected ballots		11	1.1	
Green gain from Conservative		Swing		

=== Eccleshall ===
Eccleshall
Party	Candidate	Votes	%	±%
Conservative	Jeremy Pert	1,180	64.4	
Conservative	Peter Jones	1,131	61.7	
UKIP	Tony Pace	458	25.0	
Labour	Bill Lockwood	340	18.5	New
Majority				
Turnout			35.2	
Rejected ballots		25	0.8	
Conservative hold				
Conservative hold				

=== Forebridge ===
Forebridge
Party	Candidate	Votes	%	±%
Independent	Chris Baron	488	60.7	+23.2
Labour	Stuart Nixon	245	30.5	−4.8
UKIP	Robert Stephens	71	8.8	New
Majority				
Turnout		804	32.7	
Rejected ballots		6	0.7	
Independent hold		Swing		

=== Fulford ===
Fulford
Party	Candidate	Votes	%	±%
Conservative	Peter Roycroft	780	58.3	
Conservative	Michael Dodson	752	56.2	
Liberal Democrats	Alec Sandiford	490	36.6	New
Labour	Jule Whittaker	316	23.6	New
Majority				
Turnout			28.3	
Rejected ballots		33	1.4	
Conservative hold				
Conservative hold				

=== Gnosall and Woodseaves ===
Gnosall and Woodseaves
Party	Candidate	Votes	%	±%
Conservative	Patrick Farrington	1,174	56.5	
Conservative	Mike Smith	1,152	55.4	
Labour	Gail Gregory	600	28.9	
UKIP	Susan Harris	470	22.6	
Majority				
Turnout			38.1	
Rejected ballots		22	0.6	
Conservative hold				
Conservative hold				

=== Haywood and Hixon ===
Haywood and Hixon
Party	Candidate	Votes	%	±%
Independent	Brendan McKeown	733	38.6	
Conservative	Alexander Brown	655	34.5	
Conservative	Alan Perkins	619	32.6	
Labour	Suzanne O'Farrell	310	16.3	
Labour	Mick Kelly	286	15.1	
Majority				
Turnout			35.1	
Rejected ballots		42	1.6	
Independent gain from Conservative				
Conservative hold				

=== Highfields and Western Downs ===
Highfields and Western Downs
Party	Candidate	Votes	%	±%
Labour	Michael Holmes	629	53.6	
Labour	Dee Holbrook-Summers	627	53.4	
Conservative	Victoria Jenkinson	500	42.6	
Conservative	Rebecca Davis	498	42.4	
Majority				
Turnout			24.2	
Rejected ballots		48	2.1	
Labour hold				
Labour hold				

=== Holmcroft ===
Holmcroft
Party	Candidate	Votes	%	±%
Conservative	Jonathan Price	956	50.1	
Conservative	Bryan Cross	937	49.1	
Labour	Yvonne Jordan	504	26.4	
Labour	Julian Thorley	430	22.5	
Green	Emma Carter	273	14.3	
UKIP	Sam Falconer	270	14.1	New
UKIP	John Jeffrey	259	13.6	New
Majority				
Turnout			34.9	
Rejected ballots		12	0.3	
Conservative hold				
Conservative hold				

=== Littleworth ===
Littleworth
Party	Candidate	Votes	%	±%
Labour Co-op	Gillian Pardesi	573	38.2	
Labour Co-op	Tony Nixon	530	35.3	
Conservative	Stewart Bishop	451	30.0	
Conservative	Mary Jennings	415	27.6	
Independent	Rowan Draper	272	18.1	New
Green	Michael Spight	261	17.4	
UKIP	Paul Williams	220	14.7	
UKIP	Marcus Hoffmann de Visme	168	11.2	
Majority				
Turnout			34.3	
Rejected ballots		2	0.1	
Labour Co-op hold				
Labour Co-op gain from Conservative				

=== Manor ===
Manor
Party	Candidate	Votes	%	±%
Labour	Angela Loughran	737	53.6	
Labour	Anne Hobbs	710	51.6	
Conservative	Mike Heenan	591	43.0	
Conservative	Emily Lewis	572	41.6	
Majority				
Turnout			26.9	
Rejected ballots		71	2.6	
Labour hold				
Labour hold				

=== Milford ===
Milford
Party	Candidate	Votes	%	±%
Conservative	Andy Cooper	530	56.0	+8.0
Labour	Paul Martlew	215	22.7	+7.3
Green	Ann Elphick	201	21.2	New
Majority				
Turnout		946	39.2	
Rejected ballots		13	1.4	
Conservative hold		Swing		

=== Milwich ===
Milwich
Party	Candidate	Votes	%	±%
Conservative	Frances Beatty	878	52.0	
Conservative	Andrew Harp	841	49.8	
Independent	Jim Davies	678	40.2	New
Labour	Jim Livesey	303	18.0	New
UKIP	Edward Whitfield	265	15.7	New
Majority				
Turnout			35.0	
Rejected ballots		16	0.5	
Conservative hold				
Conservative hold				

=== Penkside ===
Penkside
Party	Candidate	Votes	%	±%
Labour	Ralph Cooke	389	62.6	+18.0
Conservative	Andrew Edwards	232	37.4	+9.4
Majority				
Turnout		621	25.0	
Rejected ballots		26	4.0	
Labour hold		Swing		

=== Rowley ===
Rowley
Party	Candidate	Votes	%	±%
Conservative	Carolyn Trowbridge	513	52.1	−1.2
Labour	Edward Smith	273	27.7	−8.9
Green	Douglas Rouxel	198	20.1	+10.1
Majority				
Turnout		984	40.1	
Rejected ballots		12	1.2	
Conservative hold		Swing		

=== Seighford and Church Eaton ===
Seighford and Church Eaton
Party	Candidate	Votes	%	±%
Conservative	Ray Sutherland	1,191	70.2	
Conservative	Mark Winnington	1,189	70.1	
Labour Co-op	Trevor Fisher	486	28.6	
Majority				
Turnout			35.1	
Rejected ballots		59	2.0	
Conservative hold				
Conservative hold				

=== St. Michael's and Stonefield ===
St. Michael's and Stonefield
Party	Candidate	Votes	%	±%
Independent	Rob Kenney	1,243	48.9	
Independent	Philip Leason	1,238	48.7	
Independent	Ian Fordham	1,117	44.0	
Conservative	Lynne Bakker-Collier	637	25.1	
Conservative	William Carlin	615	24.2	
Conservative	Geoff Collier	604	23.8	
Labour	Sally Osborne-Town	477	18.8	
Labour	Mike Osborne-Town	470	18.5	
Labour	Cathy Gregory	466	18.3	
UKIP	Andrew Illsley	263	10.4	
Majority				
Turnout			32.4	
Rejected ballots		40	0.6	
Independent gain from Conservative				
Independent gain from Conservative				
Independent gain from Conservative				

=== Swynnerton and Oulton ===
Swynnerton and Oulton
Party	Candidate	Votes	%	±%
Conservative	Roy James	Unopposed		
Conservative	James Nixon	Unopposed		
Majority		–	–	
Turnout		–	–	
Conservative hold				
Conservative hold				

=== Walton ===
Walton
Party	Candidate	Votes	%	±%
Independent	Jill Hood	1,256	73.8	
Independent	Mark Green	915	53.7	
Conservative	Mike Williamson	372	21.8	
Labour	Tracey Lindop	342	20.1	
Conservative	Adrian Harding	312	18.3	
Majority				
Turnout			34.1	
Rejected ballots		9	0.3	
Independent hold				
Independent gain from Conservative				

=== Weeping Cross and Wildwood ===
Weeping Cross and Wildwood
Party	Candidate	Votes	%	±%
Conservative	Jenny Barron	1,065	60.9	
Conservative	Ray Barron	1,045	59.7	
Labour	Daniel Cadden	671	38.3	
Labour	Julie Read	661	37.8	
Majority				
Turnout			38.4	
Rejected ballots		57	1.6	
Conservative hold				
Conservative hold				

== Changes 2019–2023 ==
Jenny Barron and Ray Barron, both elected as Conservatives, left the party in March 2022 to sit as independents. This caused the Conservatives to lose their majority, placing the council under no overall control.

In March 2023, in the run-up to the next election, eight of the nine independent councillors formally registered themselves as a political party called the Stafford Borough Independents.
