= Tillington =

Tillington may refer to more than one place in England:

- Tillington, Herefordshire
- Tillington, Staffordshire
- Tillington, West Sussex
