= Hyde Lea =

Village and parish in Staffordshire, England

Coordinates: 52°46′39″N 2°07′57″W

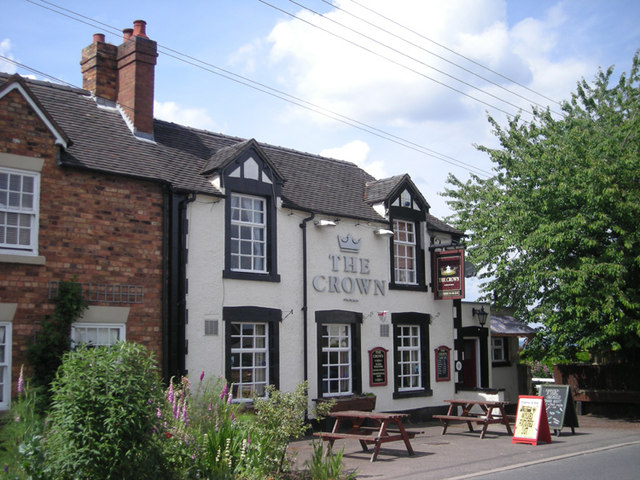
The Crown at Hyde Lea

Hyde Lea is a village and parish in Staffordshire, England, just west of Stafford itself.

Hyde Lea borders the southern boundary of Castle Church parish. It is made up of a detached strip of land between Thorneyfields Lane and Burton Manor. The small village became part of Castle Church parish in 1881.

By the time of the 2011 census Hyde Lea had become a civil parish in its own name. The population as of the 2011 census was 451.

'The Hyde' was mentioned as far back as the Domesday Book. By 1788 Hyde Lea common was ringed by small encroachments and by about 1840 there were a few cottages there, several dating from the late 18th century.

Hyde Lea boasted a school from 1863, but it closed in 1980, children only staying there between the ages of 5 and 7 by this time. The village hall site is now owned by the trustees (the community). In the 1980s the Diocese allowed the community to use the school as a village hall on licence until the trustees purchased it in the early 1990s.

It contains a Scheduled Monument in the form of a moated site and fishpond used for water management at the head of the valley of Rising Brook.

Stafford Grammar School is within the parish.
