= Charles Twigg =

English-born South African cricketer

Personal information
- Full name: Charles Hanbury Twigg
- Born: 29 January 1893; Weeping Cross, Staffordshire, England
- Died: 18 June 1986 (aged 93); Pietermaritzburg, Natal, South Africa
- Batting: Unknown
- Bowling: Unknown

Domestic team information
- Years: Team
- 1915/16–1916/17: Europeans
- 1926/27–1930/31: Eastern Province

Career statistics
Competition	First-class
Matches	6
Runs scored	67
Batting average	7.44
100s/50s	–/–
Top score	25*
Balls bowled	798
Wickets	11
Bowling average	42.90
5 wickets in innings	–
10 wickets in match	–
Best bowling	3/25
Catches/stumpings	1/–
- Source: ESPNcricinfo, 24 November 2022

Charles Hanbury Twigg (29 January 1893 – 18 June 1986) was an English-born South African first-class cricketer.

The son of H. Twigg, he was born at Weeping Cross near Stafford in January 1893, and was educated at Repton School. After completing his education, he went to British India. While in India, he played first-class cricket for the Europeans cricket team on two occasions in the Madras Presidency Matches of 1915 and 1917. Twigg served in the First World War in the British Indian Army Reserve, being commissioned as a second lieutenant in May 1917. He had immigrated to South Africa by the 1920s, where he played first-class cricket for Eastern Province on four occasions between 1926 and 1931, three of which came in the Currie Cup, with a fourth against the touring Marylebone Cricket Club. Across six first-class matches, Twigg scored 67 runs at an average of 7.44, with a highest score of 25 not out. With his bowling, he took 11 wickets at a bowling average of 42.90, with best figures of 3 for 25. Twigg ran a business in South Africa manufacturing children's carriages. He died at Pietermaritzburg in June 1986. His brother was the field hockey international Walter Twigg.
