= King Edward VI High School, Stafford =

King Edward VI High School

Location
- West Way; Stafford, Staffordshire, ST17 9YJ; England; 52°47′46″N 2°07′51″W

Information
- Type: Academy
- Established: 1977
- Local authority: Staffordshire
- Trust: Walton Multi-Academy Trust
- Department for Education URN: 149328 Tables
- Ofsted: Reports
- Headteacher: Jason Christey
- Gender: Coeducational
- Age: 11 to 18
- Enrolment: 628 as of June 2022
- Houses: Churchill, Matthews, Nightingale, Curie
- Colours: Blue and gold
- Publication: The Edwardian
- Website: www.kevi.org.uk

King Edward VI High School is a coeducational secondary school and sixth form located in the Highfields area of Stafford, England. The school's sixth form forms part of the Stafford Collegiate. It is a non-selective state school admitting boys and girls from ages 11–18. The school was formed in 1977 following the amalgamation of King Edward VI Boys’ Grammar School and Stafford Girls’ High School.

== Introduction ==
King Edward VI High School serves mainly the west of Stafford to the Shropshire border, and admits students aged between 11 – 19 years.

The school catchment area includes Western Downs, the Rowley Avenue area, Forebridge, Doxey, the top end of the Highfields Estate and the villages to the west of Stafford i.e. Bradley, Derrington, Seighford, Haughton, Gnosall, Church Eaton and Woodseaves.

The school was formed by merging the long established selective schools, King Edward VI Boys’ Grammar School and Stafford Girls’ High School, in 1977. The selective element was removed in order to create the comprehensive school taking pupils of all abilities. The premises of the Girls’ High School were enlarged and the school was based there.

The closure of the old grammar school led to the creation of the independent fee-paying Stafford Grammar School.

== School history ==
=== King Edward VI Boys Grammar School ===
The Free Grammar School of King Edward VI was first established in Stafford in 1550 to provide free education to young boys.

In 1862 a new building was erected for the school on Newport Road and would serve as the home of the boys' grammar school for well over 100 years.

The old King Edward VI building on Newport Road remained in education hands and was turned over to Chetwynd Middle School before later becoming what is now known as the Chetwynd Centre, home of the Stafford Collegiate, where many Post-16 subjects are taught as part of an agreement between the Stafford secondary schools and Stafford College of Further Education.

=== Stafford Girls' High School ===
Stafford Girls' High School was established in 1907 as a grammar school for girls and was based at The Oval, just off the Lichfield Road, with some accommodation for students at The Hough Cottage (now an Italian restaurant). The school later moved to a new site off West Way, close to Stafford Castle; the modern home of King Edward VI High School.

In 1977 King Edward VI Grammar School and Stafford Girls' High School were amalgamated to create a comprehensive off West Way.

=== Amalgamation ===
The two schools merged in September 1976, with King Edwards VI Boys Grammar vacating their site to move to the Stafford Girls' High School site off Newport Road.

The old girls' school buildings on The Oval also remained in education hands, later becoming an art college before being converted into residential apartments.

=== Recent history ===
In 2003, Colin Elstone was appointed as Headteacher, serving until 2010 before his retirement. The school achieved its Ofsted status as "Good with outstanding features" under his leadership. From 2010 to 2014 the Headteacher was Russell Davis, before the current Headteacher, and former Deputy Headteacher, Jason Christey was appointed in 2015. The school achieved another "Good" Ofsted rating during its inspection in 2018.

Previously a community school administered by Staffordshire County Council, In September 2022 King Edward VI High School converted to academy status. The school is now sponsored by the Walton Multi-Academy Trust.

== Notable former pupils ==
- Alfred Averill (1865–1957) the second Anglican Archbishop of New Zealand, 1925 to 1940
- Jean Augur (1934–1993), British teacher and dyslexia activist
- Patrick Fyffe (1942–2002) a female impersonator, e.g. Dame Hilda Bracket, alongside George Logan as Dr Evadne Hinge played the duo "Hinge and Bracket"
- Peter Haycock (1951–2013) blues rock musician and film score composer, began as lead guitarist, vocalist, and founding member of the Climax Blues Band
- Sarah Buck OBE (born 1953) an English structural and civil engineer and business woman
- Carol Ann Duffy (born 1955) a British poet and playwright; Poet Laureate, 2009-2019
- Nick Stafford (born 1959 as Nicholas Thomas) a British playwright and writer
- James Sutton (born 1983 as James Cook) an English television actor
- Aly Muldowney (born 1983) a professional rugby union player
- Niko Omilana (born 1998) professional YouTuber
