= Moss Pit =

Coal merchants

Moss Pit. William Moss & Son were builders, railway contractors and coal merchants in Stafford from 1855 to 1884 when William Moss was killed at his sand and gravel pit now called Moss Pit. William Moss and his son Samuel built railway lines around the Midlands including the Queensville curve in Stafford. Around 1916 to 1918 William's grandson Percy George Shaw Moss was an alderman of the Borough of Stafford in the West Midlands.
