= Astonfields Balancing Lakes =

Nature reserve in Staffordshire, England

- Location within Staffordshire
- Interactive map of Astonfields Balancing Lakes
- Location: Stafford, Staffordshire
- OS grid: SJ 926 248
- Coordinates: 52.8211°N 2.1119°W
- Area: 4 hectares (9.9 acres)
- Designation: Local nature reserve Site of Biological Importance
- Website: Astonfields Balancing Lakes

Astonfields Balancing Lakes is a local nature reserve on the north-eastern edge of Stafford, in Staffordshire, England.

The main purpose of the balancing lakes is flood defence; the site has also been developed for wildlife habitats. Its area is about 4 hectares (9.9 acres), and it is designated a Grade 1 Site of Biological Importance.

== History and description ==
The site of the lakes was once wet meadowland. The balancing lakes were constructed to help protect Stafford from flooding, the northern lake in the late 1970s, and the southern lake in 1990.

At the northern edge of the site is the former line of the Stafford and Uttoxeter Railway, now a cycle route. The Astonfields Industrial Estate, west of the lakes, was formerly a salt works, extracting saline groundwater; the salt-rich waste deposits remain.

The lakes are now important for wildlife, and the site is managed in order to protect and improve it. The northern lake is mostly open water, and has a small amount of vegetation. The southern lake, containing little open water, includes a reed bed and a small area of salt marsh. It provides a habitat for water rail and snipe. There are hedgerows and woodland at the fringes of the site, a habitat for various warblers and other species.
