= Listed buildings in Hixon, Staffordshire =

Hixon is a civil parish in the Borough of Stafford, Staffordshire, England. It contains seven listed buildings that are recorded in the National Heritage List for England. All the listed buildings are designated at Grade II, the lowest of the three grades, which is applied to "buildings of national importance and special interest". The parish includes the village of Hixon and the surrounding area. The listed buildings consist of houses, farmhouses, a public house, a church, and an accommodation bridge over the Trent and Mersey Canal.

== Buildings ==
Name and location	Photograph	Date	Notes
New Road Farmhouse; 52.83068°N 1.99996°W	—	14th to 15th century (probable)	The farmhouse, which was originally timber framed with cruck construction, was largely rebuilt in the 17th century, and much of the external walling was further rebuilt in the 19th century. There is one storey and an attic, and a T-shaped plan, with a hall range of three bays, and a cross-wing on the left. At the rear is a lean-to porch, the windows date from the 20th century, and there are two gabled dormers.
Bank House Public House; 52.83156°N 1.99430°W		17th century (probable)	The public house, which has a timber framed core, was largely remodelled and extended in brick in the 18th century. It has a dentilled eaves course and a tile roof. There are two storeys and four bays. On the front is a projecting porch with a gable over the doorway. The windows are casements, and to the right is a two-storey canted bay window. Inside, there is exposed timber framing.
Mount Pleasant, Puddle Hill; 52.83157°N 2.00996°W	—	Late 17th century (probable)	The house is timber framed with painted brick infill and a tile roof. There are two storeys, and an L-shaped plan, with three bays on the front, and a later rear brick wing. In the centre is a gabled porch, and the windows are casements.
Bridge No. 77 (Pasturefields Bridge); 52.82075°N 2.00996°W}		Late 18th century	An accommodation bridge over the Trent and Mersey Canal, it is in brick with stone coping, and consists of a single segmental arch with a humped back. The bridge has swept wings ending in piers at all four corners.
Wychdon Lodge and outbuildings 52.82776°N 2.01811°W	—	c. 1807	The house is in brick on a stone plinth with rendering, a string course, and a hipped tile roof. There are two storeys and a basement, and a double pile plan, with an entrance front of three bays. In the centre is a tetrastyle portico with unfluted Doric columns and a deep cornice, and the doorway has panelled pilasters. The windows are sashes. To the northeast of the house is a walled garden and outbuildings that include a stable, a coach house, and a hay store.
Ivyhouse Farmhouse; 52.83003°N 1.99616°W	—	c. 1835	A red brick farmhouse on a stone plinth, with an eaves cornice and a tile roof. There are two storeys and an attic, four bays, and a rear kitchen wing on the left. The doorway has a rectangular fanlight and the windows are casements; all have hood moulds, and some have transoms.
St Peter's Church; 52.82740°N 2.00020°W		1848	The church was designed by George Gilbert Scott in Early English style. It is in stone, and consists of a nave, a south porch, a long chancel, and a north steeple. The steeple has a tower, and a broach spire with lucarnes.
