= Beaconside =

Area of Stafford, England

Coordinates: 52.81°N 02.10°W

- Location within Staffordshire
- OS grid reference: SJ9324
- Shire county: Staffordshire
- Region: West Midlands
- Country: England
- Sovereign state: United Kingdom
- Post town: Stafford
- Postcode district: ST18
- Police: Staffordshire
- Fire: Staffordshire
- Ambulance: West Midlands
- UK Parliament: Stafford

Beaconside is an area of Stafford, England. It is home to the Ministry of Defence's Stafford site, which was formerly a Royal Air Force base. Staffordshire University's Stafford campus was also located in the area until its closure in 2014. Beaconside shares its name with a major road in the area, which forms part of the A513 road.
