= Jean Augur =

- Born: Jean Florence Thomas; 24 March 1934; Cannock, Staffordshire, England
- Died: 15 August 1993 (aged 59); Esher, Surrey, England
- Occupation: Special education teacher
- Known for: Dyslexia activist
- Spouse: Frank Augur (m. 1956)
- Children: 3

Jean Florence Augur (née Thomas; 24 March 1934 – 15 August 1993) was a British educationalist, special education teacher, and dyslexia activist.

== Biography ==
Augur was born on 24 March 1934 in Cannock, Staffordshire, England as Jean Florence Thomas. She was educated at Stafford Girls' High School and the City of Leicester Teacher Training College. In later life, she undertook a Master of Arts (MA) degree with the Roehampton Institute of Higher Education.

She began her career as a primary school teacher, but moved into remedial education after the struggles of her own sons with reading and writing and their subsequent dyslexia diagnoses. She championed the introduction of multisensory teaching into primary schools so that all children could benefit from the methods, and encouraged the teaching of dyslexic children within mainstream schools rather than segregated into remedial schools. She was headteacher of the Staines Dyslexia Institute Remedial Centre from 1982 to 1989, and then education officer of the British Dyslexia Association (BDA) from 1989 until her death: in the latter role, she also advised the British Government on education policy.

In 1956, she married Frank Augur (1933–2017). Together they had three sons.

Jean Augur died from breast cancer on 15 August 1993 in Esher, Surrey, England, aged 59.

== Selected works ==
- Augur, Jean (1981). This book doesn't make sens, cens, scens, sns [mis-spelling crossed through] sense: living and learning with dyslexia. London: Whurr Publishers. ISBN 9781897635131.
- Hickey, Kathleen (1992). Augur, Jean; Briggs, Suzanne (eds.). The Hickey multisensory language course (2nd ed.). London: Whurr. ISBN 9781870332521.
