= Walter Twigg =

English cricketer and field hockey player

Walter Hanbury Twigg (6 May 1883 – 5 February 1963) was an English field hockey player and cricketer.

Born at Weeping Cross, Staffordshire, Twigg was educated at Repton School, where he played for both the school cricket and football teams, before leaving Repton in July 1902 and attending King's College, London. In field hockey, Twigg played his club hockey for Stafford Hockey Club, and also appeared for England eight times in 1909 and 1910. As a cricketer, Twigg played minor counties cricket for Staffordshire, making his debut in the 1902 Minor Counties Championship against Bedfordshire at Stoke-on-Trent. He played minor counties cricket intermittently in the first decade of the 1900s, but played more frequently from 1911–1914. After the First World War he played in one final match against Berkshire in 1921, bringing his total appearances for Staffordshire in the Minor Counties Championship to 26.

He was by profession an electrical engineer. His membership of Stafford Hockey Club lasted over sixty years and he was its president for more than ten. He died at Stafford on 5 February 1963. His brother Charles was a first-class cricketer.
