= Littleworth, Stafford =

Area of Stafford, England

Coordinates: 52°48′30″N 02°06′00″W

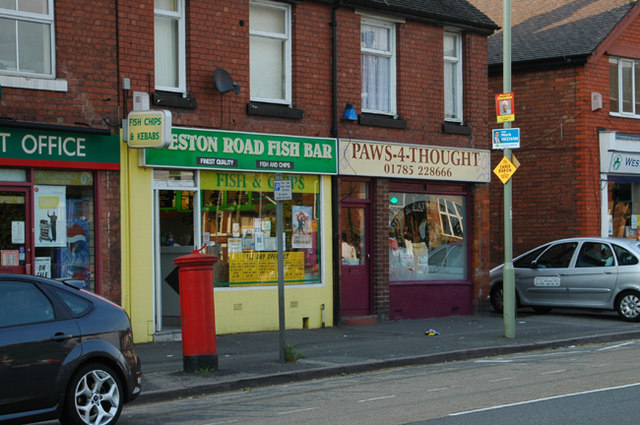
Local shops at Littleworth in 2009

Littleworth is a former village now forming part of the eastern end of the county town of Stafford in the English county of Staffordshire.

Littleworth is a relatively diverse area of Stafford, ranging from terraced former council-owned estates on its western side to more up-market housing on the eastern side and bookended at each end by a nature reserve. Running through the centre of Littleworth is Weston Road, which forms part of the main route between Stafford and Uttoxeter, while Tixall Road leads to Tixall, the Haywoods and Rugeley.

The town's major hospital, Stafford District General, lies within Littleworth, while the fire station and the University of Staffordshire lie just to the east of the boundary with Milford ward. The major source of employment in Littleworth is Perkins factory (formerly known as Dorman Diesels) which makes powerplants for marine and other applications, although many residents commute to Birmingham and Stoke-on-Trent.

Littleworth contains a post office, two public houses (The Metropolitan Bar and the Prince of Wales), one Indian and Nepalese restaurant (The Morris Man, a former pub), one bowling green, one Co-op, and one of the town's largest allotments.
