= Sarah Buck =

English structural and civil engineer and business woman (born 1953)

Sarah Buck OBE FIStructE
- Born: 3 January 1953 (age 73)
- Education: University of Exeter
- Children: 2
- Engineering career
- Discipline: Structural engineer
- Institutions: Fellow of the Institution of Structural Engineers, Member of the Institution of Civil Engineers
- Practice name: Now Retired

Sarah Buck (born 3 January 1953) is an English structural and civil engineer and business woman. From 2007–2009 she was the 88th President, and first female President, of the Institution of Structural Engineers.

== Education ==
Buck attended Stafford Girls High School and then went to study engineering at the University of Exeter in 1971, achieving a BSc with First Class Honours. She was the first pupil from Stafford Girls High School to go on to study engineering. Following her undergraduate degree she undertook a year of post graduate research in medical engineering in 1974.

== Career ==
Buck started her career at Freeman Fox & Partners in Exeter in 1975, followed by stints at Teignmouth District Council from 1976 to 1980; John Burrow and Partners (renamed DHV in 1991) from 1980 to 1993; and Bolgar Sykes White in Torquay from 1993 to 1996. She started her own business as a sole trader 1993, and then co-founded BSW Consulting in 1996 based in Exeter, where she has been a director for the past 11 years. She has been involved in the design and supervision of a wide range of civil and structural projects over her 30-year career, developing an interest in historic structures and sustainable construction.

Buck’s recent projects have included the new Children's Hospice near Bristol, a major study and remedial works at Mullion Harbour in Cornwall, a major refurbishment of a listed building and extensions to many schools. Other projects have included schools, flats, offices, leisure centres, hotels, banks, airports, drainage schemes and land fill sites. Whilst most of her work has been based around the UK’s South West, there have also been several overseas projects including Mmabtho Airport in Southern Africa, a new 15 km long sewerage scheme for Negril in Jamaica, and roads in Southern Africa.

== Wider industry involvement ==
Buck was elected as the first woman Council member of IStructE in 1983, and is a past chairman of the Devon and Cornwall branch of the IStructE. She was awarded IStructE’s Lewis Kent Award in 2001 which is awarded for personal services by a member to the Institution or the profession. She also played a key role in introducing the new membership grade of Technician (launched in February 2007) and the Institution’s first business plan. She was appointed President of IStructE on Thursday 4 October 2007 and was the first woman to be elected to this position. She also won a Civil Engineer Outstanding Achiever Award at the Atkins Inspire Awards in 2007.

Buck is also involved in the Education Sector as well as the wider construction industry. She is a Pro-Chancellor at Exeter university and a member of University Council (governing body). She is a member of the IStruct Joint Board of Moderators. She was a member of South West Women in Construction, who actively promote construction as a career for girls, and is a past member of the civil engineering advisory board of Exeter College, Exeter.

She was appointed Officer of the Order of the British Empire (OBE) in the 2015 New Year Honours for services to engineering and education.
