= Hixon, Staffordshire =

Village in Staffordshire, England

Coordinates: 52.8279°N 1.9999°W

Hixon
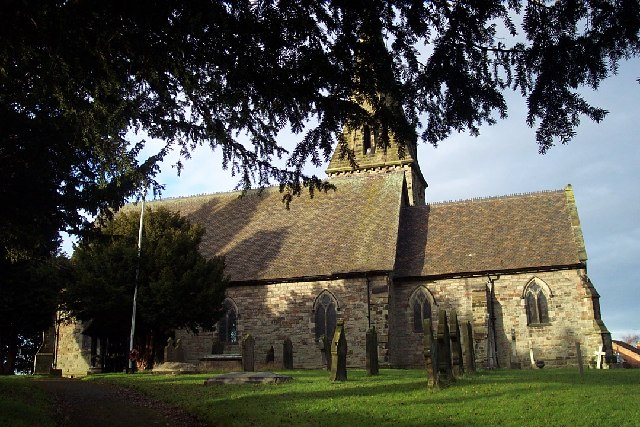
- The Parish Church of Saint Peter

- Location within Staffordshire
- Population: 1,917 (2011)
  - London: 136
- District: Stafford
- Shire county: Staffordshire
- Region: West Midlands
- Country: England
- Sovereign state: United Kingdom
- Post town: STAFFORD
- Postcode district: ST18
- Dialling code: 01889
- Police: Staffordshire
- Fire: Staffordshire
- Ambulance: West Midlands
- UK Parliament: Stone, Great Wyrley and Penkridge

Hixon is a village and a civil parish in the English county of Staffordshire.
grid reference SK003259

== Location ==
The village is 7.8 miles (12.6 km) east of the town of Stafford, 9.9 miles (15.9 km) southeast of the town of Stone, 6.4 miles (10.3 km) northwest of the town of Rugeley and 8.6 miles (13.8 km) south west of Uttoxeter. The nearest railway station is at Rugeley. The nearest main roads are the A518 which skirts 1.3 miles (2.1 km) north of the village, and the A51 which runs to the west.

== History ==
=== Etymology ===
The genesis of the village name is said to be of Scandinavian origin. The first part, Hus is thought to be the Viking word for house. The last part Dun is an old English word for Hill, so giving the origins as The House on the Hill. Another school of thought originates the name from a person known as Hyht with the following es indicating it in the possession and can be interpreted as Hyht's hill. Over the years the village has been recorded under the names Huchtesdona in 1130, Huhtesdon and Huytesdon.

=== The Domesday Book ===
Hixon is listed in the Domesday Book of 1086. In the survey the village has the name Hustedone. and was described as being very small with five households. The village assets included two ploughs, a meadow and 3 acres. The head of the manor was Haywood. In 1066 the lord of the manor was the Bishop of Chester. In 1086 the lord of the manor was Nigel of Stafford and the Bishop of Chester was now the tenant-in-chief. The survey also states that the value of the parish was 10s 9d.

=== RAF Hixon ===
During the Second World War, Hixon was the location of a Royal Air Force Station built for RAF Bomber Command. The station opened in 1942 on a site located 0.9 miles (1.4 km) north west of the village and had the station identification code of HX. Three intersecting concrete runways were built on the station, which were surfaced with tarmac for use by Class-A bombers. The station building and technical site were located on the south east of the station and included accommodation and communal facilities for 2,938 RAF personnel. There were also four T-2 type hangars and one MAP B-1 aircraft hangar. Overseeing the station was a 1941 pattern control tower which still survives and is currently being used as industrial offices. During the war bomber aircraft that used the airfield included Vickers Wellingtons, Avro Lancasters and Bristol Blenheims. Other types that operated from the station included Curtiss P40 Tomahawks, Miles M.9 Masters, Miles M.25 Martinets and Hawker Hurricanes which were mainly used for training.

=== Hixon rail crash ===
On 6 January 1968 a 120-ton transformer was being moved from the English Electric factory at Stafford to storage on the disused airfield at Hixon. The road train grounded on the level crossing in New Road (aka Station Road), Hixon. An express train from Manchester London Road to Euston ran into the transformer. Eleven people were killed and twenty seven seriously injured. Following this accident the requirements for telephones at automatic crossings were increased greatly and their position and signage improved. The level crossing was eventually replaced by a bridge in 2002 following the tragic death of local man Tony Heasman whose vehicle was struck on the crossing.

== Public houses ==
The village has only one public house as of 2020, The Bank House, since the demolition of the former Green Man in September 2020 The Bankhouse Inn used to have a butchers and brew house attached. This pub has been extended and now includes a seating area for meals however the bar and lounge are still very old with timbers and open fires.

The Green Man was used for many public events such as the annual fireworks that raise money for the Charity for Hixons Elderly Folk (CHEF) and CHEF fest which are very well supported. The Green Man closed in November 2019 having been sold to a private developer, with planning permission granted for a mix of residential and commercial property. This was despite the best efforts of the local community who presented viable options to the owner at the time Steve Rabjons.

== Organisations ==
Hixon Community Association (HCA) is an umbrella group that collaborates with many smaller groups and organisations. Its main focus is to help pool resources and work with other groups to achieve their goals.

HCA has shared interests with the following groups:

- St Peters PTFA
- Wellington Fields Allotments Association
- Hixon Memorial Hall
- Hixon Green and Clean
- Friends of Hixon
- The Charity for Hixon Elderly Folk (CHEF)
- Millennium Green Trust

CHEF continues to raise money through CHEF Fest music festival. CHEF Fest is an annual festival helping to raise money for the old folks Christmas Party. Following the demolition of the Green Man public house, the music festival has relocated to the Millennium Green in Hixon.

== The Parish Church of Saint Peter ==
The 19th century parish church of Saint Peter is a Grade II listed building, in the Early English Gothic style. and was designed and built by the English Gothic Revival architect George Gilbert Scott.

The site for the church was given by Lord Talbot and had previously been occupied by a windmill: this gives the church an unusual location on high ground, away from the road, on the edge of the village. The foundation stone was laid by the Marchioness of Lothian in July 1846. The Church was consecrated on St. Peter's Day 1848 (Tuesday, 29 June) by the then Bishop of Lichfield, John Lonsdale.

The church is part of the combined Mid-Trent Churches benefice of the Diocese of Lichfield, covering ten churches across eight parishes.

Adjacent to the church stands the old St.Peters school and the St.peters school house. Originally home to the Headmaster and Headmistress and their family. Mr. & Mrs. Harrison. ( 1960's )

== Transport ==
=== Hixon Halt and the railway ===
The village was connected to the rail network when the North Staffordshire Railway was routed through the area along the Trent Valley. The station was called Hixon Halt and it was opened in 1847 two years after the railway line had first been opened in 1845. Hixon Halt was located half a mile south of the village but was closed for passengers in 1947.

=== Bus services ===
Chaserider run one main bus service to Stafford and Uttoxeter which use 5 different stops in the village with the main two being on Martins Way and Back Lane opposite the Bankhouse Inn. D&G Bus operate service X41 to Drayton Manor theme park during the summer which passes through the village.

D&G formerly operated 842 to Great Haywood and Rugeley but this was withdrawn due to County Council funding.

== People of note ==
=== People of note ===
- Wilmot Martin, MBE, (1875-1963), a farmer, charitable fundraiser and entertainer who performed under the name 'The Staffordshire Harry Lauder'. Buried in St Peter's Church, Hixon.

== See also ==
- Listed buildings in Hixon, Staffordshire
