= Stafford =

County town of Staffordshire, England

Coordinates: 52.807°N 2.117°W

- Town
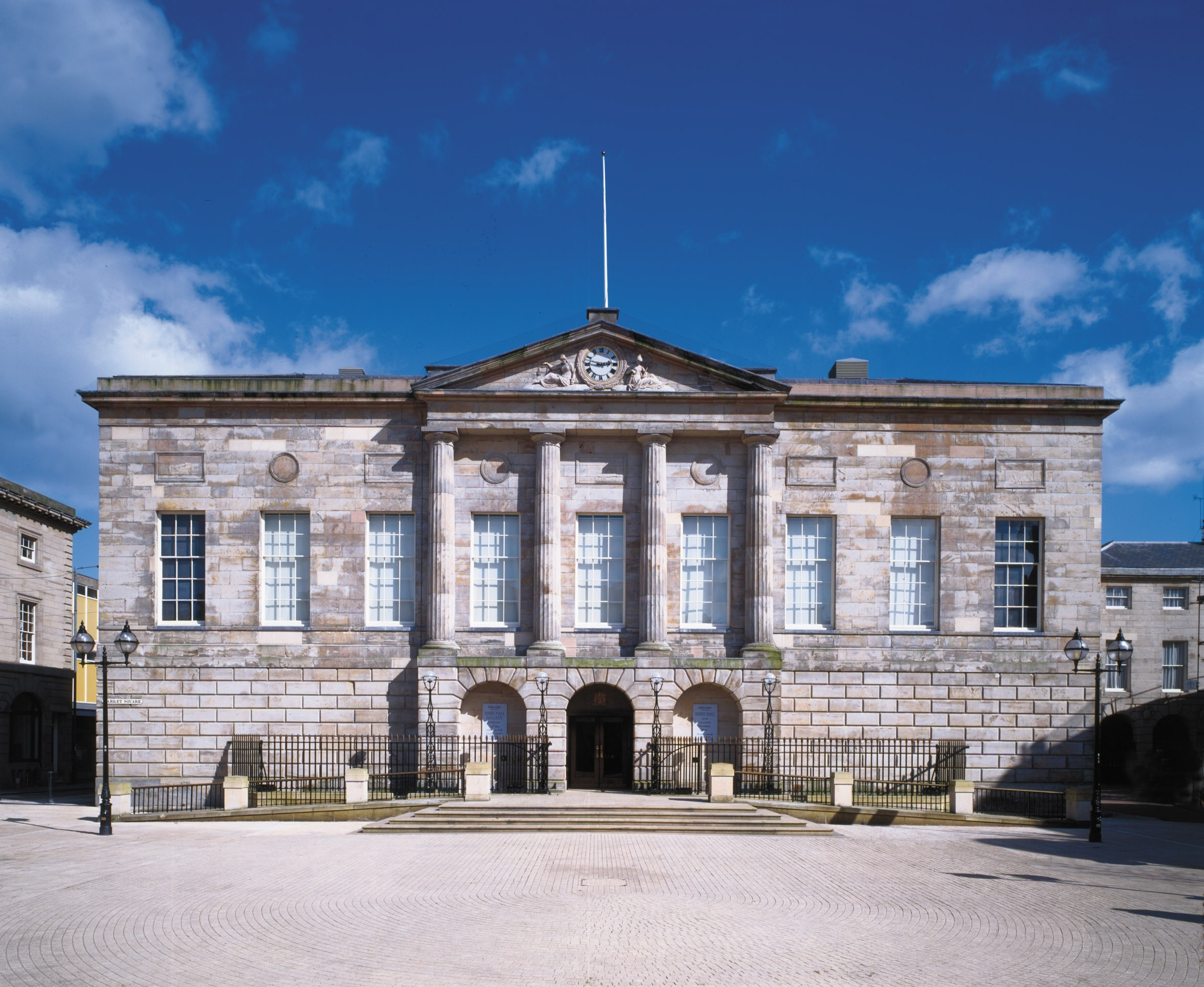
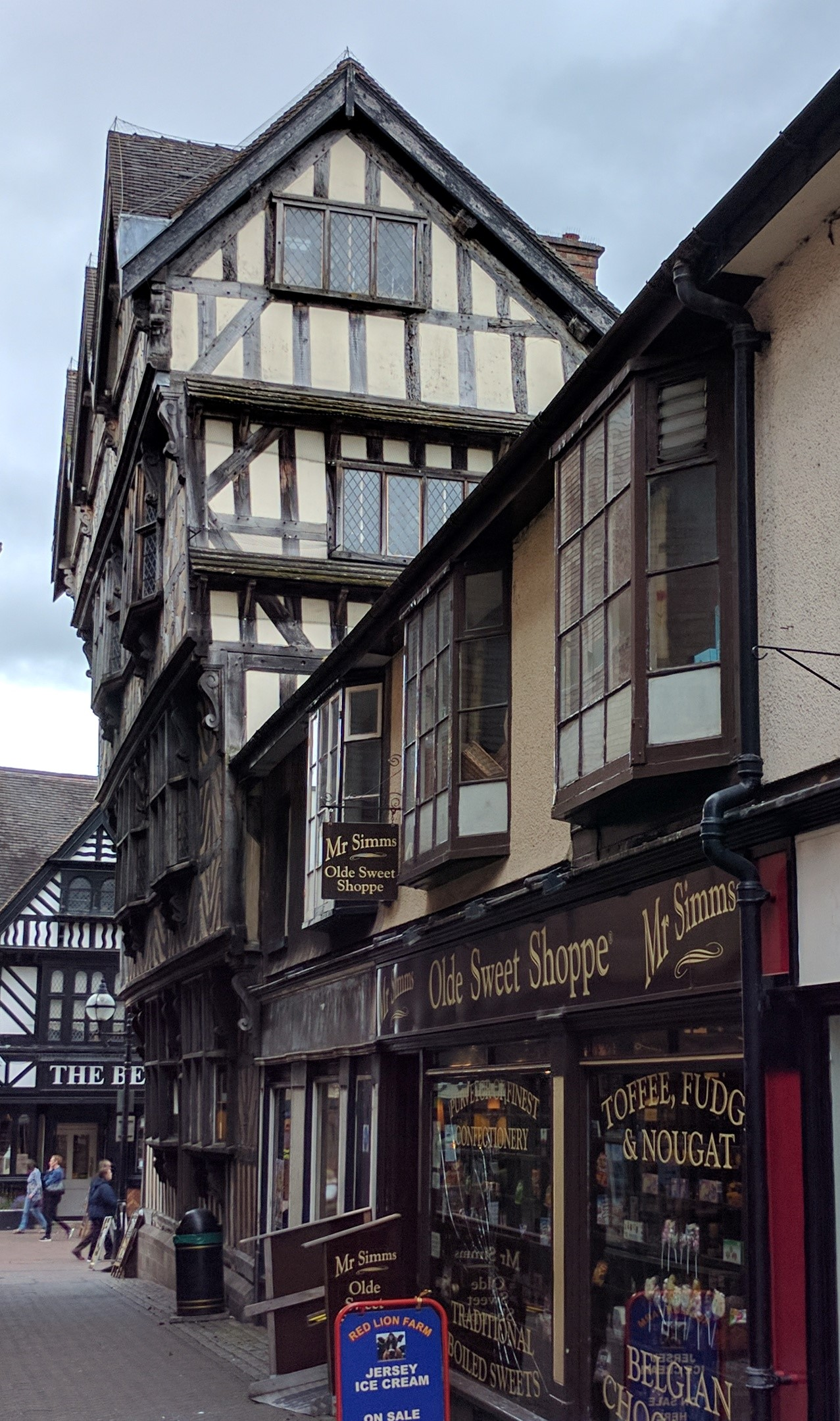
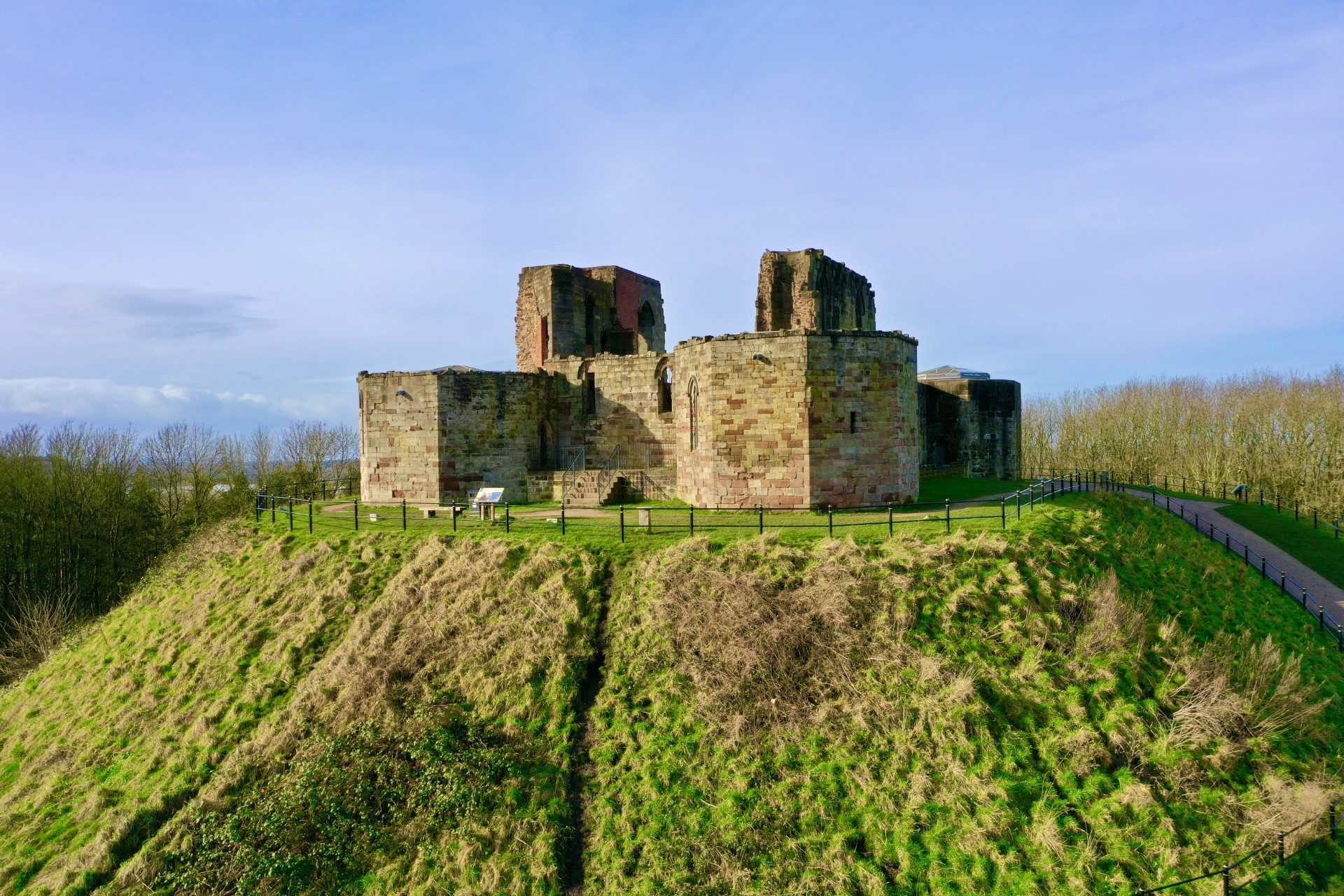
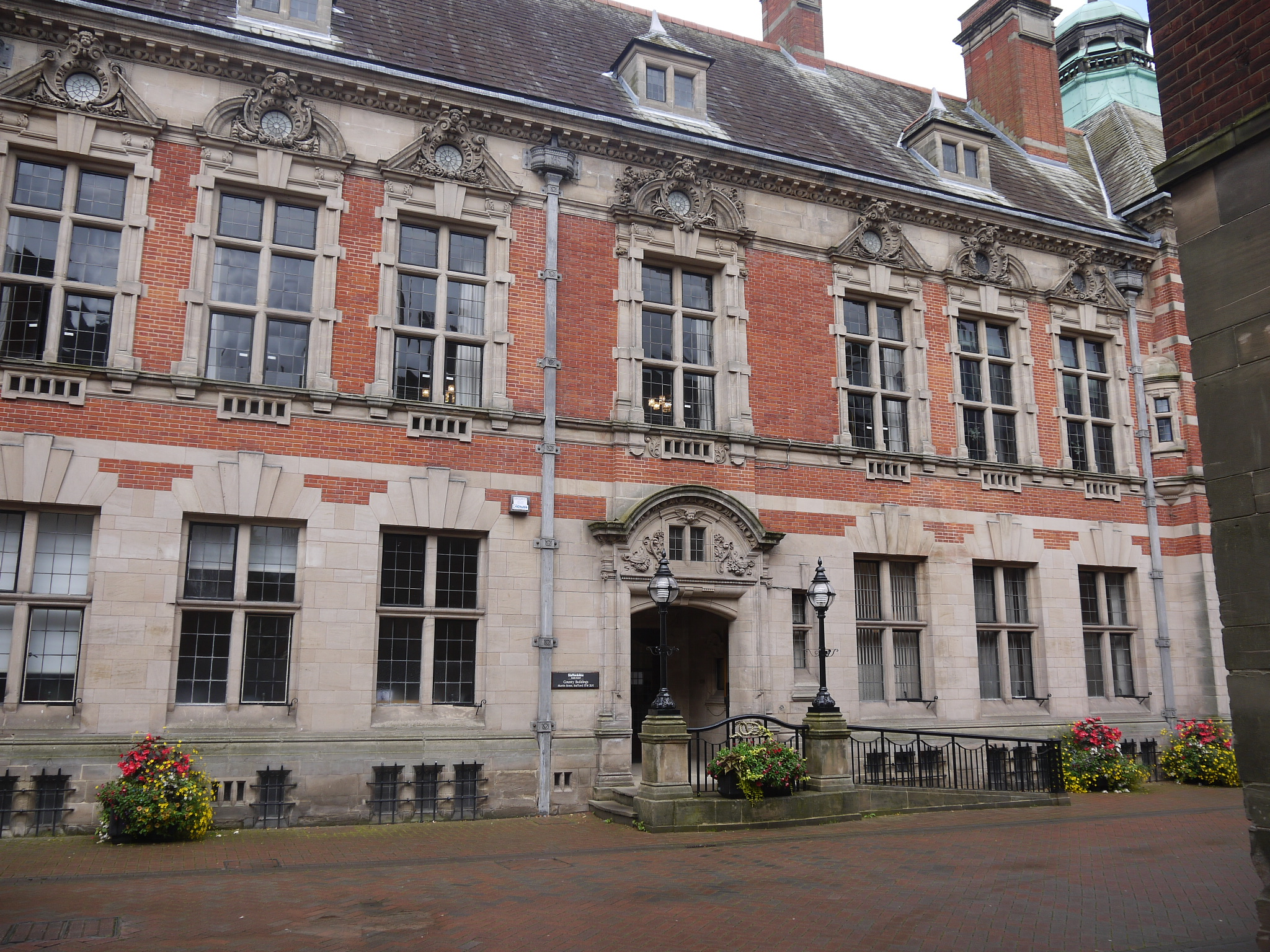
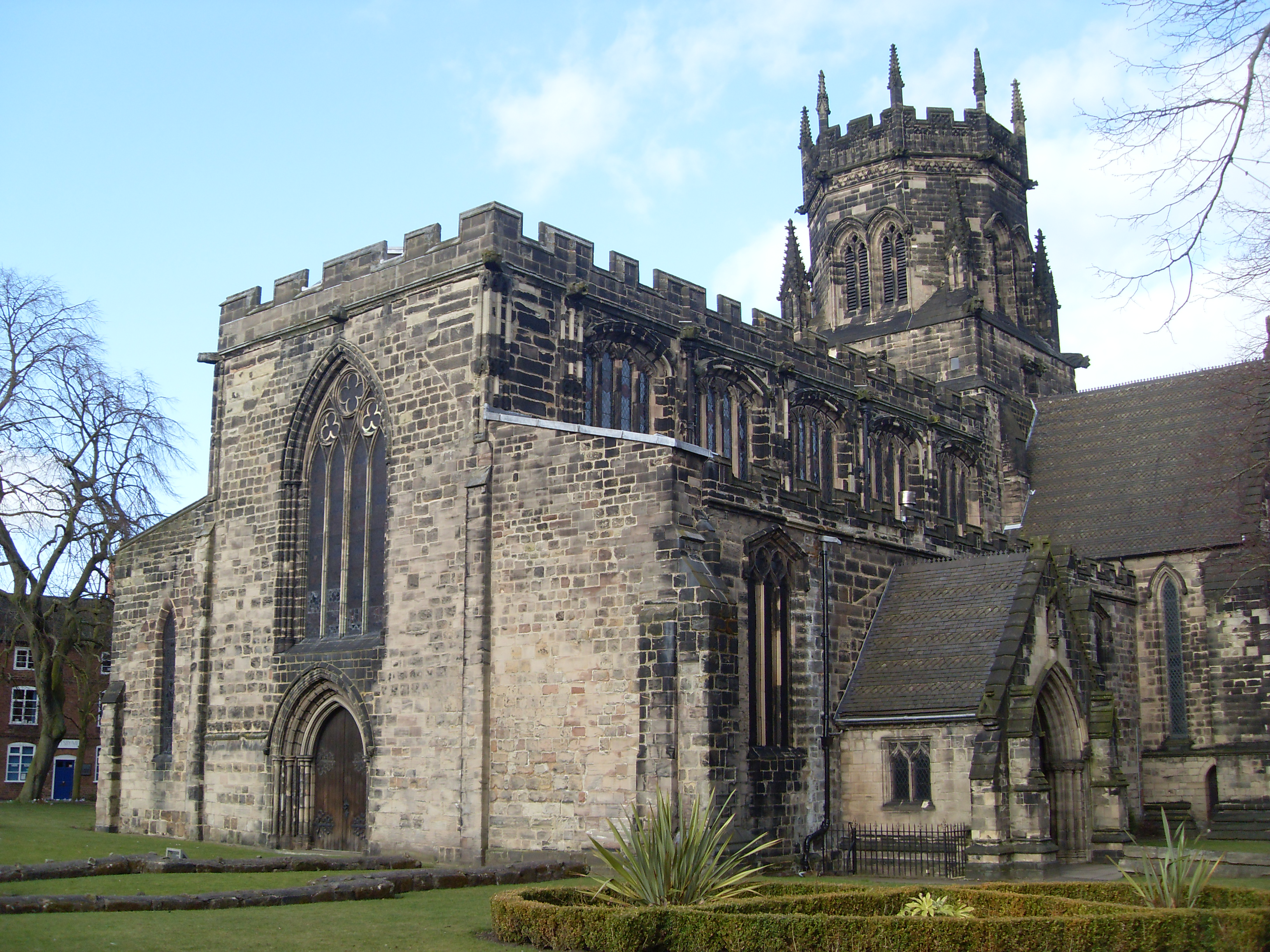
- Shire Hall High House Castle County Buildings St Mary's Church

- Location within Staffordshire
- Population: 71,673 (2021 census)
- OS grid reference: SJ922232
- District: Stafford
- Shire county: Staffordshire
- Region: West Midlands
- Country: England
- Sovereign state: United Kingdom
- Suburbs of the town: List: Baswich; Beaconside; Coppenhall; Doxey; Holmcroft; Hyde Lea; Littleworth; Moss Pit; Tillington; Walton on the Hill
- Post town: Stafford
- Postcode district: ST16-ST21
- Dialling code: 01785
- Police: Staffordshire
- Fire: Staffordshire
- Ambulance: West Midlands
- UK Parliament: Stafford
- Website: staffordbc.gov.uk

Stafford (/ˈstæfərd/) is a market town and the county town of Staffordshire, England. It is located about 15 miles (24 km) south of Stoke-on-Trent, 15 miles (24 km) north of Wolverhampton and 24 miles (39 km) north-west of Birmingham. The town had a population of 71,673 at the 2021 census, and is the main settlement within the larger Borough of Stafford, which had a population of 136,837 in 2021.

Stafford has Anglo-Saxon roots, being founded in 913, when Æthelflæd, Lady of the Mercians, founded a defensive burh; it became the county town of Staffordshire soon after. Stafford became an important market town in the Middle Ages and later grew into an important industrial town, due to the proliferation of shoemaking, engineering and electrical industries.

== History ==
=== Ancient ===
Prehistoric finds suggest scattered settlements in the area, whilst 2.5 miles (4.0 km) south-west of the town lies an Iron Age hill fort at Berry Ring. There is also evidence of Roman activity in the area, with finds around Clark and Eastgate Street. However it is thought that the Romans reclaimed the marsh for agriculture rather than settlement.

=== Anglo-Saxon ===
Stafford means "ford" by a staithe (landing place). The original settlement was on a near island, on a gravelly lowland bounded by loop of the River Sow to the south and west (a tributary of the River Trent). The eastern boundary was formed by Sandyford brook, with a marshy area to the north. Despite many drains being constructed in the 19th century, the area is still prone to flooding.

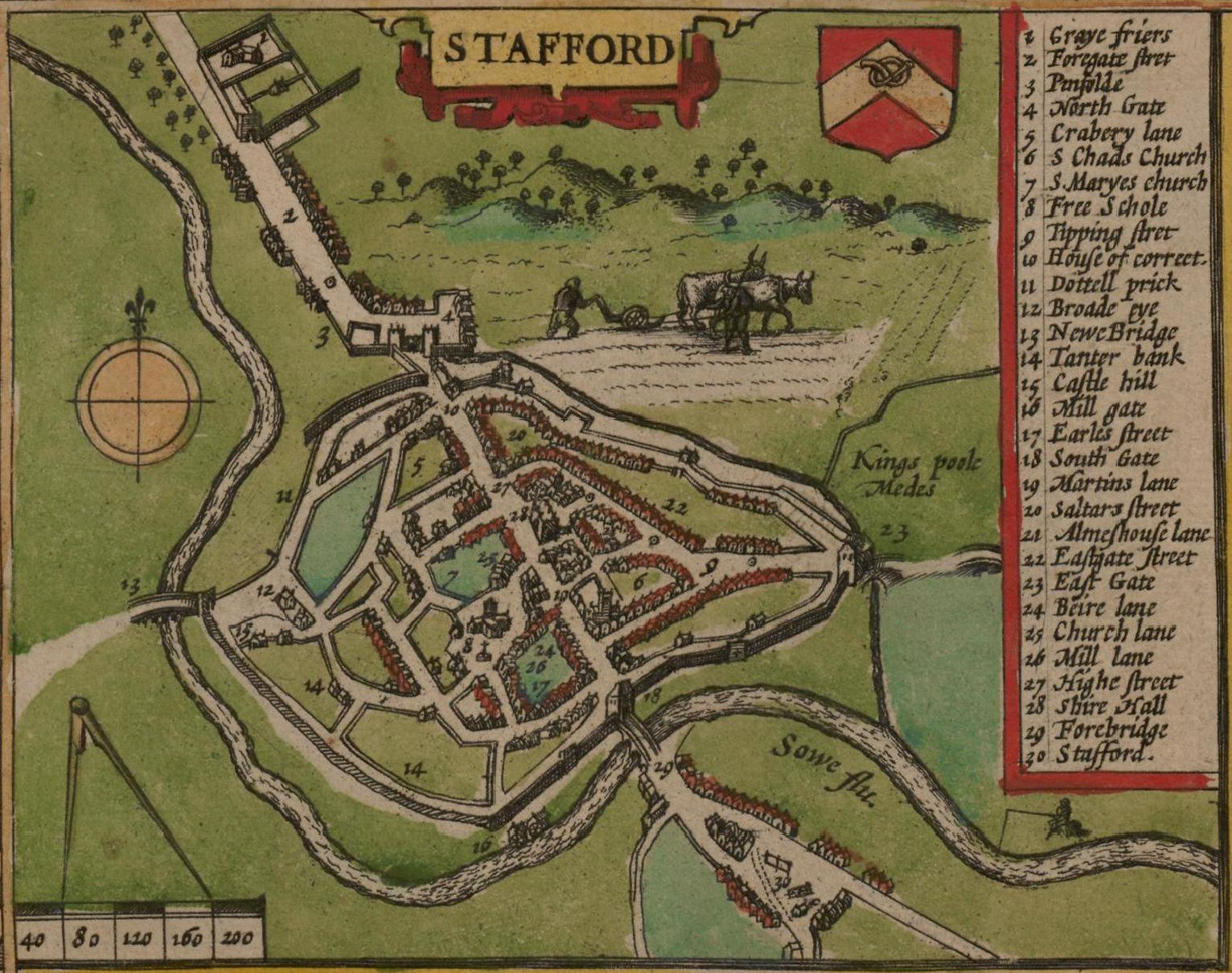
Map of Stafford by John Speed circa 1611

Stafford has been identified as the island of Bethney, or Bethnei where St Bertelin is said to have founded a hermitage about AD 700, before moving to a more remote area.

Others then settled in the area and named it Stafford. There may have been a settlement near the river crossing in 913, when Æthelflæd, Lady of Mercia founded a burh (fortified settlement) at Stafford; one of many founded across Mercia as part of her campaign against the Danes (Vikings). A mint was founded at Stafford by King Æthelstan (924-39) which continued in operation until the reign of Henry II (1154–89). Stafford also provided an industrial area for centralised production of Roman-style pottery (Stafford Ware), which was supplied to a chain of West Midlands burhs.

The county of Staffordshire was formed at about this time, with Stafford as its county town. Stafford lay within the Pirehill hundred.

=== Norman and medieval ===
In the autumn of 1069, a rebellion led by Eadric the Wild against the Norman Conquest culminated in the Battle of Stafford, during which the Anglo-Welsh rebel army was decisively defeated by Norman forces led by Brian of Brittany and William I. Two years later another rebellion, led by Edwin, Earl of Mercia, ended in Edwin's assassination and distribution of his lands among the followers of William the Conqueror, who granted Robert de Tosny (later known as Robert de Stafford) the manor of Bradley and one third of the king's rents in Stafford. The estate became the seat of the powerful Stafford family.

Following the Battle of Stafford, and the subsequent Harrying of the North, Stafford underwent an extensive period of depopulation and urban decay. Archaeological evidence has revealed that much of the town had been abandoned following the battle, and when the Doomsday Book was completed in 1086, seventeen years after the battle, the town was declared to still be "partially waste" with almost a third of the messuages uninhabited.

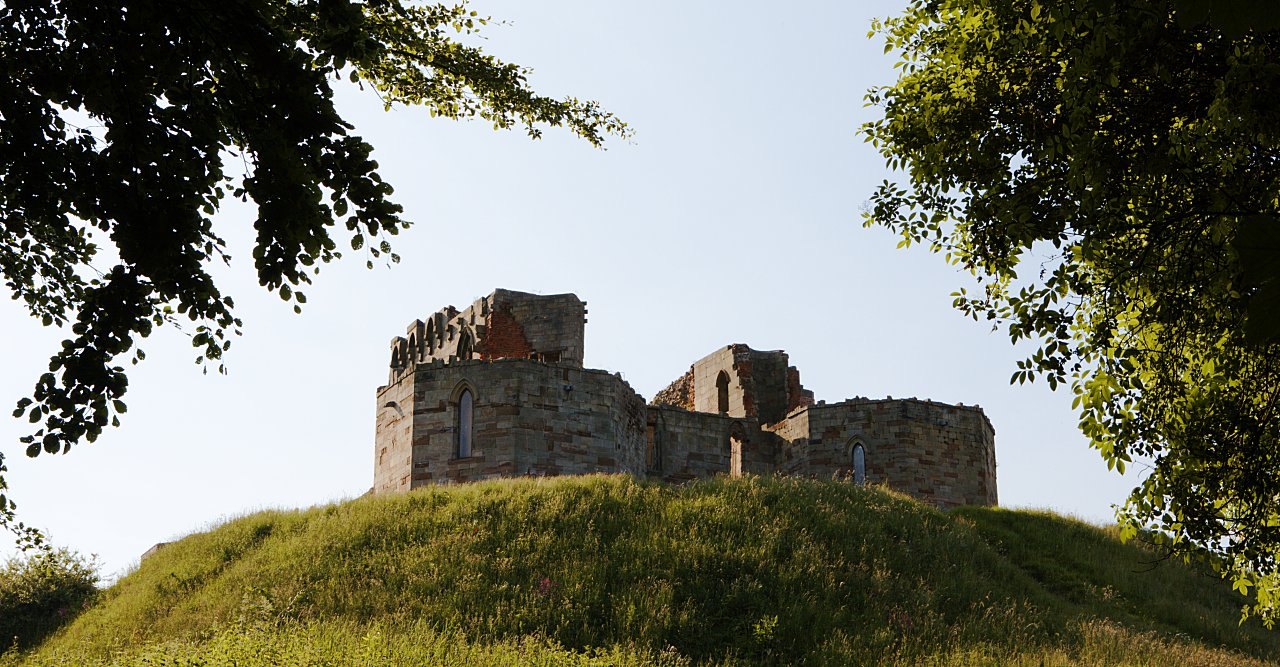
Stafford Castle

Stafford Castle, was first built by Robert de Stafford on a nearby hilltop to the west in the wake of the Norman Invasion, where the motte, moat and baily remain visible to this day. It was first made of wood and later rebuilt in stone around 1348. It has been rebuilt since. A wooden castle had been built in 1070 much closer to the town centre, however this had fallen into ruin by the recording of the Doomsday Book and its precise location remains unknown.

Stafford was a walled town by 1086. The town walls were probably wooden originally, but later rebuilt in stone. There were four gates on the roads into the town from the north, south, east and west. By around 1670 the walls were in ruin, and their remnants were gradually demolished.

Stafford became an important market town during the Middle Ages, which had a particular focus of trading cloth and wool. By the 1280s there were various trades such as tanning, glove making and shoe making being practised in the town. A guild of shoemakers was founded in 1476.

Medieval Stafford was served by two churches: St Chad's, which is the oldest building in Stafford, dating from the mid-12th century, and St Mary's which dates from the early-13th century.

King Richard II was paraded through the town's streets as a prisoner in 1399, by troops loyal to Henry Bolingbroke (the future Henry IV).

=== Tudor ===
In 1521, Stafford was described as 'a proper and fair town', although it went into decline during the Tudor period, and in 1540, many of the houses were described as being in a state of disrepair. Elizabeth I visited Stafford in 1575, at this time the town was still in a state of decay.

The Ancient High House, believed to be the largest timber-framed town house in England, was built in 1595 for John Dorrington; it was extensively restored during 1976-86.

=== 17th century ===
When James I visited Stafford in 1617, he was said to be so impressed by the Shire Hall and other buildings that he called it "Little London".

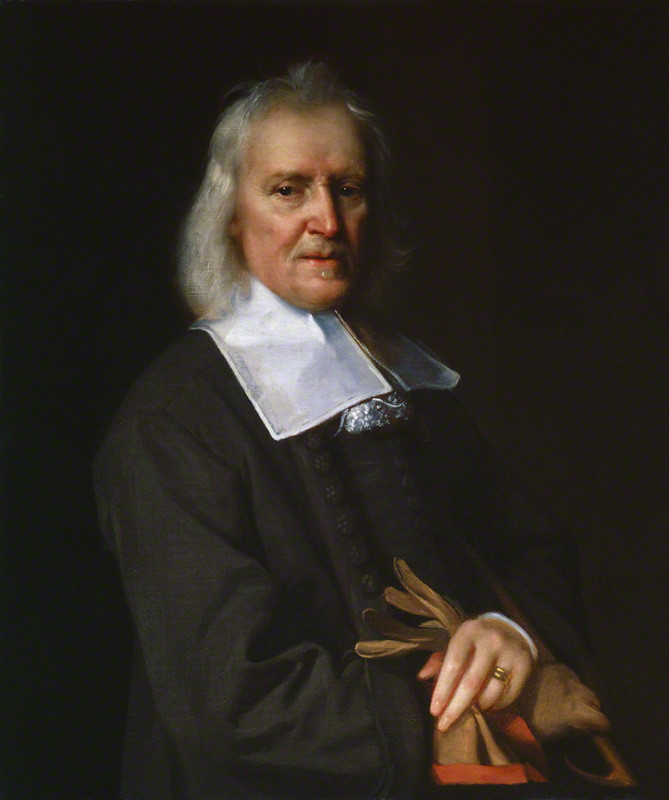
The author Izaak Walton was born in Stafford. Portrait by Jacob Huysmans

During the English Civil War, Stafford was initially held by the Royalists; King Charles I visited Stafford shortly after the outbreak of the war in September 1642, staying for three days at the Ancient High House. The town resisted two assaults by the Parliamentarians in February 1643, but was later taken by them in May 1643, when a force led by Sir William Brereton captured the town by stealth. Stafford then became the seat of the parliamentary county committee. Stafford Castle was defended by a garrison led by Lady Isabel Stafford, but the Parliamentarians finally won control in 1643. A few months later an order was given for the demolition of the castle. However, Stafford's famous son Izaak Walton, author of The Compleat Angler, was a staunch Royalist.

In 1658, Stafford elected John Bradshaw, who had been judge at the trial of King Charles I, to represent the town in Parliament. During the reign of Charles II, William Howard, 1st Viscount Stafford became implicated in the Popish Plot, in which Titus Oates whipped up anti-Catholic feeling with claims of a plot to have the king killed. Lord Stafford was among those accused; he was unfortunate to be the first to be tried and was beheaded in 1680. The charge was false and on 4 June 1685, the bill of attainder against him was reversed.

=== 18th century to present ===
The town was represented in Parliament from 1780 by the playwright Richard Brinsley Sheridan. During that period, the town's mechanised shoe industry was founded, the best-known factory owner being William Horton. The shoemaking industry flourished over the next century, and became Stafford's staple trade, at its height in the 1880s, there were 39 manufacturers in the town. The industry went into steady decline from thereon, and by 1958 there was just one manufacturer, Lotus remaining. The last shoe factory was demolished in 1998.

In 1814, Stafford was linked to the canal network by the River Sow Navigation; a short navigation which linked Stafford to the Staffordshire and Worcestershire Canal. The navigation fell into disuse in the 1930s.

The railways arrived in Stafford in 1837 when the Grand Junction Railway was opened, linking the Liverpool and Manchester Railway to Birmingham, which provided the first rail connection to London. The Trent Valley Railway to Rugby and then direct to London, was opened in 1847. Two more lines, both now closed then followed, from Stafford to Shrewsbury in 1849, and to Uttoxeter in 1867. Stafford became a major junction, which helped to attract other industries.

In the late 19th century, Stafford's economy began to diversify into engineering, when the locomotive manufacturer W. G. Bagnall opened a large works in the town in 1875. In the early 1900s electrical engineering became a major activity, when Siemens Brothers, opened a large factory in the town, producing such items as electrical motors, generators and transformers. The electrical industry has been under the ownership of several companies since, including English Electric and GEC.

The Friars' Walk drill hall was completed in 1913, just in time for the First World War.

The M6 motorway was opened to the west of Stafford in 1962.

In 2013, Stafford celebrated its 1,100th anniversary year with a number of history-based exhibitions, while local historian Nick Thomas and writer Roger Butters were set to produce the two-volume A Compleat [sic] History of Stafford.

=== Civic history ===
Stafford was already an ancient borough by the time of the Domesday Book of 1086. Its borough status was confirmed in 1206, when King John issued a charter. Stafford was reconstituted as a municipal borough in 1835. The borough boundaries were expanded in 1876, 1917 and 1934.

The modern Borough of Stafford covers a much larger area then the town itself, and was created in 1974, when the old municipal borough of Stafford was merged with the Stafford Rural District, the Stone Rural District and the Stone Urban District.

Under current local government reorganisation plans, all district councils in Staffordshire, as well as the county council, will be abolished in 2028, with the borough of Stafford being abolshed and merged into a new South and Mid Staffordshire unitary authority. Stafford is currently an unparished area. In 2026 a consultation took place as to whether a civil parish should be established for the town to allow it to have a town (parish) council, which would allow for the tradition of the mayoralty to be continued.

=== Historic population ===
| Year | 1622 | 1801 | 1831 | 1861 | 1881 | 1911 | 1951 | 1971 | 2001 | 2021 |
|---|---|---|---|---|---|---|---|---|---|---|
| Population* | 1,550 | 3,898 | 6,956 | 12,532 | 19,977 | 23,383 | 40,263 | 55,001 | 62,789 | 71,673 |

== Landmarks ==
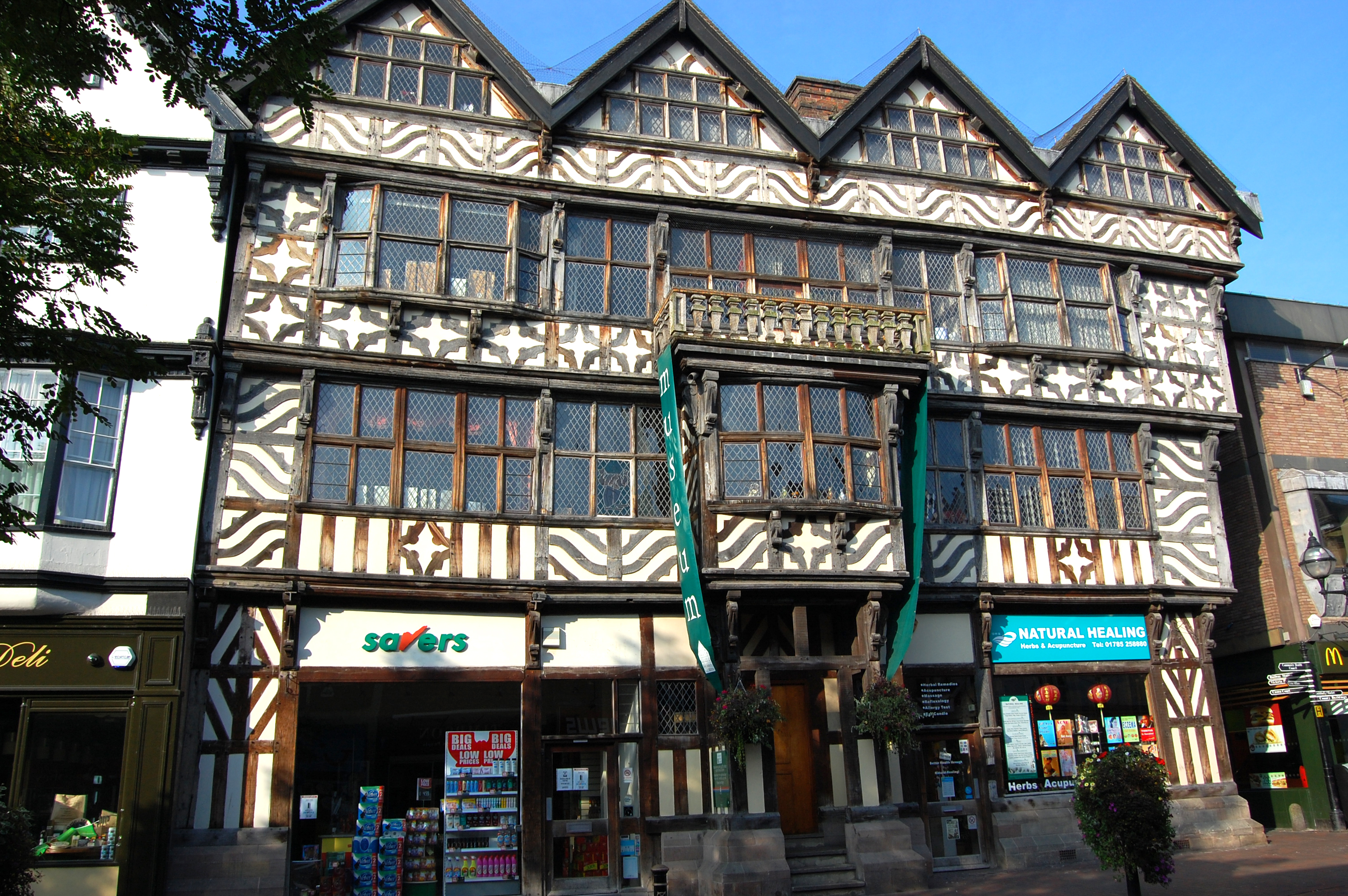
Ancient High House

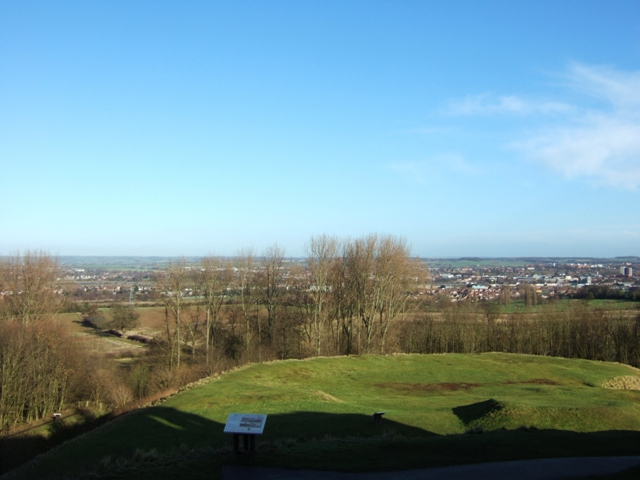
View from Stafford Castle

The Elizabethan Ancient High House in the town centre is the largest timber-framed town house in England. It is now a museum with temporary exhibitions.

Stafford Castle was built by the Normans on the nearby hilltop to the west in about 1090, replacing the post-Conquest fort in the town. It was first made of wood, and later rebuilt of stone. It has been rebuilt twice since, and the ruins of the 19th-century Gothic revival castle crowning the earthworks incorporate much of the original stonework. The castle has a visitor centre with audio-visual displays and hands-on items. There is also a recreated medieval herb garden. Shakespeare productions take place in the castle grounds each summer. The castle forms a landmark for drivers, as it is visible from the M6 motorway.

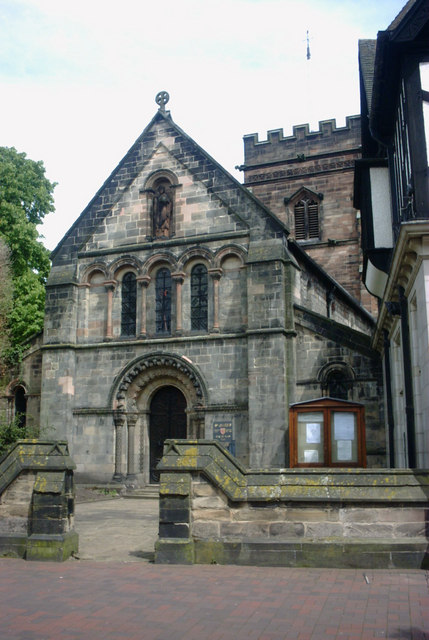
St Chad's Church, Stafford

The oldest building now in Stafford is St Chad's Church, dating back to the 12th century. The main part of the church is richly decorated. Carvings in its archways and on its pillars may have been made by a group of stonemasons from the Middle East who came to England during the Crusades. Much of the stonework was covered up in the 17th and 18th centuries and the church took on a neo-classical style. In the early 19th-century restoration, work was carried out on the church and the Norman decoration rediscovered. The church hosts "Timewalk", a computer-generated display that relates the journey of history and mystery within the walls of the church.

St Mary's, the collegiate church formerly linked to St Bertelin's chapel, was rebuilt in the early 13th century on a cruciform plan, with an aisled nave and chancel typical of the period. It has an impressive octagonal tower, once topped by a tall steeple, which can be picked out in Gough's plan shown above. The church was effectively two churches in one, divided by a screen, with the parish using the nave and the collegiate canons the chancel. St Mary's was restored in 1842 by Giles Gilbert Scott.

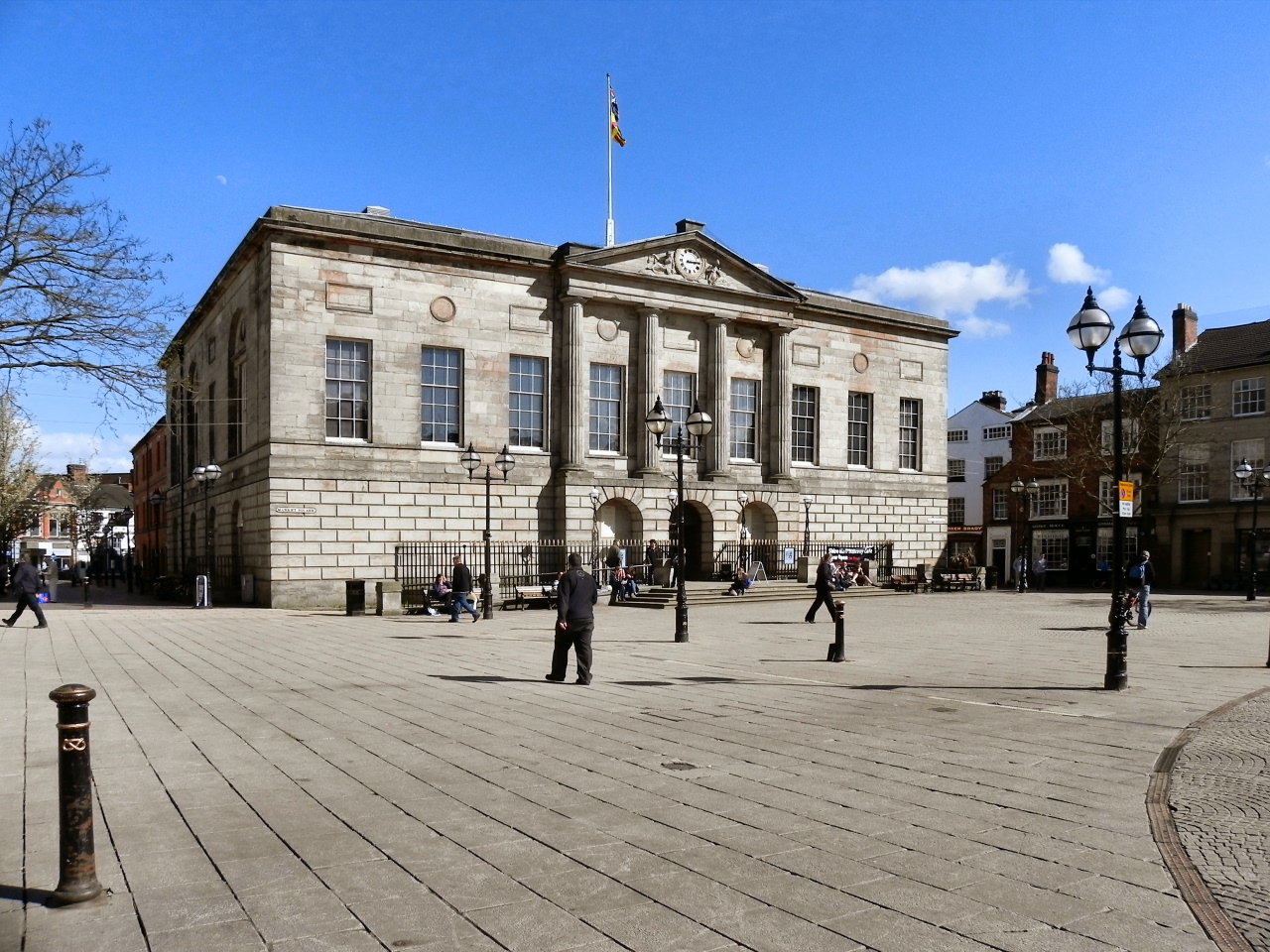
Shire Hall and Market Square

The Shire Hall was built in 1798 as a court house and office of the Mayor and Clerk of Stafford. The Shire Hall used to be the town's court house, and is a Grade II listed building. In recent times, the building was used as an art gallery and library, before a new facility was built within the new council buildings, The Market Square has recently gone under a £2 million redevelopment which was completed in November 2023.

Green Hall on Lichfield Road is a Grade II listed manor house (now apartments), originally built about 1810 as Forebridge Hall, known after 1880 as Green Hall. It was previously used as a girls' school and as council offices.

The Shugborough Hall country estate is 4 miles (6.4 km) out of town. It once belonged to the Earls of Lichfield and is now owned by the National Trust. The 19th-century Sandon Hall is 5 miles (8.0 km) north-east of Stafford. It is set in 400 acres (1.6 km^{2}) of parkland, as the seat of the Earl of Harrowby. Weston Hall stands 5 miles (8.0 km) east of Stafford, in the Trent valley with a large park and was once part of the Chartley estate. It is thought that the main part of the hall was built about 1550 as a small dower house, but the architectural evidence suggests it is Jacobean. Weston Hall was extended in 1660 into a three-gabled structure with high-pitched roofs.

== Culture ==
Stafford Gatehouse Theatre is the town's main entertainment and cultural venue. Its Met Studio is a dedicated to stand-up comedy and alternative live music. There is an art gallery in the Shire Hall.

Victoria Park hosts the annual LGBTQ+ Pride Festival started in 2024 by 2 local business owners attracting over 8000 people throughout the town centre during the festival.

Staffordshire County Showground, just outside the town, holds many national and local events. The annual Shakespeare Festival at Stafford Castle has attracted many notable people, including Frank Sidebottom and Ann Widdecombe.

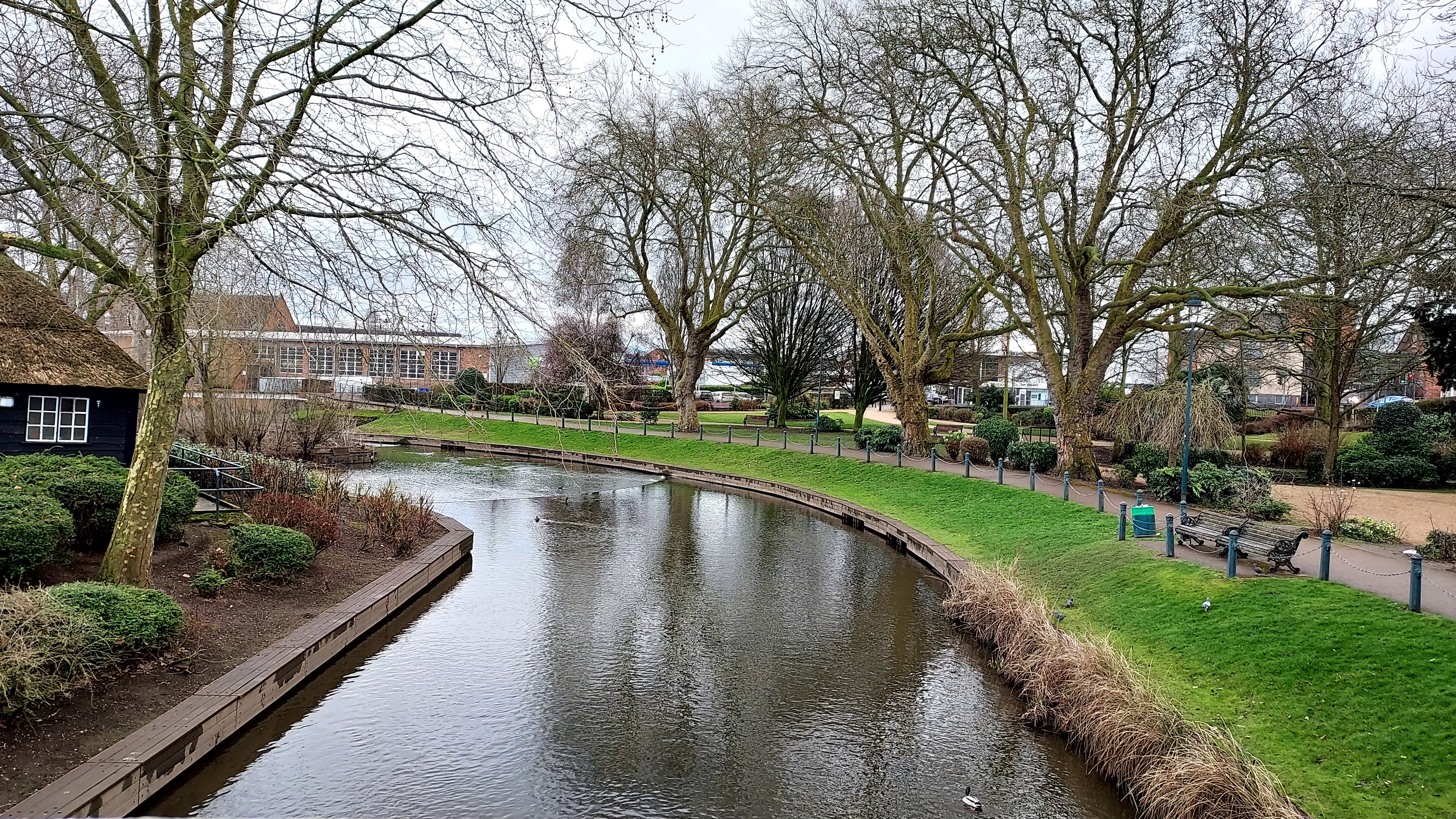
Victoria Park, Stafford

Victoria Park, opened in 1908, is a 13-acre (53 ha) Edwardian riverside park with a play park, bowling green, bird cages and greenhouses. It has a children's play area, a sand-and-water-jet area replacing an open-air paddling pool, and a bmx/skateboard area. Stafford also has a 9-hole golf course near the town centre.

Recent developments on Riverside allowed for an expansion of the town, notably with a new Odeon cinema to replace the ageing one at the end of the high street. Stafford Film Theatre is based at the Gatehouse Theatre and shows independent and alternative films. There is a tenpin bowling alley at Greyfriars Place. The new Stafford Leisure Centre opened in 2008 on Lammascote Road.

Night life consists of smaller bar and club venues such as RIVA, Casa, the Grapes, the Picture House, neighbouring venues such as Top of The World, Hogarths, and rock gigs at the live music venue Redrum. Most of these are in walking distance of each other. There was previously a big student patronage, with coaches bringing them from Stoke-on-Trent, Cannock and Wolverhampton.

A new shopping centre was completed in 2017, housing major stores and a number of restaurants. The Guildhall shopping centre no longer is open and has been demolished awaiting redevelopment from Stafford Borough Council. Currently there is only a jewelers and party / music shop left near the entrance.

== Climate ==
Like most of the British Isles, Stafford has an oceanic climate which is a sub zone of temperate climates with cool summers and mild winters. The nearest Met Office weather station is at Penkridge, about 5 miles to the south.

Climate data for Stafford 101 m asl, 1991–2020
| Month | Jan | Feb | Mar | Apr | May | Jun | Jul | Aug | Sep | Oct | Nov | Dec | Year |
|---|---|---|---|---|---|---|---|---|---|---|---|---|---|
| Mean daily maximum °C (°F) | 7.29 (45.12) | 8.06 (46.51) | 10.51 (50.92) | 13.53 (56.35) | 16.60 (61.88) | 19.45 (67.01) | 21.77 (71.19) | 21.27 (70.29) | 18.57 (65.43) | 14.45 (58.01) | 10.44 (50.79) | 7.66 (45.79) | 14.16 (57.49) |
| Mean daily minimum °C (°F) | 1.83 (35.29) | 1.83 (35.29) | 3.10 (37.58) | 4.56 (40.21) | 7.20 (44.96) | 9.98 (49.96) | 11.97 (53.55) | 11.79 (53.22) | 9.87 (49.77) | 7.28 (45.10) | 4.32 (39.78) | 2.01 (35.62) | 6.34 (43.41) |
| Average precipitation mm (inches) | 56.69 (2.23) | 43.05 (1.69) | 42.50 (1.67) | 48.78 (1.92) | 55.47 (2.18) | 61.43 (2.42) | 61.01 (2.40) | 60.12 (2.37) | 61.53 (2.42) | 67.48 (2.66) | 67.43 (2.65) | 66.37 (2.61) | 691.86 (27.24) |
| Mean monthly sunshine hours | 46.04 | 66.35 | 105.78 | 148.68 | 185.47 | 166.10 | 182.71 | 161.23 | 127.60 | 95.72 | 57.96 | 42.52 | 1,386.16 |
Source: The Met Office

== Economy ==
=== Shoemaking ===
Stafford has a history of shoemaking as far back as 1476, when it was a cottage industry, but a manufacturing process was introduced in the 1700s. William Horton founded a business in 1767 that became the largest shoe company in Stafford, selling worldwide. He had several government contracts through the town's Member of Parliament (MP), the playwright Richard Brinsley Sheridan. The shoe industry gradually died out in the late 20th century, with Lotus Shoes the last manufacturer. Its factory in Sandon Road was demolished in 2001 and replaced by housing.

=== Engineering ===
A locomotive firm, W. G. Bagnall, was set up in 1875 to manufacture steam engines for the London, Midland and Scottish Railway and the Great Western Railway. Between 1875 and 1962, the Castle Engine Works in Castle Town produced 1,869 locomotives, including steam, diesel and electric. It was taken over in 1961 by English Electric, which also bought the Stafford-based engine manufacturer W.H. Dorman & Co. This had merged with Bagnall's by then. Amerton Railway, based on the outskirts of Stafford is a heritage railway originally constructed to display and operate a W. G. Bagnall steam locomotive.

Since 1901, a major industrial activity has been heavy electrical engineering, particularly power station transformers. The works have been successively owned by Siemens Brothers, English Electric, GEC and GEC Alsthom. Alstom T&D was sold in 2004 to Areva. At the end of 2009, Areva T&D was split between former owners Alstom and Schneider Electric. At the end of 2015, the works were acquired by General Electric consolidating Stafford as the Centre of Excellence for HVDC, AC Substations and Converter Transformers. Each transformer weighs several hundred tons and a road train is used for transport. In the 1968 Hixon rail crash, one such road train was struck by an express train on a level crossing.

British Reinforced Concrete Engineering (BRC) moved from Manchester and opened a large factory in Stafford in 1926. In the late 1970s, BRC employed around 750 people in Stafford, however the business declined, and the factory closed in 1990.

Perkins Engines has a factory for diesel engines in Littleworth. Stafford is also a dormitory town for commuting to Stoke-on-Trent and Birmingham.

Universal Grinding Wheel Ltd was founded in the town in 1913. Its Doxey Road site was enlarged over the years to cover 44 acres (18 ha). By the 1970s the company had become Europe's largest manufacturer of grinding wheels. The company was taken over a number of times, eventually becoming part of French multi-national Saint-Gobain. The business relocated to new premises on an industrial park in the north of the town and the Doxey Road factory was demolished in 2019.

=== Other manufacturing ===
Adhesives manufacturer Bostik, which took over Evode Ltd has a factory on Common Road.

=== Services ===
The public sector provides much local employment, with Staffordshire County Council, Stafford Borough Council and Staffordshire Police all headquartered in the town. Stafford Prison, County Hospital and MOD Stafford are other sources of public-sector employment.

The town was home to the computer science and IT campus of the University of Staffordshire, along with Beaconside campus, which housed the Faculty of Computing Engineering and Technology and part of the Business School. These have all been transferred to Stoke-on-Trent. The only block of the University of Staffordshire left in use is the School of Health in Blackheath Lane, which teaches medical nursing. The main Stoke campus lies about 18 miles (30 km) to the north.

The Guildhall Shopping Centre in the centre of town offered over 40 retail outlets; it has since closed. The three superstores around the main town centre were joined by two others in 2018.

The Stafford Railway Building Society was established in 1877. It rebranded and changed its name to the Stafford Building Society on 1 March 2024 and has its head office in the town centre.

== Demographics ==
At the 2021 census there were 70,145 residents in Stafford, up from 68,472, in the 2011 census, and 62,440 in the 2001 census.

In terms of ethnicity in 2021:

- 90.6% of Stafford residents were White
- 4.5% were Asian
- 1.6% were Black
- 2.3% were Mixed.
- 0.7% were from another ethnic group.

In terms of religion, 51.8% of Stafford residents identified as Christian, 42.9% said they had no religion, 1.7% were Muslim, 1.5% were Hindu, 0.8% were Sikh, 0.6% were Buddhists, and 0.6% were from another religion.

== Transport ==
=== Railways ===
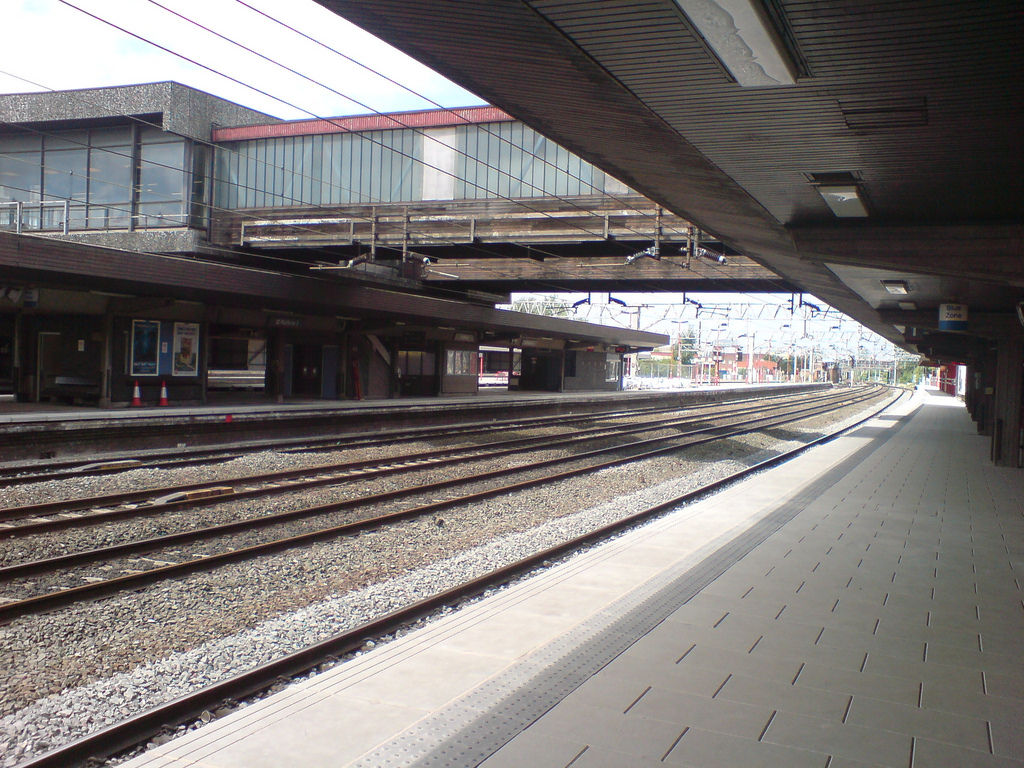
Stafford railway station

Stafford railway station was once a major railway hub, but the suspension of passenger services on the Stafford to Uttoxeter line in 1939 and of the Stafford to Shrewsbury Line during the Beeching cuts in 1964 eliminated the station's east-west traffic.

Services are provided by three train operating companies:

- Avanti West Coast operates five inter-city routes on the West Coast Main Line that stop at Stafford; these run between London Euston and Edinburgh Waverley, Glasgow Central, Holyhead, Liverpool Lime Street and Manchester Piccadilly
- CrossCountry operates services between Manchester Piccadilly and Birmingham New Street, with services continuing alternately either to Bristol Temple Meads or Bournemouth
- London Northwestern Railway operates stopping services between Crewe and London Euston, and between Birmingham New Street and Liverpool Lime Street.

=== Roads ===
Junctions 13 (Stafford South & Central) and 14 (Stafford North) of the M6 motorway provide access to the town, so that Birmingham and Manchester are easily reached. The A34 runs through the town centre and links with Stone and Stoke-on-Trent to the north and to the West Midlands conurbation to the south including Birmingham, Walsall and Wolverhampton. The A518 road connects Stafford with Telford to the south-west and Uttoxeter to the north-east. The A449 runs south from the town centre to the nearby town of Penkridge and to Wolverhampton. Finally, the A513 runs east from Stafford to the local towns of Rugeley and Lichfield.

=== Buses ===
There are several bus interchanges in Stafford town centre, rather than a single bus station; Gaol Square and Chell Road are the most used.

Stafford is predominantly served by Select Bus and Chaserider (formerly a name used by Midland Red North which became part of Arriva Midlands until the Cannock depot sale to D&G). Stafford depot having closed a few years earlier. Select Bus operates local circulars, such as to Highfields and longer distance routes to Coven, Wolverhampton and Cannock. Chaserider operates longer distance routes to Cannock, Rugeley, Lichfield, Uttoxeter and surrounding areas. Arriva Midlands still operates a service to Telford. First Potteries operates service 101 to Stoke-on-Trent.

Stafford has five taxi firms and several independent operators from ranks at the station, Bridge St, Broad St and Salter St.

=== Canal ===
The Staffordshire and Worcestershire Canal runs close to the Baswich and Wildwood areas and was once linked to the River Sow by the River Sow Navigation.

== Politics and public services ==
=== Local government ===
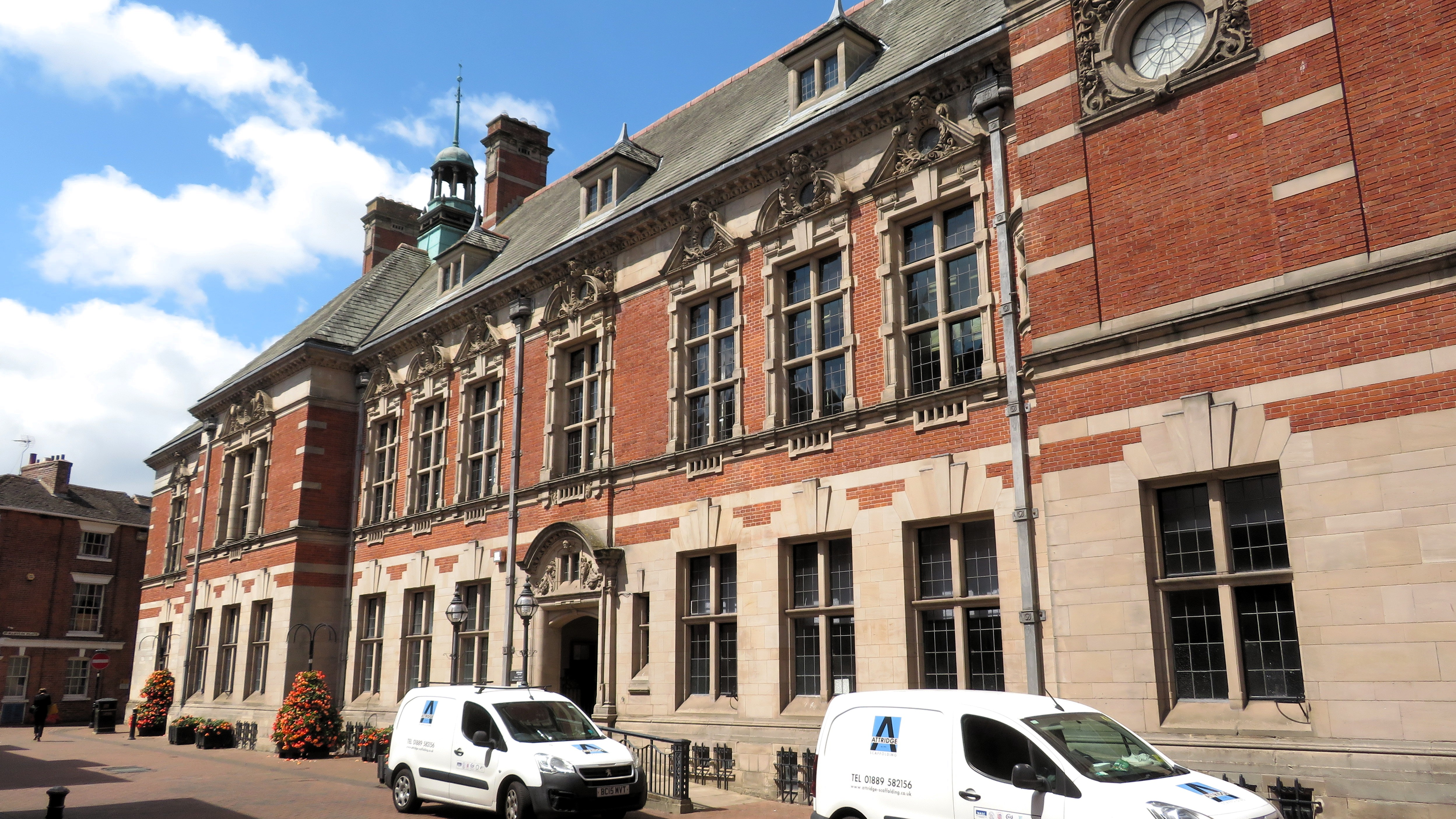
County Buildings, Martin Street

Staffordshire County Council headquarters are in central Stafford. Most staff in the town work in the Staffordshire Place development, which opened in 2011. The shift of administrative staff to Staffordshire Place meant conversion of most offices into private homes, but the County Council still meets at County Buildings in Martin St.

For much of the 20th century, the local municipal council was based at the Borough Hall in Eastgate Street. Following local government reorganisation in 1974, a modern Civic Centre was built for the enlarged Stafford Borough Council in Riverside and completed in 1978.

Under current local government reorganisation plans, both the county council and the borough council will be abolished and merged into a new South and Mid Staffordshire unitary authority in 2028.

The town's main library, once in the Shire Hall, has moved to the ground floor of 1 Staffordshire Place, with smaller libraries in Rising Brook, Baswich and Holmcroft. The William Salt Library in the town centre has a large collection of printed books, pamphlets, manuscripts, drawings, watercolours and transcripts built up by William Salt.

=== National representation ===
Stafford has its own parliamentary constituency, represented since 2024 by Leigh Ingham of the Labour Party.

=== Emergency services ===
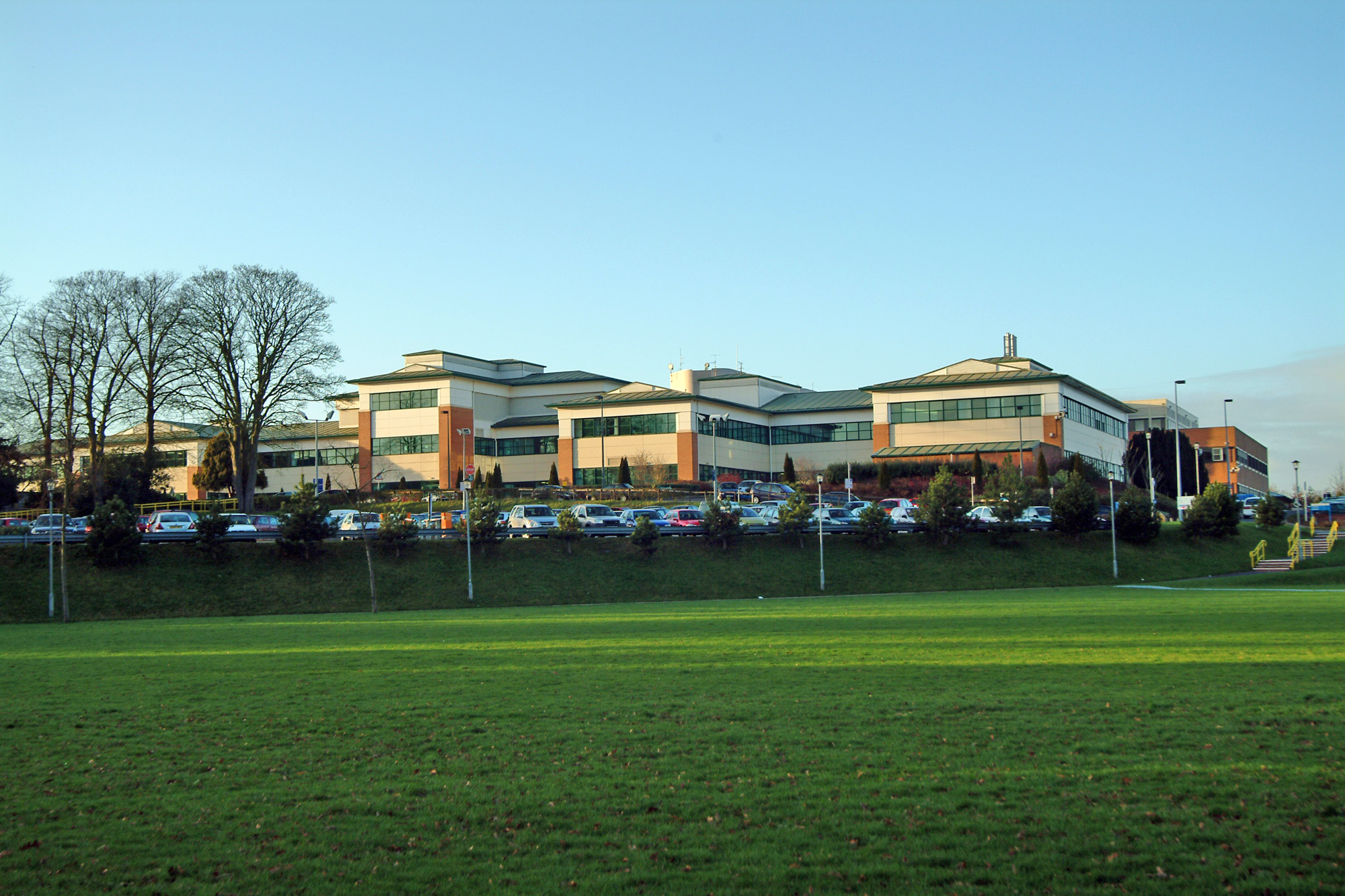
Stafford Hospital

County Hospital provides a range of non-specialist medical and surgical services. Its accident and emergency unit is the only such facility in the town. In March 2009, the hospital was involved in a scandal after the release of a Healthcare Commission report that detailed severe failings. St George's Hospital, part of the South Staffordshire and Shropshire Health Care Trust, is a combination of the Kingsmead (previously an elderly care facility) and St George's psychiatric hospital. It provides mental health services, including a psychiatric intensive care unit, secure units, an eating disorder unit, an EMI unit for the elderly and mentally frail, drug and alcohol addiction services, and open wards. There is an outpatient facility, where the town's Alcoholics Anonymous also meets. Rowley Hall Hospital in Rowley Park is private and run by Ramsay Healthcare, but offers some NHS treatment. The town receives primary health care from the South Staffordshire Clinical Commissioning Group (CCG).

Policing is provided by Staffordshire Police, headquartered in Weston Road. Its former headquarters in Cannock Road is giving way to a housing estate. There is a town-centre police station in Eastgate St. Statutory emergency fire and rescue service is provided by the Staffordshire Fire and Rescue Service, which has stations in Beaconside and Rising Brook.

=== Justice ===
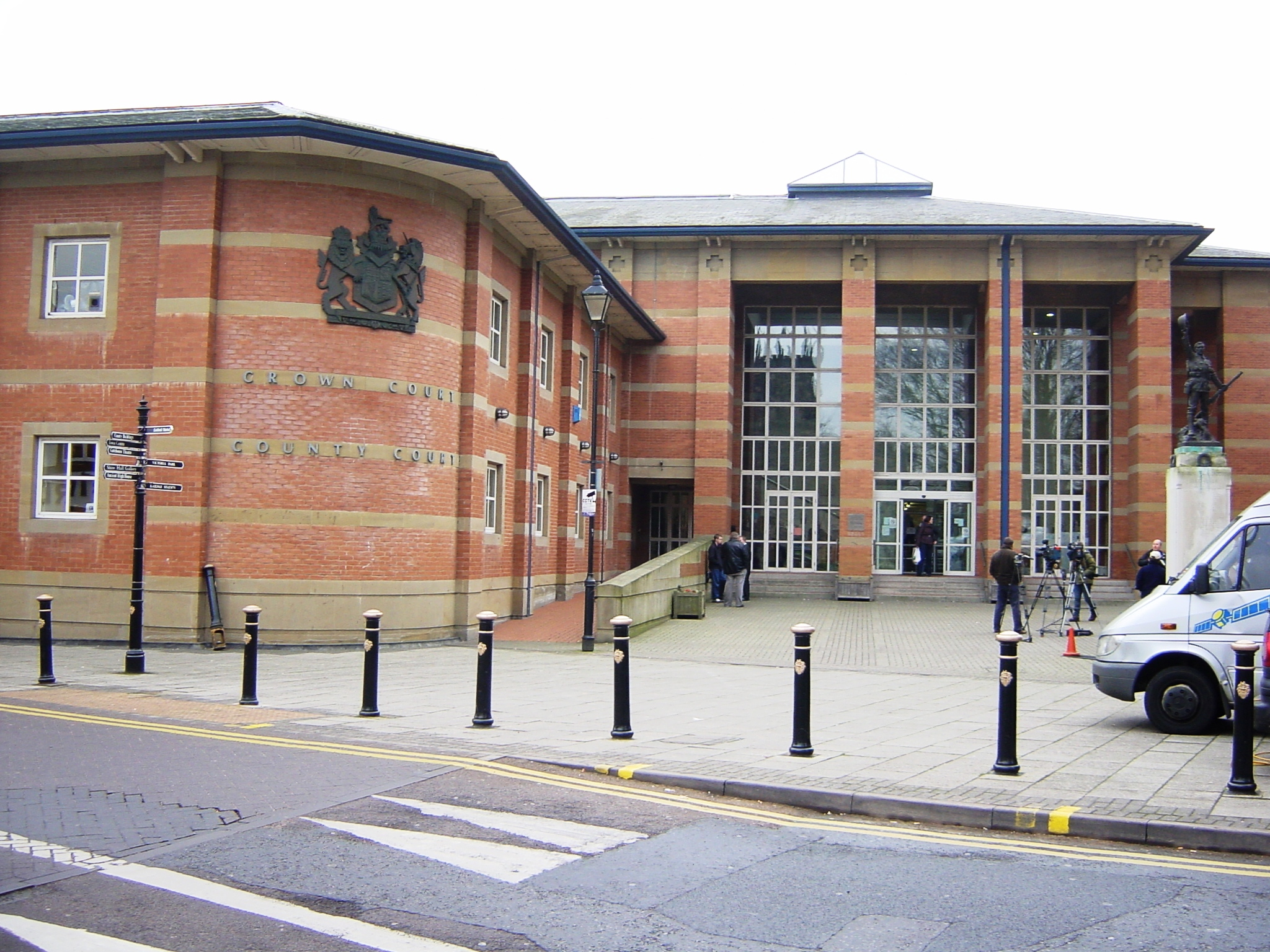
Stafford Crown Court

Stafford Crown Court and Stafford County Court share a building in the town centre. There was a magistrates' court in nearby South Walls, but it closed in 2016. The Shire Hall, completed in 1798, used to be a courthouse but is now an art gallery.

Stafford Prison, operated by HM Prison Service, provides accommodation for about 750 male sex offenders. It was built on its current site in 1794 and has been in almost continuous use, except between 1916 and 1940.

== Suburbs and areas ==
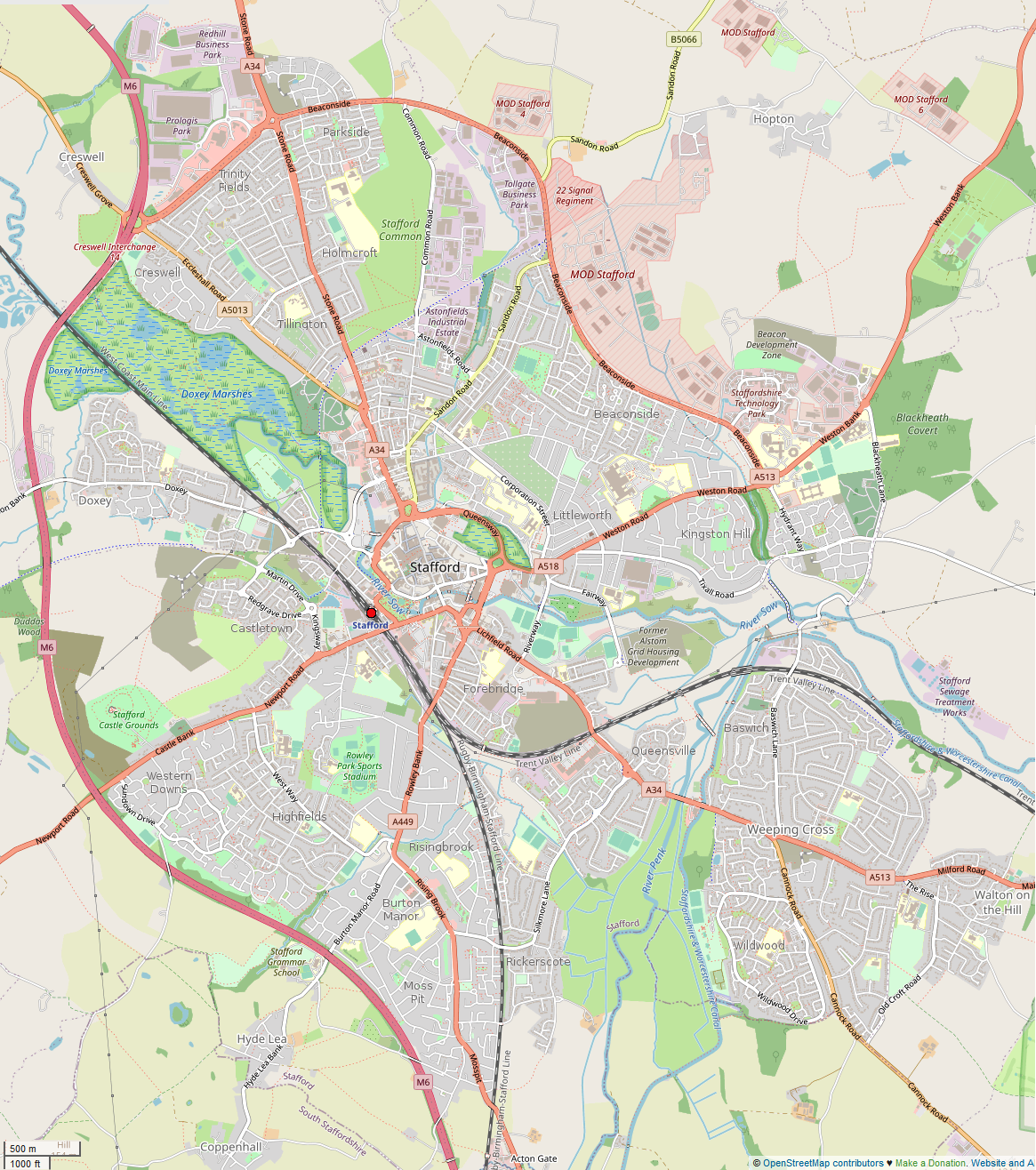
Map of Stafford

- Baswich

An estate towards Rugeley and Cannock from Stafford town centre

- Beaconside
- Burton Manor
- Castle House Gardens
- Castle House Drive
- Castlefields

An estate built on the wetlands off Newport Road in the early 1990s. Roads are named after then famous athletes (Gunnell Close, Christie Drive etc.)

- Castletown

Estate of terraced cottages built in the 1830s and 1840s for an influx of railway workers. Its former church, St Thomas's, was demolished in the 1970s and replaced by a new one in Doxey. The offices of Staffordshire Newsletter now occupy the site.

- The Crossings

An estate built on the site of Stychfields in the grounds of the Alstom factory. It also includes a retail park.

- Coppenhall
- Coton Fields
- Doxey
- Forebridge
- Highfields

A council estate between Wolverhampton Road and Newport Road. The first houses were built about 1955 and many others ("Highfields No. 2 estate" in 1963–1964. West Way is its longest street. Many streets added in the 1960s are named after poets and playwrights (Shakespeare Road, Masefield Drive, Coleridge Drive, Keats Avenue, Tennyson Road, Binyon Court, etc.) Much of the original estate was built on Preston's Farm land. Two tower blocks stood in Milton Grove: Brooke Court, mainly used as student housing, was demolished in 1998 for a housing development. Binyon Court was renovated and renamed the Keep.

- Holmcroft
- Hyde Lea
- King Edward Court
- Kingston Hill
- Littleworth
- Manor Estate
- Meadowcroft Park
- Moss Pit

Moss Pit is in southern Stafford, approximately one mile from Junction 13 of the M6 motorway; areas include the Pippins, the Chestnuts and Scholar's Gate.

- Parkside

A housing estate in the north of the town built in the 1970s. It has two entrances from the A513 Beaconside Road and access to three parks, a green and Stafford Common. It has a primary school (Parkside Primary School) and Sir Graham Balfour School, rebuilt in 2001. Some school grounds were sold off for the adjacent Oaks housing estate. There is a precinct of shops and a bus terminus.

- Queensville
- Rising Brook
- Rickerscote

Rickerscote had a lane running from the Silkmore estate towards the area of the bridge to Argos. The area is known to many as the village and has a shop. Its large area of grassland is known as the Green.
Other local areas are the Conker Tree, Boulton's Farm, Devil's Triangle and the Metal Bridge.

- Rowley Park
- Silkmore

Silkmore, between Rickerscote and Meadowcroft, by the Rising Brook. It has a primary school and a selection of shops. It has seen a development programme to upgrade the exteriors of the housing.
An area of Silkmore near the old Southend Club was subject to flooding. It has been replaced with new homes. Other parts such as Pioneer, the Garage and Finney's Farm have been replaced by homes or the Co-op.

- St. George's

A development close to St George's Hospital along St George's Parkway, with various modern buildings, including a modern interpretation of a Georgian crescent. Work has begun on restoring the hospital building, disused since 1995, as luxury flats.

- Tillington, Staffordshire
- Trinity Fields
- The Oaks

An estate off the A34 built on the site of the old Sir Graham Balfour School in the extreme north of Stafford. Coppice Way, so named after the adjacent Coppice is located where the environmental science department of the school used to be. Old School Drive and Balfour Way are located on the site of the old school's Balfour and Trinity buildings used to be.

- Walton on the Hill

To the south of Stafford bordering Milford. Walton High School is specialist science school.

- Weeping Cross

An estate on the east side of Stafford, off Radford Bank, towards Rugeley and Cannock. It contains the Leasowes Primary and St Anne's Catholic Primary schools.

- Western Downs

This borders Highfields and the M6 motorway. A green area with two football pitches and a basketball court known as Bottom Pitches can be found, along with Rainbow Park in Clarendon Drive and Dome Park in Torridge Drive.

- Wildwood

A large estate with a ring road that joins the A34 road. It was built around the 1970s and housed many of the Stafford police force at its HQ was on the opposite side of the A34.

== MOD Stafford ==
MOD Stafford is located on Beaconside. Originally RAF Stafford, the base was a non-flying Royal Air Force station. It was redesignated MOD Stafford in March 2006, an event marked by a fly-past and a flag-lowering ceremony. For many years, the site employed civilians and military personnel, but it was handed over by the Royal Air Force under the current policy of defence strategy and streamlining. A small Tactical Supply Wing (TSW) still operates from the base, which now houses two Royal Signals units and an RAF Regiment contingent alongside Tactical Supply Wing.

== Education ==
=== Primary schools ===
- Anson CE (A) Primary School
- Barnfields Primary School
- Berkswich CE Primary School
- Blessed Mother Teresa RC Primary School (Formerly Bower Norris)
- Brooklands Preparatory School (Independent)
- Burton Manor Primary School
- Castlechurch Primary School
- Cooper Perry Primary School
- Flash Ley Community Primary School
- John Wheeldon Primary School
- Leasowes Primary School (founded 2006)
- Oakridge Primary School (plus nursery)
- Parkside Primary School
- Rowley Park Primary Academy (Formerly The Grove)
- Silkmore Primary School
- Stafford Preparatory School
- St Anne's RC Primary School
- St Austin's RC Primary School
- St Bede's Preparatory School (Independent)
- St John's CE Primary School
- St Leonard's Primary School
- St Patrick's Catholic Primary School
- St Paul's Primary School
- Doxey Primary School
- Tillington Manor Primary School (formerly Holmcroft Primary School)

=== Secondary schools ===
- Blessed William Howard Catholic School
- King Edward VI High School (Highfields)
- Stafford Grammar School. Selective, independent school, Founded 1982.
- Stafford Manor High School (formerly Rising Brook High School and Stafford Sports College)
- Sir Graham Balfour School
- Walton High School
- Weston Road Academy

=== Tertiary education ===
Stafford College is a large college of further education. It also provides some higher education courses on behalf of Staffordshire University, focusing on computing and engineering.

South Staffordshire College has a base in the village of Rodbaston on the edge of Stafford. It is largely an agricultural college.

The University of Staffordshire had a large campus in the east of the town which focused heavily on computing, engineering and media technologies (film, music and computer games). It also ran teacher-training courses. The university had two halls of residence opposite the campus, the smaller Yarlet with 51 rooms and the larger Stafford Court with 554 Rooms. Stafford Court was divided into 13 "houses" named after local villages. This part of the campus closed in 2016, with the majority of facilities relocating to its new campus in Stoke-on-Trent. The University retains a significant presence at its Blackheath Lane campus to cater for Health related courses, such as Nursing and Paramedics.

== Media ==
=== Newspapers ===
Stafford is covered by the Express & Star and Staffordshire Newsletter, neither of which have offices in the town.

=== Television ===
Stafford is covered by BBC West Midlands and ITV Central, both broadcasting from Birmingham to the wider West Midlands region. Stafford is mainly served by the Sutton Coldfield transmitting station, just north of Birmingham, but some residents get a better picture from The Wrekin transmitting station, near Telford.

=== Radio ===
Stafford is served by BBC Radio Stoke, with a transmitter based on top of the County Education building. It is also served by commercial station Greatest Hits Radio (programming from London, Manchester or Birmingham for most of the day), broadcasting on 96.9 FM from a transmitter at Pye Green BT Tower, near Hednesford.

Stafford can also receive the West Midlands regionals, like Heart West Midlands and Smooth West Midlands, and is at the very north of the Hits Radio Black Country & Shropshire coverage area.

BFBS Gurkha Radio broadcasts locally on 1278 kHz medium wave from Beacon Barracks.

The town's first community licensed station, Stafford FM, launched in 2015 after a number of restricted service FM licences. It is a community radio station with a fixed studio broadcasting from Stafford to Stafford. The station rebranded in April 2024 to Vibe 1; many locals responded negatively to the name change. The station went off the air in June 2026 but returned on 4 August 2026.

== Sport ==
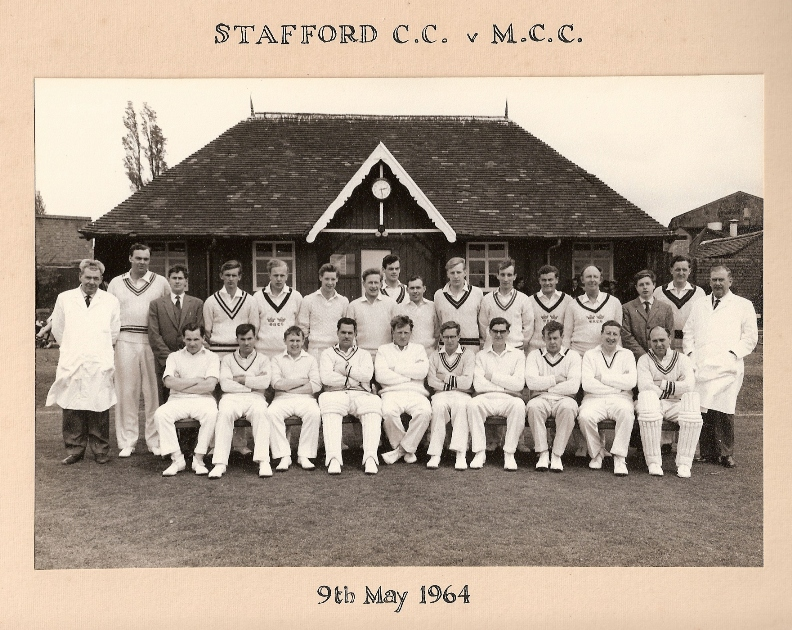
Stafford CC versus the MCC in their centenary year, 1964

Stafford is home to three association football clubs: Stafford Rangers F.C., Brocton F.C. and Stafford Town F.C., none of which play at a fully professional level.

The town has two rugby union clubs, though again they do not play at a high level.

There is a local hockey club with eight adult teams.

Stafford Post Office Rifle and Pistol Club is a Home Office approved rifle club founded in 1956. It has a 25-yard indoor range attached to the Stafford Post Office Social Club. In addition to short-range indoor shooting facilities, the club has a number of outdoor ranges, including Kingsbury, Sennybridge and Thorpe, for larger-calibre long-range shooting.

Stafford Cricket and Hockey Club, an ECB Clubmark Accredited Club founded in 1864, is almost certainly the town's oldest sports club. It appears to have played originally at the Lammascotes, before being offered a field at the Hough (Lichfield Road/GEC site) in 1899, which belonged to the grammar school. In 1984 the club made a move to Riverway in 1984, as the Hough came under the ownership of GEC. It currently owns 11 acres (4 ha) at Riverway and hosts numerous sports: two cricket pitches in summer and football, mini-football, rugby and hockey facilities in winter. In 1999, it won a £200,000 lottery grant towards a new pavilion completed in 2000, with six changing rooms and a function room. The cricket section welcomes players of all abilities. Four senior sides play on Saturdays. The first and second elevens play in the North Staffordshire and South Cheshire League. The third and fourth elevens play in the Stone and District Cricket League. There is also a senior team that plays in the Lichfield Sunday League. The five junior sides are for under 9s, under 11s, under 13s, under 15s and under 17s.

In December 2018, a parkrun (free weekly timed 5k run/walk) was launched in Stafford on the Isabel Trail, a public foot/cycle path that follows part of the former course of the Stafford–Uttoxeter railway. The run/walk takes place on Saturday mornings at 09:00am, starting at the southern end of the Isabel Trail by Sainsbury's supermarket.

== The Staffordshire knot ==
Stafford Knot

The Stafford knot, sometimes Staffordshire knot, is a distinctive three-looped tie that is the traditional symbol of the county and county town, used on buildings, logos and coats of arms. It also gives its name to a pub and a multi-operator bus ticket.

== Notable people ==
Notable people from Stafford include the 17th-century author of The Compleat Angler (1653), Izaak Walton, whose cottage at nearby Shallowford is now an angling museum, and the 18th-century playwright Richard Brinsley Sheridan, who was once the local MP. The 1853 Lord Mayor of London Thomas Sidney was also born in the town.

In the early 1900s, the village of Great Haywood near Stafford became home to the famous The Lord of the Rings author J. R. R. Tolkien and his wife, Edith, in her cottage in the village during the winter of 1916. Surrounding areas were said to have inspired some of his early works.

The Scottish poet, playwright and freelancer Carol Ann Duffy, though born in Glasgow, grew up in Stafford and attended Stafford Girls' High School. Many of her poems describe experiences and places in Stafford. She was the Poet laureate from 2009 to 2019, and now lives in Manchester.

Baron Stafford is a title created several times in the Peerage of England. A full schedule of over 30 of the eponymous title holders is listed at Baron Stafford. Here just three are included.

=== Early times ===
In birth order:

- Ralph de Stafford, 2nd Baron Stafford, 1st Earl of Stafford (1301–1372), a notable soldier in the Hundred Years' War
- Henry Stafford, 1st Baron Stafford (1501–1563) In 1531 Stafford elected him recorder for the borough. He was later appointed JP for Staffordshire and Shropshire and Lord-Lieutenant of Staffordshire. His descendants supported Catholic missions in the town, leading to the building of St Austin's Church.
- Richard Barnfield (1574 in Norbury – 1620) poet, had an obscure but close relationship with William Shakespeare that interests scholars.
- Thomas Maxfield (real name Macclesfield) (c. 1590–1616), Roman Catholic priest and a Catholic martyr, beatified in 1929, was born in Stafford gaol.

=== 18th and 19th centuries ===
In birth order:

- Sir Robert Pigot, 2nd Baronet (1720–1796 in Stafford), a British Army officer during the American Revolutionary War
- Lieutenant General Sir William Congreve, 1st Baronet (1742 in Stafford – 1814), a British military officer who improved artillery strength through gunpowder experiments
- James Oatley, Sr. (c. 1769 in Stafford – 1839), an Australian watch and clock maker and one-time convict. Oatley, aged 44, was sentenced to penal transportation for life for stealing shirts and bedding. He had an earlier conviction for stealing a ton of cheese.
- James Trubshaw (1777 in Colwich – 1853) English builder, architect and civil engineer
- John Prescott Knight (1803 in Stafford – 1881) English portrait painter, Secretary of the Royal Academy from 1848 until 1873
- George Smith (1805–1874), known as Throttler Smith, was an English hangman at Stafford gaol from 1840 until 1872.
- Charles Pye (1820 in Stafford – 1876) sergeant-major, recipient of the Victoria Cross
- William Palmer (1824 in Rugeley – 1856 in Stafford Prison) an English doctor found guilty in 1855 of the murder by poisoning of his friend John Cook and executed by George Smith in public by hanging
- Benjamin Broomhall (1829 in Bradley – 1911) author and advocate of foreign missions, administrator of China Inland Mission
- Francis Webb (1836 in Tixall – 1906) British engineer responsible for the design and manufacture of locomotives for the London and North Western Railway (LNWR)
- Edward Ilsley (1838 in Stafford – 1926) prelate in the Roman Catholic Church, first Archbishop of Birmingham (1888–1921)
- Whitaker Wright (1846 in Stafford – 1904) company promoter and swindler, who committed suicide at the Royal Courts of Justice in London immediately after his conviction for fraud.
- Ernest Shears (1849–1917 in Stafford), an Anglican clergyman in South Africa, retired to Stafford.
- William Gordon Bagnall (1852–1907) British mechanical engineer, founded the locomotive manufacturing company of W.G. Bagnall in 1875 which operated until taken over in 1962 by English Electric
- Captain Egerton Bagot Byrd Levett-Scrivener (1857 in Milford Hall – 1954) Royal Navy Flag Lieutenant and aide to Vice Admiral George Willes in the Far East
- Alice Hawkins (1863 in Stafford – 1946) a leading English suffragette among the boot and shoe machinists of Leicester

=== 20th century ===
In birth order:

- G. Godfrey Phillips (1900–1965) was the town clerk from 1932 to 1934. He then became secretary and later Commissioner General of the Shanghai Municipal Council.
- Moira Forsyth (1905–1991) stained-glass artist
- Falkner Allison (1907–1993) Anglican bishop successively of Chelmsford and the Winchester.
- Michael John Wise (1918–2015) academic, professor of geography at the University of London
- Thomas Worrall Kent (1922–2011) Canadian economist, journalist, editor, public servant, and industrialist; born in Stafford
- Sarah Buck (born 1953) structural and civil engineer and business woman in engineering and construction, attended Stafford Girls High School.
- Francis Melfort William Fitzherbert, 15th Baron Stafford (born 1954), landowner and peer, Chancellor of Staffordshire University
- Alun Kyte (born 1964) double murderer, suspected of many other murders of prostitutes
- Mike Dilger (born 1966) ecologist, ornithologist and TV presenter
- Sir Jony Ive (born 1967), iPhone designer, went to school at Stafford Walton High School and now resides in San Francisco, California.
- Hannah Maybank (born in Stafford 1974) artist best known for the ripped and distressed surfaces of her three-dimensional paintings in acrylic.

=== Music, acting and writing ===
- Rodney Milnes (1936–2015) music critic, translator and broadcaster, with an interest in opera
- Dave Follows (1941–2003), British cartoonist, lived in Stafford best known for his comic strip Creature Feature
- Patrick Fyffe (1942–2002) creator of Dame Hilda Bracket
- Pete Haycock (1951 in Stafford – 2013) musician, film score composer and founding member of the Climax Blues Band
- Storm Constantine (1956–2021) British science fiction and fantasy author primarily known for her Wraeththu series
- Mark Curry (born in Stafford 1961) actor and television and radio presenter
- Neil Morrissey (born in Stafford 1962) actor, star of Men Behaving Badly
- Climax Blues Band formed in 1968, a popular Stafford blues band which later achieved international record success
- Dominic Mafham (born 1968), actor born in Stafford
- Medicine Head 1970s hit duo, hailed from nearby Tixall.
- Dave Gorman (born 1971) comedian, author and television presenter
- Duncan Botwood (born 1972 in Stafford) video game designer and voice actor
- Fran Healy (born in Stafford 1973) singer in Travis moved to Scotland when very young.
- Kieron Gillen, (born 1975) British computer games and music journalist and comic book author. He went to Blessed William Howard Catholic High School.
- Tom Vaughan (born in Stafford 1985) television actor, played the part of Spike in Channel 4 series Hollyoaks in 2007.
- Bizarre Inc, rave act formed in 1989
- Altern-8, rave act formed in Stafford in 1990
- Chicken Lips, dance music band, production team formed in 1999, successor to Bizarre Inc
- Anna Chell (born 1994), English actress who has starred in Casualty

=== Sport ===
- Charles Baker (1867–1924) played in the Football League for Stoke F.C. and Wolverhampton Wanderers F.C.
- Walter Twigg (1883 in Weeping Cross – 1963) field hockey player and cricketer
- Harry Hutsby (1886 in Stafford – 1971) joined Stoke F.C. in 1908 from local side Stafford Wednesday
- Bill Aston (1900 in Hopton – 1974) racing driver, participated in three World Championship Grands Prix
- Joe Hulme (1904–1991) English footballer and cricketer, played 333 times for Arsenal F.C. and 225 times for Middlesex as an aggressive middle-order batsman and medium-fast bowler.
- Walter Robins (1906–1968) cricketer and footballer. He was one of Wisden's Cricketers of the Year in 1930.
- Brian Little (born 1953) former Aston Villa player and manager lives in the town.
- Nigel Callaghan (born 1962) professional footballer with Aston Villa, Derby County and Watford, lives and DJs in the town.
- David Fell (born 1964), cricketer
- Phil Robinson (born 1967) Recruitment manager at Manchester City, former footballer, with 567 pro appearances mainly for Notts County, Huddersfield Town, Stoke City, Hereford United and Stafford Rangers.
- Chris Birchall (born 1984), footballer, scored 21 goals in 322 appearances in a 16-year professional career, and four goals in 43 international matches,
- Christopher Paget (born 1987), right-handed batsman and right-arm offbreak bowler, plays for Derbyshire.
- Joe Leach (born 1990) cricketer, is a right-handed batsman who bowls right-arm fast-medium for Worcestershire, as a first-team regular in 2015 and county captain in 2016.
- Steve Leach (born 1993), cricketer
- Nick Yelloly (born 1990 in Stafford) auto racing driver
- Emma Wilkins (born 1991) sprint freestyle swimmer, born in Stafford
- Morgan Gibbs-White (born 2000 in Stafford) English footballer, midfielder for Nottingham Forest F.C., went to Sir Graham Balfour.

=== Politics ===
- Richard Stanford (fl.1382–1402) politician, MP for Stafford in May 1382, 1386, September 1388, 1391, 1399 and 1402
- Sir Thomas Offley (c. 1500/05–1582), a Sheriff of London and Lord Mayor of London.
- Matthew Cradock (1584–1636) wool merchant, elected MP for Stafford in 1621, re-elected in 1624, 1625 and 1628. He sat until 1629, when King Charles dispensed with Parliament for eleven years.
- Sir Edward Leigh (1602–1671) an English lay writer on religious topics and MP for Stafford 1645 to 1648.
- John Swinfen (1613–1694 in Weeford) politician, elected MP for Stafford in 1660 in the Convention Parliament
- John Campbell, 1st Baron Campbell (1779–1861) Liberal MP for Stafford in 1830 & 1831, lawyer and man of letters.
- Sir Walter Essex (1857–1941) businessman and Liberal Party politician, MP for Stafford from 1910 to 1918
- Sir Charles Shaw, 1st Baronet (1859 in Wolverhampton – 1942) Liberal Party politician, MP for Stafford from 1892 to 1910
- William Ormsby-Gore, 4th Baron Harlech (1885–1964) Conservative politician and banker, MP for Stafford from 1918 until he entered the House of Lords on succeeding to his father's peerage in 1938.
- Peter Thorneycroft, Baron Thorneycroft (1909–1994) Conservative Party politician, MP for Stafford from 1938 to 1945 and Chancellor of the Exchequer between 1957 and 1958
- Stephen Swingler (1915–1969) Labour Party politician, MP for Stafford from 1945 to 1950, and for Newcastle under Lyme from 1951 to 1969
- Sir Hugh Fraser (1918–1984) Conservative politician, first husband of Lady Antonia Fraser and MP for Stafford from 1945 until 1984
- Sir William Nigel Paul Cash (born 1940), known as Bill Cash, Conservative politician and MP for Stafford from 1984 to 1997
- David Kidney (born 1955) Labour Party politician, MP for Stafford from 1997 to 2010
- Patrick McLoughlin MP (born 1957 in Stafford) Conservative Party politician; the son and grandson of coal miners
- Jeremy Lefroy (born 1959) Conservative Party politician, MP for Stafford from 2010 to 2019

== Nature reserves ==
These nature reserves are in Stafford:

- Astonfields Balancing Lakes, a local nature reserve, are two lakes constructed in recent decades for flood protection, a mile north of the town centre
- Doxey Marshes, managed by the Staffordshire Wildlife Trust, is a wet grassland habitat two miles north-west of the town centre
- Kingsmead Marsh, a local nature reserve, is a remnant of marshland near the town centre
- Radford Meadows, managed by the Staffordshire Wildlife Trust, is a flood plain two miles south of the town centre

== Nearby places ==
- Brewood
- Cannock
- Cannock Chase
- Creswell
- Eccleshall
- Great Haywood
- Heath Hayes and Wimblebury
- Hednesford
- Hixon
- Lichfield
- Little Haywood
- Newport, Shropshire
- Penkridge
- Rugeley
- Shugborough Hall
- Stoke-on-Trent
- Stone
- Trentham Gardens
- Uttoxeter
- Wolverhampton

== Twin towns ==
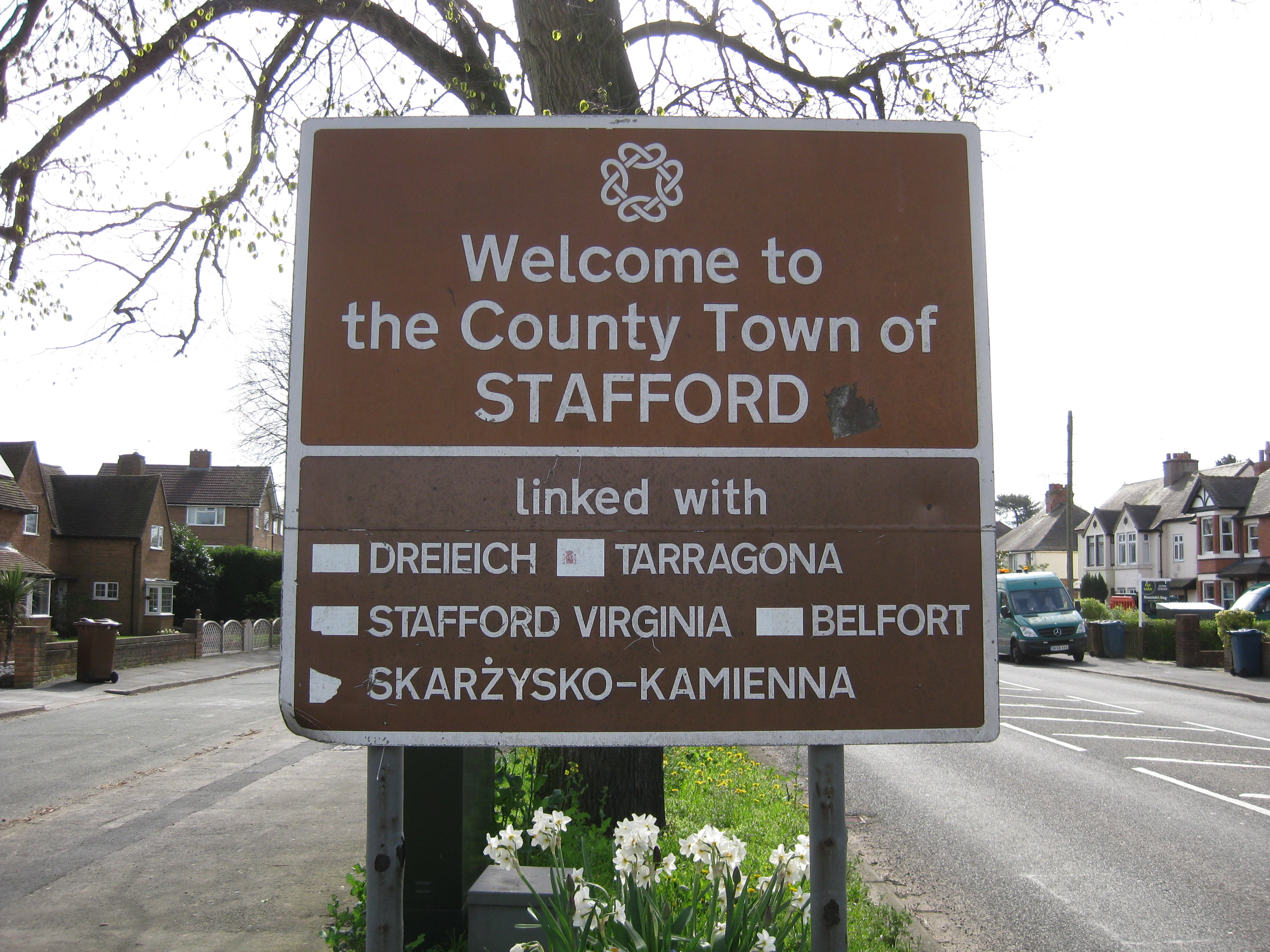
Town Twinning sign on Eccleshall Road

Stafford is twinned with:

- Belfort, France
- Dreieich, Germany
- Skarżysko-Kamienna, Poland
- Stafford, Virginia, United States
- Tarragona, Spain

== See also ==
- 1990 Stafford rail crash
- 1996 Stafford rail crash at Rickerscote
- HM Prison Stafford
- Stafford (UK Parliament constituency)
- Listed buildings in Stafford (Central Area)
- Listed buildings in Stafford (Outer Area)
- Stafford power station
- Amerton Railway
- Staffort (Village in Germany)
