= Tillington, Staffordshire =

Area of Stafford, England

Coordinates: 52.823°N 2.129°W

Tillington
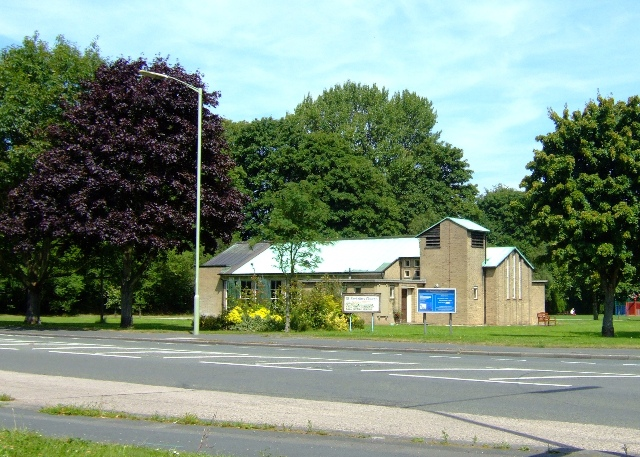
- St Bertelin's Church

- Location within Staffordshire
- District: Stafford
- Shire county: Staffordshire
- Region: West Midlands
- Country: England
- Sovereign state: United Kingdom

Tillington is an area of Stafford, in Staffordshire, England. The area lies about 1½ miles north of the town centre. Essentially, the district lies within a triangle formed by Eccleshall Road, Stone Road and Crab Lane that narrows southward to a point where the two roads join at Foregate Street. Since records were first kept, the area has been recorded as Tillington. In more modern times, the geographic area comprises Tillington, Holmcroft and Trinity Fields as designated Wards of Stafford Borough Council, along with part of the parish of Creswell.

== History ==
In 1841 Tillington was described as "an out-township liberty of the parochial township of St. Mary and St. Chad." In 1851 Tillington was described as being "one and a half miles N of Stafford, comprising an extra-parochial estate of 1090 acres, and 55 inhabitants, on three farms." Tillington was formerly an extra-parochial tract, from 1858 Tillington was a civil parish in its own right, on 1 April 1917 the parish was abolished and merged with Stafford. In 1911 the parish had a population of 1450.

== Places of interest ==
Tillington Hall was situated on the A5013 Eccleshall Road about 2 miles (3.2 km) northwest of Stafford town centre. An 1856 map shows a building, Tillington Cottage, on the site. Tillington Hall was a hotel. The 91-bedroom hotel was demolished and the site prepared for development in January 2022. The three-star hotel closed in May, 2021 after accommodating NHS staff and key-workers during the coronavirus lockdowns.

Tillington House (demolished c.1965), was an imposing, pillar-fronted c.1825 farmhouse with duck-pond and stables. The building was located immediately east of the A34 Stone Road, south of, and the other side the main road from the junction with Crab Lane. It was occupied c.1948-60 by the Holt family who farmed the local fields.

Tillington Ley, "A highly productive pasture composed largely of annual grasses and clovers." An area of land identified on the 1856 map. Situated on the Eccleshall Road in Creswell, Staffordshire about 1/4 mile NW, and on the same side of the road as Tillington Hall.

Tillington Villa (Vilia?). As shown on the 1856 map, is thought to be a large residential property comprising one large building, behind which lies a smaller one. The current property was, and maybe still is, the same house, or a turn-of-the-20th century replacement for it, located not quite directly opposite where Holmcroft Road intersects Eccleshall Road.
