= Stafford Grammar School =

Location
- Burton Manor; Stafford, Staffordshire, ST18 9AT; England; 52.783206°N 2.128368°W

Information
- Type: Private day school
- Motto: Quod Tibi Hoc Alteri
- Established: 1982
- Local authority: Staffordshire
- Department for Education URN: 124489 Tables
- Headteacher: Frank Johnson
- Gender: Coeducational
- Age: 4 to 18
- Enrolment: 400+
- Houses: 3
- Website: http://www.staffordgrammar.co.uk

Stafford Grammar School is a co-educational private day school at Burton Manor, founded in 1982 and located on the outskirts of Stafford, the county town of Staffordshire.

== Academic performance ==
In the academic year that finished in June 2006 the school was ranked top in Staffordshire based on league table results.
