= List of schools in Staffordshire =

This is a list of schools in Staffordshire, England

== State-funded schools ==
=== Primary schools ===
- All Saints CE Academy, Denstone
- All Saints CE First School, Church Leigh
- All Saints CE First School, Leek
- All Saints CE First School, Standon
- All Saints CE Primary School, Alrewas
- All Saints CE Primary School, Bednall
- All Saints CE Primary School, Rangemore
- All Saints CE Primary School, Ranton
- All Saints CE Primary School, Trysull
- Alsagers Bank Primary Academy, Alsagers Bank
- Amington Heath Primary School, Amington
- Anglesey Primary Academy, Burton upon Trent
- Anker Valley Primary Academy, Tamworth
- Ankermoor Primary Academy, Bolehall
- Anna Seward Primary, Lichfield
- Anson CE Primary School, Great Haywood
- Ashcroft Infants' School, Tamworth
- Baldwin's Gate CE Primary School, Baldwin's Gate
- Barlaston CE First School, Barlaston
- Barnfields Primary School, Stafford
- Beresford Memorial CE First School, Leek
- Berkswich CE Primary School, Walton-on-the-Hill
- Betley CE Primary School, Betley
- Bhylls Acre Primary School, Penn
- Birches First School, Codsall
- Bird's Bush Primary School, Tamworth
- Bishop Lonsdale CE Primary Academy, Eccleshall
- Bishop Rawle CE Primary School, Cheadle
- Blackshaw Moor CE First School, Blackshaw Moor
- Blakeley Heath Primary School, Wombourne
- Blessed Mother Teresa's RC Primary School, Stafford
- Boney Hay Primary Academy, Burntwood
- Bramshall Meadows First School, Uttoxeter
- Bridgtown Primary School, Bridgtown
- Brindley Heath Academy, Kinver
- Bursley Academy, Bradwell
- Burton Fields School, Burton upon Trent
- Burton Manor Primary School, Stafford
- Castle Primary School, Mow Cop
- Castlechurch Primary School, Stafford
- Chadsmead Primary Academy, Lichfield
- Chadsmoor CE Junior School, Chadsmoor
- Chadsmoor Community Infants School, Chadsmoor
- Chancel Primary School, Rugeley
- Charnwood Primary Academy, Lichfield
- Chase Terrace Primary School, Burntwood
- Chase View Community Primary School, Rugeley
- Cheadle Primary School, Cheadle
- Cheslyn Hay Primary School, Cheslyn Hay
- Chesterton Primary School, Chesterton
- Christ Church CE First School, Stone
- Christ Church CE Primary School, Lichfield
- Christ Church Primary School, Burton upon Trent
- Church Eaton Primary School, Church Eaton
- Churchfield CE Primary Academy, Rugeley
- Churchfields Primary School, Chesterton
- Colwich CE Primary School, Colwich
- Co-op Academy Friarswood, Newcastle-under-Lyme
- Cooper Perry Primary School, Seighford
- Corbett CE Primary School, Bobbington
- Coton Green Primary School, Tamworth
- Crackley Bank Primary School, Newcastle-under-Lyme
- The Croft Primary School, Armitage
- Dilhorne Endowed CE Primary School, Dilhorne
- Dosthill Primary School, Tamworth
- Dove Bank Primary School, Kidsgrove
- Dove CE Academy, Uttoxeter
- Doxey Primary School, Doxey
- Dunstall Park Primary School, Tamworth
- Edge Hill Academy, Stapenhill
- Ellison Primary Academy, Wolstanton
- Endon Hall Primary School, Endon
- Etching Hill CE Primary Academy, Rugeley
- Eton Park Junior, Burton upon Trent
- The Faber RC Primary School, Cotton
- Featherstone Academy, Featherstone
- Five Spires Academy, Lichfield
- Five Ways Primary School, Heath Hayes
- Flash Ley Primary School, Stafford
- Flax Hill Junior Academy, Tamworth
- Florendine Primary School, Amington
- Foley Infant School Academy, Kinver
- Forest Hills Primary School, Rugeley
- Forsbrook CE Primary School, Blythe Bridge
- Fradley Park Primary School, Fradley
- Fulfen Primary School, Burntwood
- Fulford Primary School, Fulford
- Gentleshaw Primary Academy, Gentleshaw
- Glascote Academy, Tamworth
- Glenthorne Community Primary School, Cheslyn Hay
- Gnosall St Lawrence CE Primary Academy, Gnosall
- Gorsemoor Primary School, Heath Hayes
- Grange School, Burton upon Trent
- Great Wood Community Primary School, Upper Tean
- Green Lea First School, Milwich
- Greysbrooke Primary School, Shenstone
- Hanbury's Farm Community Primary School, Tamworth
- Hassell Primary School, Newcastle-under-Lyme
- Haughton St Giles CE Primary Academy, Haughton
- Havergal CE Primary School, Shareshill
- Hayes Meadow Primary School, Handsacre
- Hazel Slade Primary Academy, Hazelslade
- Heath Hayes Primary Academy, Heath Hayes
- Heathfields Infant Academy, Tamworth
- Hempstalls Primary School, Newcastle-under-Lyme
- Henhurst Ridge Primary Academy, Burton upon Trent
- Henry Chadwick Primary School, Rugeley
- Highfields Primary Academy, Burntwood
- Hob Hill CE/Methodist Primary School, Brereton
- Hollinsclough CE Academy, Hollinsclough
- Holly Grove Primary Academy, Burntwood
- Holy Rosary RC Voluntary Academy, Burton upon Trent
- Holy Trinity CE Primary School, Burton upon Trent
- Horninglow Primary, Burton upon Trent
- Horton St Michael's CE First School, Horton
- The Howard Primary School, Elford
- Hugo Meynell CE Primary School, Loggerheads
- Hutchinson Memorial CE First School, Checkley
- Ilam CE Primary School, Ilam
- Jerome Primary School, Norton Canes
- The John Bamford Primary School, Rugeley
- John of Rolleston Primary School, Rolleston on Dove
- John Wheeldon Primary Academy, Stafford
- Kidsgrove Primary School, Kidsgrove
- Kingsfield First School, Biddulph
- Knutton St Marys CE Academy, Knutton
- Knypersley First School, Biddulph
- Lakeside Primary School, Tamworth
- Landau Forte Academy Greenacres, Amington
- Landywood Primary School, Landywood
- Lane Green First School, Bilbrook
- Langdale Primary School, Newcastle-under-Lyme
- Lansdowne, Burton upon Trent
- Lark Hall Infant Academy, Tamworth
- Leasowes Primary School, Stafford
- Leek First School, Leek
- Little Aston Primary Academy, Little Aston
- Littleton Green Community School, Huntington
- Longford Primary Academy, Cannock
- Longwood Primary School, Fazeley
- Manifold CE Primary School, Warslow
- Manor Hill First School, Walton
- Manor Primary Academy, Drayton Bassett
- Marshbrook First School, Penkridge
- Mary Howard CE Primary School, Tamworth
- May Bank Infants' School, Newcastle-under-Lyme
- The Meadows Primary School, Madeley Heath
- Meir Heath Academy, Meir Heath
- Millfield Primary School, Fazeley
- Moat Hall Primary Academy, Great Wyrley
- Moor First School, Biddulph Moor
- Moorgate Primary Academy, Tamworth
- Moorhill Primary School, Cannock
- The Mosley Academy, Anslow
- Needwood CE Primary School, Newborough
- Norton Canes Primary Academy, Norton Canes
- Oakhill Primary School, Tamworth
- Oakridge Primary School, Stafford
- Oulton CE First School, Oulton
- Our Lady and St Werburghs RC Primary School, Newcastle-under-Lyme
- Our Lady of Grace RC Academy, Biddulph
- Outwoods Primary School, Burton upon Trent
- Oxhey First School, Biddulph
- Parkside Primary School, Stafford
- Perton First School, Perton
- Perton Primary Academy, Perton
- Picknalls First School, Uttoxeter
- Pirehill First School, Walton
- Poppyfield Primary Academy, Hednesford
- Princefield First School, Penkridge
- Pye Green Academy, Hednesford
- Ravensmead Primary School, Bignall End
- Redbrook Hayes Community Primary School, Rugeley
- Redhill Primary School, Chadsmoor
- The Reginald Mitchell Primary School, Butt Lane
- The Richard Clarke First School, Abbots Bromley
- The Richard Crosse CE Primary School, Kings Bromley
- Richard Wakefield CE Primary Academy, Tutbury
- Ridgeway Primary Academy, Burntwood
- Riverview Primary School, Burton upon Trent
- Rowley Park Primary Academy, Stafford
- Rushton CE First School, Rushton Spencer
- Rykneld Primary School, Branston
- St Andrew's CE Primary School, Clifton Campville
- St Andrew's CE Primary School, Weston
- St Anne's CE Primary School, Brown Edge
- St Anne's RC Primary School, Stafford
- St Augustine's CE Academy, Draycott in the Clay
- St Austin's RC Primary School, Stafford
- St Bartholomew's CE School, Longnor
- St Benedict Biscop CE Primary School, Wombourne
- St Bernadette's RC Primary School, Wombourne
- St Chad's CE Primary School, Lichfield
- St Chad's CE Primary School, Pattingham
- St Chad's CE Primary School, Red Street
- St Christopher's RC Primary Academy, Codsall
- St Dominic's RC Primary School, Stone
- St Edward's CE Academy, Cheddleton
- St Elizabeth's RC Primary School, Tamworth
- St Filumena's RC Primary School, Blythe Bridge
- St Gabriel's RC Primary School, Tamworth
- St Giles and St George's CE Academy, Newcastle-under-Lyme
- St Giles' RC Primary School, Cheadle
- St James CE Primary Academy, Longdon
- St John the Evangelist RC Primary, Kidsgrove
- St John's CE First School, Bishops Wood
- St John's CE Primary Academy, Stafford
- St John's CE Primary School, Keele
- St John's CE Primary School, Swindon
- St John's CE Primary School, Wetley Rocks
- St John's Primary Academy, Essington
- St John's RC Primary School, Great Haywood
- St Joseph and St Theresa RC Primary, Burntwood
- St Joseph's RC Primary School, Hednesford
- St Joseph's RC Primary School, Lichfield
- St Joseph's RC Primary School, Rugeley
- St Joseph's RC Primary School, Uttoxeter
- St Leonard's CE First School, Dunston
- St Leonard's CE First School, Ipstones
- St Leonard's CE Primary School, Wigginton
- St Leonard's Primary School, Stafford
- St Luke's CE Academy, Endon
- St Luke's CE Primary School, Cannock
- St Luke's CE Primary School, Silverdale
- St Margaret's CE Junior School, Wolstanton
- St Mary and St Chad CofE First School, Brewood
- St Mary's CE First Academy, Wheaton Aston
- St Mary's CE First School, Uttoxeter
- The St Mary's CE Primary School, Colton
- St Mary's CE Primary School, Market Drayton
- St Mary's RC Academy, Leek
- St Mary's RC Primary School, Brewood
- St Mary's RC Primary School, Cannock
- St Mary's RC Primary School, Newcastle-under-Lyme
- St Michael's CE First School, Penkridge
- St Michael's CE First School, Stone
- St Michael's CE Primary School, Lichfield
- St Modwen's RC Primary School, Horninglow
- St Nicholas CE First School, Codsall
- St Patrick's RC Primary School, Stafford
- St Paul's CE First School, Coven
- St Paul's CE Primary School, Stafford
- St Peter's CE Academy Alton
- St Peter's CE First School, Marchington
- St Peter's CE Primary Academy, Hednesford
- St Peter's CE Primary Academy, Stonnall
- St Peter's CE Primary School, Caverswall
- St Peter's CE Primary School, Hixon
- St Saviour's CE Academy, Talke
- St Stephen's Primary School, Fradley
- St Thomas' CE Primary Academy, Kidsgrove
- St Thomas' RC Primary School, Tean
- St Thomas More RC Primary School, Great Wyrley
- St Werburgh's CE Primary School, Kingsley
- St Wulstan's RC Primary School, Wolstanton
- Ss Peter and Paul RC Primary School, Lichfield
- Scientia Academy, Burton upon Trent
- Scotch Orchard Primary School, Lichfield
- Seabridge Primary School, Newcastle-under-Lyme
- Shobnall Primary School, Burton upon Trent
- Silkmore Primary Academy, Stafford
- Silverdale Primary Academy, Silverdale
- Sir John Offley CE Primary School, Madeley
- Springcroft Primary School, Blythe Bridge
- Springfields First School, Yarnfield
- Springhead Primary School, Talke Pits
- Springhill Primary Academy, Burntwood
- Squirrel Hayes First School, Biddulph
- Stoneydelph Primary School, Wilnecote
- Streethay Primary School, Lichfield
- Sun Academy Bradwell, Newcastle-under-Lyme
- Talbot First School, Kingstone
- Thomas Barnes Primary School, Hopwas
- Thomas Russell Infants School, Barton-under-Needwood
- Thomas Russell Junior School, Barton-under-Needwood
- Three Peaks Primary Academy, Wilnecote
- Thursfield Primary School, Harriseahead
- Tillington Manor Primary School, Stafford
- Tittensor CE First School, Tittensor
- Tower View Primary School, Winshill
- Two Gates Primary School, Tamworth
- Tynsel Parkes Primary Academy, Uttoxeter
- The Valley Primary School, Oakamoor
- Veritas Primary Academy, Stafford
- Victoria Community School, Burton upon Trent
- The Violet Way Academy, Burton upon Trent
- Waterhouses CE Primary Academy, Waterhouses
- Werrington Primary School, Werrington
- West Hill Primary School, Hednesford
- Westfield Primary School, Wombourne
- Westlands Primary School, Newcastle-under-Lyme
- Westwood First School, Leek
- Whittington Primary School, Whittington
- The William Amory Primary School, Blythe Bridge
- William MacGregor Primary School, Tamworth
- William Shrewsbury Primary School, Stretton
- Willows Primary School, Lichfield
- Wilnecote Junior Academy, Wilnecote
- Winshill Village Primary School, Winshill
- Wood Lane Primary School, Bignall End
- Woodcroft Academy, Leek
- The Woodlands Community Primary School, Tamworth
- Woodseaves CE Primary Academy, Woodseaves
- Yoxall St Peter's CE Primary School, Yoxall

=== Middle schools ===
- Bilbrook CE Middle School, Codsall
- Brewood CE Middle Academy, Brewood
- Christ Church Academy, Stone
- Churnet View Middle School, Leek
- Codsall Middle School, Codsall
- James Bateman Middle School, Biddulph
- Oldfields Hall Middle School, Uttoxeter
- Penkridge Middle School, Penkridge
- Perton Middle School, Perton
- Ryecroft CE Middle School, Rocester
- St Edward's CE Academy, Leek
- Walton Priory Middle School, Walton
- Windsor Park Middle School, Uttoxeter
- Woodhouse Academy, Biddulph

=== Secondary schools ===
- Abbot Beyne School, Burton upon Trent
- Alleyne's Academy, Stone
- Biddulph High School, Biddulph
- Blessed Robert Sutton Catholic Voluntary Academy, Burton upon Trent
- Blessed William Howard Catholic School, Stafford
- Blythe Bridge High School, Blythe Bridge
- Cannock Chase High School, Cannock
- Cardinal Griffin Catholic College, Cannock
- Chase Terrace Academy, Burntwood
- The Cheadle Academy, Cheadle
- Cheslyn Hay Academy, Cheslyn Hay
- Chesterton Community Sports College, Chesterton
- Clayton Hall Academy, Newcastle-under-Lyme
- Codsall Community High School, Codsall
- The de Ferrers Academy, Burton upon Trent
- Endon High School, Endon
- Erasmus Darwin Academy, Burntwood
- The Friary School, Lichfield
- Great Wyrley Academy, Great Wyrley
- The Hart School, Rugeley
- JCB Academy, Rocester
- John Taylor Free School, Tatenhill
- John Taylor High School, Barton-under-Needwood
- Kidsgrove Secondary School, Kidsgrove
- King Edward VI High School, Stafford
- King Edward VI School, Lichfield
- The King's Church of England Academy, Kidsgrove
- Kingsmead School, Hednesford
- Kinver High School, Kinver
- Landau Forte Academy Amington, Amington
- Landau Forte Academy QEMS, Tamworth
- Leek High School, Leek
- Madeley High School, Madeley
- Moorside High School, Werrington
- Nether Stowe School, Lichfield
- Newcastle Academy, Newcastle-under-Lyme
- Norton Canes High School, Norton Canes
- The Orme Academy, Newcastle-under-Lyme
- Paget High School, Branston
- Painsley Catholic College, Cheadle
- Paulet High School, Burton upon Trent
- The Rawlett School, Tamworth
- The Rural Enterprise Academy, Penkridge
- St John Fisher Catholic College, Newcastle-under-Lyme
- Sir Graham Balfour School, Stafford
- Sir Thomas Boughey Academy, Halmer End
- Stafford Manor High School, Stafford
- Staffordshire University Academy, Hednesford
- Tamworth Enterprise College, Tamworth
- Thomas Alleyne's High School, Uttoxeter
- Walton High School, Walton-on-the-Hill
- Weston Road Academy, Stafford
- Westwood College, Leek
- The Wilnecote School, Wilnecote
- Wolgarston High School, Penkridge
- Wombourne High School, Wombourne

=== Special and alternative schools ===
- Bailey Street Alternative Provision Academy, Stafford
- Blackfriars Academy, Newcastle-under-Lyme
- The Bridge Academy, Lichfield
- Burton PRU, Burton upon Trent
- Cedars Short Stay School, Knutton
- Chaselea Alternative Provision Academy, Cannock
- Chasetown Community School, Chasetown
- Cherry Trees School, Wombourne
- Cicely Haughton School, Wetley Rocks
- Coppice Academy, Newcastle-under-Lyme
- The Fountains High School, Stretton
- The Fountains Primary School, Stretton
- Greenhall, Stafford
- Hednesford Valley High School, Hednesford
- Horton Lodge Community Special School, Rudyard
- Kettlebrook Short Stay School, Tamworth
- Loxley Hall School, Uttoxeter
- Marshlands School, Stafford
- The Meadows School, Leek
- Merryfields School, Newcastle-under-Lyme
- Queens Croft High School, Lichfield
- Rocklands School, Lichfield
- Saxon Hill Academy, Lichfield
- Shenstone Lodge School, Shenstone*
- Sherbrook Primary School, Cannock
- Springfield School, Leek
- Two Rivers High School, Tamworth
- Two Rivers Primary School, Tamworth
- Walton Hall Academy, Eccleshall
- Wightwick Hall School, Compton

*This school is located in Staffordshire, but is for pupils from Sandwell

=== Further education ===
- Burton & South Derbyshire College
- Buxton & Leek College
- Landau Forte Academy Tamworth Sixth Form
- Moorlands Sixth Form College
- Newcastle-under-Lyme College
- South Staffordshire College
- Stafford College
- Stafford Collegiate

== Independent schools ==
=== Primary and preparatory schools ===
- Demetae Academy, Newcastle-under-Lyme
- Edenhurst Preparatory School, Newcastle-under-Lyme
- Yarlet School, Yarlet

=== Senior and all-through schools ===
- Chase Grammar School, Cannock
- Denstone College, Denstone
- Lichfield Cathedral School, Lichfield
- Newcastle-under-Lyme School, Newcastle-under-Lyme
- St Dominic's Grammar School, Brewood
- St Dominic's Priory School, Stone
- Stafford Grammar School, Stafford

=== Special and alternative schools ===
- Aurora Hanley School, Abbey Hulton
- Bluebell School, Kidsgrove
- Compass Community School Staffordshire, Cauldon
- Draycott Moor College, Draycott in the Moors
- Elm House School, Cheadle
- Evergreen, Ipstones
- The Haven School, Stafford
- Heather Field School, Stafford
- Hopedale School, Cheddleton
- Huntercombe Hospital School Stafford, Wheaton Aston
- JP Alternative Education, Rugeley
- Kaleidoscope School, Wolstanton
- Longdon Hall School, Longdon Green
- Longridge School, Penkridge
- Lyme Brook Independent School, Newcastle-under-Lyme
- Maple Hayes Hall School, Lichfield
- Options Trent Acres School, Kings Bromley
- Pace Education, Newcastle-under-Lyme
- Parkgate Farm, Ipstones
- Peak Education, Audley
- Peak Education, Cannock
- Peak Education, Gailey
- Roaches School, Biddulph
- Rugeley School, Blithbury
- Stepping Stones School, Tamworth
