= Landau Forte =

Landau Forte qems

== Educational Institutions ==
- Landau Forte Academy QEMS, an 11-16 academy on Ashby Road in the North of Tamworth, Staffordshire (formerly Queen Elizabeth's Mercian School)
- Landau Forte Academy Amington, an 11-16 academy in Amington, in the North-East of Tamworth, Staffordshire (formerly Landau Forte Academy Tamworth, and before that Woodhouse Business and Enterprise College and Woodhouse High School)
- Landau Forte Academy Tamworth Sixth Form, a 16-19 academy on Ashby Road in the North of Tamworth, Staffordshire, adjacent to Landau Forte Academy QEMS.
- Landau Forte College, an 11-19 academy in Derby, Derbyshire
