= Clayton Hall Academy =

Location
- Clayton Lane; Clayton; Newcastle-under-Lyme, Staffordshire, ST5 3DN; England; 52°59′20″N 2°13′08″W

Information
- Type: Academy
- Local authority: Staffordshire
- Department for Education URN: 142278 Tables
- Ofsted: Reports
- Head teacher: Catherine Reid
- Staff: 143
- Gender: Mixed
- Age: 11 to 16
- Enrolment: 907
- Houses: Integrity, Valour, Ambition, Determination
- Website: https://www.claytonhallacademy.org/

Clayton Hall Academy is a mixed secondary school located in the Clayton area of Newcastle-under-Lyme in the English county of Staffordshire.

== History ==
The present Clayton Hall, which is used as part of the college, is at least the third Hall on or near the current site. There was a Hall on Clayton Road where Barn Court is currently situated. This belonged to the Lovatt Family, local landowners at the time. The second Hall was opposite the Nuffield Hospital, it eventually belonged to Mary Lovatt Booth, the sole survivor of the Lovatt and Booth families. She was a local heiress and married John Ayshford Wise in 1837. The Hall and the family are featured in John Ward's book, Stoke-upon-Trent of 1842.

The family did not live at Clayton Hall, as it was a little run down at the time. They had a new Hall built on the present site as newlyweds. To provide more private grounds Clayton Lane was moved to its present position, however, it originally ran through the College grounds. The Hall appeared to be occupied by the family by November 1841. Their elder daughter planted a tree near the drive, and there is still a plaque there now. The family was not living in the Hall at the time of the April 1841 Census. John Ayshford Wise and his wife were wealthy landowners and had three children.

Behind the Hall were separate laundry rooms, a stable and a coach house, and food storage areas for fresh produce from the estate. The orchard dates from this time. By 1891, when the Hall was put up for sale, a single storey Billiard Room had been built. This is the present Library. The ceilings in this area are highly decorated with papier-mâché and pierced coving, and the rooms that were used by the family have chimney breasts for open fires.

The Hall was used as a family home for nearly one hundred years until 1939. It was then taken over during the Second World War as a training base for Fleet Air-Arm apprentices, and extra outbuildings built. Only the gymnasium, chapel and minibus garage remain from this time. The Hall was painted in camouflage during the war time. It was used as a training camp, for the Royal Navy. This was a land based unit, a 'stone frigate' and named HMS Daedalus II.

=== Grammar school ===
The Hall and the wartime buildings became part of Clayton Hall Grammar School for Girls in 1947. This was administered by the Borough of Newcastle-under-Lyme. It had around 500 girls in the 1950s, then 600 in the 1960s.

=== Comprehensive ===
It became a mixed comprehensive school, Clayton High School, in 1978. It subsequently lost its sixth form in 1987.The main teaching block and assembly hall were built in 1963, the technology block in 1978, the mobiles in 1987 and the sports hall in 1995. In 1997, the school won a grant of £60,000 to restore a historic garden wall which was originally built in 1840. Once it was restored, the public were invited to attend a ceremony performed by the Education chairman, Councillor John Brooks.

=== Specialist school and academy status ===
In 2005, the school became a Specialist School, specialising in Business & Enterprise and Languages. The school changed its name from Clayton High School to Clayton Hall Business and Language College. Due to this status, unlike many other schools, a language at GCSE is compulsory.

In 2010 the school became a key partner in the South Newcastle Federation, which shares governance and leadership with NCHS The Science College. This partnership brings many benefits for both schools including shared teaching expertise & resources, a stronger leadership team, cost savings and increasingly varied option choices at Key Stage 4.

Previously a foundation school administered by Staffordshire County Council, Clayton Hall Business and Language College converted to academy status in October 2015 and was renamed Clayton Hall Academy. The school is now sponsored by the Windsor Academy Trust, who have many schools across the UK.

== Admissions ==
If the school receives more applications for admission than have been planned for, places are allocated according to the guidelines laid down by the Local Education Authority. It is an 11–16 mixed comprehensive of about 1000 students and around 100 staff.

== Location ==
The school is based around a Grade II listed building referred to as The Old Hall. The rest of the school comprises a mixture of buildings dating from 1940 to 2007. It is situated in a residential area, on the east of the A519 in the south of Newcastle-under-Lyme, next to the church of St James the Great.

== Academia ==
=== Academic results ===
The school has a strong record of academic achievement at GCSE level. This is likely due to a strong teaching staff, with James Paxton working at the school for over forty years.

=== House System ===
The academy has a "House" system with four houses within Clayton Hall:

- Valour
- Integrity
- Determination
- Ambition

=== Subjects ===
A wide range of subjects are offered from Engineering to Performing Arts. For current courses please refer to the website.

== Notable former pupils ==
- Greg Butler (swimmer) - (born 2000) British Swimmer
- Eddie Hall – (born 1987) World's Strongest Man 2017
- Curtis Nelson – (born 1993) Cardiff City footballer
- Wes Nelson - (born 1998) Love Island contestant and reality TV star
- Jake Shakeshaft – (born 1995) Contestant on Eurovision 2016 and The Voice
- Lewis Dobbin - (born 2003) Aston Villa footballer

=== Clayton Hall Grammar School ===
- Lynne Sedgmore, former executive director of the 157 Group (now the Collab Group)
