= Blackfriars school =

Blackfriars school may refer to:

- Blackfriars Academy, Staffordshire, England
- Blackfriars Priory School, South Australia
- Llanarth Court, in Monmouthshire, Wales, which ran as Blackfriars School c.1948-1967.
