= Coulman =

Coulman may refer to:

- Coulman Island, an island of Victoria Land, Antarctica
- Mike Coulman (1944–2023), English rugby league and rugby union player
