= Shani Dhanda =

British disability activist

- Born: Birmingham, England
- Employer: Virgin Media
- Height: 3 ft 10 in (117 cm)
- Awards: Shaw Trust Power List, BBC's 100 Women (In 2020), Future Face of Greater Birmingham

Shani Dhanda (c. 1988) is a British disability activist. She was named to the BBC's 100 Women in 2020 and has been named to the Shaw Trust Power 100 on several occasions, earning the title of the UK's most influential disabled person in 2023. Dhanda founded the Asian Disability Network and helped organise the first-ever Asian Woman Festival in the UK.

== Early life and education ==
Dhanda's mother was a second generation immigrant and her father was a first generation immigrant in the UK, both from Punjab, Northern India. She was born in Birmingham, UK. When she was two years-old Dhanda was diagnosed with Brittle Bone Disease (Osteogenesis Imperfecta), causing her bones to frequently break. Dhanda broke her legs 14 times by the age of sixteen.

As a child, Dhanda and her family attended a local Gurdwara.

Dhanda worked for three years while studying to achieve her degree in events management. Dhanda was named the Future Face of Greater Birmingham at the sixth Future Faces Chamber of Commerce annual awards in 2020, receiving a fully funded place at Aston University to achieve her Master of Business.

== Career ==
As a 16-year-old, Dhanda applied to over 100 roles and was rejected from every one. She claims this was due to her disability.

Dhanda founded an events management company and worked on events for Tyson Fury, Floyd Mayweather and Anthony Joshua. She has also worked for Virgin Media as a disability program manager. She founded the Asian Disability Network and the first Asian Woman Festival in Birmingham.

Dhanda has also developed and launched Diversability Card, a discount card for people with disabilities.

For her work, Dhanda was recognised as one of the UK's most influential disabled people by the annual The Shaw Trust Power List, and as one of BBC's 100 inspiring and influential women from around the world for 2020.

In 2020, Dhanda was featured in an interview with BritishVogue about activism and her part within that movement.

In 2021, she featured in LinkedIn's largest UK advertising campaign, Dhanda's first television advert gained her the title of LinkedIn Changemaker.

In December 2021 and March 2022, she appeared as a guest panellist on ITV's Loose Women.

In February 2022, Dhanda delivered a TED (conference) talk in London, sharing how to make inclusion everyone's responsibility and discussing Diversity and Equity as a personal responsibility.

== Disability advocacy ==
Dhanda is a former trustee of Leonard Cheshire Disability.

On 7 March 2022, to mark International Women's Day, Scope announced Dhanda as an ambassador for the charity.
