= Landau Forte Academy Tamworth Sixth Form =

Location
- Ashby Road; Tamworth, Staffordshire, B79 8AA; England
- Coordinates: 52.640669°N 1.691420°W

Information
- Type: Sixth form; Academy
- Motto: Pursuing Education Excellence
- Established: 1 September 2011
- Department for Education URN: 141491 Tables
- Ofsted: Reports
- Head Teacher: K Adams
- Gender: Coeducational
- Age: 16 to 19
- Enrolment: 552
- Website: http://www.lfatsf.org.uk/

Landau Forte Academy Tamworth Sixth Form is a Sixth form centre and academy situated in Tamworth, Staffordshire, England.

== History ==
The Sixth form was founded in November 2011 and was converted to an academy on 1 August 2013 by the Landau Forte Charitable Trust. The trust has opened several schools in the area, such as Landau Forte Academy QEMS and Landau Forte Academy Amington.

An Ofsted report in April 2015 said that the Sixth form 'requires improvement'. In September 2018, the most recent Ofsted inspection rated the Sixth Form as 'Good'.
