= Michael Knight (RAF officer) =

British Royal Air Force air marshal (1932–2022)

Sir Michael Knight
- Born: 23 November 1932; Longsdon, Staffordshire England
- Died: 28 November 2022 (aged 90); Mortehoe, Devon, England
- Military career
- Allegiance: United Kingdom
- Branch: Royal Air Force
- Service years: 1953–89
- Rank: Air Chief Marshal
- Commands: Air Member for Supply and Organisation (1983–85); No. 1 Group (1980–82)
- Awards: Knight Commander of the Order of the Bath; Air Force Cross

Air Chief Marshal Sir Michael William Patrick Knight, KCB, AFC (23 November 1932 – 28 November 2022) was a notable British Royal Air Force and Cold War NATO commander who was also known for various charitable projects including the Royal International Air Tattoo and the Vulcan to the Sky cause.

== Early life ==
Knight was born in Longsdon, near Leek, Staffordshire, on 23 November 1932. He was educated at Leek High School, then studied English Language at the University of Liverpool, where he joined the University Air Squadron. After his graduation, he began his National Service and finished his training as a pilot.

== RAF career ==
Knight joined the Royal Air Force in 1953. He was appointed Air Officer Commanding No. 1 Group in 1980, Air Member for Supply and Organisation in 1983 and UK Military Representative to NATO in 1986. He retired in 1989. He later served as chairman of Vulcan to the Sky, a project that returned a vintage Avro Vulcan XH558 to airworthiness and flight, chairman of the Air League, chairman of Cobham plc and founding chairman of the Royal International Air Tattoo.

== Personal life and death ==
In 1967, he married Patricia Ann Davies; they had one son, Richard, and two daughters, Gillian and Lisa. Knight enjoyed rugby - serving as the Royal Air Force representative on the Rugby Football Union (RFU) - and music, particularly jazz.

Knight died from heart failure at his home in Mortehoe, North Devon, on 28 November 2022, five days after his family had gathered to celebrate his 90th birthday. A lone Hawker Hunter fighter jet overflew his funeral in Mortehoe.

Military offices
Preceded by David Craig	Air Officer Commanding No. 1 Group; 1980–1982	Succeeded by David Parry-Evans
Preceded by Sir John Rogers	Air Member for Supply and Organisation; 1983–1985	Succeeded by Sir Michael Armitage
Preceded by Sir Thomas Morony	UK Military Representative to NATO; 1986–1989	Succeeded by Sir Richard Thomas
