= Chesterton Community Sports College =

Coordinates: 53.0384°N 2.2537°W

Location
- Castle Street; Chesterton; Newcastle-under-Lyme, Staffordshire, ST5 7LP; England

Information
- Type: Academy
- Local authority: Staffordshire County Council
- Trust: Collective Vision Trust
- Department for Education URN: 140470 Tables
- Ofsted: Reports
- Headteacher: Robert Swindells
- Gender: Coeducational
- Age: 11 to 16
- Website: https://www.ccsc.staffs.sch.uk/

Chesterton Community Sports College is a coeducational secondary school and specialist sports college located in the Chesterton area of Newcastle-under-Lyme, Staffordshire, England. Feeder schools include Chesterton Primary, Crackley Bank, Churchfields Primary and St. Chads'.

== History ==
It is on the site of Chesterton Castle.

In 2006 Molly Simpson introduced music and drama into the curriculum. The school also has a full-time music teacher and a full-time drama teacher. CCSC has recently gained their best GCSE Results yet.

Previously a community school administered by Staffordshire County Council, in December 2013 Chesterton Community Sports College converted to academy status. The school is now sponsored by the Collective Vision Trust.

== Lessons ==
All pupils have twelve half-hour periods a day, which include: Maths, English, Science, PHSCE (which happens during form), PE, RMS, Geography, Art, Technology, Music, Food Technology, Art, History and Computer Science. From Year 9 on students take their GCSE options, which introduce lessons like: GCSE Dance, GCSE ICT and many more.

== Resources ==
The school has a library, hall stage, astro-turf football pitch and sports hall. There are also neo-culture technology rooms, a music room and a drama room. Students have their own personal tablet computers provided by the school when they start (these use the Office 360 applications).
