= Geoffrey Bullough =

English literary scholar (1901–1982)

- Born: 27 January 1901; Prestwich
- Died: 12 February 1982 (aged 81)
- Occupation: Literary scholar
- Notable work: Philosophical Poems of Henry More Comprising Psychozoia and Minor Poems (1931), The Trend of Modern Poetry (1934; 2nd ed., 1949), Narrative and Dramatic Sources of Shakespeare (1957), Mirror of Minds (1962), Shakespeare the Elizabethan (1963), Poems and Dramas by Fulke Greville (1939), The Oxford Book of Seventeenth-Century Verse (1951, with H. J. C. Grierson), Milton's Dramatic Poems (with Margaret Bullough, 1958), and Luís de Camões's The Lusiads (1964)

Geoffrey Bullough, FBA, FKC (27 January 1901 – 12 February 1982) was an English literary scholar.

== Early life and education ==
Bullough was born in Prestwich on 27 January 1901 and attended the Stand Grammar School before reading English at the University of Manchester. He graduated with first-class honours in 1922. The following year, he was awarded an MA (his thesis on Walter Pater being supervised by H. B. Charlton) and a teaching diploma.

== Career ==
Bullough held the John Bright Fellowship in English Literature from 1923 to 1924. In the latter year, he joined the staff of Queen Elizabeth's Grammar School in Tamworth as a schoolmaster. He worked there until 1926, when he was appointed to an assistant lectureship in English literature at the University of Manchester; in 1929, he moved to the University of Edinburgh to take up a full lectureship. During his time at Edinburgh, he published Philosophical Poems of Henry More Comprising Psychozoia and Minor Poems (1931). He was then Professor of English Literature at the University of Sheffield from 1933 to 1946, and Professor of English Language and Literature at King's College London from 1946 to 1968. During this period, he wrote The Trend of Modern Poetry (1934; 2nd ed., 1949), Narrative and Dramatic Sources of Shakespeare (1957), Mirror of Minds (1962) and Shakespeare the Elizabethan (1963). He also edited Poems and Dramas by Fulke Greville (1939), The Oxford Book of Seventeenth-Century Verse (1951, with H. J. C. Grierson), Milton's Dramatic Poems (with Margaret Bullough, 1958), and Luís de Camões's The Lusiads (1964).

Bullough was elected a fellow of King's College London in 1964 and of the British Academy in 1966. He was a visiting professor at Cornell University (1954) and at Johns Hopkins University (1966). He delivered the Warton Lecture at the British Academy (1955), the Alexander Lecture at the University of Toronto in 1959 and the Shakespeare Lecture at the British Academy in 1964; he received four honorary doctorates in 1969. He died on 12 February 1982.
