= Peter Turnbull (cricketer) =

Welsh cricketer (born 1989)

Personal information
- Full name: Peter Thomas Turnbull
- Born: 20 May 1989 (age 37); Pontypridd, Glamorgan, Wales
- Batting: Right-handed
- Bowling: Right-arm medium-fast

Domestic team information
- Years: Team
- 2009–2010: Suffolk
- 2009–2012: Cambridge UCCE/MCCU

Career statistics
Competition	First-class
Matches	9
Runs scored	88
Batting average	8.80
100s/50s	–/–
Top score	33
Balls bowled	1,706
Wickets	31
Bowling average	31.00
5 wickets in innings	2
10 wickets in match	–
Best bowling	6/108
Catches/stumpings	1/–
- Source: Cricinfo, 13 July 2019

Peter Thomas Turnbull (born 20 May 1989) is a Welsh former first-class cricketer.

Tunbull was born at Pontypridd. He was educated in Stafford at the Blessed William Howard Catholic School, before going up to Anglia Ruskin University. While studying at Anglia Ruskin, he made his debut in first-class cricket for Cambridge UCCE against Essex at Fenner's in 2009. He played first-class cricket for Cambridge (known as Cambridge MCCU from 2010) until 2012, making nine appearances. Playing as a right-arm medium-fast bowler, he took 31 wickets at an average of 31.00, with best figures of 6 for 108. These figures, one of two five wicket hauls he took, came against Lancashire in 2012. In addition to playing first-class cricket, Turnbull also played minor counties cricket for Suffolk in 2009 and 2010, making five appearances in the Minor Counties Championship and four appearances in the MCCA Knockout Trophy.
