= Ash Bank =

Village in Staffordshire, England

Coordinates: 53.0229°N 2.1050°W

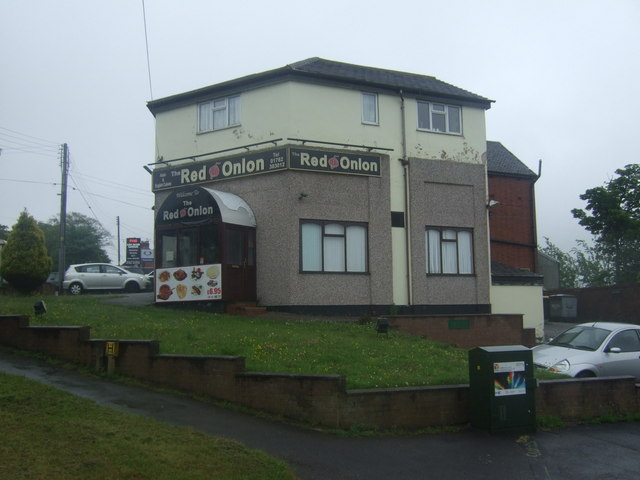
- The Red Onion restaurant

- Location within Staffordshire
- OS grid reference: SK8069
- Civil parish: Werrington
- District: Staffordshire Moorlands
- Shire county: Staffordshire
- Region: West Midlands
- Country: England
- Sovereign state: United Kingdom
- Post town: Stoke-on-Trent
- Postcode district: ST9
- Police: Staffordshire
- Fire: Staffordshire
- Ambulance: West Midlands
- UK Parliament: Stoke-on-Trent

Ash Bank is a village in the civil parish of Werrington, in the Staffordshire Moorlands district, in Staffordshire, England, near to Stoke-on-Trent. Located in the village is Ash Hall, on Ash Bank Road, and "The Ash" (a combination of Ash House also known as Ash Farm house located on Ash Farm together with other buildings on farm Land) on the opposite side of the road. The estate is split by Ash Bank Road. In the 1830s a mansion was built by Broad Street Pottery Works owner, Job Meigh. A two-storey house in Tudor style, it is a Grade II listed building, as is the single-storey lodge which accompanies it. Ash Hall obtained planning permissions to repurpose Ash bank Hotel, which became a nursing home and build ten new homes and a golf course. There was a piece of land on Ash Bank Road It is now used as a nursing home for the elderly.
