= HM Prison Werrington =

Male juveniles' prison in Werrington in Staffordshire, England

HMYOI Werrington
- Interactive map of HMYOI Werrington
- Location: Werrington, Staffordshire; 53.0229°N 2.0871°W
- Security class: Male Juveniles
- Population: 118 (December 2019)
- Opened: 1957
- Managed by: HM Prison Services
- Governor: Jasmin Steadman
- Website: Werrington at justice.gov.uk

HMYOI Werrington (also known as Werrington Juvenile Centre) is a male juveniles' prison located in the village of Werrington in Staffordshire, England. The prison is operated by His Majesty's Prison Service.

== History ==
Werrington opened in 1895 as an industrial school. Prison Commissioners purchased the establishment in 1955, and converted it into a Senior Detention Centre in 1957. Werrington then became a Youth Custody Centre in 1985, after implementation of the Criminal Justice Act 1982. In 1988 it was converted into a Juvenile Prison, its current role.

In September 1998, an inspection report from HM Chief Inspector of Prisons criticised Werrington for being unsuitable for 15 to 17-year-old inmates, stating that conditions at the prison were akin those in adult jails. The report criticised the prison for converting its dormitory-style accommodation into double-occupancy cells, and for prisoners having their meals in their cells rather than using the communal dining rooms. Inadequate medical cover for some prisoners, and the sports hall's poor facilities were also highlighted.

In March 2003, the Prison Reform Trust highlighted Werrington Prison for its high turnover of governors. The trust noted that Werrington had employed four governors in five years, and that such arrangements would not be allowed in schools or hospitals. The trust also singled out the high levels of prison officers' sickness at the jail.

In September 2007, the Howard League for Penal Reform claimed that inmates at Werrington were being forcibly strip searched. It was reported that on one occasion, a prisoner had his clothing cut off whilst undergoing a search. However the league noted that the prison had improved in other areas.

An inspection report published in June 2019 found "many positives" but had "become less safe over the year since its last inspection".

A September 2022 visit, following up on a report at the start of the year, found that "HMYOI Werrington was still struggling to manage behaviour and provide a purposeful regime for children" and that "it was a very violent place where conflict and poor behaviour management led to children being locked up for far too long and often unable to access education or other interventions".

As of 2026, the most recent report, published July 2025, saw improvement since 2023 in safety from "poor" to "not sufficiently good", with 20% of children reporting feeling unsafe and only 34% feeling "cared for by staff", "whose time was largely taken up with managing the separation of those who had to be kept apart for safety reasons".

== The prison today ==
Werrington is a juvenile centre for males aged from 15 to 18. Full-time and part-time education courses are provided as part of the prison's regime, as are vocational training workshops in creative design, music and radio, barista, catering, painting and decorating, tiling, plastering, barbering, sports studies, ICT.

The young people also have regular sessions delivered by Kinetic youth workers.

Physical education is offered to inmates throughout the week, evenings and weekends.

The prison provides regular "enrichment days" on which a range of visitors deliver talks and workshops in their specialist areas of expertise. The prison's enrichment programme also includes first Aid, origami and parenting.
