= Clayton, Staffordshire =

Suburb and ward in Staffordshire, England

Coordinates: 52.9868°N 2.2257°W

Clayton
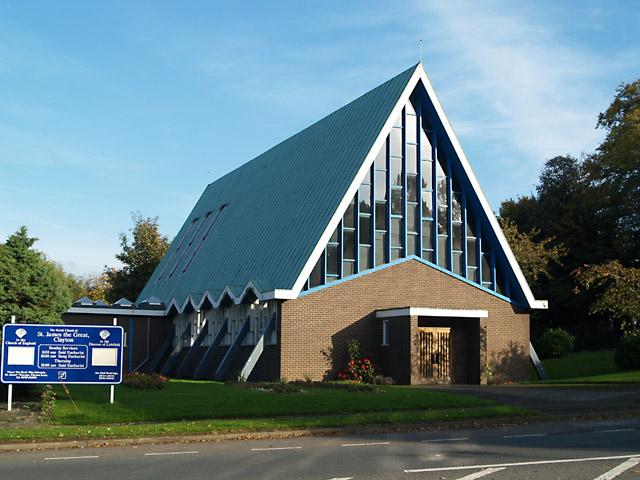
- Church of St James the Great in Clayton

- Location within the United Kingdom
- Population: 4,026 (2001 Census)
- OS grid reference: SJ849433
- District: Newcastle-under-Lyme
- Shire county: Staffordshire
- Country: England
- Sovereign state: United Kingdom
- Post town: NEWCASTLE
- Postcode district: ST5
- Dialling code: 01782
- UK Parliament: Newcastle-under-Lyme

Clayton is a suburb and ward in the Newcastle-under-Lyme district, in Staffordshire, England.

== Today ==
Clayton lies on the boundary between urban and rural Staffordshire, not far from Newcastle's border with the Borough of Stafford. The older part of the village stands on top of a hill, Northwood Lane, and some of these older houses were once gardeners' cottages on the Staffordshire estates of the Duke of Sutherland, who owned the Trentham Estate.

Towards Trent Vale is the Clayton Wood Training Ground and the football academy of Stoke City F.C.

== Education ==
Clayton has one secondary school, Clayton Hall Academy. It has been developed on the site of the 19th century Clayton Hall and has around 1000 pupils. Until 2005 it was named Clayton High School. The school then became a specialist school in Business & Enterprise and Modern Languages and was hence renamed Clayton Hall Business and Language College. The school converted to academy status in 2015 and was then renamed Clayton Hall Academy. The school was deemed Good by Ofsted in the most recent inspection.

== Religion ==
Clayton has a Catholic church, Our Lady and St Werburgh, which has over 500 regular worshippers. The neighbouring Catholic primary school of the same name was deemed Good by Ofsted in the most recent inspection. The parish runs a youth group, an over-55s group, and a parents and toddlers group. The church also runs a charity, LinkLine, which provides weekly over-the-phone support and companionship to housebound elderly people in the community.

St James the Great is the local Anglican church. It has a distinctive blue-green copper roof, originally orange-red in colour, a result of oxidation over time. The church runs a Sunday School for children.

St Luke's is the local Methodist church. It runs a 'senior moments' club and hosts concerts throughout the year.

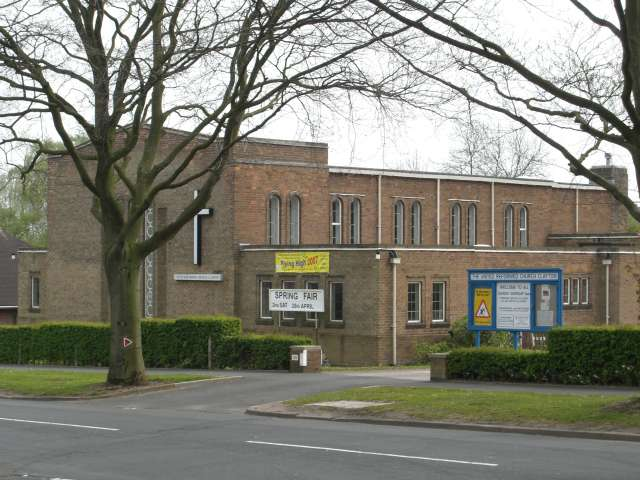
The Former United Reformed Church, Clayton

What is today Newcastle Baptist Church (NBC) converted to a Baptist church in 2012; prior to this, it was part of the United Reformed Church. Since then, extensive building work has been done to create a new entrance and a community building at the rear of the site.

== Other amenities ==
There is a hospital and a hotel on Clayton Rd (the A519). The hospital is the Nuffield Health North Staffordshire Hospital. It was opened in 1978 and is a purpose-built private healthcare facility with two operating theatres, one minor/endoscopy suite and 40 en-suite bedrooms.

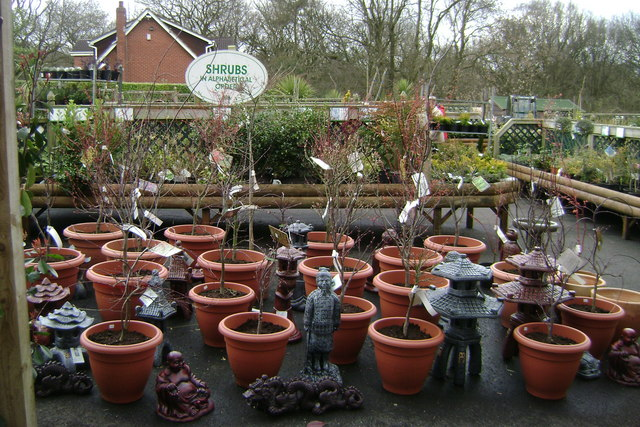
Northwood Garden Centre, Clayton

Close to Junction 15 of the M6 is a Holiday Inn. There was previously another hotel in Clayton, which changed hands (and names) several times; it was the Ramada Clayton Lodge Hotel, then the Great National, Clayton. In 2017 it changed ownership and its name was again Clayton Lodge. It closed to guests in April 2020 and, in April 2021, a severe fire broke out, causing serious damage to the building. It was demolished in 2023. As of 2024 the site is being redeveloped for 48 new homes.

At the top of Northwood Lane are Clayton Community Centre and the family-run Northwood Garden Centre.

== Civil parish ==
Clayton was formerly a township in the parish of Stoke-upon-Trent, from 1896 Clayton was a civil parish in its own right, on 1 April 1932 the parish was abolished and merged with Newcastle under Lyme. In 1931 the parish had a population of 264.

== Transport ==
=== Buses ===
A bus service is operated by D&G Bus (number 9) which runs between Clayton, Newcastle-under-Lyme, Stoke-on-Trent and Biddulph. From Monday-Friday this is a half-hourly service, and on Saturday an hourly service. The bus route does not run on Sundays.

=== Road ===
The A519 runs south through Clayton towards Eccleshall and Newport, Shropshire via junction 15 of the M6 motorway. Junction 15 also marks the southern end of the A500 (locally known as the 'D-road'), which runs north through Stoke-on-Trent and west towards Nantwich. In the neighbouring ward of the Westlands is the A53, which runs south-west to Market Drayton and Shrewsbury and north-east into the Peak District.

== Notable people ==
- Clarice Cliff, (1899–1972) English ceramic artist active from 1922 to 1963, lived in Chetwynd House on Northwood Lane from 1940 until her death in 1972.
- Raymond Furnell (1936–2006) vicar of Clayton 1969–1975 and Dean of York from 1994–2003.
- Peter Nigel Gill (born 1947 in Clayton) former English cricketer, right-handed batsman who bowled right-arm off break.
- Eddie Hall (1988–) English professional strongman, notable for winning the World's Strongest Man 2017 competition and for being the world record deadlift holder, lifting 500 kg.

== See also ==
- Listed buildings in Newcastle-under-Lyme
