= Kidsgrove Secondary School =

Location
- Gloucester Road; Kidsgrove, Staffordshire, ST7 4DL; England
- Coordinates: 53.094°N 2.233°W

Information
- Type: Academy
- Local authority: Staffordshire County Council
- Trust: Shaw Education Trust
- Department for Education URN: 146635 Tables
- Ofsted: Reports
- Head of School: Steven Frost
- Gender: Coeducational
- Age: 11 to 16
- Website: https://kidsgrovesecondary.org.uk/

Kidsgrove Secondary School is a coeducational secondary school located in Kidsgrove in the English county of Staffordshire.

== History ==
=== 1987 arson attack ===
There was an arson attack in the early hours of Thursday 23 July 1987. Three fire engines attended, for 30 minutes.

=== Academy ===
It was originally known as Maryhill High School before converting to academy status in June 2013. The school was then renamed University Academy Kidsgrove, sponsored by the University of Chester Academies Trust. In 2018 the school was taken over by the Shaw Education Trust after the University of Chester Academies Trust experienced financial difficulties. The school was then renamed Kidsgrove Secondary School after a ballot of the local area. In 2020 the school had a £500,000 refurbishment.

Kidsgrove Secondary School offers GCSEs and BTECS as programmes of study for pupils, with some courses offered in conjunction with Madeley High School. The school also operates The Duke of Edinburgh's Award scheme.
