= JCB Academy =

The JCB Academy

Location
- Mill Street; Rocester, Staffordshire, ST14 5JX; England; 52.950148°N 1.832450°W

Information
- Type: University Technical College
- Motto: Developing engineers and business leaders for the future
- Established: Academy September 2010, UTC September 2013
- Founder: Sir Anthony Bamford
- Department for Education URN: 139234 Tables
- Ofsted: Reports
- Vice Chair: David Bell
- Principal: Jim Bailey
- Staff: Around 70
- Gender: Mixed
- Age: 14 to 19
- Enrolment: 728 As of May 2021
- Capacity: 800
- Houses: Bamford, Arkwright, Royce
- Colours: Red, Yellow & Green
- Sixth Form: JCB Academy
- Sixth Form URN: 2527510
- Sixth Form Website: https://jcbacademy-sixthform.com/
- Website: https://www.jcbacademy.com/

The JCB Academy is a non-selective co-educational secondary school within the English University Technical College programme, in Rocester, Staffordshire, England. It specialises in engineering and business qualifications.

== Governance ==
The school is named after its sponsor, construction equipment manufacturer J. C. Bamford Excavators Limited. It is a registered charity under the formal name The JCB Academy Trust. The lead academic sponsor of the school is Harper Adams University, and the school is also supported by the Royal Academy of Engineering. Sir Anthony Bamford remains influential.

== History ==
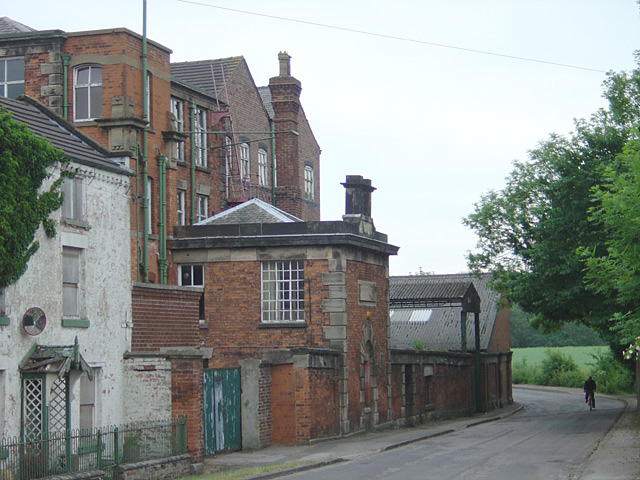
Arkwright's Tutbury Mill

The JCB Academy was the first of the new technical schools to open in the UK, opening in September 2010 in the converted and refurbished Arkwright Mill in Rocester, Staffordshire.

Bamford had an historic interest in technical education. His company needed a steady supply of high quality apprentices. Since Victorian Times, the United Kingdom had not been able to develop a sustainable model for Technical Education, always giving a didactic academic education a higher status than a vocational education.

His privately sponsored school for 540 pupils between 14 and 19 opened under the academy program with the educational support of Staffordshire County Council. The conversion of 1761 Tutbury Mill and opening the school cost £20 million.

Bamford's ideas were in tune with government thinking - the academy was established with the support of senior business leaders adding their names as sponsors. Harper Adams, the agricultural college, that had recently been given university status agreed to become their University Sponsor. In 2013, the academy was reopened as a university technical college.

The government was aware that a large number of children and young people were underachieving against their benchmark test, or dropping out of school completely. The political assumption was these children hated schools because teachers were failing, schools were failing and what was needed was more discipline and rigour. People in industry, with top academic degrees would be able to sort out the schools and get good A levels where teachers had failed. The industrial partners would start by designing a 'work relevant' curriculum, set up the classrooms with modern industry standard equipment, then help with the staffing allowing AOTs (adults other than teachers)to help in the classroom. The sponsors had a two-day residential where they did team building and established aims and objective, defined industries potential role and started on curriculum design. All the sponsors had been involved in educational initiatives before.

=== The first intake ===
The JCB Academy opened in September 2010 for its first intake. The incoming students started the year on a residential team building course at Harper Adams. Here they were inducted into workshop safety.

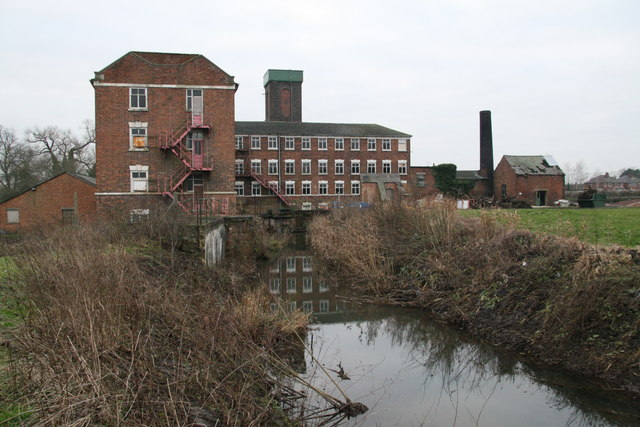
Tutbury Mill

== Partnerships ==
JCB made a significant contribution to the setting up of the UTC: both financially to building and to setting up the workshops with industry standard equipment and overseeing the startup. This was the first UTC so there were no precedents. It employs teachers and engineering mentors who need training on teaching techniques. It has persuaded other internationally known companies to join, and to cooperate on the setting of the curriculum suitable for Key Stage 4 youngsters. There are partnerships with Toyota, Fujitsu, JCB, Bosch Rexroth, and Barclays Bank. The partnerships were formed at a senior level with companies and a university that had significant dealings with Bamford and JCB.

The companies designed the 'challenges' being allowed to select a field where they were strong. The teaching staff helped then understand what was feasible, then integrated the topic into the academic syllabus so it complied with the National Curriculum requirements. Toyota donated its Quality Assurance System and Process Control so the procedures used by the youngsters are exactly the same as within the firm.

The partners did not find the partnership financially onerous, but it did occupy a lot of staff time. Having observed the school closely they were impressed by the achievements of the students, but felt the training was over prescriptive and did not allow the students to build up creative thinking and entrepreneurship. To them an in-house apprentice training programme was a better funded option. They were concerned about the paucity of government funding to secondary schools and to engineering classes in particular, they suggested that without some external income the academy would fail. One source would be to market apprenticeship training using the onsite facilities. Having observed it from the inside, the partners had seen how complex teaching was, the barriers and difficulties created by a continually changing intrusive central government education policies. The founder partners were critical of the lack of support the UTC has received from the DfE.

The academy provides the apprenticeship training for JCB and others. In 2019 it was rated good by Ofsted on the training and skills agenda.

== Facilities ==
The school has learning areas, 12 full-size engineering workshops, break-out areas for relaxation and private study, and a sixth form common-room area. It has also sports facilities and an activity studio. Much of the learning is via virtual learning environment (VLE): students are provided with laptops.

== Curriculum ==
A UTC's curriculum differs from standard secondary school, with a focus on providing all the subjects required in an academy, though with an engineering focus, plus BTECs and 40 days a year work experience. There is a longer school day. Arts and humanities were offered as after school clubs.

The sixth-form is in a separate Grade II listed building called The Lodge. It offers a limited range of A Levels, principally in STEM subjects: Maths, Physics, Chemistry, Product Design with BTEC level 3 diploma and extended diploma in Engineering or Business.

== Outcomes ==
Ofsted inspected the school in 2018 and rated it 'Good'. "Pupils at key stage 4 make strong progress in a range of subjects from their low starting points. Outcomes in 2018, for example, showed further improved outcomes, particularly in English and mathematics." They go on to appropriate education or take advantage of school's close link with a wide range business partners, and take up career opportunities there.

Attainment in the sixth form has historically been relatively weak and remained below national averages for 2017 and 2018, particularly in mathematics with better outcomes in engineering and business. A new sixth-form curriculum has been introduced where the courses are matched to the students abilities, needs and future target career.

Ofsted inspected the Apprentice School in 2019 and rated it 'Good'.

== See also ==
- List of schools in Staffordshire
- Baker Dearing Trust
