= Jack Manuel =

English cricketer

Personal information
- Full name: Jack Kenneth Manuel
- Born: 13 February 1991 (age 35); Sutton Coldfield, Warwickshire, England
- Batting: Left-handed
- Bowling: Right-arm off break

Domestic team information
- Years: Team
- 2009–2010: Staffordshire
- 2010–2012: Worcestershire (squad no. 26)

Career statistics
Competition	FC	LA	T20
Matches	1	7	13
Runs scored	5	142	111
Batting average	2.50	20.28	11.10
100s/50s	0/0	0/0	0/0
Top score	5	48	31
Catches/stumpings	0/–	3/–	3/–
- Source: Cricinfo, 22 September 2011

Jack Kenneth Manuel (born 13 February 1991) is an English cricketer. Manuel is a left-handed batsman who bowls right-arm off break. He was born in Sutton Coldfield, Warwickshire and educated at Wilnecote High School in Tamworth.

Manuel made his debut in county cricket for Staffordshire in the 2009 MCCA Knockout Trophy against Suffolk. He made six appearances in the competition in 2009, with three further appearances in 2010. He made his debut for England Under-19s in 2009, playing Youth Test, One Day International and Twenty20 International matches in 2009 and 2010.

The 2010 season saw him make his debut for Worcestershire in a Twenty20 match in the Friends Provident t20 against Northamptonshire. That same season also saw him make his List A debut against Sussex in the Clydesdale Bank 40. The following season he made his first-class debut against Somerset in the 2011 County Championship. In his only first-class appearance to date, he scored 5 runs in Worcestershire's first-innings of the match, before being dismissed by Alfonso Thomas, while in their second-innings he was dismissed for a duck by Murali Kartik. To date he has played seven List A matches and thirteen Twenty20 matches.
