= The Westleigh School =

Location
- Westleigh Lane; Leigh; Greater Manchester, WN7 5NL; England; 53.5145°N 2.529°W

Information
- Type: Academy
- Established: 1976
- Local authority: Wigan Council
- Trust: Shaw Education Trust
- Department for Education URN: 146087 Tables
- Ofsted: Reports
- Headteacher: Carlton Bramwell
- Gender: Mixed
- Age: 11 to 16
- Website: https://www.thewestleighschool.co.uk/

The Westleigh School (formerly Westleigh High School) is a co-educational secondary school located in Leigh in the English county of Greater Manchester.

It was first established by Lancashire County Council and became a comprehensive school in 1976. Later the school also gained a specialism in technology. Previously a community school administered by Wigan Metropolitan Borough Council, in August 2018 Westleigh High School converted to academy status and was renamed The Westleigh School. The school is now sponsored by the Shaw Education Trust.

The Westleigh School offers GCSEs, BTECs and the CiDA as programmes of study for pupils.
