= Listed buildings in Werrington, Staffordshire =

Werrington is a civil parish in the district of Staffordshire Moorlands, Staffordshire, England. It contains seven listed buildings that are recorded in the National Heritage List for England. All the listed buildings are designated at Grade II, the lowest of the three grades, which is applied to "buildings of national importance and special interest". The parish contains the village of Werrington and the surrounding area. The listed buildings consist of three farmhouses, a larger house and its lodge, a stone post that possibly once marked a boundary, and a milepost.

== Buildings ==
| Name and location | Photograph | Date | Notes |
|---|---|---|---|
| Stone post at SJ 9342 4781; 53.02789°N 2.10019°W | — | 14th to 16th century | The post, which probably marked a boundary, is in millstone grit. It has a truncated shaft, it is about 4 feet 9 inches (1.45 m) tall, and is on a roughly hewn base. |
| Eaves Farmhouse; 53.03344°N 2.12333°W | — | Late 17th century | The farmhouse, which was later altered and extended, is in stone on a plinth, the gables have been rebuilt in brick, the roof is tiled, and has verge parapets with pitched copings on corbelled kneelers. There are two storeys, two bays, and a lower single-bay brick extension on the left. The windows are casements in chamfered surrounds. |
| Brookhouse Lane Farmhouse; 53.02653°N 2.11826°W | — | 1744 | The farmhouse was extended in the 19th century to the left with a farm building, which has later been incorporated into the house. The building is in stone, and has a tile roof with verge parapets and pitched copings on corbelled kneelers. The original part has two storeys and two bays. In the centre is a doorway with a heavy inscribed and dated lintel. The windows have chamfered mullions, and in the upper floor are half-dormers with gablets. The later part has three bays, and contains a former cart entry with a segmental head. |
| Boltongate Farmhouse; 52.99925°N 2.09560°W | — | Early 19th century | A stone farmhouse with a tile roof, two storeys, and three bays. In the centre is a doorway, the windows in the upper floor are sashes, and in the ground floor they have been replaced by casements. |
| Ash Hall; 53.02309°N 2.10760°W | | c. 1841 | A large house in Tudor style. It is in stone, and has a slate roof with shaped gables and finials, fretted balustrades, and turrets at the angles. There are two storeys and attics, and an L-shaped plan, with an entrance range, and a service range at right angles. The symmetrical entrance front has three bays. In the centre is a protruding porch with octagonal miniature turrets at the angles rising to domed pinnacles, a Tudor arched double doorway over which is a fretted parapet with a coat of arms in the centre. In the outer bays are two-storey canted bay windows, and above the porch is a stepped three-light window. |
| Lodge to Ash Hall; 53.02173°N 2.10605°W | — | c. 1841 | The lodge, which is in Tudor style, is in stone, and has a slate roof with shaped gables and finials. There is a single storey and three bays. In the centre is a projecting gabled porch with a coat of arms in the tympanum and a double door with an ogee head. In the outer bays are windows with hood moulds. |
| Milepost at SJ 943 475; 53.02488°N 2.08553°W | | Early 20th century (possible) | The milepost is on the south side of the A52 road. It is in cast iron, and has a triangular section and a sloping top. On the top is "WERRINGTON" and on the sides are the distances to Bucknall, Hanley, Stoke-on-Trent, Newcastle-under-Lyme, Froghall, Cheadle, and Ashbourne. |
