= Newcastle-under-Lyme Castle =

Motte-and-bailey castle in Shropshire, England

- Staffordshire, England
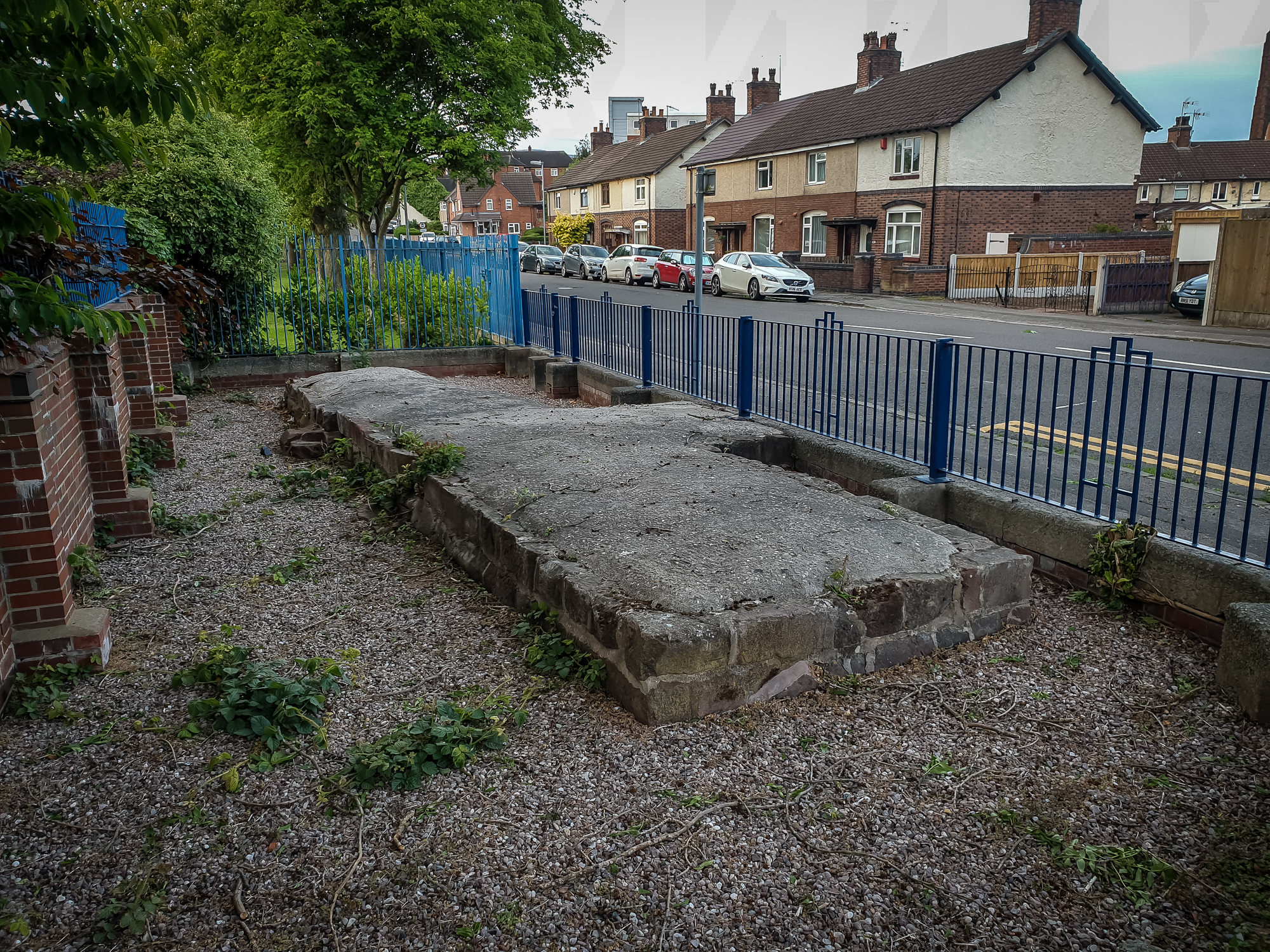
- Gateway to the bailey of Newcastle-under-Lyme Castle

Site information
- Type: Motte-and-bailey castle
- Open to the public: yes
- Condition: Ruined

Location
- Coordinates: 53.01063°N 2.23364°W
- Grid reference: grid reference SJ848459

Site history
- Built: 1140s
- Built by: Unknown
- In use: 1140s – early 16th century
- Materials: Ashlar masonry
- Demolished: 1630s

Newcastle-under-Lyme Castle, once known as The New Castle, is a grade II listed motte-and-bailey castle in Newcastle-under-Lyme, Staffordshire, England which has partial ruins existing today.

It was located on the site of Pool Dam Playing Fields and the remains of the motte and some of the castle walls can still be seen today.

== History ==
Newcastle-under-Lyme Castle was built during the 1140s amidst the The Anarchy to replace Chesterton Castle, and Ranulf de Gernon, 4th Earl of Chester owned the castle in 1149. The town of Newcastle-under-Lyme grew around the castle and it was rebuilt using stone during the 13th century.

John of Gaunt, Duke of Lancaster owned the castle in 1362, and it was no longer a royal stronghold by 1399 and the castle was repaired several times during the 14th and 15th centuries. When John Leland visited Newcastle-under-Lyme in 1541, only "one great Toure" remained, and the ruins were still present when the site was leased to Ralph Sneyd in 1610. The surviving "great Toure" was demolished during the 1630s.

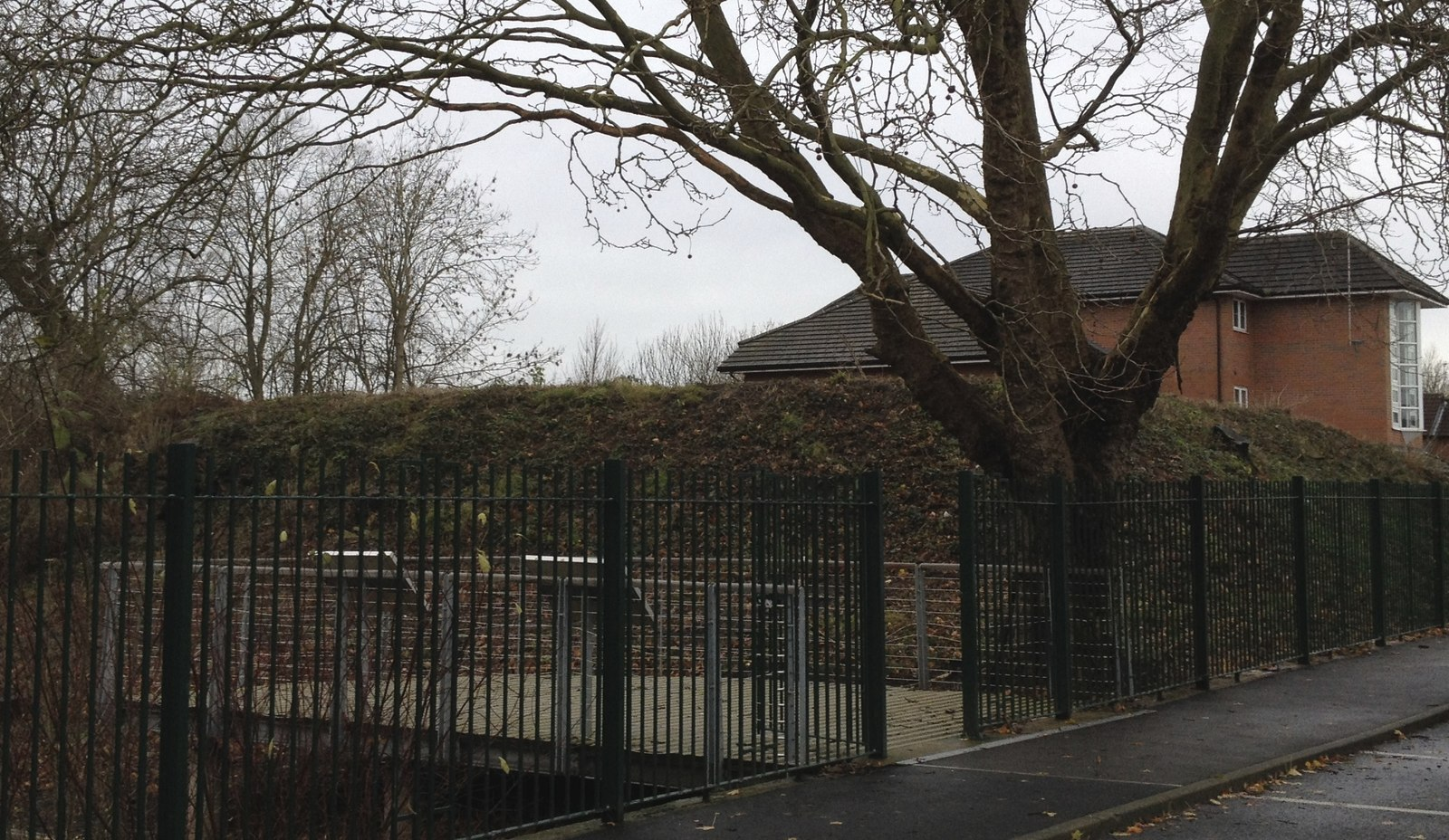
Surviving section of the motte

Walter Sneyd purchased the site in 1828 and he drained the moat and pool after an inspection due to a local cholera epidemic found the moat to contain sewerage. The motte was present in 1832 but the western side was cut back and damaged during the construction of Castle Hill Iron Foundry in 1855 and the construction of Silverdale Road shortly after.

The site of Newcastle-under-Lyme Castle was converted into the Queen Elizabeth Gardens by 1944, and the area was further developed in 1955 and 1969 with housing estates being built on the site of the castle and the "great Toure".

On 27 September 1972 it became a grade II listed building, listed as "Castle Foundations". On 9 October 1981 it became a scheduled monument, listed as "Motte and bailey castle 100m and 200m south of St Mary's School".

== Excavations ==
Newcastle-under-Lyme Castle was first excavated in 1895 and extensive excavations were undertaken between 1933 and 1935 by Thomas Pape and the gateway to the bailey, the great hall, the kitchen, and the motte were identified alongside several of the castle walls discovered while sewage pipes were being installed. Some of the ashlar masonry was later re-buried.
