= Mike Coulman =

English rugby league coach and player (1944–2023)

Personal information
- Full name: Michael John Coulman
- Born: 6 May 1944 Stone, Staffordshire, England
- Died: 21 April 2023 (aged 78)

Playing information

Rugby union
- Position: Prop
Club
Years	Team	Pld	T	G	FG	P
1964–68	Moseley RUFC
Representative
Years	Team	Pld	T	G	FG	P
1967–68	England	9	1	0	0	3
1968	British and Irish Lions	1	0	0	0	0

Rugby league
- Position: prop, Second-row
Club
Years	Team	Pld	T	G	FG	P
1968–83	Salford	463	135	2	0	408
Representative
Years	Team	Pld	T	G	FG	P
1971	Great Britain	3	1	0	0	3
1975–77	England	5	0	0	0	0
1975	Other Nationalities	1	0	0	0	0
1977	Lancashire	1	1	0	0	3

Coaching information
Club
Years	Team	Gms	W	D	L	W%
1983–84	Salford	26	5	0	21	19

Michael John Coulman (6 May 1944 – 21 April 2023) was an English rugby footballer, and coach. He played at the highest levels in both rugby union and rugby league - a dual-code rugby international.

== Playing career ==
=== Rugby union ===
Born in Stone, Staffordshire, played for his school, Rising Brook Secondary Modern in Stafford where he was selected to play for England Schoolboys against Wales in 1959. Coulman joined Stafford RUFC in 1960 and appeared at representative level for both Staffordshire and North Midlands Coulman joined Moseley in 1964, and was capped nine times as a prop for the England national rugby union team between 1967 and 1968 and scored one try for England. He was selected for the 1968 British Lions tour to South Africa, and started the 3rd Test against South Africa, but lasted only five minutes of the game before tearing the ligaments round his ankle.

On 16 September 1968 Coulman announced that he was crossing codes and turning professional rugby league for Salford. This meant that as well as being banned from anything to do with rugby union he would also be resigning from Staffordshire Police - who he had joined as a cadet on leaving school in 1961. His last game of rugby union was for the county police team on 18 September 1968 as he signed for Salford the following day. His appearance for the police was controversial as the rugby union ban took effect as soon as Coulman intimated that he was turning professional. The police defended their decision to select Coulman stating that when they selected him he had not signed for Salford and that "The only evidence we had that Coulman was not eligible were the stories we read in the newspapers. And you cannot believe everything you read in the newspapers." The Welsh rugby union international, Ken Braddock, who captained the police team in the game was officially reprimanded by the Welsh Rugby Union for playing alongside a professional.

=== Rugby league ===
After 1968 he signed for Salford where he won two championship medals. He was selected in the England squad for the 1975 Rugby League World Cup, and made two tournament appearances - the 10 June 1975 pool match against Wales in Brisbane, the 28 June match against Australia at the SCG. Coulman's testimonial match at Salford took place in 1979. He also appeared for Other Nationalities and Lancashire.

Coulman played right-second-row and was man of the match in Salford's 2-6 defeat by Widnes in the 1974 Lancashire Cup at Central Park, Wigan on Saturday 2 November 1974.

Coulman played left-prop in Salford's 0–0 draw with Warrington in the 1974 BBC2 Floodlit Trophy Final at The Willows, Salford on Tuesday 17 December 1974. He did not play (Alan Grice played left-prop) in the replay.

== Coaching career ==
Following his retirement as a player, Coulman coached Salford for the 1983–84 Rugby Football League season. He was replaced at the end of the season by Kevin Ashcroft following the club's relegation at the end of the season.

== Death ==
Coulman died on 21 April 2023, at the age of 78.
