= Landau Forte Academy Amington =

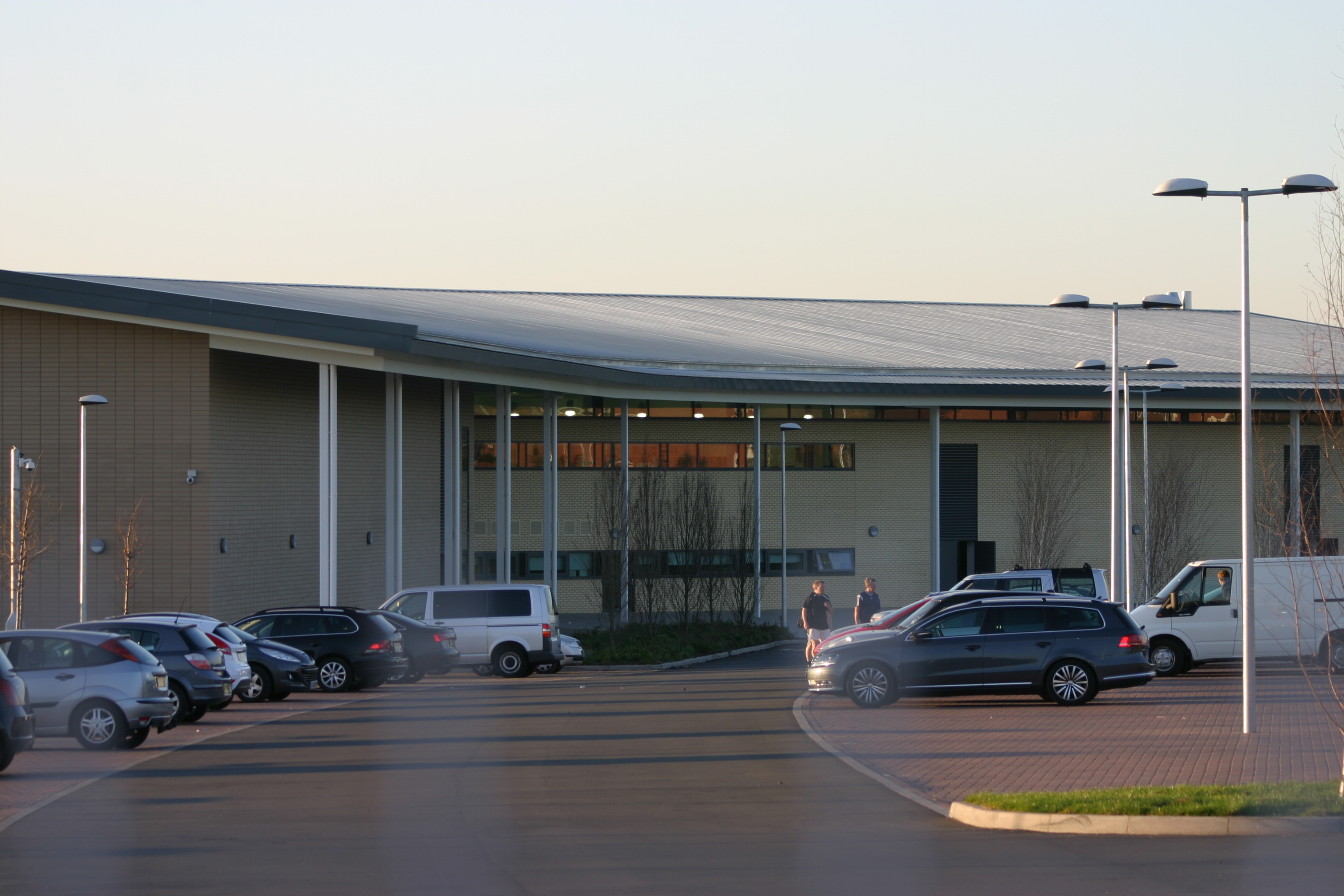

Location
- Woodland Road; Tamworth, Staffordshire, B77 4FF; England; 52°37′56″N 1°39′41″W

Information
- Type: Academy
- Motto: Ambitious. Brave. Kind.
- Department for Education URN: 136136 Tables
- Ofsted: Reports
- Principal: Andrew Deen
- Staff: 100
- Gender: Mixed
- Age: 11 to 16
- Enrolment: 780
- Colours: Navy, Red and White
- Website: http://www.lfata.org.uk

Landau Forte Academy Amington (previously Landau Forte Academy Tamworth), is a high school situated in Amington, a suburb of Tamworth, Staffordshire. The school has around 100 teaching staff and over 900 pupils.

== History ==
Formerly a state school known as Woodhouse High School, it was opened in 1971 (by then Secretary of State for Education Margaret Thatcher) as Tamworth's first purpose-built mixed comprehensive high school.

The school was one of the first in Staffordshire to gain the prestigious Staffordshire Partnership Award for outstanding school industry links.

After being placed in special measures by OFSTED in 2007, the school continued to improve its GCSE results for three years and currently around 80% of pupils achieve the government's target of 5 A*-C grades at GCSE. The changeover to Landau Forte briefly provided the school with better results before dipping for two years in succession like many academies nationwide. The same benchmark for 5 A* to C GCSE results including English and Maths then showed a drop to 42% in 2012 and a further decrease to 37% in 2013 with the school once again performing in line with the old Woodhouse High School despite the massive investment, restructuring and rebranding. In 2020 and 2021 the school praised a number of high performing students at GCSE after traditional exams were cancelled.

OFSTED conducted two monitoring visits in 2021 and both occasions reported that the school was taking effective action in order to become a good school. In May 2022 the school was rated as Good by Ofsted.

The school was renamed in 2007 from 'Woodhouse High School' to 'Woodhouse Business and Enterprise College' where the school specialized in Business Studies classes. The school was a member of the Specialist Schools and Academies Trust.

As a part of Building Schools for the Future programme, Landau Forte Charitable Trust took over the management of the school and the school became an Academy in September 2010. Pupils and staff moved into a custom-built facility in September 2011, opened officially on 21 September by the Duchess of Gloucester. Simultaneously, the Sixth Forms of the other Tamworth schools - QEMS, The Rawlett School, Belgrave High School and Wilnecote High School closed in 2011 and re-opened at the new Landau Forte Sixth Form next to Queen Elizabeth's Mercian School and South Staffordshire College in the town centre.

In 2020, the school was praised for producing a charity advent calendar where staff donated a different item each day until the end of term, with the donations then being given to a local food bank and charity.

In 2021, the school was one of the first in the country to be awarded the Remote Learning Accreditation quality mark.

== Facilities ==
Facilities include the school's sports centre, floodlit astroturf playing surface and tennis courts open to both students and the local community after school hours.

== Incidents ==
In 2015, a female student was spotted with a knife on Academy grounds. A police inquiry was opened shortly after the incident.

In March 2017, an unknown man was caught outside the academy masturbating by a student's mother. The same type of incident occurred later in the month although it is assumed that the public indecency was committed by a different perpetrator.

== Notable students ==
In 2022, Catherine Morris who attended Woodhouse High School (1989–94) was awarded an OBE for services to Healthcare and Child Welfare in India

Ryan Stirk - SEMI Professional Footballer

Marc Albrighton - Professional Footballer
