= Collab Group =

UK educational organization

The Collab Group was a membership organisation representing a network of 29 colleges and college groups of further education in the United Kingdom.

The organization was set up as the 157 Group in 2006. Its creation was announced at that year's Association of Colleges annual conference chaired by the then Secretary of State for Education Alan Johnson, with its former name taken from the 157th paragraph of a British government paper on education, The Foster Report (formally the Review of the future role of FE colleges), published a year previously.

The group changed its name to the Collab Group in October 2016, and announced that it would focus on commercial collaboration between colleges.

The Collab Group closed down its activities at the end of 2023.
