= The Rural Enterprise Academy =

Location
- Rodbaston Drive; Penkridge, Staffordshire, ST19 5PH; England; 52°42′11″N 2°07′01″W

Information
- Type: Free school
- Established: 2012
- Trust: Penk Valley Academy Trust
- Department for Education URN: 138351 Tables
- Ofsted: Reports
- Principal: Annabel Stoddart
- Gender: Coeducational
- Age: 11 to 16
- Enrolment: 236
- Website: www.ruralenterpriseacademy.com

The Rural Enterprise Academy is a coeducational high school and sixth form located in Penkridge, Staffordshire, UK. It was the first dedicated land-based free school in England, and its aim is to develop rural entrepreneurs and business leaders.

Free schools were introduced in England in 2010 to pioneer innovative approaches to education, but analysis in 2018 by the National Foundation for Educational Research and the Sutton Trust found that only a third had achieved this; in their report, the Rural Enterprise Academy was highlighted as a particularly successful example of genuine novelty in their curriculum in catering for an area with a significant local farming community. The Academy was rated "Inadequate" by Ofsted in 2024.

The Rural Enterprise Academy is sponsored by South Staffordshire College, Veolia and the National Farmers Union.

== Facilities ==
The Academy is located on a 180-hectare (440-acre) site that includes an equine centre, zoo, fish hatchery, working farm, formal gardens and horticulture facilities as well as classrooms, IT and science laboratories, and sports facilities.

== Curriculum ==
The academy has chosen to offer a three-year Key Stage 3 with a broad-based curriculum of core and rural subjects. These are grouped in to three 'arcs': Environmental, Creative and Technological. In the first arc are grouped plant and animal husbandry and woodland management. In the second comes PE, art, music and dance and the third covers the use of computer applications.

The Key Stage 4 curriculum features courses in the land-based, environmental and sustainability sectors, preparing students for both vocational and academic qualifications. All students study for GCSEs and/or BTECs in English, maths, science, geography, and business. In addition, students in KS4 (years 10 & 11, ages 14–16) may choose optional subjects such as animal care, agriculture, IT, sport, and construction. Students also follow non-examined courses in religious education, physical education and CPSHE (citizenship, personal, social & health education). Students are not offered a foreign language at Key Stage 4, so are unable to obtain the English Baccalaureate.

== Extra-curricular activities ==
A wide range of rural-based extra-curricular activities is available, including game bird management, horse riding, horse care, and zoo training, and students can also take part in The Duke of Edinburgh's Award scheme.
