= Blessed William Howard Catholic School =

Location
- Rowley Avenue; Stafford, Staffordshire, ST17 9AB; England; 52°48′00″N 2°07′22″W

Information
- Type: Academy
- Religious affiliation: Roman Catholic
- Established: 1963
- Local authority: Staffordshire
- Department for Education URN: 142193 Tables
- Ofsted: Reports
- Principal: Thomas Dudley
- Gender: Mixed
- Age: 11 to 18
- Enrolment: 985
- Colours: Green and Red
- Website: blessedwilliamhoward.org.uk

The Blessed William Howard Catholic School is a mixed secondary school and sixth form located in Stafford, Staffordshire, England.

The school was originally opened in 1963. The name Blessed William Howard comes from the site on which the school is located. William Howard was the 1st Viscount of Stafford in the 17th century, and owned the land on which the current school is built. He was convicted of treason and executed in 1680, wrongly so, as it is viewed by the Roman Catholic Church. The Church therefore beatified him in 1929, and he became known as Blessed William Howard. Thus the school is named eponymously.

Blessed William Howard was previously a voluntary aided school administered by Staffordshire County Council, and gained specialist Arts College status in 2003. In March 2016 the school was converted to academy status, however Blessed William Howard continues to coordinate with Staffordshire County Council for admissions. The school continues to be under the guidance of the Roman Catholic Archdiocese of Birmingham.

The sixth form provision forms part of the Stafford Collegiate which includes all Stafford secondary schools and Stafford College.

== Notable former pupils ==
- Tom Edwards (b. 1999) – Stoke City footballer
- Peter Turnbull (b. 1989) – cricketer
