= Shaw Trust =

British charity

- Founded: 1982
- Type: Charity
- Location: Bristol, England, UK
- Region served: England, Wales, Scotland
- Key people: Chris Luck CEO
- Website: www.shawtrust.org.uk

Shaw Trust is a charitable organisation in the United Kingdom which supports people with complex needs into good work. It was founded in the village of Shaw in Wiltshire in 1982.

Shaw Trust surpluses are reinvested through its charitable Shaw Trust Foundation into programmes to improve prospects for individuals and communities.

In 2017, Shaw Trust acquired Ixion and Prospects, making it the 14th largest charity in the UK. It has 3,000 employees supported by 850 volunteers, and delivers contracts for major funding agencies including the European Social Fund, Department for Work and Pensions, Big Lottery Fund, Education and Skills Funding Agency, Department for Education, Ministry of Justice and local government and employers.

Since 2019, the CEO has been Chris Luck.

== Areas of work ==
The Trust helped deliver the Work Programme, and the specialist Work Choice employment support schemes across Britain. The charity helps people gain skills and find work via a wide range of activities including education and skills contracts, 49 shops and a national volunteering programme as well as health and social enterprise projects.

Shaw Trust helps people gain qualifications through specialised programmes, and helps people seeking work through support in job search skills, interview practice and practical help to enter employment.

Shaw Trust is also an approved sponsor for academies through the Shaw Education Trust.

== Community enterprises and projects ==
Shaw Trust runs a range of enterprises and projects – many of which are open to the public – across sectors including catering, recycling and horticulture. These initiatives are firmly embedded in the local communities and provide clients with a broad range of learning and skills development as well as employment opportunities.

People taking part benefit from a range of initiatives including accredited on-site training, work experience and employment, supervisory roles and core learning such as numeracy, literacy and IT skills.

Horticulture

In 2010/11 the horticulture social enterprises provided employment and training opportunities for over 1000 young people and adults with challenging barriers to employment.

Current locations (as of August 2025) listed by the Shaw Trust are:

Garden Centres

- Canons Park, Stanmore
- Palmer Gardens, Trowbridge (also cafe)
- Billing Garden Centre (Mentioned on Shaw Trust Garden Centres map)
- Chislehurst, South London
- Parkside, Seaham (near Newcastle)
- Stockton on Tees (also cafe)

Enterprises

- Duddingston Yards, Edinburgh
- Newton Farm Ecology Park, Harrow, London
- South Essex Crematorium, Ockendon Rd, Upminster
- Walton Hall Academy, Eccleshall, Stafford

Previous locations include Portsmouth, Clamp Hill in Stanmore, and Westbank Enterprises in Perthshire, Scotland. These are no longer listed on the Shaw Trust website as operating.

Wood recycling

Shaw Trust offers wood recycling services at Scadbury Park, Chislehurst, South London.

Manufacturing

Shaw Trust Industries (Doncaster) is a factory run as a social enterprise by the Trust. They manufacture the following products:

- Plastic protective edging
- Electromagnetic powder coating
- Injection moulding

Food services

Shaw Trust has catering services ranging from cafes to a 'tuck by truck' snack delivery business.

== Shops ==
Shaw Trust has 32 charity shops in several areas of England, Wales and Scotland, stocking a wide range of items that have been donated for resale. All shops are staffed by volunteers and Shaw Trust staff. The income raised from shops goes to projects that support disabled and disadvantaged people in local communities.

Shops also help develop clients’ employability skills through work experience and work placements. They provide a safe and supportive environment for clients to develop confidence and skills.

== Shaw Education Trust ==
In 2014, the Department for Education awarded Approved Sponsor of Academy status to the Trust. A multi-academy trust, Shaw Education Trust, was created to support special schools and mainstream schools serving disadvantaged communities. As of December 2021, the trust oversees 25 primary and secondary schools in north-west England and the Midlands.

=== Shaw Education Trust schools ===
- Blackfriars Academy, Newcastle-under-Lyme
- Brookfields School, Widnes
- Coppice Academy, Newcastle-under-Lyme
- Endon High School, Endon
- Evergreen Academy, Wolverhampton
- Fortis Academy, Birmingham
- Ivy House School, Derby
- Kidsgrove Primary School, Kidsgrove
- Kidsgrove Secondary School, Kidsgrove
- Madeley High School, Madeley
- The Meadows Primary Academy, Stoke-on-Trent
- The Meadows Primary School, Madeley
- The Orme Academy, Newcastle-under-Lyme
- Pine Green Academy, Wolverhampton
- St Andrew's Academy, Derby
- St Martins School, Derby
- Saxon Hill Academy, Lichfield
- Seabridge Primary School, Newcastle-under-Lyme
- Streethay Primary School, Lichfield
- Tottington High School, Tottington
- Unsworth Academy, Unsworth
- Walton Hall Academy, Eccleshall
- The Westleigh School, Leigh
- Woodhey High School, Ramsbottom

== Justice services ==
From January 2010, the NOMS European Social Fund co-financing programme worked with offenders across England. National Offender Management Service (NOMS) is an executive agency of the Ministry of Justice, which brings together the Probation Service and Prison Service. A key objective for NOMS is the reduction of re-offending.

In 2015, the government announced the outcome of NOMS tender opportunities to work with offenders. Shaw Trust formed an alliance with Crime Reduction Initiatives for a number of the tender opportunities and was to work with offenders in the East of England, London, West Midlands, North East and the South West.

== Mergers ==
=== Careers Development Group ===
The Careers Development Group was a workfare organisation and Work Programme provider in the United Kingdom.

Pursuing a goal of providing a helping hand to needy and jobless people, Careers Development Group had been working for over three decades. According to their records, in 2011/12, the organization helped over 30,000 people into jobs. As well as their work programme, young people from South London had received support from the organization in job placement in social and charity enterprises.

CDG group advocated: "A society in which everyone has the opportunity for employment, inclusion and independence". Hence, CDG not only provided jobs but also prepared people by imparting training for better placements. Their charity work included support for those with disabilities, health problems and lack of experience.

In 2012, CDG merged with Shaw Trust.

=== Prospect Services ===
Prospects was a welfare-to-work company in the United Kingdom that provided education, employment, training and care products and services. Prospects worked with over 500,000 clients each year, mainly in England and Wales. It employed more than 1,400 staff, achieving Leader in Diversity status in 2016 and was ranked in the top 100 index by the National Centre for Diversity.

Prospects was responsible for the delivery of the Work Programme, a workfare scheme. The company was a prime contractor for the Work Programme in the south-west of England and a subcontractor in Bristol and London.
