= Chesterton Castle =

Motte-and-bailey castle in Shropshire, England

- Staffordshire, England

Site information
- Type: Motte-and-bailey castle

Site history
- Built: Before 1180
- Materials: Timber
- Demolished: 16th century

Chesterton Castle was a motte-and-bailey castle in Chesterton, Staffordshire, England which has no surviving remains existing today.

== History ==
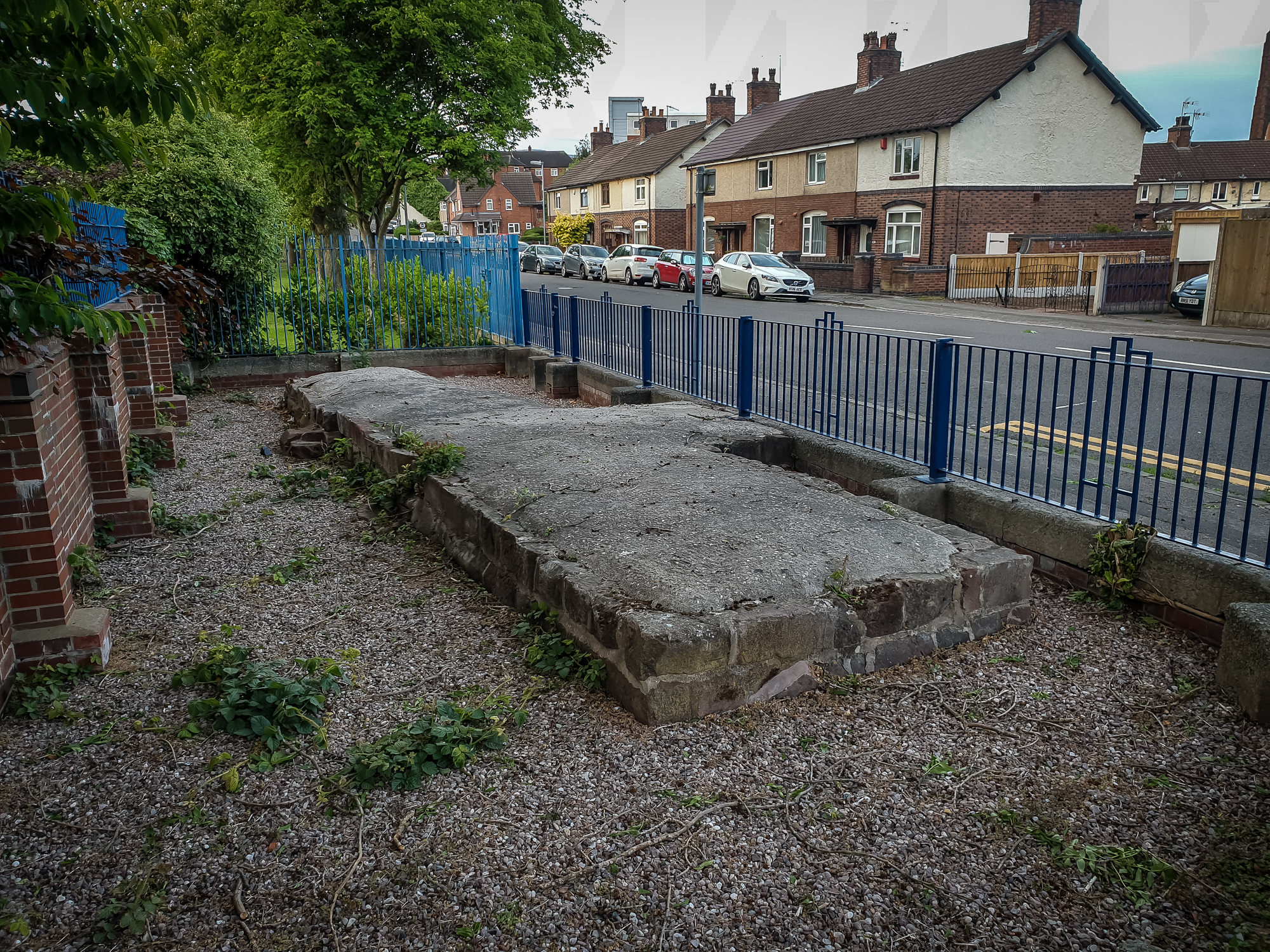
Newcastle-under-Lyme Castle (pictured here) replaced Chesterton Castle during the early 12th century.

Chesterton Castle was built probably atop the mound of a former Anglo-Saxon burh and it is known that Robert de Beaumont, 3rd Earl of Leicester owned the timber castle in 1180. Additions were made to the castle shortly before King John visited in 1206.

It was usurped by Newcastle-under-Lyme Castle when the town of the same name grew up around the castle during the 12th and 13th centuries. In 1267, King Henry III seized the property alongside the manor of Newcastle from the Earl of Leicester, granting it to his younger son, Edmund Crouchback.

The ruins were demolished during the 16th century, and the site is today unknown.
