= Werrington, Staffordshire =

Village in Staffordshire, England

Coordinates: 53°01′29″N 02°05′14″W

Werrington
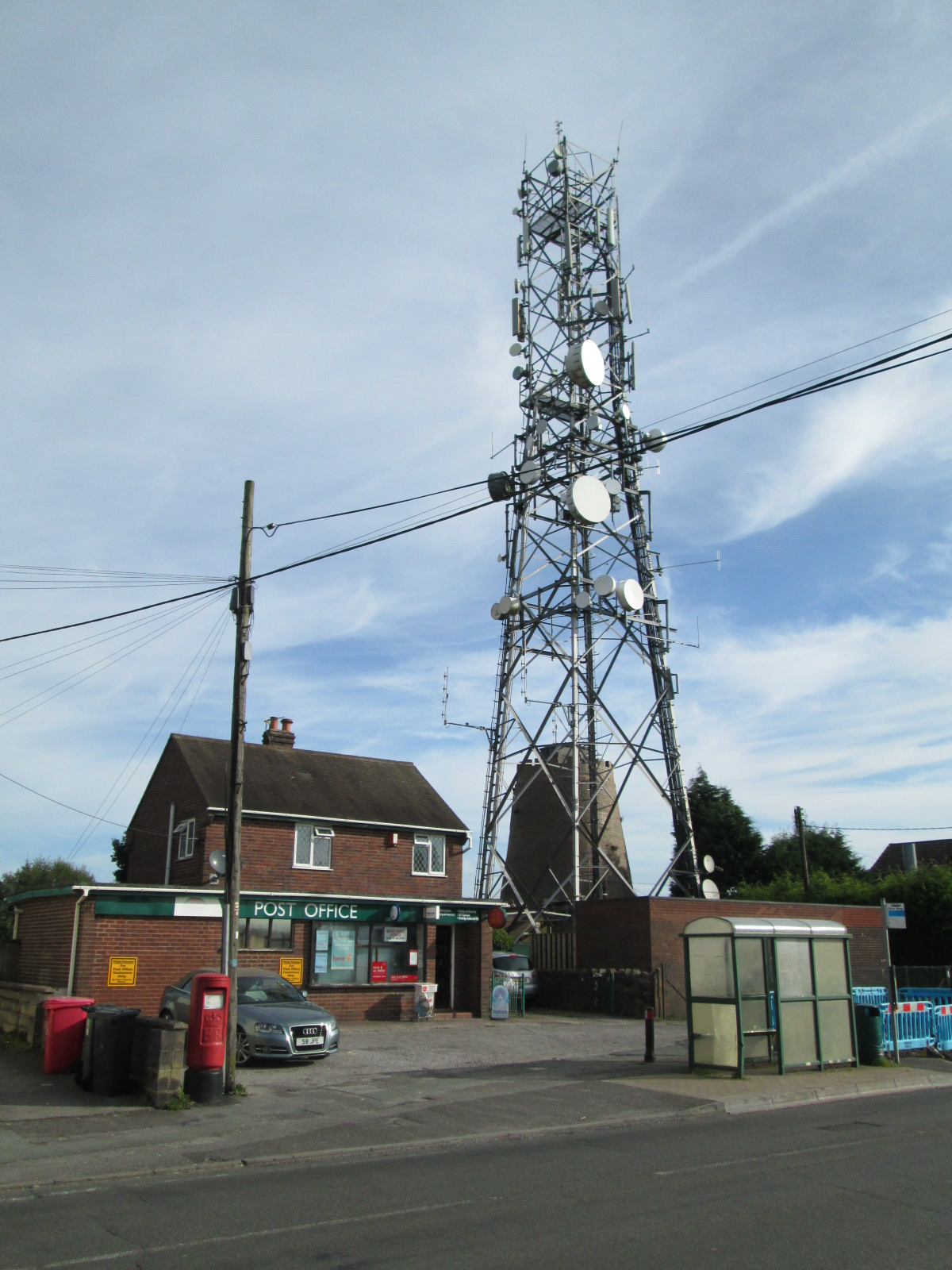
- Windmill and telecommunications tower, Werrington

- Location within Staffordshire
- Population: 3,176 (2019)
- OS grid reference: SJ9403147560
- District: Staffordshire Moorlands
- Shire county: Staffordshire
- Region: West Midlands
- Country: England
- Sovereign state: United Kingdom
- Post town: STOKE-ON-TRENT
- Postcode district: ST9
- Dialling code: 01782
- Police: Staffordshire
- Fire: Staffordshire
- Ambulance: West Midlands
- UK Parliament: Staffordshire Moorlands

Werrington is a village in the Staffordshire Moorlands district of Staffordshire, England, about 5 miles (8 km) east of Stoke-on-Trent city centre. The village has a population of just over 3,000 people, sits at 875 feet (270 m) above sea level and is known for its windmill standing at the summit. It is surrounded by Wetley Moor, a Site of Special Scientific Interest, and has the A52 road running through the middle of the village.

The village was first recorded on a map under the name of Wherington in 1749, shortly after the construction of the windmill. The windmill was in use for around 150 years, grinding corn and then coal towards the end of its working life. The village's population has grown more than tenfold since 1925, warranting its own parish council in 1988. Moorside High School and HM Prison Werrington sit within the village, as do a number of listed buildings and two churches.

== History ==
Werrington was first recorded on a 1749 map under the name Wherington, and it was not spelt as Werrington until 1890.

The windmill at the top of the village is believed to have been constructed in 1730. It was described as "a powerful corn mill consisting of four pairs of mill stones and one flour machine" when advertised for sale in 1804. It stopped grinding corn by the end of the century, though would instead be used to grind coal to make briquettes. By 1905 it was used only to serve as a stand for a small turbine, which generated electricity for the public house next door. During World War II the local home guard based their headquarters there. It now houses communication equipment after being bought by the Midlands Electricity Board in 1952, and is now owned by E.ON. It remains the last remaining windmill in the Staffordshire Moorlands after Dilhorne's windmill disappeared by the year 1900.

Werrington originally consisted primarily of the windmill and a small number of houses in the immediate vicinity. Rapid expansion began in 1925 to expand into Washerwall, parts of Wetley Common, Withystakes, Ash Bank, Armshead, Cellarhead, and some of Brookhouse Lane. In the 90 years since then the population increased from a few hundred to several thousand with the addition of some 2,500 homes. This growth began at a time when the Meigh family sold off the Ash Hall estate and the village was connected to nearby transport, electricity, gas, water, and sewerage services.

== Governance ==
Werrington was a part of the parish of Caverswall, before it split off in 1988 after having become large enough to justify running its own parish council. The village hall was opened in 1938 and now serves as the home of a children's playgroup and the meeting place for the local parish council. The village hall was built at a cost of £1,100 in September 1937 following a six-year fundraising period.

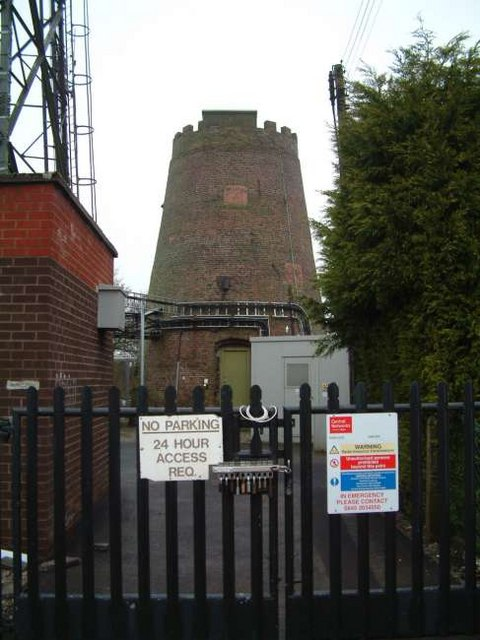
The windmill in a view unobstructed by the telecommunications tower.

== Geography ==
Ash Bank village lies westerly down the A52 road between Werrington and the Stoke-on-Trent district of Bucknall. The hamlet of Hulme lies to the south. The A52 is bisected by the A520 road, which travels north through the village of Wetley Rocks and onto the market town of Leek. Travelling south on the A520 one reaches the A50 road in the Stoke-on-Trent district of Meir. Werrington is surrounded by Wetley Moor, which at its highest point reaches 900 ft above sea level. Wetley Moor now makes up 173 acres (70 ha) of open common and around 90 acres (40 ha) of enclosed pots. The moor is made up of wet heath and consists of heather and other related vegetation. It is designated as a Site of Special Scientific Interest (SSSI) as it lies on lower lying coal measures, which gives it a wet peaty soil.

== Demography ==
According to the Office for National Statistics, the village's total population stood at 3,176 persons in 2019. The 2011 United Kingdom census revealed the average age to be 45, with 96.4% of residents born in England and only 1.8% born outside of the United Kingdom. In terms of religion, 76.5% reported themselves to be Christian, 17.5% cited no religion, whilst 5.5% did not answer the question. The census revealed a balanced list of economic activities as the following sectors represented between 8.1 and 15.1% of all occupations: skilled trades; professional; administrative and secretarial; associate professional and technical; managers, directors and senior officials; administrative; caring, leisure and other service; elementary; elementary administration and service; sales and customer service.

== Economy ==
HM Prison Werrington, known as Werrington Juvenile Centre, was opened as an Industrial school in 1870. The school had just two pupils when it first opened, but would house 104 inmates by 1881. It was made into an Approved school in 1933 and was converted into a detention centre in 1957. The prison became a Young Offenders Institute in 1983. The institute has been gradually expanded over the years, reaching a size of 160 inmates in 2008, all aged between 15 and 18.

The Armshead Quarry, located on the Wetley Moor, was closed around 1955. It was used to quarry sandstone, which was blasted out from the rock face. At least one other quarry operated in Washerwall, with other past industries including coal mining, weaving and nail making. Coal mining dates in the area back to at least the 18th century, with notable flurries of activity occurring during miners' strikes in 1921 and 1926. Salter's Lane Colliery Co. Ltd operated between 1960 and 1975, and were given approval to mine in the village in February 1970. The last mine operating in Werrington was sunk in 1956, running until its closure in March 1983. Though these industries have fallen away, the area still maintains some number of farms.

== Landmarks ==
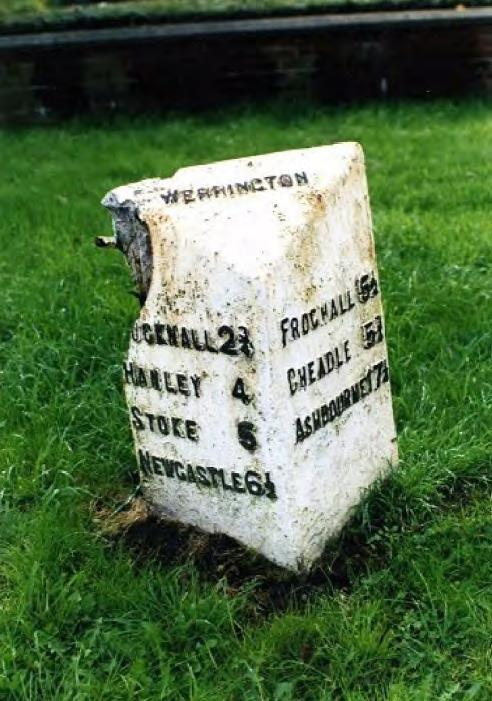
A cast iron milepost on the A52 road.

In addition to the windmill, there is a point known as 'Dead Mans Grave', which is thought to be a boundary marker stone assembled to mark the boundary of the Stoke and Caverswall parishes in a document from 1689. The Dead Mans Grave sits at the junction of Draw Well Lane and Armshead Road, and earned its name due to an urban legend that it is the headstone of a murdered man. The post, designated a Grade II listed structure, stands at 4 feet 9 inches (1.45 m) tall and is made of millstone grit.

There is a well on Washerwall Lane, supplied by a spring, that was used since at least 1775 until the mid-19th century. As well as providing the villagers with fresh water, water carts took the water to nearby towns for a price of one halfpenny a bucket. Around 1810, plans were drawn up to pipe the water into Hanley, though were not followed through. A stone structure was erected around the natural spring in 1874 bearing the mark of the S.R.S.A. (Staffordshire Rural Sanitary Authority).

== Transport ==
The A52 road connects Bucknall with Cellarhead; the original road was opened around 1765.

== Education ==
Moorside High School was opened under the name Cellarhead County Modern School in 1939. Werrington County Primary School was opened in 1995 following an amalgamation of Saltway Junior and Werrington Infants schools. The village has its own library, run by volunteers.

== Religious sites ==
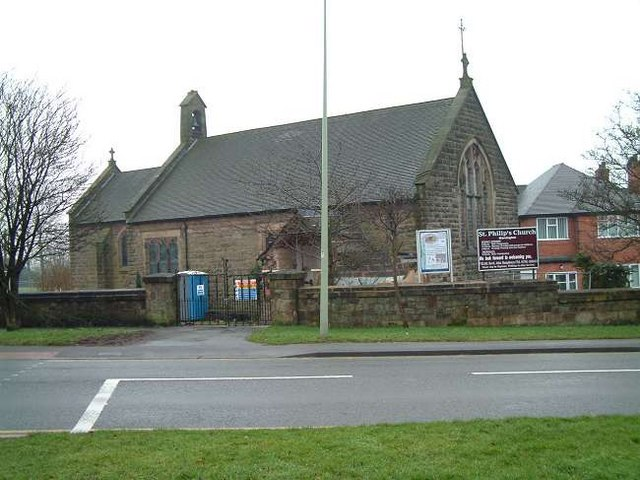
St. Philip's Church, seen from the northwest

Werrington is home to two churches. The Anglican church, St. Philip's, was constructed from mostly local stone and was dedicated by the Bishop of Lichfield upon its completion in June 1907. The construction was funded by the local community following a decade-long fundraising effort. The Carnegie Trust gave a grant of £200 to help fund the cost of the organ. The church was consecrated in 1965. Extensive modifications were carried out in 2007. Werrington Methodist Church is located on Ash Bank Road. A number of Methodist churches were built and demolished in the village's history, with the current one opened in 1938 following a 20-year fundraising effort of £5,100. Hugh Bourne, one of the joint founders of Primitive Methodism, was born at nearby Ford Hayes Farm, Bucknall in 1772.

== Notable people ==
- Phil Taylor (born 1960), 16-times winner of the World Professional Darts Championship, lives in Werrington.
- Adam Yates (born 1983), former footballer, grew up in the village; he played 439 games.
