= The Meadows School, Leek =

The Meadows School

Location
- Springfield Road; Leek, Staffordshire, ST13 6EU; England
- Coordinates: 53.10723°N 2.00986°W

Information
- Type: Special school; Academy
- Local authority: Staffordshire
- Trust: Manor Hall Academy Trust
- Department for Education URN: 143346 Tables
- Ofsted: Reports
- Headteacher: Christopher Best
- Gender: Mixed
- Age: 11 to 19
- Enrolment: 124 as of December 2020
- Website: themeadows.manorhall.academy

The Meadows School is a mixed special school co-located with Leek High School in Leek, Staffordshire, England.

In 2014 Ofsted said "Students make good progress because teachers, and other staff, know them well and have high expectations of what can be achieved. In the best lessons, students are fully engaged in exciting activities which stimulate and fully involve them. As a result, students work enthusiastically and are expected to achieve as well as they can".

Previously a community school administered by Staffordshire County Council, in October 2016 The Meadows School converted to academy status. The school is now sponsored by the Manor Hall Academy Trust.
