= Stafford Collegiate =

School partnership in Stafford, England

The Stafford Collegiate is a partnership of several state schools based within the Stafford catchment area. The collaborating institutes include: Blessed William Howard Catholic High School, King Edward VI High School, Stafford Manor High School, Sir Graham Balfour High School and Weston Road Academy.

The partnership offers a large range of courses. both academic and vocational, a total of some 40 A level subjects, eight courses leading to vocational qualifications, a general education programme, moreover, some offer the opportunity to improve GCSE grades.

Since its formation, the Chetwynd Centre has played the role of head of the collegiate, offering courses only to sixth form students at participating schools. Steve Smith, Collegiate Manager, heads the Stafford Collegiate and is the head of the collaboration.
