= Moorside High School, Werrington =

Moorside High School

Location
- Cellarhead Road; Werrington, Staffordshire, ST9 0HP; England
- Coordinates: 53.026942°N 2.069442°W

Information
- Type: Academy
- Motto: Engage and Achieve
- Established: 1939
- Local authority: Staffordshire
- Department for Education URN: 148508 Tables
- Ofsted: Reports
- Principal: Darryn Robinson
- Gender: Coeducational
- Age: 11 to 16
- Enrolment: 821 as of July 2020
- Capacity: 781
- Website: https://www.moorside.staffs.sch.uk/

Moorside High School is a coeducational secondary school located in Werrington, Staffordshire.

== History ==
The school was opened in 1939 under the name Cellarhead County Modern School.

Previously a community school administered by Staffordshire County Council, in April 2021 Moorside High School converted to academy status. The school is now sponsored by the Potteries Educational Trust.

The school was the subject of a report in the local press in 2022 claiming that it had instituted draconian uniform rules and was isolating many pupils for minor infringements.

== Inspection results ==
Year	Standard
2008	Satisfactory
2011	Good
2015	Requires Improvement
2017	Good
