= Leek High School =

Secondary school in Staffordshire, England

Location
- Springfield Road; Leek, Staffordshire, ST13 6EU; England, United Kingdom; 53.10723°N 2.00986°W

Information
- School type: Academy Converter
- Local authority: Staffordshire County Council
- Trust: The Talentum Learning Trust
- Department for Education URN: 142711 Tables
- Ofsted: Reports
- Head teacher: Kevin Graham
- Staff: 42 (2026)
- Secondary years taught: Year 9 to Year 13
- Gender: Mixed
- Age: 13 to 18 Years
- Enrollment: 266* (2026) (2020)
- Capacity: 665
- Houses: The school no longer has houses as of 2026
- Website: https://www.lhs.ttlt.org.uk

Leek High School is a mixed upper school (termed 'high school') located in Leek, Staffordshire, England. As of 2021, the number of students at the school is 373, including the sixth form, but capacity is 665.

Previously a foundation school administered by Staffordshire County Council, the school converted to academy status in April 2016, joining The Talentum Learning Trust. The school continues to coordinate with Staffordshire County Council for admissions. The school shares part of the site with The Meadows School, a mixed special school.

The school operates a joint sixth form with Westwood College, Post 16 sixth form. Classes for sixth formers operate at both sites.

Many parts of the Movie "The tale of the hole in the garden" were filmed on the school grounds.

== History ==
=== Grammar school ===
Leek High School originally opened in 1900 as a co-educational secondary school located within the Nicholson Institute. It expanded throughout the twenty years following until 1921 when the girls were transferred to Westwood Hall. In 1939, the boys were transferred to a new building in Westwood Road.

==== Notable Past Teachers ====
Miss Craig - Left in 2026

Mr Fnyaftt - Left in late 2025

=== Comprehensive ===
In 1965, the school was merged with the two secondary modern schools in Springfield Road, Mountside Boys' School and Milner Girls' School, to form a mixed comprehensive secondary school, with the Westwood Road building renamed as the Warrington Hall.

With the introduction of three-tier education in the late 1970s, the school moved all pupils to Springfield Road, extended the buildings with the addition of an eight laboratory science block and became a high school, with the Warrington hall becoming St Edwards Middle School.

The school achieved Specialist Technology College status in 2004.

== Notable former pupils ==
=== Leek High School for Boys ===
- Air Chief Marshal Michael Knight, Commander from 1973-74 of RAF Laarbruch
