= Weston Road Academy =

The Weston Road Academy

Location
- Blackheath Lane; Stafford, Staffordshire, ST18 0YG; England; 52°48′51″N 2°04′31″W

Information
- Type: Academy
- Motto: Opening Minds
- Established: 1979
- Local authority: Staffordshire
- Department for Education URN: 137553 Tables
- Ofsted: Reports
- Chair: Andrew Hind
- Head teacher: Ann Kingman
- Staff: 70-80
- Gender: Coeducational
- Age: 11 to 18
- Enrolment: 958
- Colours: Blue & Gold
- Publication: Weston Road News
- Website: http://www.westonroad.staffs.sch.uk/

The Weston Road Academy (formerly Weston Road High School) is an academy school in Stafford, England. It provides secondary and further education for pupils aged 11–18 in the east side of the town, as well as the surrounding villages of Great Haywood, Little Haywood, Hopton, Weston and Hixon. It has links to other local high schools through a local education collaboration - the Stafford Collegiate - which provides education for 16 to 18 year olds.

In 2012 it became an academy school. In recent years, the academy has specialised in mathematics and computing.

As of 2021, the school's most recent Ofsted inspection was a short inspection in 2018, which confirmed the previous 2013 judgement of Good.
