= South Staffordshire College =

Further education college in Staffordshire, England

- Principal: Claire Boliver
- Location: Staffordshire
- Website: www.southstaffs.ac.uk

South Staffordshire College is a further education college located over four sites in Staffordshire, England.

The college was created in 2009 as a result of a merger of Cannock Chase Technical College, Rodbaston College and Tamworth and Lichfield College. It now operates over five sites in Lichfield, Rodbaston (Penkridge), Cannock and 2 campuses in Tamworth. The Cannock campus was closed in July 2017 but re-opened as the Skills and Innovation Hub in August 2018.

South Staffordshire College offers a range of further education courses including NVQs, apprenticeships and access courses. The college also has a higher education provision, with courses offered in conjunction with the University of Staffordshire and the University of Wolverhampton.

The College is a sponsor of The Rural Enterprise Academy, a state-funded secondary school in Penkridge, Staffordshire.

== Campuses ==
- Lichfield Campus, The Friary, Lichfield (52.6799°N 1.8298°W)
- Rodbaston Campus, Penkridge (52.7015°N 2.1172°W)
- Cannock Campus, The Green, Cannock, Staffordshire,
- Tamworth Campus, College Lane, Tamworth.
- Torc Professional and Technical Centre, Silver Link Road, Glascote Heath, Tamworth (52.616565°N 1.6649208°W)
