= Madeley High School =

Coordinates: 53°0′4″N 2°20′18″W

Location
- Newcastle Road; Madeley, Staffordshire, CW3 9JJ; England

Information
- Type: Academy
- Established: 1957
- Trust: Shaw Education Trust
- Department for Education URN: 140154 Tables
- Ofsted: Reports
- Head teacher: Lee Nixon
- Gender: Coeducational
- Age: 11 to 16
- Enrolment: 650
- Capacity: 675
- Houses: Elizabeth, Bennet, Mitchell, Banks, Turing
- Website: madeleyschool.org

Madeley High School, established 1957, is a coeducational secondary school with academy status, located in the village of Madeley, Staffordshire, England. The school was founded as a secondary modern school. It became a comprehensive high school and then a Specialist Technology College with joint second specialisms in Arts and Cognition and Learning, before converting to academy status in September 2013. The school is now sponsored by the Shaw Education Trust.

Madeley School caters to children in the 11-16 age group. It serves mainly the area lying to the west of Newcastle Under Lyme including the communities of Keele, Madeley, Betley, Baldwins Gate, Maer, Aston, Mucklestone, Ashley, Ashley Heath, Knighton, Whitmore, Wrinehill, Almington, Hanchurch, Onneley and Loggerheads and Westlands.

== Notable former pupils ==
- Anthony Bale, medievalist
- Peter Bebb, special effects artist
- Bradley James, actor
- Francesca Mills, actor
- Louis Moult, Striker for Preston North End F.C.
- Nathan Smith, Defender for Port Vale F.C.
