= Newcastle Academy =

Location
- Ostend Place; Newcastle-under-Lyme; Staffordshire, ST5 2QY; England
- Coordinates: 53.00322°N 2.2463°W

Information
- Type: Academy
- Local authority: Staffordshire
- Department for Education URN: 142277 Tables
- Ofsted: Reports
- Principal: Jaime Henshaw
- Gender: Mixed
- Age: 11 to 16
- Website: http://www.newcastleacademy.org/

Newcastle Academy is a mixed secondary school located in Newcastle-under-Lyme in the English county of Staffordshire.

Previously known as Sneyd High School, it was later renamed Newcastle Community High School and then gained Science College status. In October 2015 the school converted to academy status and was renamed Newcastle Academy. The school is now part of Multi-academy trust Windsor Academy Trust, but was formerly part of the United Endeavour Trust, which is now part of WAT.

Newcastle Academy offers GCSEs and BTECs as programmes of study for pupils, with some courses offered in conjunction with Clayton Hall Academy.
