= The Wilnecote School =

Location
- Tinkers Green Road; Wilnecote; Tamworth, Staffordshire, B77 5LF; England; 52.60533°N 1.66477°W

Information
- Type: Academy
- Local authority: Staffordshire
- Trust: Community Academies Trust
- Department for Education URN: 138936 Tables
- Ofsted: Reports
- Headteacher: David Foskett
- Gender: Co-educational
- Age: 11 to 16
- Enrolment: 746 as of September 2020
- Website: https://thewilnecoteschool.com/

The Wilnecote School (formerly Wilnecote High School) is a co-educational secondary school located in Wilnecote (near Tamworth) in the English county of Staffordshire.

Previously a foundation school administered by Staffordshire County Council, Wilnecote High School converted to academy status in September 2012 and became part of the Community Academy Trust in September 2016 changing its name to The Wilnecote School. The school continues to coordinate with Staffordshire County Council for admissions.

The Wilnecote School is also the location of Wilnecote Leisure Centre, a sports and leisure facility that is for the community outside of school hours. It is also home to the Wilnecote Library, open to the public multiple days a week.

The school has undergone multiple facility upgrades in the past few years, mainly IT upgrades and upgrades to some of the science rooms.

== Notable former pupils ==
- Jack Manuel, cricketer
- Stinson Hunter, filmmaker and online activist
