= Blackfriars Academy =

Special school in Staffordshire, England

Location
- Newcastle-under-Lyme/Bucknall, Staffordshire; England; 53.00824°N 2.23181°W

Information
- Type: Special school; Academy
- Established: 1960
- Local authority: Staffordshire
- Trust: Shaw Education Trust
- Department for Education URN: 141448 Tables
- Ofsted: Reports
- Gender: Mixed
- Age: 5 to 19
- Website: http://www.bcfederation.co.uk/

Blackfriars Academy (formerly Blackfriars School) is a mixed special school of approximately 200 pupils, covering an age range of 11 to 19, with a range of physical, learning, medical and sensory needs who come from North and Central Staffordshire and the Unitary Authority of Stoke-on-Trent. The school is based in Newcastle-Under-Lyme, Staffordshire, England. It has a swimming pool on campus.

== History ==
Blackfriars Academy opened in September 1960. It was granted High Performing Specialist Status in February 2006. One of the first Beacon Schools, the school is also part of the Leading Edge Partnership programme. It is also integrated into the community due to its Technology College status. In October 2014, the school converted to academy status as part of the Shaw Education Trust, and the school was then renamed Blackfriars Academy.

== Staffing ==
The school's teams of staff consist of teachers, teaching assistants, physiotherapists, speech therapists, medical and social agencies and ancillary staff. The total staff is 90.

== Notable former pupils ==
- Denise Leigh, winner of Channel 4's Operatunity
- Paul Henshall, actor
