= Stafford Manor High School =

Location
- Wolverhampton Road; England, Staffordshire, ST17 9DJ; United Kingdom
- 52.78553°N 2.11734°W

Information
- Type: Foundation school
- Local authority: Staffordshire
- Department for Education URN: 124467 Tables
- Ofsted: Reports
- Head teacher: Rhys Adams
- Gender: Mixed
- Age: 11 to 18
- Enrolment: 373
- Capacity: 600
- Colours: Black and red
- Website: http://www.staffordmanorhighschool.com/

Stafford Manor High School is a mixed secondary school and sixth form located in Stafford in the English county of Staffordshire.

Previously known as Rising Brook High School, the school gained specialist Sports College status and was renamed Stafford Sports College. Today Stafford Manor High School is a foundation school administered by Staffordshire County Council and The Stafford Community Learning Trust.

Stafford Manor High School offers GCSEs and vocational courses as programmes of study for pupils. The school sixth form provision forms part of the Stafford Collegiate which includes all Stafford secondary schools and Stafford College.
