= Landau Forte Academy QEMS =

Location
- Ashby Road; Tamworth, Staffordshire, B79 8AJ; England; 52°38′29″N 1°41′34″W

Information
- Type: Academy
- Motto: Courage Compassion Curiosity
- Established: 1588; 438 years ago (Refounded in 1588 as The Grammar School of Elizabeth, Queen of England, in Tamworth. In existence from before 1384 as Tamworth Free Grammar School.)
- Specialist: Music
- Department for Education URN: 137146 Tables
- Ofsted: Reports
- Principal: Katie Adams
- Gender: Mixed
- Age: 11 to 16
- Enrolment: 840
- Houses: Freville; Guy; Offa; Peel
- Colours: Blue and Red
- Website: www.lfatq.org.uk

Landau Forte Academy QEMS (Formerly "Queen Elizabeth's Mercian School", until 1 September 2011) is an 11–16 secondary school with academy status located to the north of Tamworth, a market town in Staffordshire in the Midlands north of Birmingham. It is often known simply as QEMS (pronounced "quems"). Since 1 September 2011, the school has been owned and operated by the Landau Forte Charitable Trust, after being transferred from the Staffordshire LA control.

It is situated in Perrycrofts, on the eastern side of the A513, at the junction with the B5493 (former A453), around a half-mile north of Tamworth town centre.

== Specialist status ==
As a state school, it was awarded specialist status to teach as a Music College. QEMS gained status as a Specialist Music College, under the UK Government's Specialist Schools scheme, in 2005. This specialist status also gives funding to other departments, most notably ICT.

== History ==
=== Queen Elizabeth's Grammar School ===
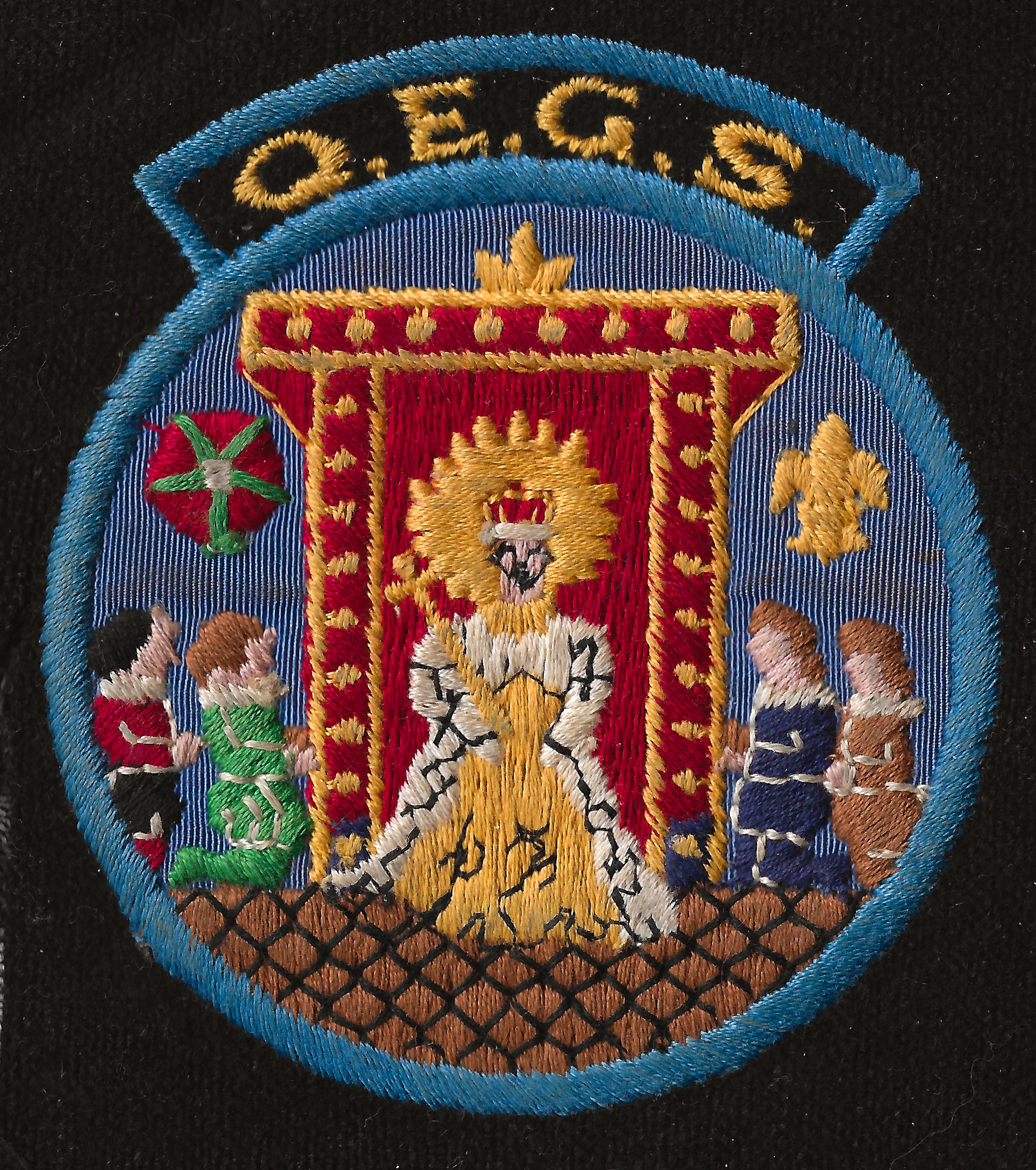
QEGS Sixth Form Badge

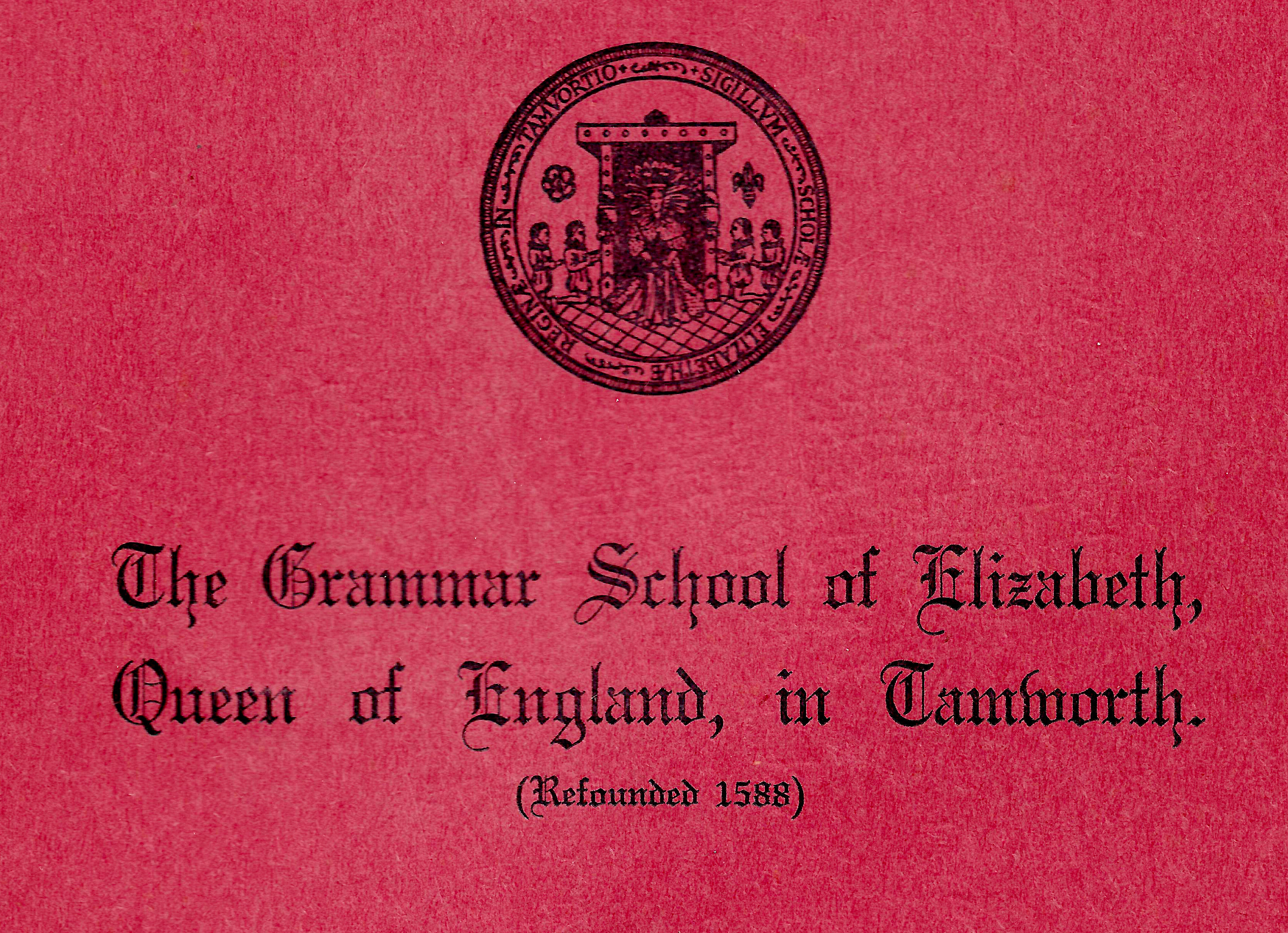
Front cover of a school report book, QEGS, Tamworth (1960-70s)

A school may have existed in Tamworth since the refounding of the Church of St Editha by the Saxon King Edgar around the year 960 thus perhaps making QEGS (QEMS) one of the eight oldest schools in England. Tamworth's Grammar School is documented as being in existence in 1384 and Queen Elizabeth the First refounded the school in the second charter that she granted to the town in 1588, the school was to be known as the Free Grammar School of Elizabeth Queen of England in Tamworth. The official name of the school became The Grammar School of Elizabeth, Queen of England in Tamworth and was known to its pupils and staff as QEGS before its amalgamation and name change in 1979. In the mid 20th century QEGS developed a notable reputation for academic excellence and achievement under its then headmaster Mr B Baker MA.

It was the Queen Elizabeth Grammar School on Ashby Road, it became a co-educational grammar school when it amalgamated with Tamworth Girls High School in 1960.

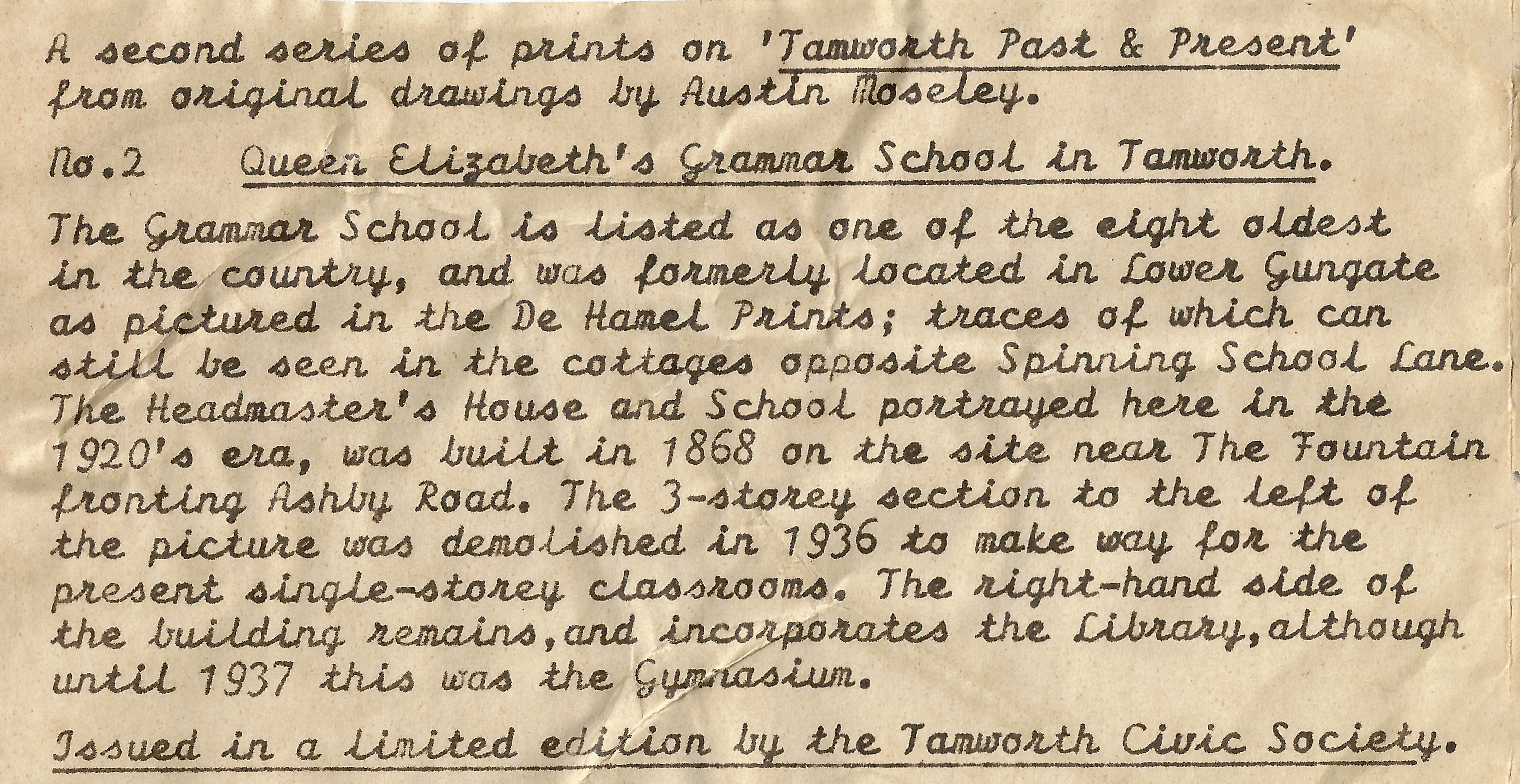
Description of drawing of QEGS,

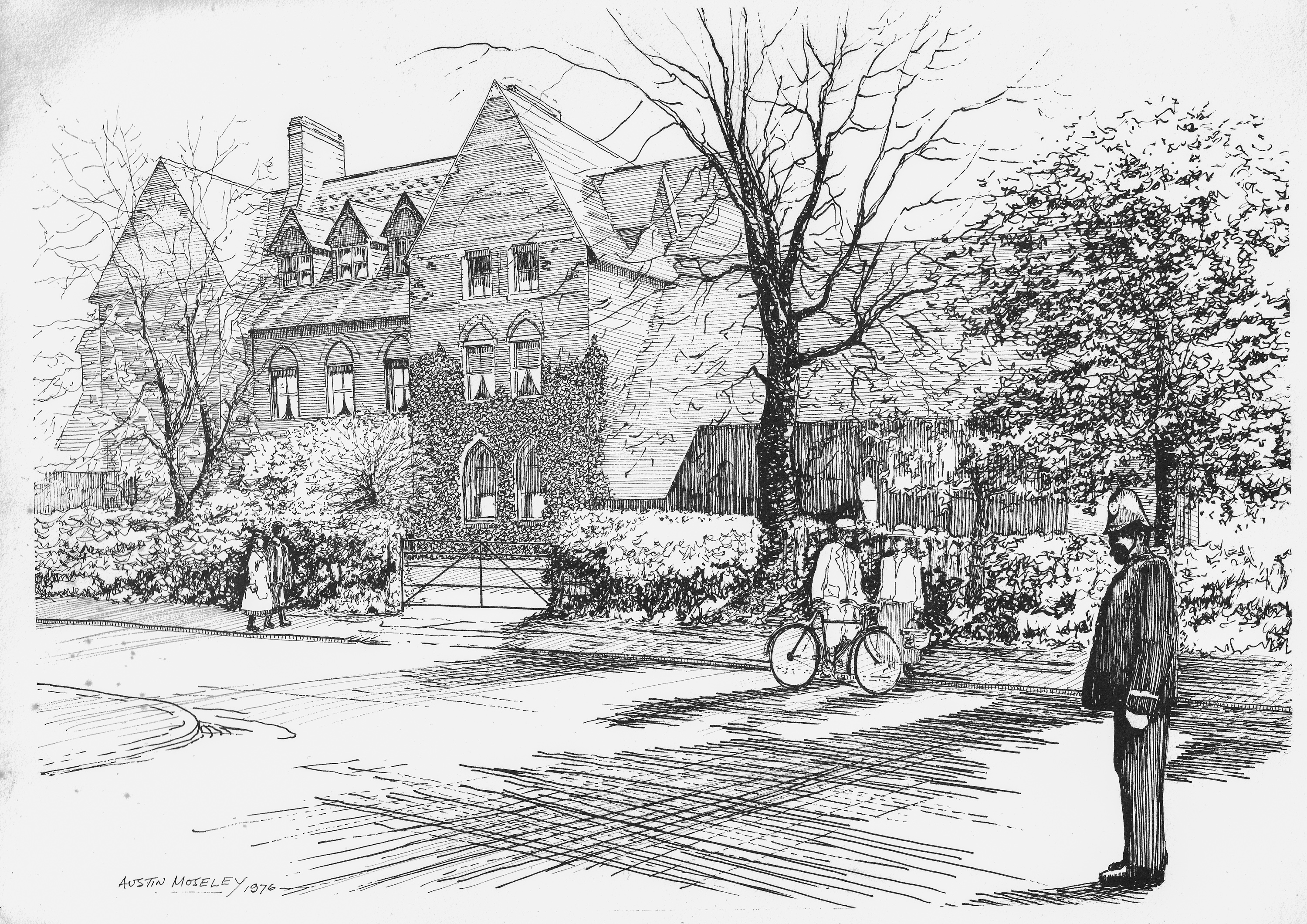
QEGS Drawing.

=== Comprehensive ===
It became a comprehensive in 1979, merging with Mercian Boys' School, a secondary modern school which moved from Hospital Street in 1960, and The Perrycrofts Girls School. The school was renamed Queen Elizabeth's Mercian School (QEMS), a combination of the two schools' names. The "Mercian" in the school name recalls that in the ninth century Tamworth was the capital of the ancient Anglo-Saxon kingdom of Mercia.

In April 2008, two teachers and seven pupils were injured by a bottle of silicon tetrachloride.

=== Arson ===
In November 2004, a 16-year boy was convicted of arson and sentenced for four years at Stafford Crown Court. He started a fire at the school on Sunday 13 April 2003, causing £1.73 million in damage. Petrol had been poured through a window of room 353 to start the fire. Chase Terrace Technology College had been burnt down the year before, costing £8 million. Six fire engines were in attendance, from Staffordshire Fire and Rescue Service and Warwickshire Fire and Rescue Service, with fifty firemen. Six classrooms and an assembly hall were destroyed.

=== Former teachers ===
- Prof Geoffrey Bullough, Professor of English Language and Literature from 1946–1968 at King's College London (taught English from 1924–1926)
- Graham Parsons studied composition under Karlheinz Stockhausen in Cologne, Germany (taught Music 1970–1975).

== Campus ==
QEMS is based in several buildings across the school. Overall, there are five buildings (Sixth Form, QEMS, Middle Block, DT Block, Sports Hall,) and mostly each department is based in one of the buildings.

=== Building Schools for the Future (BSF) ===
Along with all of the other secondary schools in Tamworth, QEMS was due to be rebuilt under the Government's BSF scheme. The addition of a Sixth-Form Academy meant that the size of the QEMS site would have been reduced, and centralised. The first stage of building work was due to begin by March 2010, but was scrapped in July 2010. Nonetheless, the school was transferred to the Landau Forte Charitable Trust's control, effective 1 September 2011, as part of a bid to receive investment from the Government to replace the lost BSF money.

== Alumni ==
- Donald Ross Skinner, songwriter
- Joe Newell, professional footballer

=== The Queen Elizabeth Grammar School ===
- Thomas Guy, Bookseller and founder of Guy's Hospital, London.
- Phil Bennion, Lib Dem MEP from 2012–14 and 2019-20 for the West Midlands
- Dr Reginald Brain, dermatologist
- Sir John Floyer, physician who introduced the practice of measuring a pulse rate
- The Most Reverend Alan Harper, Archbishop of Armagh (Head of the Church of Ireland) from 2007–12
- Colonel Brian Musson Lees LVO OBE OStJ, Soldier, diplomat, arabist. British military attache to Saudi Arabia and Oman. Head of British Defence Intelligence.
- Sir Robert Telford CBE, Managing Director from 1965–81 and Chairman from 1981-84 of the Marconi Company, and President from 1963-64 of the Electronic Engineering Association
- Prof Sir Ernest Titterton CMG FRS, Professor of Nuclear Physics from 1950-81 at the Australian National University, involved in the Manhattan Project
- Prof Terry Wyatt FRS, Particle Physicist
- Patience Wheatcroft, Baroness Wheatcroft, journalist
- Prof Paul Wyatt, Head of the Dept of Drug Development, University of Dundee.
