= High House =

High House may refer to:

in England

- Ancient High House, Stafford
- High House, Purfleet

in the United States

- High House (Denver, Colorado), a Denver Landmark
- High House (Delaware, Ohio), listed on the National Register of Historic Places in Delaware County
- High House (Paris, Texas), listed on the National Register of Historic Places in Lamar County
