= St Chad's Church, Stafford =

Church of St Chad, Stafford
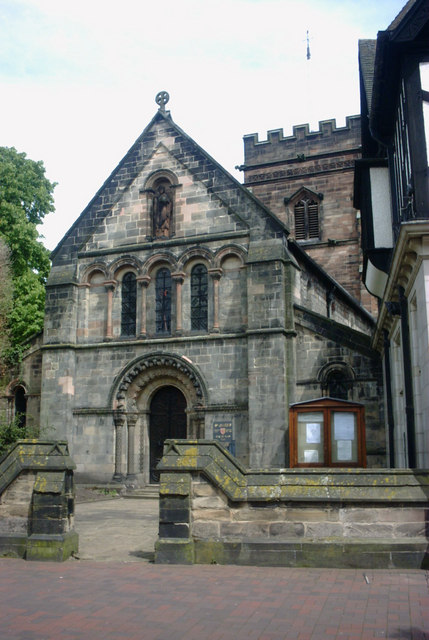
- Church of St Chad, Stafford
- 52°48.3237′N 2°7.0287′W
- OS grid reference: SJ 922 231
- Location: Stafford
- Country: England
- Denomination: Church of England
- Website: http://www.stchadsstafford.co.uk/

History
- Dedication: Saint Chad

Architecture
- Heritage designation: Grade II*
- Designated: 16 Jan 1951
- Style: Norman architecture

Administration
- Diocese: Diocese of Lichfield
- Deanery: Stafford Deanery

St Chad's Church, on Greengate Street in the centre of Stafford, is a Grade II* listed Anglican church. Saint Chad, who died in 672, was the first Bishop of Lichfield. The church was built in the 12th century, and is the oldest building in Stafford.

The church was neglected in the 17th and 18th centuries, and much of the Norman architecture was obscured; there was much restoration work in the mid 19th century, particularly by George Gilbert Scott.

== The original building ==
The building is cruciform and has a crossing tower.

There is an inscription in Latin on the impost at the north-east corner of the crossing: ORM VOCATUR QUI ME CONDIDIT ("He who built me is called Orm"). It is thought that "Orm" is Orm le Guidon, an important landowner in the 11th to 12th century.

The nave is bordered by massive stone columns which have scallop capitals. The columns support four-bay arcades which have chevron decorations on the two eastern arches of each arcade. The crossing arch, at the eastern end of the nave, has chevron decorations, and "beak-heads" on the columns. All these are features of the original Norman building.

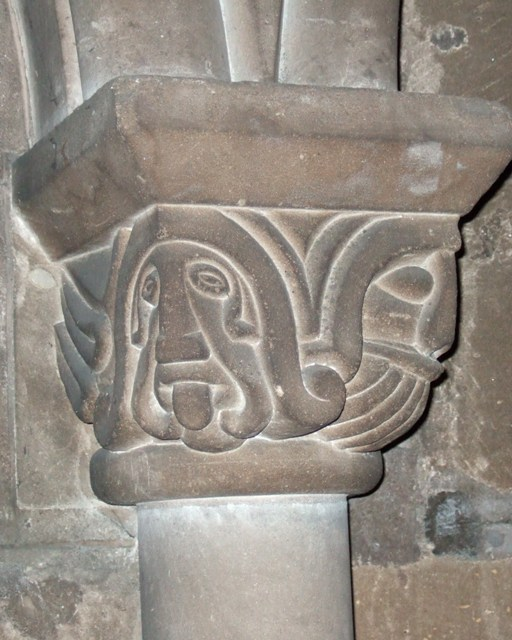
One of the many carved heads and creatures, which are original features of the church; this example is on the south side of the chancel

There are intersecting arches on either side of the chancel; these are original features uncovered during the 1850s restoration. The two windows in the north wall of the chancel have interiors which are the only original window features in the building.

The tower was rebuilt in the 14th century; after this the church became neglected. In the 17th century the original aisles were destroyed, the arcades were bricked up, and the transepts were removed.

== Restoration ==
There was some restoration in the 1740s by Richard Trubshaw, after the west end of the nave collapsed. His work included rebuilding the parapets of the tower and building a new west front, of brick.

In the 1850s some restoration of the chancel was done by Henry Ward of Stafford. Restoration work was continued in the 1870s by George Gilbert Scott: he built a new west front of stone, in Romanesque style, and he opened up the south arcade and built a new aisle on this side. After his death in 1878, work was continued by Robert Griffiths of Stafford, using Scott's designs. From 1880 to 1886 he opened up the north arcade and built a new north aisle; he restored the tower, and the north transept. The south transept was built in the 1950s.

== Furnishings ==
The organ was built by J. Kirkland of London in 1888, and extended by J. J. Binns of Leeds in 1909. It was restored in 1995 by Peter Collins of Melton Mowbray.

The font, in Norman style, was built in 1856. The altarpiece was created in 1910 by Sir Walter Tapper.

The inner porch, the rood-beam and the telescopic cover of the font were designed in the early 20th century by Sir Charles Nicholson, 2nd Baronet.

== See also ==
- Grade II* listed buildings in Stafford (borough)
- Listed buildings in Stafford (Central Area)
