= County Buildings, Stafford =

County building in Staffordshire, England

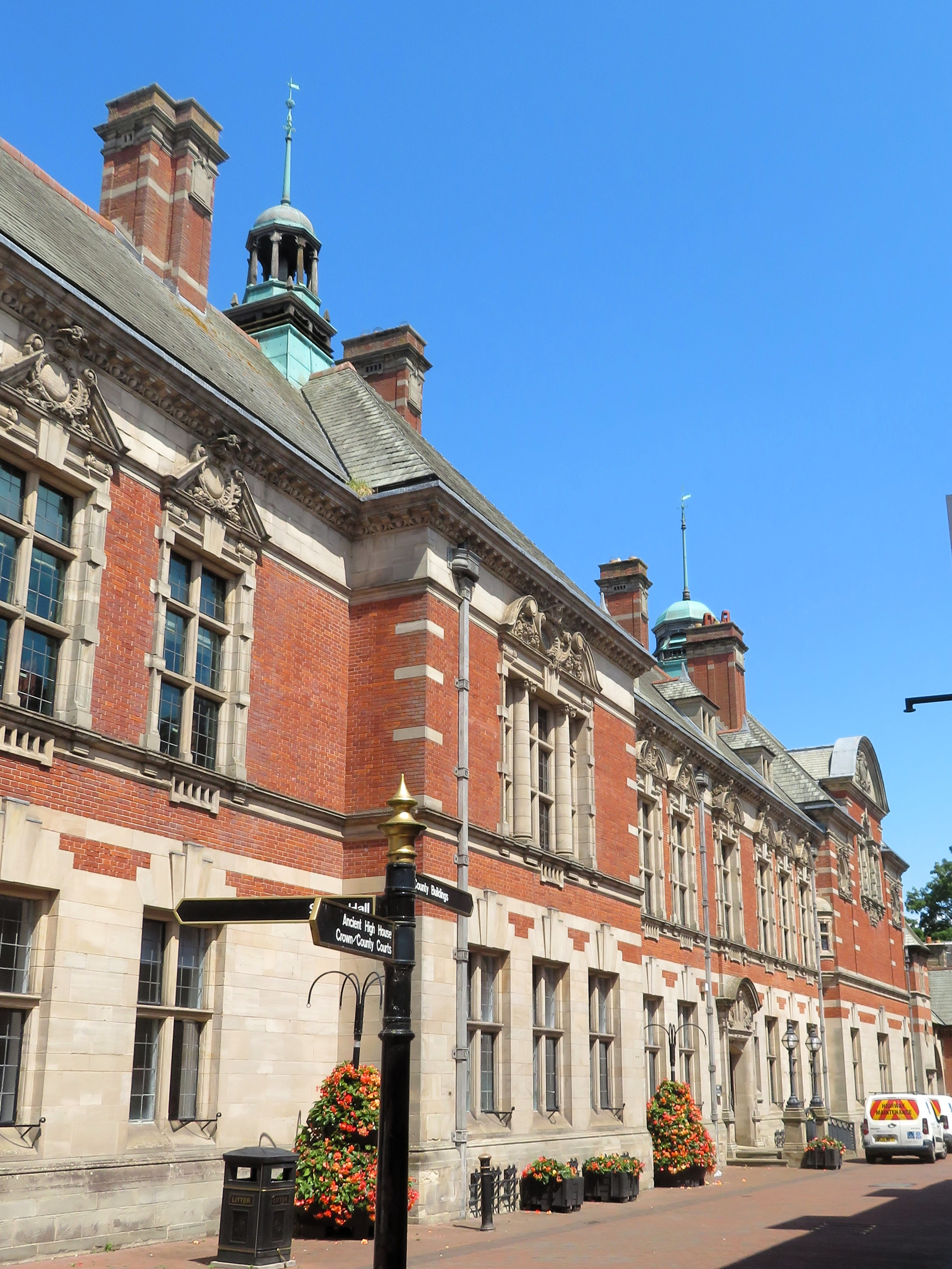
- Martin Street frontage in 2025 from west

- Location within Staffordshire
- 52.8069°N 2.1161°W
- Location: Stafford, Staffordshire

History
- Built: 1895

Site notes
- Architect: Henry Hare
- Architectural style: Baroque revival style

Listed Building – Grade II*
- Designated: 17 December 1971
- Reference no.: 1298178

County Buildings is a municipal facility at Martin Street in Stafford, Staffordshire. The building, which is the meeting place for both Staffordshire County Council and Stafford Borough Council, is a Grade II* listed building.

== History ==
In the 19th century the Shire Hall in Market Square became well established as the venue for judicial meetings and civic functions in the county. Following the implementation of the Local Government Act 1888, which established county councils in every county, there was a need to find offices and a meeting place for Staffordshire County Council. The council initially met at the Shire Hall, but shortly after the council's creation it was decided to procure new county offices: the site they selected in Martin Street immediately adjoined the Shire Hall and had previously been occupied by several a row of retail properties.

The new County Buildings, which were designed by Henry Hare in the Baroque revival style, were completed in 1895. The design involved an asymmetrical main frontage with fifteen bays facing onto the Martin Street; the central section of seven bays featured a doorway with an architrave and segmental pediment with mullioned windows on the first floor. The left hand section, which slightly projected forward, featured a window split by Ionic order columns while the right hand section, which also slightly projected forward, featured a venetian window. Internally, the principal room was the council chamber which featured plasterwork by Frederick Schenck as well as figures sculpted by William Aumonier.

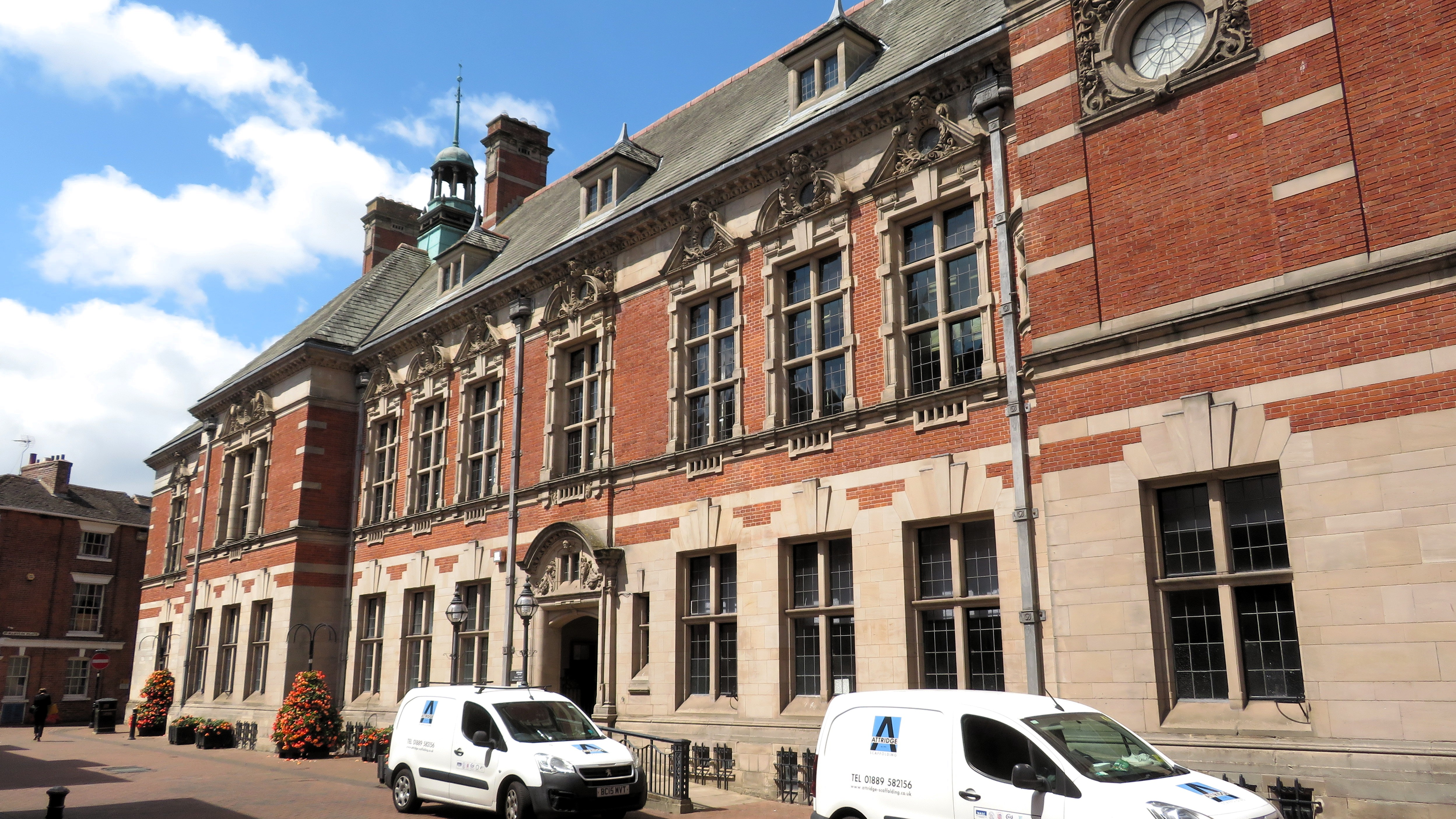
Martin Street frontage from east

Additional offices in a similar style were subsequently built on the opposite southern side of Martin Street in 1913 and 1925.

In April 2009 the council announced plans for a new headquarters in Tipping Street: the new offices were designed by 3DReid, built by Volker Fitzpatrick at a cost of £38 million and completed in October 2011. The new offices were officially opened by the Countess of Wessex as "Staffordshire Place" in May 2013.

Following the departure of council officers and their departments to Staffordshire Place, the later buildings at 15 and 16 Martin Street on the south side of Martin Street were sold and converted into a series of private residences known as "Martin Street Mansions". However, the county council retained the main 1895 building on the north side of Martin Street which contains the main civic rooms, and continued to hold full meetings of the county council in the council chamber there. The civic rooms in County Buildings were also made available for weddings and civil partnerships. The building is also used for full council meetings of Stafford Borough Council, following the sale of the borough council's old Guildhall in the Market Square to become a shopping centre and bank in 1990.

== See also ==
- Grade II* listed buildings in Stafford (borough)
- Listed buildings in Stafford (Central Area)
