= Staffordshire Record Office =

Coordinates: 52°48′25″N 2°06′50″W

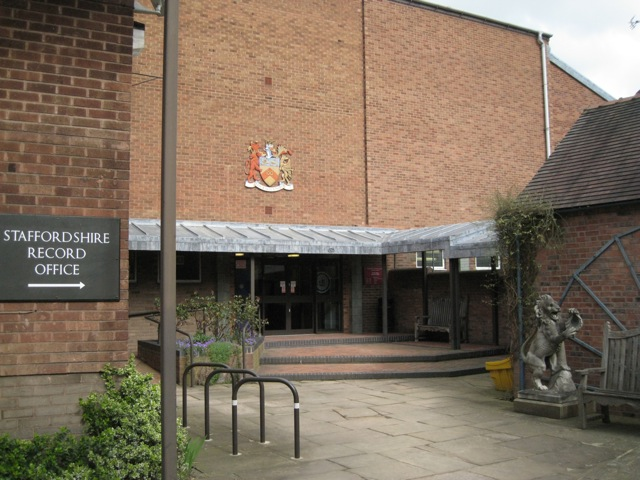
Staffordshire Record Office

Staffordshire Record Office is the county record office for Staffordshire, England. It is run by Staffordshire County Council, and is located in Eastgate Street, Stafford, behind the William Salt Library. Some records are held at the service's offsite store also in Stafford.

It is the principal repository for manuscript records for the county.

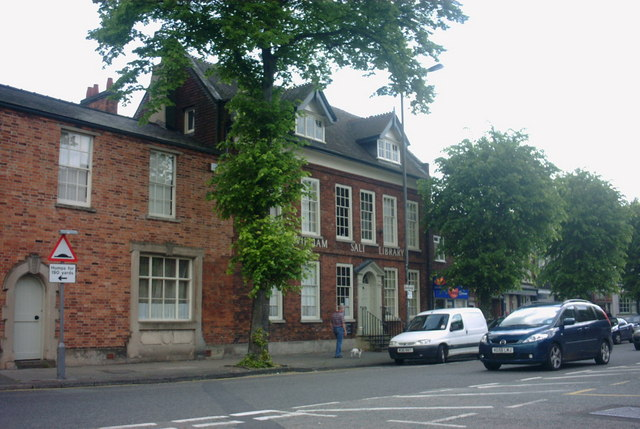
The record office is behind the William Salt Library (right), with which it co-operates.

It is run as a joint service with Stoke-on-Trent as the Staffordshire and Stoke-on-Trent Archive Service. The archives include parish registers, business and colliery records, enclosure awards and maps, manorial records, transport records, and electoral registers.
