= Borough Hall, Stafford =

Municipal building in Stafford, Staffordshire, England

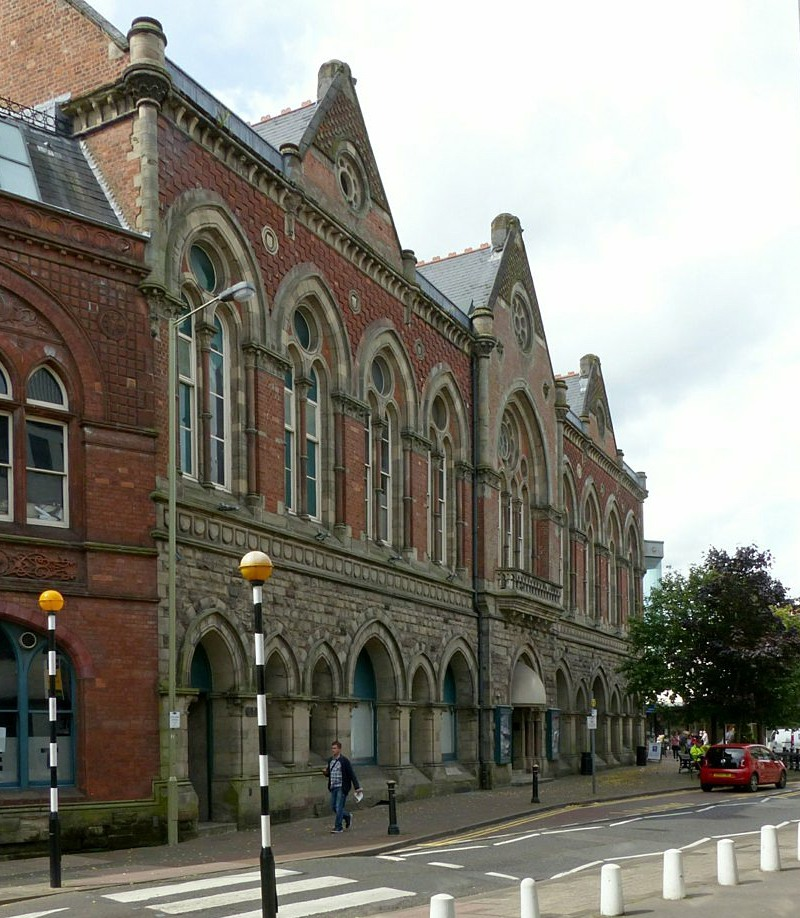
- Borough Hall, Stafford

- Shown in Staffordshire
- 52.8072°N 2.1159°W
- Location: Eastgate Street, Stafford

History
- Built: 1877

Site notes
- Architect: Henry Ward
- Architectural style: Gothic style

Listed Building – Grade II
- Official name: Borough Hall
- Designated: 17 December 1971
- Reference no.: 1195382

The Borough Hall is a municipal building in Eastgate Street, Stafford, Staffordshire, England. The borough hall, which formed the headquarters of Stafford Borough Council, is a Grade II listed building.

== History ==
Until the middle of the 19th century, civic meetings were generally held in the Shire Hall. In 1853 a Guildhall was built on the west side of Market Square which included a council chamber and offices for the borough council as well as a police station. However, by the 1870s the council had outgrown the office space at the guildhall and there was also a need for a large assembly hall. The local board of health decided to procure a dedicated borough hall for the municipal borough of Stafford: the site they selected had previously been occupied by an 18th century warehouse and associated access known as Mathew's Yard.

The building was designed by Henry Ward of Stafford in the Gothic style, built with red brick and stone dressings and was officially opened on 20 June 1877. The design involved a symmetrical main frontage with nine bays facing onto Eastgate Street; the central bay, which slightly projected forward, featured an arched doorway on the ground floor, a stone balcony and four-light tracery window on the first floor and a gable containing two quatrefoils and a wheel window. The left and right sections contained pointed arches of differing sizes on the ground floor with a frieze of shields above and two-light windows with oculi above on the first floor. At roof level these sections featured a modillioned cornice, a parapet and gables containing wheel windows. Internally, there were council offices and a reading room on the ground floor and a large assembly hall on the first floor. Council meetings continued to be held at the council chamber in the Guildhall, which also retained some of the council's offices. The Guildhall was rebuilt in 1935.

In the early 1880s, the reading room on the ground floor of Borough Hall was expanded to incorporate a library and a museum: the latter contained a collection of ethnographic, zoological and geological exhibits established by the meteorologist, Clement Lindley Wragge, before he moved to Australia in 1883. The building was extended by three bays to the south east in 1888: the extension featured terracotta carvings in the tympanum above each of the windows on the first floor. The library and the museum moved out of the borough hall to a dedicated Carnegie library which was established at The Green in 1913, so freeing up additional space in the borough hall for municipal offices.

The borough hall continued to serve as the main offices of the borough council for much of the 20th century and became the main offices of the enlarged Stafford Borough Council when it was formed in 1972, which also used the offices of the former Stafford Rural District council in Newport Road and held its meetings at the Guildhall. Borough Hall ceased to be the local seat of government when the new civic offices were completed on the site of the old Royal Brine Baths in Riverside in 1978.

The borough hall was subsequently refurbished and converted for use as an entertainment venue: it was officially re-opened by the Duke of Gloucester as the Gatehouse Theatre on 27 January 1982.

== See also ==
- Listed buildings in Stafford (Central Area)
