= William Salt Library =

The William Salt Library
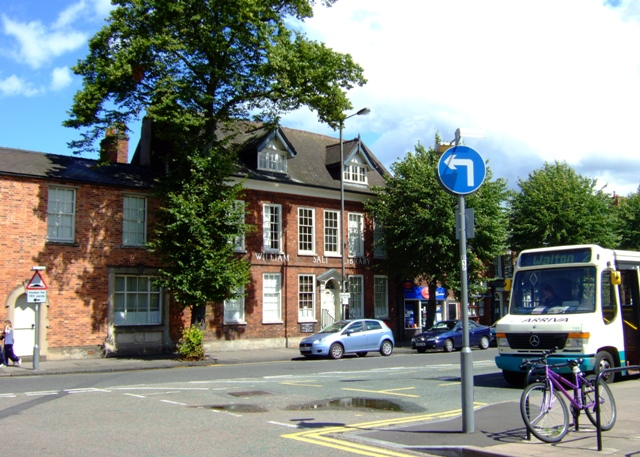
- The Library in 2008
- Interactive map of the The William Salt Library area

General information
- Type: Library
- Architectural style: Georgian
- Location: 19 Eastgate Street, Stafford, England
- Coordinates: 52.8066°N 2.1140°W
- Construction started: 1730
- Completed: 1735
- Owner: Trustees of the William Salt Library

Design and construction
- Designations: Grade II* listed

Website
- www.staffordshire.gov.uk/Heritage-and-archives/williamsalt/home.aspx

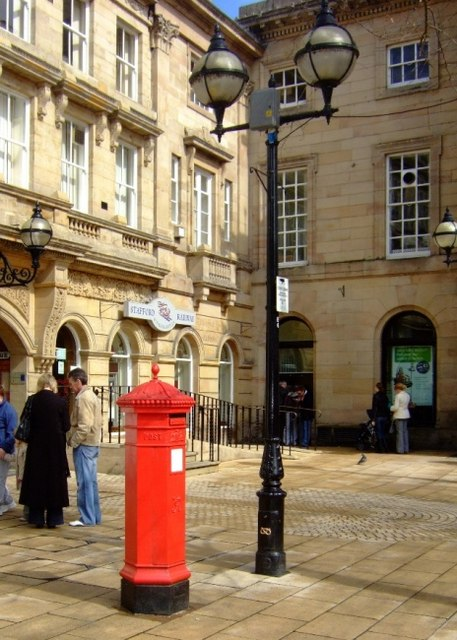
The former library building (left)

The William Salt Library is a library and archive, in Stafford, Staffordshire, England. Supported by Staffordshire County Council, it is a registered charity, administered by an independent trust in conjunction with the Staffordshire & Stoke-on-Trent Archive Service, which also operates the county archives from an adjacent building.

The core of the library is the large collection of printed books, pamphlets, manuscripts, drawings, watercolours, and transcripts built up by William Salt (1808–1863), a London banker. After his death, Helen, his widow donated the collection to Staffordshire and the library opened in 1872. In 1918 moved to its present home in Eastgate Street, a Grade II* listed house completed in 1735. The library continues to collect and preserve printed material relating to Staffordshire and represents a major source for local and family history in Staffordshire. The library's holdings are available for consultation by the public free of charge.

The library is supported by the Friends of the William Salt Library. As well as raising funds for the library to enable it to purchase items for the collection, the Friends also help in practical ways, such as packaging and cleaning items in the collection.

Colin Dexter undertook much of the research for his eighth Inspector Morse novel The Wench is Dead (published in 1989) at the library. Dexter recalled that he spent "a good many fruitful hours in the library" consulting contemporary newspaper reports of the murder of Christina Collins, on which the novel was based. He subsequently became patron of the library's 135th anniversary fund-raising appeal.

== See also ==
- Grade II* listed buildings in Stafford (borough)
- Listed buildings in Stafford (Central Area)
