= Grade II* listed buildings in Stafford (borough) =

There are over 20,000 Grade II* listed buildings in England. This page is a list of these buildings in the district of Stafford in Staffordshire.

== Stafford ==
Name	Location	Type	Completed (Note: The date given is the date used by Historic England as significant for the initial building or that of an important part in the structure's description.)	Date designated	Grid ref. (Note: The grid reference is based on the British national grid reference system, sometimes known as OSGB36, used by the Ordnance Survey.) Geo-coordinates	Entry number (Note: The "List Entry Number" is a unique number assigned to each listed building and scheduled monument by Historic England.)	Image
Church of St Michael and All Angels	Adbaston, Stafford	Church	13th century	15 January 1968	SJ7621927921; 52°50′54″N 2°21′16″W	1116854	Church of St Michael and All Angels More images
Church of St Editha	Church Eaton, Stafford	Church	Late 12th century	15 January 1968	SJ8486817624; 52°45′22″N 2°13′32″W	1319807	Church of St Editha More images
Bishton Hall	Bishton, Colwich, Stafford	Country House	Mid 18th century	17 March 1953	SK0239220701; 52°47′02″N 1°57′58″W	1116588	Bishton Hall More images
Doric Screen Garden Walls Terrace and Parterre Curb North of Bishton Hall	Bishton, Colwich, Stafford	Garden Wall	1840s	21 June 1995	SK0237420865; 52°47′07″N 1°57′58″W	1273003	Upload Photo
Farmhouse of Shugborough Park Farm	Colwich, Stafford	Farmhouse	1803-1806	12 December 1977	SJ9915321864; 52°47′40″N 2°00′50″W	1258625	Farmhouse of Shugborough Park Farm More images
Hay Barn and Cottages to the West of White Barn Farm	Shugborough Estate, Colwich, Stafford	House	Early 19th century	21 October 1988	SJ9886421382; 52°47′24″N 2°01′06″W	1258843	Upload Photo
Parish Church of St Michael and All Angels	Colwich, Stafford	Church	Late 13th century	15 January 1968	SK0108621125; 52°47′16″N 1°59′07″W	1116585	Parish Church of St Michael and All Angels More images
Shepherd's Monument at Shugborough Hall	Colwich, Stafford	Garden Ornament		17 March 1953	SJ9925422643; 52°48′05″N 2°00′45″W	1374124	Shepherd's Monument at Shugborough Hall More images
South Range of Outbuildings of Shugborough Park Farm	Shugborough Park, Colwich, Stafford	Courtyard	1803-1806	12 December 1977	SJ9911121857; 52°47′39″N 2°00′53″W	1273324	Upload Photo
Temple of the Winds at Shugborough Hall to North East of the House	Colwich, Stafford	Garden Temple	18th century	17 March 1953	SJ9917921927; 52°47′42″N 2°00′49″W	1065768	Temple of the Winds at Shugborough Hall to North East of the House More images
Walled Garden and Gardeners Cottage	Shugborough Estate, Colwich, Stafford	Estate Cottage	c. 1806	21 October 1988	SJ9911221659; 52°47′33″N 2°00′53″W	1273250	Walled Garden and Gardeners Cottage More images
White Barn Farm	Shugborough Estate, Colwich, Stafford	House	c. 1806	21 October 1988	SJ9889321358; 52°47′23″N 2°01′04″W	1258842	Upload Photo
Charnes Hall	Wetwood, Eccleshall, Stafford	Country House	Post 1650	10 January 1953	SJ7794033829; 52°54′05″N 2°19′46″W	1039015	Charnes Hall More images
Church of St Chad	Slindon, Eccleshall, Stafford	Church	1894	24 January 1967	SJ8276132216; 52°53′14″N 2°15′28″W	1039048	Church of St Chad More images
Eccleshall Castle	Eccleshall, Stafford	Castle	c. 1695	10 January 1953	SJ8280129557; 52°51′48″N 2°15′25″W	1039062	Eccleshall Castle More images
Range of Outbuildings at West Side of Farmyard flanking Gateway and Range of Cowsheds and Barns on North Side of Farmyard	Gerrards Bromley, Eccleshall, Stafford	Cow House	Late 16th century	24 January 1967	SJ7746234792; 52°54′36″N 2°20′12″W	1188037	Upload Photo
Tower at Eccleshall Castle	Eccleshall, Stafford	Tower	14th century	10 January 1953	SJ8286829582; 52°51′48″N 2°15′21″W	1374163	Upload Photo
Church of St Mary	Ellenhall, Stafford	Church	12th-century origins	15 January 1968	SJ8411226529; 52°50′10″N 2°14′14″W	1242638	Church of St Mary More images
Tower at Ranton Abbey	Ellenhall, Stafford	Church	LATE MEDIEVAL	17 March 1953	SJ8382224278; 52°48′57″N 2°14′29″W	1259926	Tower at Ranton Abbey More images
Aqualate Hall	Forton, Stafford	House	18th century	17 March 1953	SJ7735219709; 52°46′28″N 2°20′14″W	1259928	Aqualate Hall More images
Church of All Saints	Forton, Stafford	Church	12th century	15 January 1968	SJ7552121188; 52°47′16″N 2°21′52″W	1242640	Church of All Saints More images
Forton Hall	Forton, Stafford	House	1665	15 January 1968	SJ7548521162; 52°47′15″N 2°21′54″W	1242679	Forton Hall More images
Church of St Peter	Gayton, Stafford	Church	13th century	15 January 1968	SJ9784128424; 52°51′12″N 2°02′01″W	1242644	Church of St Peter More images
Church of St Giles	Haughton, Stafford	Church	14th century	15 January 1968	SJ8657020485; 52°46′54″N 2°12′02″W	1242776	Church of St Giles More images
Haughton Old Hall	Haughton, Stafford	House	Later	17 March 1953	SJ8636020649; 52°47′00″N 2°12′13″W	1242778	Upload Photo
Batchacre Hall	High Offley, Stafford	House	18th century	17 March 1953	SJ7540925436; 52°49′33″N 2°21′59″W	1242843	Batchacre Hall More images
Ingestre Hall	Ingestre, Stafford	House	Early 17th century	17 March 1953	SJ9759424695; 52°49′11″N 2°02′14″W	1242893	Ingestre Hall More images
Church of All Saints	Milwich, Stafford	Church	Perpendicular	24 January 1967	SJ9711331979; 52°53′07″N 2°02′40″W	1294230	Church of All Saints More images
Gates, Gate Standards and Side Screens Fronting North Facade of Sandon Hall	Sandon, Sandon and Burston, Stafford	Gate	Early 18th century	25 April 1980	SJ9567228747; 52°51′22″N 2°03′57″W	1039000	Upload Photo
Pitts Column	Sandon, Sandon and Burston, Stafford	Commemorative Monument	1806	10 January 1953	SJ9632128168; 52°51′04″N 2°03′22″W	1189785	Pitts Column More images
Sandon Hall	Sandon, Sandon and Burston, Stafford	Country House	1852	10 January 1953	SJ9567828696; 52°51′21″N 2°03′56″W	1189732	Sandon Hall More images
Trentham Tower	Sandon, Sandon and Burston, Stafford	Folly	c. 1840	10 January 1953	SJ9618729203; 52°51′37″N 2°03′29″W	1189768	Trentham Tower More images
Church of St Chad	Seighford, Stafford	Church	C14-C15	15 January 1968	SJ8824424994; 52°49′20″N 2°10′33″W	1258080	Church of St Chad More images
Clanford Hall	Seighford, Stafford	House	Modern	17 March 1953	SJ8717824423; 52°49′02″N 2°11′30″W	1258088	Clanford Hall More images
Church of St Michael	Stone, Stafford	Bust	1758	9 March 1949	SJ9046033814; 52°54′06″N 2°08′36″W	1196733	Church of St Michael More images
Crompton Tomb about 52m South West of Church of St Michael	Stone, Stafford	Chest Tomb	1603-26	27 July 1972	SJ9038633786; 52°54′05″N 2°08′40″W	1196734	Crompton Tomb about 52m South West of Church of St Michael
Crown Hotel	Stone, Stafford	Hotel	1778	9 March 1949	SJ9019233868; 52°54′08″N 2°08′50″W	1196742	Crown Hotel More images
Jervis Mausoleum about 5m East of Church of St Michael	Stone, Stafford	Plaque	c. 1760	27 July 1972	SJ9048833818; 52°54′06″N 2°08′34″W	1196736	Jervis Mausoleum about 5m East of Church of St Michael More images
The Priory	Stone, Stafford	House	Early to mid 18th century	9 March 1949	SJ9040133778; 52°54′05″N 2°08′39″W	1219144	The Priory
Walton House and attached Walls	Stone, Stafford	House	16th Century and later	9 March 1949	SJ9023833135; 52°53′44″N 2°08′48″W	1219285	Upload Photo
Chapel of St Marys Abbey	Oulton, Stone Rural, Stafford	Roman Catholic Chapel	1854	25 April 1980	SJ9081935616; 52°55′04″N 2°08′17″W	1038978	Upload Photo
Meaford Hall, the Manor House	Meaford, Stone Rural, Stafford	Country House	c. 1830	24 January 1967	SJ8888935618; 52°55′04″N 2°10′00″W	1374198	Upload Photo
Meaford Hall, the Nursery House	Meaford, Stone Rural, Stafford	Country House	Early 18th century	24 January 1967	SJ8890135583; 52°55′03″N 2°09′59″W	1038974	Upload Photo
Chartley Castle	Stowe-by-Chartley, Stafford	Castle	Early 13th century	15 January 1968	SK0106928501; 52°51′14″N 1°59′08″W	1258139	Chartley Castle More images
Church of St John the Baptist	Stowe-by-Chartley, Stafford	Church	13th century	15 January 1968	SK0032827362; 52°50′38″N 1°59′48″W	1273551	Church of St John the Baptist More images
Chapel of Our Lady of the Assumption	Swynnerton, Stafford	Roman Catholic Chapel	1868-9	25 April 1980	SJ8516735463; 52°54′59″N 2°13′19″W	1190309	Chapel of Our Lady of the Assumption
Church of St Mary and All Saints	Trentham Gardens, Swynnerton, Stafford	Church	1838	24 January 1967	SJ8653940907; 52°57′55″N 2°12′07″W	1190214	Church of St Mary and All Saints More images
Hatton Water Pumping Station and Chimney	Hatton, Swynnerton, Stafford	Boiler House	1907	25 April 1980	SJ8293036994; 52°55′48″N 2°15′19″W	1374201	Hatton Water Pumping Station and Chimney More images
Perseus with the Head of Medusa, Trentham Gardens	Trentham Gardens, Swynnerton, Stafford	Statue	c. 1840	25 April 1980	SJ8655140583; 52°57′45″N 2°12′06″W	1374226	Perseus with the Head of Medusa, Trentham Gardens More images
Remains of Trentham Hall, the Grand Entrance and Orangery	Trentham Gardens, Swynnerton, Stafford	Country House	1833-42	24 January 1967	SJ8649740883; 52°57′54″N 2°12′09″W	1190243	Remains of Trentham Hall, the Grand Entrance and Orangery More images
Sutherland Monument	Trentham, Swynnerton, Stafford	Column	1836	10 January 1953	SJ8689038846; 52°56′49″N 2°11′48″W	1038951	Sutherland Monument More images
St Andrew's Church	Weston, Stafford	Parish Church	Early 13th century	15 January 1968	SJ9743127112; 52°50′29″N 2°02′22″W	1273479	St Andrew's Church More images
Weston Hall	Weston, Stafford	House	17th century	17 March 1953	SJ9662827008; 52°50′26″N 2°03′05″W	1258043	Weston Hall More images
Church of Holy Trinity	Baswich, Stafford	Church	13th century	16 January 1951	SJ9438822297; 52°47′54″N 2°05′05″W	1195367	Church of Holy Trinity More images
Church of St Chad	Stafford	Tower	14th century	16 January 1951	SJ9225523185; 52°48′22″N 2°06′59″W	1212227	Church of St Chad More images
Church of St Mary	Castle Church, Stafford	Church	15th century	16 January 1951	SJ9058922156; 52°47′49″N 2°08′28″W	1195376	Church of St Mary More images
45 and 46, Greengate Street	Stafford	House	18th century	16 January 1951	SJ9219923186; 52°48′22″N 2°07′02″W	1298172	45 and 46, Greengate Street
County Buildings and Judges House	Stafford	Office	1879	17 December 1971	SJ9226723264; 52°48′25″N 2°06′58″W	1298178	County Buildings and Judges House More images
Eastgate House (Registrar's Office, part)	Stafford	House	Early 18th century	16 January 1951	SJ9232623271; 52°48′25″N 2°06′55″W	1298148	Eastgate House (Registrar's Office, part) More images
Friends' Meeting House	Stafford	Friends Meeting House	1730	16 January 1951	SJ9202223722; 52°48′40″N 2°07′11″W	1211911	Friends' Meeting House More images
High House	Stafford	House	1976-86	16 January 1951	SJ9219423198; 52°48′23″N 2°07′02″W	1212192	High House More images
Noell's Almshouses and Attached Boundary Wall	Stafford	Almshouse	c. 1660	16 January 1951	SJ9206623063; 52°48′18″N 2°07′09″W	1212519	Noell's Almshouses and Attached Boundary Wall More images
Post Office and attached Railings and Gate	Stafford	House	c. 1700	29 July 1970	SJ9223423079; 52°48′19″N 2°07′00″W	1195351	Post Office and attached Railings and Gate More images
Shire Hall and attached Railings, Gates and Lamp Standards	Stafford	Gate	1795-8	16 January 1951	SJ9223123306; 52°48′26″N 2°07′00″W	1298177	Shire Hall and attached Railings, Gates and Lamp Standards More images
Staffordshire County Staff Club	Stafford	House	Mid 18th century	16 January 1951	SJ9235023244; 52°48′24″N 2°06′54″W	1211304	Staffordshire County Staff Club More images
Swan Hotel	Stafford	Courtyard	Pre 1733	16 January 1951	SJ9220423172; 52°48′22″N 2°07′02″W	1195355	Swan Hotel More images
Upmeads and attached Terrace Walls	Stafford	House	1908	17 December 1971	SJ9096522344; 52°47′55″N 2°08′08″W	1195363	Upload Photo
William Salt Library	Stafford	House	18th century	16 January 1951	SJ9241423243; 52°48′24″N 2°06′50″W	1298149	William Salt Library More images
