= Old Borough Library, Stafford =

Library building in Stafford, Staffordshire, England

Old Borough Library
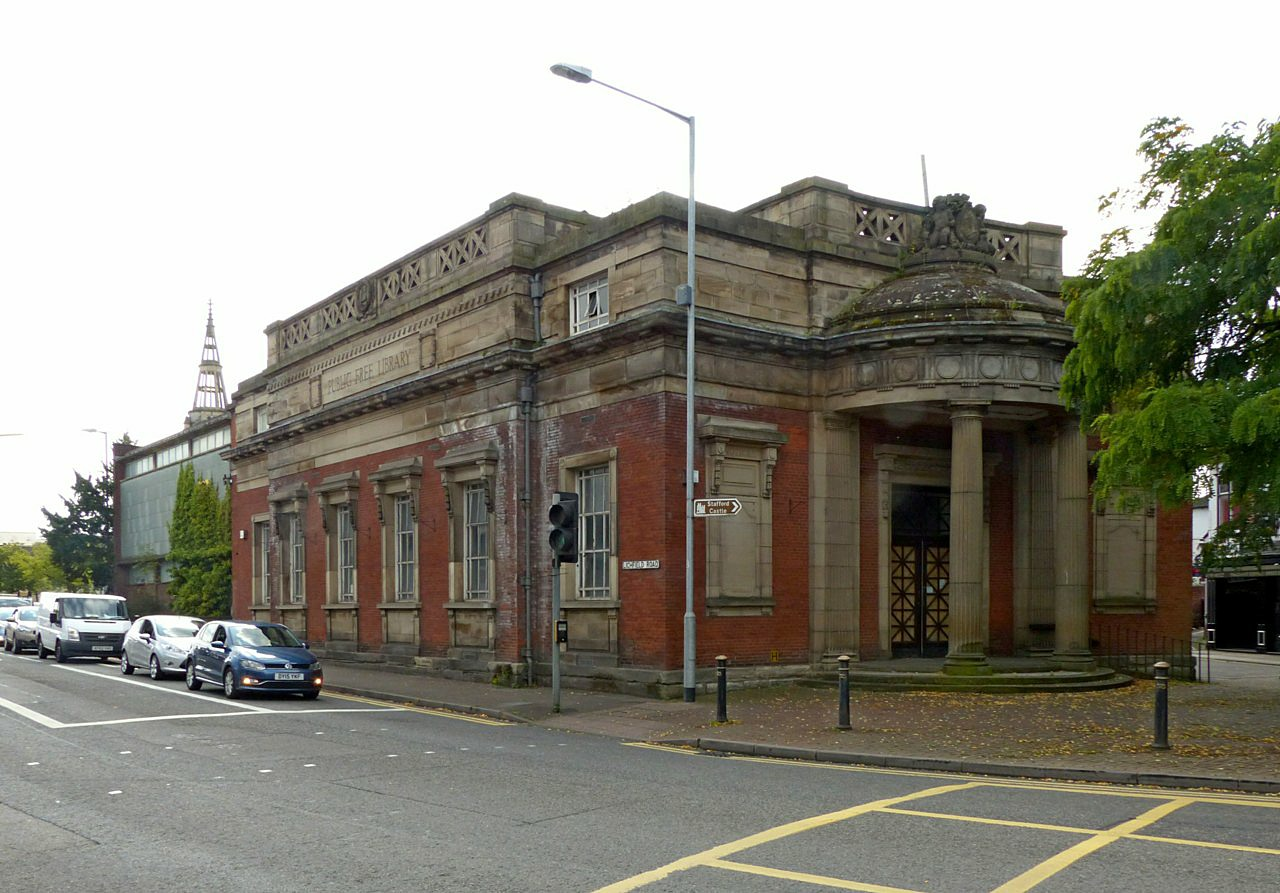
- Interactive map of the Old Borough Library area

General information
- Status: Grade II listed
- Location: Stafford, Staffordshire, United Kingdom
- Coordinates: 52°48′13.144″N 2°6′54.126″W grid reference SJ 92332 22917
- Opened: 1914

Design and construction
- Architects: Briggs, Wolstenholme and Thornely

The Old Borough Library is a former public library in Stafford, Staffordshire, England, opened in 1914. It is a Grade II listed building.

== History and description ==
The building, partly funded by the charity of Andrew Carnegie, was designed by the Liverpool architects Briggs, Wolstenholme and Thornely in 1912. Arnold Thornely was the architect of many public buildings in Liverpool, and also the Parliament Buildings in Stormont.

The Mayor of Stafford, C. W. Miller, laid the foundation stone on 19 February 1913, and the library opened in 1914. There was a lending and reference library, and a reading room. It also housed the zoological and geological collection of Clement Lindley Wragge, transferred from Borough Hall in Stafford, which had since 1882 been the location of the lending and reference library.

The building is on an island site known as The Green; it is at the junction of Newport Road, Bridge Street, Lichfield Road and Bailey Street, south of the town centre. The original building is V-shaped, with the main entrance, a semi-circular porch with two Tuscan columns and a semi-domed roof, at the flattened point at the north-west.

An art gallery was opened in 1934. The building was extended by the borough architect in 1962.

=== Closure ===
The library closed in 1998, and was used as the Stafford Performing Arts Centre. The building was sold in 2011. It was given Grade II listed status (excluding the 1962 extension) in 2015. The Victorian Society in 2016 placed it in their list of top ten endangered buildings. The Friends of the Carnegie Old Library Stafford launched a campaign to re-open the building as a community venue. In 2019, however, a proposal submitted to Stafford Borough Council, to convert it into ten apartments and a bar and restaurant, was approved.

== See also ==
- Listed buildings in Stafford (Outer Area)
