= Stafford Combined Court Centre =

Judicial building in Stafford, England

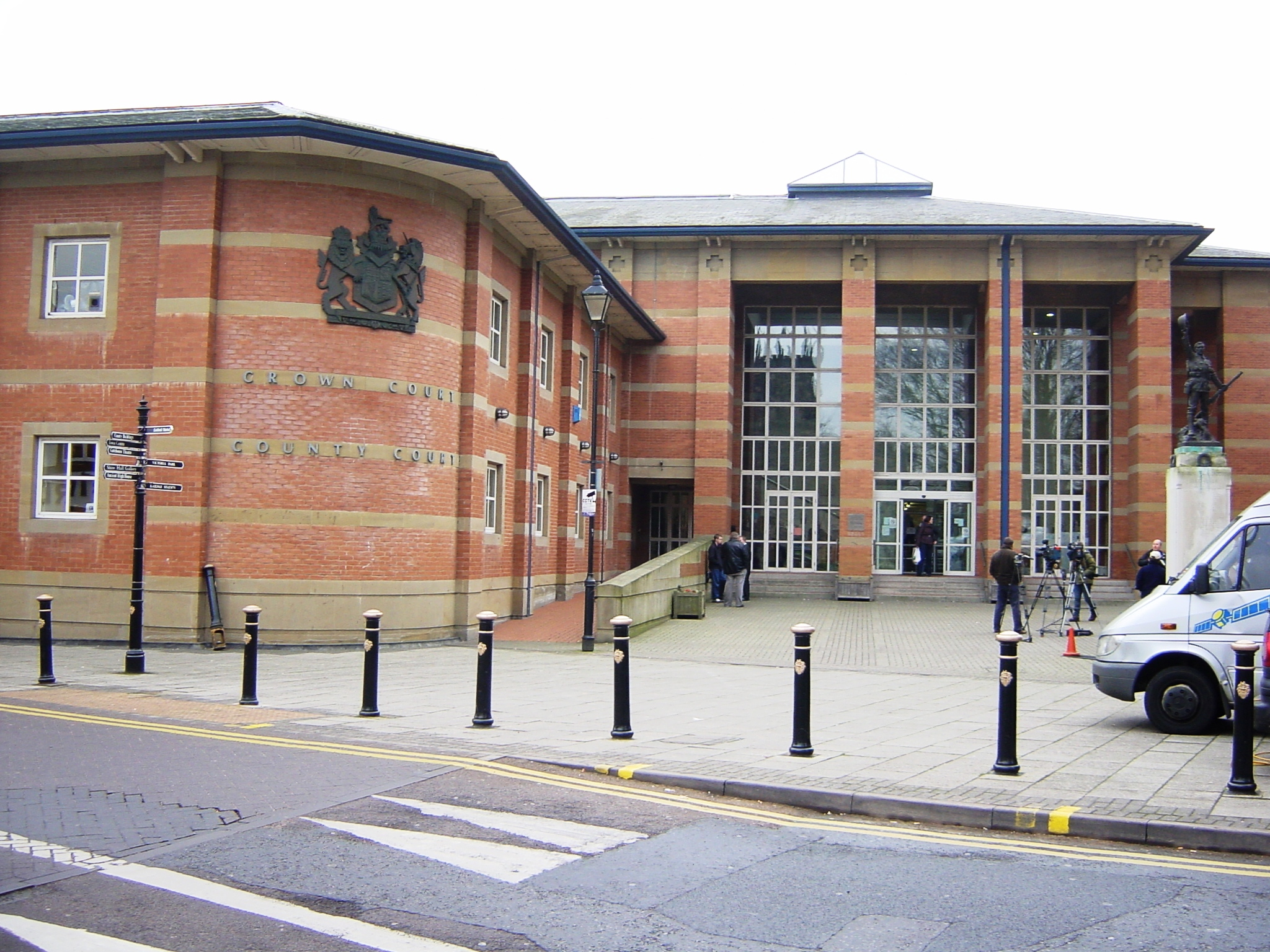
- Stafford Combined Court Centre

- Shown in Staffordshire
- 52.8053°N 2.1201°W
- Location: Victoria Square, Stafford

History
- Built: 1991

Site notes
- Architect: Associated Architects
- Architectural style: Modernist style

The Stafford Combined Court Centre is a Crown Court venue, which deals with criminal cases, as well as a County Court venue, which deals with civil cases, in Victoria Square, Stafford, England.

== History ==
Until the early 1990s, criminal court hearings were held in the old Shire Hall. However, as the number of court cases in Stafford grew, it became necessary to commission a more modern courthouse for both Crown Court hearings and County Court hearings. The site selected by the Lord Chancellor's Department, on the east side of Victoria Square, had been occupied by an old cattle market.

The new building was intended to complement the style of the former County Education Offices, now part of Stafford College, on the opposite side of Victoria Square. It also needed to retain enough space for the Stafford Borough War Memorial, which had been designed by Joseph Whitehead in the form of a bronze figure of a soldier on a Portland stone pedestal, and which had stood in Victoria Square since 1920.

The centre was designed by Associated Architects of Birmingham in the Modernist style, built in red brick with stone dressings at a cost of £10.4 million, and was completed in 1991. The design involved a two-storey section on the left which stretched along Earl Street and a three-storey entrance block on the right which was well set back from the road. The section on the left featured three full-height curved windows, all facing southeast and each slightly recessed from the other as the section stretched along Earl Street; there was a Royal coat of arms mounted on the brickwork on the northwest facing wall as the section curved round towards the entrance block. The entrance block on the right featured three full-height glazed openings separated by brick piers which supported an entablature and modillioned eaves. Internally, the building was laid out to accommodate seven courtrooms.

Notable cases have included the trial and conviction of Simon Smith, in July 1996, for the murder of his three children at their homes in Stone and in Stafford, and the trial and conviction of Horrett Campbell, in December 1996, for the attempted murder of three children and four women with a machete at an infant school at Blakenhall, Wolverhampton,
