= Listed buildings in Stafford (central area) =

Stafford is a town in the Borough of Stafford, Staffordshire, England. The unparished area contains 141 buildings that are recorded in the National Heritage List for England as designated listed buildings. Of these, one is listed at Grade I, the highest grade, 15 are listed at Grade II*, the middle of the three grades, and the others are at Grade II, the lowest grade. This list contains the listed buildings in the central area of the town; those in the town but outside this area are in Listed buildings in Stafford (Outer Area).

Most of the listed buildings in this area are houses and associated structures, shops and offices, hotels and public houses, and churches with items in the churchyards. The earliest buildings, other than the churches, are timber framed, or have timber framed cores. The other listed buildings include the foundations of an ancient chapel, a surviving portion of the medieval town walls, commercial buildings, civic buildings, schools and colleges, a shelter, a former cinema, war memorials, and telephone kiosks.

== Key ==
Grade	Criteria
I	Buildings of exceptional interest, sometimes considered to be internationally important
II*	Particularly important buildings of more than special interest
II	Buildings of national importance and special interest

== Buildings ==
Name and location	Photograph	Date	Notes	Grade
Foundations of St Bertelin's Chapel; 52.80615°N 2.11863°W		11th century	The foundations of a shrine chapel that were excavated in 1954. The ground plan is laid out in stone, and show a nave and a narrower chancel. In the centre is a replica of a cross found during the excavation.	II
St Chad's Church; 52.80616°N 2.11637°W		12th century	Alterations and additions were made to the church during the centuries, including the tower, which was rebuilt in about 1500. The church was restored during the 19th century when further alterations were made, including work by George Gilbert Scott in the 1870s. The church is built in stone, the roof of the south aisle is slated, and the other roofs are tiled. The tower is in Perpendicular style, and the rest of the church is Norman. It has a cruciform plan, consisting of a nave with a clerestory, north and south aisles, a north transept, a south vestry, a chancel, and a tower at the crossing. The tower has angle buttresses, a traceried frieze, a cornice with gargoyles, and an embattled parapet. At the west end is a Norman doorway, over which is a five-arched arcade and a niche containing a statue of St Chad.	II*
St Mary's Church; 52.80633°N 2.11818°W		Early 13th century	A collegiate church that was altered and extended in the following centuries, and restored and partly rebuilt in 1841–44 by George Gilbert Scott. It is built in stone with tile roofs, and consists of a nave with a clerestory, north and south aisles, north and south transepts, a chancel, and a tower at the crossing. The tower has an octagonal top stage with a frieze, a cornice with gargoyles, and a panelled parapet with crocketed pinnacles.	I
East Gate; 52.80642°N 2.11143°W		Early 15th century (probable)	Part of the east gate, this portion of wall is the only surviving part of the medieval town walls, and was later rebuilt against the wall of a cottage, most of which has been demolished. It is about 5 metres (16 ft) tall and about 3 metres (9.8 ft) long, and part of the cottage wall remains to the rear. The remains are also a scheduled monument.	II
10 Church Lane and 35 Mill Street; 52.80539°N 2.11816°W		15th century	Alterations and additions were made in the 18th and 19th centuries. No. 10 Church Lane is timber framed and has a tile roof, two storeys and two bays. The upper storey is jettied with five arched braces, in the ground floor are plate glass windows, and the upper floor contains casement windows. No. 35 Mill Street is on a corner side and has two storeys, the ground floor is in brick and the jettied upper floor is timber framed. In the ground floor are shop windows, the upper floor in Church Lane has casement windows, and in Mill Street the windows are sashes. To the right is a cart entrance containing the remains of a full cruck truss.	II
18 Market Square; 52.80742°N 2.11781°W		15th century	A house, later incorporated into a shopping centre, it was refronted in about 1700 and altered in the 20th century. It has a timber framed core, the front is stuccoed, it has a modillioned cornice, and the roof is slated. There are three storeys and an attic, and an L-shaped plan, with a symmetrical front of five bays. In the ground floor is a modern shop front, the upper floors contain sash windows, the windows in the middle bay are blind, and there are two pedimented dormers. Inside, there is exposed timber framing.	II
56 Greengate Street; 52.80672°N 2.11743°W		Late 15th to early 16th century	A house, later a shop, that was remodelled in about 1930, retaining some of the original timber framing. It now has applied timber framing on the exterior with plaster infill and a tile roof. There are three storeys, each upper storey jettied, and two gabled bays. In the ground floor is a modern shop front, and the windows are three-light casements.	II
Former Noah's Ark Inn; 52.80716°N 2.11899°W		Early 16th century (possible)	The former public house was refronted in the 19th century, and is in Tudor style. It is in stone with cornices over both floors, a coped parapet, and a slate roof with tile cresting. There are two storeys and an attic, and an L-shaped plan with a front of four bays and a rounded angle on the right. On the front is a two-storey canted bay window, above which is a gabled dormer. The windows are mullioned and transomed, and the doorway has a mullioned fanlight.	II
High House, Greengate Street; 52.80629°N 2.11710°W		1555	A house, later used for other purposes, it is timber framed on a stone plinth, and has a tile roof. There are three storeys and an attic, each storey jettied on console brackets, a front of five bays, and two rear gabled wings with a gabled stair wing between. In the ground floor are two shop fronts, and above are moulded mullioned and transomed windows. In the centre of the first floor is an oriel bow window over which is a balustrade with square balusters, and the attic has four gables. On the right return are two canted oriel windows.	II*
45 and 46 Greengate Street; 52.80618°N 2.11710°W		Late 16th century	A house, later a pair of shops with hotel accommodation above, it is timber framed and stuccoed, and has a double-span tile roof. There are three storeys and an attic, the top floor and the attic jettied, and a right-angled plan, with a front of two bays, and two rear gabled wings. At the top are two gables with decorative bargeboards and pendants. In the ground floor are modern shop fronts, and the upper floors contain sash windows, with a canted oriel window in the right bay of the first floor.	II*
7–10 Bridge Street; 52.80417°N 2.11577°W		Mid 17th century	A row of four shops that were altered in about 1820. They are in Georgian style, and built in brick with stuccoed dressings, wide eaves, and a slate roof. No. 10 has end pilasters with stucco capitals. There are three storeys, six bays, and wings and extensions at the rear. In the ground floor are modern shop fronts, most of the windows in the upper floors are sashes, and in the middle floor they have wedge lintels.	II
36 and 37 Gaolgate Street; 52.80796°N 2.11781°W		17th century	A house on a corner site, altered in the 18th century, and later shops, it has a timber framed core, the exterior is in stuccoed brick, with quoins, floor bands, a modillioned cornice, and a tile roof. The building is in Georgian style, and has three storeys, five bays on the front and two on the right return, and two gabled rear wings. In the ground floor are modern shop fronts, and the upper floors contain sash windows.	II
Primrose Cottage, 10 Mill Street; 52.80517°N 2.11779°W		17th century (probable)	A house, later a shop, it was extensively altered in the 19th century and extended to the rear in the 20th century. It is in stuccoed brick and has a thatched roof. There is one storey and an attic, in the ground floor is a shop front, and above is a gabled dormer with plain bargeboards and the date 1610.	II
The Bear Public House, 7 Greengate Street; 52.80641°N 2.11688°W		17th century	The public house was refronted and a rear wing added in about 1870. It is timber framed with brick at the rear and has a tile roof. There are two storeys and attics, the attics gabled and jettied, a front of two bays, and a rear wing. In the ground floor are two entrances and two canted oriel windows, in the upper floor are two rectangular oriel windows each with four round-headed lights, and in the attic are projecting windows on brackets with two-round-headed lights and cornices. The rear wing is gabled with two storeys, and one storey at the end.	II
The Colonnade and Tudor House, 9 Eastgate Street; 52.80710°N 2.11507°W		17th century (probable)	A house, later shops, it was altered in the 19th century. The building is partly timber framed and partly in brick, and has a tile roof. There are two storeys and an attic, three bays, and a gabled rear wing. In the ground floor are two shop fronts, the left with a bay window, and with a fascia above them. The left bay contains a two-storey gabled porch, the upper floor is jettied, there is an entry in the ground floor, and small-paned casement windows on three sides above in the upper floor. The other bays are gabled, and contain projecting casement windows in the upper floor.	II
Noell's Almshouses and wall 52.80507°N 2.11913°W		c. 1660	The almshouses and chapel are in stone with rendered rear wings and tile roofs, and are in Jacobean style. They form an U-shaped plan with the chapel in the centre, and have one storey and attics. The main range has six bays, and the central chapel projects under a shaped gable flanked by short embattled parapets. The chapel has a pointed doorway above which is a pedimented plaque containing a coat of arms and flanked by Doric columns. The outer bays and the three-bay side wings are gabled and contain gabled porches, mullioned windows, and dormers. The rear garden is enclosed by a boundary wall on two sides.	II*
7 St Mary's Grove; 52.80667°N 2.11831°W		c. 1680	The building has a timber framed core, its exterior dates from the mid-18th century and is in Georgian style. It is in brick with floor bands, a top frieze and cornice. and a double-span tile roof with coped gables. There are two storeys and an attic, and a symmetrical front of five bays. The central round-headed doorway has fluted pilasters, a fanlight and an open pediment. The windows are sashes with segmental heads and brick keystones and there are two gabled dormers. Inside, there are timber framed cross-walls.	II
8 St Mary's Grove; 52.80669°N 2.11817°W		c. 1680	The building has a timber framed core, its exterior dates from the mid-18th century and is in Georgian style. It is in brick with a floor band, a top frieze and cornice. and a double-span tile roof with coped gables. There are two storeys and an attic, and a symmetrical front of five bays. The ground floor projects and has a cornice and blocking course. The round-headed doorway has a fanlight and a keystone. The windows are sashes, in the ground floor they are tripartite, in the upper floor they have segmental heads and brick keystones, and there are two gabled dormers. Inside, there are timber framed cross-walls.	II
Eastgate House; 52.80691°N 2.11524°W		1683	A house, later used for other purposes, it is in Georgian style, and was refronted in the 18th century and extended in the 19th century. The house is in brick with stone dressings on a plaster plinth, with quoins, a band, a modillion cornice, and a half-hipped tile roof. There are two storeys and an attic, a double-depth plan, a front of seven bays, and rear gabled wings. Steps lead up to the central doorway that has a Tuscan surround. The windows are sashes with keystones, and there are three pedimented dormers.	II*
Former Post Office, railings and gate, Greengate Street; 52.80522°N 2.11663°W		c. 1700	A house, later used for other purposes, it is in brick with stone dressings on a stone plinth, with a cornice above the ground floor, an entablature at the top, and a hipped tile roof. There are two storeys and an H-shaped plan, with a main range of five bays and flanking projecting gabled wings with Corinthian angle pilasters. The central entrance has an architrave, a pulvinated frieze, and a broken segmental pediment containing a cartouche. The windows are sashes with keystones, those in the ground floor fluted. The windows in the wings have architraves. The forecourt is enclosed by dwarf walls that have iron railings and gates with finials and scrolled wrought iron panels.	II*
2 and 3 Church Lane; 52.80577°N 2.11835°W		17th or early 18th century	A house, later a restaurant, it was refronted in the 19th century. The building is in painted brick with a modillioned cornice and a tile roof. There are three storeys and four bays. The doorways have segmental heads, the windows are casements, and there are canted oriel windows with hipped roofs.	II
21 and 22 Greengate Street; 52.80548°N 2.11634°W		Early 18th century	A house, later a shop, with a 19th-century front reconstructed in the 20th century. It is in brick, with a modillioned cornice, and a coped tile roof. There are three storeys, two bays, and two gabled rear wings. In the ground floor is a 20th-century shop front with two recessed small-paned bow windows and a top entablature. The upper floors contain tripartite sash windows with pilasters and entablatures, the left window in the middle floor being a canted oriel window.	II
William Salt Library, Eastgate Street; 52.80666°N 2.11381°W		1730–35	A house, later a library, with an 18th-century cottage to the left. It is in brick on a plinth, with sill bands, a coved cornice, and a tile roof with coped gables, and is in early Georgian style. The library has two storeys and an attic and six bays. Steps lead up to the doorway that has fluted pilasters, a fanlight, entablature blocks, and an open pediment. The windows are sashes and there are two gabled dormers. Inside are timber framed cross-walls. The cottage has two storeys, two bays, a round-headed doorway and a large window to the right, both with triple keystones.	II*
19 Greengate Street; 52.80567°N 2.11638°W		Early to mid 18th century	A house, later a shop and an office, it is in early Georgian style, and was altered and extended in the 20th century. It is in brick with stone dressings, quoins, a top frieze, a cornice, and a stone-coped parapet. There are three storeys, a symmetrical front of five bays, and a 20th-century rear wing. In the ground floor is a shop front with Tuscan columns, a frieze and a cornice. The windows are sashes with keystones and aprons, the windows in the middle bay have architraves, and the window in the middle floor also has a segmental head.	II
23, 23A, 23B and 23C Greengate Street; 52.80537°N 2.11628°W		Early to mid 18th century	These are shops and offices in brick with stone dressings, there is a modillioned cornice over the ground floor, quoins in the upper floor, a top frieze and a dentilled cornice, and a tile roof. There are two storeys and an attic, a front of four bays, and a gabled wing and a lean-to outshut at the rear. In the ground floor is a round-headed doorway with fluted pilasters, a fanlight with radial glazing bars, and an open pediment. Flanking the doorway are modern shop fronts, in the upper floor are sash windows in moulded surrounds, and there are four pedimented dormers.	II
37 and 38 Greengate Street; 52.80544°N 2.11663°W		Early to mid 18th century	A pair of stuccoed shops with a top cornice and a coped tile roof. There are two storeys and an attic, and five bays. In the ground floor of No. 37 is a doorway and to the left is a bow window with panelled pilasters, a frieze, and a cornice, and No. 38 contains a shop front. In the upper floor are sash windows and one blind window, and there are three gabled dormers. Inside, there are timber framed cross walls.	II
15 Tipping Street; 52.80610°N 2.11472°W		c. 1740	A house, later an office, in Georgian style, it is in brick with vitrified headers and stone dressings, and has a cornice over the ground floor, a top cornice, and a tile roof. There are two storeys and an attic, a double depth plan, four bays, and a gabled rear wing. On the front is a porch with Doric columns, a Tuscan entablature, and a doorway with a fanlight. The windows are sashes in moulded frames, with keystones, fluted in the ground floor and panelled in the upper floor, and there are four gabled dormers with casements. Inside, there are timber framed cross walls.	II
6 St Mary's Grove; 52.80658°N 2.11849°W		c. 1750	A house, later an office, it is in roughcast brick with plaster and stone dressings, on a plinth, with a floor band, a top cornice, and a tile roof. There are two storeys and an attic, and two bays. The round-headed doorway has panelled pilasters, imposts, a fanlight with radial glazing bars, and a fluted keystone. The windows are sashes, and there are two flat-roofed dormers. Inside, there are timber framed cross-walls.	II
5 Eastgate Street; 52.80734°N 2.11543°W		Mid 18th century	A house, later a shop, that was altered in the 20th century. It is in red brick with a tile roof, and has two storeys and an attic, and three bays. In the ground floor is a modern shop front, the upper floor contains sash windows with painted lintels, and there are two two-light hipped dormers.	II
34 Gaolgate Street; 52.80810°N 2.11788°W	—	Mid 18th century	A house, later a shop, incorporating earlier material, it is in stuccoed brick with some remaining timber framing, and has a tile roof with a coped left gable. There are three storeys, an L-shaped plan, and four bays. In the ground floor is a 20th-century shop front, and the upper floors contain sash windows.	II
35 AND 35A Gaolgate Street; 52.80805°N 2.11785°W		Mid 18th century	A house, later shops, it is in stuccoed brick with quoins, a top cornice, and a tile roof. There are two storeys, an L-shaped plan, and four bays. In the ground floor the two right bays have a modern shop front, and to the left is an older shop front with a fascia and a cornice. The upper floor contains sash windows with architraves and cornices.	II
39, 39A and 40 Greengate Street; 52.80555°N 2.11669°W		Mid 18th century	A pair of houses, later a shop and offices, altered in the 19th century, and in early Georgian style. The building is in brick with stone dressings, a floor band, quoins, a top cornice, and a tile roof with coped gables. There are two storeys and an attic, a front of nine bays, and a gabled wing and a range at the rear. In the ground floor are shop fronts, and to the right is a round-headed doorway with an archivolt, pilaster strips, a fanlight, a frieze, and a pediment. In the upper floor are sash windows with moulded surrounds, two of which have architraves with keystones, and there are four pedimented dormers.	II
Railings south of former Post Office; 52.80507°N 2.11658°W		18th century	The railings are on a stone plinth. They are in wrought iron with decorative finials and scrolled panels. The railings contain brick gate piers with stone caps and a pair of gates.	II
Staffordshire County Staff Club, Eastgate Street; 52.80676°N 2.11492°W		Mid 18th century	A house, later used for other purposes, it is in brick with plastered dressings, on a plinth, with a band and a tile roof, and is in Georgian style. There are two storeys and an attic, six bays, and two rear gabled wings. The round-headed doorway has fluted pilasters, a fanlight, entablature blocks, and an open pediment. The windows are sashes, and there are three gabled dormers.	II*
The Vine Hotel, 4 and 5 Salter Street; 52.80805°N 2.11689°W		18th century	The hotel is in stuccoed brick with a tile roof. The main part has six bays, the first and fifth bays are gabled with three storeys, and the rest have two storeys. To the left is a projecting two-storey three-bay wing. In the ground floor of the main part the first bay contains a carriage entry, and elsewhere are three canted bay windows, a bow window, and a central entrance. The middle floor contains an oriel window in the third bay, and the other windows in the upper floors are sashes. The wing has a modillioned cornice, in the ground floor is a shop front and a carriage entry to the left, and the upper floor contains top-hung casement windows.	II
5 St Mary's Grove; 52.80657°N 2.11858°W	—	c. 1760	A house, later an office, in brick, with storey bands, a modillioned cornice, and a tile roof. There are three storeys and two bays. The central doorway and the windows in the lower two floors, which are all casements, have cambered arches.	II
20 Greengate Street; 52.80557°N 2.11639°W	—	Mid to late 18th century	A stuccoed shop with a top cornice and a tile roof. There are two storeys and an attic, a symmetrical front of five bays, and two gabled rear wings. In the ground floor is a shop front, the upper floor contains sash windows, and in the attic are two flat-roofed dormers.	II
Swan Hotel, Greengate Street; 52.80608°N 2.11702°W		Mid to late 18th century	The hotel, which incorporates earlier material, is stuccoed, and has a modillioned cornice a parapet, and a slate Mansard roof. There are three storeys and an attic, a front of six bays, and two gabled wings at the rear, with the courtyard partly roofed. The doorway has a segmental head, and on the front are three bow windows, the one to the left with two storeys, and the others with one storey. The other windows are sashes, and there are five flat-roofed dormers.	II*
76 Eastgate Street; 52.80669°N 2.11474°W		c. 1770	A house, later used for other purposes, it is in Georgian style. The building is in brick on a plaster plinth, with a floor band, a top cornice, and a tile roof. There are two storeys, a double depth plan, a front of four bays, and two gabled wings at the rear. The round-headed doorway has fluted pilasters, a fanlight with radial glazing bars, entablature blocks, and an open pediment, there is a further doorway to the left, and the windows are sashes.	II
Shrewsbury Arms Public House, 25 Eastgate Street; 52.80662°N 2.11454°W		Late 18th century	The public house is on a corner site, and is in painted brick with stone dressings, a modillioned cornice, and a tile roof. It is in Georgian style, and has three storeys, four bays on Eastgate Street, three on Tipping Street, and two gabled wings and an outshut at the rear. In the ground floor is a 19th-century shop front, with the doorway canted on the corner. Between the windows are panelled pilaster strips with finials, modillioned cornices with rosettes, and panelled aprons. To the right are two further doorways that have pilasters and entablatures. At the right end is a bow window, the other windows are sashes with wedge lintels, and on Tipping Street is a carriage entrance.	II
28 Eastgate Street; 52.80659°N 2.11332°W		c. 1780	A house, later an office, in Georgian style, it is pebbledashed and has a top cornice and a tile roof. There are three storeys, a double depth plan, a symmetrical front of three bays, and a rear wing. Steps lead up to a round-headed doorway with Doric half-columns on plinths, a Tuscan entablature with fluted panels and paterae, and a pediment, and there is a fanlight with radial glazing bars. The doorway is flanked by two-storey bow windows, and the other windows are sashes, the window above the doorway with a bracketed entablature.	II
Lloyds Bank, 5 Market Square; 52.80750°N 2.11697°W		c. 1795	The bank, which was altered in about 1860, is in Classical style and built in stone. There are three storeys, a double depth plan, and a front of five bays, the right three bays projecting with a rusticated ground floor. The bank has a first floor sill band, quoins, and a deep modillioned cornice. In the ground floor are windows and an entrance, all with round heads, and those in the right three bays with rusticated voussoirs and panel aprons. The upper floors contain sash windows with architraves.	II
Shire Hall, railings, gates and lamp standards 52.80721°N 2.11685°W		1795–99	A county court house that was extended in 1854, it is in Neoclassical style. The building is in stone with a hipped slate roof, and it has a double-depth plan. There are two storeys and a front of nine bays, the middle three bays projecting and containing a tetrastyle Doric portico with an Ionic entablature, and three round arches in the ground floor. The ground floor is rusticated, and there is a sill band, a top frieze, a cornice, and a blocking course. The windows are sashes, and above them are alternate round and square panels. In front of the hall are cast iron railings, lamp standards and gates.	II*
29 Eastgate Street; 52.80658°N 2.11322°W		c. 1800	A house, later an office, it is in plastered brick, and has a tile roof. There are three storeys, a double depth plan, and one bay. The doorway has a fanlight, a cornice on consoles, and a blocking course, and the windows are sashes.	II
6 and 7 Market Square; 52.80698°N 2.11697°W		c. 1800	A shop and office in brick with a top cornice and a slate roof, in Georgian style. There are three storeys, two bays, a narrow two-storey lean-to bay on the left, and two gabled rear wings. The main doorway has an architrave, a fanlight with decorative glazing and a panel above, and is flanked by bow windows with pilasters, a frieze and an entablature, above all of which is a cornice. The upper floors contain tripartite sash windows with pilasters and entablatures. In the left bay is a similar doorway and above is a sash window.	II
County Buildings and Judge's House; 52.80682°N 2.11627°W		c. 1800	The older part is the Judge's House, which is in Neoclassical style, in stone with a parapeted roof. There are three storeys and six bays, with a rusticated ground floor, containing a loggia of six arches, with sash windows above. The county buildings date from 1893 to 1895, and are in Baroque style with Arts and crafts influences. They have two storeys and an attic, the ground floor is in stone, and the upper floor is in brick with stone dressings. In the centre are eight bays that are flanked by projecting wings with copper-clad cupolas.	II*
The Market Vaults, St Martin's Place; 52.80691°N 2.11673°W		c. 1800	The public house was extended to the left in the mid-19th century. The original part is in Georgian style, and built in brick, the ground floor and right return are plastered, it has a fascia over the ground floor, and a top cornice. There are three storeys, and an angled front of two bays. The doorway has pilasters, a fanlight, and an entablature, and the windows are sashes, those in the ground floor with fluted pilasters, entablatures, and aprons. The extension is stuccoed, and has three storeys and an attic, and one bay, a rusticated ground floor, and a top cornice. In the ground floor are three doorways, the one to the right with fluted pilasters, entablature blocks, a fanlight, and an open pediment. The windows are sashes in architraves, and there is a large dormer.	II
2 Mount Street; 52.80778°N 2.11988°W		c. 1810	A house, later an office, it is in Georgian style, and has an earlier rear wing. It is in brick with stuccoed dressings and a tile roof. There are three storeys, four bays, and a rear wing. The left three bays are symmetrical, and in the centre is a doorway with fluted pilasters, a fanlight, entablature blocks, and an open dentilled pediment. The windows are sashes with wedge lintels. In the right bay is a plain doorway, and at the top is a blocked round-headed arch. The rear wing is gabled, it is plastered with a modillioned cornice, and contains a mullioned window.	II
8 Market Square; 52.80694°N 2.11720°W		c. 1810	The bank, which has three storeys, polished granite facing on the ground floor, and tile roofs, was extended in the 1890s. The original part is in stone, and has three bays, with a cornice above the ground floor, a sill band above, and wide eaves, and it contains sash windows. The extension to the right is on a corner site, in brick with stone dressings, and is in French Renaissance style. There are three bays on each front, and a curved bay on the corner, with two cornices and Dutch gables with flanking finials. In the middle floor are brick piers with festoon capitals, between which are transomed windows with elliptical tympani, banded voussoirs, and cartouches with carvings. The top floor windows have cornices.	II
Moat House, 133 Newport Road; 52.80387°N 2.11821°W		c. 1810	A house, later an office, it is in Regency style. It is in rendered brick, with the ground floor rusticated and a cornice above, a top frieze and wide eaves, and a hipped slate roof. There are two storeys, a symmetrical three-bay front, and a rear service wing. In the centre is a tetrastyle porch with fluted baseless Doric columns, and a Tuscan entablature, and the doorway has a fanlight. The windows in the ground floor are small-paned casements, and in the upper floor they are sashes.	II
St Bernard's House, 23 Broad Street; 52.80765°N 2.11996°W		c. 1810	A house, later an office, it is in Georgian style. It is in rendered brick with stuccoed dressings, bands, end pilasters, and a tile roof. There are three storeys, a double depth plan, two bays, and a gabled rear wing. The round-headed doorway has pilasters, a fanlight with radial glazing bars, entablature blocks, and an open pediment. The windows are sashes and have stucco surrounds giving the effect of quoins.	II
57 Greengate Street; 52.80681°N 2.11746°W		c. 1820	A shop and office in brick with stone dressings, a sill course, a top cornice, and a stone-coped brick parapet. There are three storeys, two bays, and a gabled rear wing. In the ground floor is a modern shop front with a doorway to the right, in the middle floor are oriel windows with rounded ends, sashes, panelled aprons, panelled pilaster strips, friezes, and cornices, and the top floor contains segmental-headed tripartite sash windows.	II
58 Greengate Street; 52.80688°N 2.11752°W	—	c. 1820	A brick shop with wide eaves and a shallow gabled roof. There are three storeys, two bays, and a rear wing. In the ground floor is a 20th-century shop front with a fascia, and plate glass windows with slender colonettes. The middle floor contains oriel windows with casements, and in the top floor are sash windows.	II
Dale Monument; 52.80592°N 2.11919°W	—	1825	The monument is in the churchyard of St Mary's Church, and is to the memory of members of the Dale family. It is in stone, and takes the form of an oval plinth, with pilasters, a frieze and a cornice. The cap has an urn with a tall finial.	II
6 Greengate Street; 52.80651°N 2.11695°W	—	Early 19th century	A shop with a rear wing added in the 20th century, it is stuccoed and has a sill course and a parapet. There are three storeys, and four bays. In the ground floor is a shop front, the upper floors contain sash windows with architraves, those in the middle floor also with pulvinated friezes and cornices.	II
Fry headstone 52.80601°N 2.11944°W	—	c. 1827	The headstone in the churchyard of St Mary's Church, and commemorates Bernard Fry, a surgeon. It is in stone with a shaped top, and carries an inscription relating to Fry's work during an outbreak of typhus, from which he died.	II
Church Lane Evangelical Church; 52.80567°N 2.11850°W		1839	Built originally for the Plymouth Brethren, and later a free church, it is in brick with stone dressings and a tile roof. It has a rectangular plan, and is in Classical style. The east front has three bays, and contains two tiers of cross-casement windows with gabled lintels. The north end has a pedimented gable, and a gabled porch above which is a tripartite window.	II
4 and 5 Martin Street; 52.80673°N 2.11658°W		c. 1840	Two houses on a corner site later used for other purposes, they are in brick with stone dressings, a first floor cornice, wide eaves, and a tile roof. There are three storeys, eight bays on Martin Street, one on St Martin's Place, and a curved bay on the corner. The doorway on the corner has baseless columns, panelled pilasters, a blocked fanlight, and an entablature. Above, the windows are curved with architraves. There is another doorway, to the left, with a segmental arch, a fanlight, and a keystone. The windows in the ground floor are sashes, and are separated by brick piers, they have segmental heads and aprons. The windows in the middle floor are sashes, in the top floor they are casements, all with wedge lintels.	II
Stafford Railway Building Society, 4 Market Square; 52.80757°N 2.11716°W		c. 1840	Originally a library, the building was extended in about 1870. It is in Classical style, and built in brick with stone facing, and a parapeted roof. There are three storeys, an original single bay and a five-bay extension to the left. In the ground floor is channelled rustication. The right bay upper floors are flanked by giant Corinthian pilasters, above which is a frieze and a cornice. In the ground floor are two round-headed windows, the middle floor contains a casement window with an architrave, and a cornice on consoles, in front is a balustraded balcony, it is flanked by narrow windows, and in the top floor is a square casement window. In the ground floor, from the left is a blocked round-headed entrance with a fanlight, a carriage entry with a segmental head, a decorative frieze, and a balcony on brackets, a doorway approached by steps, and a window, both with round heads. The upper floors contain sash windows, those in the middle floor with cornices on consoles. There are balustrades in front of the middle floor windows and at the top of the building.	II
39 and 40 Eastgate Street; 52.80641°N 2.11238°W		19th century (probable)	A pair of shops, they are rendered over timber framing, and have a tile roof. There is one storey and an attic, and one bay each. In the ground floor of each shop is a doorway and a window, and above is a gabled dormer. There are small dormers at the rear.	II
St Mary's Shopping Centre east building 52.80610°N 2.11783°W		1856	Originally a school designed by George Gilbert Scott, it was converted to become part of a shopping centre in 1990. The building is in Gothic style, in brick, with a front and left return in stone, and it has quoins and a tile roof with coped gables. On the front is a gabled porch, and the windows have three lights with trefoil heads. Along the front is a 20th-century canopy.	II
St Mary's Shopping Centre west building 52.80589°N 2.11808°W		1856	Originally a school and schoolmaster's house designed by George Gilbert Scott, it was converted to become part of a shopping centre in 1990. It is in brick with fronts in stone, quoins, and tile roofs with coped gables. The building is in Gothic style and has an L-shaped plan. The school has one storey and the house has two. The school has segmental-pointed headed doorways, windows with trefoil heads, a gabled dormer, a gabled porch in the angle, and 20th-century canopies. The house has a projecting gabled wing with a lean-to porch in the angle to the right and a raking dormer above.	II
Boundary wall and gates, St Chad's Church; 52.80611°N 2.11671°W		c. 1875	The wall and gates at the entrance to the forecourt of the church were designed by George Gilbert Scott. The wall is about 10 metres (33 ft) long, and is in stone on a plinth with offset coping. There are two gates flanked by shallow buttresses. The gates are in timber and contain wrought iron panels.	II
Borough Hall; 52.80722°N 2.11576°W		1877	The hall has a ground floor of stone, above it is in brick with diapering and stone dressings, and it has a slate roof. There are two storeys and a symmetrical front of nine bays. Above the ground floor is a frieze of shields, and at the top is a modillioned cornice, and a parapet. The middle bay projects slightly and is gabled, and here are two flanking gablets. The central doorway has polished marble shafts, and above it is a four-light window with a balcony. In the ground floor are six pointed arches of differing sizes on each side of the doorway. The upper floor contains two-light windows with shafts and a roundel above, and in the gable and gablets are wheel windows. To the left is a later extension with two storeys and three bays. It is in brick on a stone plinth with terracotta dressings. In the ground floor are windows with four-centred arched heads, and the upper floor contains three-light windows with pointed heads that have decorative aprons below, tympani above, and carved roundels between them.	II
78A Eastgate Street; 52.80702°N 2.11531°W		1893	The Superintendent's House, later an office, is in Free Tudor style. It is in brick with stone dressings on a stone plinth, and has bands, a top cornice, and a slate roof. There are two storeys, a basement and an attic, a double depth plan, a symmetrical front of three bays, and a gabled rear wing. In the centre is a recessed porch with a four-centred arch, a keystone, foliate spandrels, a panel with a cartouche and a hood mould, and the doorway has a segmental head. The windows are mullioned; in the ground floor they are recessed bow windows with fluted pilasters, the upper floor contains cross windows with cornices, and in the attic is a flat-roofed dormer flanked by dormers with hipped roofs and canted corners.	II
County Education Offices; 52.80597°N 2.11973°W		1896	A school, later offices, it is in red brick with stone dressings, and has string courses, entablature bands, and slate roofs. There are three storeys and a basement, seven bays facing Victoria Square, and eleven facing Earl Street. The doorway has a fanlight, and columns carrying a curved hood containing a cartouche. The windows are mullioned and transomed. On each front gabled areas project and contain tripartite windows with pediments.	II
Former National Westminster Bank, 3 Market Square; 52.80756°N 2.11732°W		c. 1900	The former bank is in Neoclassical style, and built in Portland stone with a pedimented roof. There are three storeys and three bays. The tall ground floor has an entablature below which it is rusticated, and contains a tetrastyle Corinthian portico over which is a parapet with two urns. Above the doorway is a large semicircular fanlight with a keystone on consoles. In the outer bays are sash windows with moulded sills and architraves, apron panels, and cornices on consoles. The middle floor contains sash windows with architraves, friezes and consoled cornices, the central window has a segmental pediment, and in front of the windows is a balustrade. In the top floor are square casement windows, and there is a small round window in the pediment.	II
Shelter, Victoria Park; 52.80418°N 2.12126°W		1905	The shelter is in cast iron and timber, and has a felt-clad hipped roof. It has a rectangular plan, and six bays. The cast iron columns have Ionic capitals and carry a cast iron fascia. On the north side is cresting incorporating a cartouche with an inscription.	II
15 Martin Street; 52.80668°N 2.11592°W		c.1913	The offices have a ground floor in stone, above they are in brick with stone dressings, and they have a modillioned cornice and a hipped tile roof. There are two storeys, a basement and an attic, and seven bays. The middle bay projects with channelled rusticated supports, pilaster strips, and a large curved broken open pediment containing an oeil-de-boeuf window and swags. The central doorway has a curved hood on carved consoles, and the window above has a pediment and an apron. The other windows are mullioned cross windows, in the top floor with moulded hoods, in the ground floor with aprons, and there are two three-light dormers.	II,
The Picture House; 52.80442°N 2.11617°W		1913	The former cinema is in brick, the front is stuccoed and has applied timber framing, and the roof is tiled and half-hipped. There are two storeys and three bays. The ground floor has polished granite cladding in the lower part, and is rusticated above. In the centre is the entrance with a reeded timber surround, and this is flanked by three plain windows on each side. Over the ground floor is a glazed canopy on cast iron brackets, and in the fascia is stained glass with a design including the name. In the upper floor the middle bay contains a timber-framed gable with decorative bargeboards, under which is a five-light mullioned window. The outer bays have relief stucco decoration and contain small-paned windows.	II
County War Memorial, Victoria Park; 52.80445°N 2.12171°W		c. 1920	The war memorial stands in a square terrace, partly surrounded by low walls. It consists of a stone cenotaph on a plinth surmounted by the figures of a winged female and a horse on a rock in bronze. On the plinth are inscribed bronze plaques, the cenotaph has a moulded base, and on it are carved cap badges, and above them is a Stafford knot in bronze. Flanking the front of the memorial are canted walls inscribed with the names of battles, and containing wrought iron gates.	II
Stafford Borough War Memorial, Victoria Square; 52.80566°N 2.11966°W		c. 1920	The war memorial, by Joseph Whitehead, has a base of Portland stone. The tall body of the memorial stands on a plinth on two square steps, and on the top is a bronze statue of a soldier in uniform, with a rifle in his left hand, waving his helmet and cheering. There is an inscription on the plinth, and on the main body are the names of those lost in the war.	II
16 Martin Street; 52.80666°N 2.11627°W		c. 1925	The offices have a ground floor in stone, above they are in brick with stone dressings, and they have a modillioned cornice and a tile roof. There are two storeys and an attic, and five bays. The central projecting doorway has a moulded surround, and a pediment on carved consoles, and above it is a panel with carved swags and volutes. The windows are mullioned cross windows, in the top floor with moulded hoods, in the ground floor with aprons, and there are two three-light dormers.	II
Four telephone kiosks, Market Square; 52.80748°N 2.11740°W		1935	A group of K6 telephone kiosks, designed by Giles Gilbert Scott. They are in cast iron and have a square plan and a saucer-domed roof. There are low relief crowns in the top panels, and margin-light glazing to the windows and the door.	II
Stafford College: Tenterbanks Building; 52.80541°N 2.12071°W		c. 1937	The college building is in red-brown brick with stone dressings, a rusticated ground floor, rusticated pilaster panels, moulded panels between the floors, a deep cornice and a blocking course, and a parapeted roof. There are three storeys and 19 bays. In the centre is a recessed doorway flanked by columns, on the curved corner is a balustrade, and at the top are urns.	II
