= Staffordshire County Council =

British administrative authority

Type
- Type: County council

Leadership
- Chair: Paul Williams, Reform since 22 May 2025
- Leader: Vacant since 27 October 2026
- Chief Executive: Pat Flaherty since July 2023

Structure
- Seats: 62 councillors
- Graph of the party split among 62 seats.
- Political groups: Administration (43) Reform (43) Other parties (19) Conservative (11) Green (1) Labour (1) Liberal Democrats (1) Stafford Ind. (1) Independent (4)
- Length of term: 4 years

Elections
- Voting system: First past the post
- Last election: 1 May 2025
- Next election: 2029

Meeting place
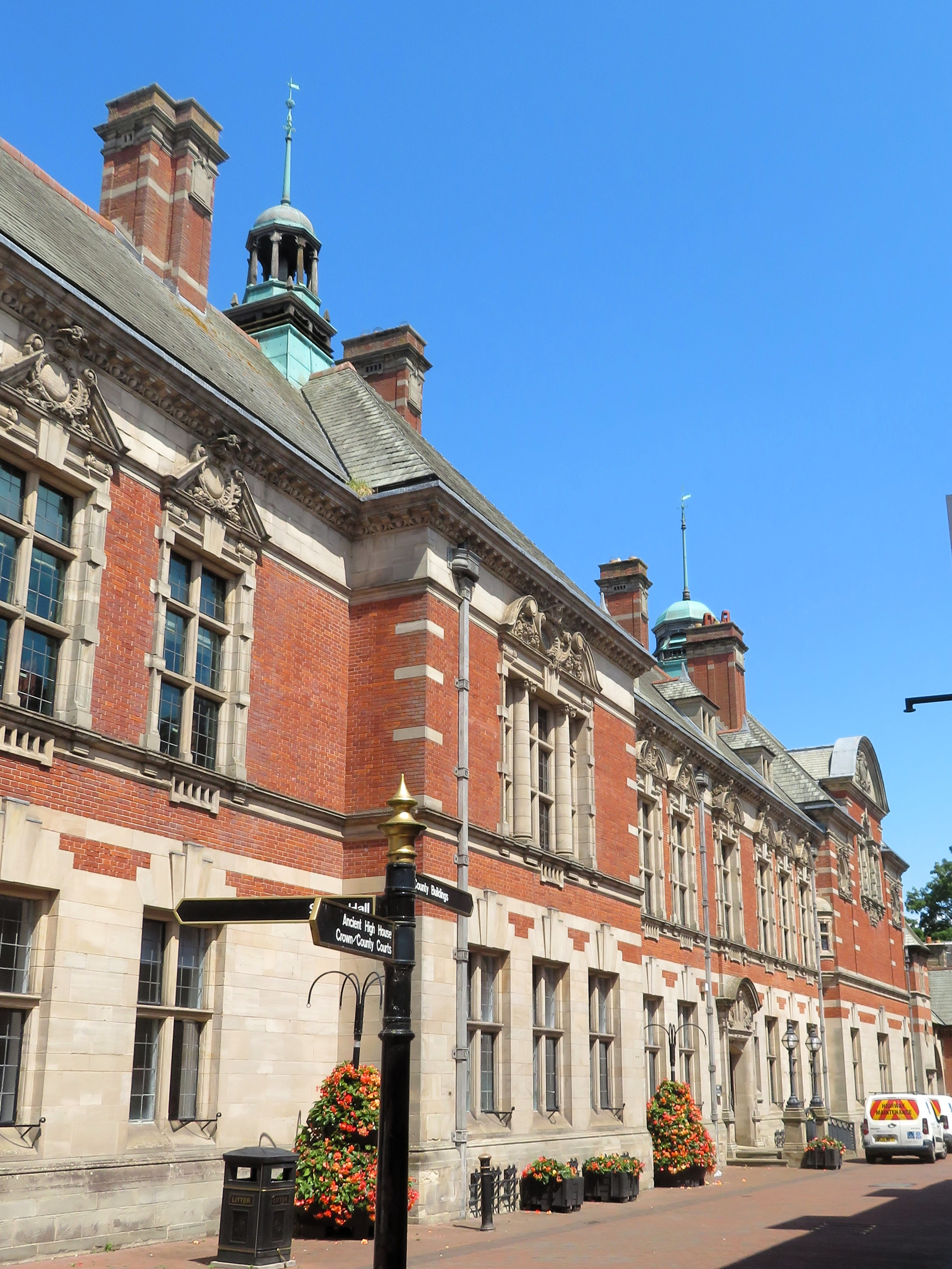
- County Buildings, Martin Street, Stafford, ST16 2LH

Website
- www.staffordshire.gov.uk

Staffordshire County Council is the upper-tier local authority for the non-metropolitan county of Staffordshire, England. The non-metropolitan county is smaller than the ceremonial county, which additionally includes Stoke-on-Trent.

The council has been under Reform majority control since 2025. It meets at County Buildings in Stafford and has its main offices nearby at Staffordshire Place on Tipping Street.

== History ==
Elected county councils were created in 1889 under the Local Government Act 1888, taking over many administrative functions that had previously been performed by unelected magistrates at the quarter sessions. The four boroughs of Hanley, Walsall, West Bromwich and Wolverhampton were considered large enough to provide their own county-level services and so they were made county boroughs, independent from the new county council. Conversely the city of Lichfield, which had been a self-governing county corporate since 1553 with its own sheriffs and quarter sessions, was not considered large enough to be a county borough and so it was included in the county council's area. The county council was elected by and provided services to the part of the county outside the county boroughs, which area was termed the administrative county.

The 1888 Act also said that urban sanitary districts which straddled county boundaries were to be placed entirely in the county which had the majority of their population, and so Staffordshire gained the parts of Burton upon Trent which had been in Derbyshire and the parts of Tamworth which had been in Warwickshire, but lost the parts of Dudley which had been in Staffordshire to Worcestershire.

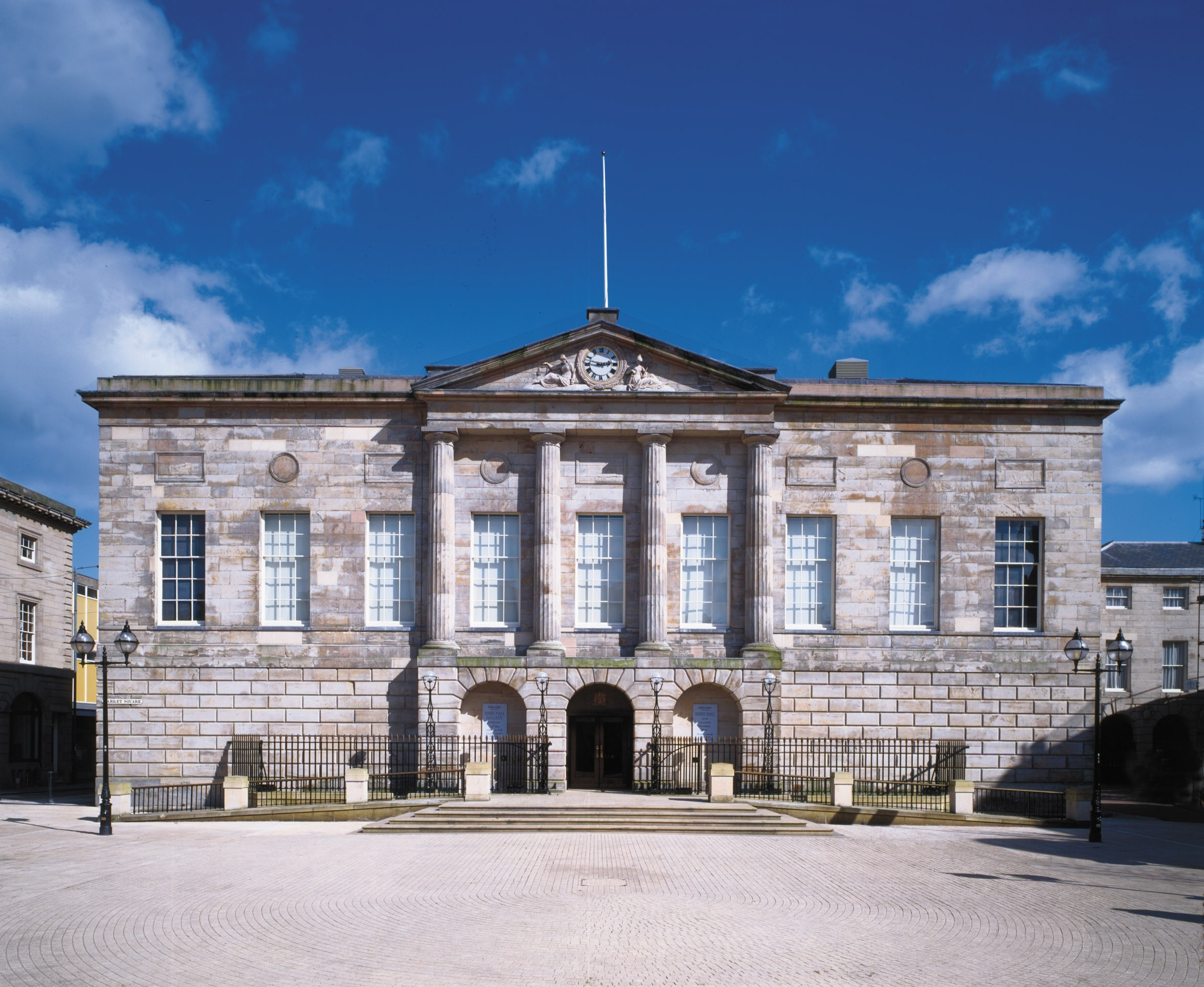
Shire Hall, Stafford: Council's first meeting place

The first elections to the county council were held in January 1889. The council formally came into being on 1 April 1889, on which day it held its first official meeting at the Shire Hall in Stafford, the courthouse which had served as the meeting place for the quarter sessions which preceded the county council. The first chairman of the council was Dudley Ryder, 3rd Earl of Harrowby, a Conservative peer and former member of parliament.

Additional county boroughs were later created at Burton upon Trent in 1901 and Smethwick in 1907, removing them from the administrative county. In 1910 the administrative county ceded Burslem, Fenton, Longton, Stoke-upon-Trent and Tunstall to the new County Borough of Stoke on Trent, which also took in the previous county borough of Hanley. Territory was also transferred on a number of occasions from Staffordshire to the neighbouring county borough of Birmingham, which gained Harborne in 1891, Handsworth in 1911, and Perry Barr in 1928. In 1966 the administrative county ceded eleven urban districts and one municipal borough in the Black Country area at the southern end of the county to become parts of county boroughs.

Staffordshire was reconstituted as a non-metropolitan county in 1974 under the Local Government Act 1972. The county council regained authority over Burton and Stoke, but lost the Aldridge-Brownhills Urban District to the new West Midlands county (which also covered the county boroughs in the area that were already outside the administrative county). The lower tier of local government was reorganised as part of the same reforms. Previously it had comprised numerous boroughs, urban districts and rural districts; they were reorganised into nine non-metropolitan districts.

Stoke-on-Trent regained its independence from the county council in 1997, when its city council became a unitary authority, leaving eight districts in the county council's area.

== Abolition ==
In July 2026, the UK Government announced that it intends to reorganise Staffordshire into two unitary authority areas by April 2028. The county will be divided north-south, with the northern area combining the current districts of Newcastle-under-Lyme, Stoke-on-Trent, and Staffordshire Moorlands, to form a new North Staffordshire unitary authority, and the southern area combining the current districts of Cannock Chase, East Staffordshire, Lichfield, South Staffordshire, Stafford, and Tamworth to form a new Southern and Mid Staffordshire unitary authority. Elections to the new unitary councils will take place in May 2027.

== Governance ==
Staffordshire County Council provides county-level services. District-level services are provided by the area's eight district councils:

- Cannock Chase District Council
- East Staffordshire Borough Council
- Lichfield District Council
- Newcastle-under-Lyme Borough Council
- South Staffordshire District Council
- Stafford Borough Council
- Staffordshire Moorlands District Council
- Tamworth Borough Council

Much of the county is also covered by civil parishes, which form a third tier of local government.

=== Political control ===
The council has been under Reform UK majority control since the 2025 election.

Political control of the council since the 1974 reforms has been as follows:

Party in control	Years
Labour	1974–1977
Conservative	1977–1981
Labour	1981–2009
Conservative	2009–2025
Reform	2025–present

=== Leadership ===
The leaders of the council since 1974 have been:

Councillor	Party	From	To
Jim Westwood	Labour	1 Apr 1974	May 1977
Rex Roberts	Conservative	May 1977	May 1981
Bill Austin	Labour	May 1981	May 1996
Terry Dix	Labour	May 1996	17 May 2007
John Taylor	Labour	17 May 2007	Jun 2009
Philip Atkins	Conservative	18 Jun 2009	23 Jul 2020
Alan White	Conservative	23 Jul 2020	May 2025
Ian Cooper (Note: Ian Cooper had his membership of Reform UK revoked on 5 December 2025 and stood down as council leader on 9 December 2025. The deputy leader, Martin Murray, then served as acting leader until he was formally appointed as leader in March 2026.)	Reform	22 May 2025	9 Dec 2025
Chris Large	Reform	30 Jan 2026	Feb 2026
Martin Murray	Reform	26 Mar 2026	27 Oct 2026

=== Composition ===
Following the 2025 election and subsequent changes up to June 2026, the composition of the council was:

Party	Seats
Reform	44
Conservative	12
Green	1
Labour	1
Stafford Ind.	1
Independent	3
Total	62

== Elections ==
Since the last boundary changes in 2013 the council has comprised 62 councillors representing 60 electoral divisions, with each division electing one or two councillors. Elections are held every four years.

== Premises ==
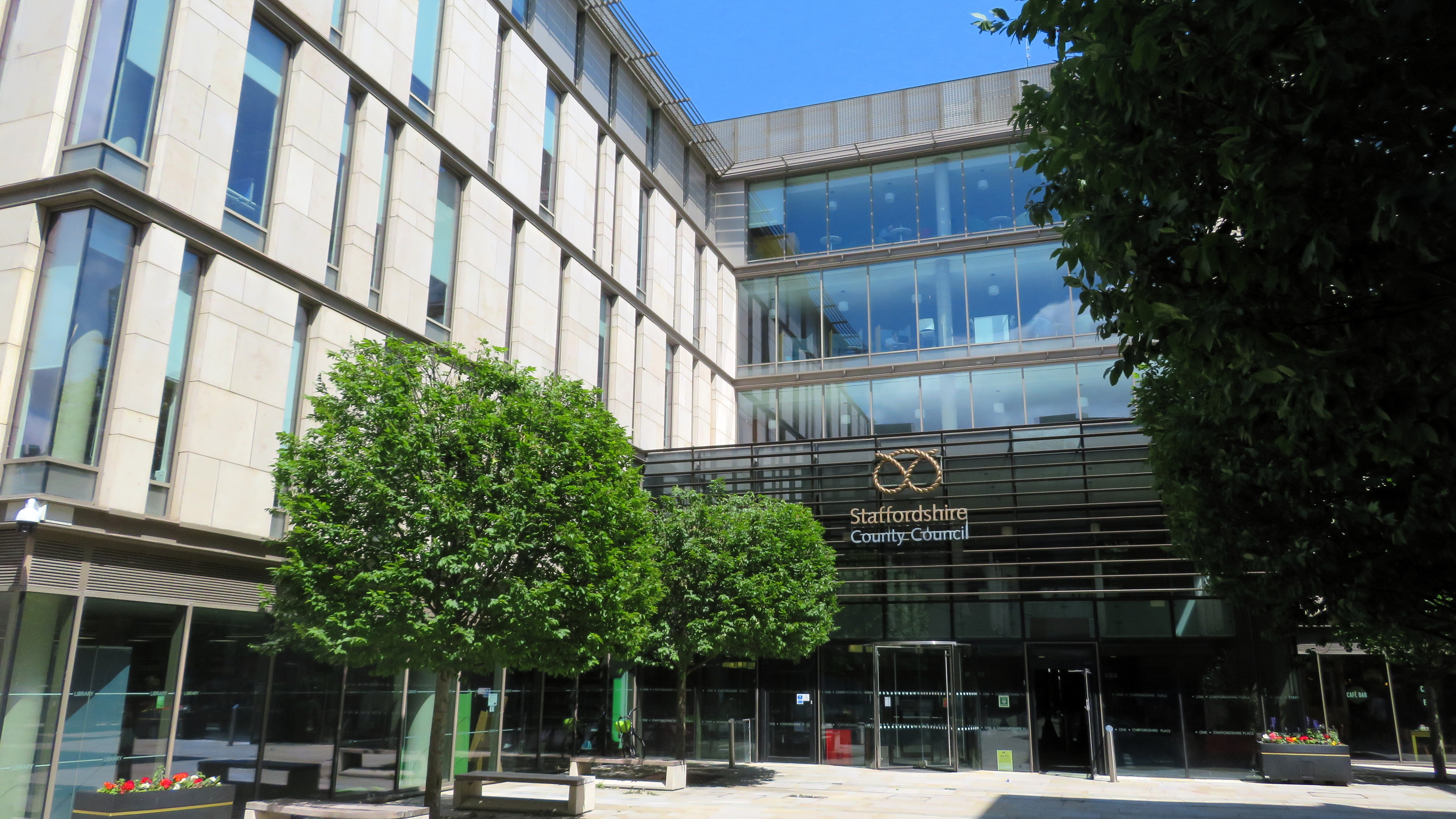
1 Staffordshire Place, Stafford, ST16 2DH: Council's main offices since 2011

The council has its main offices at Staffordshire Place, a modern office development off Tipping Street in Stafford. Staffordshire Place was purpose-built for the council in 2011.

When the county council was first created in 1889 it met at the Shire Hall in the Market Place in Stafford, which had been completed in 1798. Shortly after the council's creation it built itself a new meeting place and offices at County Buildings on Martin Street, adjoining the side of Shire Hall, with the new building opening in 1895. The council later outgrew County Buildings, and by the early 21st century its offices were spread across seventeen different buildings. The construction of Staffordshire Place in 2011 allowed for the consolidation of most of the council's offices at the one site, although the nearby County Buildings was retained by the council, with the council chamber there continuing to serve as the council's meeting place.
