= Ancient High House =

Historic house in Stafford, England

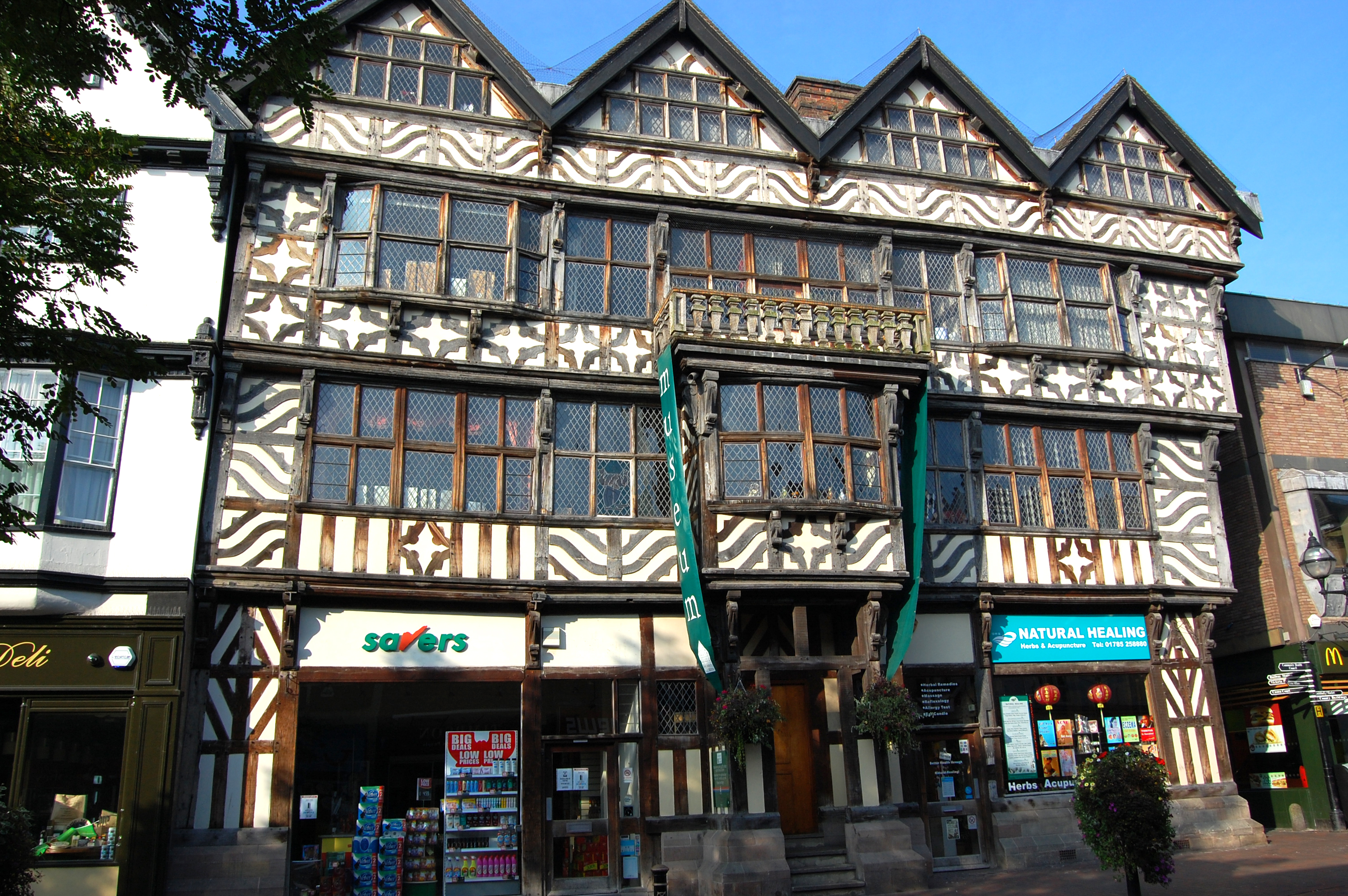
- Interactive map of the Ancient High House area

General information
- Type: Town house
- Architectural style: Timber framed
- Location: Stafford, England
- Coordinates: 52.8062°N 2.1172°W
- Completed: 1595
- Client: Dorrington family
- Owner: Stafford Borough Council

Design and construction
- Architect: Richard Dorrington

Website
- historicstafford.co.uk

The Ancient High House is an Elizabethan town house located on the main street in Stafford. The house was constructed in 1595 by the Dorrington family, from local oak, which anecdotally came from the nearby Doxey Wood, and is the largest timber framed town house in England.

== History ==
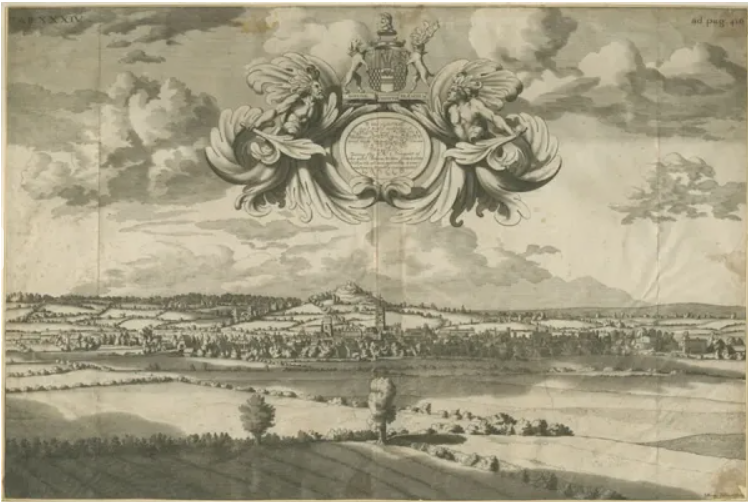
Stafford as seen from Cotton Hill in 1686 by Michael Burghers; the Ancient High House can be seen between St. Mary's and St. Chad's churches

Many of the original timbers bear carpenter's marks indicating that the frame was pre-assembled on the ground and the joints numbered to aid the on-site construction. Some timbers have additional joint housings cut into them, which would suggest that they have been reused from an even earlier structure. It was not unheard of for a building to be dismantled and rebuilt at a different location - hence the expression to 'up-sticks', which means to move house. Richard Dorrington constructed the house in 1595 and he died two years later, leaving the house to let for several years. The Ancient High House was probably the "house which I now dwelle in" which Francis Dorrington (Mayor of Stafford) returned to live at during 1612, although it is not mentioned by name again until 1622 when Francis Dorrington paid a duty to the town for the porch encroaching into the nearby street.

At the time of the outbreak of the English Civil War in 1642, Richard Sneyd of Keele Hall, near Newcastle-under-Lyme, was renting the building.

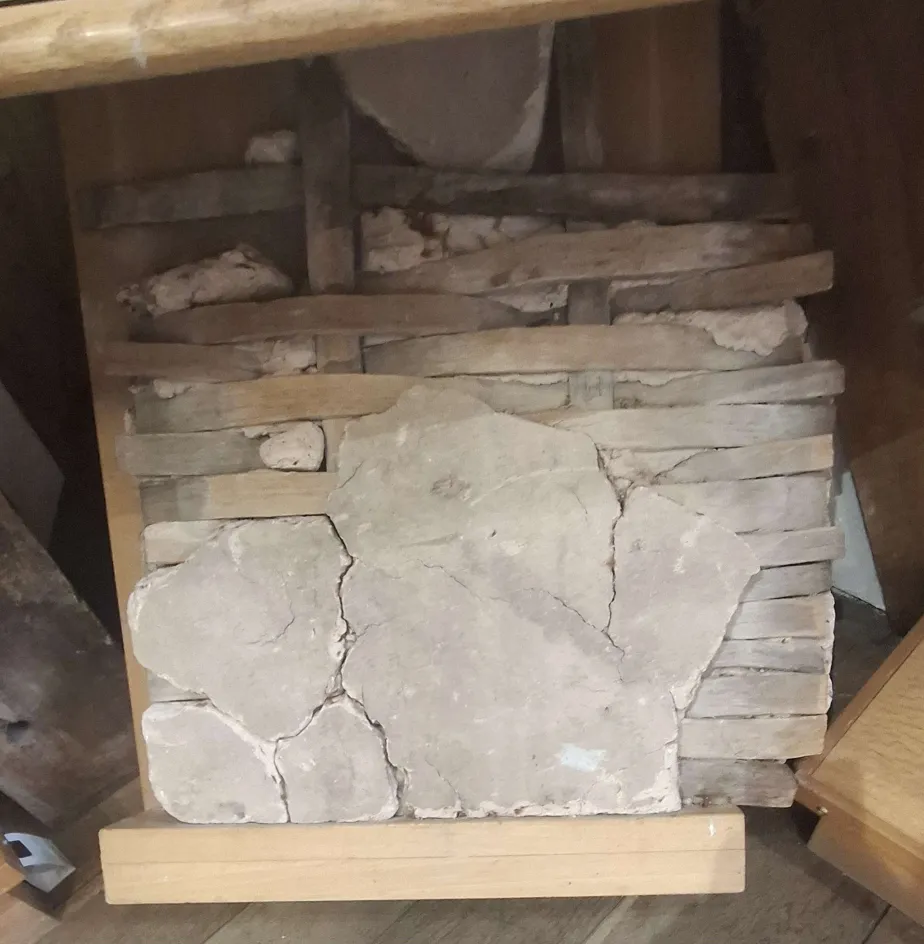
A surviving section of the wattle and daub from the construction of the house; dates to shortly before 1595

Charles I visited Stafford and stayed at the Ancient High House on 17 and 18 September 1643, not long after raising the Royal Standard at Nottingham, the feudal signal to call his loyal subjects to arms - this act was seen as the start of the English Civil War.

Having made the High House his temporary headquarters, the King talked to his advisers and dictated letters and military orders for the forthcoming campaign (some of these have been preserved in the nearby William Salt Library). While in Stafford the King attended St Mary's Collegiate Church, an account being made by a local woman for the strewing of flowers along his route to the church.

There is a story that while walking in the garden of the High House with the King, Prince Rupert fired two shots through the tail of the weather vane of St Mary's in order to demonstrate the accuracy of a continental Horse Pistol. The weather vane was removed several centuries ago, and so the story cannot be verified, although the pistol Prince Rupert is said to have fired was far more accurate than most of the weapons then in use.

In May 1643, the King's enemies, the Parliamentarians, captured the town and in the following January, the newly established Committee of Stafford ordered:

that the High House of Mr Dorringtons in tenure of Mr Lees shall be forthwith assigned to Mr Roberts the Provost Marshal to habite in for the securing of the better sort of prisoners...

These prisoners were Royalists.

The main room of the house would have been the central room on the first floor, and it is here that guests, including King Charles I and Prince Rupert, would have been entertained. Today a tableau represents the scene during the visit of the King who stayed as a guest of Captain Richard Sneed. The King was accompanied by his nephew, Prince Rupert of the Rhine (and his Standard Poodle called 'Boy'), who was already an accomplished military commander.

Sneyd died in 1655 and the last mention of the Dorrington family owning the house was when William Dorrington owned the building. Anne Sneyd owned the house in 1693, and it was let out again to tenants such as William Murhall (Mayor of Stafford), Robert Bosville, George Hunt, and Thomas Neville.

The Ancient High House was then owned by Brooke Cutchley (Mayor of Stafford) by 1759, and before 1774 the house was divided into two sets of dwellings and the wallpaper was also altered around 1760. Cutchley left the house to his wife Elizabeth when he died in 1777, and she married Thomas Fowler in 1781, and he notably discovered Fowler's solution.

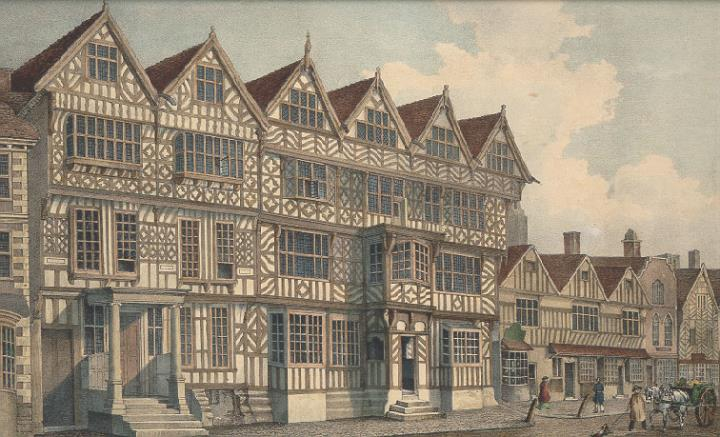
The earliest known depiction solely of the Ancient High House by Robert John Ferneyhough, 1823

The house was sold in 1792 to William Fieldhouse for £320 (£24,563.55 in 2017) and after he died in 1803, many failed attempts were made to sell the house. A small section was eventually opened as a boarding school for young women in 1811, and Fieldhouse's wife lived in the building until 1822, when Thomas Feynhouse purchased it. Feynhouse sold the house in 1825 to Henry Jenkinson who converted the ground floor into shops; the northernmost shop was let out to John Marson (Mayor of Stafford) starting from 27 September 1827 and he later purchased the whole building during the 1830s for £25,000 (£1,695,032.50 in 2017) with surviving graffiti suggesting tenants slept in the attic during 1840. His son William Albert was born at the Ancient High House in 1840 and he began to run the shop with his brother James during the 1850s until he took over after James died in 1876. The Marson family had moved out by 1891 and he sold it to R. J. Young in 1908 who owned it until the 1940s. It was flats in the 1960s.

The structure was weakened by renovations to the ground floor in the 19th century. This work included the knocking-through of a stone fireplace to create a corridor and the removal of one of the corner posts, which lead to a splaying of the overhanging upper storeys. A second chimney was demolished to create more space, this taking place following the advent of electricity when the rooms were presumably kept warm in winter by portable heaters.

In 1972, there were rumours that the High house was going to have to be demolished due to the amount of work that was needed. It was then that the townsfolk got together and a group was formed to raise funds to "save the Ancient High House". At weekends people would have stalls selling souvenirs and encouraging people to donate. Local band "the Climax Blues Band" held an event at a local night club and raised a substantial amount towards the cause. There was talk of a "Blue Plaque" to commemorate the band's efforts, sadly this never transpired. As a result of this, restoration work successfully took place between 1975 and 1985, restoring the building to the initial plan drawn up by Richard Dorrington shortly before 1595.

== Today ==
The Ancient High House was opened as historic house museum in June 1986 with a collection of period room furnishings and displays, including the English Civil War, Edwardian and Victorian eras. Three galleries feature changing art, photography and history exhibitions, and the museum is operated by the Stafford Borough Council and entry is free of charge. The Staffordshire Yeomanry Museum, founded around 1794, is housed in the attic floor, and features uniforms and artefacts of the Staffordshire Yeomanry.

The Ancient High House adjoins 'Shaw's House', built around 1545, and the 'Swan', with Elizabethan origins, while close by may be found St Chad's Church and the Collegiate Church of St Mary's, Stafford.
