= Mayor of Stafford =

Head of Stafford, Staffordshire, England

The town of Stafford, Staffordshire, England gained its mayoral charter from King James I. The first mayor was Matthew Cradock, jnr in 1614.

The following have been mayors of Stafford:

Source: Stafford Borough Council unless otherwise stated

- 1614–15 Matthew Cradock, First Mayor of Stafford, MP for Stafford 5 times between 1621 and 1628
- 1622 Thomas Worswick
- 1704 William Green
- 1706 William Abnett
- 1708 Abraham Hoskins
- 1716 Abraham Hoskins
- 1719 William Robins
- 1720 William Abnett
- 1731 William Robins
- 1740 William Robins

== 19th century ==
Source: Stafford Borough Council

- 1836 John Masfen Jn. Kenderdine Shaw
- 1837 William Jones
- 1838 Charles Dudley
- 1839 Thomas Stevenson
- 1840 Edward Lloyd
- 1841 John Rogers
- 1842 Charles Chester Mort
- 1843 Thomas Boulton
- 1844 John Griffin
- 1845 Charles Ed Morgan
- 1846 James Webb
- 1847 John Marson
- 1848 James Turnock
- 1849 Thomas Benson Elley
- 1850 Thomas Benson Elley
- 1851 William Jones, Jun.
- 1852 Thomas Turner
- 1853 Thomas Boulton
- 1854 John Henson Webb
- 1855 John Griffin
- 1856 John Griffin
- 1857 John Griffin
- 1858 Henry Thos Lomax
- 1859 John Lea
- 1860 William Buxton
- 1861 William Buxton
- 1862 John Brewster
- 1863 Jonas Pilling
- 1864 Edward Mousley
- 1865 Edward Mousley
- 1866 John Morgan
- 1867 William Silvester
- 1868 Richard Podmore
- 1869 Ephraim Austin
- 1870 Henry Gillard
- 1871 Hugh Woods Gibson
- 1872 Bateman P Wright
- 1873 John Kelsall
- 1874 John Shallcross
- 1875 John Shallcross
- 1876 Jas C Marson (deceased)
- 1876 H W Gibson (successor)
- 1877 John Averill
- 1878 Frederic Marson
- 1879 William Wright
- 1880 John Tasker Evans
- 1881 Chas Henry Dudley
- 1882 Chas Henry Dudley
- 1883 Zachariah Anderson
- 1884 Frederic Greatrex
- 1885 Nicholas Joyce
- 1886 Wm Henry Peach
- 1887 Alfred Ward
- 1888 Cornelius Mycock
- 1889 Thomas Amies
- 1890 William Peach
- 1891 William Lloyd
- 1892 William Silvester
- 1893 George Wormal
- 1894 Charles Henry Wright
- 1895 Wm Hy Turkington
- 1896 Frederick Greatrex
- 1897 Walter Charles Towers Mynors
- 1898 Walter Charles Towers Mynors
- 1899 Walter Charles Towers Mynors

== 20th century ==
- 1900–03 Walter Charles Towers Mynors (2 years (of 4))
- 1902–03 P M Bridgwood (Conservative)
- 1903–04 Samuel George Lovatt
- 1904–05 John Mottram
- 1905–06 William Marson
- 1906–07 Albert Andrews
- 1907–09 Ebenezer Williamm Taylor (2 years)
- 1909–10 Edward Horton
- 1910–11 Thomas Westhead
- 1911–12 Ebenezer William Taylor
- 1912–13 Charles William Miller
- 1913–14 James Cornelius Mycock
- 1914–15 Henry John Bostock
- 1915–16 Thomas Samuel Bailey
- 1916–17 Richard John Young
- 1917–18 -
- 1918–19 Joseph Rushton
- 1919–20 Frederick Milnes Blumer
- 1920–21 Richard Edwin Meade
- 1921–22 Thomas Alfred Dunn
- 1922–23 Ernest Albert Thompson
- 1923–24 John Wheeldon
- 1924–25 Harry Eymer
- 1925–26 John Hall
- 1926–30 William Thomas Richardson (4 years)
- 1930–32 Thomas Henry Tunnicliffe (2 years)
- 1932–33 Ellen Maria South (Mrs)
- 1933–34 Samuel Robinson
- 1934–35 Frederick William Pitt (died and replaced by Samuel Robinson)
- 1935–37 George Owen (2 years)
- 1937–38 R Gordon Amies
- 1938–42 Horace Joynes (4 years)
- 1942–44 Arthur Egerton Hourd (2 years)
- 1944–46 Harold Wallace-Copeland (2 years)
- 1946–48 Ruth Turney (Mrs) (3 years)
- 1949–50 Leslie Dobson (2 years)
- 1951–53 Charles Edward Fowke (2 years)
- 1953–55 Charles Jones (2 years)
- 1955–57 Horace Henry Coghlan (2 years)
- 1957–59 Frank Redvers Green (2 years)
- 1959–60 Bertram Sinkinson
- 1960–61 John Edward Roberts
- 1961–62 Elizabeth Wilford (Mrs)
- 1962–63 Rees Llewellyn Tyler
- 1963–64 Albert Edward Collins
- 1964–65 Iris Helen Moseley (Miss)
- 1965–66 Lawrence Harry Kinson
- 1966–67 Samuel Harry Robinson
- 1967–68 Stanley Gordon Sheppard
- 1968–69 Oliver Frederick Bradley
- 1969–70 Trevor Arnold Evans
- 1970–71 Walter Richard Dean
- 1971–72 Edith Stella Kidman
- 1972–73 Norman Leonard Potter
- 1973–74 William Robert Simpson
- 1974–75 Ruth M Dickson
- 1975–76 William Bowen
- 1976–77 Roland E Tonge
- 1977–78 George H Mason
- 1978–79 Harold Doffman
- 1979–80 Leonard Jacques
- 1980–81 Michael Dale
- 1981–82 Mavis V Keleghan
- 1982–83 Trevor J Reeves
- 1983–84 Michael H Roberts
- 1984–85 Hugh Lowry
- 1985–86 Graham Will
- 1986–87 Barbara H Bower
- 1987–88 Douglas J James
- 1988–89 Matthew H Guymer
- 1989–90 William J Kemp
- 1990–91 Michael R Heenan
- 1991–92 Stuart Glaister
- 1992–93 Frances Salome Dainton
- 1993–94 Andrew Compton
- 1994–95 Kenneth F Brown
- 1995–96 Ellis A J Bevan
- 1996–97 John T Holland
- 1997–98 Judith M Dalgarno
- 1998–99 Harry Brunt
- 1999–2000 Christine A Baron

== 21st century ==
- 2000–01 Peter Bruce
- 2001–02 Douglas W Davies
- 2002–03 Ralph P Cooke
- 2003–04 John A Russell
- 2004–05 Francis A Finlay
- 2005–06 Joyce Farnham
- 2006–07 Mike Shone
- 2007–08 David Brian Price
- 2008–09 Ann P Edgeller
- 2009–10 Jean E Tabernor
- 2010–11 Malcolm T Millichap
- 2011–12 James S Highfield
- 2012–13 Bryan M Cross
- 2013–14 Angela M Loughran
- 2014–15 Raymond M Sutherland
- 2015–16 Peter W Jones
- 2016–17 Geoffrey R Collier
- 2017–18 Aidan Thomas Arthur Godfrey
- 2018–19 Raymond Barron
- 2019–20 Gareth Jones
- 2020–21 Gareth Jones
- 2021–22 Anthony Nixon
- 2022–23 Philip A Leason
- 2023–24 Andy Cooper
- 2024–25 Frank D J James
- 2025–26 Jenny Barron
