= Shire Hall, Stafford =

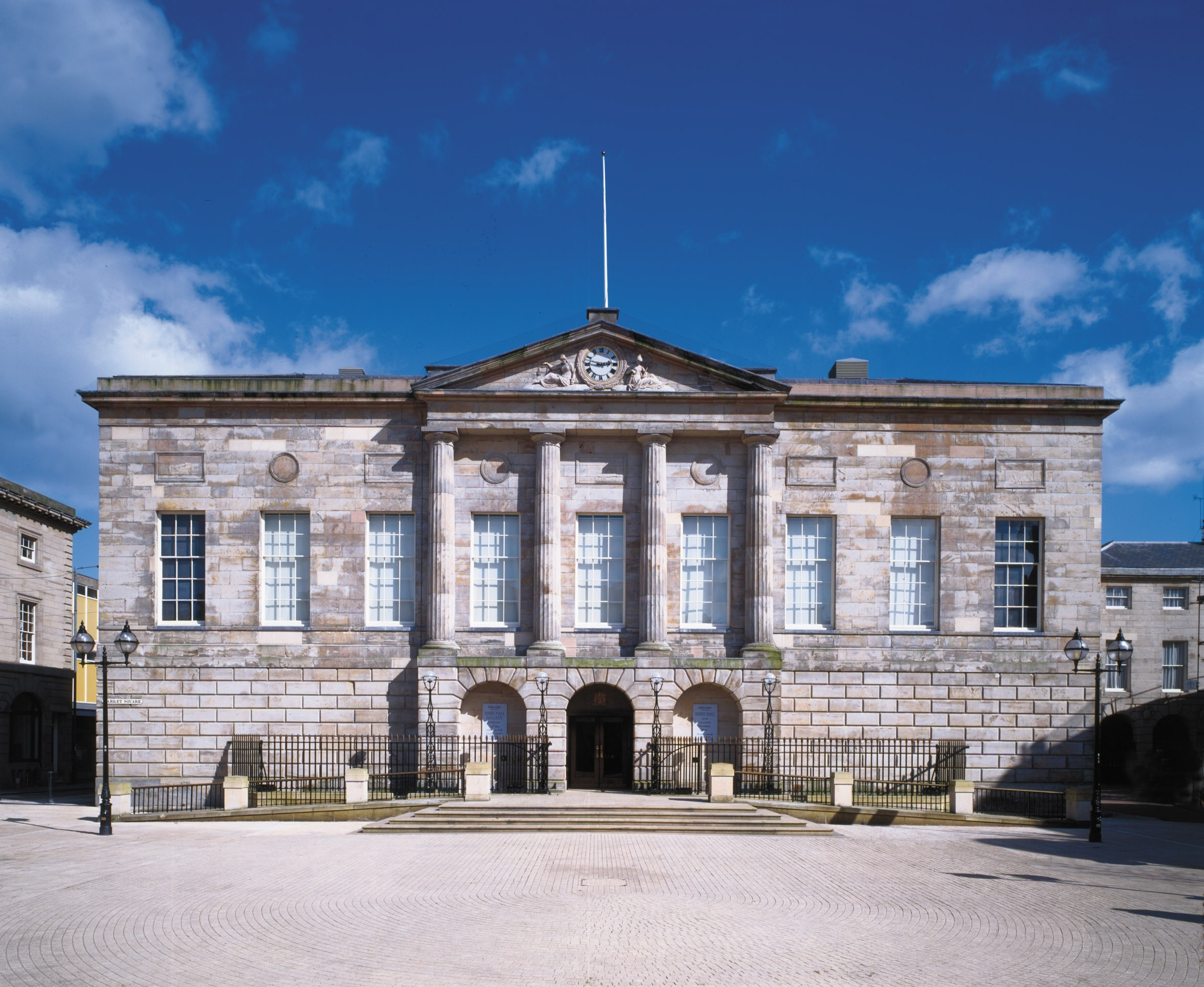

- Location within Staffordshire
- 52.8073°N 2.1167°W
- Location: Stafford, Staffordshire

History
- Built: 1798

Site notes
- Architect: John Harvey
- Architectural style: Neoclassical style

Listed Building – Grade II*
- Designated: 16 January 1951
- Reference no.: 1298177

The Shire Hall is a public building in Stafford, England, completed in 1798 to a design by John Harvey. Formerly a courthouse, it housed an art gallery which closed to the public in July 2017. The court rooms and cells are preserved. The building, its interiors, and the associated street furniture were grade II* listed on 17 December 1971, when it was described as "One of the finest public buildings in Stafford".

== Earlier buildings ==
Stafford Shire Hall Act 1794
- Act of Parliament
- Parliament of Great Britain
- Long title: An act for building a new Shire-hall for the county of Stafford.
- Citation: 34 Geo. 3. c. 97
- Territorial extent: Great Britain

Dates
- Royal assent: 9 May 1794
- Commencement: 9 May 1794 (Note: The Acts of Parliament (Commencement) Act 1793.)
- Repealed: 28 June 1853
Other legislation
| Amended by | Staffordshire Judges' Lodgings Act 1812 |
| Repealed by | Stafford Shire Hall Act 1853 |

Status: Repealed

Text of statute as originally enacted

The current building is the third of similar function on the site. The county court met in Stafford as early as 1176. A shire hall, home to the county court and other civic functions, stood on the north side of what is now Market Square in the 1280s. In the 1580s, the decision was made to rebuild the shire hall, on a new site, but this was not completed until 1607, probably due to difficulties raising the money needed. By 1793, it had been decided, due to the building’s poor condition caused by inadequate maintenance, that a new building was needed, and the Stafford Shire Hall Act 1794 (34 Geo. 3. c. 97) was passed by Parliament.

== Architecture ==
Designs were submitted by Samuel Wyatt, then working at nearby Shugborough Hall, and by John Nash, but the one chosen was by John Harvey - his only significant building. Harvey had worked as Wyatt's assistant or pupil, and Wyatt is believed to have been involved in the final Neoclassical style design.

Building began in 1795, and the hall was completed in 1798. The hall has nine ashlar bays above a rusticated ground floor. The portico has an architrave and pediment, supported by four Doric columns. Figures of Justice and Mercy, by John Rossi and his partner John Bingley, recline on the pediment. A clock was placed between them in 1799, instead of the planned figure of Britannia from Harvery's original design. Also abandoned was Wyatt's proposal to include judges' living accommodation.

== Interior ==
Immediately behind the facade is the Great Hall, 72 by 32 by 39 feet (22 m × 10 m × 12 m), with three galleries. Beyond this are the two courtrooms: Court 1 (now open to the public, with displays of museum artefacts related to crime and policing) for the High Court and Court 2, the magistrates' court. The latter has many original fittings, but the former was enlarged by the county surveyor, Charles Trubshaw, and refitted by local joiner Thomas Bull, in 1854.

Stafford Shire Hall Act 1853 (Note: Section 36.)
- Act of Parliament
- Parliament of the United Kingdom
- Long title: An Act for enlarging and improving the Shire Hall of the County of Stafford; removing the Markets at the Back of the Hall, and providing other Market Accommodation in lieu thereof; erecting Rooms and Offices for the Town Council of Stafford; and for other Purposes.
- Citation: 16 & 17 Vict. c. lxxii
- Territorial extent: United Kingdom

Dates
- Royal assent: 28 June 1853
- Commencement: 28 June 1853
- Repealed: 21 March 1984
Other legislation
| Repeals/revokes | Stafford Shire Hall Act 1794 |
| Repealed by | Staffordshire Act 1983 |

Status: Repealed

Text of statute as originally enacted

The 1854 remodelling, authorised by the Stafford Shire Hall Act 1853 (16 & 17 Vict. c. lxxii), extended the building over a market for dairy produce, The Butter Market. As a result, a new market hall was built nearby, across the market square. The basement included a guard room (holding cell) for prisoners, and the Mayor of Stafford's office. In 1947, one of the courtrooms was used in the filming of Blanche Fury, starring Stewart Granger.

== Judges ==
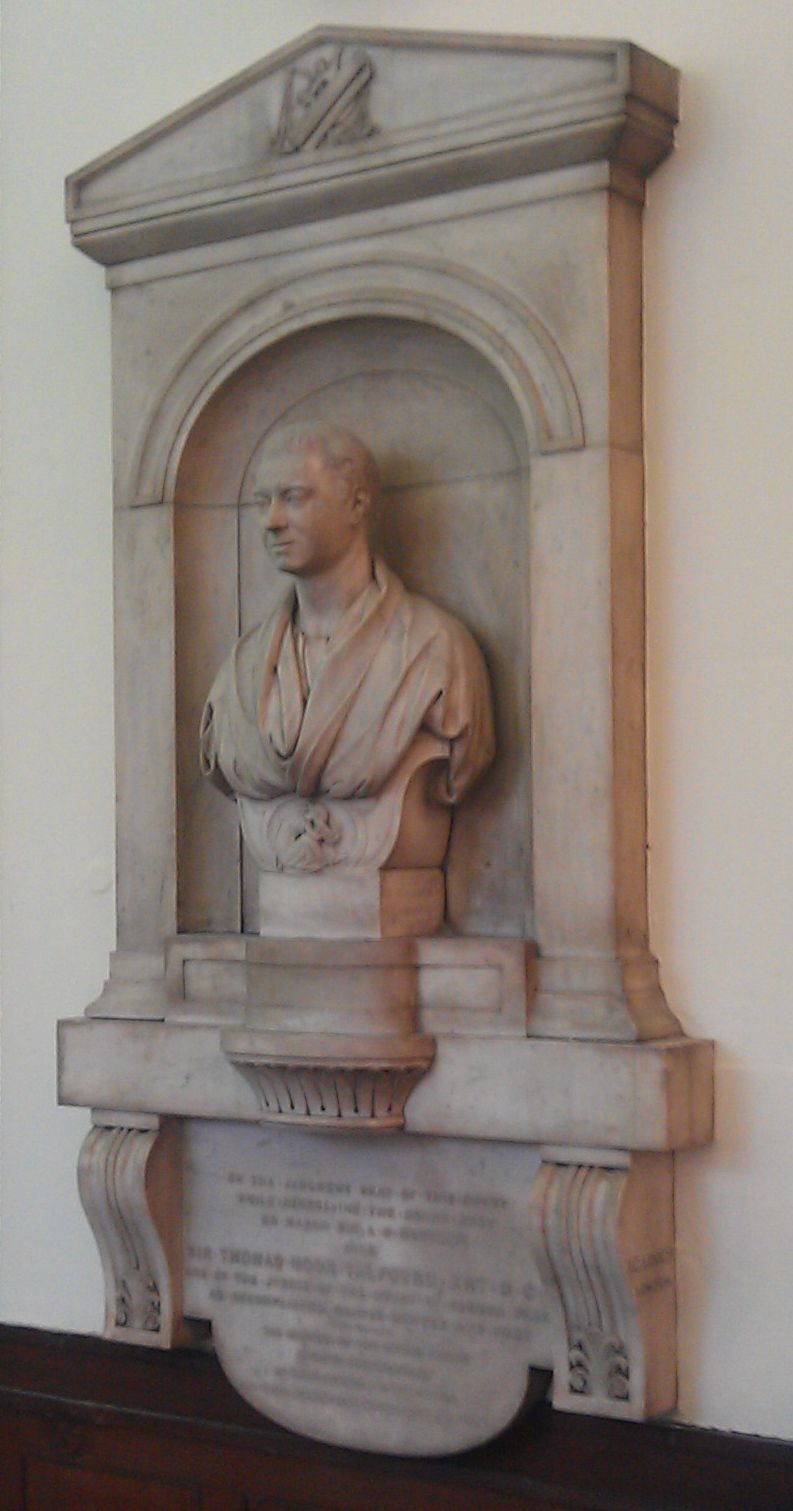
The memorial to Thomas Noon Talfourd

John Sparrow was chairman of Stafford Quarter Sessions when the new building opened. His portrait, by William Owen, is in Court 2. Another judge, Thomas Noon Talfourd, collapsed and died while in the court. He is commemorated by a bust, sculpted by John Graham Lough, in Court 1.

== Trials ==
Among those tried at the Shire Hall were the forger William Booth, who was convicted before Simon Le Blanc and hanged outside Stafford Gaol in 1812. The trial in the case of the murder of Christina Collins was held there in July 1839: Colin Dexter based his eighth Inspector Morse novel, The Wench Is Dead on the case. In 1923, George Stagg was convicted of the murder by shooting of Aston Villa footballer Tommy Ball. His death sentence was commuted, and he died in 1966 in a mental hospital in Birmingham. In 1970, Raymond Leslie Morris was convicted of the Cannock Chase murders in the Shire Hall and, in 1979, the spree killer, Barry Williams, was convicted of manslaughter on the grounds of diminished responsibility there.

== Shire Hall Gallery ==
The Shire Hall continued to be used as a criminal court until the Stafford Combined Court Centre in Victoria Square opened in 1991. Staffordshire County Council decided to renovate and adapt it, completing the work in 1993 with some funding by English Heritage. The Great Hall became an art gallery, featuring visiting exhibitions and temporary displays of material from the Staffordshire County Museum collection, and occasionally part of the Staffordshire Hoard. The former courtyard was glazed over and is now part of a suite of council offices, including the former Grand Jury Room which retains part of its 18th-century dado. The gallery closed in July 2017. The building continues to be used for one-off events and various options for future use have been submitted to the county council for consideration.

== See also ==
- Grade II* listed buildings in Stafford (borough)
- Listed buildings in Stafford (Central Area)
