= The Black Cap =

Pub in Camden, London

Coordinates: 51°32′18.3″N 0°8′32.85″W

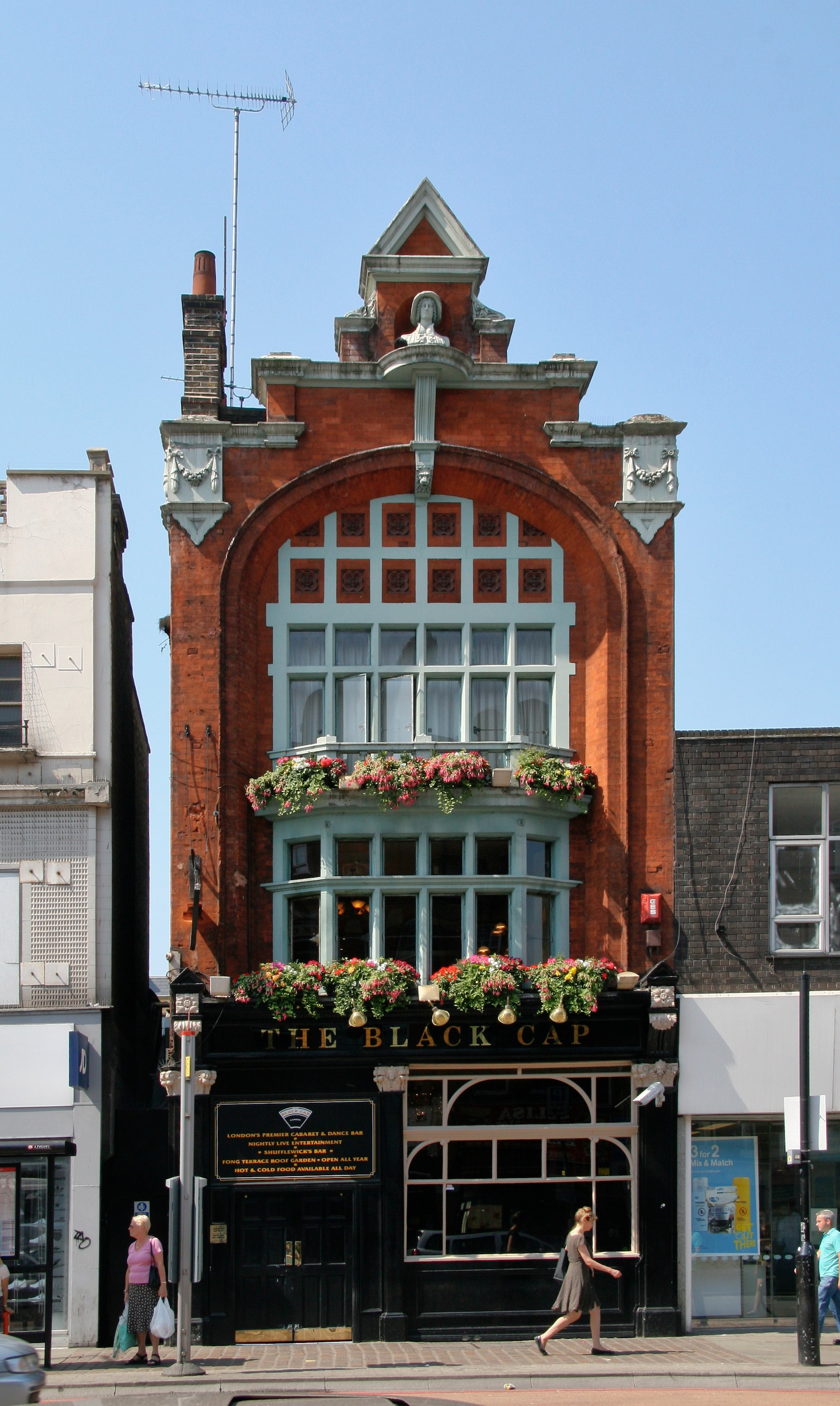
- The entrance to The Black Cap
- Interactive map of The Black Cap

Restaurant information
- Established: In or before 1751
- Location: London, England
- Website: blackcapcamden.co.uk

The Black Cap is a pub in Camden Town, London known for its drag cabaret, and popular from the mid-1960s until it closed in April 2015. In January 2024, reports emerged that first steps had been taken together with the council to reopen The Black Cap at the same site, which had been left vacant since the venue's closure in 2015. The pub reopened in March 2026 after an extensive refurbishment.

== History ==
The pub was initially called the Mother Black Cap after a local legend concerning a witch, and had that name, according to licensing records, as early as 1751. According to census records, the name change occurred between 1839 and 1843. The original pub was located at the site of the current Camden Town underground station, before moving to the latest site by at least 1781, when the original site was turned into a workhouse for the parish of St Pancras. The pub was re-built in 1889, and the first floor performance space was finished in 1952. Its 1889 façade features a bust of Mother Black Cap at its apex.

=== 20th century ===
In the winter of 1965–66 the pub became predominantly known for a homosexual clientele, and in the later 20th century it became known for its drag queen cabaret, and promoted itself as the "Palladium of drag". Drag acts under the 'Baton' of Tony Page, who became the first Resident Compére from 1969 until 1976 and Resident Duo Frankie Rae and David Thallon, Hinge and Bracket started their careers at the pub. Paul O'Grady has stated that his debut as the drag act Lily Savage was on the afternoon of 7 October 1978 at the Black Cap; he wrote that during his act, he mimed the words to Barbra Streisand's "Nobody Makes a Pass at Me" from the show Pins and Needles.

In the 1970s the regular compère at the Black Cap was a drag performer called Shane, who sang and introduced the acts. (There is a film, featuring Shane and others, listed on the BFI website called “Black Cap Drag”.) A regular performer at The Black Cap was Rex Jameson's drag persona, Mrs Shufflewick. A performance was recorded there in 1972. Rex Jameson was a variety artist who hit the big time in the 1950s and 1960s, and went on to attract audiences in the 1970s. The character Mrs Shufflewick was celebrated by artists such as Danny La Rue, Roy Hudd, Bob Monkhouse, Barry Cryer and Barry Humphries. Mrs Shufflewick appeared weekly for Sunday lunch during the 1970s. A Hammond organ played by Frankie Rae and drum kit played by David Thallon took pride of place on a tiny stage upon which Mrs Shufflewick performed two shows, usually with fellow-artiste Marc Fleming. Sunday crowds were large and included Charles Hawtrey, Barry Humphries and Barry Cryer.

Jameson died in 1983 and in memorial, the upstairs bar was called The Shufflewick Bar. Jojo Martin said of Rex Jameson, "Rex Jameson was a genius at his craft, I think the book written about him, ('The Amazing Mrs Shufflewick'), is a very apt title, he was amazing, looking at the photograph on the dust jacket, it is no wonder many thought Rex really was Mrs Shufflewick, rather than a female impersonation act, he should never be forgotten and should always be remembered with the other greats, such as Arthur Lucan (Old Mother Riley) and George Logan and Patrick Fyffe as Hinge and Bracket". The Black Cap was a favourite haunt of the serial killer Dennis Nilsen, who used it to pick up his victims.

During the 1980s, artists such as Reg Bundy who began his Cabaret 'life' as part of the triple Act "The Disapointer Sisters", performed his alter ego Regina Fong on Tuesday nights, attracting a following of "Fongettes". Drag acts such as Lily Savage also appeared at The Cap during the eighties.

The pub in the 1986 film Withnail & I is the "Mother Black Cap" (which stood in Tavistock Crescent). Its name was possibly a combination of The Black Cap, and another Camden pub, The Mother Red Cap.

=== 21st century ===
In more recent times The Black Cap had become home to The Meth Lab, a night of queer cabaret featuring Meth and the Familyyy Fierce. The Meth Lab hosted a number of stars from RuPaul's Drag Race including Season 6's Bianca Del Rio, Adore Delano, and BenDeLaCreme, Season 3 winner Raja Gemini, and Season 7's Trixie Mattel.

In 2013, The Black Cap hosted theatrical events including a Queer interpretation of Macbeth, raising money for the Terrence Higgins Trust.

Owners Faucet Inn closed the pub on 12 April 2015 following controversial plans to redevelop the site.

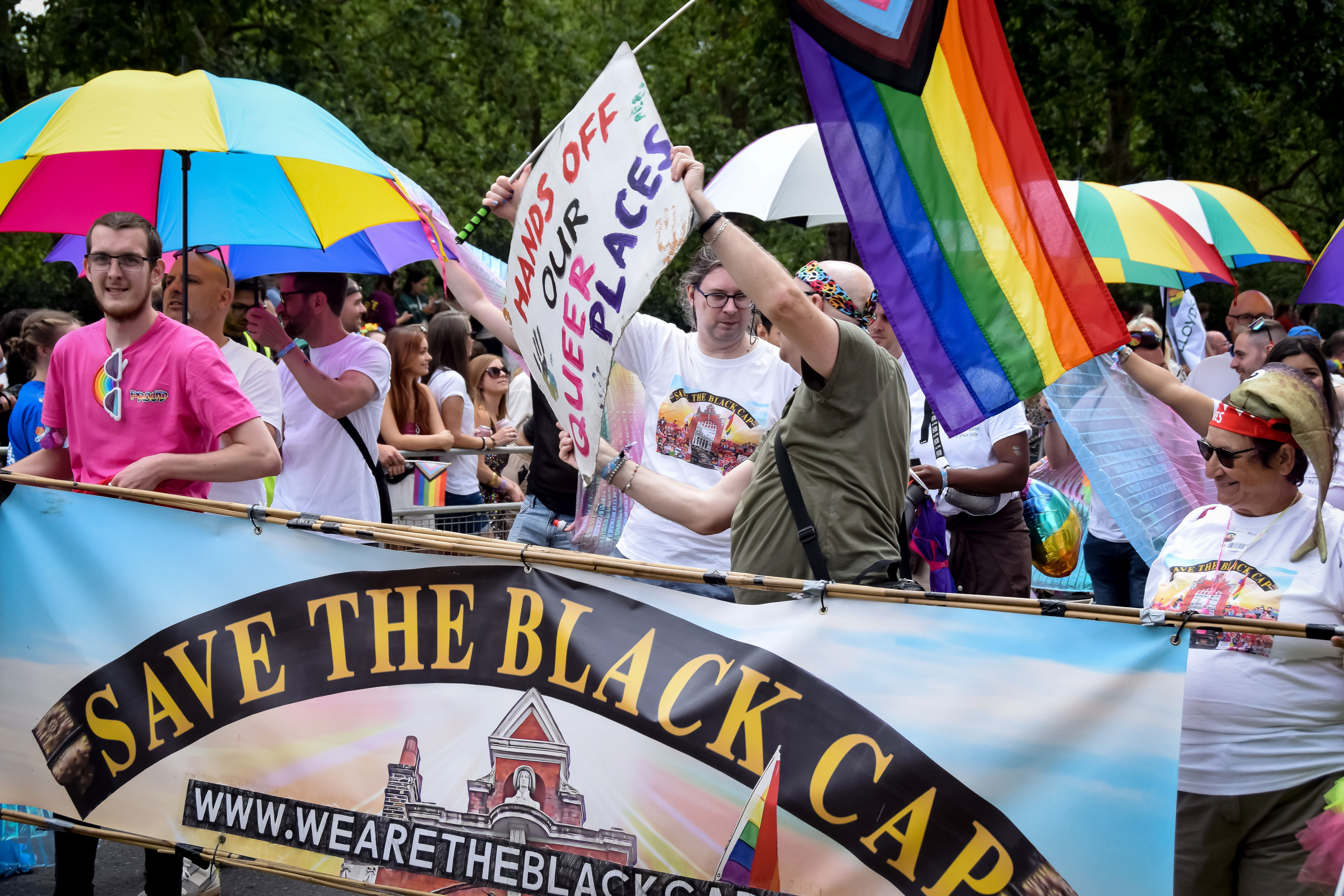
A campaign to "Save the Black Cap" at Pride in London 2023

As of 2019, the pub was in a state of disrepair, exacerbated by squatters who had been residing illegally in the building. However, reports of the pub reopening were confirmed in the summer of 2024 after pressure from local campaign groups and discussions with the Town Hall over use of the building. The pub reopened following an extensive refurbishment on 21 March 2026 after having been closed for 11 years.

== See also ==
- List of LGBTQ bars
