= Trussell =

Trussell is a surname. Notable people with the surname include:

- Edmund Trussell, MP for Northamptonshire in 1330
- John Trussell, MP for Northamptonshire in 1404 and 1414
- John Trussell (1575–1648), English historical writer
- Sumner L. Trussell (1860–1931), judge of the United States Board of Tax Appeals
- Sir William Trussell (died 1346), Speaker of the House of Commons who informed Edward II of Parliament's vote of no confidence in him and became Edward III's Secretary and emissary overseas
- William Trussell (died 1364), son of the above. Receiver of the Chamber in 1333
- William Trussell, MP for Leicestershire in 1421
- William Trussell, MP for Leicestershire in 1472 and 1477

== See also ==
- Acton Trussell, village in the English county of Staffordshire
- Acton Trussell and Bednall, civil parish in Staffordshire, England
- Marston Trussell, village and civil parish in Northamptonshire in England
- The Trussell Trust, co-ordinators of a network of food banks in the UK
