= Jump for Joy (1941 revue) =

1941 revue with music by Duke Ellington

Jump for Joy is a 1941 musical revue by Duke Ellington that opened on July 10, 1941, at the Mayan Theater of Los Angeles, and ran for nine weeks (122 performances).

It included many songs by Ellington, including the jazz standard "I Got It Bad (and That Ain't Good)" and the title track, "Jump for Joy." The cast included Ivy Anderson, Dorothy Dandridge, Marie Bryant, Herb Jeffries, Judy Carol, Artie Brandon, Al Guster, the Hi-Hatters, Lawrence Harris, Suzette Johnson, William Lewis, "Pot, Pan, and Skillet", Otis Renee, Wonderful Smith, Joe Turner, Paul White, and the Duke Ellington Orchestra.

== Reception ==
The musical received rave reviews, and both Orson Welles and Charles Chaplin considered buying the show, but were refused, as the show was collaborative in nature and the writers did not want it to be owned.

Despite the show's success, it never made it to Broadway.

== Political message ==
Unlike other all-African-American revues of the time, it was very outspoken on racial matters, with the songs "Jump for Joy" ("Fare thee well, land of cotton / Cotton lisle is out of style"), "Same Old South" ("It's a regular children's heaven / Where they don't start to work until they're seven" and "I got a Passport from Georgia (And I'm Going to The USA)" ("Goodbye Jim / And I do mean Crow").

The production team received protests and death threats. Duke Ellington described Jump for Joy later in his life as "the first 'social significance' show".
