= Bednall =

Village in Staffordshire, England

Coordinates: 52.75°N 02.07°W

- Location within Staffordshire
- OS grid reference: SJ9517
- Civil parish: Acton Trussell and Bednall
- Shire county: Staffordshire
- Region: West Midlands
- Country: England
- Sovereign state: United Kingdom
- Post town: Stafford
- Postcode district: ST17
- Police: Staffordshire
- Fire: Staffordshire
- Ambulance: West Midlands
- UK Parliament: Stone, Great Wyrley and Penkridge

Bednall is a village in Staffordshire, England.

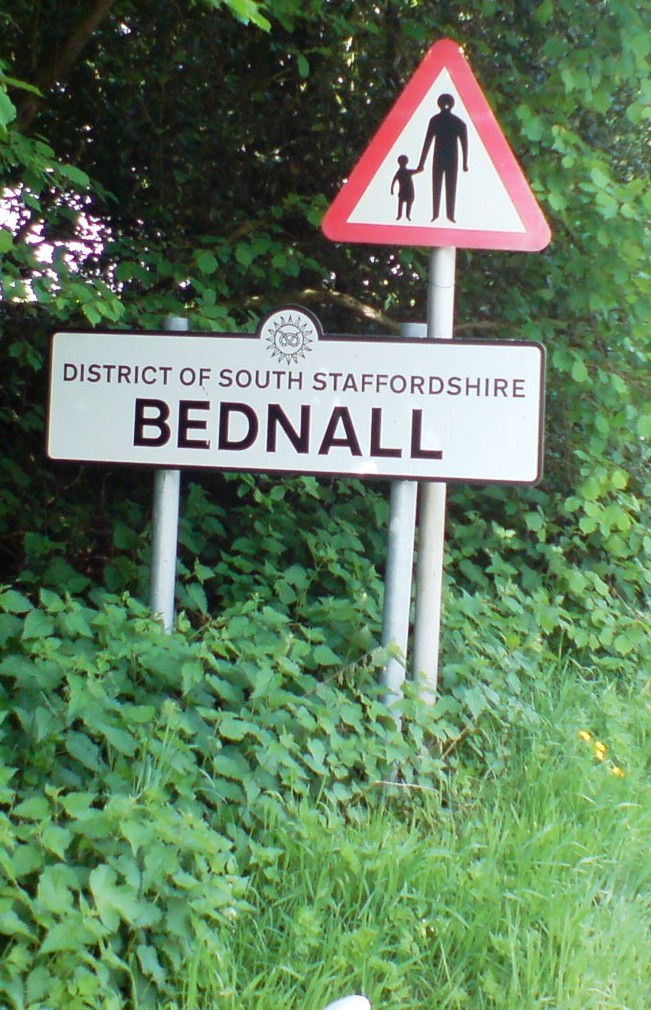
Bednall village sign, May 2008

== Location ==
Bednall lies somewhat remote from main roads, in dairy-farming countryside some 4.5 miles southeast of Stafford, 3 miles east of M6 junction 13, 2 miles east of Acton Trussell, about 3/4 of a mile west of the A34 Cannock to Stafford road and about 1 mile southeast of Brocton, Staffordshire. The area around the A34 road is called Bednall Head.

== The Bednall name ==
The name Bednall is derived from Badenhall, although it did not appear in the modern form until the late 17th century. It derives from Robert de Badenhall who lived in Staffordshire c.1100. He was one of the knights of the Bishop of Chester from whom he held the land known as Badenhall, and from which he derived his name.

The place-name and surname Bednall appears as:

1. Badenhall Staffordshire; Bada's Halh - Bada's nook or remote place or valley. Early forms-Badehal - in the Domesday Book circa 1185, and Badenhale-Book of Fees 1242;

2. Bednall Staffordshire; Beda's Halh- Definition as for Badenhall. Early forms -Bedehala in the Domesday Book 1185, Bedenhale in the Subsidy Rolls of 1327

It also appears in place-names and surnames in Northumberland, Nottinghamshire and Worcestershire.

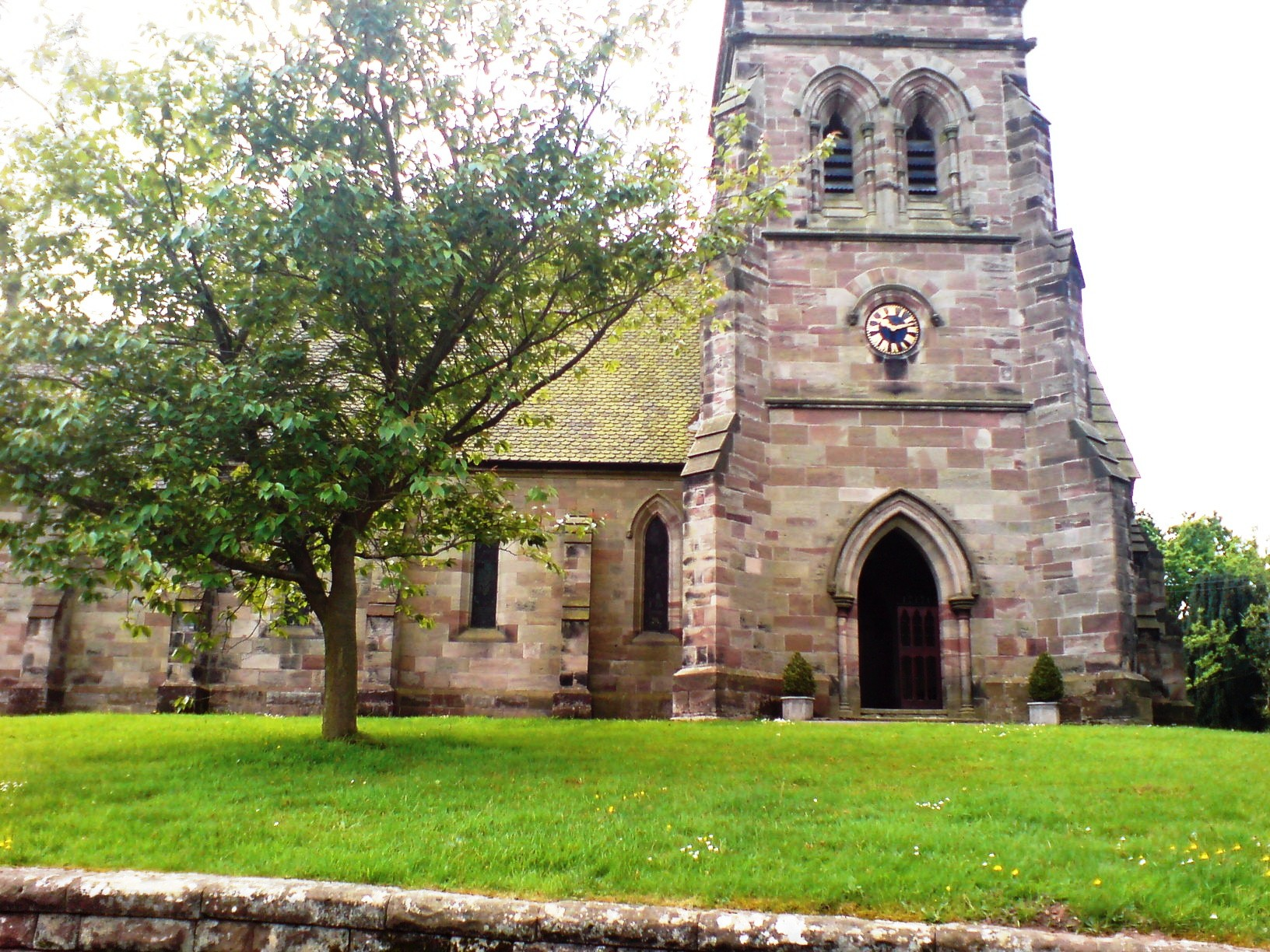
All Saints church, Bednall, May 2008

== All Saints Church ==
A chapel at Bednall dates from the 12th century. The present church of All Saints dates from 1846. The original chapel consisted of a nave and chancel and a wooden bell turret at its west end. Stained glass was added in the east and west windows in 1862 and 1894 respectively. The glass in the north windows and the desk and lectern date from 1915 and electric lighting was installed in 1937.

== See also ==
- Listed buildings in Acton Trussell, Bednall and Teddesley Hay
