= John Golland =

English composer

John Golland (14 September 1942 in Ashton-under-Lyne – 14 April 1993 in Dukinfield) was an English composer. He is most famous for his works for brass band, such as Sounds, Atmospheres, Peace, Rêves d'Enfant, his two euphonium concerti and a flugelhorn concerto. He also composed incidental music for the 1983-84 BBC sitcom Dear Ladies.

== Career ==
Golland was educated at de la Salle College, Salford, and from 1960 he attended teacher training college in Oldham. He also studied part time at the Royal Manchester College of Music, with Thomas Pitfield (composition) and Marjorie Clementi (piano). In 1964 he became a music teacher at St Anselm's School, Oldham.

After joining the Stalybridge Band in the 1960s, Golland learned to play the euphonium and began to compose and arrange for brass band and wind band. From 1970 he became a full-time composer and musical director of various bands, including the Adamson Military Band, Fodens and the W. Harrison Transport Rockingham Band. From 1975 he often conducted and wrote for bands in Switzerland.

== Composition ==
His compositions, dating mostly from the early 1970s onwards, include the Christmas oratorio The Word Made Flesh, op. 24 (1970), a Trumpet Concerto, op. 29, and a Symphony, op. 33 (1972). But it was his brass band compositions that eventually gained the most attention. Sounds, op. 37 (1973), described by Paul Hindmarsh as "an impressive abstract symphonic study for band", took almost two decades to become established as a core test piece for brass bands. Golland revised it substantially before the Black Dyke Mills Band first performed the final version at the BBC Festival of Brass in 1991.

Other pieces for band include Aria (1990), Atmospheres, the Bellna suite (1998-9, evoking the Swiss Alps), the Concerto for Brass Band (1989–90), Peace (1973) and Rêves d'Enfant (1982). There are also a series of concertos: two for euphonium, one for flugelhorn (op. 87, 1991, written for Stan Lippeatt and the Thoresby Colliery DOSCO Band), and an earlier Tuba Concerto, op. 46, which was only discovered after his death in 1993. It was first performed by Andrew Duncan and the Hallé Orchestra in 1997, and subsequently recorded by James Gourlay.

Golland also wrote a children's opera, The Selfish Giant (first performed 1981). In 1983 his work for the BBC on the incidental music for three series of Dear Ladies, featuring the comic characters Hinge and Bracket and based around the musical activities of a village community, brought his music to the attention of a wider audience. He also composed for Granada TV and contributed music to a film, Ardotalia (1971).

== Legacy ==
Golland died after a long illness in April 1993, aged 50. A blue plaque was fixed to Dukinfield Town Hall to commemorate his life. An archive of his manuscripts - over 100, with 88 assigned opus numbers - and papers is held at the Royal Northern College of Music. The archive includes a memoir of Golland by Thomas Pitfield.
