= Faucet (disambiguation) =

A faucet (or "tap" or "spigot") is a valve controlling the release of a liquid or gas.

Faucet may also refer to:

- Bitcoin faucet, a bitcoin dispenser
- Bithynia tentaculata, or faucet snail, a species of freshwater snail

== See also ==
- Faucet Inn, a British pub company
