= Dear Ladies =

1983–1984 British comedy television series

- Genre: Sitcom
- Written by: Gyles Brandreth; Patrick Fyffe; George Logan
- Directed by: Mike Stephens
- Starring: Patrick Fyffe; George Logan
- Composer: John Golland
- Country of origin: United Kingdom
- Original language: English
- No. of series: 3
- No. of episodes: 20

Production
- Producer: Peter Ridsdale Scott
- Running time: 30 minutes
- Production company: BBC

Original release
- Network: BBC Two
- Release: 15 March 1983 – 16 December 1984

Dear Ladies is a British comedy television series that aired on the BBC in 21 episodes between 1983 and 1984. It featured the comic characters Hinge and Bracket, played by George Logan and Patrick Fyffe.

The comedy is set in and around the house the ladies shared in the fictional village of Stackton Tressel in Suffolk and gives viewers "A glimpse behind the scenes of village life in Stackton Tressel."

== Premise ==
Dr Evadne Hinge and Dame Hilda Bracket are a pair of elderly spinsters who live in the fictional English village of Stackton Tressel. They share a large house named Utopia Ltd, owned by Dame Hilda, the east wing of which is occupied by Evadne. Each episode is based around their musical activities at home and in the village community.

== Production ==
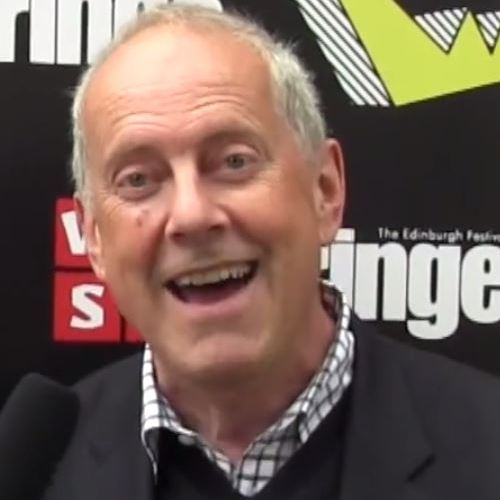
Dear Ladies was co-written with Gyles Brandreth

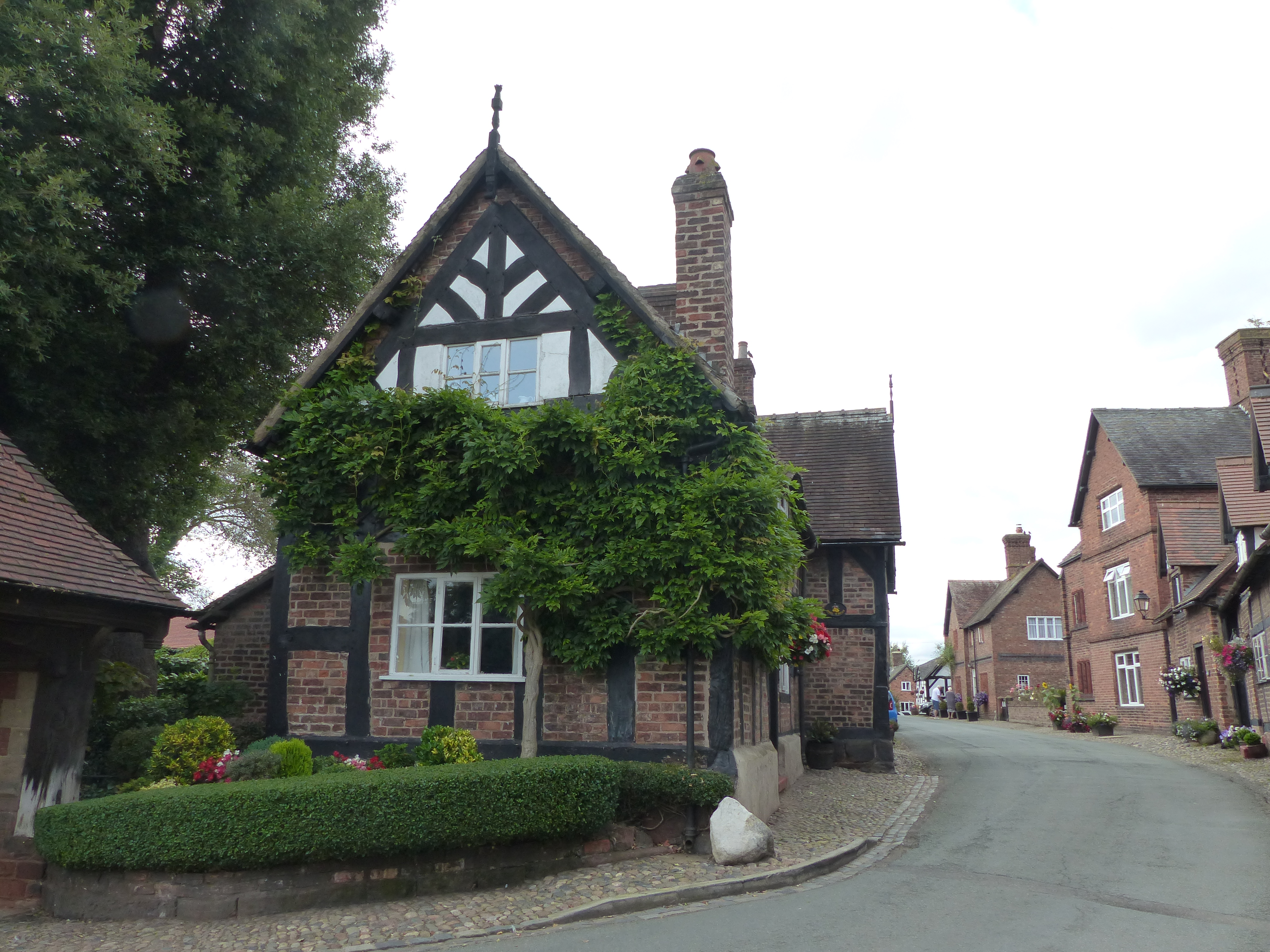
Locations such as Great Budworth evoked the genteel world of Stackton Tressel for Dear Ladies

Hinge and Bracket were conceived by George Logan and Patrick Fyffe as a pair of old ladies who had spent their lives performing classical music. Their comic female impersonation act had grown in popularity in the 1970s, and after appearing on BBC Radio, a Hinge and Bracket situation comedy was developed. The scripts were written by George Logan and Patrick Fyffe, who played the starring roles, in collaboration with the writer and broadcaster Gyles Brandreth. Brandreth described Hinge and Bracket as "a drag act with a difference. They offered character and comedy instead of glamour and sex appeal."

Exterior scenes were filmed on location in the Cheshire towns of Knutsford, Great Budworth and Nantwich.

Incidental music is by John Golland. A special episode was broadcast after the 1984 series, the "Dear Ladies Masterclass", in which Hinge and Bracket are invited to deliver a music masterclass at the Royal Northern College of Music in Manchester. The episode features students of the college, who perform under the tutelage of the two Ladies.

== Cast ==
Dear Ladies cast members included:

- George Logan as Dr Evadne Hinge
- Patrick Fyffe as Dame Hilda Bracket
- Richard Aylen as Courtney Pines
- Geoffrey Banks as Rev. Donald Smollit
- Frances Cox as Miss Grace Pullet (Librarian)
- Terry Gilligan as various roles
- Hope Johnstone as Party Organiser
- Madeleine Newbury as Joan Shanks
- Paula Tilbrook as Party Organiser
- Rosalie Williams as Dodie Bantock

== Episode list ==
=== Series 1 ===
No.	Title	Original release date
1	"Look After The Pennies"	15 March 1983
2	"Sale Or Return"	22 March 1983
3	"Bowled Over"	29 March 1983
4	"Alarms & Excursions"	5 April 1983
5	"Doctor's Orders"	12 April 1983
6	"Don't Ring Us"	19 April 1983

=== Series 2 ===
No.	Title	Original release date
1	"The Time Of Our Lives"	16 February 1984
2	"Song & Dance"	23 February 1984
3	"In Sickness & In Health"	1 March 1984
4	"Gala Girls"	8 March 1984
5	"A Fete Worse Than..."	15 March 1984
6	"Mystery Weekend"	22 March 1984

=== Series 3 ===
No.	Title	Original release date
1	"Be Prepared"	26 September 1984
2	"Where There's A Will"	3 October 1984
3	"Midsummer Madness"	10 October 1984
4	"The Gypsy In My Sole"	17 October 1984
5	"Match Of The Day"	31 October 1984
6	"The Agony & The Ecstasy"	7 November 1984
7	"Friends & Neighbours"	9 December 1984
8	"Oh! Mr Mayor"	16 December 1984
