= George Logan (performer) =

Scottish female impersonator (1944–2023)

- Born: 7 July 1944; Rutherglen, Scotland
- Died: 21 May 2023 (aged 78); Le Dorat, Limousin, France
- Education: Royal Scottish Academy of Music; University of Glasgow
- Years active: 1972–2002
- Known for: Playing Dr Evadne Hinge in the comedy act Hinge and Bracket
- Television: Dear Ladies
- Spouse: Louie Perone (m. 2019)

George Logan (7 July 1944 – 21 May 2023) was a female impersonator, born in Rutherglen, Scotland. he studied piano at the Royal Scottish Academy of Music. He moved to London in 1965 where he began his drag performance career at a gay pub in Marylebone.

Logan was best known for playing the character of Dr Evadne Hinge, one half of the drag comedy double act Hinge and Bracket, alongside Patrick Fyffe as Dame Hilda Bracket. The pair worked together for a number of years until Fyffe's death in 2002.

== Early life ==
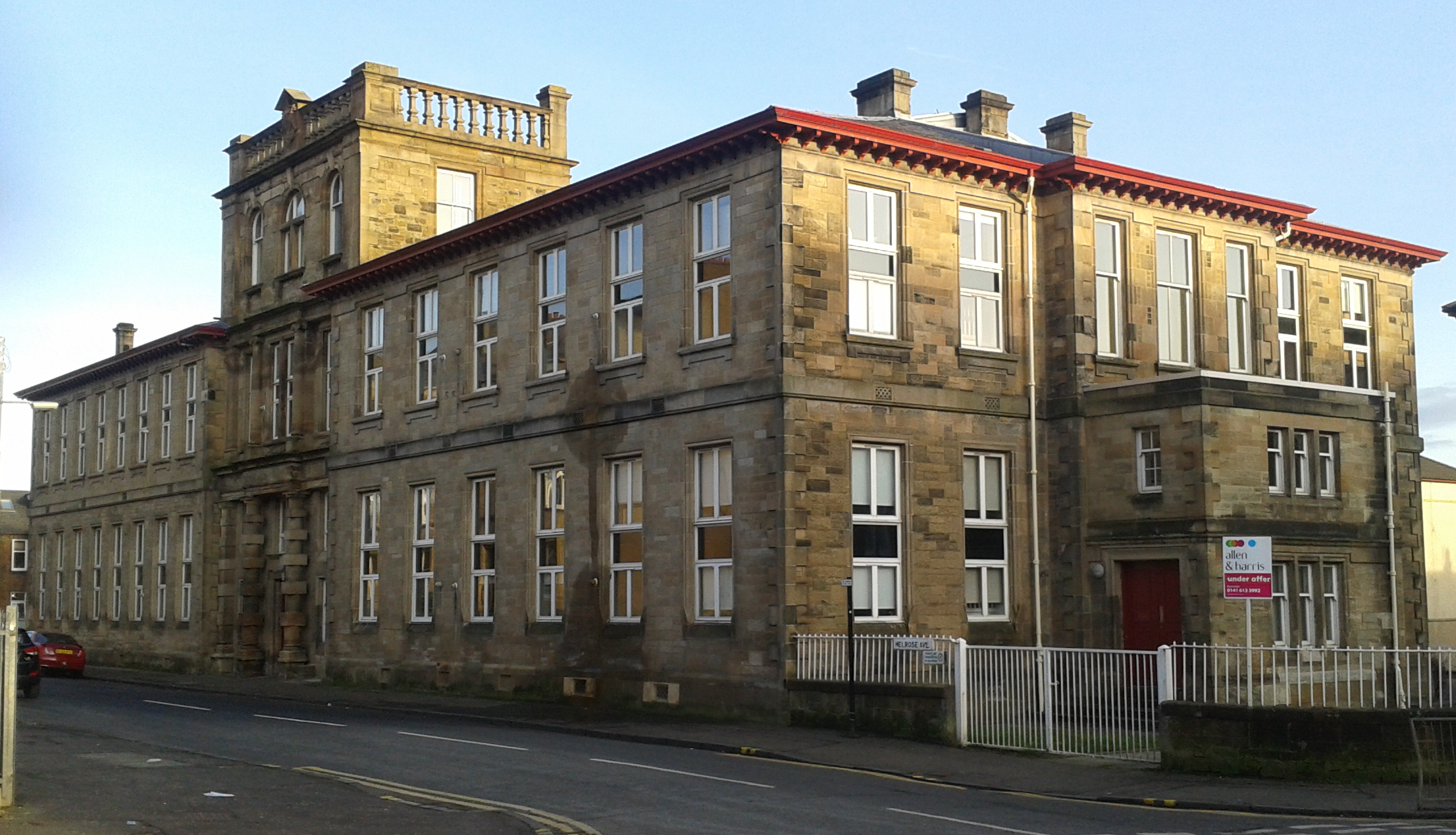
Logan was educated at Rutherglen Academy in the 1950s

George Logan was born in Rutherglen, a small coal-mining town in South Lanarkshire. He was the eldest child of Sarah (née Rae) and George Logan. His father was employed in car manufacturing. The family shared musical interests, and George took piano lessons as a child. As a teenager, George received piano training at the Royal Scottish Academy of Music. George was educated at Rutherglen Academy and then went on to study music and English at the University of Glasgow.

During his adolescence, Logan became increasingly aware of his own homosexuality and of his unease as a flamboyant personality in a small industrial town. Logan described his sense of alienation in a 2016 interview with Gay News, and recalled that reading about the experiences Oscar Wilde and Peter Wildeblood caused him great concern as a teenager (homosexuality was still illegal in Scotland at the time). Logan discovered a sense of liberation after a chance late-night encounter at a bus stop with a group of gay men — "obvious queens, all camp and outrageous" — who took him to a gay bar. His new group of friends gave him a camp name of Audrey Auburn, on account of the colour of his hair. His discovery of the gay scene allowed Logan to explore a new life; "All the burdens I’d felt, this great pressure to go out with a girl to fit the mould, had gone," Logan later recalled. "It was like God had given me a huge gift, that there was a way through life for me that I had never anticipated."

At the age of 19 he began cohabiting with a boyfriend. When the couple were arrested for minor theft, Logan's father bailed them out. A police officer expressed concern that the young Logan was sharing a bedsit and a bed with a 28-year-old man. Logan's father replied, "Well that’s the way it is."

== Career ==
In 1965, Logan moved to London where he began work as a computer programmer. In his leisure time, he often visited a gay pub in Marylebone. One evening, the bar pianist failed to show up, and Logan was asked to fill in to accompany the drag act. He began to play there regularly, and soon conceived his own solo drag-and-piano act. Logan became acquainted with fellow performer Patrick Fyffe in 1970. They had both been performing at the Escort Club in Pimlico, London. At the time, Fyffe was performing his cabaret drag act as a glamorous soprano named Perri St Claire.

Fyffe and Logan began to work together on a new comedy act. The original idea was that Fyffe would play a retired opera singer who still thinks she can sing, with Logan as her male accompanist, still dressed in men's clothes. As they adapted their act, they decided that it would work better if they both appeared as eccentric old ladies. The idea developed into a dual-drag act, Hinge and Bracket, with Logan and Fyffe playing genteel, elderly ladies performing songs by Gilbert and Sullivan, Noël Coward and Ivor Novello ("Dear Ivor") and reminiscing about past glories on the concert hall stage.

In his role as Dr Evadne Hinge, George Logan played the piano accompaniment to Dame Hilda Bracket's operatic solos. The pair also sang duets together. Much of the comedy rested on the constant bickering between the two characters; Evadne played the "straight woman", providing the voice of reason and frequently sardonic retorts to Dame Hilda's extrovert performance. They developed plausible back stories for the characters, living in the fictional English country village of Stackton Tressel. In an interview in 2008 with the Gay men's magazine Bent, Logan explained that he and Fyffe based the Hinge and Bracket characters on English character types such as Joyce Grenfell and Margaret Rutherford.

After playing in numerous London gay pubs and clubs in the early 1970s, including the Royal Vauxhall Tavern, their double act rose to prominence when their show, An Evening with Hinge and Bracket, played at the Edinburgh Festival Fringe in 1974. Logan and Fyffe subsequently went on tour, taking their show to London theatres such as the Royal Court and the May Fair and the Ambassadors. Their success on stage led to the commissioning of several BBC Radio series, including The Random Jottings of Hinge and Bracket. They also collaborated with Gyles Brandreth on the script for their BBC Television programme, Dear Ladies (1983–1984).

The Hinge and Bracket act was distinct from drag queens in that their portrayal was more realistic, appearing on stage resplendent in cocktail dresses and lisle stockings, and this enabled them to gain more mainstream appeal beyond gay clubs. Many people at the time did not realise that Hinge and Bracket were a drag act and believed them to be two elderly ladies. Gyles Brandreth later recounted that, at a charity gala appearance at the Oxford Playhouse, co-stars Dame Peggy Ashcroft and Dame Flora Robson believed Hinge and Bracket to be two elderly lesbians.

The Hinge and Bracket act faltered briefly after Logan became the subject of a tabloid newspaper scandal when the News of the World ran a story about Logan's "sordid secret life of gay sex and drugs", but the act began again in the early 1990s. After the death of Patrick Fyffe in 2002, Logan retired the character of Dr Hinge, but briefly returned her to the stage for the comic opera The Dowager's Oyster in 2016.

In 2019 George appeared as himself on the Whitley Cock album "Chuffy". A combination of electronic pop and spoken word, "Chuffy" featured George in the role of Narrator. George's vocal contribution was recorded in his Le Dorat residence in early 2019 and the album was released via Stargazing Clear Skies Records later that year, as well as being made available via Bandcamp.

== Personal life ==
Logan was in a relationship for many years with Louie Perone. Following the legalisation of same-sex marriage, the couple married in 2019. Logan and Perone settled in France, where they ran a guest house near Le Dorat in Limousin (now Nouvelle-Aquitaine).

== Death ==
Logan died on 21 May 2023. He was survived by his husband Louie and his sister Jennifer.

His funeral took place on 25 May 2023 at the Collegiate church of Le Dorat, and Logan was cremated at Landouge du Dorat Crematorium.

== Bibliography ==
Logan wrote a humorous book entitled The Naked Doctor (2014), supposedly written as an autobiographical account by Dr Evadne Hinge of her life and stage career. In 2015, Logan's own personal memoirs were published, A Boy Called Audrey. These were later (in 2019 and 2020) expanded into a three volume set of books with the over-arching title "All About Audrey" (individual volumes were entitled "I, Audrey", "Turn Again, Audrey" and "What Audrey Did Next", with a fourth volume called "Forever Audrey" planned for publication in 2021.

- Hinge, Dr Evadne ("as told to George Logan") (2014). The Naked Doctor. GJB Publishing. ISBN 978-0-9576242-9-0.
- Logan, George (26 September 2015). A Boy Called Audrey. CreateSpace Independent Publishing Platform. ISBN 978-1-5175-3573-5.
