= Listed buildings in Acton Trussell, Bednall and Teddesley Hay =

Acton Trussell, Bednall and Teddesley Hay form Acton Trussell and Bednall civil parish in the district of South Staffordshire, Staffordshire, England. It contains 33 listed buildings that are recorded in the National Heritage List for England. Of these, two are at Grade II*, the middle of the three grades, and the others are at Grade II, the lowest grade. The parish contains the villages of Acton Trussell, Bednall, and Teddesley Hay, and the surrounding countryside. In the parish was Teddesley Hall, a country house, since demolished, and some of the listed buildings are associated with it. The other listed buildings include two churches, memorials in the churchyards, houses and cottages, farmhouses and farm buildings, two road bridges, two bridges over the Staffordshire and Worcestershire Canal which runs through the parish, and a telephone kiosk.

== Key ==
Grade	Criteria
II*	Particularly important buildings of more than special interest
II	Buildings of national importance and special interest

== Buildings ==
Name and location	Photograph	Date	Notes	Grade
St James' Church, Acton Trussell; 52.75470°N 2.09434°W		c. 1300	The church was altered and extended in 1562 and at other times, and was restored in 1869 by G. E. Street. It is built in stone with a tile roof, and consists of a nave and a chancel in one unit, a south porch, a northeast vestry and a west tower. The tower has diagonal buttresses, an embattled parapet with corner pinnacles, and a short recessed spire. Most of the church is in Decorated style.	II*
Moat House, Acton Trussell; 52.75659°N 2.09680°W		Early 16th century (probable)	A farmhouse on a moated site that was extended in the 18th century and later converted for other uses. It has a timber framed core, with replacement in brick and applied timber framing, and the roof is tiled. There is a T-shaped plan, the front range dating from the 16th century, and the rear wing from the 18th century. The front range is gabled with two storeys and an attic, there is a massive chimney stack to the south, and the ground floor is rendered. The wing has two storeys, a storey band, four bays, and a doorway with reeded pilasters. The windows in both parts are casements, those in the wing with segmental heads. The moated site on which the house stands is a Scheduled Monument.	II
The Old School House, Acton Trussell; 52.75808°N 2.09487°W		Late 16th century	The house was altered later, including a remodelling in the 19th century. It is timber framed with some refacing and rebuilding in brick, and it has a tile roof. There are two storeys, and a T-shaped plan, with a hall range and a gabled cross-wing. The southwest front has a gabled bay flanked by brick half-bays, and it contains a central doorway. The windows in both parts are casements.	II
Brookhouse and barn, Acton Trussell; 52.76568°N 2.09110°W	—	17th century	A farmhouse and attached barn, the farmhouse has a timber framed core, and the buildings are in red brick with tile roofs. The house to the right has two storeys, one bay, and a lower single-bay extension to the right with one storey and an attic. On the front is a gabled porch, and the windows are casements. There is exposed timber framing in the right gable end. The barn to the left has one storey, three bays, and it contains a sliding door, and a doorway and a window with segmental heads.	II
Oldcroft, Acton Trussell; 52.76335°N 2.09534°W	—	17th century (probable)	The house was extended in the 18th century and altered in the 19th century. The original timber framing has been replaced in brick, and the roof is thatched. There is one storey and an attic, and four bays. The central doorway has a thatched roof, the windows are casements with segmental heads, and the roof sweeps over two dormers.	II
Memorial south of nave, Acton Trussell; 52.75462°N 2.09437°W	—	c. 1700	The memorial is in the churchyard of St James' Church, and is a chest tomb in stone with a rectangular plan. The tomb has carved shields on the ends and sides, and an oversailing top with a moulded under-edge.	II
Coppice Farmhouse; 52.73622°N 2.05209°W	—	Early 18th century	A red brick farmhouse that has floor bands and a tile roof with coped verges. There are two storeys and an attic, and four bays. On the front is a Tuscan porch, and the windows are sashes.	II
Barn and cowhouse, Lower Farm, Bednall; 52.75917°N 2.07008°W	—	Early 18th century	The barn and cowhouse are timber framed with brick infill, and have a slate roof. There is one storey and four bays. The building contains doorways, including barn doors.	II
Acton Mill Bridge; 52.76814°N 2.10290°W		18th century	The bridge carries Mill Lane over the River Penk. It is in stone and consists of three semicircular arches. There are two cutwaters rising to flat buttresses, a parapet band, a flat parapet, and end piers with a rectangular section.	II
Acton Trussell Bridge; 52.76838°N 2.10351°W	—	18th century	The bridge carries Mill Lane over a former mill stream. It is in rusticated stone and consists of a single segmental arch. The bridge springs from behind semicircular buttresses with rounded caps, and has a parapet band, and a plain coped parapet with the ends sweeping forward.	II
Aspley family memorial, Acton Trussell; 52.75481°N 2.09453°W	—	18th century	The memorial is in the churchyard of St James' Church, and is to the memory of members of the Aspley family. It is a chest tomb in stone, with a rectangular plan. The tomb has a moulded base, reeded corner pilasters, circular panels to the sides, and a moulded edge to the top.	II
Ice house, Teddesley Hall; 52.74027°N 2.07899°W	—	18th century	The ice house in the grounds of the hall has a red brick entrance that leads to the conical interior, over which is a mound of earth.	II
Hay barn, Teddesley Home Farm; 52.74237°N 2.07327°W	—	1781	The barn is in red brick with a tile roof, and has an L-shaped plan, consisting of a main range and a wing. The main range has one storey and nine bays, and contains segmental-headed openings, including a carriageway, and four tiers of ventilation loops. The wing has two storeys, and contains segmental-headed arches, and a wide central carriageway, above which is a clock surmounted by a bell.	II
Acton Mill Farmhouse; 52.76692°N 2.10340°W	—	Late 18th century	The farmhouse is in red brick and has a tile roof. There are five storeys, an L-shaped plan, with a front range of three bays, and a rear wing. The central doorway has a semicircular fanlight and a pediment, and the windows are casements with segmental heads.	II
Bridge No. 89 (Teddesley Park Bridge); 52.73657°N 2.09519°W		Late 18th century	The bridge carries a bridleway over the Staffordshire and Worcestershire Canal. It is in red brick, and consists of a single three-centred arch. The bridge has a moulded parapet string course, a partly balustraded parapet with some brick infill, it ends in octagonal piers, and the abutments continue for about 15 yards (14 m).	II
Bridge No. 92 (Acton Moat Bridge); 52.75720°N 2.09747°W		Late 18th century	The bridge carries a bridleway over the Staffordshire and Worcestershire Canal. It is in red brick, and consists of a single segmental arch. The bridge has a dripstone, and a plain coped parapet ending in piers with a square section.	II
Harding memorial, Acton Trussell; 52.75459°N 2.09443°W	—	Late 18th century	The memorial is in the churchyard of St James' Church, and is to the memory of members of the Harding family. It is a chest tomb in stone, with a rectangular plan and a bowed west end. On the sides are square panels with quadrant corners, and there are corner pilasters with gadrooned bases.	II
Former stable block, Teddesley Hall; 52.73995°N 2.07911°W		Late 18th century	The former stable block is in red brick on a stone plinth with stone dressings and a hipped tile roof. It consists of four ranges round a courtyard, with entrances on the northeast and southeast sides. There are two storeys, and fronts of seven bays. The middle three bays of the northwest and southwest fronts project under pediments, and in the centre of the southeast front is a semicircular carriage arch with pilasters and a raised keystone. The windows are a mix of sashes and casements.	II
Former service block, Teddesley Hall; 52.73937°N 2.07855°W		Late 18th century	The former service block is in red brick on a stone plinth with stone dressings and a hipped tile roof. It consists of four ranges round a courtyard, with two storeys, and fronts of seven bays. The middle three bays of the southeast and southwest fronts project under pediments, and in the centre of the northwest front is a semicircular carriage arch with pilasters and a raised keystone. Most of the windows are sashes.	II
Ivy House, Acton Trussell; 52.76289°N 2.09656°W		Late 18th or early 19th century	The house, which was later remodelled, is in red brick with overhanging eaves and a tile roof. There is an L-shaped plan, consisting of a front range with two storeys and an attic and three bays, a rear wing with two storeys and three bays, and a recessed single-storey extension to the left. On the front are two bay windows with hipped roofs, casement windows with segmental heads, and three gabled dormers with bargeboards. The outer bays of the rear wing are gabled with bargeboards, in the centre is a gabled porch, to the right is a bay window, and in the upper floor are two sash windows and one casement window.	II
Memorial south of south aisle, Bednall; 52.75769°N 2.06820°W	—	Late 18th or early 19th century	The memorial is in the churchyard of All Saints Church, and is an altar tomb in stone with a square plan. The tomb has a moulded base, oval side panels, a fluted frieze, and a moulded cornice to a stepped cap with an urn finial.	II
Tavernor family memorial and railings, Bednall; 52.75773°N 2.06825°W	—	Late 18th or early 19th century	The memorial is in the churchyard of All Saints Church, and is to the memory of members of the Tavernor family. It is an altar tomb in stone with a square plan. The tomb has a moulded base, oval side panels, a fluted frieze, and a moulded cornice to a stepped cap with an urn finial. The memorial stands in an enclosure of cast iron railings.	II
John Barlow memorial, Acton Trussell; 52.75464°N 2.09420°W	—	1805	The memorial is in the churchyard of St James' Church, and is to the memory of John Barlow. It is a chest tomb in stone, and has a moulded base, reeded angle pilasters, oval panelled sides, and a pyramidal cap surmounted by the base of a former finial.	II
Barn, cartshed and cowhouse, Acton Mill Farm; 52.76721°N 2.10275°W	—	Early 19th century	The farm buildings are in red brick with dentilled eaves and a tile roof. In the centre is a cowhouse with one storey, flanked by gabled wings with lofts. They contain cartshed entries and windows, and there is a semicircular arch containing a lunette.	II
William Stokes Memorial, Bednall; 52.75791°N 2.06813°W	—	1817	The memorial is in the churchyard of All Saints Church, and is to the memory of William Stokes. It is a chest tomb in stone with a rectangular plan. The tomb has a moulded base, corner pilasters, shaped side panels, and a moulded edge to the cap.	II
Former poultry house and cottages, Teddesley Home Farm; 52.74325°N 2.07331°W		c. 1832	The buildings are in red brick with hipped tile roofs, and consist of two octagonal cottages joined by a sweeping poultry house range. The cottages have a single-storey, and each has a Tudor arched doorway and pointed windows with Gothic glazing bars. The poultry house has a single storey, and contains six round-headed doorways and four casement windows with segmental heads.	II
John Barlow memorial and railings, Acton Trussell; 52.75461°N 2.09448°W	—	1837	The memorial is in the churchyard of St James' Church, and is to the memory of John Barlow. It is a chest tomb in stone with a rectangular plan. The tomb has a moulded base, paired fluted columns framing panelled sides with leaf decoration, and moulded edges to a cambered cap. It is surrounded by wrought iron railings.	II
Building containing mill wheel, Teddesley Home Farm; 52.74261°N 2.07316°W	—	c. 1837	The engine house is in red brick with a Welsh slate roof. There are two storeys, a loft and a basement, and it has a rectangular plan. The building contains windows and doorways, one with a segmental head. Inside is a wheel pit built into the natural sandstone bedrock containing an iron pitch-back water wheel, and pipes with valves and a governor.	II*
Keeper's Lodge, Teddesley Hall; 52.73028°N 2.06475°W		c. 1840	The lodge, which is in Italianate style, is in yellow brick, with rusticated quoins, moulded and bracketed eaves, and an oversailing slate roof. There are two storeys and two bays. The projecting porch has a pediment, and a doorway with a semicircular arch spring from imposts and a raised keystone. The windows are sashes with keystones, those in the ground floor with semicircular heads, and in the upper floor with segmental heads. On both sides are canted bay windows with hipped roofs, and above is a window with a keystone and a pedimented gable.	II
All Saints Church, Bednall; 52.75807°N 2.06825°W		1846	Additions were made to the church in 1873, including the steeple. The church is built in stone with tile roofs, and consists of a nave, a southeast aisle, a chancel, a northeast vestry and a southwest steeple. The steeple has a tower with diagonal buttresses, three stages, a south doorway with a pointed head, a stair turret to the northwest, circular clock faces on each front, and it is surmounted by a spire.	II
Mill barn, Acton Trussell; 52.75776°N 2.09558°W	—	c. 1868	The barn and steam engine house are in red brick with blue brick dressings and a tile roof. The building is mainly in one storey, with a loft to the right, and the gabled steam engine house with a tall chimney stack projects to the right of the centre. The barn contains doorways, windows with pointed segmental heads, and tiers of cruciform air vents.	II
Telephone Kiosk, Acton Trussell; 52.75789°N 2.09506°W		1935	A K6 type telephone kiosk, designed by Giles Gilbert Scott. It is constructed in cast iron with a square plan and a dome. There are three unperforated crowns in the top panels.	II
