= Rex Jameson =

English entertainer (c1924–1983)

- Jameson as Mrs Shufflewick
- Born: Rex Coster; 11 June 1924; London, England
- Died: 5 March 1983 (aged 58); Camden, London
- Other name: Mrs Shufflewick

Comedy career
- Years active: 1940s–1983

Rex Jameson (né Coster; c.11 June 1924 – 5 March 1983) was a British comedian and female impersonator known for his creation and stage persona Mrs Shufflewick. After radio and television success in the 1950s and early 1960s, his career declined sharply because of his alcohol abuse. He returned to a niche celebrity in the 1970s in his drag act at The Black Cap, Camden Town, London.

== Life and career ==
He was born in 1924, to unknown parents presumably in London, and was found abandoned at the entrance to Trinity Hospital, Greenwich. He was adopted by George and Mabel Coster of Southend-on-Sea, where he grew up, and moved with them to Holloway in London in 1938.

He was called up to the Royal Air Force in 1942, and joined Ralph Reader's Gang Show in the Middle East, where he entertained the forces and worked with comedian Tony Hancock. After leaving the armed forces he joined a theatre company in Harrow but was dismissed for drunkenness. To avoid confusion with the entertainer Sam Costa, he changed his name to Rex Jameson – his biographer Jonathan Cecil suggests that he chose the name of a well known brand of whiskey, but in fact, the name 'Jameson' was that of his 'adoptive' mother, Nell Jameson, who cared for him for many years in Southend – and joined the resident revue team at the Windmill Theatre, London, where he performed for eight years and was a personal favourite of owner Vivian Van Damm. He also toured widely, introducing several characters including a vicar and a Cockney charlady, to whom he gave the name Gladys Shufflewick. "Shufflewick" was a cant term for masturbation, although this would not have been widely known to later audiences.

His act was as an archetypal woman in the corner of a pub, outwardly prim but liable to slip into tales of past sexual adventures; "a gin-soaked old tart", according to the writer Richard Anthony Baker. In a 2013 study of British comedy, John Fisher suggests that Jameson's Mrs Shufflewick kept alive the tragi-comic spirit of the music hall star Nellie Wallace. For Fisher, Mrs Shufflewick was:

Terribly refined and yet, in her own words, "broadminded to the point of obscenity", she resided in Wimbledon, "all cut glass and tennis balls". Clutching her handbag and wearing drop-pearl earrings, red gloves, damson velvet coat, a hat fashioned from wax fruit and feathers and the obligatory skimpy fur ("known in the trade as untouched pussy, which is unobtainable in London at the moment"), her slightly baffled appearance distilled [a] shabbily genteel world.

He made his first appearance on BBC radio, as Mrs Shufflewick, in 1950, and soon became popular, appearing regularly on such programmes as Variety Bandbox and Midday Music-Hall. He continued to perform in clubs, using more risqué material than on the radio, and became a mentor to the young Danny La Rue. In the theatre he appeared in variety and summer shows, including summer seasons in Blackpool, and was a popular pantomime dame. He also appeared on television, and in 1955 was one of the first performers to be voted as "TV Personality of the Year". However, he became increasingly addicted to alcohol and gambling, and in 1962 was declared bankrupt.

He was booked less frequently for broadcasts or major theatre dates and never again achieved success on television or radio. He appeared briefly in the 1970 Marty Feldman film Every Home Should Have One, and toured working men's clubs in the north of England, where his bawdy material proved popular, but he also faced hostility for his increasingly overt homosexuality, and his alcoholism meant that he lost some of his previously impeccable timing. From 1972 he had a manager, Patrick Newley, who helped organise a career, initially in West End shows and later at The Black Cap in Camden Town. The pub's regular clientele was gay, but the popularity of Mrs Shufflewick's act there drew many heterosexual fans to join them. Among his fans, among fellow comics, were Barry Cryer and Roy Hudd. In later years, his on-stage and off-stage personas tended to merge, and he was generally known among friends as "Shuff".

Jameson collapsed with a heart attack while walking between gigs, and died in the Royal Free Hospital on 5 March 1983, at the age of 58.

== References and sources ==
=== Sources ===
- Fisher, John (2013). Funny Way to Be a Hero. London: Preface Books. ISBN 978-1-84809-313-3.
