= Acton Trussell and Bednall =

Civil parish in Staffordshire, England

Coordinates: 52.758°N 2.081°W

Acton Trussell and Bednall is a civil parish in the South Staffordshire district of Staffordshire, England. As the name indicates, it contains the two villages Acton Trussell, Bednall. Teddesley Hay is part of the grouped parish council. The population of the civil parish at the 2011 census was 1,248.

== See also ==
- Listed buildings in Acton Trussell, Bednall and Teddesley Hay
