= Faucet Inn =

British pub company

Faucet Inn was a pub company based in Britain, formed in 2001, with about twenty pubs, mostly in London. Their head office was at 88 to 90 George Street, London W1U 8PA. By 2015, they had nineteen pubs in operation.

In May 2015, the leader of the United Kingdom Green Party, Natalie Bennett, led a protest at the headquarters of Faucet Inn, following the closure of the long running gay venue, The Black Cap in Camden Town, north London.

In December 2018 a winding up petition was granted against Faucet Inn Limited by HM Revenue & Customs, and administrators were appointed. The company was dissolved on 5 April 2021.
