= Patrick Fyffe =

English female impersonator (1942–2002)

- Born: 23 January 1942; Acton Trussell, Staffordshire, England
- Died: 11 May 2002 (aged 60); Wellington, Somerset, England
- Burial place: Taunton Deane Crematorium, Taunton, Somerset, England
- Years active: 1972–2002
- Known for: Playing Dame Hilda Bracket in the comedy act Hinge and Bracket

Patrick Fyffe (23 January 1942 – 11 May 2002) was an English female impersonator, best known for playing the character of Dame Hilda Bracket, alongside George Logan as Dr Evadne Hinge as the duo "Hinge and Bracket".

== Early life ==
Fyffe was born Patrick John Nathaniel Fyffe in 1942 in Acton Trussell, Staffordshire. Many of his immediate family had been active in musical theatre; his mother and his aunt were a singing act who billed themselves as the Terry Sisters, and his father performed in variety. Fyffe initially trained as a hairdresser and ran his own salon in Stafford before making a career on the stage. He was a regular star of local amateur productions, but a desire to turn professional took him to London.

== Career ==
Fyffe's early professional appearances included a 1964 production of the musical Robert and Elizabeth, at the Lyric Theatre, (in which his sister played the lead for a period, and he played one of Elizabeth's brothers), and a 1971 production of the same show at the Alhambra Theatre, Glasgow.

With some experience of repertory and a couple of provincial tours behind him, Fyffe invented the cabaret drag act character of glamorous soprano Perri St Claire. Played on stage as a sophisticated young lady with singing talent, the Perri character was sufficiently eye-catching to earn him some television slots, and Fyffe was asked to appear in character in a number of television series of the late 1960 and early 1970s, such as Z-Cars, Special Branch and an episode of Doctor in the House in 1969, when he appeared as a cabaret singer. Fyffe also appeared in the film spin-off Steptoe and Son (1972), as a drag artist who becomes the mistaken object of Steptoe Senior's lust.

In the early 1970s, Patrick Fyffe was performing at the Escort Club in Pimlico, London. His pianist failed to turn up and George Logan was brought in as a stand-in accompanist. Fyffe and Logan formed a friendship and began to work together. Initially, they developed a comedy act featuring Fyffe as a retired opera singer who still thinks she can sing, with Logan as her male accompanist. The idea evolved into a dual drag act featuring the pair acting the parts of two eccentric old ladies, Dame Hilda Bracket (Fyffe) and Dr Evadne Hinge (Logan), appearing as Hinge and Bracket. After initial appearances in gay clubs, they found more mainstream success at the 1974 Edinburgh Festival Fringe, and appeared in several BBC Radio and Television series. They made many stage appearances, including two Royal Variety Performances. A backstory developed for the Hinge and Bracket characters in which they were said to be residing in a fictional village called Stackton Tressel; the name was adapted from Fyffe's birthplace of Acton Trussell.

== Death ==
Fyffe died in 2002 in Wellington, Somerset, from colon cancer. He was outlived by his sister, the actress Jane Fyffe.

== Selected filmography ==
- Steptoe and Son (1972, film) – Arthur
- Dear Ladies (1983–1984, television series) – Dame Hilda Bracket
- Random Jottings of Hinge & Bracket (1982–1989, radio series) – Dame Hilda Bracket
- Grace and Favour (1992–1993, television series) – Museum Curator
