= Hinge and Bracket =

British comedy drag act

- Dr Evadne Hinge (George Logan, left) and Dame Hilda Bracket (Patrick Fyffe, right)
- Notable work: The Random Jottings of Hinge and Bracket — BBC Radio 2 (1982–1989); Dear Ladies — BBC Two (1983–1985)

Comedy career
- Years active: 1972–2002
- Medium: Radio, television, stage
- Genres: Female Impersonators Drag, Classical musical comedy
- Former members: George Logan; Patrick Fyffe
- Website: hingeandbracketofficial.co.uk

Hinge and Bracket was a British comedy and musical act consisting of two characters, Dr Evadne Hinge and Dame Hilda Bracket, devised and played by female impersonators George Logan and Patrick Fyffe. Hinge and Bracket were portrayed as a pair of elderly, intellectual female musicians; in these personae, Logan and Fyffe played and sang songs to comic effect. They rose to fame in the 1970s and made many appearances on television and radio. The two generally performed together but, on rare occasions, appeared separately.

The partnership ended when Patrick Fyffe died of cancer on 11 May 2002, at the age of 60. George Logan died on 21 May 2023, at the age of 78.

== Characters ==
Patrick Fyffe and George Logan devised the Hinge and Bracket act after they met performing at the Escort Club in Pimlico, London. Fyffe had already gained experience performing in his cabaret drag act as a glamorous soprano named Perri St Claire, and his character had appeared in small parts on television shows such as Z Cars and Doctor in the House, as well as the 1972 film version of Steptoe and Son.

Fyffe and Logan began to work on a comedy act featuring Fyffe as a retired opera singer who still thinks she can sing, with Logan as her male accompanist. The idea developed into a dual-drag act featuring a pair of eccentric old ladies. Their act was distinct from drag queens in that their portrayal was a more realistic portrayal, allowing them to gain more mainstream appeal beyond gay clubs. Author Roger Baker considered Hinge and Bracket to be "at the forefront of a new development in drag which was based in the creation of completely convincing characters". The illusion was augmented by the fact that, rather than just playing a drag act, Fyffe and Logan sustained the identities of Hilda and Evadne in real life, always appearing offstage in character for interviews and other appearances. Some fans were convinced by their performance and were unaware that the elderly ladies were being acted by two young men, although their act was frequently decorated with double entendres.

Hinge and Bracket were portrayed as a pair of elderly spinsters who had spent their lives performing classical music. They frequently indulged in reminiscences of their heyday singing in opera and performing with Ivor Novello and Noël Coward. Their characters evoked a genteel English inter-war world and their stage act was frequently interspersed with performances of popular songs (often Novello or Coward) and light opera numbers, especially pieces by Gilbert and Sullivan. Both were singers, and Dr.Evadne Hinge usually provided the accompaniment seated at the piano. Writer Gyles Brandreth described Hinge and Bracket as "a drag act with a difference. They offered character and comedy instead of glamour and sex appeal."

The ladies shared a house (known as The Old Manse or Utopia Ltd) in the fictional village of Stackton Tressel in Suffolk; the name was adapted from Fyffe's Staffordshire birthplace of Acton Trussell. They employed the services of an eccentric housekeeper, Maud, played in the radio series by English character actress Daphne Heard. In the early 90's the ladies put Utopia Ltd up for sale as Dr.Evadne Hinge had decided to move back to her native Scotland, buying herself a small rural croft and Dame Hilda Bracket had decided to move to Somerset to live with her nephew Julian.

== Appearances ==
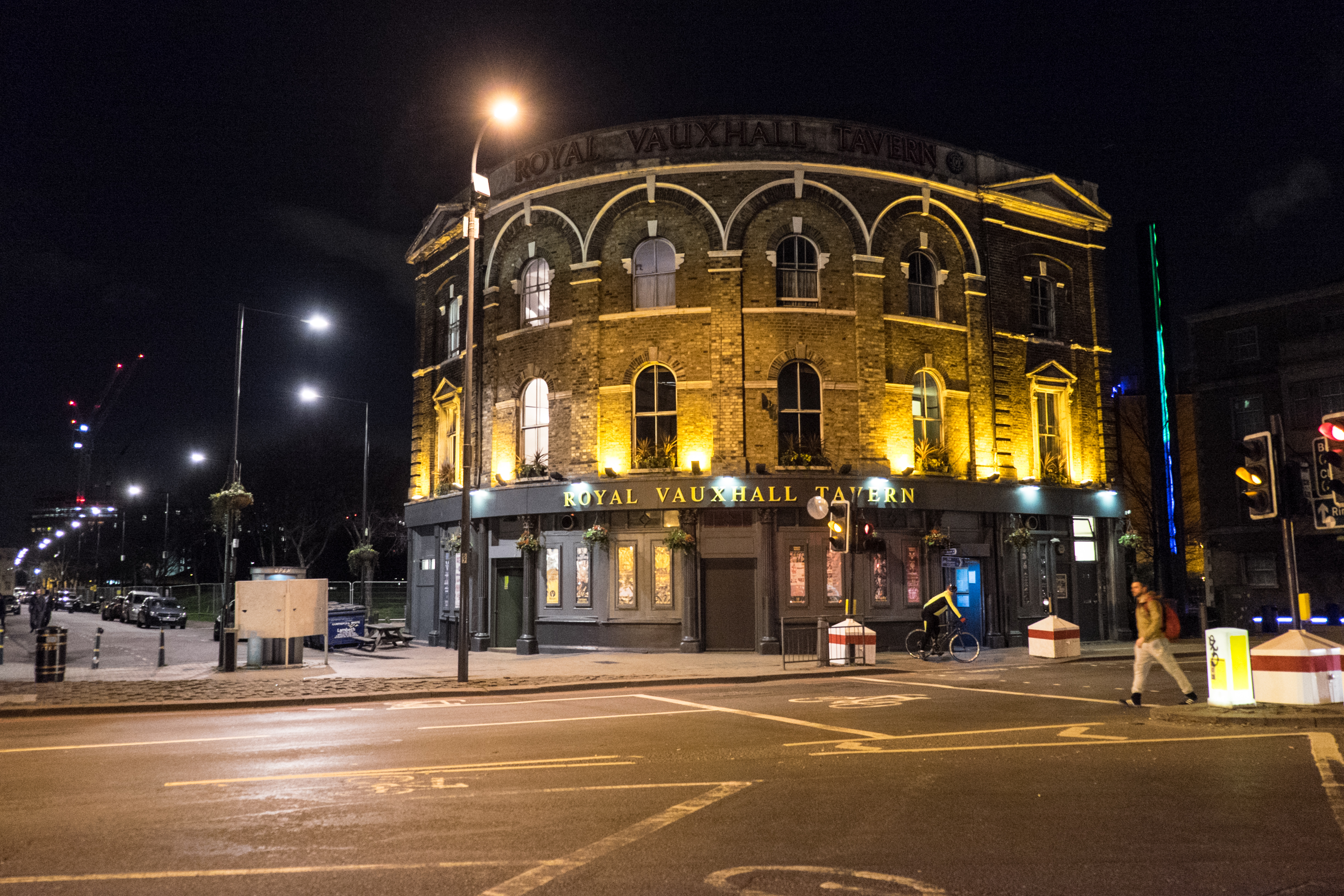
Hinge and Bracket found early success performing at venues like the Royal Vauxhall Tavern in London.

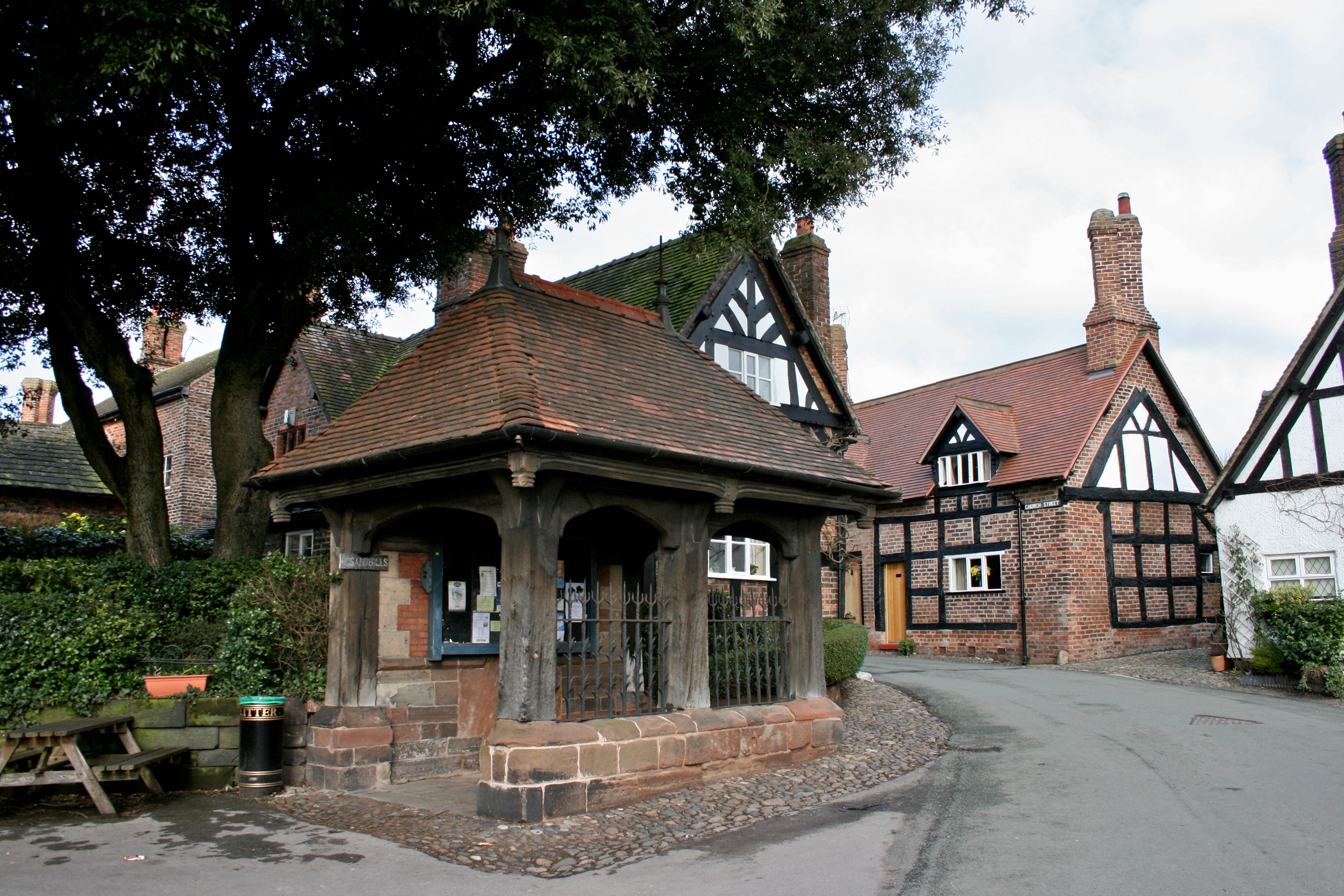
Locations such as Great Budworth evoked the genteel world of Stackton Tressel for their 1980s TV series Dear Ladies.

Hinge and Bracket spent two years in the 1970s performing in London pubs and clubs. This included the Royal Vauxhall Tavern (a popular gay venue), and the Kensington restaurant AD8, owned by Desmond Morgan and April Ashley. After a successful appearance at the 1974 Edinburgh Festival, Hinge and Bracket toured for several years. Among their appearances was a charity gala at the Oxford Playhouse organised by Gyles Brandreth, who later recalled that co-stars of the evening, Dame Peggy Ashcroft and Dame Flora Robson, believed Hinge and Bracket to be two elderly lesbians.

In February 1976, Hinge and Bracket guest starred on the BBC's music hall variety series The Good Old Days. In 1977, they appeared a one-off special At Home with Hinge and Bracket, broadcast on Scottish Television (ITV). That same year, they began their BBC Radio 4 series, The Enchanting World of Hinge and Bracket, which ran until 1979. The show included guest stars such as Roy Barraclough, Michael Bates, Daphne Oxenford, Duggie Brown, Joe Gladwin and Roy Plomley. The duo then appeared in a BBC television show entitled Dear Ladies, co-written by Fyffe and Logan with Gyles Brandreth. Set in the fictional village of Stackton Tressel, it was filmed on location in the Cheshire towns of Knutsford, Great Budworth and Nantwich. Dear Ladies ran on BBC2 from 1983 to 1984. Their radio broadcasts continued with The Random Jottings of Hinge and Bracket, which ran on BBC Radio 2 from 1982 to 1989, and a single radio series in 1990, At Home with Hinge and Bracket, which featured a guest star in each episode to perform with the two ladies, including Rosalind Plowright, Anthony Newley, Jack Brymer, June Whitfield, Benjamin Luxon and Evelyn Laye.

In 1983, Hinge and Bracket appeared in a televised Royal Opera House production of the opera Die Fledermaus. The duo also appeared together in a West End adaptation of Oscar Wilde’s play The Importance of Being Earnest and Peter Shaffer's play Lettice and Lovage, both of which also toured the UK. They made many pantomime appearances, and their act featured on two Royal Variety Shows. Their act was reputedly a favourite of Queen Elizabeth the Queen Mother. In the early 1980s, Hinge and Bracket appeared in a television advertising campaign for Emva Cream Sherry.

Hinge and Bracket released several LP records. In 1980, they released a studio album, Hinge And Bracket at Abbey Road; its title was intended as a parody of the Beatles' 1969 album, Abbey Road. Iain Macmillan, the photographer who took the original photograph for the Beatles album cover art, was engaged to photograph Hinge and Bracket striding across the same zebra crossing on Abbey Road in London.

Logan retired the character of Dr.Evadne Hinge after Fyffe died in 2002, but returned her to the stage for the comic opera The Dowager's Oyster in 2016. Logan died on 21 May 2023, at the age of 78.

=== Radio ===
- The Enchanting World of Hinge and Bracket — BBC Radio 4 (1977–1979)
- The Random Jottings of Hinge and Bracket — BBC Radio 2 (1982–1989)
- At Home With Hinge and Bracket — BBC Radio 4 (1990)

=== Television filmography ===
- At Home with Dr Evadne Hinge and Dame Hilda Bracket (1977)
- Hinge and Bracket — (1978–1981)
- Dear Ladies — BBC Two (1983–1985)

== Discography ==
Albums released of Hinge and Bracket include:

- Hinge & Bracket – Volume 1 — One-Up (1976)
- An Evening with Hinge and Bracket — One-Up (1977)
- Hinge and Bracket in Concert — One-Up (1979)
- Hinge and Bracket at Abbey Road — EMI (1980)
- Hinge and Bracket - Dear Ladies — BBC Records (1983)
- Hinge and Bracket - Live in the Park - Stirred Not Shaken — Funny Business (1995)
- Hinge and Bracket - (Almost) Live at Stockport — Sonorama

== Bibliography ==
- Hinge, Dr Evadne ("as told to George Logan") (2014). The Naked Doctor. GJB Publishing. ISBN 978-0-9576242-9-0.
- Bracket, Dame Hilda (1980). The Memories of Dame Hilda Bracket: One Little Maid. Heinemann. ISBN 978-0434085255.
