= Acton Trussell =

Village in Staffordshire, England

Coordinates: 52.76197°N 2.09696°W

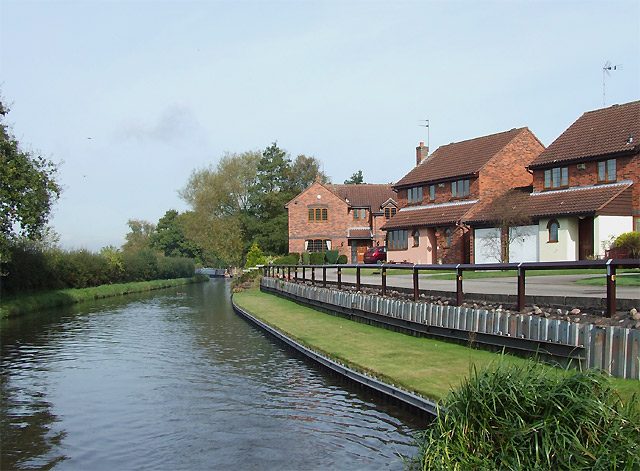
- Staffordshire and Worcestershire Canal through Acton Trussell

- Location within Staffordshire
- Population: 1,248 (2011)
- OS grid reference: SJ935182
- Civil parish: Acton Trussell and Bednall
- District: South Staffordshire
- Shire county: Staffordshire
- Region: West Midlands
- Country: England
- Sovereign state: United Kingdom
- Post town: Stafford
- Postcode district: ST17
- Police: Staffordshire
- Fire: Staffordshire
- Ambulance: West Midlands
- UK Parliament: Stone, Great Wyrley and Penkridge

Acton Trussell is a village in the English county of Staffordshire. It is known as Actone in the Domesday Book. Located around 4 miles southeast of Stafford, it is an affluent village, with many large homes but few local amenities (except for a post office which opens on Tuesdays and Thursdays). Residents in this village have excellent views of Staffordshire farmland and Stafford Castle in the distance. Its close proximity to the M6 motorway (Junction 13) makes it a very convenient location for commuters. The majority of commuting from the village takes place to the areas of southern Staffordshire, eastern Shropshire and the West Midlands conurbation.

In shape a rough parallelogram, this parish is bounded on the west by the River Penk, and to the east it extends to the uncultivated upland of Cannock Chase. On the north lies Baswich, and the southern boundary abuts on the formerly extraparochial area of Teddesley Hay. The ground is very low lying but rises in the north-east at Acton Hill to 375 ft. and in the south-east to 600 ft.

The Staffordshire and Worcestershire Canal runs from south to north through the western edge of the parish. The parish is also crossed by the Cannock road in the north-east on which there was formerly a toll-gate and toll-house, 600 yds. northeast of Acton Hill.

== Etymology ==
The name 'Acton' is derived from the Anglo-Saxon Āctūn meaning oak (āc) + town (tūn); the Trussells were a Norman family who were early lords of the manor.

== St James' Church ==
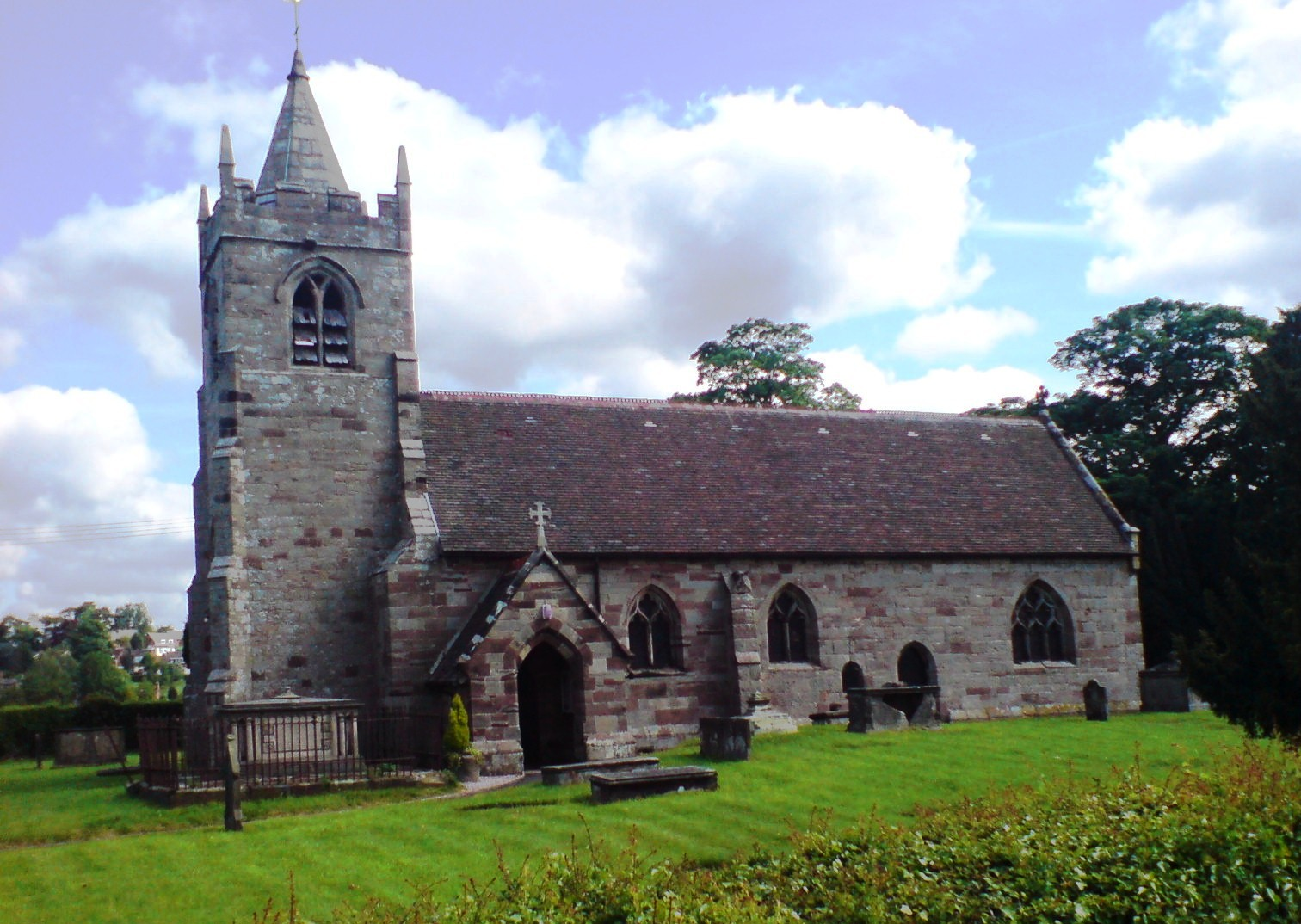
St James' Church, Acton Trussell, May 2008

The village church dedicated to St James was originally built in 1212. It was then enlarged and rebuilt in 1869 under the direction of G E Street, the architect being Andrew Capper. The main additions were a combined vestry and organ chamber on the north side and a new south porch. The church contains a monument to Richard Neville, of Rickerscote, 1728. The church was re-opened after restoration in 1870 having been closed for 44 years.

The churchyard contains war graves of a Durham Light Infantry soldier of World War I and a Royal Engineers soldier of World War II.

== The Moat House ==
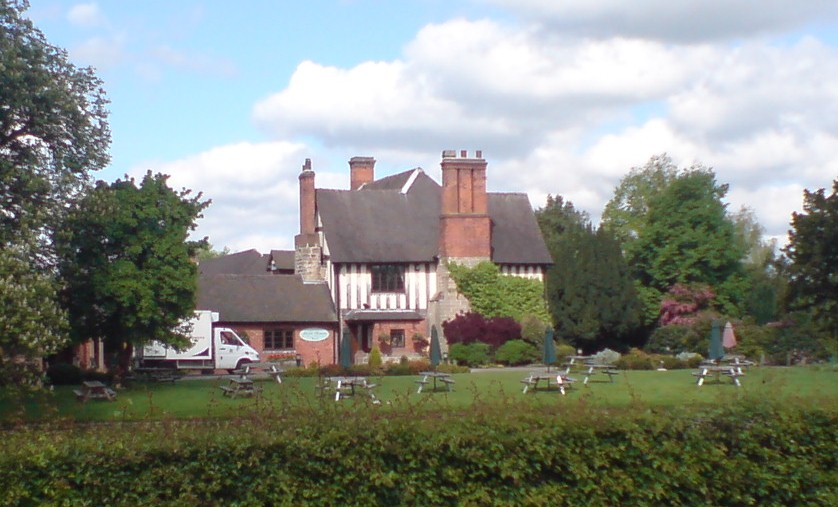
The Moat House, Acton Trussell, May 2008

The village has one very large pub and hotel, The Moat House, not to be confused with The Moat House Group. The Moat House in Acton Trussell is owned independently by the Lewis family. The Lewis family also own two other venues including The Dog and Doublet in the village of Sandon and The Red Lion in the village of Bradley. The pub section of the hotel was the original farm house built on the property.

The oldest part of the present house is on the east side and probably dates from the early 16th century. It consists of a twostory timber-framed wing of four bays. The upper story, originally open to the roof, has had a floor inserted to form attics. The roof has curved windbraces and three original trusses. Two large external chimneys with stone bases and later brick stacks may be contemporary or additions of the early 17th century. Much of the exterior has been faced with brickwork, and there are low brick additions to the south. A brick wing at right angles to the original block was added at the west side c. 1700. This has two stories, attics, and cellars. It may have replaced an early timbered hall. Internally it has a contemporary staircase and panelling. Some earlier panelling may have been removed from the 16th-century wing. The moat, originally large and curved, was probably of early medieval date. The west side was destroyed by the construction of the canal and a depression in the ground indicates the eastern arm. Only part of the north side, fed from the canal, is now wet. The moat was formerly supplied by a small stream from the east which entered the Penk at this point. In 1752 Edward Dickenson was the plaintiff in an action against his neighbour whom he accused of diverting the stream, thus causing his moat, in which he kept fish, to become stagnant

== Roman villa ==
In May 1985 the semi-hexagonal wing of a Roman villa was discovered in the churchyard.

The wing of a Roman villa was discovered in 1985 outside the east boundary of the churchyard; excavations have been ongoing since then, carried out by Penk Valley Archaeological Group. The work has shown that occupation of the site dates back to at least the Neolithic period (late Stone Age), with finds from the Bronze Age and Iron Age proving continuing occupation up to and including the Romano-British period. The wing is a 2nd-century addition to a rectangular building in the churchyard; by the 4th century further additions had been made, and the now old 2nd-century villa, including the wing, was rebuilt.

There are extensive ditched enclosures of the 1st and late 2nd centuries, replaced with a walled enclosure in the 4th century when the villa was extended. The size of the final build stretches from the wing, just outside the east boundary, westward to the tower, and is at least 43 metres. This was proved by a watching brief carried out in 2010 during pipework installation for toilet and tea-making facilities in the church.

== Notable people ==
Acton Trussell was the birthplace of entertainer Patrick Fyffe (1942–2002), one half of the popular comedy duo Hinge and Bracket; the characters resided in a fictional village called Stackton Tressel, a name adapted from Fyffe's birthplace.

== See also ==
- Listed buildings in Acton Trussell, Bednall and Teddesley Hay
