= Cotton lisle =

Type of mercerised cotton

Lisle (from a former spelling of the French city of Lille) or Fil d'Écosse (French for Scottish thread) is a finely-spun, tightly-twisted type of mercerised cotton that is noted for being strong and durable.

Lisle is composed of two strands that have each been twisted an extra twist per inch than ordinary yarns and combined to create a single thread. The yarn is spun so that it is compact and solid. This cotton is used mainly for underwear, stockings, and gloves. Colours applied to this yarn are noted for being more brilliant than colours applied to softer yarn.

This type of thread was first made in the city of Lisle (now spelt Lille), France, hence its name.

== See also ==
- Mercerisation
