= St Thomas Church, Walton-on-the-hill =

Church in Staffordshire, England

Coordinates: 52.7866°N 2.0643°W

St Thomas Church, Walton-on-the-Hill
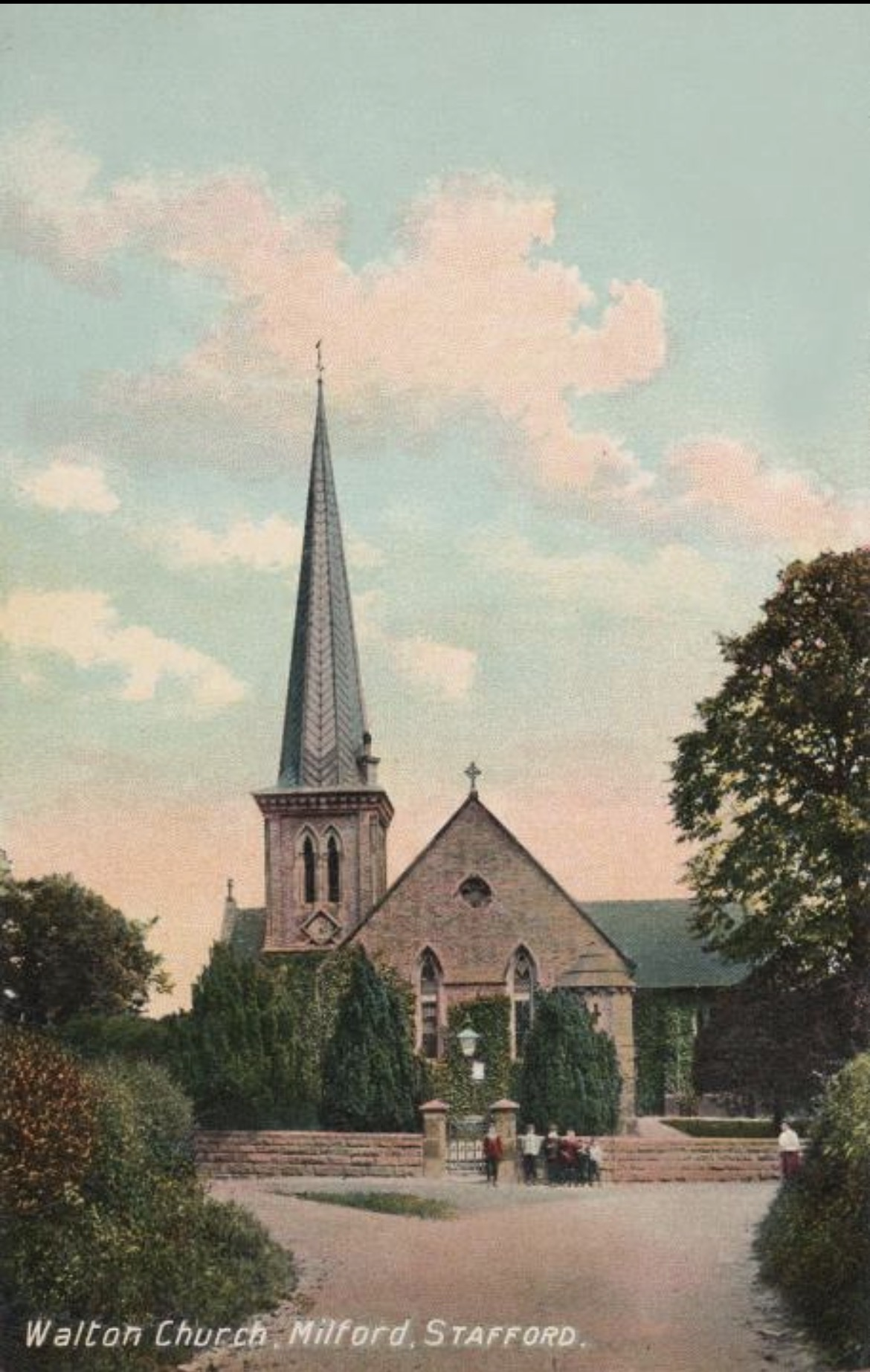
- View of the church from the west
- St Thomas Church, Walton-on-the-Hill
- OS grid reference: SJ 95760 21002
- Location: Walton-on-the-Hill, Staffordshire, England
- Country: England
- Denomination: Church of England
- Website: Parish website

History
- Status: Parish church
- Founded: 1842
- Founder: Earl of Lichfield
- Consecrated: 22 December 1842

Architecture
- Functional status: Active
- Architect: Thomas Trubshaw

Administration
- Diocese: Lichfield
- Parish: Berkswich

St Thomas Church is a Anglican church in the village of Walton-on-the-Hill, Staffordshire, England.

== History ==
The church was built on land donated by the Earl of Lichfield and designed by the architect Thomas Trubshaw. The total cost of construction was approximately £957, and the building was completed and dedicated to St Thomas the Apostle on 22 December 1842 as a chapel of ease for the local community.

Shortly after its completion, the spire was struck by lightning in May 1845, causing damage to the roof and windows. Further repair work was undertaken during the following decades, and in 1903 the structure was declared unsafe. The lead covering of the spire was replaced with a lighter material, and a new weathercock was installed.

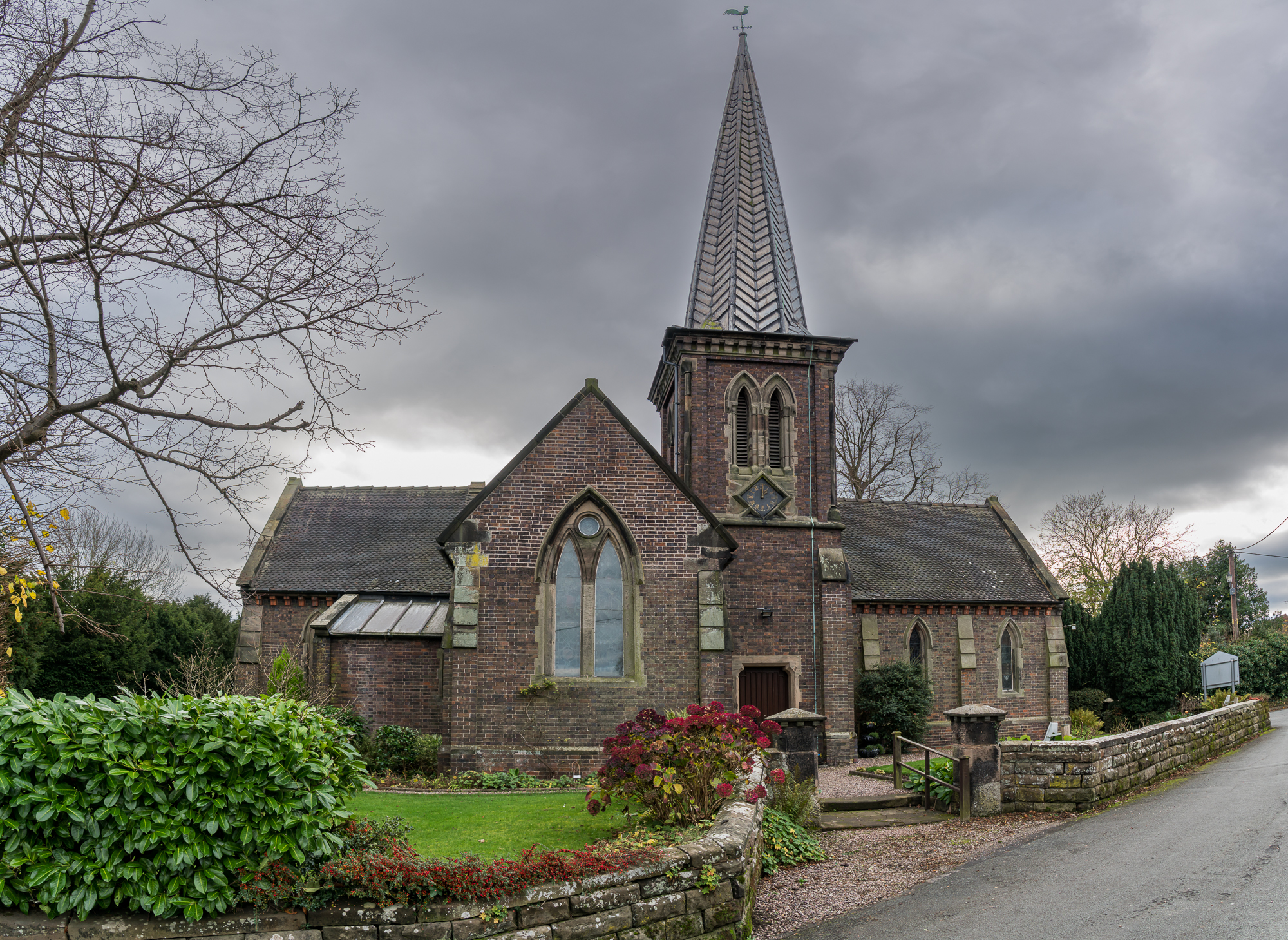

The cost of construction and early maintenance was met in part by the Reverend Richard Levett, his wife, and the banker Thomas Salt. The church maintains historical connections with the Levett family of nearby Milford Hall.

In the present day, St Thomas Church continues to serve the local community as part of the Parish of Berkswich. Its churchyard has received recognition in local competitions for maintenance and environmental standards.
