= Milford, Staffordshire =

Village in Staffordshire, England

Coordinates: 52.78747°N 2.04148°W

Milford
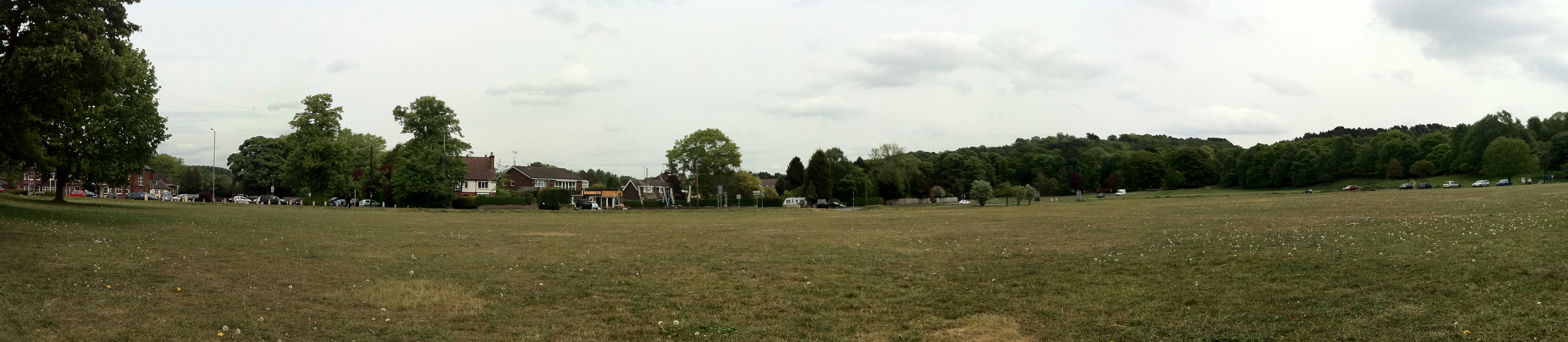
- Milford Common

- Location within Staffordshire
- Civil parish: Berkswich
- District: Stafford
- Shire county: Staffordshire
- Region: West Midlands
- Country: England
- Sovereign state: United Kingdom
- Post town: Stafford
- Postcode district: ST17
- Police: Staffordshire
- Fire: Staffordshire
- Ambulance: West Midlands
- UK Parliament: Stone, Great Wyrley and Penkridge

Milford is a village in the county of Staffordshire, England. It lies at the edge of Cannock Chase, on the A513 road between Stafford and Rugeley. Just to the north of the village is the River Sow.

== History ==
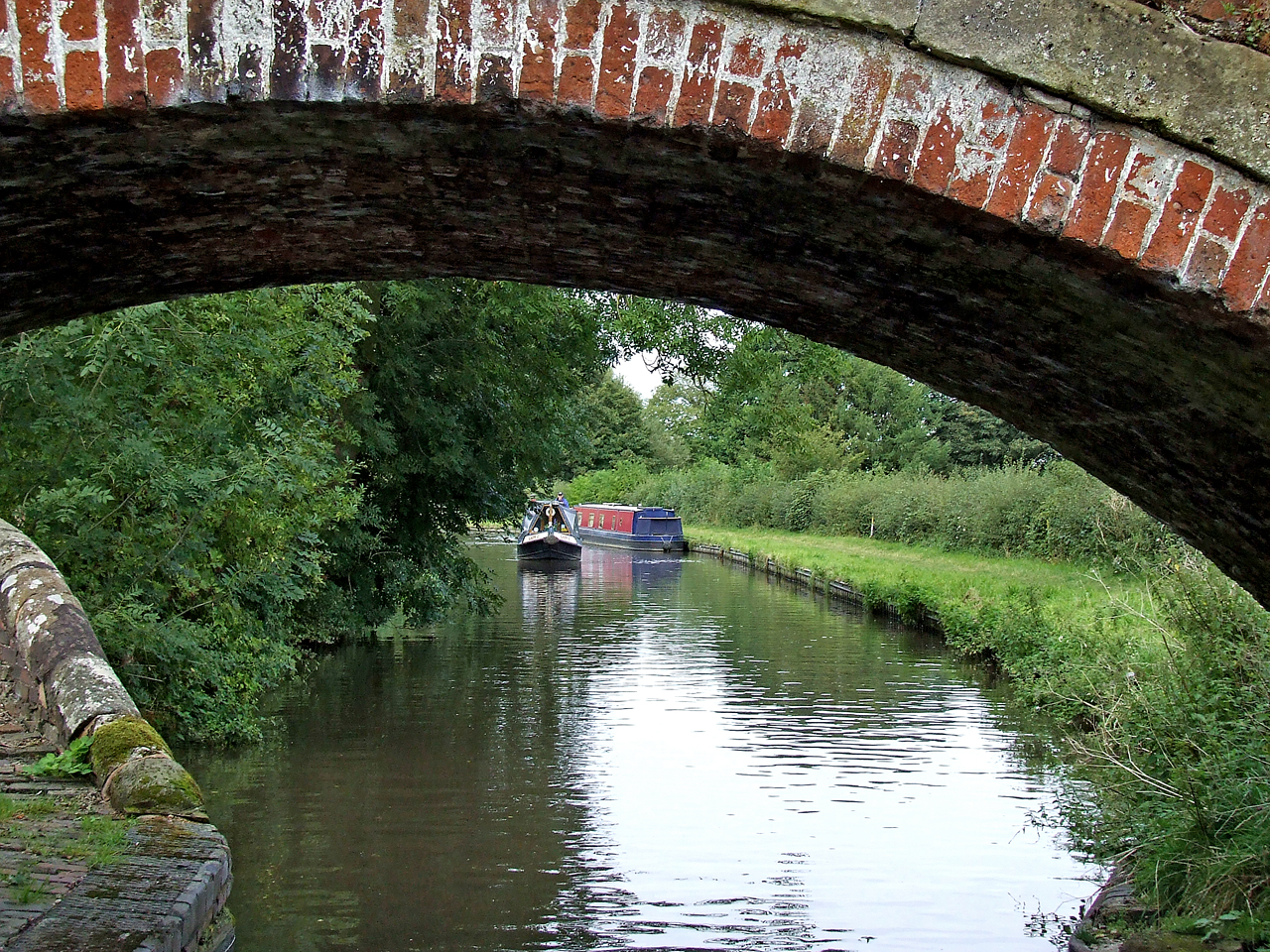
View through Milford Bridge, Staffordshire and Worcestershire Canal, Milford

Milford was described as a "pleasant hamlet" by the 1851 History, Gazetteer and Directory of Staffordshire, it then being part of Baswich parish. There is no church, the church at Walton-on-the-Hill, Staffordshire being less than a mile away.

== Administration ==
Milford forms part of the civil parish of Berkswich which, in turn, forms part of the borough of Stafford.

== Leisure activities ==
Milford Common (grid reference SJ973211) is a popular recreation spot for local people, and has traditionally been the site of many travelling fairs. The open space and quiet roads around the Common have made it a popular gathering point for horse riders from surrounding areas. The entrance to the National Trust Shugborough estate faces the common. Shugborough houses the county's official museum.

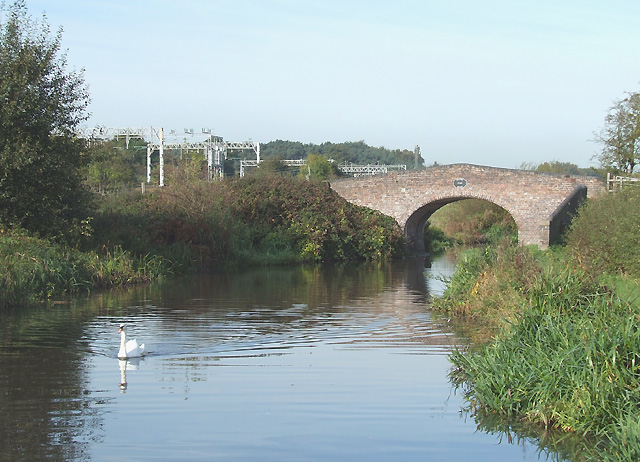
The Staffordshire and Worcestershire Canal approaching Walton Bridge, No 104.

Cannock Chase AONB is nearby. Its borders extend to about a mile south of the village, and the extensive Chase area offers a variety of outdoor activities including several leisure cycling routes.

Milford Hall is a privately owned 18th-century country mansion house at Milford. It is the home of the Levett Haszard family and is a Grade II listed building.

The Staffordshire Way long-distance footpath passes very near Milford, to the south-east. It also lies on the Heart of England Way.

== Access ==
The nearest railway station is in the town of Stafford, about four miles from Milford. Stafford station currently serves most inter-city services running on the West Coast Main Line Birmingham-Manchester route, as well as offering local services.

Road access is by way of the A513 road. Milford is accessible by canal narrowboat, along the Staffordshire and Worcestershire Canal. There is a cycle path along the Staffordshire and Worcestershire Canal towpath, leading to the National Cycle Network National Route 5 that currently ends at Walton-on-the-Hill, but will be extended southwards to Birmingham.

== Provisional IRA attack ==
On 18 September 1990, the former governor of Gibraltar, Sir Peter Terry was shot at his home in Milford by the Provisional IRA. Terry, then aged 64, survived the shooting, but his face had to be surgically reconstructed. It was said that the shooting took place as a revenge for his role in Operation Flavius in 1988, in which three IRA operatives were killed.

== Famous people ==
Nearby Shugborough Hall was the home of the late photographer Lord Lichfield and numerous members of the Levett family are from Milford Hall.

== See also ==
- Listed buildings in Berkswich
