= Milford Hall =

Country house in Staffordshire, England

Coordinates: 52.7881°N 2.0531°W

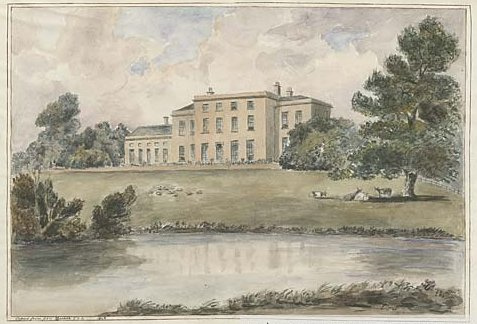
View of Milford Hall, by John Buckler, 1848

Milford Hall is a privately owned 18th-century English country house at Milford, near Stafford. It is the family seat of the Levett Haszard family and is a Grade II listed building.

== Association with Levett family ==
The estate passed to the Levett family in 1749 when Reverend Richard Levett, son of the Rector of Blithfield, Staffordshire, married Lucy Byrd, heiress of Milford and a descendant of the Byrd family of Cheshire. (The Levett family came from Sussex, and the Staffordshire Levetts retain ownership of the papers of family relation William Levett, who was groom of the bedchamber to King Charles I, accompanying the King to his imprisonment in Carisbrooke Castle on the Isle of Wight and ultimately to his execution.)

Milford Hall contains an ancient illuminated pedigree with heraldic arms of the family traced from its roots in Sussex and Normandy in the 11th century. Also at Milford Hall is a replica of an ancient bronze seal found in the 19th century near Eastbourne (now in the collection of the Lewes Castle Museum) bearing the coat-of-arms of John Livet. The signet is believed to have belonged to one of the first family members who was lord of the manor of Firle, East Sussex, in 1316.

This Sussex family produced Sir Richard Levett, a powerful merchant and Lord Mayor of London and owner of Kew Palace, who was the son of Reverend Richard Levett (brother of William, courtier to King Charles) of Ashwell, Rutland, and Dr. William Levett, Principal of Magdalen Hall, Oxford, and Dean of Bristol. The family is of Anglo-Norman descent and derives its name from the village of Livet (now Jonquerets-de-Livet) in Normandy. The Levett family represented Staffordshire in Parliament in the 18th and 19th centuries.

A 19th century daughter of the house, Frances M. Levett, wrote several books, including Gentle Influence: or the Cousin's Visit, which were published in London under her first initials.

== Architecture ==
Levett replaced the existing house with a new mansion in the Georgian style. The main east fronting block had three storeys and four bays flanked by two double storey two bayed wings and with a five-bay orangery attached to the south. The central doorway carried pediment and Ionic pilasters.

The house was much extended and altered in 1817 by his son, also Richard Levett, when the pilasters and pediment were removed and the main entrance was moved to the west front.

== Family history ==
The United Kingdom census, 1881 shows the Levett family and fourteen servants in residence.

About this time, two cousins married. Captain William Swynnerton Byrd Levett, JP, was named in part for his Swynnerton ancestors of Swynnerton, and Butterton. He was an 1873 graduate of Eton College.

The woman was Maud Sophia, also born a Levett, the daughter of Major Edward Levett (10th Royal Hussars) of Rowsley, Derbyshire, a descendant of the Levetts of Wychnor Hall (or Wychnor Park), Staffordshire, and his wife Caroline Georgiana, daughter of Rev. Charles Thomas Longley, Archbishop of Canterbury. (Major Levett's second wife was Susan Alice Arkwright, a descendant of Sir Richard Arkwright.) Maud Levett was a writer on religious and spiritual topics, publishing several books.

The couple had two children, a boy and a girl. Their son Lieut. Richard Byrd Levett, who attended Eton like his father before him, joined the 60th Rifles, King's Royal Rifle Corps, was twice wounded and was killed in France in the First World War. He died in an assault on the town of Irles on the morning of 14 March 1917. His mother wrote a memoir of his life.

Their daughter Dyonese, who researched and wrote a family history, married Colonel Gerald Haszard, OBE, Royal Marines. who was nominated Sheriff of Staffordshire in 1950 On the death of her father in 1929, she inherited the estate.

== Associated churches ==
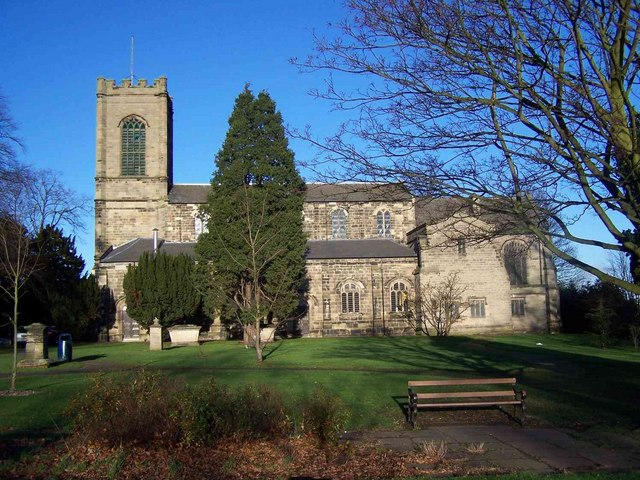
St. Augustine's Church, Rugeley

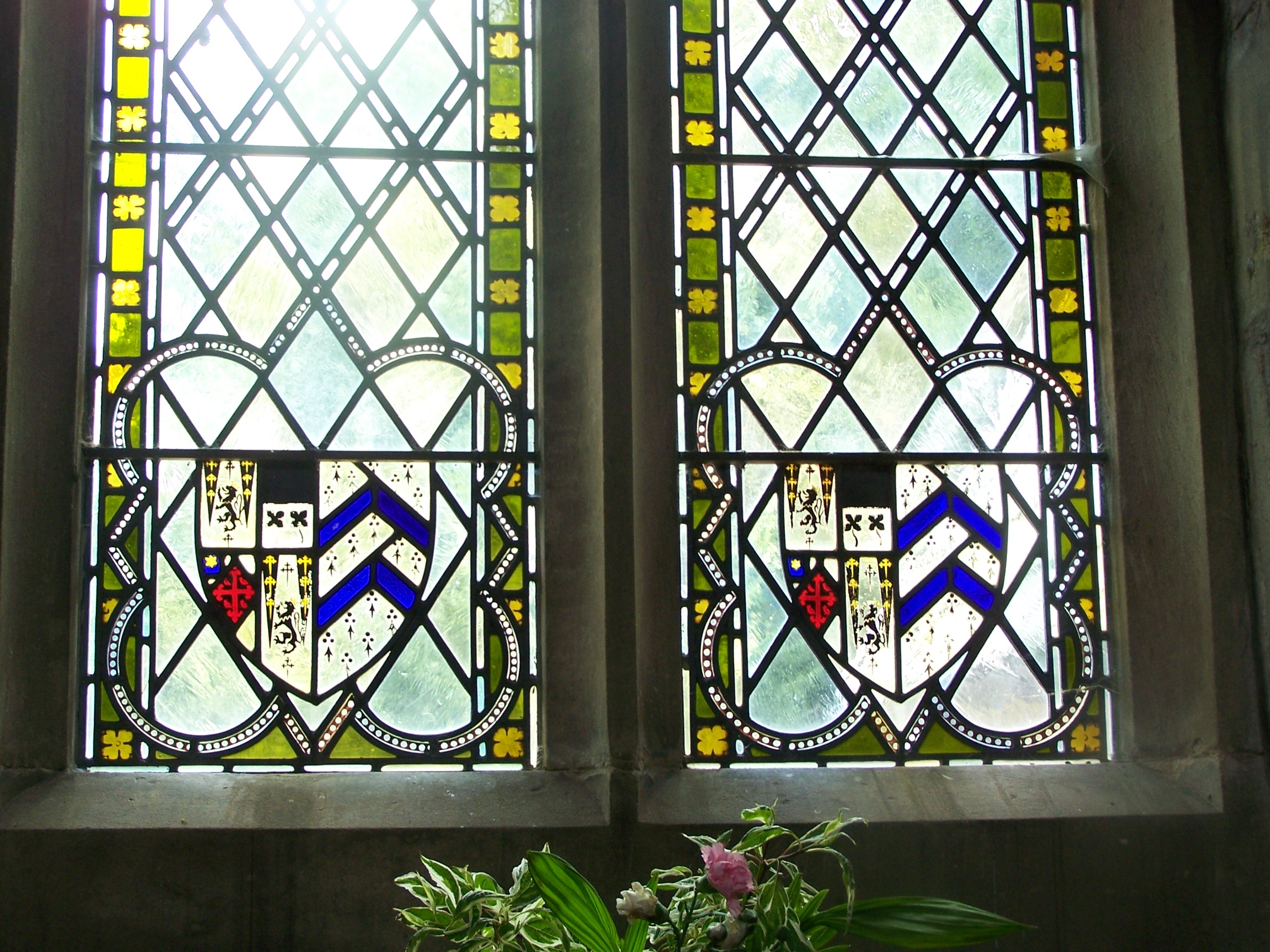
Arms of Levett impaling Bagot, St Leonard's Church, Blithfield

The Levetts of Milford Hall have long worshipped at nearby St. Thomas' Church, Walton-on-the-Hill, built in 1842 as a chapel of ease to the parish church at Berkswich. There are several monuments in the church to the family. For example, after World War I, Lieutenant Levett's parents erected a marble effigy in his honor at St Thomas's. His tomb displays the arms of Levett of Milford Hall for his father, William Swynnerton Byrd Levett, and the arms of Levett of Wychnor Park for his mother, Maud (Levett) Levett. St. Thomas's also contains unusual blue Minton Ltd tiles with the Levett initials in buff lettering.

There are also memorials to the family in St. Augustine Church in nearby Rugeley, and at the church at Holy Trinity Church in Berkswich, Staffordshire, where the Levett and Chetwynd families had private pews.

== Intermarriages ==
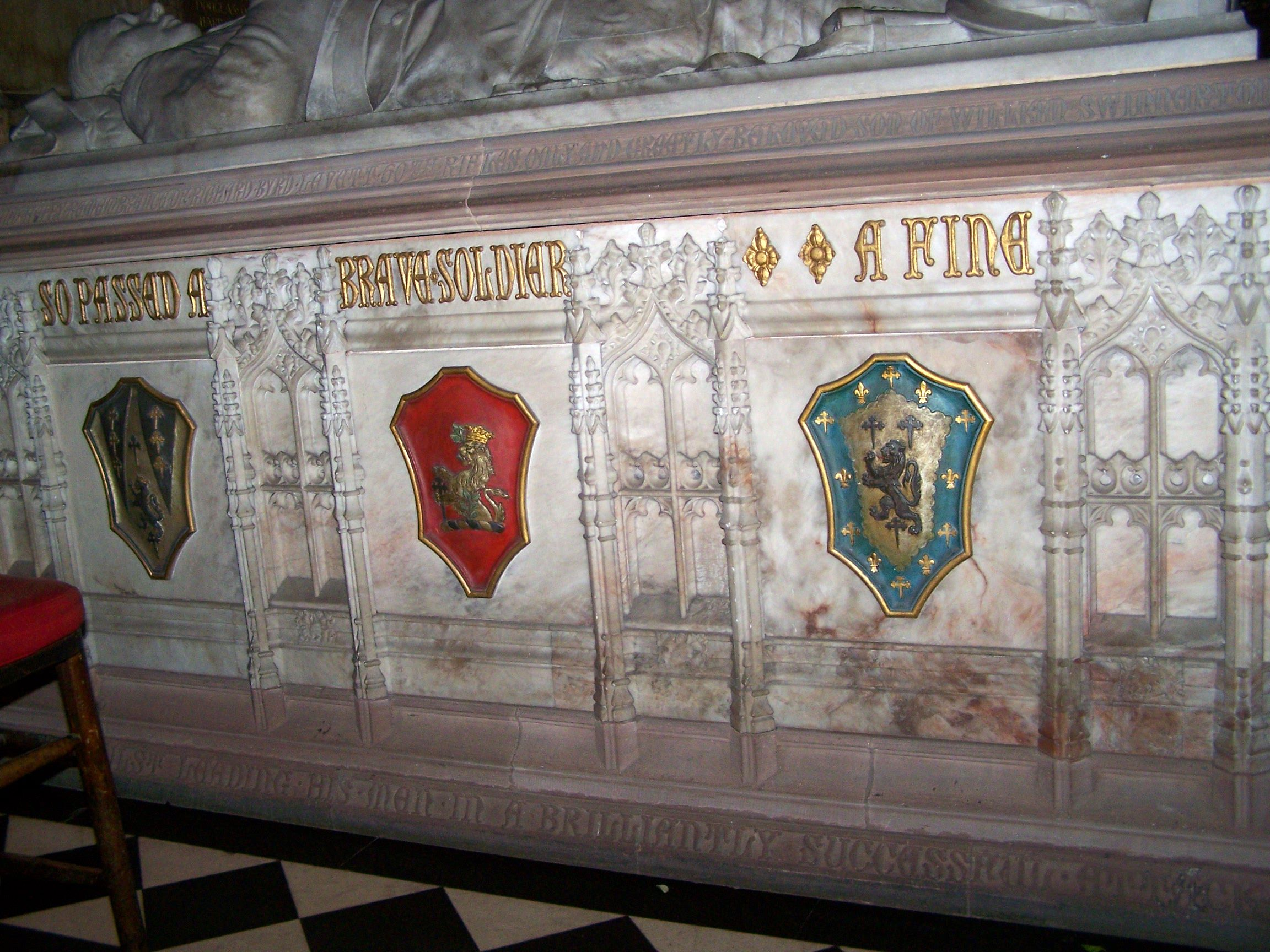
Tomb of Lieutenant Richard Byrd Levett, King's Royal Rifle Corps, Church of St Thomas, Walton-on-the-Hill. Arms of Levett of Milford Hall and Levett of Wychnor Park

The Levetts of Milford Hall have intermarried into other landowning families. As described above, the current owners of Milford Hall are descended from two branches of the Levett family which united in the marriage of Maud Sophia Levett, descendant of the Wychnor Hall and Packington Hall side, and William Swynnerton Byrd Levett, scion of the Milford Hall.

Nearby is Shugborough Hall, the ancestral estate of the Anson family, the Earls of Lichfield. The Levett family of Milford is related to the Ansons, and the Levett Haszard family sit on the board of Shugborough Hall.

The Levetts also intermarried with the Bagot family from nearby Pype Hayes Hall, a branch of the Bagots of Bagot's Bromley, Staffordshire, and Blithfield Hall.

The Levett-Scrivener family, for instance, live near Yoxford, Suffolk, where they have owned for centuries the ruins of Sibton Abbey, the only Cistercian abbey in East Anglia. The Howard family, Dukes of Norfolk, were granted Sibton Abbey by the Crown at the dissolution of the monasteries. Sibton Abbey and Sibton Manor were subsequently sold in 1610 to Ralph Scrivener, barrister of Ipswich. The Abbey is in ruins, but the refectory and the south wall of the nave survive, although the ruins are heavily overgrown.

Not all Levetts retained the family name. Lieut-Col Richard W. B. Mirehouse (1849–1914), High Sheriff of Pembrokeshire, Wales, 1886, and Lieutenant Colonel of 4th Batt. North Staffs Regiment, was born Richard W. B. Levett of Milford Hall. He changed his name to that of his mother's family.

== Currently ==
The Levett Haszard family retains ownership of Milford Hall. Milford Hall is private and the mansion and grounds are not open to the public. Col. Gerald Fenwick Haszard served as High Sheriff of Staffordshire in 1952, and Richard Byrd Levett Haszard currently served likewise in 2009.

== See also ==
- Listed buildings in Berkswich
