= River Sow Navigation =

Canal in Staffordshire, England

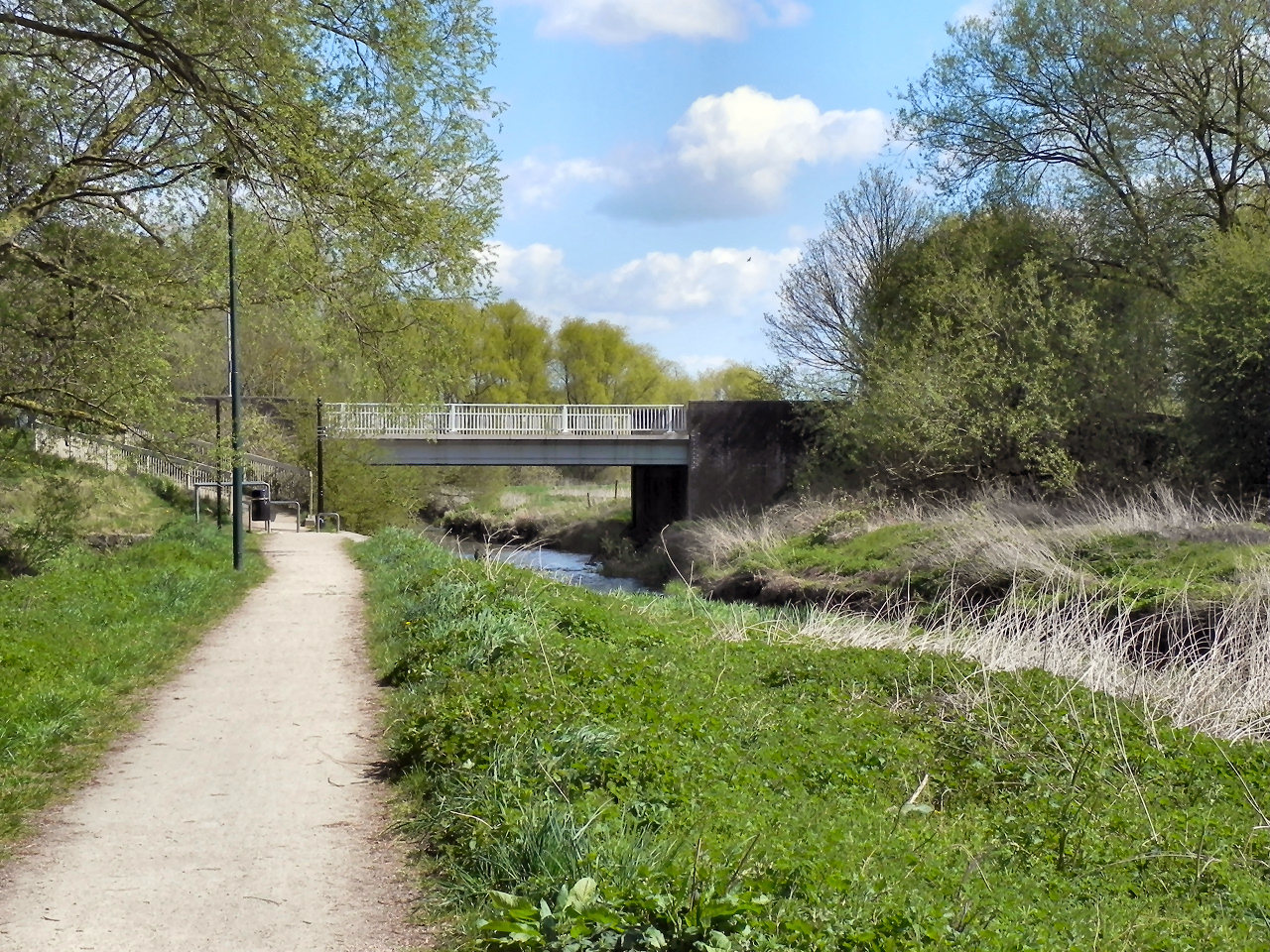
- The river at Fairway Bridge

Specifications
- Locks: 1
- Status: abandoned

History
- Date of act: Privately built
- Date of first use: 1816
- Date closed: 1920s

Geography
- Start point: Stafford
- End point: Baswich
- Connects to: Staffordshire and Worcestershire Canal

The River Sow Navigation was a short river navigation in Staffordshire, England, which connected the Staffordshire and Worcestershire Canal to the centre of Stafford. There was a coal wharf in Stafford, and a single lock to connect it to the canal. It opened in 1816, and closed in the 1920s. There are proposals to restore the navigation as the Stafford Riverway Link.

== History ==
The Staffordshire and Worcestershire Canal provided a navigable link between the River Severn and Birmingham, and had been opened in May 1772. It served Stafford by the provision of a wharf at Radford Bank, but goods had to be transferred to carts for the final 1.5-mile (2.4 km) journey into the town. The first proposals for a navigable link to Stafford were made in 1798. The scheme involved aqueducts to cross the River Sow and the River Penk, but the canal was not built. In order to supply Stafford, a horse tramway was constructed from the town to Radford Wharf, which opened on 1 November 1805. The Stafford Railway Coal and Lime Company owned the tramway, on which horses hauled wagons capable of holding around 1.5 tons of coal or lime. The terminus was by Green Bridge in Stafford, but it appears that it was not a profitable concern, as John Hall, one of the four owners, sold his £810 share in the business for £254 in 1811, and the company was bankrupt by 1813.

A navigation was again proposed in 1810 by Owen Hall, who wanted to make the Penk and the Sow navigable, and obtained permission from the Staffordshire and Worcestershire Canal to construct a lock at Radford. By 1812, the plans included an inclined plane to connect the Penk and the Sow to the main canal. By the time it was built, it had been simplified by connecting the Sow directly to the canal at Baswich. The lock was opened on 19 February 1816, and so the canal cannot have been used before that, although the railway had been sold in 1814. Although it used the river, much of the channel was a new cut, designed to eliminate a series of sharp bends which remained as oxbow lakes to the south of the new route and were still clearly visible on maps in 1938.

The canal was privately built, as all the land through which it ran was owned by Sir George William Jerningham, later Lord Stafford. A lease for its use was initially held by Messrs Fereday and Company who owned Gornal colliery. This was later transferred to the Moat Colliery Company, and in 1838, they sold it to the Staffordshire and Worcestershire Canal company for £50. Subsequently, the branch was improved and the tolls were reduced. At Stafford, the navigation had its own channel, separated from the river by a narrow strip of land, which carried the towpath, and there was a coal wharf to the south of the channel. The area was bounded to the west by Green Bridge, originally constructed in the thirteenth century, but rebuilt in brick and stone in 1781/2 and widened in the 1860s. A wooden footbridge carried the towpath from the north bank of the river to the north bank of the coal wharf channel.

=== Decline ===
The Staffordshire and Worcestershire Canal leased the navigation from Lord Stafford throughout its life, but did not renew the lease in 1927. Adam Boulton leased the coal wharf at Stafford until 1927, but there is no record of its use after that date. The coal wharf channel was filled in during the 1930s, and the writer Tom Rolt wrote that the entrance from the canal was blocked in 1944. Although Stafford Borough Council were hopeful for its future when they surveyed it in 1948, it continued to decline. Most of the infrastructure near the lock was removed in the 1970s, as part of a scheme to improve flood relief on the Penk and the Sow. The Penk itself was diverted into the Deepmoor Drain, over which the aqueduct used to run, and now joins the Sow much closer to St Thomas Bridge.

=== Restoration ===
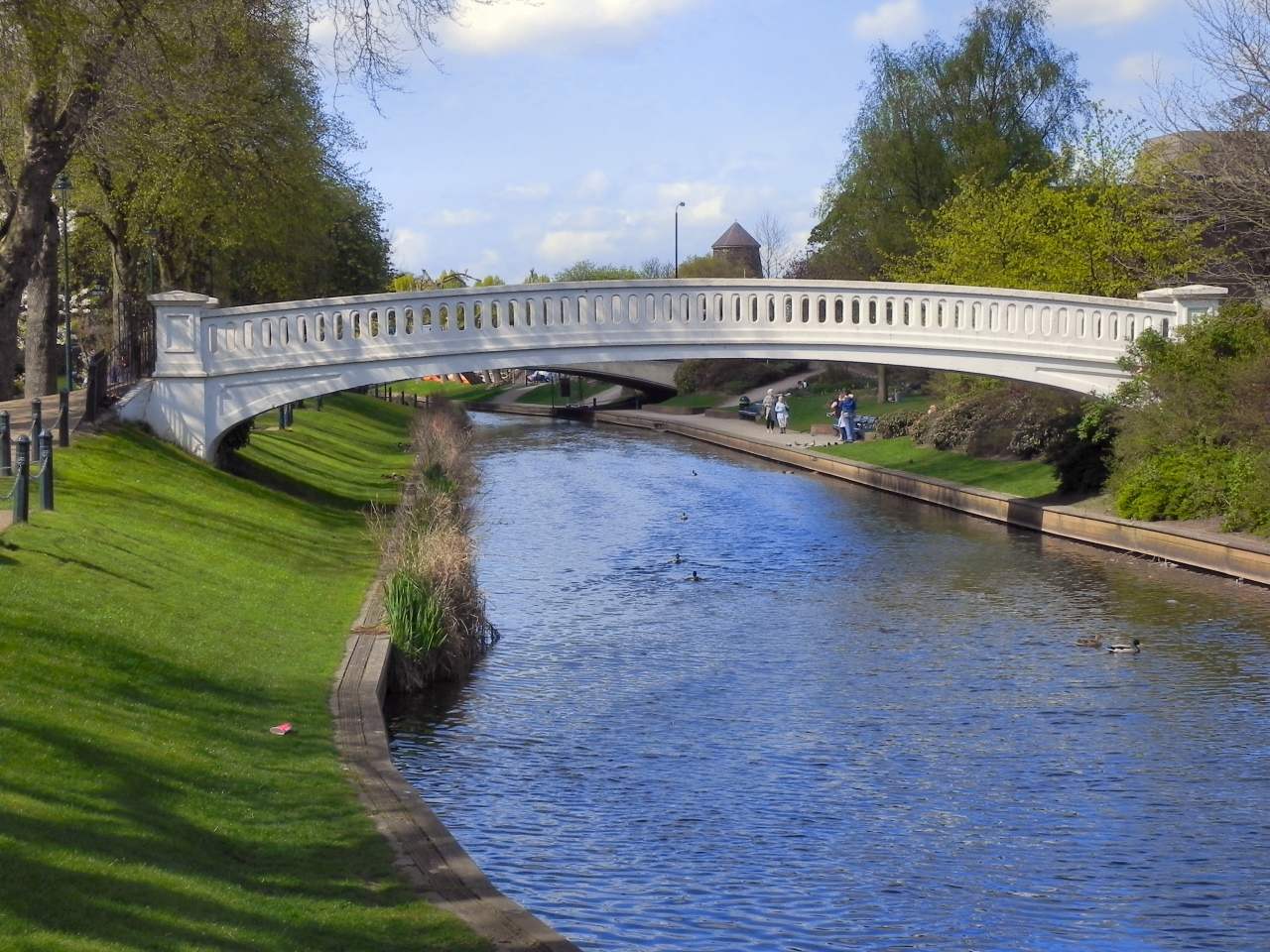
The River Sow at Victoria Park. The terminus of the Stafford Riverway Link would eventually be near here.

With the steady progress made in restoring and reopening canals during the 1970s, members of a local canal society first suggested that the navigation could be restored in 1975. It was seen as a way to ease congestion on the Staffordshire and Worcestershire Canal, and the group suggested that the appropriate authorities should review the possibilities. The next significant event was the publishing of a letter in Waterways World in August 2002, in which a resident of Stafford called Keith Taylor stated that he had found the remains of the lock. The towpath had by then become a recognised walking route, and his suggestion that the navigation should be explored led to research by a number of others, and the formation of Stafford Riverway Link, a group which would spearhead the restoration and attempt to gain local authority support for it. The group became a community interest company in December 2009.

Because of the flood relief work and the diversion of the River Penk, the Environment Agency are unlikely to approve the reinstatement of the aqueduct. A feasibility study for reconstruction, carried out by the engineers Halcrow Group, has therefore suggested a lock much closer to the junction with the Staffordshire and Worcestershire Canal, to connect the canal to the River Penk. The new route would either follow the Penk downstream to its junction with the Sow, or a new cut would be made between the two. The initial proposal is to reach a temporary terminus just below Green Bridge, close to the Asda Supermarket. The estimated cost for a navigation with a channel which is 4 feet (1.2 m) deep is £4.7 million. In the longer term, the aim is for the terminus to be at Victoria Park, a little way upstream from the town centre, and this would increase the cost to £6 million.

Significant progress was made in early 2021, when Stafford Borough Council granted planning permission for the first stage of the project. This involves the creation of a basin at Baswich with 12 berths, reinstatement of the junction into the Staffordshire and Worcestershire Canal, and the construction of a bridge across the junction to carry users of the towpath and farm vehicles. Prior to receiving permission, the company had already excavated part of the basin, as they had been leasing the land on a peppercorn rent from Eunice Finney, in accordance with the wishes of her late husband Bill.

== Route ==
The navigation left the Staffordshire and Worcestershire Canal immediately opposite Baswich Salt Works. A roving bridge carried the canal towpath over the channel, which headed north. A small aqueduct carried it over a drainage ditch, and into the lock. At normal river levels, the fall of the lock was about 6.5 feet (2.0 m). The course turned to the north-west, to join the River Sow, with the towpath on the south bank. Most traffic turned left, to proceed upstream, but boats could also reach St Thomas flour mill a little way downstream, although this was not advisable when the river was in flood. Immediately after the junction, the River Penk joined the Sow, and a footbridge carried the towpath over the confluence.

The river follows a generally western course towards Stafford. At Fairway Bridge, the site of the first of the oxbox lakes formed by straightening the channel, the towpath crosses to the north bank of the river. The next bridge carried Riverway over the navigation. Its single span is made of reinforced concrete, and it was designed by William Plant, who was the Stafford Town surveyor and engineer at the time. It was formally opened on 15 December 1914. The next bridge is much more recent. It was built in the late 1970s and carries the A34 road, here called Queensway. The coal wharf channel left the river just to the west of the bridge site, and ended just before Green Bridge, which carries Bridge Street.

On the north bank of the river to the east of Green Bridge there were public Brine Baths, which were called the Royal Brine Baths after a visit by Princess Mary, later the wife of King George V, in 1895. There was a boatyard beside the baths in 1907, where canoes and rowing boats could be hired by the public, and boating for pleasure was popular at that time.

== Points of interest ==
Point	Coordinates (Links to map resources)	OS Grid Ref	Notes
Site of Town Mill	52.8042°N 2.1184°W	SJ921229	Stafford
End of navigation	52.8047°N 2.1156°W	SJ923230	by Green Bridge
Start of coal wharf cut	52.8045°N 2.1132°W	SJ924230	
A34 Queensway Bridge	52.8041°N 2.1119°W	SJ925229	
Riverway Bridge	52.8038°N 2.1062°W	SJ929229	
Fairway Bridge	52.8034°N 2.0997°W	SJ933228	
Junction with lock cut	52.8030°N 2.0858°W	SJ943228	(Penk joined here)
Junction with Staffs and Worcs Canal	52.8020°N 2.0845°W	SJ944227	

== Bibliography ==
- Hadfield, Charles (1985). The Canals of the West Midlands. David and Charles. ISBN 978-0-7153-8644-6.
- Jones, David J. (June 2006). "Stafford Riverway Link" (PDF). Stafford Riverway Link. Archived from the original (PDF) on 8 March 2019.
- Potter, Hugh (December 2012). "Stafford Riverway Link". Waterways World. ISSN 0309-1422.
- Squires, Roger (2008). Britain's restored canals. Landmark Publishing. ISBN 978-1-84306-331-5.
