= Listed buildings in Berkswich =

Berkswich is a civil parish in the Borough of Stafford, Staffordshire, England. It contains nine listed buildings that are recorded in the National Heritage List for England. All the listed buildings are designated at Grade II, the lowest of the three grades, which is applied to "buildings of national importance and special interest". The parish contains the village of Milford, and Baswich, a suburb of the town of Stafford. The Staffordshire and Worcestershire Canal passes through the parish, and the listed buddings associated with this are two accommodation bridges and an aqueduct. The other listed buildings are a timber framed cottage, two large houses, a road bridge, a smithy, and a pair of lodges at the entrance to Shugborough Park.

== Buildings ==
Name and location	Photograph	Date	Notes
14 The Village, Walton on the Hill; 52.78640°N 2.06610°W	—	17th century	The cottage, which has been altered and extended, is partly timber framed with brick infill and partly in brick, and has a tile roof. There is one storey and an attic, originally two bays, with extensions at both ends. On the front is a gabled porch on brackets, the windows are casements, two with segmental heads, at the right end is a gabled casement, and there are two raking dormers. Inside, there is exposed timber framing and two bressumer fireplaces.
Congreve House; 52.78676°N 2.06627°W	—	17th century	The house has a timber framed core, it is encased in brick, and has a tile roof. It has two storeys, cellars and attics, and a T-shaped plan, with two rectangular ranges. There is a string course and moulded eaves, and all the openings have shallow segmental arches. Inside there is an inglenook fireplace with a timber bressummer.
Milford Hall; 52.78804°N 2.05298°W		18th century	A large house in rendered brick with a dentilled eaves course, and hipped slate roofs. It is in Georgian style, and has an L-shaped plan, with a main block of three storeys with a parapet, flanking wings of two storeys, and a long single-storey south wing. The east front has eight bays, the doorway has a hood on console brackets, and the windows are sashes.
Bridge No. 105 (Milford Bridge); 52.78961°N 2.04940°W		Late 18th century	An accommodation bridge over the Staffordshire and Worcestershire Canal, it was designed by James Brindley. The bridge is in brick with sandstone coping, partly replaced in engineering brick. It consists of a single semi-elliptical arch, with a sandstone string course and a plain parapet. It is ramped down to the towpath on the west side, and there are corner piers on the east side.
Holdiford Bridge; 52.79157°N 2.03833°W		Late 18th century (probable)	The bridge carries Holdiford Road over the River Sow. It is in stone, and consists of three segmental arches, the middle arch higher than the outer arches. On each side is a moulded string course.
Aqueduct West of Holdiford Bridge; 52.79089°N 2.04254°W		Early 19th century (probable)	The aqueduct carries the Staffordshire and Worcestershire Canal over the River Sow. It is in stone, and consists of four segmental arches.
Bridge No. 104 (Walton Bridge); 52.79246°N 2.05774°W		Early to mid 19th century	An accommodation bridge over the Staffordshire and Worcestershire Canal, it is in brick with coping in sandstone, engineering brick, and concrete. The bridge consists of a single shallow elliptical arch with a plain parapet. The south abutments and the retaining walls to the north end in square piers.
The Smithy, Walton on the Hill; 52.78633°N 2.06592°W	—	Late 19th century	The smithy is in brick with dentilled eaves in red and blue brick and a tile roof. There is a single storey, with a slightly projecting gabled entrance on the right containing a segmental-headed doorway, and a window with a stone surround above. To the left is a shuttered opening with a segmental head.
Stafford Lodges, Shugborough Park; 52.78745°N 2.03726°W		Undated	The lodges flanking the entrance to the drive are in stone, each with a plain parapet and a pyramidal slate roof. Each lodge has a square plan, a single storey, two Doric columns on each front, a doorway with a square frame, and sash windows. Between the lodges are wrought iron gates.
