= Walton-on-the-Hill, Staffordshire =

Village in Staffordshire, England

Coordinates: 52.78579°N 2.06478°W

Walton-on-the-Hill
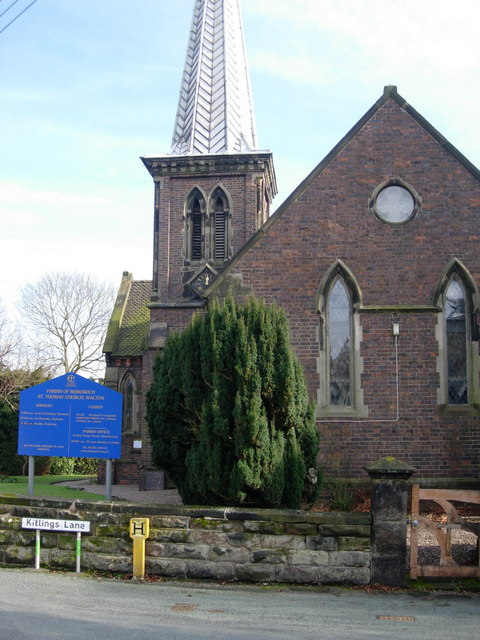
- St Thomas Church

- Location within Staffordshire
- Civil parish: Berkswich
- District: Stafford
- Shire county: Staffordshire
- Region: West Midlands
- Country: England
- Sovereign state: United Kingdom
- Post town: Stafford
- Postcode district: ST17
- Police: Staffordshire
- Fire: Staffordshire
- Ambulance: West Midlands
- UK Parliament: Stone, Great Wyrley and Penkridge

Walton-on-the-Hill is a village in the civil parish of Berkswich, in the Stafford district, in Staffordshire, England. It is about 3 miles (4.8 km) east of the centre of Stafford, and lies on the A513 road. The population in the 2021 census was included under the Berkswich ward. The official population in 2021 was 1,916 compared to the 2011 United Kingdom census which was 2,010.

== History ==
The settlement is mentioned in the Domesday Book as having four people, two ploughs, and 4 acres (1.6 ha) of meadow. The settlement was known simply as Walton until 1900, when the suffix on-the-hill was added.

Walton-on-the-Hill also features St Thomas Church which was built by Thomas Trubshaw and dedicated to St Thomas the Apostle as a chapel of ease in 1842. Although St Thomas’ Church did not have an easy beginning. In 1845 the spire was struck by lightning and part of it destroyed. Windows and part of the roof were damaged. Repairs were completed in 1887 but by 1903, it was considered unsafe. The lead roof was replaced with a lighter one and the heavy weathercock was removed and a less weighty one put in its place The total cost of repairs was £175.

Also, on Walton-on-the-Hill there is a pump Halfway between London and Holyhead, the village pump was used to water the mail coach horses as well as providing water for the village until mains water was introduced in the early 1900s. In 1983, when only the top of the pump was visible, residents removed tons of earth and revealed a stone trough. The site, which has been restored, provides a focal point of historical interest for the village. A timber-framed brick-clad building, originally known as Manor Farm, Congreve House was named after Thomas Congreve (1714-1777). His son, Sir William Congreve, 2nd Baronet, invented the Congreve Rocket. Congreve rockets, being made of iron, were stronger than others available in Europe at this time. The rockets were used effectively during the Napoleonic Wars and the war against the United States in 1814. The use of the rocket inspired the composition of The Star-Spangled Banner, adopted as the national anthem of the United States.

Walton-on-the-Hill is home to three schools of all different ages, there is Bright Horizons Nursery and preschool. There is also Berkswich Primary School which is a part of the Church of England. The last one is Walton High School, Stafford for children from the ages 11-16 but this school does offer a Sixth Form so this school can have children from the age of 11 to 18. The village amenities include several shops and Walton High School. East of Walton-on-the-Hill are Shugborough Hall (2 mi) and Milford (1 mi). There is a local leisure and equestrian hotspot. To the west there is a small shopping centre.

The village was designated as a conservation area in March 1977.
