= Walton High School, Stafford =

Walton High School

Location
- The Rise; Stafford, Staffordshire, ST17 0LJ; England
- Coordinates: 52°47′11″N 2°04′14″W

Information
- Type: Academy
- Motto: Persevere
- Local authority: Staffordshire County Council
- Trust: Walton Multi-Academy Trust
- Department for Education URN: 142987 Tables
- Ofsted: Reports
- Headteacher: Andrew Leese
- Gender: Mixed
- Age: 11 to 18
- Enrolment: 1267 As of October 2024
- Houses: Deercote (Green) Hazelslade(Yellow) Kingsley(Red) Oldacre(Blue)
- Colour: Red (KS3) or Black (KS4) with additional colours for houses
- Website: www.waltonstaffs.com

Walton High School is a large mixed secondary school and sixth form serving a community in the southern part of Stafford, England.

There are approximately 1316 students on roll. The school catchment area is 4.5 miles (7.2 km) around the school.

Previously a community school administered by Staffordshire County Council, in September 2016 Walton High School converted to academy status. The school is now the lead school in the Walton Multi-Academy Trust.

== Controversy ==
In 2003 an illegal spy camera was placed by staff. Permission was not obtained for this camera, and its installation contravened child safety guidelines. It was said that it was installed to prevent weekend thefts. However, this camera was discovered on a Wednesday and therefore was still in place during weekdays. It was discovered by contractors repairing an extractor fan, who informed the head and the relevant authorities.

== Notable former pupils ==
- Neil Basu, former Assistant Commissioner in the Metropolitan Police Service and head of Counter Terrorism Policing for the UK
- Dave Gorman, comedian, author, and television presenter
- Julia Hills, actress
- Jonathan Ive, designer of the iMac, iPod, iPhone, and iPad, among others
- Hayden Norris, U-23 European champion and commonwealth games track cyclist
