= Berkswich =

Civil parish in Staffordshire, England

Coordinates: 52°47′19″N 2°4′15″W

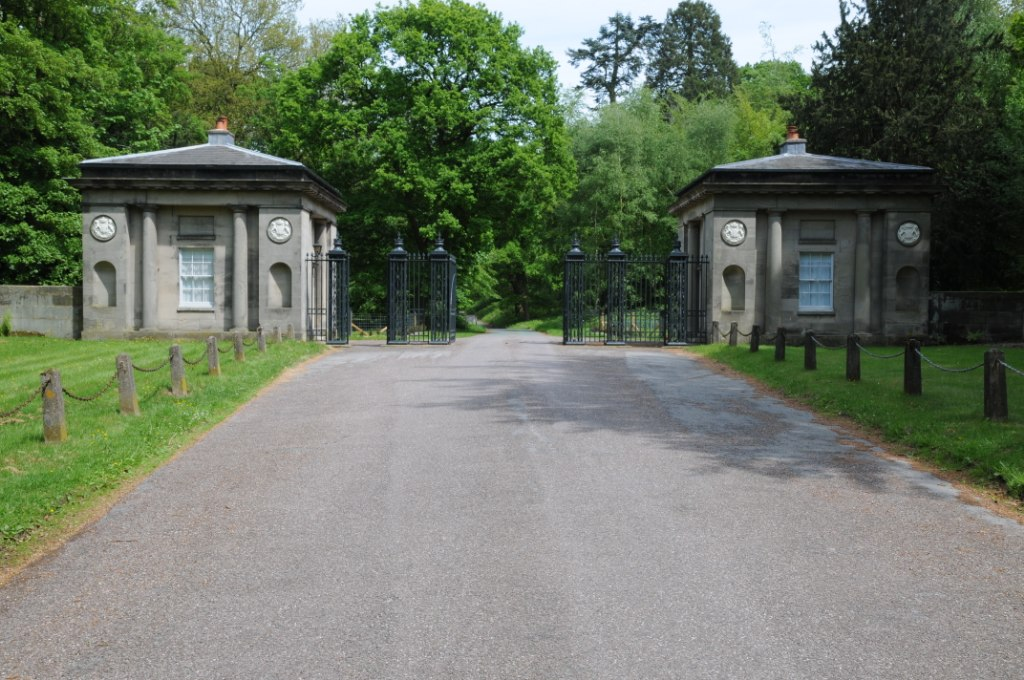
- Stafford Lodges

- Location within Staffordshire
- Population: 2,010 (2011 census)
- Civil parish: Berkswich
- District: Stafford
- Shire county: Staffordshire
- Region: West Midlands
- Country: England
- Sovereign state: United Kingdom
- Post town: STAFFORD
- Postcode district: ST17
- Website: https://berkswichpc.co.uk

Berkswich (/ˈbɑːkswɪtʃ/ BAHK-switch) is a civil parish in the borough of Stafford in Staffordshire, England. According to the 2001 census it had a population of 1,528, being recalculated as 2,010 at the 2011 Census.

Berkswich Civil Parish should not be confused with Berkswich Church of England Parish in the Lichfield Diocese as they cover differing geographical areas. Berkswich Civil Parish covers the villages of Walton-on-the-Hill and Milford. Berkswich Church of England Parish covers those villages along with Baswich, Weeping Cross and Wildwood. Berkswich can be found on the south-eastern fringe of Stafford.

On 24 March 1976 the parish was renamed from "Baswich" to "Berkswich".

== See also ==
- Listed buildings in Berkswich
