= Baswich =

Estate on the south eastern side of Stafford

Coordinates: 52°47′49″N 2°5′9″W

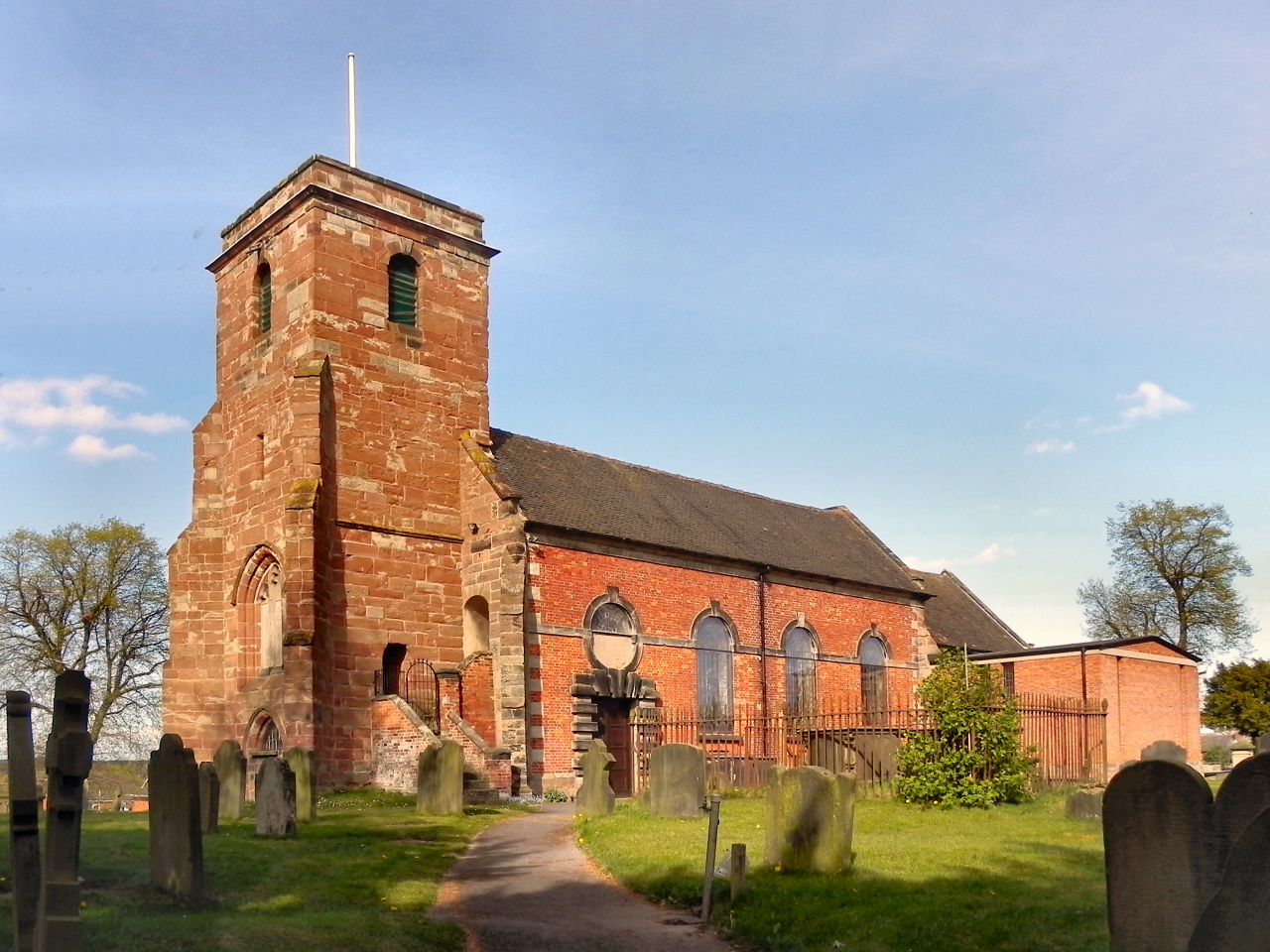
- Holy Trinity Church, Baswich. Mentioned in Domesday, the church's earliest portion is the north pillar of the chancel arch.

- Location within Staffordshire
- District: Stafford
- Shire county: Staffordshire
- Region: West Midlands
- Country: England
- Sovereign state: United Kingdom

Baswich is an estate on the south eastern side of Stafford, in the Stafford district, in the county of Staffordshire, England.

Baswich amenities are a local Co-op store, an independent hairdressers, and Leasowes primary school (ST17 0HT). The majority of Baswich is private housing.

== History ==
Prior to 1851, the terms Berkswich and Baswich were used interchangeably, to refer to a larger area which included the townships of Baswich and Brockton. At that time, it comprised an area of 6,200 acres (2,500 ha), and had a population of 1,448. Baswich township consisted of an area of 1,600 acres (650 ha) and included the hamlets of Radford, Weeping-Cross, Walton and Milford, but there was no village with the name of Baswich. Holy Trinity Church was isolated from any of the hamlets, as there was no housing in its immediate vicinity. The two townships became part of Stafford Poor Law Union, as a result of the passing of the Poor Law Amendment Act in 1834. The Union was created on 28 September 1836, and provided centralised poor relief for 19 parishes. Baswich elected one of the 27 Guardians to the controlling Board, who erected a new workhouse on Marston Road, to the north of Stafford, in 1837–8.

The building of housing near the church is relatively recent, as Baswich Lane is shown on maps in 1938 running through open fields, with the church as the only building. By 1954, there were some houses on either side of the lane, but by the time the 1973 map was published, the present pattern of housing estates covering most of the area bounded by the canal was established.

The area occupied by the business park has been an industrial site since around 1900. There is no evidence of activity on the 1891 map, but by 1901 a salt works had been established to the west of Baswich Lane, with a large building, a reservoir, and a conveyor to railway sidings. Salt deposits had been discovered on Stafford Common in 1881, when the Corporation made trial borings to search for a water supply. From 1891 it supplied the Brine Baths by Green Bridge, which became the Royal Brine Baths after a visit by Princess Mary, who later became the wife of King George V. From 1893, the Stafford Salt and Alkali Company began pumping brine from 360 feet (110 m) below the Common and processing it. The Baswich Works was the company's second works, opened in 1894, and it was fed with brine by a 2-mile (3.2 km) pipeline, which ran from the Common through the town and along the towpath of the River Sow Navigation, supplying the Brine Baths on the way. To keep up with demand, the works was replaced by another works, built before the Second World War. A new vacuum plant was added in 1948. Later maps show the new salt works to the east of Baswich Lane, where more extensive railway sidings had been constructed. A large silt pond to the north of the site is evident, and the original salt works had become a pre-cast concrete works. In 1970, following a protracted legal battle, brine extraction was stopped, because of the subsidence that it caused. By 1990, the salt works site was occupied by Lodgefield caravan park, now a mobile home park. The concrete works has since been redeveloped as a business park.

Holy Trinity Church has complete records of baptisms from 1601 to 1937, of marriages from 1601 to 1974, and of burials from 1601 to 1909. They have been transferred to the Staffordshire Records Office for safekeeping.

== Transport ==
The western edge of the village is defined by the Staffordshire and Worcestershire Canal and the valley of the River Penk. The canal turns to the east and then the south east along the valley of the River Sow to define the northern and north-eastern boundaries. The railway line to Stafford cuts across the northern edge of this area, and forms a boundary for the housing. Baswich Business Park is sandwiched between the railway and the canal. Baswich was the site of a lock which connected the canal to the River Sow. The river was made navigable into Stafford, and the River Sow Navigation was operational between 1814 and the 1920s. Baswich is served by Chaserider services 826 and from May 2025 will have an additional service 827 after a period of withdrawal.

== Buildings ==
Holy Trinity Church is constructed of red brick and ashlar dressings, with a tiled roof. The chancel arch dates from the thirteenth century and the lower portion of the tower from the fifteenth. Most of the nave and chancel dates from 1740, and the tower was extended in the eighteenth century to house a peal of bells. The building is grade II* listed, and contains a painted chest tomb to Brian and Jehanna Fowler, which carries the date 1587. The churchyard includes a number of interesting tombs, which are individually listed, including two chest tombs enclosed by iron railings, commemorating members of the Harding family, and a square monument capped by a cornice and urn, dedicated to members of the Salt family.

Baswich Lane crosses the railway, the canal and two channels of the River Sow. St Thomas Bridge carries the lane over the southern channel of the Sow. It is an ashlar elliptical-arched bridge, dating from around 1800. The canal bridge is made of brick with ashlar dressings, and is a good example of a bridge dating from the opening of the canal in nearly original condition. Two other bridges cross from the west of Baswich to the canal towpath, which is on the opposite side of the canal. Baswich Bridge is of similar construction to St Thomas Canal Bridge, while Meadow Bridge is a somewhat plainer brick structure.

== See also ==
- Listed buildings in Berkswich

== Bibliography ==
- Hadfield, Charles (1985). The Canals of the West Midlands. David and Charles. ISBN 0-7153-8644-1.
- Higginbotham, Peter (2011). "The Workhouse, Stafford". The Workhouse.
- Jones, David J. (June 2006). "Stafford Riverway Link" (PDF). Stafford Riverway Link. Archived from the original (PDF) on 8 March 2019.
- White, William (1851). History, Gazetteer and Directory of Staffordshire. Sheffield.
