= Listed buildings in Staffordshire =

There are a number of listed buildings in Staffordshire. The term "listed building", in the United Kingdom, refers to a building or structure designated as being of special architectural, historical, or cultural significance. Details of all the listed buildings are contained in the National Heritage List for England. They are categorised in three grades: Grade I consists of buildings of outstanding architectural or historical interest, Grade II* includes significant buildings of more than local interest and Grade II consists of buildings of special architectural or historical interest. Buildings in England are listed by the Secretary of State for Culture, Media and Sport on recommendations provided by English Heritage, which also determines the grading.

Some listed buildings are looked after by the National Trust or English Heritage while others are in private ownership or administered by trusts.

== Listed buildings by grade ==
- Grade I listed buildings in Staffordshire
- Grade II* listed buildings in Cannock Chase (district)
- Grade II* listed buildings in East Staffordshire
- Grade II* listed buildings in Lichfield (district)
- Grade II* listed buildings in Newcastle-under-Lyme (borough)
- Grade II* listed buildings in South Staffordshire
- Grade II* listed buildings in Stafford (borough)
- Grade II* listed buildings in Staffordshire Moorlands
- Grade II* listed buildings in Stoke-on-Trent
- Grade II* listed buildings in Tamworth (borough)

== Listed buildings by civil parish or unparished area ==
=== Cannock Chase ===
- Listed buildings in Brereton and Ravenhill
- Listed buildings in Brindley Heath
- Listed buildings in Cannock
- Listed buildings in Heath Hayes and Wimblebury
- Listed buildings in Hednesford
- Listed buildings in Norton Canes
- Listed buildings in Rugeley

=== City of Stoke-on-Trent ===
- Listed buildings in Stoke-on-Trent

=== East Staffordshire ===
- Listed buildings in Abbots Bromley
- Listed buildings in Anglesey, Staffordshire
- Listed buildings in Anslow
- Listed buildings in Barton-under-Needwood
- Listed buildings in Blithfield
- Listed buildings in Branston, Staffordshire
- Listed buildings in Burton, Staffordshire (civil parish)
- Listed buildings in Burton upon Trent
- Listed buildings in Croxden
- Listed buildings in Denstone
- Listed buildings in Draycott in the Clay
- Listed buildings in Dunstall
- Listed buildings in Ellastone
- Listed buildings in Hanbury, Staffordshire
- Listed buildings in Hoar Cross
- Listed buildings in Horninglow and Eton
- Listed buildings in Kingstone, Staffordshire
- Listed buildings in Leigh, Staffordshire
- Listed buildings in Marchington
- Listed buildings in Mayfield, Staffordshire
- Listed buildings in Newborough, Staffordshire
- Listed buildings in Okeover
- Listed buildings in Outwoods, East Staffordshire
- Listed buildings in Ramshorn
- Listed buildings in Rocester
- Listed buildings in Rolleston on Dove
- Listed buildings in Shobnall
- Listed buildings in Stanton, Staffordshire
- Listed buildings in Stapenhill
- Listed buildings in Stretton, East Staffordshire
- Listed buildings in Tatenhill
- Listed buildings in Tutbury
- Listed buildings in Uttoxeter
- Listed buildings in Uttoxeter Rural
- Listed buildings in Winshill
- Listed buildings in Wootton, Staffordshire
- Listed buildings in Wychnor
- Listed buildings in Yoxall

=== Lichfield ===
- Listed buildings in Alrewas
- Listed buildings in Armitage with Handsacre
- Listed buildings in Burntwood
- Listed buildings in Clifton Campville
- Listed buildings in Colton, Staffordshire
- Listed buildings in Curborough and Elmhurst
- Listed buildings in Drayton Bassett
- Listed buildings in Edingale
- Listed buildings in Elford
- Listed buildings in Farewell and Chorley
- Listed buildings in Fazeley
- Listed buildings in Fisherwick
- Listed buildings in Fradley and Streethay
- Listed buildings in Hammerwich
- Listed buildings in Hamstall Ridware
- Listed buildings in Harlaston
- Listed buildings in Hints, Staffordshire
- Listed buildings in Kings Bromley
- Listed buildings in Lichfield
- Listed buildings in Longdon, Staffordshire
- Listed buildings in Mavesyn Ridware
- Listed buildings in Shenstone, Staffordshire
- Listed buildings in Swinfen and Packington
- Listed buildings in Thorpe Constantine
- Listed buildings in Wall, Staffordshire
- Listed buildings in Weeford
- Listed buildings in Whittington, Staffordshire
- Listed buildings in Wigginton and Hopwas

=== Newcastle-under-Lyme ===
- Listed buildings in Audley Rural
- Listed buildings in Balterley
- Listed buildings in Betley
- Listed buildings in Chapel and Hill Chorlton
- Listed buildings in Keele
- Listed buildings in Kidsgrove
- Listed buildings in Loggerheads, Staffordshire
- Listed buildings in Madeley, Staffordshire
- Listed buildings in Maer, Staffordshire
- Listed buildings in Newcastle-under-Lyme
- Listed buildings in Silverdale, Staffordshire
- Listed buildings in Whitmore, Staffordshire

=== South Staffordshire ===
- Listed buildings in Acton Trussell, Bednall and Teddesley Hay
- Listed buildings in Bobbington
- Listed buildings in Brewood and Coven
- Listed buildings in Blymhill and Weston-under-Lizard
- Listed buildings in Cheslyn Hay
- Listed buildings in Codsall
- Listed buildings in Coppenhall
- Listed buildings in Dunston, Staffordshire
- Listed buildings in Enville, Staffordshire
- Listed buildings in Essington
- Listed buildings in Featherstone, Staffordshire
- Listed buildings in Hatherton, Staffordshire
- Listed buildings in Hilton, South Staffordshire
- Listed buildings in Himley
- Listed buildings in Kinver
- Listed buildings in Lapley, Stretton and Wheaton Aston
- Listed buildings in Lower Penn
- Listed buildings in Pattingham and Patshull
- Listed buildings in Penkridge
- Listed buildings in Perton
- Listed buildings in Saredon
- Listed buildings in Shareshill
- Listed buildings in Swindon, Staffordshire
- Listed buildings in Trysull and Seisdon
- Listed buildings in Wombourne

=== Stafford ===
- Listed buildings in Adbaston
- Listed buildings in Barlaston
- Listed buildings in Berkswich
- Listed buildings in Bradley, Staffordshire
- Listed buildings in Brocton, Staffordshire
- Listed buildings in Chebsey
- Listed buildings in Church Eaton
- Listed buildings in Colwich, Staffordshire
- Listed buildings in Creswell, Staffordshire
- Listed buildings in Doxey
- Listed buildings in Eccleshall
- Listed buildings in Ellenhall
- Listed buildings in Forton, Staffordshire
- Listed buildings in Fradswell
- Listed buildings in Fulford, Staffordshire
- Listed buildings in Gayton, Staffordshire
- Listed buildings in Gnosall
- Listed buildings in Haughton, Staffordshire
- Listed buildings in High Offley
- Listed buildings in Hilderstone
- Listed buildings in Hixon, Staffordshire
- Listed buildings in Ingestre
- Listed buildings in Marston, Milwich
- Listed buildings in Milwich
- Listed buildings in Norbury, Staffordshire
- Listed buildings in Ranton, Staffordshire
- Listed buildings in Salt and Enson
- Listed buildings in Sandon and Burston
- Listed buildings in Seighford
- Listed buildings in Stafford (Central Area)
- Listed buildings in Stafford (Outer Area)
- Listed buildings in Standon, Staffordshire
- Listed buildings in Stone, Staffordshire
- Listed buildings in Stone Rural
- Listed buildings in Stowe-by-Chartley
- Listed buildings in Swynnerton
- Listed buildings in Tixall
- Listed buildings in Weston, Staffordshire

=== Staffordshire Moorlands ===
- Listed buildings in Alton, Staffordshire
- Listed buildings in Alstonefield
- Listed buildings in Bagnall, Staffordshire
- Listed buildings in Biddulph
- Listed buildings in Blore with Swinscoe
- Listed buildings in Bradnop
- Listed buildings in Brown Edge
- Listed buildings in Butterton
- Listed buildings in Caverswall
- Listed buildings in Cheadle, Staffordshire
- Listed buildings in Checkley
- Listed buildings in Cheddleton
- Listed buildings in Consall
- Listed buildings in Cotton, Staffordshire
- Listed buildings in Dilhorne
- Listed buildings in Draycott in the Moors
- Listed buildings in Endon and Stanley
- Listed buildings in Farley, Staffordshire
- Listed buildings in Fawfieldhead
- Listed buildings in Forsbrook
- Listed buildings in Grindon, Staffordshire
- Listed buildings in Heathylee
- Listed buildings in Heaton, Staffordshire
- Listed buildings in Hollinsclough
- Listed buildings in Horton, Staffordshire
- Listed buildings in Ipstones
- Listed buildings in Ilam, Staffordshire
- Listed buildings in Kingsley, Staffordshire
- Listed buildings in Leek, Staffordshire
- Listed buildings in Leekfrith
- Listed buildings in Longnor, Staffordshire
- Listed buildings in Longsdon
- Listed buildings in Oakamoor
- Listed buildings in Onecote
- Listed buildings in Quarnford
- Listed buildings in Rushton, Staffordshire
- Listed buildings in Sheen, Staffordshire
- Listed buildings in Tittesworth
- Listed buildings in Warslow and Elkstones
- Listed buildings in Waterhouses, Staffordshire
- Listed buildings in Werrington, Staffordshire
- Listed buildings in Wetton, Staffordshire

=== Tamworth ===
- Listed buildings in Tamworth, Staffordshire
