= Staffordshire Moorlands District Council elections =

Local government elections in Staffordshire, England

Staffordshire Moorlands District Council elections are held every four years. Staffordshire Moorlands District Council is the local authority for the non-metropolitan district of Staffordshire Moorlands in Staffordshire, England. Since the last boundary changes in 2003, 56 councillors have been elected from 27 wards.

== Council elections ==
- 1973 Staffordshire Moorlands District Council election
- 1976 Staffordshire Moorlands District Council election (New ward boundaries)
- 1979 Staffordshire Moorlands District Council election
- 1983 Staffordshire Moorlands District Council election
- 1987 Staffordshire Moorlands District Council election
- 1991 Staffordshire Moorlands District Council election (District boundary changes took place but the number of seats remained the same)
- 1995 Staffordshire Moorlands District Council election (District boundary changes took place but the number of seats remained the same)
- 1999 Staffordshire Moorlands District Council election
- 2003 Staffordshire Moorlands District Council election (New ward boundaries)
- 2007 Staffordshire Moorlands District Council election
- 2011 Staffordshire Moorlands District Council election
- 2015 Staffordshire Moorlands District Council election
- 2019 Staffordshire Moorlands District Council election
- 2023 Staffordshire Moorlands District Council election

== Results maps ==
2003 results map

2007 results map

2011 results map

2015 results map

2019 results map

2023 results map

== By-elections ==
=== 1995-1999 ===
Biddulph North By-Election 4 September 1997
Party	Candidate	Votes	%	±%
Labour		262	40.7	+3.8
Conservative		180	28.0	+28.0
Liberal Democrats		130	20.2	+7.4
Ratepayer		72	11.2	−5.2
Majority		82	12.7	
Turnout		644	14.3	
Labour hold		Swing		

Leek NE By-Election 30 October 1997
Party	Candidate	Votes	%	±%
Labour		386	58.6	+8.6
Conservative		125	19.0	+9.0
Ratepayer		85	12.9	−3.4
Liberal Democrats		61	9.3	+4.7
Majority		261	39.6	
Turnout		657		
Labour hold		Swing		

Cheadle NE By-Election 12 February 1998
Party	Candidate	Votes	%	±%
Ratepayer		315	50.1	+19.0
Labour		195	31.0	−16.3
Conservative		119	18.9	+18.9
Majority		120	19.1	
Turnout		629	26.3	
Independent gain from Labour		Swing		

Biddulph South By-Election 30 April 1998
Party	Candidate	Votes	%	±%
Liberal Democrats		617	55.7	+20.8
Labour		382	35.0	−13.7
Independent		108	9.8	−6.5
Majority		235	20.7	
Turnout		1,107	31.5	
Liberal Democrats hold		Swing		

=== 1999-2003 ===
Biddulph East By-Election 6 April 2000
Party	Candidate	Votes	%	±%
Labour		465	72.3	−3.4
Liberal Democrats		110	17.1	+4.7
Conservative		68	10.5	−1.0
Majority		355	55.2	
Turnout		643	19.4	
Labour hold		Swing		

Biddulph South By-Election 8 February 2001
Party	Candidate	Votes	%	±%
Liberal Democrats		506	54.1	+1.9
Labour		345	36.9	+4.1
Conservative		84	9.0	+9.0
Majority		161	17.2	
Turnout		935	26.2	
Liberal Democrats gain from Labour		Swing		

Leek South East By-Election 30 May 2002
Party	Candidate	Votes	%	±%
Labour		357	32.0	+3.4
Conservative		351	31.4	+2.9
Ratepayer		287	25.7	−8.9
Liberal Democrats		122	10.9	+2.6
Majority		6	0.6	
Turnout		1,117	27.0	
Labour gain from Independent		Swing		

=== 2003-2007 ===
Biddulph East By-Election 29 July 2004
Party	Candidate	Votes	%	±%
Labour	Madelaine Lovatt	501	79.4	
Liberal Democrats	Brian Lewis	130	20.6	
Majority		371	58.8	
Turnout		631	14.4	
Labour hold		Swing		

Biddulph North By-Election 9 December 2004
Party	Candidate	Votes	%	±%
Independent		320	41.4	+11.4
Labour		269	34.8	+15.7
Ratepayer		103	13.3	−3.1
Liberal Democrats		81	10.5	+0.0
Majority		51	6.6	
Turnout		773	17.5	
Independent gain from Conservative		Swing		

Werrington By-Election 9 March 2006
Party	Candidate	Votes	%	±%
Conservative	Jeffrey Bass	265	27.2	−27.5
Labour	Yvonne Ahmad	206	21.1	−24.2
Liberal Democrats	Jane Leaper	196	20.1	+20.1
BNP	John Burgess	162	16.6	+16.6
Independent	Austin Hanchard	83	8.5	+8.5
Independent	Trevor Austin	34	3.2	+3.2
UKIP	Michael Critchlow	29	3.0	+3.0
Majority		59	6.1	
Turnout		975	34.0	
Conservative hold		Swing		

Cheadle West By-Election 13 July 2006
Party	Candidate	Votes	%	±%
Conservative	Alan Banks	354	59.7	+14.8
Ratepayer	Ernest Vernon	239	40.3	+28.7
Majority		115	19.4	
Turnout		593	15.2	
Conservative hold		Swing		

=== 2007-2011 ===
Leek East By-Election 19 March 2009
Party	Candidate	Votes	%	±%
Conservative		452	38.7	−7.6
Liberal Democrats	Roy Gregg	238	20.4	+20.4
Independent		197	16.9	+16.9
Staffordshire Independent Group		189	16.2	+16.2
Green		91	7.8	+7.8
Majority		214	18.3	
Turnout		1,167		
Conservative hold		Swing		

=== 2011-2015 ===
Leek North By-Election 9 February 2012
Party	Candidate	Votes	%	±%
Labour	Charlotte Atkins	514	54.9	+16.9
UKIP	Alex Povey	188	20.1	−13.7
Conservative	Bob Bestwick	178	19.0	−1.6
Moorlands Democratic Alliance	Brian Pointon	33	3.5	+3.5
Liberal Democrats	Roy Gregg	24	2.6	+2.6
Majority		326	34.8	
Turnout		937		
Labour gain from UKIP		Swing		

Leek North By-Election 2 May 2013
Party	Candidate	Votes	%	±%
Labour	Darren Price	397	32.3	+0.3
UKIP	Matthew Cooper	347	28.2	−5.6
Conservative	Bob Bestwick	260	21.1	+0.5
Moorlands Democratic Alliance	Maureen Motum	203	16.5	+16.5
Liberal Democrats	Roy Gregg	23	1.9	+1.9
Majority		50	4.1	
Turnout		1,230		
Labour hold		Swing		

Cellarhead By-Election 20 March 2014
Party	Candidate	Votes	%	±%
Conservative	Barbara Hughes	178	32.5	−12.3
Labour	Jocelyn Morrison	132	24.1	+24.1
Staffordshire Independent Group	Jean Hodgetts	119	21.8	−33.4
UKIP	Alex Povey	105	19.2	+19.2
Liberal Democrats	Phil Routledge	13	2.4	+2.4
Majority		46	8.4	
Turnout		547		
Conservative gain from Staffordshire Independent Group		Swing		

=== 2015-2019 ===
Leek East by-election 20 July 2017
Party	Candidate	Votes	%	±%
Labour	Darren Price	505	45.0	
Conservative	Roy Denis Tomkinson	325	28.9	
Independent	Nick Sheldon	219	19.5	
Liberal Democrats	Roy William Gregg	74	6.6	
Majority		180	16.0	
Turnout				
Labour gain from Conservative		Swing		

Leek West by-election 22 March 2018
Party	Candidate	Votes	%	±%
Labour	Bill Cawley	487	42.9	+23.6
Conservative	James Aberley	370	32.6	+0.6
Liberal Democrats	George Herbert	219	19.2	+8.7
Independent	Stephen Wales	61	5.4	+5.4
Majority		117	10.3	
Turnout		1,137	30.9	
Labour gain from Conservative		Swing		

=== 2019-2023 ===
Cheadle North East by-election 6 May 2021
Party	Candidate	Votes	%	±%
Conservative	Stephen Ellis	308	47.2	+47.2
Independent	Liz Whitehouse	163	25.0	+25.0
Labour	Debra Gratton	117	17.9	−4.3
Independent	Paulette Upton	33	5.1	−18.9
Green	Dan Mayers	31	4.8	−6.8
Majority		145	22.2	
Turnout		652		
Conservative gain from Independent		Swing		

Cheadle South East by-election 6 May 2021
Party	Candidate	Votes	%	±%
Conservative	Peter Jackson	359	42.4	+19.8
Labour	Liz Haines	206	24.3	−1.6
Independent	Jamie Evans	153	18.1	+18.1
Independent	Colin Pearce	87	10.3	+10.3
Independent	Alan Thomas	24	2.8	+2.8
Green	Daniella Vickerstaff	18	2.1	+2.1
Majority		153	18.1	
Turnout		847		
Conservative gain from Independent		Swing		

Cheadle South East by-election 5 May 2022
Party	Candidate	Votes	%	±%
Conservative	Zenobia Routledge	348	43.0	+20.4
Labour	Matthew Spooner	325	40.1	+14.2
Independent	Abigail Wilkinson	137	16.9	−12.0
Majority		23	2.8	
Turnout		810		
Conservative gain from Independent		Swing		

Biddulph West by-election 19 January 2023 (2 seats)
Party	Candidate	Votes	%	±%
Labour	Charlie Smith	364		
Labour	Dave Proudlove	288		
Independent	Abigail Wilkinson	226		
Conservative	Rathi Pragasam	185		
Independent	Alistair McLoughlin	154		
Green	Ian Waite	61		
Labour gain from Conservative		Swing		
Labour gain from Conservative		Swing		

=== 2023-2027 ===
Cheddleton by-election 12 November 2026
Party	Candidate	Votes	%	±%
Reform	Su Beardmore	471	37.8	+37.8
Conservative	Rob Bateman	327	26.3	−5.6
Labour	Martin Sadler	213	17.1	−10.5
Independent	Sue Rogers	156	12.5	+12.5
Restore	Karen Pickering	55	4.4	+4.4
Green	Matthew Frith	23	1.8	−11.1
Majority		144	11.6	
Turnout		1,245		
Reform gain from Conservative		Swing		
