= Listed buildings in Burton upon Trent =

Burton upon Trent consists of the following civil parishes containing listed buildings.

- Listed buildings in Anglesey, Staffordshire
- Listed buildings in Burton (civil parish)
- Listed buildings in Horninglow and Eton
- Listed buildings in Outwoods, East Staffordshire
- Listed buildings in Shobnall
- Listed buildings in Stapenhill
- Listed buildings in Stretton, East Staffordshire
- Listed buildings in Winshill
