= 2015 Staffordshire Moorlands District Council election =

2015 UK local government election

Conservative Labour Liberal Democrat UKIP Moorlands Democratic Alliance Independent

The 2015 Staffordshire Moorlands District Council election took place on 7 May 2015 to elect members of Staffordshire Moorlands District Council in England. This was on the same day as other local elections.

After the election, the composition of the council was:

- Conservative 31
- Independent 8
- Labour 7
- Liberal Democrat 2
- Moorlands Democratic Alliance 2
- UKIP 2

== Ward results ==
The candidates highlighted in bold were elected to each ward.

Alton (1 seat)
Party	Candidate	Votes	%	±%
Conservative	**Arthur Sylvester Forrester**	666	80	
Labour	Paul Thomas Powner	200	20	
Majority		466	53.8	+266
Turnout		866	75.6	+19.33
Conservative **hold**				

Bagnall and Stanley (1 seat)
Party	Candidate	Votes	%	±%
Conservative	**Sybil Evelyn Ralphs**	742	75	
Labour	Deborah Alison Price	117	12	
Green	Sarah Elizabeth Colwell	64	6.5	
Liberal Democrats	David Teasdale	61	6.2	
Majority		625	63.5	+0.8
Turnout		984	70.29	+21.51
Conservative **hold**				

Biddulph East (3 seats)
Party	Candidate	Votes	%	±%
Labour	**Kevin James Jackson**	1366	25.9	
Labour	**Madelaine Mary Lovatt**	1282	24.2	
Labour	**Jeanette Ann Walley**	1180	22.3	
Independent	Jill Salt	734	13.9	
UKIP	Lisa Salt	723	13.7	
Turnout		5285	54.17	+24.56
Labour **hold**				

Biddulph Moor (1 seat)
Party	Candidate	Votes	%	±%
Independent	**John Jones**	544	54.1	
Independent	Hal Wilson	214	21.3	
Conservative	Agnes Gronkiewicz	162	16.1	
Labour	Robert Thomas Arthur Whilding	85	8.4	
Majority		330	32.8	−18.9
Turnout		1005	72.35	+24.7
Independent **hold**				

Biddulph North (3 seats)
Party	Candidate	Votes	%	±%
Independent	**Jim Davis**	1563	26.3	
Independent	**Tony Hall**	1556	26.1	
Independent	**Andrew Hart**	1355	22.8	
Labour	Eileen Sylvia Rushton	861	14.4	
Liberal Democrats	Dave Boothroyd	604	10.1	
Turnout		5939	70.84	27.84
Independent **hold**				

Biddulph South (1 seat)
Party	Candidate	Votes	%	±%
Liberal Democrats	**John Phillip Redfern**	408	43.5	
Labour	Gavin Carl Wood	279	29.7	
Independent	Ken Harper	252	26.8	
Majority		156	16.6	+15.6
Turnout		939	67.52	+21.34
Liberal Democrats **hold**				

Biddulph West (3 seats)
Party	Candidate	Votes	%	±%
Independent	**Hilda Mary Sheldon**	1306	48.5	
Conservative	**Ian Sinnett Lawson**	1052	39.1	
Labour	**Christopher Wood**	984	36.6	
Independent	Elaine Elizabeth Baddeley	866	32.1	
Labour	Nigel Richard Yates	789	23.3	
Green	Gareth John Whalley	382	14.2	
Turnout		2960	62.4	+25.52
Conservative **gain** from Independent		Swing		

Brown Edge and Endon (3 seats)
Party	Candidate	Votes	%	±%
Conservative	**Linda Doreen Lea**	1180	40.3	
Conservative	**Geoff Bond**	1112	38.0	
Liberal Democrats	**Christina Rita Jebb**	1101	37.6	
Conservative	Joe Porter	1067	36.4	
Liberal Democrats	Henry Walter Gladwyn Jebb	743	25.4	
Liberal Democrats	Danielle Maria Spooner	572	19.5	
Labour	Andrew Stuart Cunningham Church	550	18.8	
Labour	Nick Revell	585	20.0	
Labour	Gareth Richard Taylor	410	14.0	
Green	Brian Geoffrey Smith	243	8.3	
Moorlands Democratic Alliance	Andy Wragg	112	3.8	−3.0
Turnout		2926	72.02	+21.77
Conservative **gain** from Liberal Democrats		Swing		

Caverswall (1 seat)
Party	Candidate	Votes	%	±%
Conservative	**Paul John Roberts**	585	63.0	+0.3
Moorlands Democratic Alliance	Dave Bateman	343	37.0	−0.9
Majority		585	63.0	+38.8
Turnout		928	67.31	+27.63
Conservative **hold**		Swing	0.75	

Cheadle North East (2 seats)
Party	Candidate	Votes	%	±%
Conservative	**Julie Dawn Bull**	593	37.0	
UKIP	**Peter Wilkinson**	515	32.2	
Conservative	Michael John Shirley	386	24.1	
Independent	Ian Tracy Whitehouse	378	23.6	
Labour	John Palfreyman	340	21.3	
UKIP	Thomas Peter Wilkinson	228	14.25	
Independent	Phil Routledge	182	11.4	
Moorlands Democratic Alliance	Ian William Plant	142	8.9	
Moorlands Democratic Alliance	Sue Walley	93	5.8	
Turnout		1600	56.6	+22.3
Conservative **hold**				

Cheadle South East (2 seats)
Party	Candidate	Votes	%	±%
Independent	**Richard Alcock**	702	39.4	
Conservative	**Deb Grocott**	540	30.3	
Independent	Peter James Elkin	495	27.8	
Conservative	Brian Slaney	486	27.3	
Labour	Jan Hale	476	26.7	
Moorlands Democratic Alliance	Neil Plant	269	15.0	
Turnout		1782	60.3	+22.5
Conservative **gain** from Independent		Swing		

Cheadle West (3 seats)
Party	Candidate	Votes	%	±%
Conservative	**Stephen Andrew Ellis**	1146	53.4	
Conservative	**Alan Banks**	1059	49.3	
Conservative	**Peter Mark Jackson**	927	43.1	
Labour	Sam Hale	648	30.2	
Moorlands Democratic Alliance	Ray Wood	605	28.2	
Moorlands Democratic Alliance	Ronald Gordon Locker	539	25.1	
Labour	Joe Baker	511	23.8	
Labour	Alan Geoffrey Baker	501	23.3	
Liberal Democrats	Philip Alvin Silk	211	9.8	
Turnout		2461	59.6	+22.6
Conservative **gain** from Moorlands Democratic Alliance		Swing		

Checkley (3 seats)
Party	Candidate	Votes	%	±%
Conservative	**Mark Anthony Deaville**	1739	55.7	
Conservative	**Colin Pearce**	1604	51.4	
Conservative	**David Kingsley Trigger**	1293	41.4	
Labour	Jane Palfreyman	712	22.8	
Labour	Rosie Hale	667	21.4	
Moorlands Democratic Alliance	David Wright	419	13.4	
Turnout		3121	67.1	+26.2
Conservative **hold**				

Cheddleton (3 seats)
Party	Candidate	Votes	%	±%
Conservative	**Michael Philip Worthington**	1622	52.7	
Conservative	**Michael Thomas Bowen**	1527	49.6	
Conservative	**Salvino Scalise**	1388	45.1	
Labour	Mahfooz Ahmad	987	32.1	
Green	Paul Mark Fenton	744	24.2	
Moorlands Democratic Alliance	Harold Rensburgh Jennings	737	23.9	
Turnout		3079	69.3	+24.98
Conservative **gain** from Labour		Swing		

Churnet (2 seats)
Party	Candidate	Votes	%	±%
Independent	**Ivor John Lucas**	960	54.0	
Conservative	**Elsie Fallows**	735	41.3	
Conservative	Bryan Andrew Bull	662	37.2	
Turnout		1778	67.3	+24.5
Independent **gain** from Conservative		Swing		

Forsbrook (3 seats)
Party	Candidate	Votes	%	±%
Conservative	**Ian James Herdman**	1141	40.3	
Conservative	**Keith Flunder**	989	34.9	
UKIP	**Abigail Laura Wilkinson**	889	31.4	
Independent	Gillian Burton	823	29.0	
Labour	Alan Edward Wilson	784	27.7	
Moorlands Democratic Alliance	Christine Rose Hopley	636	22.5	
Moorlands Democratic Alliance	Frank John Hopley	603	21.3	
Turnout		2830	67.3	+29.3
UKIP **gain** from Independent		Swing		

Hamps Valley (1 seat)
Party	Candidate	Votes	%	±%
Conservative	**Edwin Thomas John Wain**	726	64.2	
Moorlands Democratic Alliance	Steven Ratcliffe	234	20.7	
Labour	Terry Riley	171	15.1	
Majority		492	43.5	−3.5
Turnout		1131	76.5	+18.0
Conservative **hold**		Swing		

Horton (1 seat)
Party	Candidate	Votes	%	±%
Conservative	**Norma Hawkins**	951	78.9	
Labour	Lytton Page	234	19.4	
Majority		717	59.5	+37.6
Turnout		1205	74.1	+22.3
Conservative **hold**		Swing		

Ipstones (1 seat)
Party	Candidate	Votes	%	±%
Moorlands Democratic Alliance	**Linda Ann Malyon**	615	52.0	
Conservative	Brian Warrington	403	34.1	
Labour	Philip James Barks	156	13.2	
Majority		212	17.9	−1.8
Turnout		1183	76.42	+17.51
Moorlands Democratic Alliance **hold**		Swing		

Leek East (3 seats)
Party	Candidate	Votes	%	±%
Conservative	**Rebecca Done**	997	38.6	
Conservative	**Brian Charles Johnson**	866	33.5	
Moorlands Democratic Alliance	**Pamela Wood**	734	28.4	
Labour	Gwen Gledhill	694	26.9	
Conservative	Roy Denis Tomkinson	659	25.5	
Labour	Bill Cawley	640	24.8	
UKIP	Michael Anthony Mothershaw	537	20.8	
Moorlands Democratic Alliance	Andrew William Easom	519	20.1	
Green	Megan Ruth Walmsley-Pitts	407	15.8	
Liberal Democrats	Judy Gregg	211	8.2	
Turnout		2583	63.87	+23.85
Conservative **gain** from Moorlands Democratic Alliance		Swing		

Leek North (3 seats)
Party	Candidate	Votes	%	±%
Labour	**Charlotte Atkins**	1275	52.5	
Labour	**Margaret Ann Lovatt**	1130	46.5	
Conservative	**Dani Ogden**	938	38.6	
Labour	Darren Anthony Price	772	31.8	
Green	Keith Robert Naldrett	447	18.4	
Turnout		2428	57.1	+21.4
Conservative **gain** from UKIP		Swing		

Leek South (3 seats)
Party	Candidate	Votes	%	±%
Conservative	**Gail Karen Lynn Lockett**	850	30.9	
Labour	**Mike Gledhill**	809	29.4	
Independent	**Keith Harrison**	789	28.7	
Labour	Susan Coleman	784	28.5	
Conservative	John Povey	779	28.3	
Labour	Keith Hoptroff	698	25.4	
Conservative	Roy Molson	682	24.8	
Moorlands Democratic Alliance	Roger Adams	537	19.5	
Moorlands Democratic Alliance	Neil Kirby	401	14.6	
Green	Francisco Philip Davies	384	14.0	
Liberal Democrats	Mike Ottewell	171	6.2	
Turnout		2749	61.44	+23.41
Labour **gain** from Conservative		Swing		

Leek West (3 seats)
Party	Candidate	Votes	%	±%
Conservative	**Ben Emery**	1157	43.4	
Conservative	**Robert Warrington Plant**	994	37.3	
Conservative	**Neal Robert Podmore**	921	34.5	
Labour	Susan Webster	697	26.7	
Moorlands Democratic Alliance	Andy Machin	506	19.0	
Moorlands Democratic Alliance	Brian Hall	490	18.4	
Green	Mark Sidebotham	400	15.0	
Liberal Democrats	Roy Gregg	380	14.3	
Independent	Jason Gregory Banks	293	11.0	
Independent	Brian Harry Pointon	184	6.9	
Turnout		2665	69.7	+25.6
Conservative **gain** from Liberal Democrats		Swing		

Manifold (1 seat)
Party	Candidate	Votes	%	±%
Conservative	**Teresa Riley**	888	77.8	
UKIP	Gary William Salt	204	17.9	
Majority		684	59.9	+10.7
Turnout		1142	75.53	+22.63
Conservative **hold**		Swing		

Werrington (2 seats)
Party	Candidate	Votes	%	±%
Conservative	**David Shaw**	1017	55.9	
Conservative	**Ross David Ward**	697	38.3	
Staffordshire Independent Group	Lisa Martin	554	30.5	
Labour	Jocelyn Anne Morrison	487	26.8	
Labour	Doreen Jones	471	25.9	
Turnout		1817	68.21	+27.5
Conservative **gain** from Staffordshire Independent Group		Swing		
