= 2011 Staffordshire Moorlands District Council election =

2011 UK local government election

Conservative Labour Liberal Democrat UKIP Moorlands Democratic Alliance Staffordshire Independent Group Independent

The 2011 Staffordshire Moorlands District Council election took place on 5 May 2011 to elect members of Staffordshire Moorlands District Council in England. This was on the same day as other local elections.

After the election, the composition of the council was:

- Conservative 26
- Independent 10
- Labour 7
- Moorlands Democratic Alliance 5
- Liberal Democrat 4
- Staffordshire Independent Group 3
- UKIP 1

== Ward results ==
The candidates highlighted in bold were elected to each ward.

Alton (1 seat)
Party	Candidate	Votes	%	±%
Conservative	**Arthur Sylvester Forrester**	410	64.8	
Moorlands Democratic Alliance	Julie Downie	210	33.2	
Majority		200	32.3	−143
Turnout		633	56.27	+11.2
Conservative **hold**		Swing		

Bagnall and Stanley (1 seat)
Party	Candidate	Votes	%	±%
Conservative	**Sybil Evelyn Ralphs**	492	74.5	
Liberal Democrats	David Teasdale	88	33.4	
Moorlands Democratic Alliance	Andrew John Machin	64	9.7	
Majority		404	61.2	−8
Turnout		660	48.78	+1.3
Conservative **hold**		Swing		

Biddulph East (3 seats)
Party	Candidate	Votes	%	±%
Labour	**Kevin James Jackson**	866	63.3	
Labour	**Madelaine Mary Lovatt**	846	61.8	
Labour	**Jeanette Ann Walley**	814	59.5	
Conservative	John Rushton	324	23.7	
Conservative	Ian Lawson	311	22.7	
Liberal Democrats	Brian Alan Lewis	169	12.3	
Turnout		1369	29.61	−29.2
Labour **hold**		Swing		

Biddulph Moor (1 seat)
Party	Candidate	Votes	%	±%
Independent	**John Jones**	468	71.1	
Conservative	Margaret Rose Leason	141	21.4	
Independent	Ronald Edward Sherwin	24	3.6	
Majority		327	49.7	−162
Turnout		658	47.7	+1.4
Independent **gain** from Liberal Democrats		Swing		

Biddulph North (3 seats)
Party	Candidate	Votes	%	±%
Independent	**Derek Anthony Hall**	1007	55.3	
Independent	**James Edward Davies**	921	20.6	
Independent	**Harold Andrew Hart**	844	46.3	
Conservative	Eileen Cox	624	34.3	
Moorlands Democratic Alliance	Alex Johnathan Povey	439	24.1	
Moorlands Democratic Alliance	Alan James Hague	317	17.4	
Turnout		1821	43.0	+14.5
Independent **hold**		Swing		

Biddulph South (1 seat)
Party	Candidate	Votes	%	±%
Liberal Democrats	**John Phillip Redfern**	256	39.6	
Conservative	Matthew Alan Tolley	250	38.7	
Moorlands Democratic Alliance	Nigel Richard Yates	125	19.3	
Majority		6	0.9	−61
Turnout		646	46.2	−1.5
Liberal Democrats **hold**		Swing		

Biddulph West (3 seats)
Party	Candidate	Votes	%	±%
Independent	**Hilda Mary Sheldon**	904	56.7	
Labour	**Christopher Wood**	593	37.2	
Independent	**Elaine Elizabeth Baddeley**	584	36.6	
Moorlands Democratic Alliance	Terence Cyril Gibson	441	27.7	
Independent	Gerald Stuart Adams	410	25.7	
Conservative	Michael Ian Maryon	290	18.2	
Liberal Democrats	David Edward Boothroyd	137	8.6	
Liberal Democrats	Mark Edward Asquith	89	5.6	
Liberal Democrats	Deirdre Ann deGoldthorp Hanson	87	5.5	
Turnout		1594	36.9	+9.2
Labour **gain** from Independent		Swing		

Brown Edge and Endon (3 seats)
Party	Candidate	Votes	%	±%
Liberal Democrats	**Christina Rita Jebb**	932	46.3	
Liberal Democrats	**Henry Walter Gladwyn Jebb**	776	38.5	
Conservative	**Barnaby Williams**	751	37.3	
Conservative	Richard Stubbs	637	31.6	
Liberal Democrats	Linda Doreen Lea	625	31.0	
Conservative	Martin John Pointon	614	30.5	
Labour	Paul Thomas Powner	364	18.0	
Moorlands Democratic Alliance	Dennis Salt	187	9.3	
Moorlands Democratic Alliance	Andrew John Wragg	138	6.8	
Turnout		2015	50.3	+11.9
Conservative **gain** from Liberal Democrats		Swing		

Caverswall (1 seat)
Party	Candidate	Votes	%	±%
Conservative	**Paul John Roberts**	346	61.2	
Moorlands Democratic Alliance	William David Bateman	211	37.3	
Majority		135	23.9	+13
Turnout		565	39.7	+4.3
Conservative **hold**		Swing		

Cellarhead (2 seats)
Party	Candidate	Votes	%	±%
Staffordshire Independent Group	**May Ethel Day**	533	50.0	
Conservative	**Anthony Mcnicol**	432	40.6	
Staffordshire Independent Group	Jean Millicent Hodgetts	393	36.9	
Conservative	Alfred John White	358	33.6	
Turnout		1064	40.7	+4.6
Staffordshire Independent Group **gain** from Conservative				

Cheadle North East (2 seats)
Party	Candidate	Votes	%	±%
Conservative	**Julie Dawn Bull**	283	30.0	
Moorlands Democratic Alliance	**Ian Tracy Whitehouse**	262	27.8	
Conservative	Helen Margaret Lingard	254	27.0	
Moorlands Democratic Alliance	Margaret Jane Locker	212	22.5	
Labour	John Palfreyman	176	18.7	
Conservative	Peter Wilkinson	161	17.0	
Independent	Ivor John Lucas	157	16.7	
Liberal Democrats	Phillip Richmond Routledge	70	7.4	
Turnout		942	34.3	+5.7
Moorlands Democratic Alliance **gain** from Conservative				

Cheadle South East (2 seats)
Party	Candidate	Votes	%	±%
Independent	**Frederick Richard Alcock**	518	47.7	
Independent	**Peter James Elkin**	305	28.1	
Conservative	Ian Menzies Lingard	296	27.3	
Labour	Samuel Hale	263	24.2	
Independent	Adrian Higgins	155	14.3	
Independent	Gladys Hilda Ferguson	144	13.3	
Moorlands Democratic Alliance	Robert Price	76	7.0	
Liberal Democrats	Gregory Morris Williams	55	5.0	
Turnout		1085	37.82	+11.5
Independent **gain** from Conservative		Swing		

Cheadle West (3 seats)
Party	Candidate	Votes	%	±%
Conservative	**Stephen Andrew Ellis**	703	47.2	
Moorlands Democratic Alliance	**Ronald Gordon Locker**	586	39.4	
Conservative	**Alan Banks**	544	36.6	
Conservative	Peter Henry Warrillow	535	36.0	
Moorlands Democratic Alliance	Kenneth Riley	440	29.6	
Labour	Claire Louise Morrison	353	23.7	
Liberal Democrats	Philip Alvin Silk	191	12.8	
Turnout		1488	37.0	+10.3
Moorlands Democratic Alliance **gain** from Conservative				

Checkley (3 seats)
Party	Candidate	Votes	%	±%
Conservative	**Mark Anthony Deaville**	1010	54.7	
Conservative	**Colin William Pearce**	976		
Conservative	**David Kingsley Trigger**	811	52.8	
Independent	David Ball	487	26.4	
Labour	Jane Palfreyman	441	23.9	
Independent	Brian Christopher Evans	323	17.5	
Moorlands Democratic Alliance	Steven Dennis Buckley	301	16.3	
Moorlands Democratic Alliance	John Bevan	214	11.6	
Turnout		1847	40.9	+12.4
Conservative **hold**		Swing		

Cheddleton (3 seats)
Party	Candidate	Votes	%	±%
Conservative	**Michael Thomas Bowen**	864	45.1	
Conservative	**Michael Philip Worthington**	823	43.0	
Labour	**Mahfooz Ahmad**	646	33.8	
Independent	John Gareth Arnold	624	32.6	
Moorlands Democratic Alliance	Salvino Scalise	552	28.8	
Liberal Democrats	Nicholas John Brewin	285	14.9	
Turnout		1914	44.3	+7.6
Labour **gain** from Conservative		Swing		

Churnet (2 seats)
Party	Candidate	Votes	%	±%
Conservative	**Elsie Fallows**	539	48.9	
Conservative	**Josephine Barbara Clowes**	504	45.7	
Moorlands Democratic Alliance	Darren John Federici	351	31.8	
Moorlands Democratic Alliance	Paula Toal	222	20.1	
Turnout		1103	42.8	+9.3
Conservative **hold**		Swing		

Dane (1 seat)
Party	Candidate	Votes	%	±%
Conservative	**Christine Gillian Heath**	496	72.6	
Liberal Democrats	John Edward Ashworth	129	20	
Majority		367	56.8	+2
Turnout		646	51.3	+5.4
Conservative **hold**		Swing		

Forsbrook (3 seats)
Party	Candidate	Votes	%	±%
Independent	**Gillian Burton**	918	58.1	
Staffordshire Independent Group	**Frank John Hopley**	591	37.4	
Conservative	**Abigail Laura Wilkinson**	544	34.5	
Labour	Joanne Peta Lewis	489	31.0	
Independent	Paul Anthony Quinton	342	21.7	
Moorlands Democratic Alliance	Anthony Pemberton	284	18.0	
Turnout		1579	38.1	+14.2
Conservative **gain** from BNP		Swing		

Hamps Valley (1 seat)
Party	Candidate	Votes	%	±%
Conservative	**Edwin Thomas John Wain**	609	76.2	
Labour	Terence William Riley	219	27.4	
Majority		390	48.8	−68
Turnout		837	58.37	+3.2
Conservative **hold**		Swing		

Horton (1 seat)
Party	Candidate	Votes	%	±%
Conservative	**Norma Hawkins**	453	56.7	
Independent	Christopher James Rider	278	34.8	
Liberal Democrats	Margaret Mary Teasdale	62	7.8	
Majority		175	21.9	−214
Turnout		799	51.8	+6.8
Conservative **hold**		Swing		

Ipstones (1 seat)
Party	Candidate	Votes	%	±%
Moorlands Democratic Alliance	**Linda Ann Malyon**	599	67.4	
Conservative	Patrick Stimpson	281	31.6	
Majority		318	35.8	+290
Turnout		889	58.91	+6.4
Moorlands Democratic Alliance **gain** from Ratepayers (Staffordshire Moorlands)				

Leek East (3 seats)
Party	Candidate	Votes	%	±%
Moorlands Democratic Alliance	**Barry Trevor Cowie**	699	44.1	
Moorlands Democratic Alliance	**Pamela Wood**	697	44.0	
Conservative	**Brian Charles Johnson**	669	42.2	
Conservative	Arthur Ellis Rowlands	635	40.0	
Moorlands Democratic Alliance	Michael Reginald Cozens	607	38.3	
Conservative	Peter William Stanier	485	30.6	
Liberal Democrats	Judith Elizabeth Gregg	253	16.0	
Turnout		1584	40.0	+4.9
Moorlands Democratic Alliance **gain** from Conservative				

Leek North (3 seats)
Party	Candidate	Votes	%	±%
UKIP	**Stephen Frances Povey**	694	47.7	
Labour	**Margaret Ann Lovatt**	657	45.2	
Labour	**Sandra Jean Cooper**	527	36.2	
Conservative	Robert Allan Bestwick	423	29.1	
UKIP	Terry Wood	336	23.1	
Independent	Paul Anthony Robinson	277	19.1	
Conservative	James Chadwick	275	18.9	
Conservative	Keith Robert Walker	170	11.7	
Turnout		1454	35.8	+4.2
Labour **hold**		Swing		

Leek South (3 seats)
Party	Candidate	Votes	%	±%
Independent	**Keith Harrison**	670	40.1	
Conservative	**Edward Francis John Povey**	621	37.2	
Conservative	**Neal Robert Podmore**	565	33.8	
Labour	Keith Hoptroff	521	31.2	
Labour	Susan Webster	444	26.6	
Conservative	Roy Denis Tomkinson	395	23.7	
Moorlands Democratic Alliance	Richard Mark Martin-Bacon	343	20.5	
Moorlands Democratic Alliance	Brian Harry Pointon	337	20.2	
Liberal Democrats	Patrick Sean Frederick Callaghan	200	12.0	
Turnout		1670	38.03	+5.8
Independent **gain** from Ratepayers (Staffordshire Moorlands)				

Leek West (3 seats)
Party	Candidate	Votes	%	±%
Conservative	**Robert Warrington Plant**	678	40.8	
Conservative	**Benedict James Paul Emery**	612	36.9	
Liberal Democrats	**John Malcolm Fisher**	576	34.7	
Conservative	Colin Turner	527	31.4	
Moorlands Democratic Alliance	William Leslie Critchlow	474	28.6	
Moorlands Democratic Alliance	Reginald Davies	457	27.5	
Liberal Democrats	Alfred Wilson	364	21.9	
Liberal Democrats	Roy William Gregg	322	19.4	
Moorlands Democratic Alliance	Michael Charles Howson	274	16.5	
Turnout		1660	44.0	+1.7
Conservative **hold**		Swing		

Manifold (1 seat)
Party	Candidate	Votes	%	±%
Conservative	**Jason Nicholas Hails**	582	73.3	
Moorlands Democratic Alliance	Roger Cannon	199	25.0	
Majority		383	48.2	+69
Turnout		794	52.9	+6.8
Conservative **hold**		Swing		

Werrington (2 seats)
Party	Candidate	Votes	%	±%
Staffordshire Independent Group	**Lisa Chelsea Martin**	417	38.3	
Conservative	**David John Twemlow Shaw**	407	37.4	
Conservative	Barbara Aileen Hughes	402		
Labour	Jocelyn Anne Morrison	284	36.9	
Staffordshire Independent Group	Nigel Michael Meakin	249	22.9	
Turnout		1089	40.8	+6.9
Conservative **hold**		Swing		
