= Outwoods, East Staffordshire =

Civil parish in Staffordshire, England

Coordinates: 52.81753°N 1.65275°W

Outwoods is a civil parish in the English county of Staffordshire. Once a village it is now a suburb on the flanks of the town of Burton upon Trent separated from the town by the A38 road.

== Geography ==
Outwoods is located roughly north-west of Burton town centre and west of the suburb of Horninglow. In common with the town Outwoods forms part of the district of East Staffordshire.

== See also ==
- Listed buildings in Outwoods, East Staffordshire
