= St Bartholomew's Church, Butterton =

St Bartholomew’s Church, Butterton
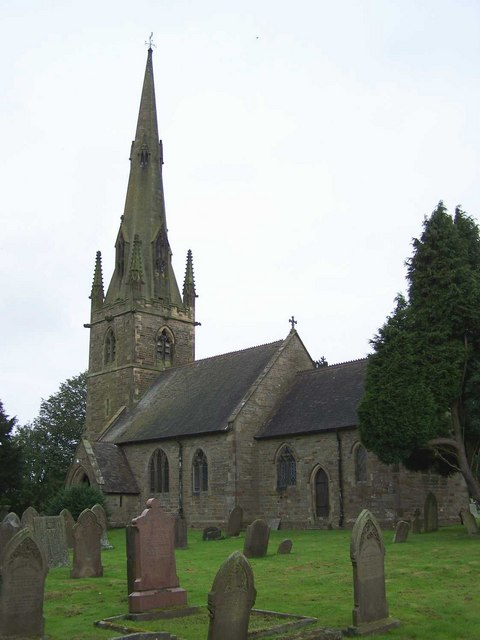
- St Bartholomew’s Church, Butterton
- St Bartholomew’s Church, Butterton
- 53°06′22.89″N 1°53′15.48″W
- OS grid reference: SK 07593 56580
- Location: Butterton
- Country: England
- Denomination: Church of England

Architecture
- Architect: Ewan Christian
- Groundbreaking: 1871
- Completed: 1873

Administration
- Diocese: Diocese of Lichfield
- Archdeaconry: Stoke-on-Trent
- Deanery: Alstonfield
- Parish: Butterton

St Bartholomew's Church, Butterton is a Grade II listed parish church in the Church of England in Butterton.

== History ==
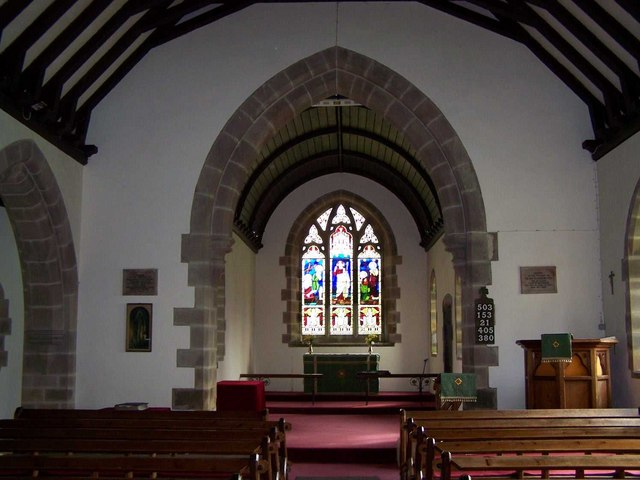
The nave and chancel

St Bartholomew's Church was redesigned by architect Ewan Christian and rebuilt in Butterton in 1871. It has a tower with two bells. The church is on the site of an earlier place of worship. The church's spire, which was added in 1879, dominates the local landscape and is one of the newest spires in the Peak District. Within the church there is a memorial plaque to Joseph Wood, Rowland Cantrill and William Hambleton, who all died trying to rescue Joseph Shenton from a disused mineshaft in 1842.

== Organ ==
The church has an organ which originally was built by William Hill in 1846. A specification of the organ can be found on the National Pipe Organ Register, and its historic value has been recognised with the award of an Historic Organ Certificate by the British Institute of Organ Studies.

== See also ==
- Listed buildings in Butterton
