= Anglesey, Staffordshire =

Civil parish in Staffordshire, England

Coordinates: 52.797°N 1.648°W

Anglesey is a civil parish in the East Staffordshire district of Staffordshire, England. It covers an area in the south of Burton upon Trent, south of the town centre, around Anglesey Road. According to the 2001 census it had a population of 5,835, increasing to 6,809 at the 2011 census.

The housing in Anglesey is mainly late 19th and early 20th century terraced housing although a new housing development is still under construction. Anglesey has a large park with a children's play area, football pitch and a skate park. Anglesey is very much home to a multicultural population.

== See also ==
- Listed buildings in Anglesey, Staffordshire
