= Listed buildings in Yoxall =

Yoxall is a civil parish in the district of East Staffordshire, Staffordshire, England. It contains 66 buildings that are recorded in the National Heritage List for England. Of these, three are listed at Grade II*, the middle grade, and the others are at Grade II, the lowest grade. The parish contains the village of Yoxall and the surrounding countryside. Most of the buildings are houses, cottages, farmhouses and farm buildings, a high proportion of which are timber framed or have timber-framed cores, and many of these are within the village. The other listed buildings include churches and associated structures, former watermills, bridges, mileposts, and a public house.

== Key ==
Grade	Criteria
II*	Particularly important buildings of more than special interest
II	Buildings of national importance and special interest

== Buildings ==
Name and location	Photograph	Date	Notes	Grade
St Peter's Church; 52.76885°N 1.79134°W		Early 13th century	The church was extended in the 14th and 17th centuries, but most of it is the result of rebuilding and restoration in 1865–68 by Henry Woodyer. It is built in stone with a slate roof, and consists of a nave with a clerestory, north and south aisles, a north porch, a chancel with north and south vestries, and a west tower. The round-headed south doorway dates from about 1200, and the tower, which has an embattled parapet and crocketed pinnacles, is in Perpendicular style.	II*
Pear Tree Farmhouse; 52.77119°N 1.79036°W	—	14th century	The farmhouse was remodelled in the 17th and 18th centuries. The original part is timber framed with cruck construction, the rebuilding is in red brick, and the roof is tiled. The house has a two-storey two-bay hall range, and a cross-wing with two storeys and an attic and two bays. The main doorway has a reeded architrave and a dentilled cornice, and the windows are mullioned and transomed casements.	II*
Reeve End Cottage; 52.77004°N 1.79246°W	—	14th century (probable)	The cottage probably originated as an aisled hall and has been altered and reduced in size. It is timber framed with roughcast cladding, a tile roof, one storey and an attic, and two bays. The windows are casements.	II
Thimble Hall; 52.77097°N 1.79624°W	—	16th century (probable)	A timber framed house with plaster infill on a timber plinth with a tile roof. There are two storeys and an attic, and two bays. The doorway has a plain surround and a cornice hood on brackets. The windows are casements, and there is a raking dormer.	II
Old Manor House; 52.76625°N 1.78927°W	—	Late 16th century (probable)	A timber framed house with brick infill and a tile roof. There are two storeys, and on the front is a bow window and a doorway with a plain surround and side lights.	II
The Old Mill; 52.78651°N 1.79586°W	—	Late 16th century (probable)	A former corn mill that was later altered, it is in timber framing with brick infill and brick, and has a tile roof. There is an L-shaped plan, with the former mill house incorporated in the main block. It contains doorways, a casement window, and two gabled dormers. At the northeast corner is an iron overshot waterwheel.	II
Woodhouse Farm House; 52.76900°N 1.77410°W	—	Late 16th century	The farmhouse is timber framed with painted brick infill and a tile roof. There are two storeys and three bays, with a two-bay projection at the front, and a 19th-century rear wing. There is one original mullioned window, and the other windows are casements.	II
Birmingham House; 52.76941°N 1.79078°W	—	Early 17th century	A house, later a shop, it is timber framed with brick infill and a tile roof. There are two storeys and an attic, a front of two gabled bays, and a rear wing with two storeys and two bays. On the front is a central doorway with a projecting shop front to the left, and a canted bay window to the right, and the other windows are casements.	II
Yew Tree House; 52.76577°N 1.79113°W	—	Early 17th century	The house, which has been altered, is in brick with a tile roof. There are two storeys, three bays, and a modern rear wing. The doorway has a plain surround and a rectangular fanlight, it is flanked by canted bay windows, and the other windows are sashes. Inside there is some exposed timber framing.	II
Arden Cottage; 52.77048°N 1.79032°W	—	17th century	The cottage, at one time an ale house, is timber framed, it was encased in brick in the 19th century, and has a tile roof. There is one storey and an attic, the doorway has a plain surround, the windows are casements, and there is an eyebrow dormer.	II
Bondfield Manor House; 52.76326°N 1.79398°W	—	17th century	The house has a timber framed core and was refronted in the 19th century. There are two storeys and four bays. The doorway has a moulded surround, engaged Doric columns, a rectangular fanlight, and an entablature, and the windows are sashes.	II
Darley Oaks Farm House; 52.80054°N 1.78165°W	—	17th century	The farmhouse, which was refashioned in the 19th century, is in brick with a tile roof. The original part has two storeys, the later part has three storeys, and there are three bays. On the front is a gabled porch, and the windows are a mix of sashes and casements.	II
Glen Cottage, The Nook, Dormer Cottage and Roslyn; 52.76990°N 1.79024°W	—	17th century	A row of four cottages with a timber framed core, encased in brick in the 19th century, and with a tile roof. They have one storey and attics, and the doorways have plain surrounds and segmental heads. There are seven casement windows, and six gabled dormers. In the north gable end is exposed timber framing.	II
Lea Cottage; 52.77047°N 1.79431°W	—	17th century	The cottage has a timber framed core, it is encased in brick, and has dentilled eaves and a tile roof with coped gable ends. There is one storey and an attic, and two bays. The doorway has a segmental head, the windows are casements, and there are two gabled dormers.	II
Magnolia Cottage; 52.76610°N 1.78813°W	—	17th century	The cottage is roughcast with a timber framed core and has a tile roof. There is one storey and an attic and an L-shaped plan. On the front is a gabled porch and a gabled dormer.	II
Old School House; 52.77049°N 1.79411°W	—	17th century	The house, which has been much restored, is timber framed with brick infill, and has a tile roof. There are two storeys and two bays. The doorway has a plain surround, and the windows are casements.	II
Sales Farm House; 52.78052°N 1.78064°W	—	17th century	The farmhouse, which has been much altered, is in brick with dentilled eaves, and has a tile roof with coped gable ends. There are two storeys, two bays, and later rear extensions. The doorway has a plain surround and a segmental head, and the windows are casements, also with segmental heads.	II
School Green Cottage; 52.77074°N 1.79621°W	—	17th century	The cottage is timber framed and rendered with a tile roof. There are two storeys and two bays, and the windows are casements.	II
Snails Place; 52.77019°N 1.79019°W	—	17th century	A row of timber framed cottages encased in brick with dentilled eaves, painted, and converted into a single dwelling. There is one storey and an attic, and five bays. The windows are sashes, and there are three box dormers.	II
Swarbourne House; 52.76620°N 1.79094°W	—	17th century	The house is timber framed, encased in brick, and has a tile roof. There are two storeys, an irregular plan, a front of three bays, and a rear wing. The doorway has a moulded surround with pilasters, panelled reveals, a fanlight, and a pediment. The windows are casements, and there is exposed timber framing on the sides.	II
The Firs; 52.77018°N 1.79039°W	—	17th century	A timber framed cottage encased in brick in the 19th century, with dentilled eaves and a tile roof. There are two storeys and two bays. The doorway has a moulded surround and a cornice, and the windows are casements.	II
The Grange; 52.76847°N 1.79118°W	—	17th century	The house, which has been restored, incorporates earlier material. It is in timber framing, brick and stone, and has parapets and a tile roof. There are two storeys and nine bays. In the centre is a projecting two-storey porch, and the outer bays also project and have Dutch gables. The doorway has a segmental head, and the windows are casements.	II
The Old Cottage; 52.78239°N 1.79137°W	—	17th century	The cottage is timber framed with painted brick infill and has a thatched roof. There are two storeys and three bays, and the windows are casements.	II
The Rookery; 52.76494°N 1.79157°W	—	17th century	The house, which was altered in the 19th century, is in brick with a bands in the outer bays, parapets, and a tile roof. There are two stories and three bays, the outer bays are gabled, and the windows are casements.	II
The Thatched Cottage; 52.76758°N 1.77547°W	—	17th century	The cottage, which has been much altered, is timber framed with painted brick infill and a thatched roof. There is one storey and an attic, two bays, and later extensions at the rear and to the right. The windows are casements.	II
Cottage near The Thatched Cottage; 52.76710°N 1.77467°W	—	17th century	The cottage is timber framed with cement rendering and a tile roof. There is one storey and an attic. The cottage has a blocked mullioned window, the other windows are casements, and there are two gabled dormers. In the south gable end is exposed timber framing.	II
Weaverslake; 52.77175°N 1.79985°W	—	17th century	A farmhouse, later a private house, it is timber framed with brick infill, partly roughcast, and has a tile roof. There are two storeys and three bays, and the windows are sashes.	II
Well Croft; 52.76647°N 1.77346°W	—	17th century	The house, which has been altered and extended, is timber framed with brick infill and a tile roof. There are two storeys, two bays, and a later one-bay extension. The windows are casements.	II
White House; 52.76325°N 1.79155°W	—	17th century	The cottage is timber framed with painted brick infill, and the roof is tiled. There are two storeys and three bays, and the windows are casements.	II
Yoxall Farm House; 52.77081°N 1.78994°W	—	17th century	The farmhouse has been much altered and most of it dates from the 18th and 19th centuries. It is in brick with a tile roof, two storeys and an attic, and a front that has two gables with plain bargeboards. The windows are sashes, and in the right return is exposed timber framing with brick infill.	II
The Corn Mill House; 52.76647°N 1.78952°W	—	c. 1700	The house was later extended. The original part is in brick on a stone plinth with a tile roof. It has two storeys and two bays. The central doorway has a plain surround and a pediment, and the windows are casements.	II
Woodmill; 52.78587°N 1.79673°W	—	Early 18th century	A brick house with a tile roof and a central pediment. There are two storeys and an attic and three bays. The doorway has a moulded surround, a radial fanlight, and a cornice hood on consoles, and the windows are casements with segmental heads.	II
Bond End Farmhouse; 52.76332°N 1.79224°W	—	18th century	The farmhouse is in brick with a tile roof, three storeys and three bays. The central doorway has a plain surround, and the windows are casements, including a tall window above the doorway.	II
Morrey Farm House; 52.76593°N 1.80941°W	—	18th century	A brick farmhouse with dentilled eaves and a tile roof. There are two storeys and two bays. The central doorway has a plain surround, the windows are casements, and all have segmental heads.	II
The Hollies; 52.76482°N 1.79159°W	—	18th century	A brick house that has a tile roof with coped gable ends. There are three storeys and five bays. The central doorway has a moulded surround and a pediment containing an escutcheon, and the windows are sashes.	II*
The Moorings; 52.76846°N 1.79072°W	—	18th century	A brick cottage with a tile roof, two storeys and two bays. The doorway has a plain surround and a segmental head, and the windows are casements.	II
Weaverslake Farmhouse; 52.77139°N 1.79768°W	—	18th century	The farmhouse has been extended. The original part is timber framed with brick infill, the extension is in brick, and the roof is tiled. The house has an L-shaped plan, the original part has one storey and an attic, and the later cross-wing to the left has two storeys. There are three bays, the left bay projecting with an outshut.	II
Yoxall Bridge; 52.75735°N 1.80726°W		Mid 18th century	The bridge carried the former A515 road over the River Trent, and has been bypassed by a later bridge. It is built in stone and consists of three segmental arches. The bridge has triangular cutwaters, and the parapet has been replaced by concrete piers and wire fencing.	II
Bond End House; 52.76384°N 1.79199°W	—	Late 18th century	A brick house with stone dressings, a moulded eaves cornice, and a tile roof. There are two storeys and three bays. The central doorway has engaged Doric columns, a radial fanlight and an entablature, and to the right is a canted bay window. The other windows are sashes with wedge lintels.	II
Forge Cottage; 52.76874°N 1.79071°W	—	Late 18th century (probable)	The house, which has been much altered, is in red brick with dentilled eaves and a tile roof. There are two storeys and two bays. The windows are casements, those in the ground floor with segmental heads, and the doorway is in the right return.	II
Glebe Farmhouse; 52.76694°N 1.81243°W	—	Late 18th century	The farmhouse is in brick with bands, corbelled eaves, and a tile roof. There are two storeys and an attic, and two bays. The doorway has a plain surround, and the windows are casements.	II
Golden Cup Inn; 52.76909°N 1.79069°W		Late 18th century (probable)	The public house, which was altered in the 19th century, is in brick with dentilled eaves and a tile roof. The main block has three storeys and two bays, there is a left wing with two storeys and one bay, and a right wing with two storeys and two bays. The doorway has a moulded surround and a cornice, and the windows are casements.	II
Hadley Cottage; 52.78560°N 1.80355°W	—	Late 18th century	A brick house with a tile roof, two storeys and an attic, and three bays. The doorway has a moulded surround, a radial fanlight, and an open pediment, and the windows are sashes with channelled lintels.	II
Lea Fields Farmhouse; 52.77087°N 1.79505°W	—	Late 18th century	The farmhouse, which was later extended, is in brick with dentilled eaves and a tile roof with a coped gable end on the left. There are two storeys and an attic, the original part has two bays, and the extension to the right is gabled. In the extension is a gabled porch, the windows are casements, and there are two hip roofed dormers.	II
Little Croft; 52.76866°N 1.79073°W	—	Late 18th century	The cottage is in brick with dentilled eaves and a tile roof. There are two storeys and two bays. The doorway has a plain surround and a segmental head, to the left is a bow window, and the other windows are casements.	II
Morrey House; 52.76594°N 1.80779°W	—	Late 18th century	A brick house with dentilled eaves and a tile roof. There are two storeys and three bays. On the front is a small iron porch and a doorway with pilasters and an entablature, and the windows are sashes.	II
Old Hall Farm House; 52.76609°N 1.80920°W	—	Late 18th century	A brick house with moulded eaves and a hipped tile roof. There are three storeys and three bays. On the front is a porch and a doorway with a moulded stuccoed surround and a cornice hood. The windows are casements with channelled lintels.	II
Yew Tree Farm House; 52.76651°N 1.81033°W	—	Late 18th century	The farmhouse, which was later altered, is in brick with dentilled eaves and a tile roof with coped gables. There are two storeys, two bays, and a rear wing with one storey and an attic. In the centre is a doorway with a cornice on consoles, and the windows are casements with segmental heads.	II
Vine Tree House; 52.76882°N 1.79071°W	—	c. 1786	The house is timber framed with brick refronting, dentilled eaves, and a tile roof. There are two storeys and three bays. The doorway has a plain surround and a segmental head, and the windows are casements with plain lintels.	II
Church of St Francis and former Presbytery; 52.78430°N 1.79135°W	—	1795	The church and attached presbytery are in brick with tile roofs, and were extended in 1834 and altered in the 20th century. The presbytery has a dentilled eaves cornice, two storeys and an L-shaped plan, The doorway has a semicircular fanlight, and the windows are sashes. The church consists of a nave, a gabled porch with a cross finial, transepts, a chancel, and a sacristy. Most of the windows contain Y-tracery, and on the transepts and at the east end are obelisk pinnacles.	II
Christchurch; 52.80842°N 1.78121°W		1806–08	The church was altered in 1840 and 1880, and the vestry was added in 1899. It is in red brick with stone dressings and a Welsh slate roof. The church consists of a nave, a south porch, a chancel, a north vestry, and a west tower. The tower has buttresses, string courses, a clock face, and an embattled parapet.	II
Wall and Gate, Christchurch; 52.80841°N 1.78154°W	—	1806–08	The wall and gateway were altered in about 1921 when they were adapted as a war memorial. The wall encloses the churchyard on the west and south sides, it is in red brick, part of it has stone embattled coping, and the rest has moulded brick coping. On the west side is a double gateway that has square brick piers with embattled stone caps, wrought iron crests, gates and an overthrow with a cross and a pendant lamp. On the south pier is a plaque commemorating the First World War, and to the right is a smaller gateway.	II
The Old Police House; 52.76827°N 1.79078°W	—	c. 1820	The house is in brick with dentilled eaves and a tile roof. There are two storeys, three bays, and a single-bay extension to the right with one storey and an attic. In the main part of the house are a doorway and casement windows, all with segmental heads. In the extension is a doorway and a casement window with flat heads, and a gabled dormer with decorative bargeboards.	II
Brackenhurst Farm House; 52.81234°N 1.78172°W	—	Early 19th century	A brick farmhouse with a tile roof, three storeys, an L-shaped plan, and three bays. The doorway has a plain surround and a rectangular fanlight, and the windows are sashes with plain lintels.	II
Brankley House; 52.78802°N 1.76673°W	—	Early 19th century	A red brick farmhouse with dentilled eaves and a tile roof. There are two storeys, three bays, and lower flanking one-bay wings. On the front is a three-sided bay window, and the other windows are casements with segmental heads.	II
Bridge over River Swarbourn; 52.76645°N 1.79013°W		Early 19th century	The bridge carries Town Hill (B5016 road) over the River Swarbourn. It is in brick and consists of three segmental arches, the middle arch the largest. The bridge has stone keyblocks, a stone string course, and a brick parapet with stone coping.	II
South View; 52.76960°N 1.79040°W	—	Early 19th century	A brick house with dentilled eaves and a hipped tile roof. There are two storeys and two bays. The doorway has a plain surround, and the windows are casements with segmental heads.	II
The Grange; 52.76701°N 1.77287°W	—	Early 19th century	The house is in engraved stucco and has a tile roof. There are two storeys and three bays. The central doorway has a gabled porch and a fanlight with a pointed head, and the windows are sashes with keystones and channelled lintels.	II
The Poplars; 52.76997°N 1.79207°W	—	Early 19th century	A brick house with a hipped slate roof, three storeys and three bays. The doorway has a moulded surround with pilasters, and entablature and a cornice. The windows are a mix of sashes and casements.	II
Milepost near Slade Covert; 52.80055°N 1.78587°W		19th century	The milepost is on the east side of the A515 road. It is hollow, in cast iron, and has a sloping top. On the top of the milepost is "YOXALL", and lower are the distances in miles to Yoxall, King's Bromley, Lichfield, Marchington, Sudbury, and Ashbourne.	II
Milepost, Woodlane; 52.78645°N 1.79049°W		19th century	The milepost is on the east side of the A515 road. It is hollow, in cast iron, and has a sloping top. On the top of the milepost is "YOXALL", and lower are the distances in miles to Yoxall, King's Bromley, Lichfield, Marchington, Sudbury, and Ashbourne.	II
The Three Houses; 52.76854°N 1.79072°W	—	19th century	The building is in brick on a timber framed core, with a tile roof, hipped in the centre. Originally five cottages, then three dwellings, and finally one house. There are three storeys, and the doorway and casements have segmental heads.	II
Tudor Cafe and Stores; 52.76736°N 1.79090°W	—	19th century	The building is in painted brick with an earlier timber framed core, and has a tile roof and two storeys. The central block has three bays, with a doorway on the left that has a reeded architrave and a cornice hood. To the right is a double shop front under a cornice on consoles, and the windows are sashes. To the left is a two-bay wing with sash windows, and to the right is a one-bay wing with a segmental-arched carriageway.	II
Yew Tree Lodge; 52.76590°N 1.79122°W	—	Mid 19th century	The house incorporates material from a 17th-century structure, it is in red brick and has a tile roof. There are two storeys and two bays, the left bay gabled. The doorway has a cornice hood on brackets, and the windows are casements. Inside the house is exposed timber framing.	II
Lilac Cottage; 52.76726°N 1.79085°W	—	Undated	The cottage is roughcast on earlier timber framing, and has dentilled eaves and a tile roof. There are two storeys and one bay. The doorway and the casement windows have segmental heads.	II
Arden Family War Memorial; 52.76921°N 1.79105°W		Undated	The memorial is in the churchyard of St Peter's Church, and is to the memory of Humphrey Arden, the son of the vicar of the church who was killed in the First World War, and his parents. It is in sandstone, and consists of a Calvary cross with a chamfered shaft on a moulded plinth and a base of two steps. There are three stone tablets with inscriptions relating to Humphrey Arden and his parents.	II
