= Fawfieldhead =

Hamlet and parish in Staffordshire, England

Coordinates: 53.170°N 1.888°W

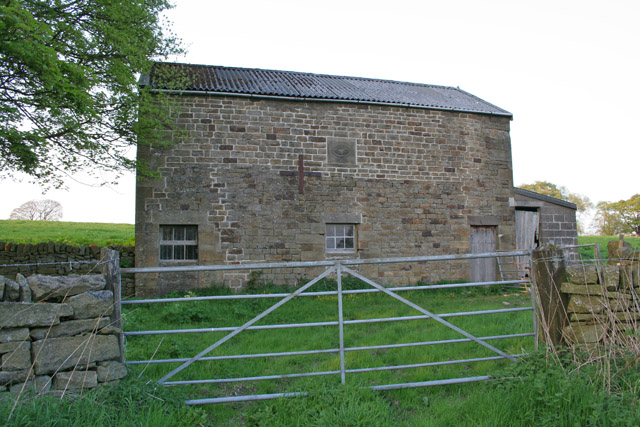
An image of Fawfieldhead

Fawfieldhead is a hamlet and civil parish in Staffordshire, England. It is situated north-east of Leek and south of Buxton, in the Peak District National Park.

It has a parish council.

== See also ==
- Listed buildings in Fawfieldhead
