= Bradley, Staffordshire =

Village and civil parish in Staffordshire, England

Coordinates: 52.7593°N 2.1787°W

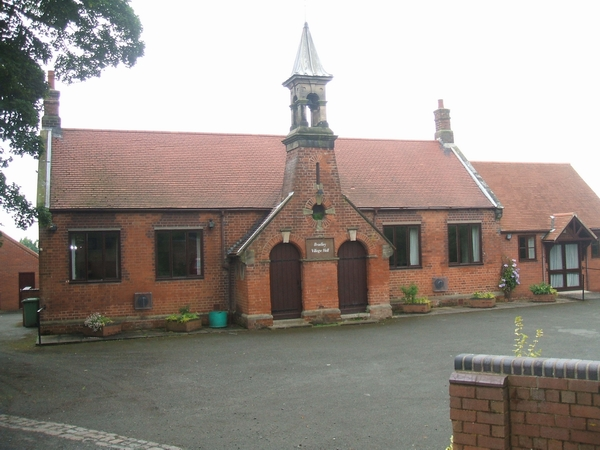
Bradley's village hall

Bradley is a village and civil parish in Staffordshire, England. The population of the civil parish at the 2011 census was 513. It is located close to the A518 road leading to the villages of Haughton and Gnosall towards Telford.

Bradley was recorded in the Domesday Book as the centre of an estate of a dozen manors held by Robert de Tosny, totalling over 90 households and valued at £7 in 1086.

== Notable people ==
- Benjamin Broomhall (1829 – 1911) a British advocate of foreign missions, administrator of the China Inland Mission, and author, born in Bradley.
- Wilf Phillips (1895 – 1976) an English footballer who played 292 professional games, born in Bradley.

== See also ==
- Listed buildings in Bradley, Staffordshire
