= Essington Hall Farmhouse =

Farmhouse in Essington, Staffordshire, England

Coordinates: 52.6299°N 2.0737°W

Essington Hall Farmhouse is a grade II listed building in Essington, Staffordshire.

== See also ==
- Listed buildings in Essington
