= Listed buildings in Fawfieldhead =

Fawfieldhead is a civil parish in the district of Staffordshire Moorlands, Staffordshire, England. It contains 17 listed buildings that are recorded in the National Heritage List for England. Of these, one is at Grade II*, the middle of the three grades, and the others are at Grade II, the lowest grade. The parish is almost completely rural, containing only small settlements. Most of the listed buildings are farmhouses, farm buildings, houses and cottages; the other listed buildings include a bridge, two churches, one of which is combined with a school and a schoolmaster's house, two former chapels, and a war memorial..

== Key ==
Grade	Criteria
II*	Particularly important buildings of more than special interest
II	Buildings of national importance and special interest

== Buildings ==
Name and location	Photograph	Date	Notes	Grade
Booseley Grange and pillars 53.15978°N 1.89911°W	—	17th century	The farmhouse, which was later altered, is in stone with a tile roof. There are two storeys and an L-shaped plan, consisting of a recessed range of two bays, a lean-to on the left, and a projecting gabled wing on the right with verge parapets. The doorway has a lintel with a low-relief blank coat of arms, and a hood on corbels, there is one fixed window, the other windows on the front are sashes, and at the rear are mullioned windows. At the entrance to the yard in front of the house are two stone piers about 2.5 metres (8 ft 2 in) high, each with a moulded string course and surbase, and a ball finial.	II
Lower Fleet Green Farmhouse, stable and hay loft 53.14766°N 1.91679°W	—	17th century	The farmhouse was altered and extended in the 19th century. It is in stone with a blue tile roof and two storeys. There is a T-shaped plan, with of a main range about 25 metres (82 ft) long consisting of the farmhouse and the outbuildings to the right, and a rear wing. The centre projects under a catslide roof, to its right is a doorway with a Tudor arch, and the windows are sashes. The outbuildings contain a stable door and external steps leading up to a hay loft door.	II
Brickyard Cottage; 53.15496°N 1.87480°W	—	Early 18th century	The house was extended to the right in the 19th century, and both parts have blue tile roofs and two storeys. The earlier part is in stone with verge parapets, one bay, and two-light square mullioned casement windows. The later part is taller, it is in brick, and has two bays, sash windows, and a doorway with a hood mould.	II
Fawfieldhead Summerseat; 53.16990°N 1.88839°W	—	1774	The house has an earlier core and later extensions. It is in stone with a blue tile roof. There are two storeys, two parallel ranges, the rear range larger, two bays, and a lower and later wing to the left. The central doorway has a frieze and a cornice, above it is a datestone, and the windows are casements. In the rear wing is an earlier doorway with a moulded surround and low-relief urns in the upper angles.	II
Old Ralphs; 53.15081°N 1.87466°W	—	Late 18th century	Originally a herdsman's cottage, it is stone with quoins, a slate roof, two storeys, and two bays. All the openings have quoins of chamfered rusticated stone blocks and wide lintels.	II
Hulme House Farmhouse; 53.14596°N 1.85527°W	—	Early 19th century	A stone farmhouse that has a blue tile roof with verge parapets. There are two storeys and three bays. The central doorway has a fanlight and a corbelled hood, the windows are sashes, and the openings have quoined surrounds.	II
Piggenhole Bridge; 53.16081°N 1.87525°W		Early 19th century	The bridge carries the B5053 road over Blake Brook. It is in stone, and consists of a single shallow arch on an impost band. The bridge has a string course with moulding above, the parapet and coping are gently cambered over the span, and the splayed approaches have piers.	II
The Cottage; 53.17381°N 1.87099°W	—	Early 19th century	The cottage is stuccoed with a broad eaves soffit and a hipped tile roof. There are two storeys, a square plan, and two bays. In the centre is a flat-roofed porch and a doorway that has pilasters and a door with Gothic panels. The windows are sashes with moulded surrounds and hood moulds.	II
The Holmes; 53.15631°N 1.86843°W	—	Early 19th century	The farmhouse is in stone and has a blue tile roof with verge parapets. There are two storeys and three bays. The central doorway has pilasters and a corbelled hood, and the windows are sashes.	II
The Rewlatch; 53.15130°N 1.86211°W	—	Early 19th century	A stone farmhouse with quoins, and a blue tile roof with verge copings. There are three storeys and three bays. The central doorway has a surround of chamfered quoins, and a cornice with shaped corbels. Two of the windows are replacement casements, and the others are sashes. The doorway and the windows have lintels grooved as voussoirs.	II
The Slack Farmhouse; 53.16901°N 1.89899°W	—	Early 19th century	The farmhouse is in stone with a blue tile roof, two storeys, and two bays. In the centre is a doorway, and the windows are sashes.	II
Former Methodist Chapel, Hulme End; 53.13120°N 1.84650°W		1834	The former chapel is in limestone with sandstone dressings, chamfered quoins, and a blue tile roof with verge parapets. It has a single storey and a gabled end facing the street. The round-headed entrance has a reeded surround, a fanlight, and a keystone. On the sides are sash windows with quoined surrounds, and above the entrance is a defaced datestone.	II
St Paul's Church, Newtown; 53.16458°N 1.91169°W		1837	The church is in stone on a plinth, with quoins, a moulded eaves band and a tile roof with verge parapets. It consists of a nave and a chancel in one unit, and a southwest porch that has a pediment with crocketed pinnacles. The round-headed doorway has block imposts, a fanlight, and a keystone, and above the porch is a datestone. The windows on the sides of the church are round-headed with rusticated surrounds and cornices, at the east end is a Venetian window.	II
Hallhill; 53.16622°N 1.89581°W	—	1838	The farmhouse, which has an earlier rear wing, is in stone, and has a blue tile roof with verge parapets. There are two storeys, an L-shaped plan, and a main range of two bays. The central doorway has a corbelled hood, and above it is a datestone. The windows on the front are casements, and in the rear wing they are mullioned.	II
Wesleyan Chapel, Newtown; 53.16700°N 1.90921°W		1841	The former chapel is in stone with quoins, and a blue tile roof with verge parapets. There is one storey and two bays. In the centre is a round-arched entrance with imposts and a keystone. The windows are sashes, there is a datestone above the entrance, to the right is a stone sundial, and there is another datestone on the right return.	II
St John's Church, school and school house 53.15613°N 1.87613°W		1842	A church, school and schoolmaster's house combined into one building, it is in stone and has a roof of blue tile with verge parapets. There are two and three storeys, with the church above the school, and the house adjacent to the right. External steps lead up to the church that has a lower gabled porch with a cross finial, and on the church gable end is a bellcote. In the church the windows are fixed, and elsewhere are mullioned casements. To the right is a recessed two-storey wing, and in front of the building are cast iron railings and gates on a stone plinth with end stone posts.	II*
Home Guard War Memorial; 53.14615°N 1.93965°W		1946	The memorial consists of a plaque attached to the west face of the triangulation pillar on the summit of Merryton Low. The pillar is in concrete and the plaque is in bronze. The plaque has an inscription and the names of the Leek Home Guard who went on to serve with the armed forces and were killed in action.	II
