= Church of St Peter, Yoxall =

Grade II* listed building in Staffordshire

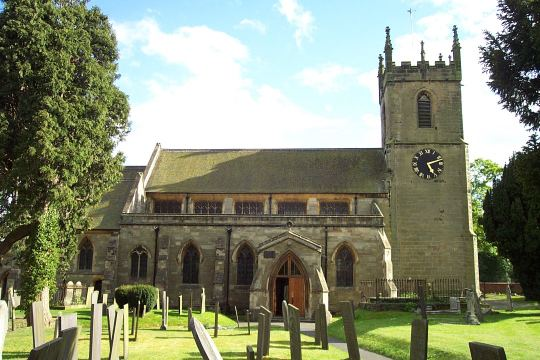

Religion
- Region: Yoxall, Staffordshire, England

Location
- Interactive map of Church of St Peter, Yoxall
- Coordinates: 52.7688°N 1.7915°W

The Church of St Peter is a Grade II* listed building in Yoxall, East Staffordshire, Staffordshire, England, built in the early 13th century.
