= Listed buildings in Weeford =

Weeford is a civil parish in the district of Lichfield, Staffordshire, England. The parish contains eight listed buildings that are recorded in the National Heritage List for England. All the listed buildings are designated at Grade II, the lowest of the three grades, which is applied to "buildings of national importance and special interest". The parish includes the village of Weeford and the surrounding countryside. The buildings in Weeford House Farm were at one time part of a large coach staging complex, and some of them are listed. The other listed buildings are a church, a farmhouse, and two lodges.

== Buildings ==
Name and location	Photograph	Date	Notes
Blackbrook Farmhouse; 52.63002°N 1.80215°W	—	18th century	A red brick farmhouse with a corbelled and dentilled eaves band, and a tile roof with verge parapets. It is in early Georgian style, and there are two storeys and an attic, a double depth plan, and a front of five bays. On the front is a doorway with a radial fanlight and a pediment, the windows are sashes with painted wedged segmental heads, the middle window in the upper floor with a raised keystone, and there are three gabled dormers.
St Mary's Church; 52.63255°N 1.79239°W		1802	The west bay, chancel and bell turret were added later in the 19th century. The church is built in sandstone with slate roofs, and consists of a nave, north and south transepts, a chancel, and a north vestry, with the bell turret at the west end. The bell turret has a square base, rising to an octagonal bell stage with a pyramidal cap, and the bell openings have Tudor arched heads.
Cartshed 120 metres northeast of Weeford House Farmhouse; 52.63297°N 1.79319°W	—	Early 19th century	The cartshed is in red brick with an eaves band and a tile roof. There is one storey and an attic, and the east front contains four segmental-headed cart entries.
Cartshed 150 metres northeast of Weeford House Farmhouse; 52.63314°N 1.79295°W	—	Early 19th century	The cartshed is in red brick with an eaves band, and a tile roof with a verge parapet on the left. There is a single storey, and the west front contains three segmental-headed cart entries.
Stable block east of Weeford House Farmhouse; 52.63279°N 1.79251°W	—	Early 19th century	The stable block is in red brick with an eaves band and a tile roof. There are two storeys, and a south front of 13 bays. In the centre is a square pavilion with a pyramidal roof surmounted by a timber dovecote. The front contains various openings, including a segmental-headed cart entry, with a round-arched opening above.
Stable and walls northeast of Weeford House Farmhouse; 52.63294°N 1.79281°W	—	Early 19th century	The stable is in red brick with string courses, and a tile roof with verge parapets and kneelers. There are two storeys, and a Classical front of three bays. In the centre is a segmental-arched opening, flanked by round-headed and rectangular blind openings. At the sides of the stable are walls of one-storey height and one bay wide.
Manley Lodge; 52.62781°N 1.81667°W	—	c. 1830–40	The lodge is in brick with stone dressings on a chamfered plinth, with a floor band, and a slate roof with coped gables and kneelers. There are two storeys and an L-shaped plan. The porch is gabled and has a four-centred arch and mullioned windows on the sides. The windows are iron-framed casements with chamfered surrounds. On the gables are finials with ogee domical caps.
Weeford Lodge; 52.63351°N 1.80256°W	—	1830s	The lodge is in red brick with stone dressings, a string course, and a slate roof with coped verge parapets on corbelled kneelers with finials. It is in Tudor style, there are two storeys, the front facing the road has two bays, a small central gable, and it contains mullioned windows. On the front facing the drive is a gabled porch and a Tudor arched doorway.
