= Listed buildings in Bagnall, Staffordshire =

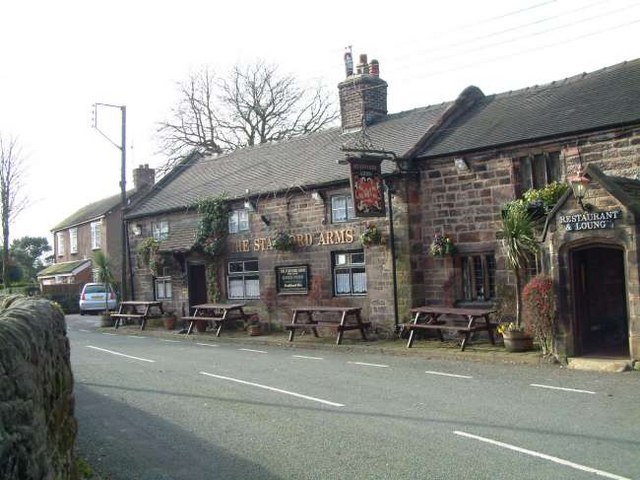
Stafford Arms Public House

Bagnall is a civil parish in the district of Staffordshire Moorlands, Staffordshire, England. It contains 18 listed buildings that are recorded in the National Heritage List for England. All the listed buildings are designated at Grade II, the lowest of the three grades, which is applied to "buildings of national importance and special interest". The parish contains the village of Bagnall and the surrounding area. The Caldon Canal runs through the northwest part of the parish, and the listed buildings associated with it are a bridge, a lock, a lock keeper's cottage, and stables. The other listed buildings are houses and associated structures, farmhouses, farm buildings, a church and items in the churchyard, a public house, a well house, a village cross, and a telephone kiosk.

== Buildings ==
Name and location	Photograph	Date	Notes
Village cross 53.05528°N 2.10795°W		16th century (possible)	The cross is in stone, and has a base of four steps. On this is a square chamfered shaft about 2.5 metres (8 ft 2 in) high with a Celtic cross head.
Bagnall Hall; 53.05502°N 2.10798°W	—	1603	The house was rebuilt in 1777 and altered in the 19th century. It is in stone with quoins, and has a hipped tile roof, two storeys and five bays, and a single-storey extension to the left. The doorway has a moulded surround and a fanlight, and above it is a blind window with a corbelled cornice surmounted by carved lions. The other windows are sashes with raised surrounds and glazing with a diagonal bar pattern, and on the front is a datestone.
Bank Farmhouse; 53.05455°N 2.10649°W	—	17th century	The farmhouse was refronted in the 18th century and altered in the 19th century. It is in stone with string courses, and has a tile roof with verge parapets. There are two storeys, a T-shaped plan, and a front of two bays. In the centre is a Tuscan doorcase, and the windows on the front are 20th-century casements. Elsewhere are a mullioned and transomed window, and a three-tier stair window.
Churchyard cross 53.05579°N 2.10847°W	—	17th century (probable)	The cross in the churchyard of St Chad's Church is in red sandstone. It consists of a tapered square shaft about 1 metre (3 ft 3 in) high on a base of two octagonal steps. The shaft is chamfered and on the enlarged head are inscribed Ionic scrolls.
Greenfields Farmhouse; 53.04253°N 2.11005°W	—	17th century	The farmhouse, which was restored and altered in 1888, is in stone, and has a tile roof with verge parapets on corbelled kneelers. There are two storeys and an attic, and four bays. Above the doorway is a heavy inscribed lintel, the windows in the ground floor are 19th-century casements, and elsewhere they have chamfered mullions.
Jack Hayes Farmhouse; 53.04617°N 2.11387°W	—	17th century	The farmhouse, which was later altered, is in stone, and has a tile roof with verge parapets. There are two storeys, three bays, and a single-storey extension on the right. The central doorway has a hood mould, above it is a blind window, the other windows are casements, those in the ground floor with hood moulds, and in the left gable end are windows with chamfered mullions.
Stafford Arms Public House and St Chad's House; 53.05548°N 2.10870°W		17th century	The building, which originated as three cottages, was altered in the 19th century, and is now a public house and an attached private house. It is in stone and has tile roofs with verge parapets, and two storeys. The two left parts form the public house, the first of which has three bays, a porch, and casement windows. The second part has two bays, a gabled porch with diagonal sides and a Tudor arched entrance, and windows with chamfered mullions. The right part, St Chad's House, is taller, in the ground floor is a bay window with an ogee-shaped roof on the right, and a porch with a hipped roof on the left, above which is a coat of arms. The other windows have chamfered mullions.
Barn south of Bagnall Hall; 53.05480°N 2.10756°W	—	18th century	The barn, later altered and then converted for residential use, is in stone and has a tile roof with verge parapets. There are two storeys, and four bays containing windows and divided by buttresses. In the right bay is a coach entry with an elliptical arch and a hood mould.
Lock No. 9 (Stockton Brook Top Lock); 53.06409°N 2.12269°W		c. 1779	The lock on the Caldon Canal was altered in the 19th century, and the gates were replaced in about 1981. The lock has stone retaining walls with repairs in blue brick and concrete. On the lower face are sandstone steps, and there is a catwalk span at the lower entrance with wrought iron spandrels.
Well house to Bagnall Springs; 53.05334°N 2.10395°W	—	1811	The well house is in stone with a slab roof. It has a rectangular plan, it is open to the east, and has an elliptical arch on scrolled corbelled imposts. Above the arch is a recessed inscribed panel.
Wall and gate, Bagnall Hall; 53.05515°N 2.10790°W	—	Early 19th century	The wall enclosing the front garden is in stone, and is about 50 metres (160 ft) long and 1.2 metres (3 ft 11 in) high. It has pitched coping and is ramped up to the gate piers that have ball finials, and there are further piers at the ends. The gates are in wrought iron and have an arched central panel containing scrolled work.
Chest tomb 53.05580°N 2.10830°W	—	Early 19th century	The chest tomb is in the churchyard of St Chad's Church. It is in stone and has inscribed sides, projecting angle piers, and a projecting slab top that has a hipped centre block with acroteria at the angles.
Mayfield; 53.06424°N 2.12184°W	—	Early 19th century	A red brick house with a tile roof, it has two storeys and an attic, and three bays. In the centre is a doorway with a moulded surround, and a pediment on consoles. Above the doorway is a Venetian window, and the other windows are casements that have wedge lintels with a raised central section, and cusped hood moulds.
Bridge No. 26 (Stanley Road Bridge); 53.06404°N 2.12197°W		Early 19th century	The bridge carries Stanley Road over the Caldon Canal. It is in stone and consists of a single elliptical arch. The bridge has slightly concave faces and a horizontal parapet line.
Lock keeper's cottage 53.06400°N 2.12236°W	—	Early 19th century	The cottage is adjacent to the Caldon Canal, and is in painted brick with a dentilled eaves band and a tile roof. There are two storeys and two bays. On the front is a gabled porch, and the windows are casements.
Stables at SJ 919 518; 53.06416°N 2.12269°W		Early 19th century	The stables are adjacent to the Caldon Canal, and are in red brick with a dentilled eaves band and a tile roof. There is a single storey, the building contains five segmental-headed openings, and on the left gable end is a lean-to.
St Chad's Church; 53.05589°N 2.10824°W		1834	The chancel was added in 1879–81. The church is built in millstone grit and has a tile roof. It consists of a nave, a chancel with a north vestry, and a west tower with a south porch. The tower has three stages and an embattled parapet, and the windows in the body of the church have Tudor arched heads.
Telephone kiosk 53.05536°N 2.10790°W	—	1935	A K6 type telephone kiosk, designed by Giles Gilbert Scott. Constructed in cast iron with a square plan and a dome, it has three unperforated crowns in the top panels.
