= Listed buildings in Norton Canes =

Norton Canes is a civil parish in the district of Cannock Chase, Staffordshire, England. It contains three buildings that are recorded in the National Heritage List for England. Of these, two are listed at Grade II*, the middle grade, and the other is at Grade II, the lowest grade. The parish contains the villages of Norton Canes and Little Wyrley, and is otherwise rural. The listed buildings are a country house and an associated barn, and a church.

== Key ==
Grade	Criteria
II*	Particularly important buildings of more than special interest
II	Buildings of national importance and special interest

== Buildings ==
Name and location	Photograph	Date	Notes	Grade
Little Wyrley Hall; 52.65115°N 1.98361°W	—	Early 16th century (probable)	A country house to which service wing was added in about 1660. The house was extended in 1691, and alterations were made in about 1820. It is in red brick with stone dressings, moulded eaves, and a tile roof, and it has a timber framed core. There are two storeys and an attic, and the house consists of two wings at right angles. The porch has a pediment and ball finials, and the gables, which are curved and stepped, also have ball finials. The windows are casements, and there are four gabled dormers. Inside the earlier part of the house is exposed timber framing.	II*
Barn south of Little Wyrley Hall; 52.65060°N 1.98380°W	—	1664	Originally a tithe barn, it has five bays and a tile roof. The original openings are blocked, and there is a modern doorway over which is an inscribed tablet.	II
St James' Church; 52.66826°N 1.98695°W		1832	The church, which was rebuilt in 1888 following a fire, is in sandstone with tile roofs, and is in Perpendicular style. It consists of a nave, a north aisle, a north transept, a south porch, a chancel with a north vestry and organ chamber, and a west tower. The tower has three stages, diagonal buttresses carried up as pinnacles, a two-light west window, and an embattled parapet.	II*
