= Listed buildings in Barlaston =

Barlaston is a civil parish in the Borough of Stafford, Staffordshire, England. It contains nine listed buildings that are recorded in the National Heritage List for England. Of these, one is listed at Grade I, the highest of the three grades, and the others are at Grade II, the lowest grade. The parish contains the village of Barlaston and the surrounding countryside. The listed buildings include a country house, a smaller house, cottages, a church, a milepost on the Trent and Mersey Canal, a cemetery chapel, and a war memorial.

== Key ==
Grade	Criteria
I	Buildings of exceptional interest, sometimes considered to be internationally important
II	Buildings of national importance and special interest

== Buildings ==
Name and location	Photograph	Date	Notes	Grade
St John the Baptist's Church; 52.94984°N 2.15811°W		Early 16th century	The oldest part is the tower, the body of the church dates from 1886 to 1888 and was designed by Charles Lynam, and the vestry was added in 1969. The church is built in stone with a tile roof, and consists of a nave, a north aisle, a south porch, a chancel, and a west tower with an embattled parapet.	II
Barlaston Hall; 52.94930°N 2.15847°W		c. 1756	A country house, probably designed by Sir Robert Taylor, and restored in about 1990. It is in brick with stone dressings, a rusticated basement, a moulded eaves cornice, and a slate roof. There are three storeys and a basement, and five bays, the middle three bays projecting under a pediment with ball finials. Steps lead up to the central doorway, which has Tuscan columns, a triglyph frieze, and a pediment. The windows have moulded architraves and lozenge-shaped glazing bars, and the doorway and windows have Gibbs surrounds. On the garden front is a bow window tiered over three storeys, and on the sides are canted bay windows with balustraded parapets, the south front with a Venetian window above.	I
Canal Milepost at SJ 8860 3883; 52.94679°N 2.17080°W		1819	The milepost is on the towpath of the Trent and Mersey Canal. It is in cast iron and consists of a circular post with two panels indicating the distances to Preston Brook and Shardlow.	II
Heyfield Cottages; 52.93794°N 2.18522°W	—	Early 19th century	A terrace of red brick cottages with dentilled eaves and a tile roof. There are two storeys and seven bays. The doorways and the windows, most of which are casements, have segmental heads.	II
Highfield Cottage; 52.94295°N 2.15687°W	—	Early 19th century	The cottage, which has been altered, is in painted brick with a tile roof. There are two storeys and three bays. The doorway has a stuccoed surround and a cornice hood, to the left is a canted bay window, and the other windows are small-paned casements.	II
Highfield House; 52.94272°N 2.15719°W	—	Early 19th century	The house is in plastered brick with projecting eaves and a slate roof. There are three storeys, three bays, a later single-storey bay to the right, and rear extensions. On the front is a porch with Doric columns and a cornice hood, and the windows are sashes with shutters.	II
Catnip Cottage and Ivy Cottage; 52.94295°N 2.15719°W	—	c. 1840	A pair of cottages in red brick with overhanging eaves, a slate roof, two storeys, and attics. Catnip Cottage has a modern rear wing, and Ivy Cottage has a doorway with pilasters and a pediment in Georgian style.	II
Cemetery Chapel; 52.94324°N 2.15358°W	—	1866	The cemetery chapel is in red sandstone on a plinth, with timber framed porches, and a tile roof with coped gable ends and apex crosses. It has a rectangular plan, with porches on the north and south sides, and is in Early English style. On the apex of the west gable is a gabled timber framed bellcote. The window arches have polychromatic voussoirs.	II
War memorial 52.94309°N 2.15892°W		1926	The war memorial is on the village green, and is in red sandstone. It consists of a Greek cross on a tapering octagonal shaft, with a moulded cap and a square foot. The shaft stands on an octagonal plinth with a cornice and a moulded foot, on a base of four octagonal steps. Around the plinth is an inscribed frieze, below which are the names of those lost in the First World War, and on the base are the names of those lost in the Second World War.	II
