= Listed buildings in Wootton, Staffordshire =

Wootton is a civil parish in the district of East Staffordshire, Staffordshire, England. The parish contains eight listed buildings that are recorded in the National Heritage List for England. All the listed buildings are designated at Grade II, the lowest of the three grades, which is applied to "buildings of national importance and special interest". The parish contains the village of Wootton and the surrounding countryside. The listed buildings consist of farmhouses, farm buildings, cottages, and a milepost.

== Buildings ==
Name and location	Photograph	Date	Notes
Nook Farmhouse; 53.00413°N 1.84159°W	—	17th century	The farmhouse, which was later extended, is in stone and has a tile roof with diapering. The original house has one storey and an attic, and to the right is a two-storey, one-bay extension, an extension with two storeys and three bays, and a three-bay former cowhouse. The windows are casements.
Lane Cottage and former detached kitchen 53.00228°N 1.84134°W	—	1704	The cottage and kitchen are in stone with tile roofs. The cottage has coped verges on rounded kneelers, two storeys and an attic, and two bays. The three-light windows have chamfered mullions, those in the ground floor also have hood moulds. The kitchen to the right was formerly detached, it is joined to the cottage by a 20th-century link, and has one storey and an attic, and two bays.
Pair of cottages south of Nook Farmhouse; 53.00358°N 1.84217°W	—	18th century	Originally one cottage, it was extended in the 19th century and divided into two. It is in stone, and has a tile roof with coped verges. There is one storey and an attic, and three bays. The windows are casements, and there are three gabled dormers.
The Dell Cottage; 53.00294°N 1.83907°W		18th century (probable)	A stone house that has a tile roof with coped verges. There are two storeys and an attic, an L-shaped plan, a front of two bays, and a rear wing. There is one fixed window, and the other windows are casements.
Barn and stables northeast of Nook Farmhouse; 53.00428°N 1.84147°W	—	Late 18th or early 19th century	The barn and stables are in stone and have a tile roof. The barn has chamfered eaves, coped verges on rounded kneelers, two storeys, and four bays. To the right is a lower, single-storey wing with three stable doors and three cantilevered basins. (Note: Street View in July 2009 shows that the barn has been converted for residential use.)
Stables northwest of Home Farmhouse; 53.00054°N 1.83147°W		Mid-19th century	The stables are in stone, with a tile roof, one storey and a loft, and an extension at both ends. The doorways and the windows, which are casements, have keystones. At the ends are flights of steps leading up to doors. (Note: Street View in June 2011 shows that the stables have been converted for residential use.)
Pigsties and feed shed south of Home Farmhouse; 52.99897°N 1.83124°W	—	Mid-19th century	The pigsties and feed shed are in stone, and have blue tile lean-to roofs against a high wall with returned sides. There are five pigsties with low doorways, walls with round-headed railings, feeding troughs, and on the rear wall are ventilation slits. The feed shed to the right has a ventilated door and a cat hole.
Milepost; 53.02574°N 1.85080°W		Mid- to late 19th century	The milepost is on the south side of the A52 road. It is in cast iron, and has a triangular section and a chamfered top. On the top is "WOOTTON", and on the faces are the distances to Froghall, Cheadle, Hanley, Stoke, Newcastle, and Ashbourne.

== Notes and references ==
=== Sources ===
- Historic England, "Nook Farmhouse, Wootton (1277307)", National Heritage List for England
- Historic England, "Lane Cottage Incorporating former detached kitchen, Wootton (1277309)", National Heritage List for England
- Historic England, "Pair of unoccupied cottages approximately 100 yards south of Nook Farmhouse, Wootton (1231945)", National Heritage List for England
- Historic England, "The Dell Cottage, Wootton (1277308)", National Heritage List for England
- Historic England, "Barn and stables approximately 20 yards north-east of Nook Farmhouse, Wootton (1232044)", National Heritage List for England
- Historic England, "Stables approximately 50 yards north-west of Home Farmhouse, Wootton (1231946)", National Heritage List for England
- Historic England, "Pigsties and feed shed approximately 200 yards south of Home Farmhouse, Wootton (1277280)", National Heritage List for England
- Historic England, "Milepost at N.G.R. SK 10104762, Wootton (1231943)", National Heritage List for England
- Historic England, Listed Buildings
- Pevsner, Nikolaus (1974), Staffordshire, The Buildings of England, Harmondsworth: Penguin Books, ISBN 0-14-071046-9
