= Listed buildings in Horton, Staffordshire =

Horton is a civil parish in the district of Staffordshire Moorlands, Staffordshire, England. It contains 29 listed buildings that are recorded in the National Heritage List for England. Of these, four are at Grade II*, the middle of the three grades, and the others are at Grade II, the lowest grade. The parish contains the villages of Horton and Rudyard, and the surrounding countryside. Most of the listed buildings are houses, including a former manor house and a country house, and associated structures, cottages, farmhouses and farm buildings. The other listed buildings include a church, an enclosure in the churchyard, a clapper bridge, and a former watermill.

== Key ==
Grade	Criteria
II*	Particularly important buildings of more than special interest
II	Buildings of national importance and special interest

== Buildings ==
Name and location	Photograph	Date	Notes	Grade
St Michael's Church; 53.11357°N 2.08786°W		15th century	The church was altered in the 17th century and restored in about 1864. It is in sandstone with a red tile roof, and mainly in Perpendicular style. The church consists of a nave, north and south aisles, a south porch, a chancel, and a west tower. The tower has four stages, diagonal buttresses, a Tudor arched west doorway, a west window, gargoyles, and an embattled parapet with crocketed pinnacles. The aisles also have embattled parapets.	II*
Blackwood Hill Farmhouse; 53.10041°N 2.11222°W	—	16th century	The farmhouse was extended in 1698, and further extended and altered in the 19th century. It is partly timber framed with infill and repairs in brick, and partly in stone, and has a tile roof with verge parapets. There are two storeys and an attic, and a front in three parts. To the right of the centre is a late 16th-century gabled timber-framed bay on a stone plinth that contains casement windows. To the right is a 17th-century range in stone containing a slight arched doorway with a massive inscribed and dated lintel, a chamfered mullioned window, and a small window. To the left is a recessed 19th-century range.	II
Dairy House Farmhouse; 53.12240°N 2.09533°W		1635	The farmhouse, which was altered in the 19th century, is in stone with string courses, and has a tile roof with verge parapets and ball finials. There are two storeys and an attic, and six bays. The first and second bays project, and share a gable, the next three bays each has a gabled dormer, and the right bay projects and also has a gable. The porch in the third bay has a doorway with pilasters, a cornice, and a ball finial, and above it is an oculus. There is another oculus in the left gable, and the other windows are mullioned. Above each of the dormer windows is a religious symbol.	II*
Blackwood House and barn 53.11110°N 2.10934°W	—	17th century	Alterations were made in 1850 and later. The farmhouse and barn are in stone with tile roofs, and form an L-shaped plan, with the barn joined to the house by a carriage entry. The house has two storeys and two bays, and most of the windows have chamfered mullions. The barn has two levels with a loft over stables, and contains loft doors, a top-hung casement window, doorways, butterfly-shaped vents, and a datestone. The carriage entry has a flat arch with giant vermiculated voussoirs.	II
Barn north of Blackwood Hill Farmhouse; 53.10063°N 2.11203°W	—	17th century	The barn, which was altered in the 19th century, is in stone and has a tile roof with verge parapets. The central part has two levels, consisting of a hay loft over a byre, and on each end is a lower single-level extension. The barn contains four top-hung casement windows, a stable door, and two hay loft doors.	II
Boot Hall; 53.11544°N 2.09118°W	—	17th century	A sandstone farmhouse that has a tile roof with verge parapets. There are two storeys and an attic, and a front of three bays, the right bay projecting and gabled. The windows are casements, some with chamfered or moulded mullions.	II
Barn northwest of Boot Hall; 53.11573°N 2.09148°W	—	17th century	The barn, which was substantially rebuilt and altered in the 19th century, is in stone, with quoins, and has a tile roof with verge parapets. There are two levels, it is about 20 metres (66 ft) long, and contains windows and three doorways, two of which have heavy lintels.	II
Hall Gates Farmhouse; 53.10333°N 2.09693°W	—	17th century	The farmhouse was extended in the 19th century. The original part is in stone, the later part is in red brick, and the roof is tiled, with verge parapets on shaped corbelled kneelers to the original part. There is one storey and an attic, and three bays. The doorway has a heavy lintel, the windows in the ground floor are chamfered and mullioned with moulded hood moulds, and in the attic are three half-dormers with raked roofs. Inside, there is a timber framed partition.	II
Heath House; 53.12126°N 2.08714°W	—	17th century	The farmhouse was extended in the 19th century. It is in stone with a brick rear wing and slate roofs. There are two storeys and a T-shaped plan. The front range has a projecting gable on the right, and to the left is a recessed longer range. Most of the windows are casements with heavy lintels, and in the left gable end is a chamfered mullioned window.	II
Horton Hall; 53.11399°N 2.08990°W		Mid 17th century	The house, which was altered later, has an earlier core. It is in stone with tile roofs, two storeys and attics, and an H-shaped plan, consisting of a three-bay central range, flanked by two-bay slightly projecting cross-wings. On the front are three parapetted gables with ball finials, and to the northeast are service ranges. In the centre is a doorway that has a lintel decorated with three sunken arches. The windows in the lower floors are sashes, and in the attics are mullioned windows. At the rear is a two-storey lean-to and a stair tower.	II*
Outbuilding north of Horton Hall; 53.11413°N 2.08977°W	—	17th century	The outbuilding attached to the hall is in stone with a string course, and has a tile roof with verge parapets. There are two storeys, two bays, and a single-storey extension on the left. There are garage doors in the main part and in the extension, and the windows have three lights and chamfered mullions.	II
Wall, railings, gates and gatepiers, Horton Hall; 53.11378°N 2.08980°W	—	17th century	The stone wall has pitched coping, and is stepped over an entrance with an inscribed and dated lintel. At the angles and flanking the gateway are stone piers with moulded capping. Between the piers are cast iron railings, and the decorative gates are in wrought iron.	II
Barn northeast of Newhouse Farmhouse; 53.11304°N 2.08847°W	—	17th century	The barn, which was substantially rebuilt in the 19th century, is in stone with a tile roof, and is about 20 metres (66 ft) long. There are two levels, and a single-storey gabled extension to the right end. The barn contains a byre door, a round-headed casement window, and an elliptically headed threshing floor entrance.	II
Rudyard Hall; 53.13413°N 2.05498°W	—	Mid 17th century	A manor house that was extended in the 19th century, it is in stone on a plinth, with quoins, and a moulded string course. There are two storeys and an attic, an original T-shaped plan, consisting of a hall range and a gabled cross-wing, and later extensions. The doorway has a segmental head and a massive lintel, and the windows are cross windows with mullions.	II*
Outbuilding north of Rudyard Hall; 53.13442°N 2.05512°W	—	17th century	The outbuilding is in stone with a tile roof, it has one storey and an attic, and a symmetrical front of two bays. In the centre is a doorway with a cornice, and above it is a gabled dormer. The windows have chamfered mullions and moulded hood moulds.	II
Newhouse Farmhouse; 53.11280°N 2.08872°W	—	Late 17th or early 18th century	The farmhouse is in stone with a raised string course and a tile roof. There are two storeys, four bays, and a lean-to on the right. On the front is a gabled porch, and the windows are mullioned.	II
Fields Farmhouse; 53.09744°N 2.10183°W	—	1705	The farmhouse was extended in the 18th century and altered in the 19th century. It is mainly in red brick with stone dressings, quoins, and roofs of tile and slate. The front is in two parts; the part at the left is gabled, it has two storeys and an attic, and contains chamfered mullioned windows. To the right is a 19th-century wing with two storeys, three bays, a string course, and a parapet on a cornice. In the centre is a doorway with a pediment on corbels. The windows are sashes with rusticated voussoirs; the window above the doorway has a moulded architrave, pilasters, and a keystone. At the rear is an 18th-century stone-faced wing containing a mullioned and transomed stair window.	II
Barn west of Heath House; 53.12150°N 2.08757°W	—	1720	The barn, which was substantially altered in the 19th century, is in stone, and has a tile roof with verge parapets on projecting kneelers. There are two levels and a long front of about 20 metres (66 ft). The barn contains a large segmental-headed cart entry with a raised keystone and moulded voussoirs, a hay loft door, and three top-hung casement windows.	II
The Vicarage; 53.11438°N 2.08824°W		Early 18th century	The vicarage is in stone, and has a brick front with quoins and string courses, and a stone slate roof with verge and front parapets. There are two storeys and an attic, a double-depth plan, and a symmetrical front of five bays. The central doorway has a moulded surround, a frieze, and a cornice. The windows are mullioned casements, and the window above the doorway has a round head.	II
Footbridge over Horton Brook; 53.10927°N 2.09396°W	—	18th century (or earlier)	A clapper bridge with two spans, consisting of two stone lintels, a central pier with cutwaters, and abutments. The path is cut into the top of the lintels, and there are later wooden railings.	II
Gratton Hall; 53.10271°N 2.09637°W	—	Mid 18th century	A farmhouse in red brick on a stone plinth with stone dressings, rusticated quoins, and a red tile roof. There are two storeys and three bays, the middle bay projecting. The central doorway has a moulded surround, a keystone, and a pediment on shaped corbels. Flanking it are bay windows, above it is an arched sash window in a moulded surround, and the other windows are casements.	II
Church Stile; 53.11332°N 2.08775°W	—	Late 18th century	A stone house that has a tile roof with verge parapets, two storeys and an attic, and three bays. In the centre is a doorway, and the windows are mullioned casements. At the rear is a blocked stair window.	II
Harracles Mill; 53.11423°N 2.07336°W	—	Late 18th century	A former water-powered corn mill, it is in stone with quoins and a tile roof. The doorway is reached by a flight of eight steps, and there are various other openings, including doorways and casement windows. The mill contains an iron and timber breastshot water wheel.	II
Cliffe Park Lodge and walls 53.13210°N 2.08371°W		Early 19th century	The lodge is in stone with an embattled parapet, two storeys and three bays. Flanking the bays are giant piers that rise to form embattled turrets. In the centre is a doorway with a corbelled hood, above which is a string course, and a shield-shaped window in a quatrefoil surround. The other windows are casements with hood moulds. The lodge is flanked by embattled walls, about 3.5 metres (11 ft) high and 7 metres (23 ft) long.	II
Outbuilding north of Horton Hall; 53.11422°N 2.08982°W	—	Early 19th century	The outbuilding is in stone, and has a blue tile roof with verge parapets. There are two levels, consisting of a hay loft over stables. The doorway is flanked by two-light mullioned windows, to the right is a gabled bay with an entrance and a window above, and further to the right is a lean-to.	II
Cliffe Park Hall; 53.13678°N 2.09352°W		c. 1830	A country house, it is in stone and has an embattled and pinnacled parapet, and chimney stacks disguised as turrets. There are two storeys, and the garden front has five bays. The middle bay projects as a semicircular bow, there are small bartizan turrets on the corners, and mock cross-loops, blind quatrefoils, and casement windows. The entrance front has three bays, the middle bay flanked by buttresses rising to become crocketed pinnacles, and to the left is a flat-roofed porte-cochère with pointed arches.	II
Grange Farmhouse, byre and barn 53.10071°N 2.11357°W	—	Mid 19th century	The farmhouse incorporates earlier material, and with the farm buildings, forms an L-shaped plan under tile roofs. The farmhouse has two storeys and four bays. The left bay is in stone, projecting and gabled, and contains mullioned casement windows. The right bay is also in stone, and the middle two bays are in brick, and they all contain casement windows. The farm buildings to the right are in stone, and contain hay loft doors, a blocked segmental arch, and windows, and in the gable end is a mullioned window.	II
Gates, gatepiers and wall, Rudyard Hall; 53.13433°N 2.05510°W	—	Mid 19th century	The walls are in stone, with pitched coping, they enclose the lawn in front of the hall on two sides, and incorporate a re-used 17th-century lintel. The gate piers are about 2.5 metres (8 ft 2 in) high, and each has a cruciform plan, a frieze, a moulded surbase, and a ball finial. Between the piers are wooden gates.	II
Pair of railed enclosures 53.11380°N 2.08829°W	—	c. 1860s	The enclosures are in the churchyard of St Michael's Church and are approximately square. The railings are in cast iron and are about 1.2 metres (3 ft 11 in) high. They have decorative quatrefoil patterns in middle of each rail and further decoration at the heads.	II
