= Listed buildings in Fazeley =

Fazeley is a civil parish in the district of Lichfield, Staffordshire, England. The parish contains 21 listed buildings that are recorded in the National Heritage List for England. All the listed buildings are designated at Grade II, the lowest of the three grades, which is applied to "buildings of national importance and special interest". The parish includes the town of Fazeley and the surrounding area. The Birmingham and Fazeley Canal and the Coventry Canal meet in the parish at Fazeley Junction, and four bridges crossing the former canal are listed. The other listed buildings include houses and cottages, a farmhouse, mills and associated structures, a road bridge, a church, and three mileposts.

== Buildings ==
| Name and location | Photograph | Date | Notes |
|---|---|---|---|
| 27 and 29 Park Lane; 52.61961°N 1.71513°W | — | 17th century | A pair of cottages with one storey and an attic, one bay each, and a tile roof. The left cottage is the older, it is timber framed with brick infill, and the right cottage dates from the 18th century and is in painted brick. Each cottage has a porch, and the windows are casements. |
| Old Mill; 52.61320°N 1.70274°W | | Late 18th century | The former cotton mill, which was built for Robert Peel, is in red brick with a tile roof. There are three storeys and 19 bays. The mill contains cast iron windows, each with a central pivoted section, those in the lower two floors with segmental heads, and there is an inserted vehicle entrance. |
| Dunstall Bridge; 52.63234°N 1.72738°W | | c. 1787 | The bridge carries a road over the Birmingham and Fazeley Canal. It is in red brick, and consists of a single segmental arch. The bridge has a plain stone coped parapet and end pilaster buttresses. |
| Dunstall Farm Bridge; 52.63035°N 1.72364°W | | c. 1787 | An accommodation bridge over the Birmingham and Fazeley Canal, it is in red brick, and consists of a single segmental arch. The bridge has a plain stone coped parapet and end pilaster buttresses. |
| Sutton Road Bridge; 52.62623°N 1.71479°W | | c. 1787 | The bridge carries the A543 road over the Birmingham and Fazeley Canal. It is in red brick, and consists of a single three-centred arch. The bridge has a parapet band, a plain stone coped parapet, and end pilaster buttresses. There is a small round-headed door to right hand side of arch on the north side. |
| Bridge No 77 (Towpath Bridge); 52.61547°N 1.70076°W | | c. 1789 | A roving bridge over the Birmingham and Fazeley Canal, it was largely rebuilt in the 19th century. The bridge is in red brick, and consists of a single segmental arch with a stone coped parapet, and end pilaster strips. |
| Fazeley Bridge; 52.61359°N 1.69088°W | — | 1796 | The bridge carries Watling Street over the River Tame, it is in stone, and consists of three segmental arches. The bridge has cutwaters to the east with pairs of baseless Tuscan columns, a cornice, and plain parapets with lamps. The ends are swept forward and are rusticated, and there are rectangular end buttresses with pyramidal caps. |
| 2 Coleshill Street; 52.61451°N 1.69926°W | — | Early 19th century | A house, later an office, in red brick, the ground floor painted, with a tile roof. There are three storeys and three bays. The doorway has pilasters, a fanlight, and a pediment, and there is a carriageway arch to the left. The windows are sashes with segmental heads. |
| 59 Coleshill Street; 52.61307°N 1.69963°W | — | Early 19th century | A red brick house with a moulded eaves cornice and a slate roof. There are two storeys and three bays. The central doorway has pilasters, a fanlight, and a pediment, and the windows are sashes with segmental heads. |
| 61 Coleshill Street; 52.61292°N 1.69975°W | — | Early 19th century | A red brick house that has a slate roof with coped verges. There are two storeys and three bays. The central doorway has pilasters, a fanlight, and a pediment, and the windows are sashes with segmental heads. |
| 116–120 Lichfield Street; 52.61630°N 1.70673°W | — | Early 19th century | A house, later shops, in red brick with a tile roof. There are two storeys, a double-depth plan and six bays. The windows and doorways vary, and the windows in the ground floor and in the gable end have segmental heads. |
| 122 Lichfield Street; 52.61631°N 1.70725°W | — | Early 19th century | A former millhouse, it is in brick, the main range has a tile roof, and the flanking ranges have Welsh slate roofs. The main range has a double-depth plan, three storeys and two bays. The doorway has pilasters, and the windows are casements, those in the lower two floors with segmental heads. The left range has one storey and one bay, and the right range has two storeys with a doorway in the left gable end and a lunette above. |
| Bonehill Farmhouse; 52.62528°N 1.72078°W | — | Early 19th century | The farmhouse is plastered and has a hipped tile roof. There are two storeys and an L-shaped plan, consisting of a main range and a rear wing in two parts. The main range has canted ends, eaves on brackets, three bays, a central doorway with reeded columns, a fanlight, and a pediment, and sash windows. The left rear part has two bays, and contains bay windows and a doorway with reeded columns and a pediment. The right part has a dentilled eaves band, three bays, one casement window, the other windows being sashes with wedge lintels and keystones, and sliding doors. |
| Bonehill Mill; 52.61641°N 1.70698°W | — | Early 19th century | A watermill in red brick that has a Welsh slate roof with brick copings. There is a rectangular plan, three storeys and a loft, a front of four bays, and a single-storey range on the left. The opening include a carriage arch, loading bays, and windows with segmental heads. Inside there is an iron undershot water wheel. |
| Bonehill House; 52.62062°N 1.71445°W | — | c. 1830 | The house is plastered with a floor band, an eaves cornice, and a hipped slate roof. There are two storeys, a front range of five bays, and rear extensions. In the centre is a Tuscan portico with two pairs of columns, side lights and a fanlight, all within a segmental arched opening. The windows are sashes, and on the right return is a bow window. |
| Junction House; 52.61558°N 1.70093°W | | Mid 19th century | The house overlooks Fazeley Junction, and is in red brick with a hipped slate roof. There are two storeys and three bays, the middle bay containing a large two-storey canted bay window with a hipped roof. The other windows are sashes, those in the ground floor with keystones, and wedge lintels grooved as voussoirs. |
| St Paul's Church; 52.61307°N 1.70035°W | | 1853–55 | The church is in stone with a slate roof, and consists of a nave and a chancel in one unit, north and south aisles, a south porch, a north annexe, and a northeast vestry. There is a bellcote towards the west of the church, and most of the windows are lancets. |
| Milepost at N.G.R. SK 17010297; 52.62423°N 1.75011°W | | Mid to late 19th century | The milepost is on the north side of Watling Street, and is in cast iron. It has a triangular plan and a sloping top. On the top is "FAZELEY" and on the sides are the distances to Fazeley, Tamworth, Atherstone, and Lichfield. |
| Milepost at N.G.R. SK 20100204; 52.61579°N 1.70461°W | | Mid to late 19th century | The milepost is on the north side of the B5404 road, and is in cast iron. It has a triangular plan and a sloping top. On the top is "FAZELEY" and on the sides are the distances to Atherstone, and Lichfield. |
| Fazeley Mill; 52.61430°N 1.70130°W | | 1886 | A textile mill alongside the Birmingham and Fazeley Canal, it is in red brick with sandstone dressings, and has a parapet and a double-pitched roof. The mill consists of a weaving shed incorporating a chimney, an engine house and a boiler house to the north. The weaving shed has five storeys and 29 bays, with pilasters, shallow-arched windows, and taking-in doors with a hoist beam. The engine house has two storeys and one bay, and contains a semicircular-headed window. |
| Milepost at N.G.R. SK 18200234; 52.61854°N 1.73271°W | | Early 20th century | The milepost is on the southeast side of the A543 road, and is in cast iron. It has a triangular plan and a sloping top. On the top is "FAZELEY PARISH" and on the sides are the distances to Sutton Coldfield and Tamworth. |
