= Listed buildings in Butterton =

Butterton is a civil parish in the district of Staffordshire Moorlands, Staffordshire, England. It contains nine listed buildings that are recorded in the National Heritage List for England. All the listed buildings are designated at Grade II, the lowest of the three grades, which is applied to "buildings of national importance and special interest". The parish contains the village of Butterton and the surrounding countryside. The listed buildings consist of farmhouses and farm buildings, cottages, a church, a bridge, and two mileposts.

== Buildings ==
Name and location	Photograph	Date	Notes
Greenlow Head; 53.10604°N 1.89583°W	—	Mid 17th century	A stone farmhouse with quoins, and a tile roof with coped verges on kneelers. There are two storeys and an attic, and a T-shaped plan, with a two-bay front range and a three-bay rear service wing. The central doorway has a moulded surround and a hood mould. The windows are sashes with chamfered mullions and hood moulds. In the central attic gable is a decorative lozenge-shaped window with a hood mould and a finial, and the south gable has a circular opening above a single-light window.
Bank House; 53.10667°N 1.89003°W	—	Mid 18th century	The farmhouse, which was later extended to the left, is in stone with quoins, and a tile roof with coped verges on kneelers. There are two storeys and two bays, and a rear lean-to projection. The doorway has a rusticated surround and a lintel grooved as voussoirs. The windows to the right are sashes with mullions.
Pair of cottages southwest of Bolland's Hall; 53.10762°N 1.89600°W	—	1777	The cottages are in stone with quoins, and a tile roof with coped verges on kneelers. There are two storeys and each cottage has one bay. The windows are two-light casements with mullions.
Milepost south of Brownlow Bridge; 53.11430°N 1.89315°W		Early 19th century	The milepost is on the north side of the B5053 road. It is in cast iron and has a triangular plan and a sloping top. On the top is "BUTTERTON" and on the sides are the distances to Warslow, Longnor, Buxton, Ipstones, Froghall, Leek, and Cheadle.
Milepost south of Fold Farmhouse; 53.09588°N 1.92493°W		Early 19th century	The milepost is on the northwest side of the B5053 road. It is in cast iron and has a triangular plan and a sloping top. On the top is "ONECOTE" and on the sides are the distances to Warslow, Longnor, Buxton, Ipstones, Froghall, Leek, and Cheadle.
Wetton Bridge; 53.10198°N 1.85921°W		Early 19th century	The bridge carries a road over the River Manifold. It is in stone, and consists of four semicircular arches of graded sizes. Between the arches are triangular cutwaters, and the bridge has a plain parapet that continues to form an embankment to the road.
Lanehouse Farmhouse; 53.10546°N 1.87979°W	—	Mid 19th century	The remodelling of an earlier house, it is in stone with rusticated quoins, and a tile roof with coped gables. The main block has two storeys and an attic, and three bays. The central doorway has a fanlight, and the windows are sashes with cornices and lintels grooved as voussoirs, those in the ground floor also with fluted keystones. At the rear is a lower two-storey, four-bay wing.
Cartshed, stable and granary west of Lanehouse Farmhouse; 53.10562°N 1.88013°W	—	1854	The building is in stone with quoins, and a tile roof with coped verges. There are two levels. To the left, external steps lead up to a granary door, to the right is a blocked segmental archway with voussoirs and a dated keystone, and between them is a stable door and a small window above it.
St Bartholomew's Church; 53.10640°N 1.88795°W		1871–73	The church was designed by Ewan Christian, and the spire was added in 1879. It is built in stone with a tile roof, and consists of a nave, a north aisle, a south porch, a chancel, and a west steeple. The steeple has a tower with three stages, an embattled parapet, crocketed corner pinnacles, and a recessed spire with two tiers of lucarnes.
