= Listed buildings in Hints, Staffordshire =

Hints is a civil parish in the district of Lichfield, Staffordshire, England. It contains seven buildings that are recorded in the National Heritage List for England. Of these, one is listed at Grade II*, the middle grade, and the others are at Grade II, the lowest grade. The parish contains the village of Hints and the surrounding countryside. The listed buildings consist of two churches, a cross and memorials in one of the churchyards, a farmhouse, and a group of farm buildings.

== Key ==
Grade	Criteria
II*	Particularly important buildings of more than special interest
II	Buildings of national importance and special interest

== Buildings ==
Name and location	Photograph	Date	Notes	Grade
Churchyard cross 52.62349°N 1.76848°W	—	17th century (possible)	The cross is in the churchyard of St Bartholomew's Church. The oldest part is the base, with the shaft dating from the 19th century. The cross is in sandstone, and has a square plinth of three steps on a base block. On this is a chamfered tapered shaft about 2 metres (6 ft 7 in) high carrying a sculpture of the Crucifixion.	II
Memorial; 52.62350°N 1.76828°W	—	Early 18th century	The memorial is in the churchyard of St Bartholomew's Church. It is a chest tomb in stone, and has a plinth, reeded pilasters at the corners, a moulded cornice to the top slab. The inscriptions are illegible.	II
Hints Manor; 52.62560°N 1.76748°W	—	Mid 18th century	A farmhouse in rendered brick with a floor band, a cornice, moulded eaves, and a hipped tile roof. There are two storeys and an attic, five bays, and an extensive rear wing on the right. The windows are sashes, and there are three hip roofed dormers.	II
Floyer memorial 52.62336°N 1.76821°W	—	1759	The memorial is in the churchyard of St Bartholomew's Church, and is to the memory of a member of the Floyer family. It is a chest tomb in stone, and has inscribed sides and a moulded top slab.	II
Outbuildings, Bucks Head Farm; 52.63284°N 1.78220°W	—	Mid to late 18th century	The outbuildings consist of barns and a former smithy. They are in red brick on a plinth and have roofs of Staffordshire blue tiles. The buildings form an L-shaped plan, with two ranges at right angles, and have two storeys. They contain doors and windows, some with segmental heads, ventilation slits and holes in various patterns, and the side wall of the smithy is open fronted.	II
St Bartholomew's Church; 52.62374°N 1.76843°W		1882–83	The church, designed by John Oldrid Scott in Early English style, is in yellow sandstone with dressings in red sandstone, and tile roofs. It consists of a nave, a south porch, a chancel and a north vestry. On the junction of the nave and chancel is a bellcote. The windows are lancets, and at the east end is a triple stepped lancet window.	II
Church of St Mary and St Giles and All Saints; 52.60229°N 1.79324°W		1911	The church, designed by Temple Moore, is in stone with a tile roof. It consists of a combined nave and chancel, a south porch, a two-storey gabled vestry, and a west tower. The tower has three stages, a three-light west window, and an embattled parapet. The east window has five lights, and the gabled porch is timber framed with brick infill, and has a roof of Westmorland slate.	II*
