= Listed buildings in Bradley, Staffordshire =

Bradley is a civil parish in the Borough of Stafford, Staffordshire, England. It contains eight listed buildings that are recorded in the National Heritage List for England. Of these, one is listed at Grade I, the highest of the three grades, and the others are at Grade II, the lowest grade. The parish contains the village of Bradley and the surrounding countryside. The listed buildings consist of a church, houses, farmhouses, a cottage and a public house, the oldest of which are timber framed or have timber framed cores.

== Key ==
Grade	Criteria
I	Buildings of exceptional interest, sometimes considered to be internationally important
II	Buildings of national importance and special interest

== Buildings ==
Name and location	Photograph	Date	Notes	Grade
Church of St Mary and All Saints; 52.75993°N 2.17991°W		Late 13th or early 14th century	The Lady Chapel was dedicated in 1343, the north arcade dates from the 14th century, the nave was rebuilt in the early 16th century, and the church was considerably restored in 1906–08 by W. D. Caröe. The church is built in stone with tile roofs, and consists of a nave, a north aisle with a vestry at the west end, a chancel, a northeast Lady Chapel, and a west tower. The tower has two stages and an internal southwest stair turret, diagonal buttresses, and a frieze of blind tracery below an embattled parapet. The nave also has an embattled parapet.	I
Littywood House; 52.76875°N 2.16563°W	—	c. 1400	A house with a timber framed core and cruck construction that has been considerably altered and extended. The exterior walls are in brick and the roof is tiled. There are three ranges, one with one storey and an attic containing the original hall, a central range dating from the later 16th century with two storeys, to the right is a range from the later 18th century with three storeys, and there are rear wings. On the front the windows are sashes and dormers, and at the rear they are casements. Inside the house are cruck trusses.	II
Former Post Office; 52.75793°N 2.17997°W	—	17th century	At one time an inn, the cottage is timber framed with brick infill and partly refaced in brick, and has a tile roof. There is one storey and an attic, and an extension to the right. In the ground floor is a bay window, and in the attic are three gabled dormers.	II
Red Lion Inn; 52.75946°N 2.17988°W		17th century (probable)	The public house has been considerably altered. It is partly timber framed, partly in stone, and partly in brick, and has been colour washed. The roof is tiled, there are two storeys, a front of three bays, a gabled porch, the windows are casements, and there are gabled dormers.	II
The Old Cottage; 52.75896°N 2.18017°W		17th century (probable)	The cottage is partly timber framed and partly in colour washed brick, and has a thatched roof. There are two storeys, two bays, and a single-storey extension to the left.	II
Billington Hall; 52.78161°N 2.17520°W	—	Late 18th century	A brick house with a hipped slate roof, it has three storeys, and three bays. The central doorway has Doric columns, a fanlight, and a pediment. The windows are a mix of sashes and casements, and those in the lower two floors have rusticated heads.	II
Church Farmhouse; 52.76047°N 2.18036°W		Late 18th century	The farmhouse is in red brick with a tile roof and parapeted gables. There are two storeys and an attic, and three bays. The central doorway has pilasters, a rectangular fanlight, a moulded cornice, and an entablature. The windows are sashes with keyblocks, and there are three gabled dormers.	II
Wells Farmhouse; 52.75806°N 2.17769°W	—	1835	The farmhouse is in brick and has eaves with lined soffits, and a hipped slate roof. There are three storeys and three bays. The doorway has panelled pilasters, a fanlight, and a pediment, and the windows are casements.	II
