= Listed buildings in Essington =

Essington is a civil parish in the district of South Staffordshire, Staffordshire, England. It contains four listed buildings that are recorded in the National Heritage List for England. All the listed buildings are designated at Grade II, the lowest of the three grades, which is applied to "buildings of national importance and special interest". The parish includes the village of Essington and the surrounding area. There are no listed buildings in the village, all the listed buildings being farmhouses in the surrounding area.

== Buildings ==
Name and location	Photograph	Date	Notes
Essington Hall Farmhouse; 52.62956°N 2.07312°W	—	16th to 17th century	The oldest part is the remains of a house incorporated at the rear. The main part dates from the early 19th century, and is in red brick with a sill band and a hipped tile roof. There are three storeys and four bays. The central doorway is flanked by columns with palmette capitals, and it has a fanlight, and an open pediment. The windows are sashes with shaped lintels, keystones, and hood moulds.
Pool Farmhouse; 52.63084°N 2.07439°W		Late 17th century	The farmhouse is in red brick with a floor band and a tile roof. The main range has two storeys and an attic, and two bays, and to the left is a later gabled two-storey cross-wing. On the front is a two-storey gabled porch, the windows are casements, and there are two gabled attic dormers. Inside, there is exposed timber framing.
Sneyd Farmhouse; 52.62343°N 2.03519°W	—	Early to mid 18th century	A brown brick farmhouse with storey bands and a tile roof. There are three storeys and a T-shaped plan, consisting of a main range with three bays, and a rear wing. In the centre is a doorway, and the windows are casements with segmental heads.
Chapel Farmhouse; 52.63812°N 2.04333°W	—	Late 18th century	The farmhouse was extended and remodelled in the late 19th century, and it has been divided into two dwellings. It is built in large bricks, to avoid brick tax, and has projecting eaves and a slate roof. There are two storeys, four bays, and two rear wings with outshuts between. There are two doorways, and the windows are casements.
