= Listed buildings in Hilderstone =

Hilderstone is a civil parish in the Borough of Stafford, Staffordshire, England. It contains 15 listed buildings that are recorded in the National Heritage List for England. All the listed buildings are designated at Grade II, the lowest of the three grades, which is applied to "buildings of national importance and special interest". The parish includes the village of Hilderstone and the surrounding countryside. Most of the listed buildings are houses, cottages and farmhouses, the others being a church and associated structures, and a telephone kiosk.

== Buildings ==
Name and location	Photograph	Date	Notes
Copes Cottage and The Shop; 52.90938°N 2.07771°W	—	18th century (probable)	A shop and adjoining cottage, the shop being the older, and the cottage added to the left in the early 19th century. They are in red brick and have a roof of tile and slate. There are two storeys and five bays. On the front are three doorways, one blocked, and casement windows, all with segmental heads.
Horseshoe Farmhouse and Horseshoe Cottages; 52.90901°N 2.07795°W	—	18th century	The farmhouse and cottages are in red brick with tile roofs. The farmhouse, to the left, is the older, and has one storey and an attic, a doorway with a plain surround, casement windows, and gabled dormers. The cottages, added in the early 19th century, have dentilled eaves, two storeys, and three doorways. All the doorways, and almost all the windows, have segmental heads.
Mill Farmhouse and Mill Cottage; 52.90537°N 2.07847°W	—	18th century	A pair of brick houses, the right house roughcast, with a tile roof. There are two storeys and four bays, the left bay gabled and projecting slightly to the front and rear. The doorways have plain surrounds, and the windows are casements, those in the left bay and in the ground floor of the other bays with cambered heads.
Stones Throw; 52.90521°N 2.07837°W		Late 18th century	A roughcast house with a tile roof, two storeys, three bays, and a two-storey outbuilding wing to the right. The doorway has a plain surround and a sidelight to the right, and the other windows are sashes.
The Stores; 52.90855°N 2.07864°W	—	c. 1800	The house, at one time a shop, is in red brick with dentilled eaves and a tile roof. There are two storeys and three bays. In the left bay is a projecting former shop bay window. To the right the doorway has a plain surround and a segmental head. The windows are small-paned casements, one with a segmental head, and the others with wedge lintels.
Hilderstone Hall; 52.91147°N 2.06574°W	—	c. 1810	A large stuccoed house with a hipped slate roof, in one, two and three storeys, and with an irregular plan. There is a front of six bays, and a three-bay projecting wing to the southwest. The entrance is in a single-storey projecting bay with a Doric portico, and the windows are sashes.
Church Farmhouse; 52.91100°N 2.07503°W	—	Early 19th century	A red brick farmhouse with dentilled eaves and a tile roof. There are two storeys and three bays, The central doorway has a semicircular stone head with a keystone and a radial fanlight, and the windows are sashes with plain lintels.
Hall Farm Cottages; 52.90862°N 2.07812°W	—	Early 19th century	A row of four red brick cottages, with corbelled eaves and a tile roof. There are two storeys and five bays, and a projecting single-storey gabled wing on the right. The doorways have plain surrounds, the windows are casements, and two of the doorways and the ground floor windows have segmental heads.
Hilderstone House; 52.91168°N 2.07382°W	—	Early 19th century	The house is in engraved stucco, with projecting eaves and a hipped slate roof, and is in Regency style. There are two storeys and a front of three bays, the middle bay projecting. The central doorway has a rectangular fanlight, the windows are sashes, and all have hood moulds. On the south front is a semicircular tiered bay window.
Lower Farmhouse; 52.90961°N 2.07733°W	—	Early 19th century	A red brick farmhouse with dentilled eaves and a tile roof. There are three storeys and four bays. The doorway has a plain surround and a semicircular fanlight, and the windows are casements with cambered heads.
The Smithy and School House; 52.90989°N 2.07746°W	—	Early 19th century	A pair of painted red brick houses with a slate roof, two storeys, and four bays. On the front are two gabled porches with decorative bargeboards, and doorways with plain surrounds, and the windows are Gothick-style casements with pointed arched heads.
Yew Tree House; 52.90770°N 2.07863°W	—	Early 19th century	The house is in plastered brick with a tile roof, two storeys, and three bays. The central doorway has a moulded surround, a radial fanlight, and an open pediment, and the windows are sashes.
Christ Church; 52.91009°N 2.07543°W		1827–29	The church, designed by Thomas Trubshaw in Gothic style, is in stone with a slate roof. It consists of a nave, north and south aisles, a short chancel, and a northwest steeple that consists of a tower and a recessed spire. The body of the church has lancet windows, buttresses, and pinnacles.
Wall, gates and gate piers, Christ Church; 52.91024°N 2.07596°W	—	c. 1829	The piers at the entrance to the churchyard are in stone and have cornice caps. Between them are wrought iron gates, and they are flanked by stone walls with coping.
Telephone kiosk 52.90971°N 2.07730°W	—	1935	A K6 telephone kiosk, designed by Giles Gilbert Scott. It is in cast iron and has a square plan and a saucer-domed roof. There are low relief crowns in the top panels, and margin-light glazing to the windows and the door.
