= Listed buildings in Curborough and Elmhurst =

Curborough and Elmhurst is a civil parish in the district of Lichfield, Staffordshire, England. The parish contains eight listed buildings that are recorded in the National Heritage List for England. All the listed buildings are designated at Grade II, the lowest of the three grades, which is applied to "buildings of national importance and special interest". The parish contains the small settlements of Elmhurst and Curborough and the surrounding countryside. The listed buildings consist of houses and farmhouses, a corn mill, a water pumping station, and two mileposts.

== Buildings ==
Name and location	Photograph	Date	Notes
Porch Cottage; 52.70935°N 1.83886°W	—	Late 15th century	The house was later altered and extended. It has a timber framed core, the outer walls have been rebuilt in brick, and it has a tile roof. There are two storeys and a front of four bays. On the front is a gabled porch with a shaped roof, and the windows are casements.
Lea Grange; 52.69871°N 1.84757°W	—	16th century (possible)	The farmhouse was refaced in the 19th century, altered and extended in the 20th century, and is in painted brick with a tile roof. There is a single storey and an attic, and three bays. The doorway has a segmental-headed fanlight, and the windows are casements, bow-fronted in the ground floor, and in the attic are half-dormers.
Sunnyside Farm; 52.70708°N 1.84784°W	—	1810	A red brick farmhouse with a dentilled eaves course and a tile roof. There are two storeys and two bays. In the centre is a gabled porch, and the windows are segmental-headed casements, the middle window in the upper floor blind.
Seedy Mill; 52.71694°N 1.85133°W	—	Early 19th century	A corn mill and office in red brick with tile roofs. The mill has two storeys with an attic and a part-basement, and it contains a window and a doorway, both with segmental heads. The office is lower, to the left, and also contains windows and a doorway with segmental heads, and there is a taller gabled extension.
Seedymill Farmhouse; 52.71737°N 1.85128°W	—	Early 19th century	A millhouse in red brick with a dentilled eaves course and a tile roof. There are three storeys, four bays, and a single-storey extension to the right. The doorway has a lean-to hood, and the windows are casements, those in the lower two floors with segmental heads.
Milepost at SK 102115; 52.70147°N 1.84928°W		Early 20th century (possible)	The milepost is on the northwest side of the A515 road. It is in cast iron, and has a triangular plan and a sloping head. On the head is "ELMHURST PARISH"" and on the sides are the distances to Handsacre, Abbots Bromley, Uttoxeter, and Lichfield.
Milepost at SK 106132; 52.71598°N 1.84401°W		Early 20th century (possible)	The milepost is on the west side of the A515 road. It is in cast iron, and has a triangular plan and a sloping head. On the head is "ELMHURST PARISH"" and on the sides are the distances to Handsacre, Abbots Bromley, Uttoxeter, and Lichfield.
Seedy Mill Waterworks Pumping Station (North Building); 52.72088°N 1.84661°W		1938	The water pumping station is in plum brick with blue headers on a plinth, with pink concrete dressings, a parapet, and a hipped roof. The engine house has a rectangular plan, with a range of lower offices behind. There is a single storey and a basement, and a front of three bays. Steps with railings lead up to the central porch with a moulded architrave and an inscribed entablature. The large windows are round headed with rusticated architraves, recessed quoins, and keystones, and above them are oculi.
