= Bagnall, Staffordshire =

Village in Staffordshire, England

Coordinates: 53.0545°N 2.1047°W

Bagnall
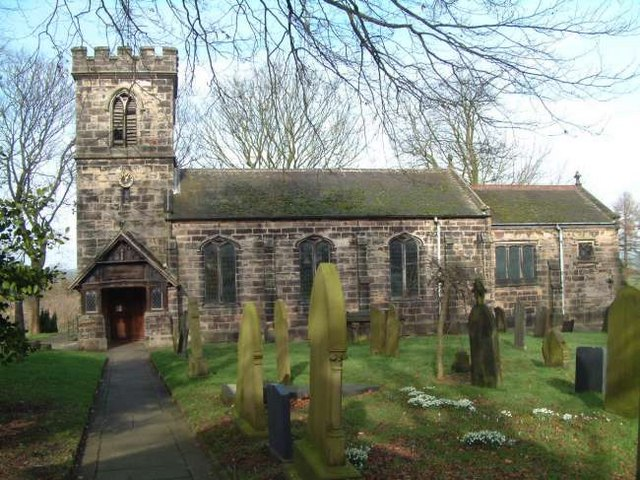
- Parish Church of Saint Chad

- Location within Staffordshire
- Population: 812
- OS grid reference: SJ930508
- Civil parish: Bagnall
- District: Staffordshire Moorlands
- Shire county: Staffordshire
- Region: West Midlands
- Country: England
- Sovereign state: United Kingdom
- Post town: Stoke-on-Trent
- Postcode district: ST9
- Dialling code: 01782
- Police: Staffordshire
- Fire: Staffordshire
- Ambulance: West Midlands
- UK Parliament: Stoke-on-Trent North

Bagnall is a village and civil parish in Staffordshire, England, north-east of Stoke-on-Trent. Although Bagnall is located only a few short miles from the former industrial city of Stoke-on-Trent, it retains a sense of rural isolation and has been described as one of the most tranquil villages in Staffordshire.

== Population ==
At the 2021 census, the parish had a population of 812.

== History ==
The Domesday Book of 1086 did not record Bagnall as a settlement at that time but noted that the area that now comprises the parish was largely wasteland containing one or two ploughlands, being part of the parish of Endon.

The earliest form of the placename is composed of two Anglo Saxon elements. The Oxford Dictionary of Placenames, A D Mills (Oxford University Press, ISBN 0-19-280074-4) states:

Bagnall, Staffs. Badegenhall 1273. Probably "nook of land of a man called Badeca". Old English Pers. name (genitive -n) +halh.

The etymologist Duigan in his "Notes on Staffordshire Place-names" suggests Bacga as the personal prefix, and the Old English word holt meaning woodland as opposed to halh above.

The etymologist Eckwall sees the first element as Old English Bodeca as the personal noun, with the second syllable being either halh or holt.

Early evidence of an individual adopting or being attributed with the surname originating from the settlement occurred when William de Bagenold was a witness to the deed of a gift of Ela de Aldethelegh to Trentham Priory circa 1154 (source: Dugdale's Monistacon vol.6, page 397).

The siting of the early settlement at Bagnall probably owes its origins to some sort of religious observance, it being sited at a place where cross-moorland routes converged. It was certainly on the old salt route to Weston-on-Trent.

The potter William Ault was born in Bagnall in 1842. He was involved with a number of companies in the Staffordshire potteries and Derbyshire making art pottery and more utilitarian wares.

== The parish church of Saint Chad ==
The parish church of Saint Chad is a Grade II listed building. The current building was built in 1834 and was designed by J. Beardmore, with further alterations and refurbishments carried out in 1880. This church replaced an early church which was called Saint Michael which was established in the Middle Ages. This church is thought to have replaced an even earlier building which is thought to have Saxon origins. The present building stand on a hilltop. The church is constructed using coursed squared and rough dressed stone in a Gothic style. The footprint plan is of a rectangular shape. The bell tower and chancel were added in 1878.

== See also ==
- Listed buildings in Bagnall, Staffordshire
