= Listed buildings in Anglesey, Staffordshire =

Anglesey is a civil parish in the district of East Staffordshire, Staffordshire, England. The parish contains two listed buildings that are recorded in the National Heritage List for England. Both the listed buildings are designated at Grade II, the lowest of the three grades, which is applied to "buildings of national importance and special interest". The parish is in the southern part of the town of Burton upon Trent, and both listed buildings are former breweries.

== Buildings ==
Name and location	Photograph	Date	Notes
Former Clarence Street Brewery; 52.79964°N 1.64317°W		1833	The building is in red brick, and consists of three blocks. At the south is an office block with sides of four bays and a pyramidal slate roof. On the front are four recesses arches containing segmental-headed windows. Recessed in the centre is a gabled loading bay with two storeys, the ground floor being open with a cast iron column. To the north is a malthouse containing a kiln, with an octagonal plan, five storeys, and an octahedral slate roof surmounted by a metal cowl and a weathervane in the shape of a goat. The malthouse contains segmental-headed windows, most of which are blocked.
Heritage Brewery; 52.80095°N 1.64474°W		Late 19th century	The former brewery is in red brick with stone dressings and a tile roof. To the right of centre is a brewhouse tower with four storeys and four bays with round-headed arches and separated by pilasters. Above the doorway in the third bay is a projecting hoist, the windows are casements, in the lower three floors with segmental heads, and on the roof is a tank loft with a pyramidal roof. The tower is flanked by a copper house on one side and by a fermenting house and a cask floor on the other.
