= Listed buildings in Stretton, East Staffordshire =

Stretton is a civil parish in the district of East Staffordshire, Staffordshire, England. It contains five buildings that are recorded in the National Heritage List for England. Of these, one is listed at Grade II*, the middle grade, and the others are at Grade II, the lowest grade. The parish is to the north of, and continuous with, the town of Burton upon Trent, and is largely residential. The listed buildings consist of a church, a house, a farmhouse, and two mileposts, one on a canal, and the other on a road.

== Key ==
Grade	Criteria
II*	Particularly important buildings of more than special interest
II	Buildings of national importance and special interest

== Buildings ==
Name and location	Photograph	Date	Notes	Grade
St Mary's Church; 52.83418°N 1.62483°W		1895–97	The church is in sandstone, the nave and chancel have tile roofs, the aisles have copper roofs, and the church is in Decorated style. It consists of a nave with a clerestory, north and south aisles. north and south porches, a transept, a chancel, a vestry and a tower at the crossing. The tower has four stages, angle buttresses, a deep parapet and a pyramidal roof. At the west end are corner turrets and a five-light window; the east window also has five lights.	II*
Milepost at SK 259 260; 52.83096°N 1.61662°W		1819	The milepost is on the towpath of the Trent and Mersey Canal. It is in cast iron, and has a circular shaft with a domed head, and a convex plaque divided down the centre. The faces are inscribed with the distances in miles to Shardlow and to Preston Brook, and at the base of the shaft is the date and details relating to the maker.	II
Bridge Farmhouse; 52.83442°N 1.62756°W	—	Early 19th century	The farmhouse is in red brick with a tile roof, two storeys, and three bays. The doorway has a moulded surround and a radial fanlight, and the windows are sashes.	II
Dovecliffe; 52.84397°N 1.61820°W	—	Early 19th century	A Georgian house in red brick with a band, a cornice, a blocking course, and a hipped Westmorland slate roof. There are two storeys and five bays. The central doorway has a rusticated surround, columns, a pediment, and a radial fanlight, and the windows are sashes. On the garden front is three-sided bay window, and on the side is a pedimented porch.	II
Milepost at SK 258 256; 52.82795°N 1.61726°W	—	Early 19th century	The milepost is in cast iron, it has a circular plan, and an enlarged domed head. It is inscribed with the distances in miles to Burton upon Trent and to Derby.	II
