= Horton, Staffordshire =

Village in Staffordshire, England

Coordinates: 53.11285°N 2.08810°W

Horton
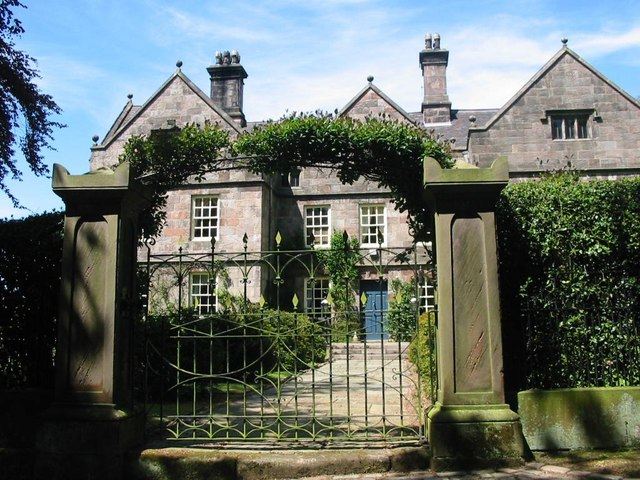
- Horton Hall

- Location within Staffordshire
- Population: 781 (2011 Census)
- Civil parish: Horton
- District: Staffordshire Moorlands
- Shire county: Staffordshire
- Region: West Midlands
- Country: England
- Sovereign state: United Kingdom
- Post town: Leek
- Postcode district: ST13
- Police: Staffordshire
- Fire: Staffordshire
- Ambulance: West Midlands
- UK Parliament: Staffordshire Moorlands

Horton is a village and civil parish in the Staffordshire Moorlands district, in the county of Staffordshire, England. The population of the civil parish as taken at the 2011 census was 781. It is situated about 3 miles (5 km) W of Leek.

It is first attested as Horten(e) in 1226. The place-name Horton is a common one in England. It derives from Old English horu 'dirt' and tūn 'settlement, farm, estate', presumably meaning 'farm on muddy soil'.

Horton Hall is a Jacobean manor house, built on the site of an earlier house dating back to the 12th Century. It was in the ownership of the Edge family from the 1330s until 1710. It was damaged in the English Civil War, and rebuilt by Timothy Edge from 1653; his initials with the date occur on the lintel of the gateway in the garden.

== See also ==
- Listed buildings in Horton, Staffordshire
