= Listed buildings in Outwoods, East Staffordshire =

Outwoods is a civil parish in the district of East Staffordshire, Staffordshire, England. The parish contains two listed buildings that are recorded in the National Heritage List for England. Both the listed buildings are designated at Grade II, the lowest of the three grades, which is applied to "buildings of national importance and special interest". The parish is to the northwest of Burton upon Trent, and the listed buildings are mileposts of different styles.

== Buildings ==
Name and location	Photograph	Date	Notes
Milepost at Beam Hill Cross Roads; 52.83102°N 1.65333°W		c. 1828	The milepost was erected by the Ashby-de-la-Zouch to Tutbury Turnpike Trust, and is on the west side of the A511 road. It is in cast iron, and has a triangular section, an inclined head, and a segmental arched back plate. On the head is "HORNINGLOW PARISH", on the back plate is the distance to London, and on the front are the distances to Burton upon Trent and Tutbury.
Milepost, Forest Road; 52.81239°N 1.67400°W		19th century	The milepost is on the southwest side of the B5017 road. It is in cast iron, and has a triangular section and a chamfered top. On the top is "BURTON", and on the faces are the distances to Newborough, Uttoxeter, Marchington, Abbots Bromley, and Burton upon Trent.
