= List of civil parishes in Staffordshire =

This is a list of civil parishes in the ceremonial county of Staffordshire, England. There are 195 civil parishes.

There is no population data for some of the smallest parishes.

The districts of Tamworth and Stoke-on-Trent are fully unparished. Parts of Cannock Chase District and the boroughs of Newcastle under Lyme and Stafford are unparished. These correspond to two separate parts of the former Cannock Urban District, the former municipal boroughs of Stafford, Newcastle-under-Lyme and Tamworth as well as the former county borough of Stoke-on-Trent.

Civil Parish	Civil Parish Population 2011	Area (km^{2}) 2011	Pre 1974 District	District
Abbots Bromley	1,779	35.81	Uttoxeter Rural District	East Staffordshire
Acton Trussell and Bednall	1,248	21.43	Cannock Rural District	South Staffordshire
Adbaston	561	20.21	Stafford Rural District	Stafford
Alrewas	2,852	3.44	Lichfield Rural District	Lichfield
Alstonefield	304	14.28	Leek Rural District	Staffordshire Moorlands
Alton	1,226	9.24	Cheadle Rural District	Staffordshire Moorlands
Anglesey	6,809	1.45	Burton upon Trent County Borough	East Staffordshire
Anslow	805	10.97	Tutbury Rural District	East Staffordshire
Armitage with Handsacre	5,335	7.73	Lichfield Rural District	Lichfield
Audley Rural	8,437	29.51	Newcastle under Lyme Rural District	Newcastle-under-Lyme
Bagnall	765	7.55	Leek Rural District	Staffordshire Moorlands
Balterley	221	4.10	Newcastle under Lyme Rural District	Newcastle-under-Lyme
Barlaston	2,858	12.19	Stone Rural District	Stafford
Barton-under-Needwood	4,225	5.54	Tutbury Rural District	East Staffordshire
Berkswich	2,010	4.57	Stafford Rural District	Stafford
Betley	1,033	6.64	Newcastle under Lyme Rural District	Newcastle-under-Lyme
Biddulph (town)	19,892	26.87	Biddulph Urban District	Staffordshire Moorlands
Bilbrook	4,913	5.61	Seisdon Rural District	South Staffordshire
Blithfield	230	11.14	Uttoxeter Rural District	East Staffordshire
Blore with Swinscoe			Cheadle Rural District	Staffordshire Moorlands
Blymhill and Weston-under-Lizard	823	27.33	Cannock Rural District	South Staffordshire
Bobbington	588	10.84	Seisdon Rural District	South Staffordshire
Bradley	513	18.56	Stafford Rural District	Stafford
Bradnop	310	13.28	Leek Rural District	Staffordshire Moorlands
Branston	6,749	8.86	Tutbury Rural District	East Staffordshire
Brereton and Ravenhill	6,538	5.28	Rugeley Urban District	Cannock Chase
Brewood and Coven	7,329	50.54	Cannock Rural District	South Staffordshire
Bridgtown	1,284	0.93	Cannock Urban District	Cannock Chase
Brindley Heath	827	22.56	Lichfield Rural District	Cannock Chase
Brizlincote	5,385	2.02	Burton upon Trent County Borough	East Staffordshire
Brocton	1,082	9.38	Stafford Rural District	Stafford
Brown Edge	2,486	6.81	Leek Rural District	Staffordshire Moorlands
Burntwood (town)	26,049	15.80	Lichfield Rural District	Lichfield
Burton	3,521	5.48	Burton upon Trent County Borough	East Staffordshire
Butterton	248	6.88	Leek Rural District	Staffordshire Moorlands
Cannock Wood	1,031	2.34	Cannock Urban District	Cannock Chase
Caverswall	971	8.30	Cheadle Rural District	Staffordshire Moorlands
Chapel and Hill Chorlton	425	7.06	Newcastle under Lyme Rural District	Newcastle-under-Lyme
Cheadle (town)	12,165	24.83	Cheadle Rural District	Staffordshire Moorlands
Chebsey	566	16.87	Stone Rural District	Stafford
Checkley	4,700	21.85	Cheadle Rural District	Staffordshire Moorlands
Cheddleton	6,311	27.58	Cheadle Rural District	Staffordshire Moorlands
Cheslyn Hay	7,293	3.77	Cannock Rural District	South Staffordshire
Church Eaton	680	16.98	Stafford Rural District	Stafford
Clifton Campville	912	20.38	Lichfield Rural District	Lichfield
Codsall	7,582	12.38	Seisdon Rural District	South Staffordshire
Colton	671	15.23	Lichfield Rural District	Lichfield
Colwich	4,528	28.62	Stafford Rural District	Stafford
Consall	150	8.67	Cheadle Rural District	Staffordshire Moorlands
Coppenhall	294	3.65	Cannock Rural District	South Staffordshire
Cotton	345	8.33	Cheadle Rural District	Staffordshire Moorlands
Creswell	339	4.47	Stafford Rural District	Stafford
Croxden	255	13.89	Uttoxeter Rural District	East Staffordshire
Curborough and Elmhurst	203	5.23	Lichfield Rural District	Lichfield
Denstone	1,220	8.27	Uttoxeter Rural District	East Staffordshire
Dilhorne	497	10.01	Cheadle Rural District	Staffordshire Moorlands
Doxey	2,364	2.07	Stafford Municipal Borough	Stafford
Draycott in the Clay	862	7.37	Uttoxeter Rural District	East Staffordshire
Draycott in the Moors	1,029	15.87	Cheadle Rural District	Staffordshire Moorlands
Drayton Bassett	1,037	12.73	Lichfield Rural District	Lichfield
Dunstall	209	8.07	Tutbury Rural District	East Staffordshire
Dunston	281	6.45	Cannock Rural District	South Staffordshire
Eccleshall	4,651	74.04	Stone Rural District	Stafford
Edingale	632	12.96	Lichfield Rural District	Lichfield
Elford	632	8.04	Lichfield Rural District	Lichfield
Ellastone	320	5.73	Uttoxeter Rural District	East Staffordshire
Ellenhall	144	10.30	Stafford Rural District	Stafford
Endon and Stanley	3,221	10.86	Leek Rural District	Staffordshire Moorlands
Enville	487	20.17	Seisdon Rural District	South Staffordshire
Essington	4,957	14.64	Cannock Rural District	South Staffordshire
Farewell and Chorley	318	6.65	Lichfield Rural District	Lichfield
Farley	151	8.70	Cheadle Rural District	Staffordshire Moorlands
Fawfieldhead	289	18.69	Leek Rural District	Staffordshire Moorlands
Fazeley (town)	4,530	5.87	Lichfield Rural District	Lichfield
Featherstone	4,725	4.19	Cannock Rural District	South Staffordshire
Fisherwick	203	8.62	Lichfield Rural District	Lichfield
Forsbrook	5,095	5.39	Cheadle Rural District	Staffordshire Moorlands
Forton	308	14.94	Stafford Rural District	Stafford
Fradley			Lichfield Rural District	Lichfield
Fradswell	194	5.84	Stafford Rural District	Stafford
Fulford	5,931	14.91	Stone Rural District	Stafford
Gayton	154	6.24	Stafford Rural District	Stafford
Gnosall	4,736	37.77	Stafford Rural District	Stafford
Great Wyrley	11,060	5.57	Cannock Rural District	South Staffordshire
Grindon	203	13.25	Leek Rural District	Staffordshire Moorlands
Hammerwich	3,818	10.10	Lichfield Rural District	Lichfield
Hamstall Ridware	313	10.89	Lichfield Rural District	Lichfield
Hanbury	510	15.39	Tutbury Rural District	East Staffordshire
Harlaston	394	8.74	Lichfield Rural District	Lichfield
Hatherton	601	8.29	Cannock Rural District	South Staffordshire
Haughton	1,082	11.47	Stafford Rural District	Stafford
Heath Hayes and Wimblebury	14,085	3.90	Cannock Urban District	Cannock Chase
Heathylee	222	24.17	Leek Rural District	Staffordshire Moorlands
Heaton	262	10.87	Leek Rural District	Staffordshire Moorlands
Hednesford (town)	16,789	7.11	Cannock Urban District	Cannock Chase
High Offley	980	12.73	Stafford Rural District	Stafford
Hilderstone	641	8.55	Stone Rural District	Stafford
Hilton	257	3.02	Cannock Rural District	South Staffordshire
Himley	802	8.86	Seisdon Rural District	South Staffordshire
Hints	355	9.96	Lichfield Rural District	Lichfield
Hixon	1,917	7.33	Stafford Rural District	Stafford
Hoar Cross	250	7.07	Tutbury Rural District	East Staffordshire
Hollinsclough	149	7.44	Leek Rural District	Staffordshire Moorlands
Hopton and Coton	1,615	11.23	Stafford Rural District	Stafford
Horninglow and Eton	14,191	3.00	Burton upon Trent County Borough	East Staffordshire
Horton	781	21.63	Leek Rural District	Staffordshire Moorlands
Huntington	4,536	6.32	Cannock Rural District	South Staffordshire
Hyde Lea	451	3.94	Stafford Municipal Borough	Stafford
Ilam	402	24.58	Leek Rural District	Staffordshire Moorlands
Ingestre	194	3.56	Stafford Rural District	Stafford
Ipstones	1,488	24.57	Cheadle Rural District	Staffordshire Moorlands
Keele	4,129	8.62	Newcastle under Lyme Rural District	Newcastle-under-Lyme
Kidsgrove (town)	23,756	17.44	Kidsgrove Urban District	Newcastle-under-Lyme
King's Bromley	1,163	15.98	Lichfield Rural District	Lichfield
Kingsley	2,204	17.25	Cheadle Rural District	Staffordshire Moorlands
Kingstone	629	11.86	Uttoxeter Rural District	East Staffordshire
Kinver	7,225	41.96	Seisdon Rural District	South Staffordshire
Lapley, Stretton and Wheaton Aston		25.48	Cannock Rural District	South Staffordshire
Leek (town)	20,768	17.42	Leek Urban District	Staffordshire Moorlands
Leekfrith	363	28.38	Leek Rural District	Staffordshire Moorlands
Leigh	975	29.43	Uttoxeter Rural District	East Staffordshire
Lichfield (city)	32,219	14.02	Lichfield Municipal Borough	Lichfield
Loggerheads	4,480	47.88	Newcastle under Lyme Rural District	Newcastle-under-Lyme
Longdon	1,505	17.92	Lichfield Rural District	Lichfield
Longnor	334	3.36	Leek Rural District	Staffordshire Moorlands
Longsdon	543	8.60	Leek Rural District	Staffordshire Moorlands
Lower Penn	998	7.43	Seisdon Rural District	South Staffordshire
Madeley	4,222	21.63	Newcastle under Lyme Rural District	Newcastle-under-Lyme
Maer	489	15.22	Newcastle under Lyme Rural District	Newcastle-under-Lyme
Marchington	2,017	18.01	Uttoxeter Rural District	East Staffordshire
Marston	158	7.08	Stafford Rural District	Stafford
Mavesyn Ridware	1,128	13.36	Lichfield Rural District	Lichfield
Mayfield	1,319	12.02	Uttoxeter Rural District	East Staffordshire
Milwich	418	12.29	Stone Rural District	Stafford
Newborough	476	13.03	Uttoxeter Rural District	East Staffordshire
Norbury	371	12.97	Stafford Rural District	Stafford
Norton Canes	7,479	15.16	Cannock Urban District	Cannock Chase
Oakamoor	593	6.30	Cheadle Rural District	Staffordshire Moorlands
Okeover			Uttoxeter Rural District	East Staffordshire
Onecote	220	16.63	Leek Rural District	Staffordshire Moorlands
Outwoods	2,286	3.92	Tutbury Rural District	East Staffordshire
Pattingham and Patshull	2,246	17.59	Seisdon Rural District	South Staffordshire
Penkridge	8,526	41.74	Cannock Rural District	South Staffordshire
Perton	10,686	16.95	Seisdon Rural District	South Staffordshire
Quarnford	242	12.70	Leek Rural District	Staffordshire Moorlands
Ramshorn			Uttoxeter Rural District	East Staffordshire
Ranton	382	7.44	Stafford Rural District	Stafford
Rocester	1,700	5.02	Uttoxeter Rural District	East Staffordshire
Rolleston on Dove	3,267	6.55	Tutbury Rural District	East Staffordshire
Rugeley (town)	17,749	6.34	Rugeley Urban District	Cannock Chase
Rushton	485	13.14	Leek Rural District	Staffordshire Moorlands
Salt and Enson	333	5.94	Stafford Rural District	Stafford
Sandon and Burston	361	16.21	Stone Rural District	Stafford
Saredon	829	8.52	Cannock Rural District	South Staffordshire
Seighford	1,793	18.71	Stafford Rural District	Stafford
Shareshill	759	4.02	Cannock Rural District	South Staffordshire
Sheen	234	11.62	Leek Rural District	Staffordshire Moorlands
Shenstone	7,359	29.81	Lichfield Rural District	Lichfield
Shobnall	7,061	3.04	Burton upon Trent County Borough	East Staffordshire
Silverdale	4,957	3.66	Newcastle under Lyme Municipal Borough	Newcastle-under-Lyme
Standon	879	13.39	Stone Rural District	Stafford
Stanton	259	7.13	Uttoxeter Rural District	East Staffordshire
Stapenhill	7,977	1.83	Burton upon Trent County Borough	East Staffordshire
Stone Rural	1,652	36.96	Stone Rural District	Stafford
Stone (town)	16,385	8.89	Stone Urban District	Stafford
Stowe-by-Chartley	418	22.70	Stafford Rural District	Stafford
Streethay			Lichfield Rural District	Lichfield
Stretton	8,611	4.49	Tutbury Rural District	East Staffordshire
Swindon	1,231	8.02	Seisdon Rural District	South Staffordshire
Swinfen and Packington	1,006	10.82	Lichfield Rural District	Lichfield
Swynnerton	4,453	36.44	Stone Rural District	Stafford
Tatenhill	762	15.04	Tutbury Rural District	East Staffordshire
Teddesley Hay			Cannock Rural District	South Staffordshire
Thorpe Constantine			Lichfield Rural District	Lichfield
Tittesworth	315	7.50	Leek Rural District	Staffordshire Moorlands
Tixall	241	10.07	Stafford Rural District	Stafford
Trysull and Seisdon	1,150	13.78	Seisdon Rural District	South Staffordshire
Tutbury	3,288	10.18	Tutbury Rural District	East Staffordshire
Uttoxeter Rural	1,635	27.97	Uttoxeter Rural District	East Staffordshire
Uttoxeter (town)	13,089	14.14	Uttoxeter Rural District	East Staffordshire
Wall	433	7.56	Lichfield Rural District	Lichfield
Warslow and Elkstones	320	15.28	Leek Rural District	Staffordshire Moorlands
Waterhouses	1,134	26.96	Cheadle Rural District	Staffordshire Moorlands
Weeford	215	10.47	Lichfield Rural District	Lichfield
Werrington	5,689	10.22	Cheadle Rural District	Staffordshire Moorlands
Weston	965	3.64	Stafford Rural District	Stafford
Wetton			Leek Rural District	Staffordshire Moorlands
Whitgreave	209	5.23	Stafford Rural District	Stafford
Whitmore	1,554	20.62	Newcastle under Lyme Rural District	Newcastle-under-Lyme
Whittington	2,603	10.95	Lichfield Rural District	Lichfield
Wigginton and Hopwas	1,016	11.50	Lichfield Rural District	Lichfield
Winshill	8,466	2.36	Burton upon Trent County Borough	East Staffordshire
Wombourne	14,157	11.84	Seisdon Rural District	South Staffordshire
Wootton	154	14.87	Uttoxeter Rural District	East Staffordshire
Wychnor	397	16.78	Tutbury Rural District	East Staffordshire
Yoxall	1,895	19.24	Tutbury Rural District	East Staffordshire

== See also ==
- List of civil parishes in England
