= Stafford Rural District =

Former local government area in the UK

Coordinates: 52.80°N 2.16°W

- Area
  - 1901: 56,813 acres (229.91 km^{2})
  - 1961: 80,250 acres (324.8 km^{2})
- Population
  - 1901: 10,407
  - 1971: 22,992
- History
  - Created: 1894
  - Abolished: 1974
- Status: Rural district

Stafford Rural District was a rural district in the county of Staffordshire. It was created in 1894 and abolished in 1974 by virtue of the Local Government Act 1972. On formation it contained the following civil parishes:

- Baswich
- Bradley
- Brocton
- Castle Church
- Chartley Holme
- Colwich
- Creswell
- Ellenhall
- Fradswell
- Gayton
- Haughton
- Hopton and Coton
- Ingestre
- Marston
- Ranton
- Salt and Enson
- Seighford
- Stowe
- Tillington
- Tixall
- Weston under Trent
- Whitgreave
- Worston
- Yarlet

In 1934 Chartley Holme, Worston and Yarlet were removed whilst Church Eaton, Forton, Gnosall and High Offley were added.

== See also ==
- Gnosall Rural District
