= Marston, Milwich =

Village in Staffordshire, England

Coordinates: 52.846680°N 2.1183202°W

Marston
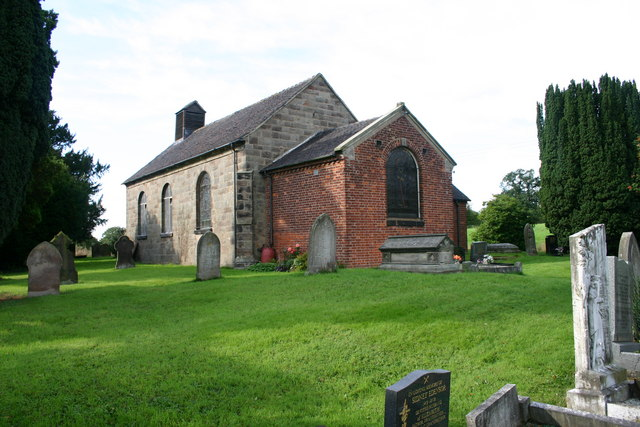

- Location within Staffordshire
- Area: 7.08 km^{2} (2.73 sq mi)
- Population: 158 (2011 census)
  - Density: 22/km^{2} (57/sq mi)
- Civil parish: Marston
- District: Stafford
- Shire county: Staffordshire
- Region: West Midlands
- Country: England
- Sovereign state: United Kingdom
- Post town: STAFFORD
- Postcode district: ST18
- Dialling code: 01889
- Police: Staffordshire
- Fire: Staffordshire
- Ambulance: West Midlands

Marston is a village and civil parish 12 miles (19 km) south of Stoke-on-Trent, in the Stafford district, in the county of Staffordshire, England. In 2011 the parish had a population of 158. The parish touches Creswell, Hopton and Coton, Salt and Enson, Sandon and Burston, Stone Rural and Whitgreave.

== Features ==
There are two listed buildings in Marston. Marston's church is dedicated to St Leonard.

== History ==
The name "Marston" means 'Marsh farm/settlement'. Marston was recorded in the Domesday Book as Mer(se)tone. Marston was formerly a township and chapelry in the parish of Stafford, St Mary, on 24 March 1884 part of the parish was transferred to Tillington, the transferred area had 107 houses in 1891. On 25 March 1885 part of "Salt and Enson" was transferred to the parish, the transferred area had 2 houses in 1891, and on 1 April 1934, 53 acres were transferred to Marston from "Salt and Enson". On 1 April 1934, the parish of Yarlet was abolished and merged with Marston. Yarlet is a deserted medieval village in the parish.
