= Listed buildings in Salt and Enson =

Listed buildings in English civil parish

Salt and Enson is a civil parish in the Borough of Stafford, Staffordshire, England. It contains five listed buildings that are recorded in the National Heritage List for England. All the listed buildings are designated at Grade II, the lowest of the three grades, which is applied to "buildings of national importance and special interest". The parish contains the village of Salt and the surrounding area. The listed buildings consist of a farmhouse, two road bridges, one over the Trent and Mersey Canal, and the other over the River Trent, a former engine house, and a church.

== Buildings ==
Name and location	Photograph	Date	Notes
Enson Farmhouse; 52.85741°N 2.08926°W	—	18th century	The farmhouse is in brick with a string course, a modillioned eaves cornice, and a tile roof with coped gables. There are two storeys and an attic, and three bays. The windows are casements, and there are two gabled dormers.
Bridge No. 82 (Salt Bridge); 52.85070°N 2.06239°W		Late 18th century (probable)	The bridge carries a road over the Trent and Mersey Canal. It is in red brick and brindled brick with stone dressings. The bridge consists of a single segmental arch with stone springing stones, impost bands, arch rings, cornices, and parapets. On the east side the arch rings are stepped outwards, and on the west side is a recessed panel with a surrounding band.
Weston Bridge; 52.84084°N 2.04819°W		Late 18th century (probable)	The bridge carries the A518 road over the River Trent. It consists of a single wide segmental arch, and has two semicircular string courses and coped parapets.
Engine House, Weston Quarry; 52.83831°N 2.06147°W	—	1823	The engine house is in large sandstone blocks, partly cut into the rock face. There are two levels, on the front are two two-light mullioned windows, and a coped pediment-gable. On the left of the ground floor are two doorways, and on the left side is an opening for the arm of the beam engine.
St James' Church; 52.84826°N 2.06960°W		1840–42	The church, designed by Thomas Trubshaw, is built in local sandstone and has a slate roof. It consists of a nave, a south porch, a chancel, and a north vestry. At the east end is a large rose window and a tall double bellcote, and at the west end are three stepped lancet windows.
