= Listed buildings in Marston, Milwich =

Marston is a civil parish in the Borough of Stafford, Staffordshire, England. It contains two listed buildings that are recorded in the National Heritage List for England. Both the listed buildings are designated at Grade II, the lowest of the three grades, which is applied to "buildings of national importance and special interest". The listed buildings are a house and a church.

== Buildings ==
Name and location	Photograph	Date	Notes
Enson House; 52.85971°N 2.09435°W	—	Early 17th century (probable)	The house has a timber framed core, it was altered and faced in brick in the 18th century, and has a tiled roof. There are two storeys and an attic, and a T-shaped plan, with a front of four bays, and projecting gabled wings. The windows are casements, and on the east side is a massive chimney shaft.
St Leonard's Church; 52.84677°N 2.11858°W		1794	The chancel of the church is in brick, and the nave is in local grey sandstone, with some re-used masonry, and the roof is tiled. The church consists of a nave, a west porch, a lower and narrower chancel, and a north vestry. On the west gable is a timber bellcote. The windows on the south side of the nave have round heads, and the north wall is blank. The east window also has a round head, and in the vestry is a two-light small-paned casement window.
