= Stoke upon Trent Rural District =

Former local government area in the UK

Coordinates: 53.02°N 2.14°W

Stoke upon Trent
- Area
  - 1901: 3,270 acres (13.2 km²)
  - 1921: 3,270 acres (13.2 km²)
- Population
  - 1901: 4,279
  - 1921: 5,009
- History
  - Created: 1894
  - Abolished: 1922
  - Succeeded by: Stoke-on-Trent County Borough, Cheadle Rural District
- Status: Rural district

Stoke upon Trent Rural District was a rural district in Staffordshire. It was created in 1894 and consisted of two civil parishes, Bagnall and Stoke Rural. Both parishes and the district were abolished in 1922, being absorbed into the county borough of Stoke-on-Trent and the Cheadle Rural District.
