= Listed buildings in Creswell, Staffordshire =

Creswell is a civil parish in the Borough of Stafford, Staffordshire, England. It contains two listed buildings that are recorded in the National Heritage List for England. Both the listed buildings are designated at Grade II, the lowest of the three grades, which is applied to "buildings of national importance and special interest". The parish contains the village of Creswell and the surrounding area. The listed buildings consist of the remains of a church, and a milestone.

== Buildings ==
Name and location	Photograph	Date	Notes
Remains of parish church 52.83195°N 2.15572°W		15th century	The remains consist of part of the chancel of the church. They are in sandstone, and contain two lancet windows in the north wall. In the east wall is the outline of the east window. The remains are also a scheduled monument.
Milestone; 52.83468°N 2.13368°W		1761	On the site is a milestone and a milepost. The milestone is rectangular, in sandstone, with an arched top, and no apparent lettering. The milepost dates from the early 19th century, it has a triangular section and a domed top. The top is inscribed "TILLINGTON", and below are two angled plates indicating the distances to Stone and to Stafford.
