= Listed buildings in Fradswell =

Fradswell is a civil parish in the Borough of Stafford, Staffordshire, England. It contains two listed buildings that are recorded in the National Heritage List for England. Both the listed buildings are designated at Grade II, the lowest of the three grades, which is applied to "buildings of national importance and special interest". The parish contains the village of Fradswell and the surrounding area. The listed buildings consist of a church and a house.

== Buildings ==
| Name and location | Photograph | Date | Notes |
|---|---|---|---|
| Church of St James the Less; 52.87857°N 2.01349°W | | c. 1200 | The oldest part of the church is the chancel. The nave was rebuilt and the tower added in 1764, and the church was restored and additions were made, including the south aisle, the vestry and the stair turret, in 1852. The upper stage of the tower and the north wall of the nave are in brick, the rest of the church is in local grey sandstone, and the roofs are tiled. The church consists of a nave, a wide south aisle, a lower and narrower chancel, a northeast vestry, and a west tower. The tower has a west doorway, a coped parapet, and a saddleback roof. |
| Fradswell Hall; 52.87906°N 2.01427°W | — | c. 1800 | The house has plastered walls and a hipped slate roof, and is in later Georgian style. There are two storeys and three bays. On the front is a porch with Doric columns and a flat roof, and the windows are sashes. |

== Sources ==
- Historic England, "Church of St James the Less, Fradswell (1259929)", National Heritage List for England
- Historic England, "Fradswell Hall, Fradswell (1259884)", National Heritage List for England
- Historic England, Listed Buildings
- Pevsner, Nikolaus (1974), Staffordshire, The Buildings of England, Harmondsworth: Penguin Books, ISBN 0-14-071046-9
