= Listed buildings in Standon, Staffordshire =

Standon is a civil parish in the Borough of Stafford, Staffordshire, England. It contains 19 listed buildings that are recorded in the National Heritage List for England. Of these, one is listed at Grade I, the highest of the three grades, one is at Grade II*, the middle grade, and the others are at Grade II, the lowest grade. The parish contains the village of Standon and the surrounding countryside. In the parish is Mill Meece Pumping Station, and six buildings on its site are listed. The other listed buildings consist of two churches, and houses, cottages, and farmhouses, the earlier of which are timber framed or have timber framed cores.

== Key ==
Grade	Criteria
I	Buildings of exceptional interest, sometimes considered to be internationally important
II*	Particularly important buildings of more than special interest
II	Buildings of national importance and special interest

== Buildings ==
Name and location	Photograph	Date	Notes	Grade
All Saints Church; 52.91189°N 2.26987°W		12th century	The tower was added in the 14th century, and the church was restored in 1846–47 by George Gilbert Scott, who also possibly rebuilt the chancel. The church consists of a nave with a clerestory, north and south aisles, a south porch, a chancel with a vestry, and a west tower. The tower and the south aisle have embattled parapets. Parts of the west wall of the nave, the north aisle, and the north doorway are Norman in style.	I
Cotes Lodge; 52.91887°N 2.25078°W	—	17th century	The house was refronted in the 18th century. It is in red brick with a modillion eaves cornice, and a tile roof, hipped at the front, and with a coped gable at the rear. There are three storeys and three bays. The doorway has a rectangular fanlight and a small weather hood, and the windows are sashes with cambered heads. Inside, there is an inglenook fireplace.	II
Old Post Office; 52.91206°N 2.27856°W	—	17th century	The former post office, later a private house, is timber framed with brick infill on a stone plinth, and has a tile roof. There is one storey and an attic, and three bays. The windows are renewed casements, there is a small oriel window above the doorway, and two gabled dormers, the left one with a bowed front.	II
Rock Cottages; 52.91206°N 2.27856°W		17th century	A row of three cottages that were altered in the 19th century, they are in stone on an outcrop of bedrock, and were heightened in brick. There are two storeys and three bays. The windows are casements with cambered heads, those in the upper storey under gables with bargeboards and pendants.	II
Standon Old Hall; 52.91611°N 2.29295°W	—	17th century	The house, which has been much altered and extended, is in timber framing and brick, mainly roughcast, and has a tile roof. There are two storeys and attics, the upper storey and attics being jettied. On the front are four bays, the left bay being a later gabled cross-wing. The third and fourth bays also have gables that are smaller, and the doorway has an arched head. The windows are mullioned casements projecting on brackets, and in the second bay is a gabled dormer.	II
Weston Hall; 52.92762°N 2.29412°W	—	18th century	A red brick farmhouse with dentilled eaves and a tile roof. There are three storeys, four bays, and flanking gabled two-storey single-bay wings. On the front is a gabled porch, the doorway has a plain surround and a rectangular fanlight, and the windows are casements with cambered heads.	II
Cotes Hall; 52.91330°N 2.25675°W	—	c. 1788	A red brick house with a front of engraved cement, pilasters between the bays, and a coped parapet. There is a range of two storeys and three bays, and a three-storey wing with a stone-coped cornice to the left. The doorway has a moulded surround, a rectangular fanlight, and a porch with a cornice hood. The windows are sashes with plain lintels, and in the wing is a canted bay window.	II
Walford Hall; 52.90272°N 2.27094°W	—	1793	A red brick house with a tile roof, three storeys and four bays. On the front is a porch, the doorway has a plain surround and a rectangular fanlight, and the windows are casements with cambered heads. In the middle floor is a datestone.	II
Weston House Farmhouse; 52.92613°N 2.28979°W		1820	The farmhouse, which may incorporate 18th-century material, is in red brick with a sawtooth eaves cornice, and a tile roof with pedimented gables. There are three storeys, three bays, a single-storey single-bay extension on the left, and at the rear is a two-storey gabled wing and an outshut. On the front is a gabled porch with a datestone above, and the windows are casements, those in the lower two floors with cambered heads.	II
St James' Church, Cotes Heath; 52.91255°N 2.24858°W		1837	The chancel was added in 1891 by Charles Lynam. It is a low church, built in sandstone, and has a tile roof. The church consists of a nave, a south porch, a lower chancel, and a north vestry. On the west gable is a bellcote.	II
The Old Rectory; 52.91081°N 2.27130°W	—	c. 1840	The house is in engraved stucco, with a slate roof that has gables with ornamental bargeboards and finials. There are three storeys, three bays, and a west wing. In the centre is a porch and a doorway with a rectangular fanlight that is flanked by canted bay windows. In the upper floors are sash windows, and the wing contains a bay window tiered over two-storeys.	II
Standon Hall; 52.91554°N 2.28641°W		1910–11	A country house, later used for other purposes, it was designed by James Francis Doyle in Elizabethan style. The house is in sandstone with stone-slate roofs, and has an L-shaped plan. The main block has two storeys, and the service block at right angles is lower and with three storeys. The windows are mullioned and transomed, and the doorway has a pointed arch and a vaulted porch.	II
Lodge, Standon Hall; 52.91498°N 2.28322°W		c. 1914	The lodge is in sandstone with sprocket eaves and a slate roof. There is a single storey and an attic, and the lodge is in Tudor style. The south front is gabled, and contains a canted bay window and a three-light mullioned window above. Facing the drive is a projecting gabled porch with buttresses and a pointed arched doorway.	II
Chimney and flue, Mill Meece Pumping Station; 52.90269°N 2.25393°W		c. 1914	The chimney is to the northeast of the engine house, and is linked to the boiler house by a flue. The chimney has an octagonal plan, it is in Accrington brick with stone dressings, a string course, and a moulded cornice. The chimney tapers, and has a height of 38.4 metres (126 ft) The flue is in brick and concrete, and it extends for about 32 metres (105 ft).	II
Engine House and Boiler House, Mill Meece Pumping Station; 52.90250°N 2.25385°W		c. 1914	The pumping station was built by the Staffordshire Potteries Waterworks Company, and later became a museum. The engine house and boiler house are in Accrington brick with stone dressings and tile roofs. They have a single storey, and form a T-shaped plan. The buildings have chamfered stone plinth bands, the windows and doorways have round heads with keystones, and the windows have chamfered stone lintels. By the boiler house is a boiler feed pump room with a pyramidal roof, and to the southwest of the engine house is a rocking quadrant enclosed by a steel-framed superstructure.	II*
Gates and gate piers, Mill Meece Pumping Station; 52.90182°N 2.25462°W	—	c. 1914	The gates and gate piers are at the entrance to the site. The gate piers are in brick and the gates are in cast iron. The gates have vertical bars with a stepped geometric design above the top rail and applied lettering spelling out the name of the company.	II
Weigh House and Weighbridge, Mill Meece Pumping Station; 52.90213°N 2.25347°W	—	c. 1914	The weigh house is in Accrington brick with stone dressings and a tile roof. There is a single storey and a rectangular plan. The doorway and windows are round headed with keystones, the windows being casements with chamfered lintels. Inside is the original weighing machine, and to the northwest is an iron weighbridge.	II
Winch House, Mill Meece Pumping Station; 52.90228°N 2.25395°W	—	c. 1914	The winch house is in Accrington brick on a chamfered stone plinth, with stone dressings, quoins, and a pyramidal tile roof. There is a single storey and a square plan. The doorway and windows are round headed with keystones, the windows being casements with chamfered lintels. There are two rectangular openings for the winch rope, and inside is a steam-powered winch.	II
Workshop and Storehouse; Mill Meece Pumping Station; 52.90237°N 2.25340°W	—	c. 1914	The workshop and storehouse is in Accrington brick on a chamfered stone plinth, with stone dressings, quoins, and a hipped tile roof with a louvred vent. There is a single storey and a rectangular plan. The doorway and paired windows are round headed with keystones, the windows being casements with chamfered lintels.	II
