= Stone Rural District =

Former local government area in the UK

Coordinates: 52.9°N 2.17°W

- Area
  - 1911: 67,356 acres (272.58 km^{2})
  - 1961: 61,237 acres (247.82 km^{2})
- Population
  - 1901: 13,959
  - 1971: 22,144
- History
  - Created: 1894
  - Abolished: 1974
  - Succeeded by: Borough of Stafford
- Status: Rural district

Stone Rural District was a rural district in Staffordshire, England. It was created in 1894 and abolished by virtue of the Local Government Act 1972 in 1974. It was originally formed of the civil parishes of Barlaston, Chebsey, Cold Norton, Eccleshall, Milwich, Sandon, Standon, Stone Rural, Swynnerton and Trentham. In 1897 two new civil parishes were added, Fulford and Hilderstone.

In 1922, Hanford and most of Trentham were transferred to Stoke-on-Trent County Borough. In 1932 Cold Norton was abolished with two changes to the district whereby parts of Swynnerton and Trentham were transferred to Newcastle-under-Lyme Rural District and parts of Stone Rural moved into Stone Urban District. In 1956 more of Stone Rural was transferred into Stone Urban District. Finally, in 1965 parts of Barlaston, Fulford and Swynnerton transferred into Stoke-on-Trent. On abolition the remaining areas became part of the Borough of Stafford.
