= Newport Rural District =

Historical rural district

Coordinates: 52.769°N 2.379°W

Newport was a rural district in Shropshire, England from 1894 to 1934.

It was formed under the Local Government Act 1894 from that part of the Newport rural sanitary district which was in Shropshire (the rest, in Staffordshire, forming the Gnosall Rural District.)

It was abolished in 1934 under a County Review Order, and was merged into the Wellington Rural District.
