= 2023 Stafford Borough Council election =

2023 UK local government election

- 4 May 2023

All 40 seats to Stafford Borough Council 21 seats needed for a majority

	First party	Second party	Third party
Leader	Patrick Farrington	Aidan Godfrey	Robert Kenney
Party	Conservative	Labour	Stafford Ind.
Last election	22 seats, 48.5%	10 seats, 27.2%	N/A
Seats before	20	10	8
Seats won	14	13	7
Seat change	▼8	▲3	▲7
Popular vote	20,843	16,764	10,094
Percentage	36.1%	29.1%	17.6%
Swing	▼12.4%	▲1.9%	N/A
	Fourth party	Fifth party	Sixth party
Party	Green	Liberal Democrats	Independent
Last election	1 seat, 3.0%	0 seats, 0.9%	7 seats, 14.7%
Seats before	1	0	1
Seats won	5	1	0
Seat change	▲4	▲1	▼7
Popular vote	7,704	1,417	107
Percentage	13.4%	2.5%	0.2%
Swing	▲10.4%	▲1.6%	▼14.5%
- Winner of each seat at the 2023 Stafford Borough Council election
Leader before election
Patrick Farrington
Conservative
No overall control
Leader after election
Aidan Godfrey
Labour
No overall control

The 2023 Stafford Borough Council election took place on 4 May 2023 to elect members of Stafford Borough Council in Staffordshire, England. This was on the same day as other local elections across England.

The council remained under no overall control, but went from being run by a Conservative minority administration to being run by a coalition of Labour, local party the Stafford Borough Independents, and the Greens.

== Overview ==
The council had been under no overall control prior to the election, being run by a Conservative minority administration. The Conservatives had won a majority of the seats at the previous election in 2019, but lost their majority in March 2022 when two councillors left the party to sit as independents. Shortly before the election, eight of the nine independent councillors registered as a new localist party called the Stafford Borough Independents.

The council remained under no overall control after the election. The Conservative leader of the council, Patrick Farrington, lost his seat. The Labour group leader, Aidan Godfrey, was appointed the new leader of the council at the subsequent annual council meeting on 13 May 2023 with support from the Greens and Stafford Borough Independents, with those three parties each taking positions on the council's cabinet.

== Overall results ==
The overall results were:

2023 Stafford Borough Council election
Party	Candidates	Seats	Gains	Losses	Net gain/loss	Seats %	Votes %	Votes	+/−
Conservative	39	14	0	8	▼8	35.0	36.1	20,843	–12.4
Labour	32	13	3	0	▲3	32.5	29.1	16,764	+1.9
Stafford Ind.	14	7	7	0	▲7	17.5	17.5	10,094	N/A
Green	24	5	4	0	▲4	12.5	13.4	7,704	+10.4
Liberal Democrats	3	1	1	0	▲1	2.5	2.5	1,417	+1.6
Reform	7	0	0	0	Steady	0.0	1.3	777	N/A
Independent	3	0	0	7	▼7	0.0	0.2	107	–14.5

== Ward results ==
The Statement of Persons Nominated, which details the candidates standing in each ward, was released by Stafford Borough Council following the close of nominations on 5 April 2023. The results for each ward were as follows, with an asterisk (*) indicating an incumbent councillor standing for re-election.

=== Barlaston ===
Barlaston
Party	Candidate	Votes	%	±%
Conservative	Evan Jones*	368	54.0	−22.4
Labour	Richard Sidley	209	30.7	N/A
Green	Karen Davies	104	15.3	N/A
Majority		159	23.3	
Turnout		681	30.3	
Rejected ballots		5	0.7	
Conservative hold		Swing		

=== Baswich ===
Baswich (2 seats)
Party	Candidate	Votes	%	±%
Conservative	Ann Edgeller*	915	49.9	−13.9
Conservative	Marnie Phillips*	688	37.5	−10.2
Labour	Alison Carr	633	34.5	+4.4
Labour	Kulwant Kang	524	28.6	−0.6
Stafford Ind.	Maria Davies	357	19.5	N/A
Stafford Ind.	Paul Woodhead	346	18.9	N/A
Green	Timothy Boardman	205	11.2	N/A
Turnout			39.6	
Rejected ballots		11	0.3	
Conservative hold				
Conservative hold				

=== Common ===
Common
Party	Candidate	Votes	%	±%
Labour Co-op	Aidan Godfrey*	439	63.0	+13.6
Conservative	Peter Martin	178	25.5	+9.0
Green	Daniel Laidler	80	11.5	−5.9
Majority		261	37.5	
Turnout		697	23.3	
Rejected ballots		2	0.3	
Labour Co-op hold		Swing		

=== Coton ===
Coton (2 seats)
Party	Candidate	Votes	%	±%
Labour Co-op	Louise Nixon*	645	68.3	+8.3
Labour Co-op	Ant Reid	564	59.7	−4.6
Conservative	Neil Glover	214	22.7	−10.5
Conservative	Paul Startin	160	16.9	−15.4
Green	Michael Spight	131	13.9	N/A
Reform	Michael Riley	100	10.6	N/A
Reform	Steven Spennewyn	74	7.8	N/A
Turnout			19.7	
Rejected ballots		5	0.3	
Labour Co-op hold				
Labour Co-op hold				

=== Doxey and Castletown ===
Doxey and Castletown
Party	Candidate	Votes	%	±%
Green	Tony Pearce*	447	56.1	−2.7
Labour	Richard Duffy	146	18.3	+0.5
Conservative	James Brampton	97	12.2	−11.1
Independent	Eleanor Tristram	60	7.5	−10.3
Independent	Isabella Davies	47	5.9	−17.4
Majority		301	37.8	
Turnout		797	28.8	
Rejected ballots		4	0.5	
Green hold		Swing		

=== Eccleshall ===
Eccleshall (2 seats)
Party	Candidate	Votes	%	±%
Conservative	Jeremy Pert*	1,028	61.4	−3.0
Conservative	Peter Jones*	949	56.7	−5.0
Labour	Kate Hanley	591	35.3	+16.8
Labour	Sally Osborne-Town	444	26.5	N/A
Green	Gillian Douce	338	20.2	N/A
Turnout			33.6	
Rejected ballots		26	0.8	
Conservative hold				
Conservative hold				

=== Forebridge ===
Forebridge
Party	Candidate	Votes	%	±%
Labour Co-op	Julian Thorley	418	56.1	+15.6
Conservative	James Cantrill	188	25.2	N/A
Green	Robert Norman	139	18.7	N/A
Majority		230	30.9	
Turnout		745	28.0	
Rejected ballots		8	1.1	
Labour Co-op gain from Independent		Swing		

=== Fulford ===
Fulford (2 seats)
Party	Candidate	Votes	%	±%
Liberal Democrats	Alec Sandiford	693	54.5	+17.9
Conservative	Michael Dodson*	576	45.3	−10.9
Conservative	Lynne Bakker-Collier	515	40.5	−17.8
Liberal Democrats	Maria Moore	429	33.7	N/A
Labour	Charlie Nutt	331	26.0	+2.4
Turnout			30.2	
Rejected ballots		3	0.1	
Liberal Democrats gain from Conservative				
Conservative hold				

=== Gnosall and Woodseaves ===
Gnosall and Woodseaves (2 seats)
Party	Candidate	Votes	%	±%
Conservative	Mark Winnington*	962	48.6	−6.8
Green	Scott Spencer	926	46.8	N/A
Conservative	Patrick Farrington*	914	46.1	−10.4
Green	Dave Whittaker	828	41.8	N/A
Reform	Richard Harris	171	8.6	N/A
Reform	Susan Harris	160	8.1	−14.5
Turnout			38.0	
Rejected ballots		7	0.2	
Conservative hold				
Green gain from Conservative				

=== Haywood and Hixon ===
Haywood and Hixon (2 seats)
Party	Candidate	Votes	%	±%
Stafford Ind.	Brandan McKeown*	1,088	72.4	+33.8
Conservative	Andy Cooper	861	57.3	+22.8
Labour	Julian Porter	684	45.5	+29.2
Green	Victoria Door	373	24.8	N/A
Turnout			36.4	
Rejected ballots		6	0.2	
Stafford Ind. gain from Independent				
Conservative hold				

=== Highfields and Western Downs ===
Highfields and Western Downs (2 seats)
Party	Candidate	Votes	%	±%
Labour Co-op	Andy McNaughton	597	55.4	+1.8
Labour Co-op	Dee McNaughton*	548	50.9	−2.5
Conservative	Roy Clarke	358	33.2	−9.4
Conservative	Barbara Riddle	334	31.0	−11.4
Green	Jake Mahal	162	15.0	N/A
Green	Rosemary Musson	156	14.5	N/A
Turnout			23.3	
Rejected ballots		8	0.4	
Labour Co-op hold				
Labour Co-op hold				

=== Holmcroft ===
Holmcroft (2 seats)
Party	Candidate	Votes	%	±%
Labour	Frank James	797	49.9	+23.5
Conservative	Bryan Cross*	790	49.5	+0.4
Conservative	Jonathan Price*	783	49.0	−1.1
Labour	Mick Lupton	583	36.5	+14.0
Green	Jonathan Moore	242	15.1	+0.8
Turnout			31.2	
Rejected ballots		6	0.2	
Labour gain from Conservative				
Conservative hold				

=== Littleworth ===
Littleworth (2 seats)
Party	Candidate	Votes	%	±%
Labour Co-op	Gillian Pardesi*	775	58.6	+20.4
Labour Co-op	Tony Nixon*	704	53.2	+17.9
Conservative	Maria Redfern	370	28.0	−2.0
Conservative	William Taylor	370	28.0	+0.4
Green	Andrew Murray	202	15.3	−2.1
Reform	Michael Bailey	120	9.1	N/A
Reform	Martyn Garbett	106	8.0	N/A
Turnout			32.0	
Rejected ballots		5	0.2	
Labour Co-op hold				
Labour Co-op hold				

=== Manor ===
Manor (2 seats)
Party	Candidate	Votes	%	±%
Labour	Angela Loughran*	853	62.1	+8.5
Labour	Anne Hobbs*	785	57.2	+5.6
Conservative	Alex Oldridge	450	32.8	−10.2
Conservative	Robert Gwynn	432	31.5	−10.1
Green	Hayley Percival	227	16.5	N/A
Turnout			28.5	
Rejected ballots		12	0.4	
Labour hold				
Labour hold				

=== Milford ===
Milford
Party	Candidate	Votes	%	±%
Conservative	Peter Edgeller	444	48.6	−7.4
Labour	Nicholas Shaw	344	37.6	+14.9
Green	Katherine Dewey	126	13.8	−7.4
Majority		100	11.0	
Turnout		914	38.2	
Rejected ballots		5	0.5	
Conservative hold		Swing		

=== Milwich ===
Milwich (2 seats)
Party	Candidate	Votes	%	±%
Conservative	Frances Beatty*	836	49.2	−2.8
Conservative	Karine Aspin	752	44.2	−5.6
Stafford Ind.	Jim Davies	424	24.9	N/A
Labour	Kathryn Williams	414	24.4	+6.4
Stafford Ind.	Susan McKeown	403	23.7	N/A
Labour	Paul McGee	365	21.5	N/A
Green	Tom Harris	205	12.1	N/A
Turnout			34.5	
Rejected ballots		8	0.2	
Conservative hold				
Conservative hold				

=== Penkside ===
Penkside
Party	Candidate	Votes	%	±%
Labour	Ralph Cooke*	324	54.5	−8.1
Conservative	Anthony Boucker	169	28.4	−9.0
Green	Roisin Chambers	56	9.4	N/A
Reform	Fran Clark	46	7.7	N/A
Majority		155	26.1	
Turnout		595	23.7	
Rejected ballots		1	0.2	
Labour hold		Swing		

=== Rowley ===
Rowley
Party	Candidate	Votes	%	±%
Green	Doug Rouxel	496	41.3	+21.2
Conservative	Carolyn Trowbridge*	406	33.8	−18.3
Labour	Deborah Hawkes	300	25.0	−2.7
Majority		90	7.5	
Turnout		1,202	40.1	
Rejected ballots		7	0.6	
Green gain from Conservative		Swing		

=== Seighford and Church Eaton ===
Seighford and Church Eaton (2 seats)
Party	Candidate	Votes	%	±%
Green	Emma Carter	974	55.8	N/A
Green	Jack Rose	777	44.5	N/A
Conservative	Cathy Collier	710	40.7	−29.5
Conservative	Geoff Collier	681	39.0	−31.1
Labour	Joe McCormick	349	20.0	−8.6
Turnout		1,860	33.6	
Rejected ballots		9	0.3	
Green gain from Conservative				
Green gain from Conservative				

=== St Michaels and Stonefield ===
St Michaels and Stonefield (3 seats)
Party	Candidate	Votes	%	±%
Stafford Ind.	Rob Kenney*	1,323	59.8	+10.9
Stafford Ind.	Philip Leason*	1,306	59.0	+10.3
Stafford Ind.	Ian Fordham*	1,219	55.1	+11.1
Labour	Mike Osborne-Town	863	39.0	+20.5
Conservative	Simon Bell	795	35.9	+10.8
Conservative	Adrian Harding	679	30.7	+6.5
Conservative	Duncan Sandbrook	454	20.5	−3.3
Turnout			32.9	
Rejected ballots		18	0.3	
Stafford Ind. gain from Independent				
Stafford Ind. gain from Independent				
Stafford Ind. gain from Independent				

=== Swynnerton and Oulton ===
Swynnerton and Oulton (2 seats)
Party	Candidate	Votes	%	±%
Conservative	Roy James*	676	43.8	+43.8
Conservative	James Nixon*	546	35.4	+35.4
Labour	Adrian Holmes	435	28.2	N/A
Stafford Ind.	Kerry Dawson	356	23.0	N/A
Labour	Paul Warman	347	22.5	N/A
Liberal Democrats	Philip Jones	295	19.1	N/A
Stafford Ind.	Jason Metters	239	15.5	N/A
Green	Simon Capewell	195	12.6	N/A
Turnout			32.2	
Rejected ballots		3	0.1	
Conservative hold				
Conservative hold				

=== Walton ===
Walton (2 seats)
Party	Candidate	Votes	%	±%
Stafford Ind.	Jill Hood*	1,144	81.6	+7.8
Stafford Ind.	Jon Powell	658	46.9	−6.8
Labour	Bill Lockwood	536	38.2	+18.1
Conservative	Ivor Parry	252	18.0	−3.8
Conservative	Stephen Walker	213	15.2	−3.1
Turnout			27.7	
Rejected ballots		5	0.2	
Stafford Ind. gain from Independent				
Stafford Ind. gain from Independent				

=== Weeping Cross and Wildwood ===
Weeping Cross and Wildwood (2 seats)
Party	Candidate	Votes	%	±%
Stafford Ind.	Jenny Barron*	639	36.6	−24.3
Labour	Julie Read	630	36.1	−1.7
Stafford Ind.	Ray Barron*	592	33.9	−25.8
Labour	James Withington	587	33.6	−4.7
Conservative	Steph Travis	372	21.3	−39.6
Conservative	Lianne al-Khaldi	358	20.4	−39.3
Green	Sarah Matthews	189	10.8	N/A
Green	Martin Sandbrook	126	7.2	N/A
Turnout			38.0	
Rejected ballots		13	0.4	
Stafford Ind. gain from Conservative				
Labour gain from Conservative				

Jenny Barron and Ray Barron had both been elected as Conservatives in 2019 but left the party in March 2022 to sit as independents, subsequently joining the Stafford Borough Independents. Seats shown as gains from Conservative to allow comparison with 2019 results.

== Post-election changes ==
=== By-elections ===
==== Manor ====
Manor by-election: 16 July 2026 Death of Angela Loughran (Labour)
Party	Candidate	Votes	%	±%
Labour Co-op	Aaron Thurstance	481	36.2	−23.4
Reform	Ray Barron	414	31.2	N/A
Conservative	Freddie Crisp	237	17.8	−16.0
Green	Joe Tunnicliffe	197	14.8	−1.7
Majority		67	5.0	−22.5
Turnout		1,333	25.8	−2.7
Labour Co-op hold				
