= Mill Meece Pumping Station =

Pumping station in Millmeece, Staffordshire, England

Coordinates: 52.9025°N 2.2539°W

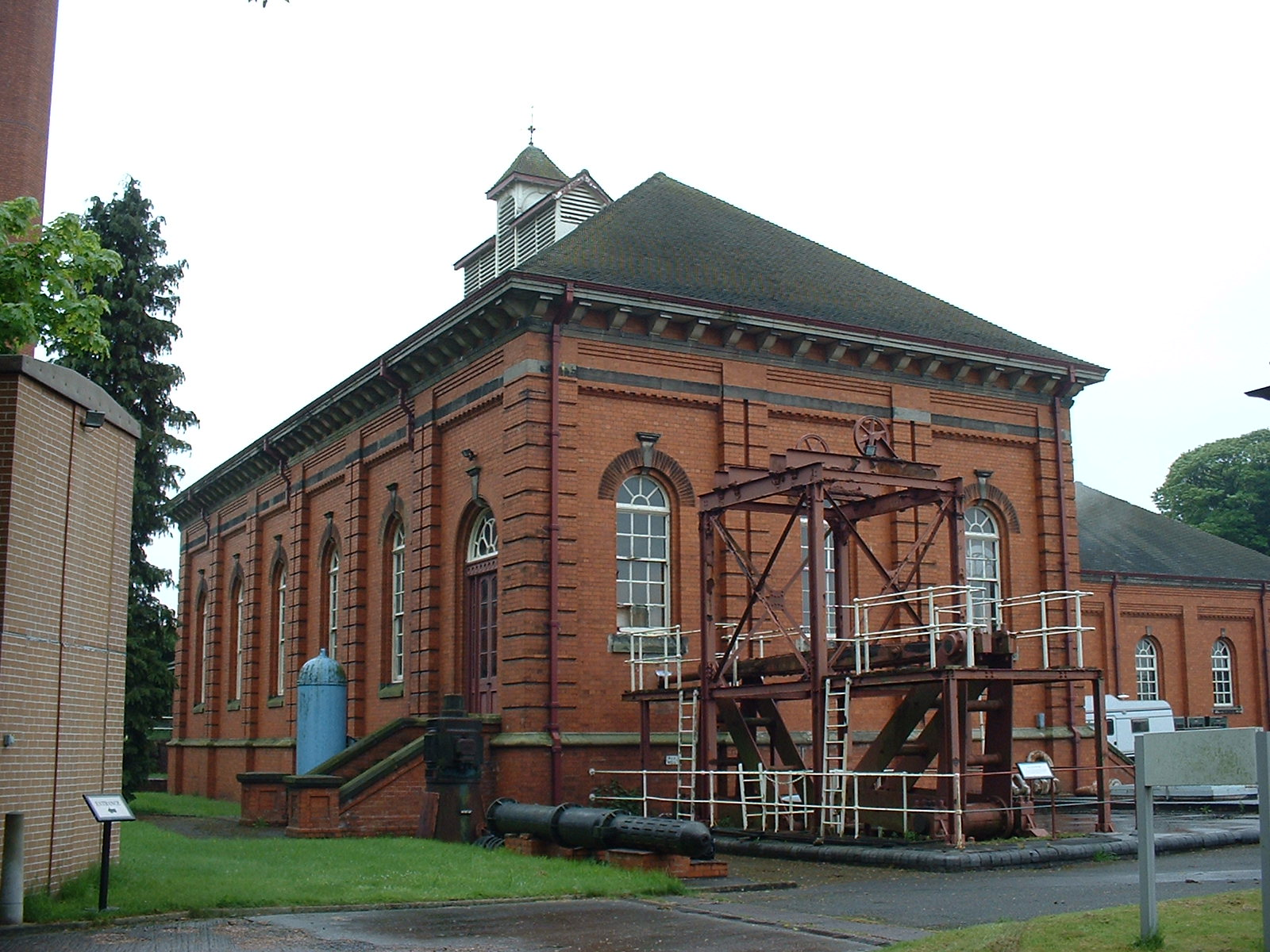
The exterior of Mill Meece Pumping Station

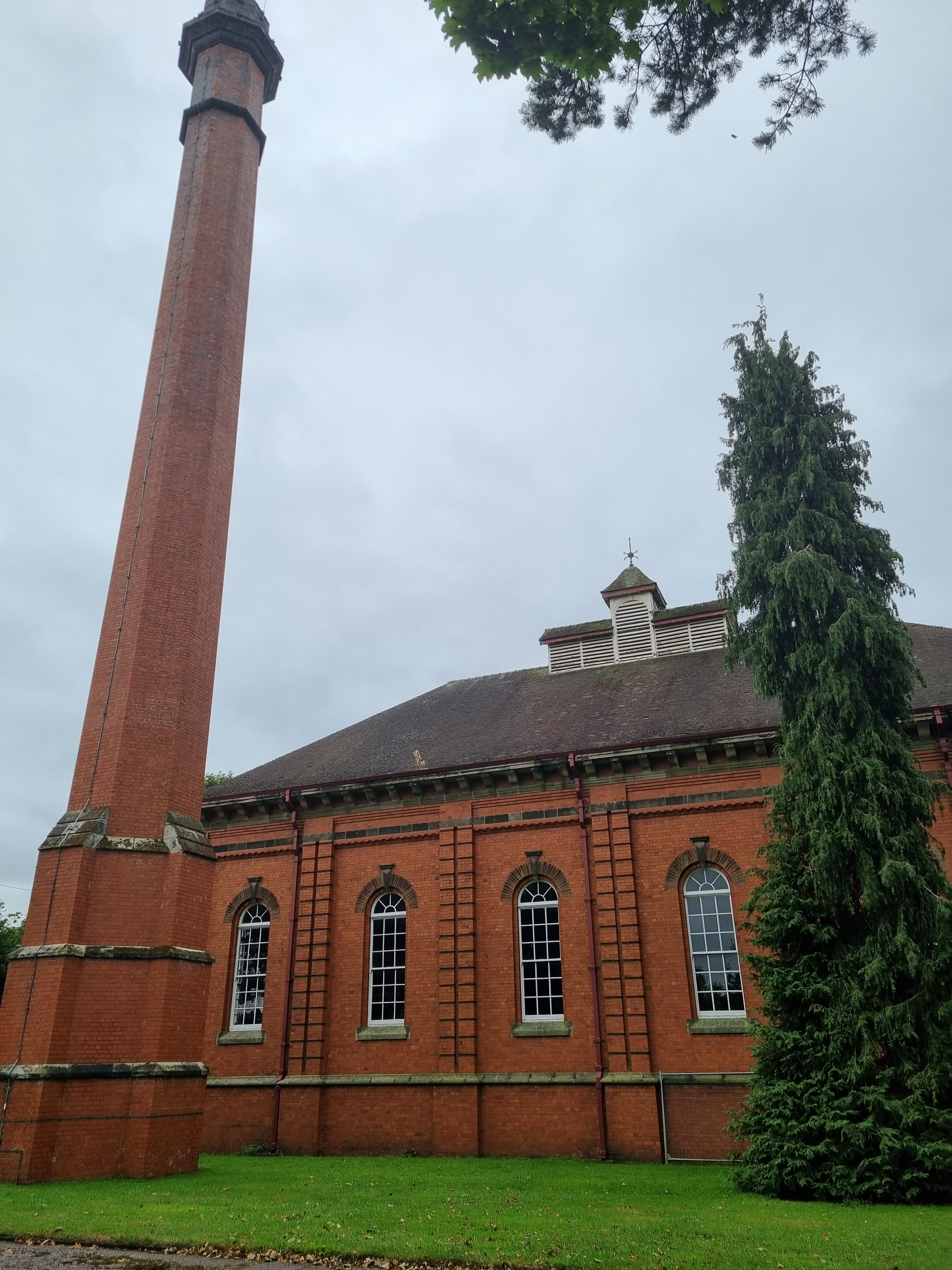
The Mill Meece Pumping Station from the north side.

Mill Meece Pumping Station is a pumping station, located in the village of Mill Meece in Staffordshire, England. Its function, powered by steam engines, was to pump water from boreholes to a reservoir in Hanchurch, from which it flows by gravity to supply the Potteries area.

== Description ==
Mill Meece pumping station lies approximately 5 miles west of Stone. It is the second pumping station to be constructed in the area, the first being three miles to the north in the hamlet of Hatton. There are four boreholes on the Mill Meece site from which water is lifted.

Water is raised at Mill Meece by lift pumps which deliver water to an underground tank. From there the water is lifted further by ram pumps. Both the lift and ram pumps are powered by two horizontal tandem compound Corliss valve engines using steam raised by three Lancashire boilers. The efficiency of steam-raising is increased by a Green's economiser.

== History ==
Construction of the pumping station was authorised by the Staffordshire Potteries Waterworks Act 1912 (2 & 3 Geo. 5. c. lxxv).

The pumping station was first put to work with one engine, two boreholes and two boilers in 1915 though did not pump to the public water supply until 1919. The second engine pumping from two new boreholes first pumped water in 1928. Both engines continued to operate until 22 December 1979. Water is still pumped from the Mill Meece site by electric pumps, but the steam engines remain in their original location.

The pumping station has seen extensive restoration since it was taken over by the Mill Meece Preservation Trust with the first open day being hosted on 30 May 1981.

On 18–19 July 2021 the middle boiler was returned to service and both the Ashton Frost Engine and Hathorn Davey Engine saw motion under steam once again.

== Visiting ==
Mill Meece pumping station is now operated by a charity, the Mill Meece Pumping Station Preservation Trust. The website listed below provides details of when it is open to the public.

== See also ==
- Listed buildings in Standon, Staffordshire
