= Gnosall Rural District =

Former English rural district

Coordinates: 52.80°N 2.31°W

Gnosall
- Area
  - 1911: 28,796 acres (116.53 km^{2})
  - 1931: 28,796 acres (116.53 km^{2})
- Population
  - 1901: 4,697
  - 1931: 4,732
- History
  - Created: 1894
  - Abolished: 1934
  - Succeeded by: Stafford Rural District; Cannock Rural District
- Status: Rural district

Gnosall was a rural district in Staffordshire, England from 1894 to 1934. It was formed under the Local Government Act 1894 from that part of the Newport Rural Sanitary District which was in Staffordshire (the rest forming Newport Rural District in Shropshire).

It consisted of the parishes of Adbaston, Church Eaton, Forton, Gnosall, High Offley, Norbury and Weston Jones.

The district was abolished in 1934 under a County Review Order. Most of it became part of the Stafford Rural District, with part going to Cannock Rural District. In 1940, there was a statue erected to commemorate the district.
