= Lichfield Rural District =

Former local government area in the UK

Lichfield was a rural district in the county of Staffordshire, England from 1894 to 1974.

It was enlarged in 1934 by gaining part of Staffordshire that had been administered since 1894 as part of Tamworth Rural District, which was otherwise in Warwickshire.
