= Cannock Rural District =

Rural district in Staffordshire, England

Coordinates: 52.69°N 2.14°W

Cannock was a rural district in Staffordshire, England, from 1894 to 1974.

It was created by the Local Government Act 1894, based on the Cannock rural sanitary district, and had the town of Cannock on its eastern border. In 1934 it was expanded by a County Review Order, gaining the civil parishes of Blymhill and Weston under Lizard, which had been administered by the Shifnal Rural District mainly in Shropshire.

The district was abolished in 1974 under the Local Government Act 1972, going on to form part of the South Staffordshire district.

== See also ==
- Gnosall Rural District
