= Newcastle-under-Lyme Rural District =

Former local government area in the UK

Coordinates: 52.96°N 2.34°W

- Area
  - 1901: 20,005 acres (80.96 km^{2})
  - 1961: 40,017 acres (161.94 km^{2})
- Population
  - 1901: 6,513
  - 1971: 20,691
- History
  - Created: 1894
  - Abolished: 1974
  - Succeeded by: Borough of Newcastle-under-Lyme
- Status: Rural district

Newcastle-under-Lyme Rural District was a rural district in the county of Staffordshire. It was formed in 1894 with the civil parishes of Ashley, Audley Rural, Balterley, Betley, Chapel and Hill Chorlton, Clayton, Keele, Madeley, Maer, Mucklestone, Tyrley and Whitmore. It was abolished in 1974, by virtue of the Local Government Act 1972, when it was absorbed into the Borough of Newcastle-under-Lyme.
