= Chapel and Hill Chorlton =

Civil parish in Staffordshire, England

Chapel and Hill Chorlton is a civil parish in the district of Newcastle-under-Lyme, Staffordshire, England. The parish contains the villages of Chapel Chorlton and Hill Chorlton, and the surrounding area. Stableford, a hamlet in the parish, is notable for being mentioned in John Ogilby's Britannia of 1675, one of the first road atlases of England and Wales. The cross-roads where the route from Lichfield to Chester took a dog-leg turn here (as does its modern counterpart, the A51 road) is marked by a mid- to late-19th century milepost, itself a Grade II listed structure (detailed below).

The parish contains eight listed buildings and structures that are recorded in the National Heritage List for England. All the listed buildings are designated at Grade II, the lowest of the three grades, which is applied to "buildings of national importance and special interest". The listed buildings and structures consist of a church, a memorial and a sundial in the churchyard, two farmhouses, a house that was formerly an inn, a former flour mill, and a milepost.

== Listed buildings in Chapel and Hill Chorlton ==
=== Buildings ===
| Name and location | Photograph | Date | Notes |
|---|---|---|---|
| St Lawrence's Church; 52.93688°N 2.27972°W | | Medieval | The oldest part of the church is the tower. This was remodelled in 1826–27 by James Trubshaw when he rebuilt the rest of the church in Classical style. The church is built in sandstone with a slate roof, and consists of a nave and a chancel in one unit, and a west tower. The tower has buttresses, a round-headed west window, a cornice, and a parapet with corner obelisks. The windows in the body of the church are also round-headed, above the south doorway is a pediment, and the east window is tripartite with a lunette above. |
| Green Farmhouse; 52.93882°N 2.28193°W | — | 15th century (possible) | The farmhouse, which has a timber framed core, possibly with cruck construction, was remodelled in about 1600, and altered and refaced in the 19th century. It is in yellowish-brown brick with a dentilled eaves cornice and a tile roof. There are two storeys, a front of three bays, and lean-to extensions on the left and at the rear. On the front is a gabled porch, and the windows are casements with plastered lintels. |
| Church House Farmhouse; 52.93768°N 2.27932°W | — | 17th century (probable) | The farmhouse, which probably has a timber framed core, has been considerably altered and extended. It is in painted brick with a dentilled eaves cornice, and a tile roof. There are two storeys, three bays. and a rear outshut. The windows are casements. |
| Former Cock Inn; 52.94566°N 2.27678°W | | Late 17th century | A house, at one time an inn, it has a timber framed core, it was extended in the 18th century, and further extended and remodelled in the 19th century. The house is partly in sandstone, clad in brick at the rear and with applied timber framing to the front, the rear wing is in brick, and the roof is tiled. There are two storeys, a front range of five bays, and a rear wing. In the centre is a doorway, and the windows are casements. Inside, there is exposed timber framing. |
| Chorlton Mill; 52.94982°N 2.27765°W | — | 1848 | A former flour mill, later used for other purposes, it is in sandstone, and has a slate Mansard roof with a flat top. The mill consists of a tower with a square plan, three storeys and a loft, a two-storey gabled projection to the south, and a later brick lean-to to the east. The entrance has a segmental head with a dated keystone, there are mullioned windows on the north front, an opening for a chute, and half-dormers, gabled on the south and east sides. |

=== Structures ===
| Name and location | Photograph | Date | Notes |
|---|---|---|---|
| Delves Memorial; 52.93701°N 2.27961°W | — | 1796 | The memorial is in the churchyard of St Lawrence's Church, and is to the memory of Revd. Joseph Delves. It is a chest tomb in sandstone, with oval inscription panels and moulded capping. The tomb is in an enclosure with wrought iron railings. |
| Milepost at NGR SJ 7214 3566; 52.94620°N 2.28412°W | — | Mid to late 19th century (probable) | The mile post is on the south side of the A51 road. It is in cast iron, and has a triangular section and a chamfered top. On the top is "STABLEFORD" and on the sides are the distances to Pipegate, Woore, Nantwich, and Stone. |
| Sundial; 52.93708°N 2.27960°W | — | Early to mid 19th century | The sundial is in the churchyard of St Lawrence's Church. It is in sandstone, and consists of an octagonal shaft on a square base, with a concave-sided cap. |
