= Cheadle Rural District =

Former rural district in Staffordshire, England

Coordinates: 52.99075°N 1.98705°W

- Rural district
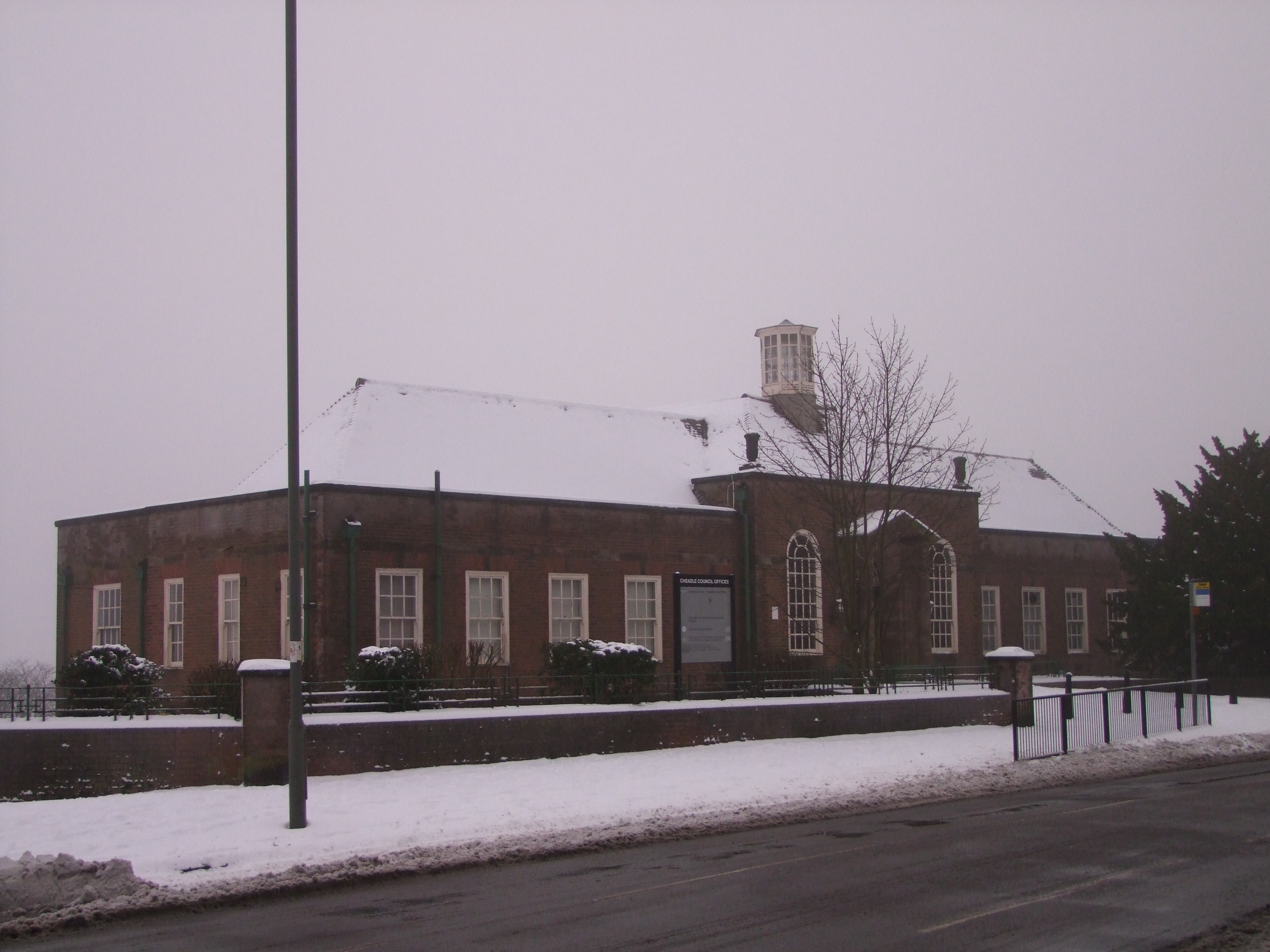
- Council Offices, 40 Leek Road, Cheadle
- Population
  - 1901: 24,657
  - 1971: 40,098
- History
  - Created: 28 December 1894
  - Abolished: 31 March 1974
  - Succeeded by: Staffordshire Moorlands
- Status: Rural district
  - HQ: Cheadle

Cheadle Rural District was a rural district in the administrative county of Staffordshire, England from 1894 to 1974, covering an area in the north of the county centred on the small town of Cheadle.

== Origins ==
The district had its origins in the Cheadle Poor Law Union, which had been created in 1837, covering Cheadle itself and several surrounding parishes. In 1872 sanitary districts were established, giving public health and local government responsibilities for rural areas to the existing boards of guardians of poor law unions. The Cheadle Rural Sanitary District was administered from Cheadle Union Workhouse, which had been built in 1775 on Bank Street.

Under the Local Government Act 1894, rural sanitary districts became rural districts from 28 December 1894. The district boundaries were adjusted in 1934 when the neighbouring Mayfield Rural District was abolished and there were other changes to the boundaries with neighbouring districts.

== Parishes ==
The district's civil parishes were:

- Alton
- Blore with Swinscoe (after 1934)
- Bradley in the Moors (until 1934)
- Cauldon (until 1934)
- Caverswall
- Cheadle
- Checkley
- Cheddleton
- Consall
- Cotton
- Denstone (until 1934)
- Dilhorne
- Draycott in the Moors
- Farley
- Forsbrook (Note: Created 1896 from part of Dilhorne)
- Ipstones
- Kingsley
- Oakamoor (Note: Created 1896 from parts of Cheadle, Cotton, Farley and Kingsley)
- Waterhouses (Note: Created 1934 by abolition of Cauldon and Waterfall parishes, with additional territory from parishes of Calton and Ilam)

== Premises ==
In the early years the council met at the board room of the workhouse, reflecting its origins in the poor law union. The council later built itself a new headquarters at 40 Leek Road (then also known as Greenhill), which was formally opened on 5 March 1937.

== Abolition ==
Cheadle Rural District was abolished under the Local Government Act 1972, merging with the Leek Rural District and the urban districts of Biddulph and Leek to become the new district of Staffordshire Moorlands. The former Cheadle Rural District Council offices at 40 Leek Road subsequently served as an area office for the new district council until being sold and converted into flats around 2015, with the old council chamber being retained in municipal use for meetings of Cheadle Town Council.
