= Standon, Staffordshire =

Village in Staffordshire, England

Coordinates: 52.912°N 2.277°W

Standon
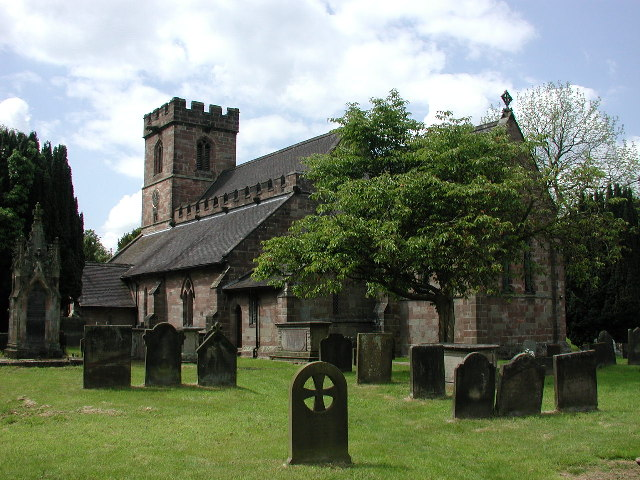

- Location within Staffordshire
- Population: 879 (2011)
- OS grid reference: SJ8140334997
- Civil parish: Standon
- District: Stafford
- Shire county: Staffordshire
- Region: West Midlands
- Country: England
- Sovereign state: United Kingdom
- Post town: Stafford
- Postcode district: ST21
- Dialling code: 01782
- Police: Staffordshire
- Fire: Staffordshire
- Ambulance: West Midlands
- UK Parliament: Stone

Standon is a village and civil parish in the Stafford district, in the county of Staffordshire, England. Standon has a church called Church of All Saints and one school called All Saints C of E First School. In 2001 the population of the civil parish of Standon was 823, and in the 2011 census it had a population of 879.

== History ==
Standon in Old English has a particular meaning which, when broken down means 'Stone Hill'. The elements in Old English are 'stān' which means a stone rock and 'dūn' which means a hill.

Dated to 1086, the Church of All Saints has been listed as a Grade One building. It was rebuilt in 1847, except the middle aisle and the tower. It has since been restored three times, with extensive work happening to the roof. The Church is a part of a benefice of churches, which is formed of four church parishes of Staffordshire villages. These four parishes are Cotes Heath, Swynnerton with Yarnfield, Standon and Tittensor, and these create the united family of 'The CoSST Churches'. The parishes are small Church of England parishes located 10 miles from the city of Stoke-on-Trent, in the Lichfield Diocese.

According to the Domesday Book from 1086, Standon had nine households which is considered quite small, with 11 villagers, three smallholders, three slaves and one priest. The Lord of Standon in 1086 was Brian of Rauceby and the recorded Tenant-in-Chief was Robert of Stafford. In 1086 there were six ploughlands, of which one was owned by the Lord of Standon and five were for men's plough teams. Prior to the Domesday Book, the Lord of Standon was recorded to be Siward in 1066.

John Marius Wilson described Standon in the Imperial Gazetteer of England and Wales as

" STANDON, a parish, with a village, in Stone district, Stafford; on the Northwestern railway, 4 miles NNW of Eccleshall. It has a r[ailway]. station, called Standon-Bridge, and a post-office under Eccleshall."

In 1885, The Standon Home was established as the only second boy's home in the Waifs and Strays' Society. Miss Maria Anderdon laid the foundation stone after she donated £2,000 to the new home. It initially housed 50 boys but after building work in 1892, numbers increased to 90, having built a new kitchen, a scullery and a large dormitory. The home was a purpose built farm and was well equipped to train boys in agricultural skills, with much of their produce sold at local markets along with a regular stall kept at Stoke-on-Trent. They cultivated over 50 acres of land which was leased from Thomas Salt MP. The Home (More accurately an approved school) closed in 1947 after a public inquiry. Nine pupils had murdered a teacher, then fled, on the afternoon of 15 February 1947. They had been trying to kill the headmaster, Thomas Dawson, but assistant master Peter Fieldhouse interrupted them and was shot 3 times by a pupil named Cawley. Fieldhouse lived long enough to give a full account of his killers, who were all caught later that day. The boys had been driven to this act because the Headmaster, Thomas Dawson was an authoritarian figure, who had implemented a strict and unjust regime at the School. He enforced collective punishments for minor crimes and misdemeanours; resisted granting licenses to older boys; and placed arbitrary restrictions on how pocket money was spent.The case of Standon Farm Approved School, 1947 - The Therapeutic Care Journal

Standon Hall, which was built circa 1910, to the design of Liverpool architect J. Francis Doyle, is a manor house located in Standon. The Hall was formerly owned and built for Sir Thomas Anderton Salt, a director of the North Staffordshire Railway company, but its use as a family home was short-lived, it being sold to Staffordshire County Council in 1925 for hospital use. In the 1930s pavilions for tuberculosis patients were built in the grounds whilst the principal activity at the site was orthopaedic treatment. Upon the opening of Stafford General Hospital in 1983, the NHS sold the property into the private sector and the manor house itself converted into a residential care home for up to 22 elderly ladies and gentlemen, with the outbuildings, by now known as "The Beeches", specialising in dementia care for an additional 21 elderly residents.

Standon was affected by boundary changes in the expansion of the neighbouring town of Eccleshall. On 1 April 1932, Standon's area was reduced by 439 acres which became part of Eccleshall.

The 1931 Census of England and Wales, County Report Part II described the boundary change as

" Areas altered between 26th April, 1931 and 30th June, 1934, showing constitution as at the latter date, in terms of constitution as at the former date, together with particulars of acreage and population".

== Demographics ==
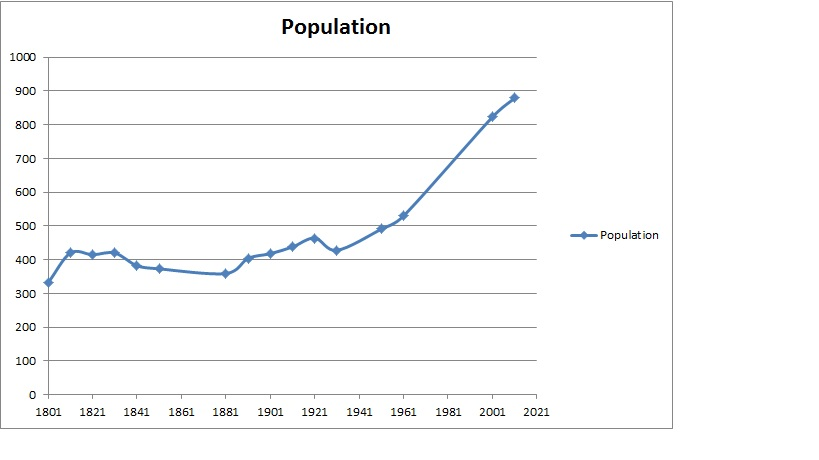
Total Population of Standon Civil Parish, Staffordshire, as reported by the Census of Population from 1801 to 2011.

The population of Standon saw little fluctuation between 1801 and 1931, with the lowest being 332 in 1801 and the highest being 464 in 1921. However, after 1931, there was a dramatic increase in population size even with the boundary change in 1932, meaning that the area of Standon decreased by 439 acres. The population in Standon in 1931 was 428 but increased exponentially to 879 in 2011.

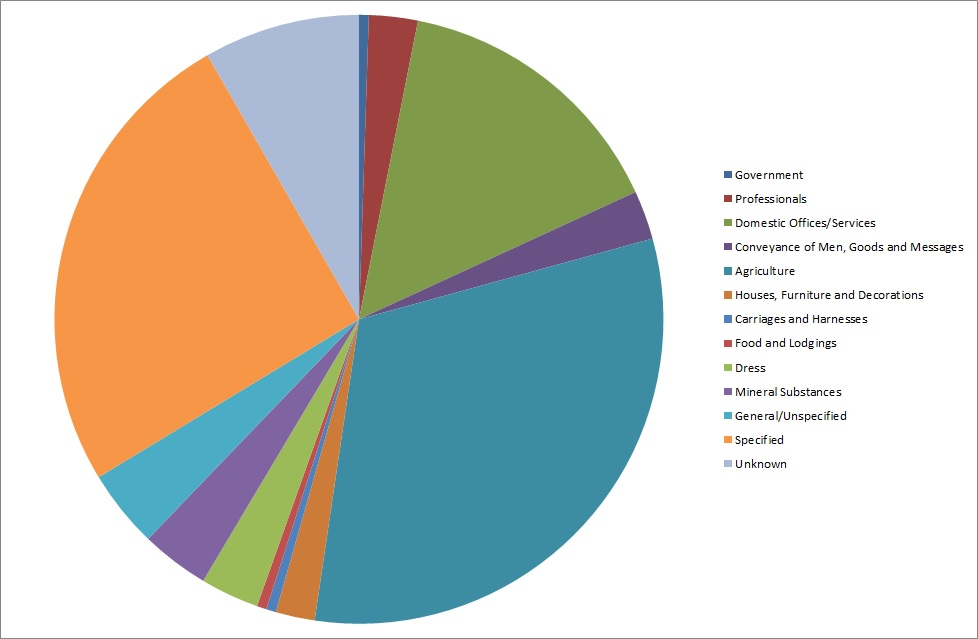
Occupations for Standon Civil Parish, as reported by the 1881 Census.

Since the 1881 census report, Standon has seen a shift in occupational employment in the 2011 census report. The 2011 census report shows that the most common profession is Human Health and Social Work with 78 persons employed in this field. In comparison, the 1881 census states the most common profession was agriculture with 31 persons employed in this field. In comparison, modern day Standon only has 35 persons employed in agriculture.

Occupations for Standon Civil Parish, as reported by the 2011 Census.

It is clearly shown that of the 451 residents in Standon between the ages of 16 and 74 who are in employment it can be seen that occupations in 2011 are more diverse than in 1881. In 1881 occupations were more labour-intensive in agriculture, dress-making and conveyance of goods. In 2011, occupations such as Human Health And Social Work and Wholesale and Retail Trade are on the rise, however agriculture and construction are still some of the main occupations in Standon.

== Present Day ==
All Saints C of E First School is the only school located in Standon. It provides education to boys and girls from the ages of five to nine. The school's capacity is 60 children and its religious character is Church of England. For secondary schools, the nearest to Standon are in Stoke-on-Trent and Stone.

The nearest operating railway station to Standon is Stone, followed by Stafford. There is limited road access, with the nearest major road being the A519 which runs through the neighbouring village of Cotes Heath.

From the last census in 2011, it was recorded that there were 332 dwellings in Standon of which the most common are the detached properties, with 180 in the parish. The censuses from 1831 to 1961 show an overall increase in dwellings. However between the years of 1851 and 1921 there was a decrease in the number of dwellings, but then the number increased to 115 in 1961.

== See also ==
- Listed buildings in Standon, Staffordshire
