= Borough of Stafford =

Local government district in Staffordshire, England

Coordinates: 52°48′18.05″N 2°6′59.99″W

- Non-metropolitan district and borough
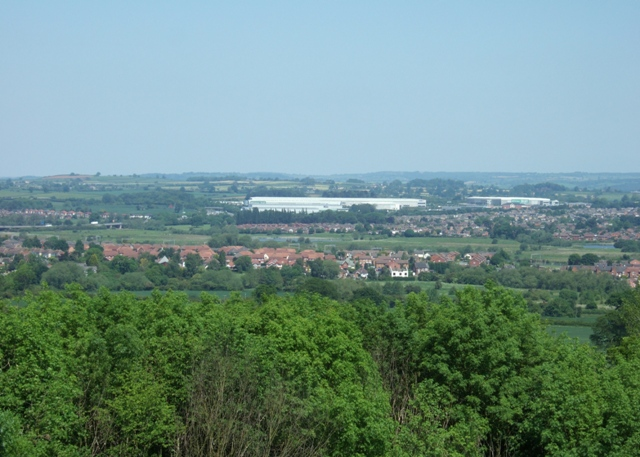
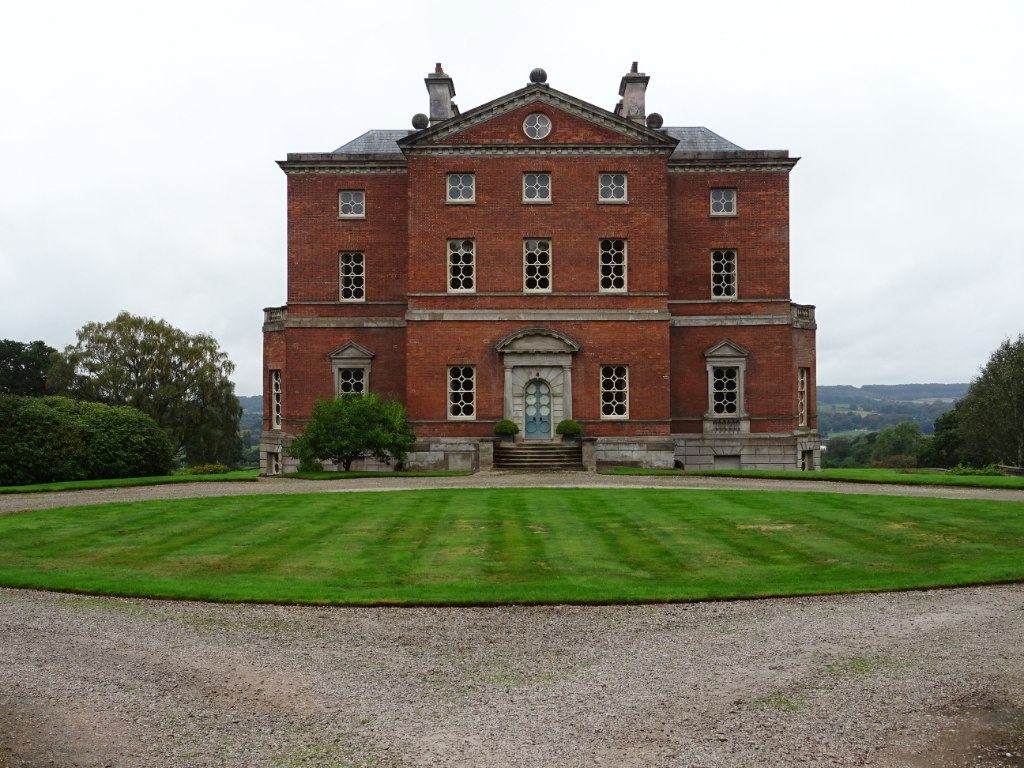
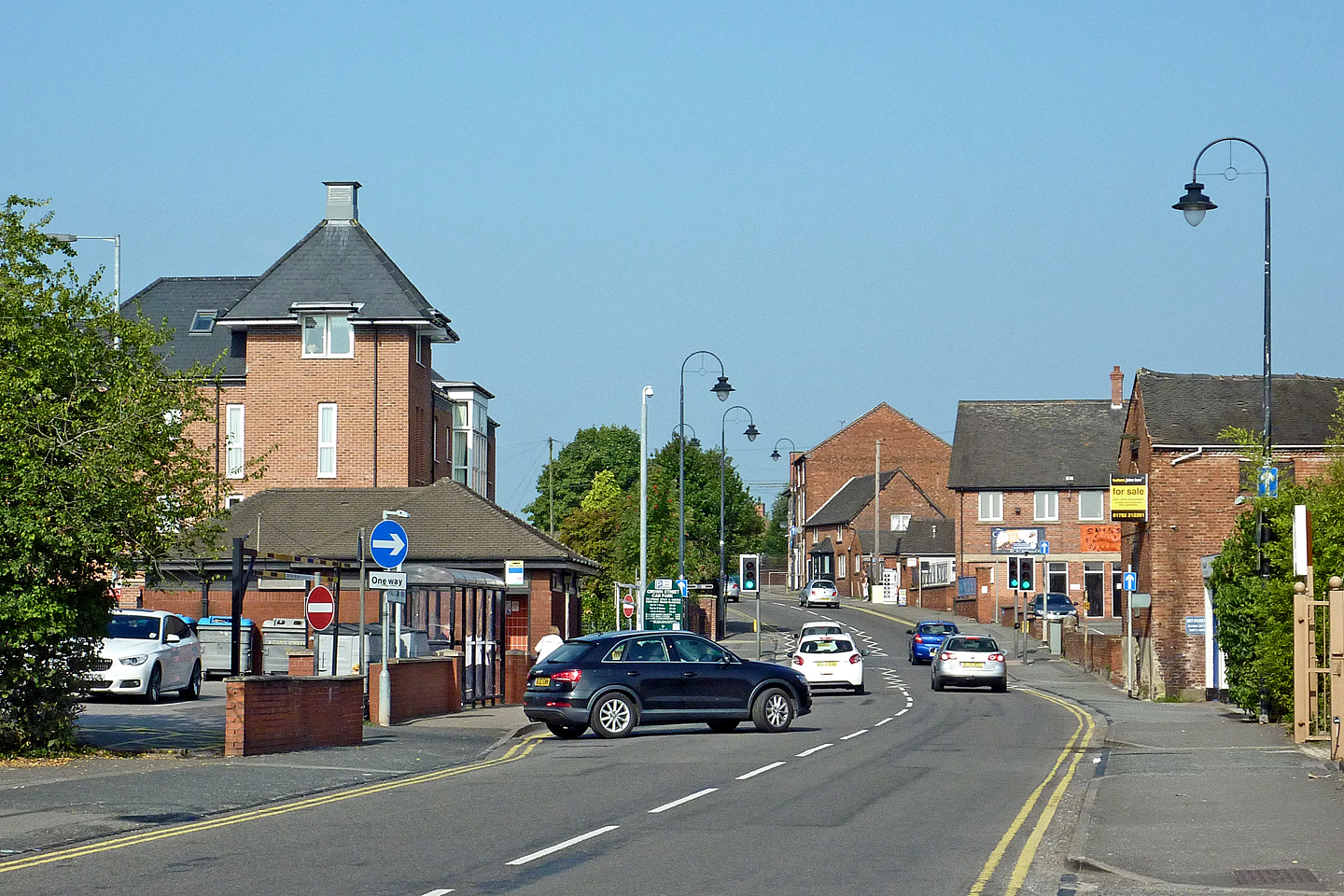
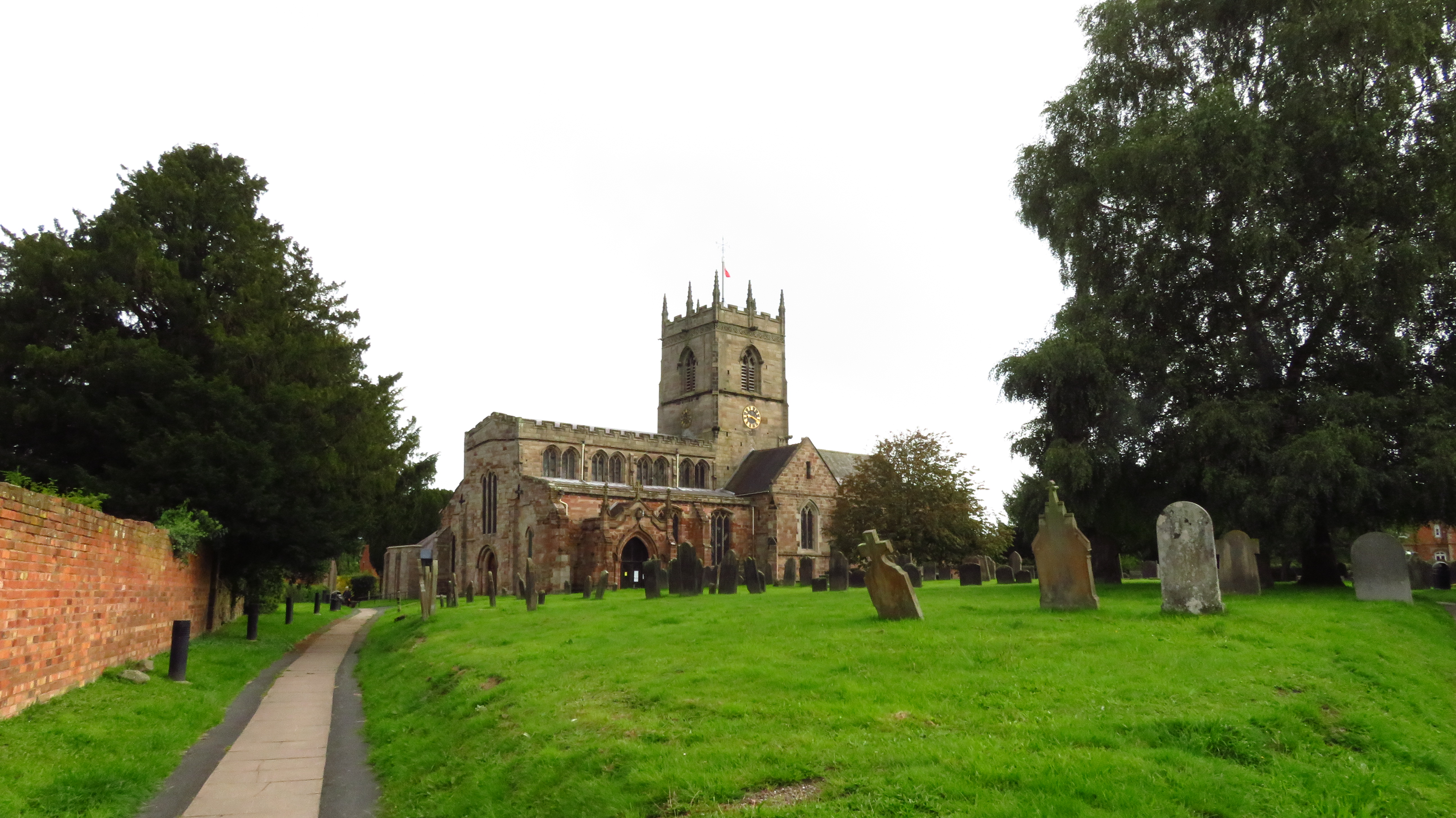
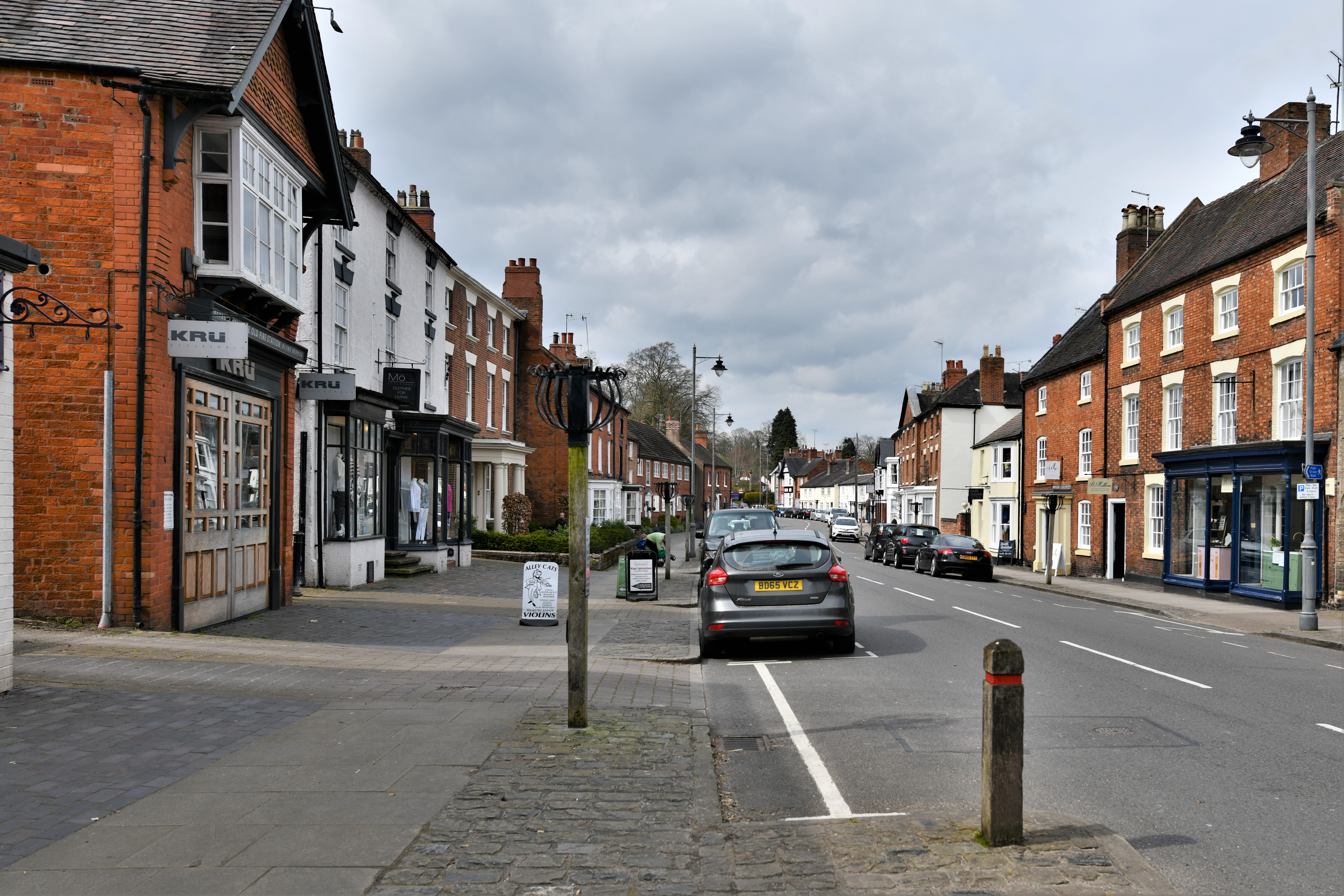
- From left to right; Top: Stafford skyline from Stafford Castle; Middle: Barlaston Hall in Barlaston and Crown Street in Stone; Bottom: St Lawrence's Church in Gnosall and High Street in Eccleshall

- Stafford shown within Staffordshire
- Sovereign state: United Kingdom
- Constituent country: England
- Region: West Midlands
- Non-metropolitan county: Staffordshire
- Status: Non-metropolitan district
- Admin HQ: Stafford

Government
  - Type: Non-metropolitan district council
  - Body: Stafford Borough Council
  - MP: Leigh Ingham

Area
  - Total: 231.0 sq mi (598.2 km^{2})
  - Rank: 59th (of 296)

Population (2025)
  - Total: 142,903
  - Rank: 166th (of 296)
  - Density: 618.7/sq mi (238.9/km^{2})

Ethnicity (2021)
  - Ethnic groups: List: 93.4% White; 3% Asian; 1.9% Mixed; 1.1% Black; 0.7% other

Religion (2021)
  - Religion: List: 54.3% Christianity; 36.9% no religion; 1.1% Islam; 0.9% Hinduism; 0.1% Judaism; 0.4% Sikhism; 0.4% Buddhism; 0.5% other; 5.4% not stated
- Time zone: UTC0 (GMT)
  - Summer (DST): UTC+1 (BST)
- ONS code: 41UG (ONS); E07000197 (GSS)
- OS grid reference: SJ9213623094

The Borough of Stafford is a local government district with borough status in Staffordshire, England. It is named after Stafford, its largest town, which is where the council is based. The borough also includes the towns of Stone and Eccleshall, as well as numerous villages and surrounding rural areas.

The neighbouring districts are Newcastle-under-Lyme, Stoke-on-Trent, Staffordshire Moorlands, East Staffordshire, Lichfield, Cannock Chase, South Staffordshire, Telford and Wrekin, and Shropshire.

== History ==
The town of Stafford was an ancient borough, being described as a borough in the Domesday Book of 1086. Its earliest surviving charter was issued by King John in 1206. Stafford was formally incorporated in 1614 by a charter from James I, which also granted the right to appoint a mayor.

The borough was reformed in 1836 to become a municipal borough under the Municipal Corporations Act 1835, which reformed many boroughs across the country. As part of those reforms the borough was enlarged to include the Forebridge area on the south bank of the River Sow, which had been added to the Stafford parliamentary borough (constituency) in 1832. The municipal borough was subsequently enlarged several times to take in the town's growing suburbs, most notably in 1917 when it gained areas including Tillington and in 1934 when it gained areas including Baswich.

The modern district was created on 1 April 1974, under the Local Government Act 1972 covering four former districts, which were all abolished at the same time:

- Stafford Municipal Borough
- Stafford Rural District
- Stone Rural District
- Stone Urban District.

The new district was named Stafford, after its largest town. Stafford's borough status transferred to the new district from its creation, allowing the chair of the council to take the title of mayor, continuing the borough's series of mayors dating back to 1614.

Many of the new borough's parishes had been within the historic Hundred of Pirehill.

== Abolition ==
Under current local government reorganisation plans, all district councils in Staffordshire, as well as the county council, will be abolished in 2028, with the district forming part of a new South and Mid Staffordshire unitary authority.

== Governance ==
Stafford Borough Council

Type
- Type: Non-metropolitan district

Leadership
- Mayor: Mark Winnington, Conservative since 16 May 2026
- Leader: Aidan Godfrey, Labour since 13 May 2023
- Chief Executive: Tim Clegg since 2016

Structure
- Seats: 40 councillors
- Graph of the party split among 40 seats.
- Political groups: Administration (19) Labour (12) Stafford Ind. (7) Other parties (21) Conservative (15) Green (5) Liberal Democrats (1)

Elections
- Voting system: First past the post
- Last election: 4 May 2023

Meeting place
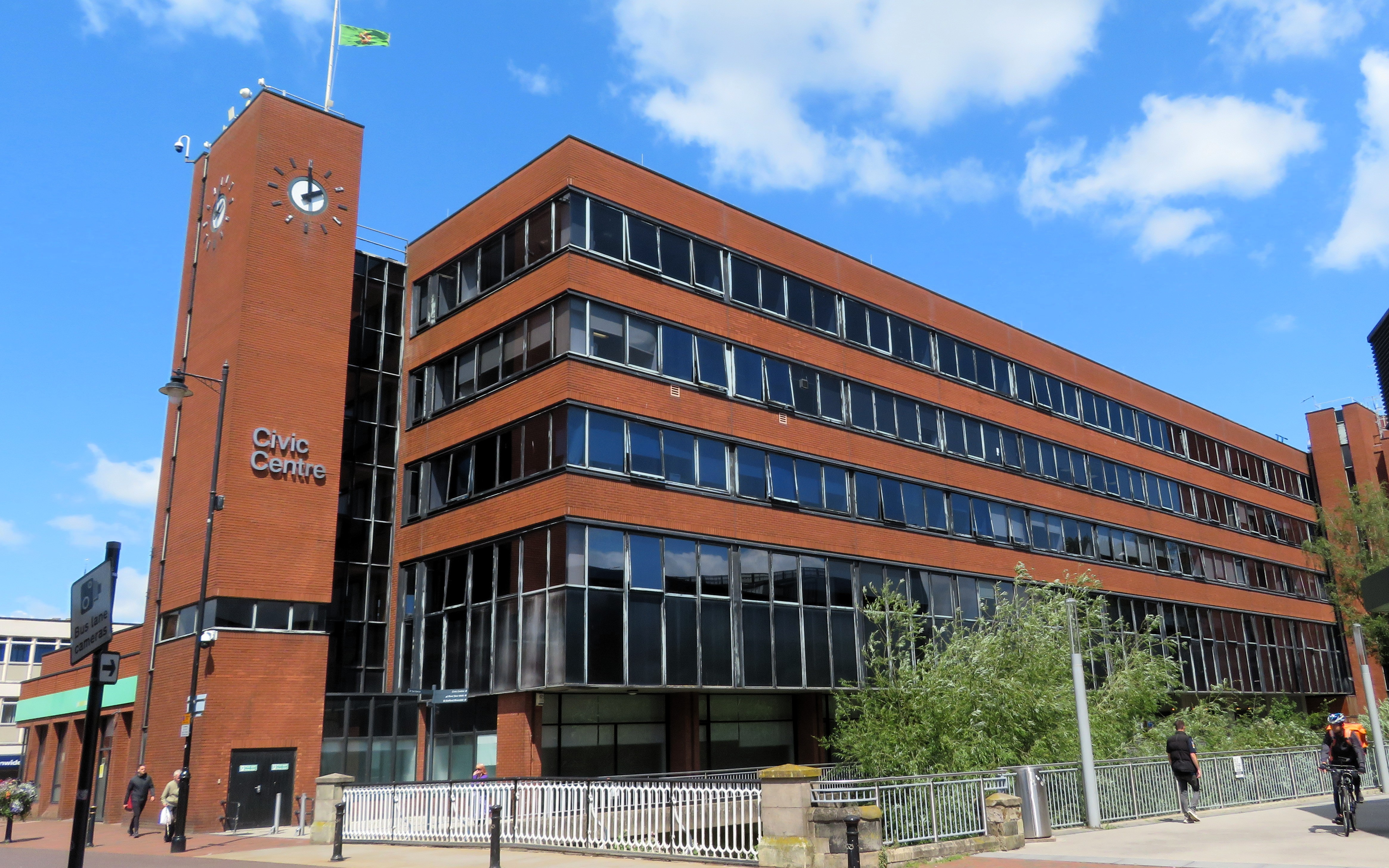
- Civic Centre, Riverside, Stafford, ST16 3AQ

Website
- www.staffordbc.gov.uk

Stafford Borough Council provides district-level services; county-level services are provided by Staffordshire County Council. Much of the borough is also covered by civil parishes, which form a third tier of local government.

=== Political control ===
The council has been under no overall control since 2022. Following the 2023 election a coalition of Labour, the Greens and local party the Stafford Borough Independents formed to take control of the council, led by Labour councillor Aidan Godfrey. The Greens left the coalition in November 2026 after a directive from the national Labour Party to local parties not to work with the Greens.

The first elections to the enlarged borough council were held in 1973, initially operating as a shadow authority alongside the outgoing authorities until the new arrangements came into effect on 1 April 1974. Political control of the council since 1974 has been as follows:

Party in control	Years
No overall control	1974–1995
Labour	1995–1999
No overall control	1999–2003
Conservative	2003–2022
No overall control	2022–present

=== Leadership ===
The role of mayor is largely ceremonial in Stafford. Political leadership is instead provided by the leader of the council. The leaders since 1974 have been:

Councillor	Party	From	To
Walter Dean	Conservative	1 Apr 1974	Jul 1991
Mike Heenan	Conservative	Sep 1991	Dec 1994
Walter Dean	Conservative	13 Dec 1994	May 1995
Jack Kemp	Labour	May 1995	2003
Judith Dalgarno	Conservative	12 May 2003	2009
Mike Heenan	Conservative	2009	20 Jan 2015
Patrick Farrington	Conservative	2015	May 2023
Aidan Godfrey	Labour	13 May 2023	

=== Composition ===
Following the 2023 election, and subsequent changes up to July 2026, the composition of the council is:

Party	Seats
Labour	12
Stafford Ind.	7
Green	5
Conservative	15
Liberal Democrats	1
Total	40

=== Elections ===
Since the last boundary changes in 2015 the council has comprised 40 councillors representing 23 wards, with each ward electing one, two or three councillors. Elections are held every four years.

=== Premises ===
The council is based at the Civic Centre on Riverside in the centre of Stafford. The building was purpose-built for the council and completed in 1978. Full council meetings are held at County Buildings on Martin Street. Prior to the completion of the Civic Centre in 1978 the council had its main offices at Borough Hall and met at the Guildhall in Market Square, which had been built in 1935 on the site of an earlier guildhall. Borough Hall was subsequently converted into an events venue and the Guildhall was converted into a shopping centre, being largely rebuilt behind the 1935 frontage.

== Towns and parishes ==
The main part of the Stafford urban area, roughly corresponding to the pre-1974 borough, is an unparished area. Nearly half the modern borough's population lives in this area. The rest of the borough is divided into civil parishes. The parish council for Stone has declared that parish to be a town, allowing it to take the style town council. Eccleshall is also commonly described as a town, having held a market charter from at least 1154, but its parish council has not formally declared it to be a town, nor is it a post town. The small parishes of Ellenhall and Marston have a parish meeting rather than a parish council.

The parishes are:

- Adbaston
- Barlaston
- Berkswich
- Bradley
- Brocton
- Chebsey
- Church Eaton
- Colwich
- Creswell
- Doxey
- Eccleshall
- Ellenhall
- Forton
- Fradswell (Note: shares grouped parish council with Milwich)
- Fulford
- Gayton (Note: shares grouped parish council with Weston)
- Gnosall
- Haughton
- High Offley
- Hilderstone
- Hixon
- Hopton and Coton
- Hyde Lea
- Ingestre (Note: shares grouped parish council with Tixall)
- Milwich (Note: shares grouped parish council with Fradswell)
- Norbury
- Ranton
- Salt and Enson
- Sandon and Burston
- Seighford
- Standon
- Stone
- Stone Rural
- Stowe-by-Chartley
- Swynnerton
- Tixall (Note: shares grouped parish council with Ingestre)
- Weston (Note: shares grouped parish council with Gayton)
- Whitgreave
- Yarnfield and Cold Meece.
