= Fradswell =

Village in Staffordshire, England

Coordinates: 52.8779°N 2.0165°W

- Location within Staffordshire
- Population: 194 (2011)
- OS grid reference: SJ 9918
- Shire county: Staffordshire
- Region: West Midlands
- Country: England
- Sovereign state: United Kingdom
- Post town: Stafford
- Postcode district: ST18
- Police: Staffordshire
- Fire: Staffordshire
- Ambulance: West Midlands

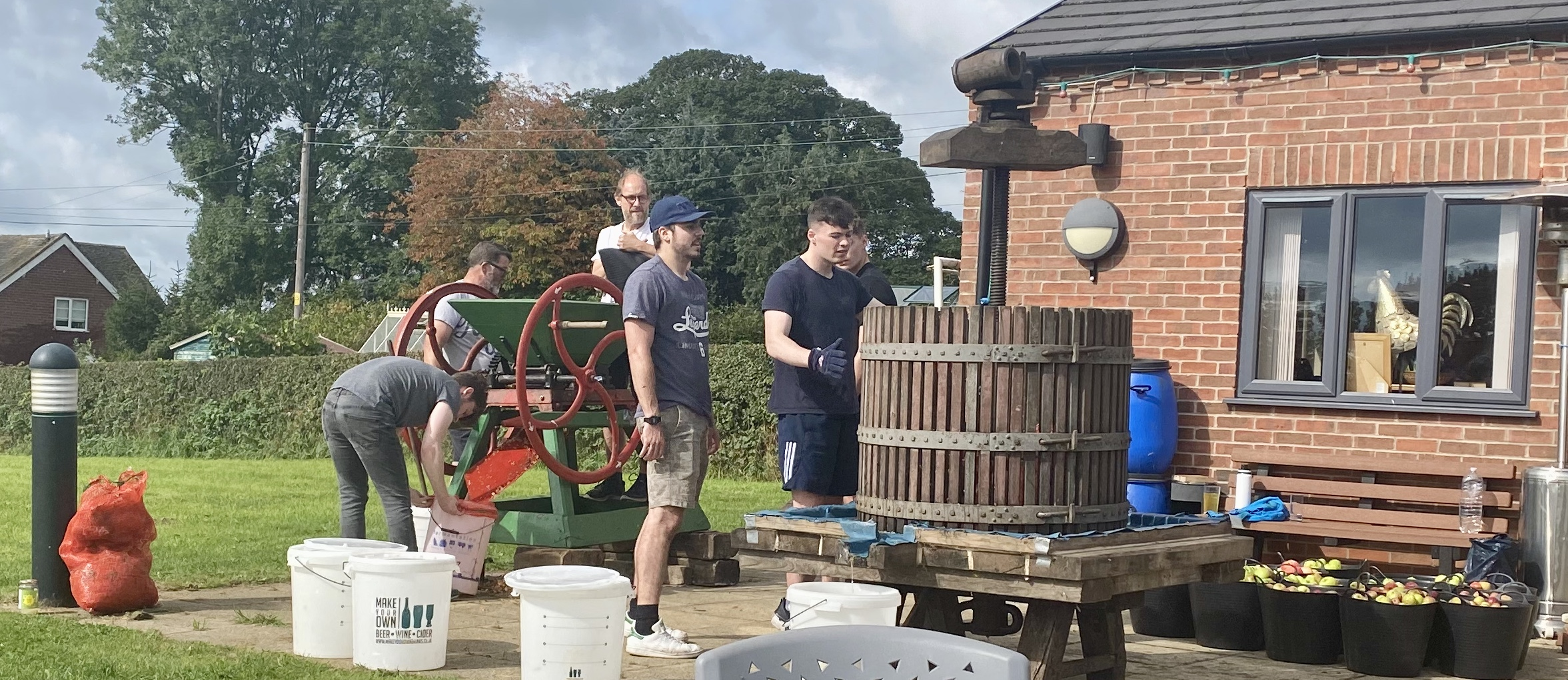
Fradswell Frapfest 2021. 900 litres of apple juice from local apples to be turned into cider in the autumn

Fradswell is a village in Staffordshire, England, approximately 7 miles (10 km) north-east of the town of Stafford and 7 miles (11 km) north of Colwich. Fradwell was first mentioned as part of the Colwich parish in the Domesday Book, where it is listed as Frodawelle or Frodeswelle, and it is likely to have been an Anglian settlement established during the Dark Ages.

The village received a church of its own in the 13th century, when the Chapel of Saint James The Less was established. The chancel survives, but the main part of the church was rebuilt in 1764. Fradswell became a parish in its own right in February 1851 (it has since become the Milwich with Fradswell Parish), and further refurbishment, including the building of a new nave and the installation of stained glass by William Wailes, followed soon after. At this time it had 237 inhabitants and 1,100 acres (4.5 km^{2}) of land.

Fradswell in 2021 is a rural village of 175 people. In 2015, it was awarded a Big Lottery grant of £450,000 to demolish the 1924 wooden village hall and build a new fit-for-purpose community hub, opened by local children in 2016. Nearby in the village green is a serenity garden. The hub runs regular monthly community events throughout the year.

Fradswell hosts two annual events. Each September, at Frapfest! the Fradswell Apple festival, locals donate apples to be chopped and pressed into apple juice, most of which is turned into Fradswell Cider over the autumn. In January, the Fradswell Wassail is an evening event with flaming torches, percussion and melodies by which the community "wake" the apple trees in expectation of a good summer crop.

== See also ==
- Listed buildings in Fradswell
