= Salt, Staffordshire =

Village in Staffordshire, England

Coordinates: 52°50′52″N 02°04′00″W

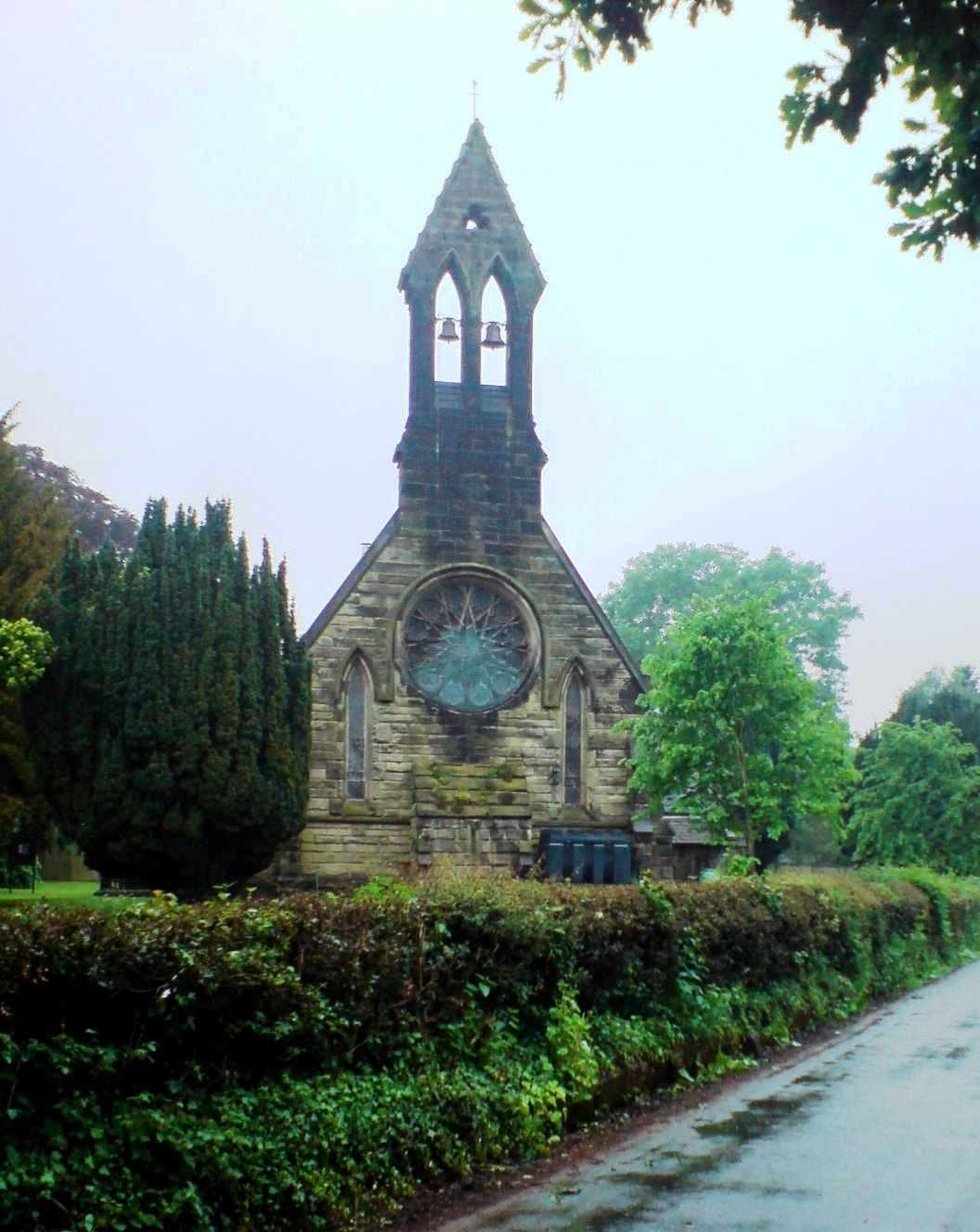
Church of St James the Great, Salt, May 2008

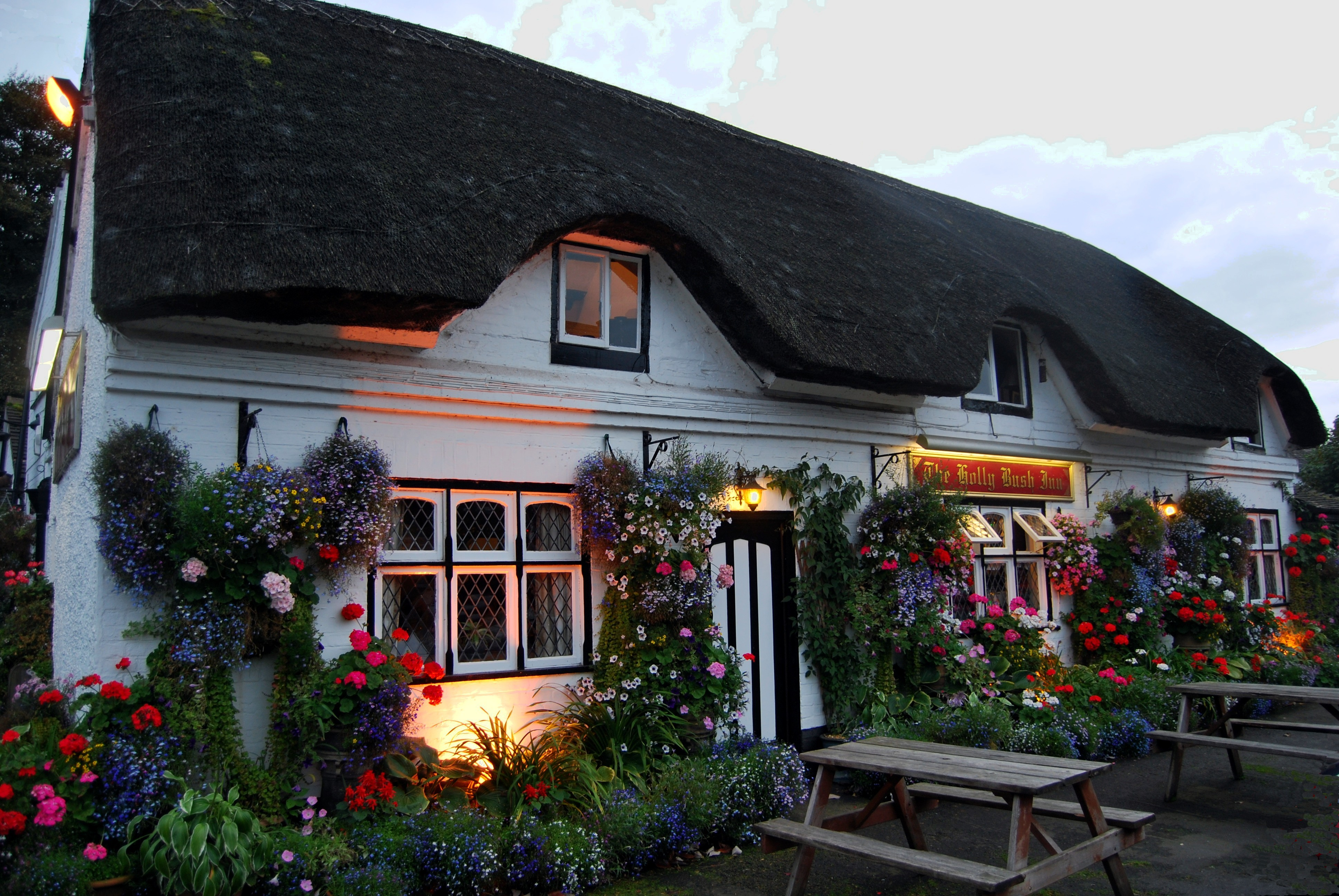
Holly Bush Inn Salt Stafford

Salt is a village in the Borough of Stafford in Staffordshire, England. It is in the civil parish of Salt and Enson, along with the hamlet of Enson. It is three miles northeast of Stafford situated half a mile southwest of the A51 trunk road and lying on elevated ground above the western side of the Trent valley. Bus service 841 links the village to Stafford and Uttoxeter. Population details as taken under the 2011 census are found under Seighford. The village has an ancient public house with a thatched roof, The Hollybush Inn, dating from the 17th century, reputedly much older, and a village hall.

The village is named because of the historical mining for salt and alabaster in the area. The village church is dedicated to St James the Great and was built on land donated by the Earl of Shrewsbury and largely paid for by him. It is grade II listed. It has a large circular stained glass east window, an unusually tall south porch and an open stone bell turret mounted at the east end of the church hung with two bells. The impressive wood rood screen was designed by Augustus Pugin. The village lies less than a mile to the north of Hopton Heath, which was a significant battlefield (Battle of Hopton Heath) in the English Civil War where in 1643 Parliamentarian forces were defeated by Royalists under Spencer Compton, who died there.

There is a parish council, the lowest tier of local government in England.

== See also ==
- Listed buildings in Salt and Enson
