= Creswell, Staffordshire =

Village and civil parish in Staffordshire, England

Coordinates: 52.8291°N 2.1501°W

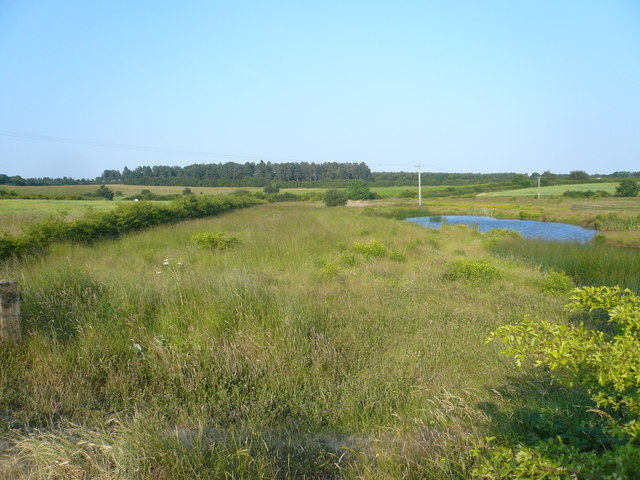
A view of the famous Creswell pond

Creswell is a small village on the north-western edge of Stafford, the county town of Staffordshire, England situated on elevated ground above the wide floodplain and extensive marshes of the River Sow. Population details taken at the 2011 census can be found under Seighford.

The village, just to the west of the M6 motorway (junction 14), has a population of a few hundred. The parish boundary also incorporates the Primepoint business park on the other side of the motorway. The village lies close to Doxey Marshes.

The name Creswell is thought to come from Old English Cærsewella referring to the plant watercress (cærse in Old English and wella meaning spring or stream), meaning 'the spring where watercress grows.' A Neolithic polished stone axehead was found in a garden in Creswell in 1960, and about a quarter of a mile to the north-west are the ruins of an ancient chapel, or meeting house.

== Creswell Chapel ==
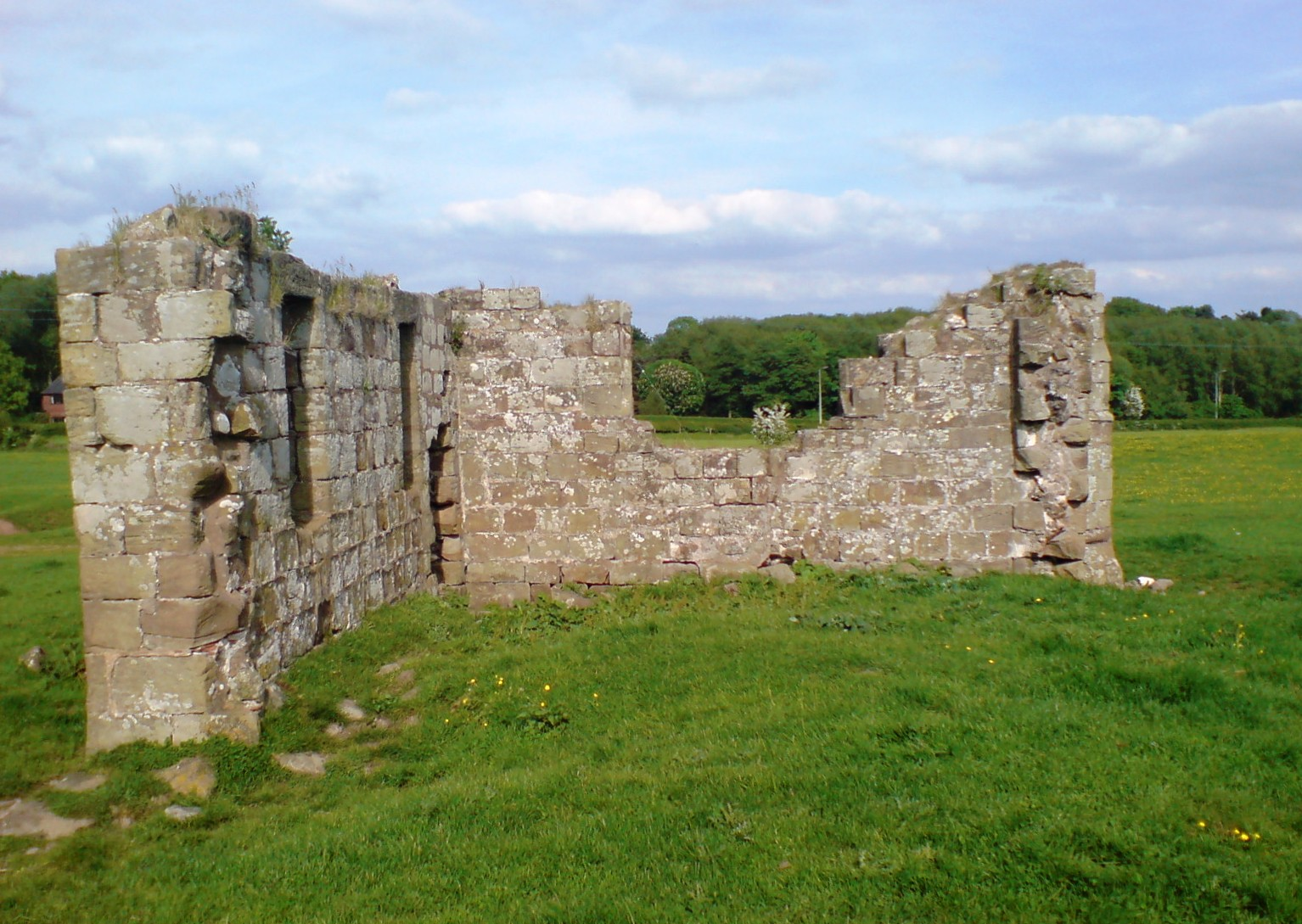
Chapel ruins, 2008

Most of the recorded history of the village centres on Creswell Chapel of Ease. The chapel is a partial ruin standing in fields to the northwest of the village proper. It had been in former times a subsidiary chapel of the Royal Free Chapel of St. Mary in Stafford since 1346. Only the two adjoining north and east walls of the chancel survive, the north window having Early English narrow lancet windows which are typical of the 13th century, while the east wall displays features typical of the 15th century.

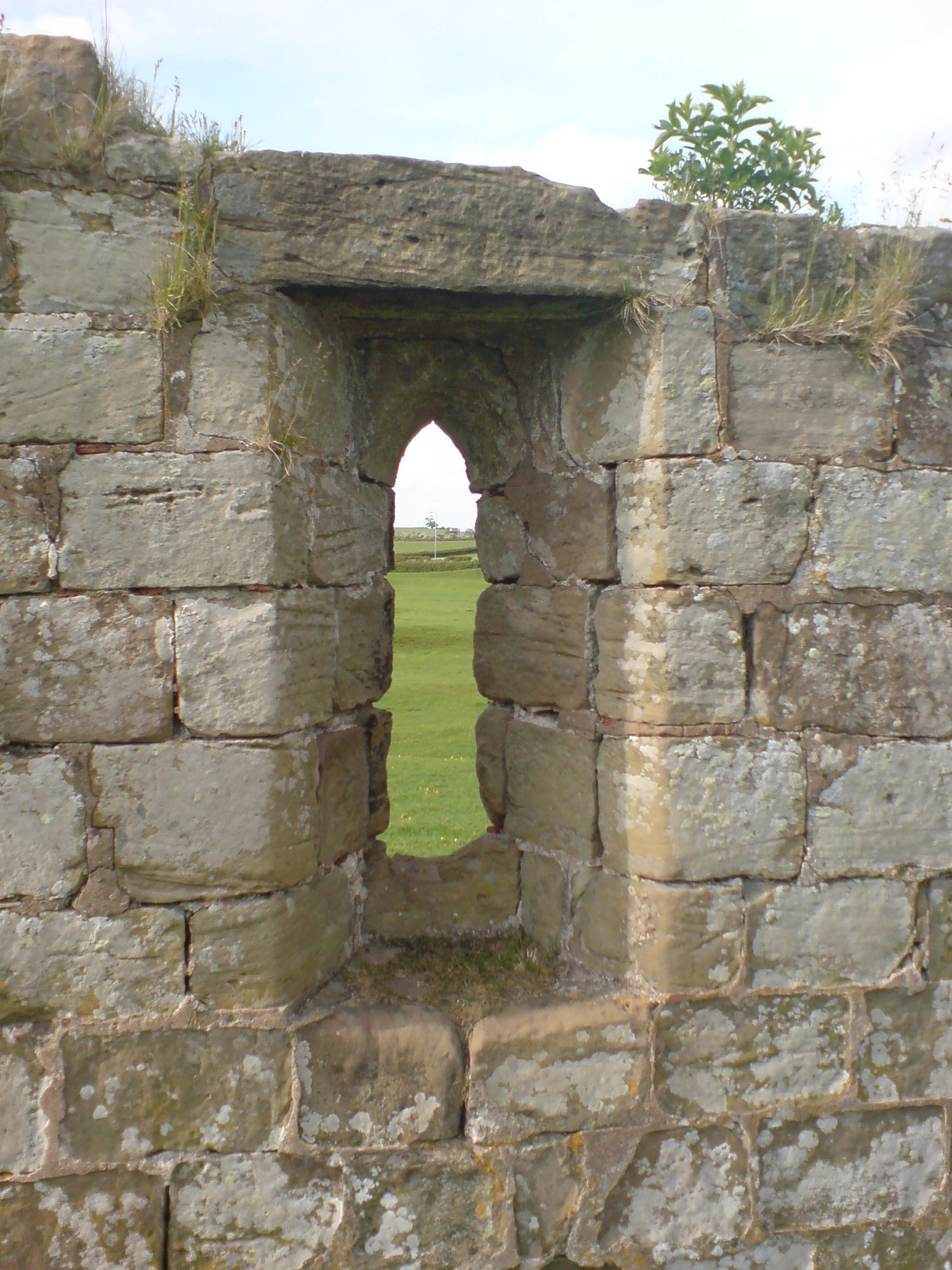
Lancet window of chapel ruins, May 2008

A 1428 inquisition stated that the parishioners of Creswell buried their dead in the graveyard of the Church of Saint Bertelin in Stafford, since no burials are recorded at Creswell Chapel.

== Wartime air crash ==
On 4 July 1944 a United States Army Air Forces P-51 Mustang aircraft crashed into a Creswell Home Farm wheatfield, killing the pilot, Captain John Pershing Perrin.

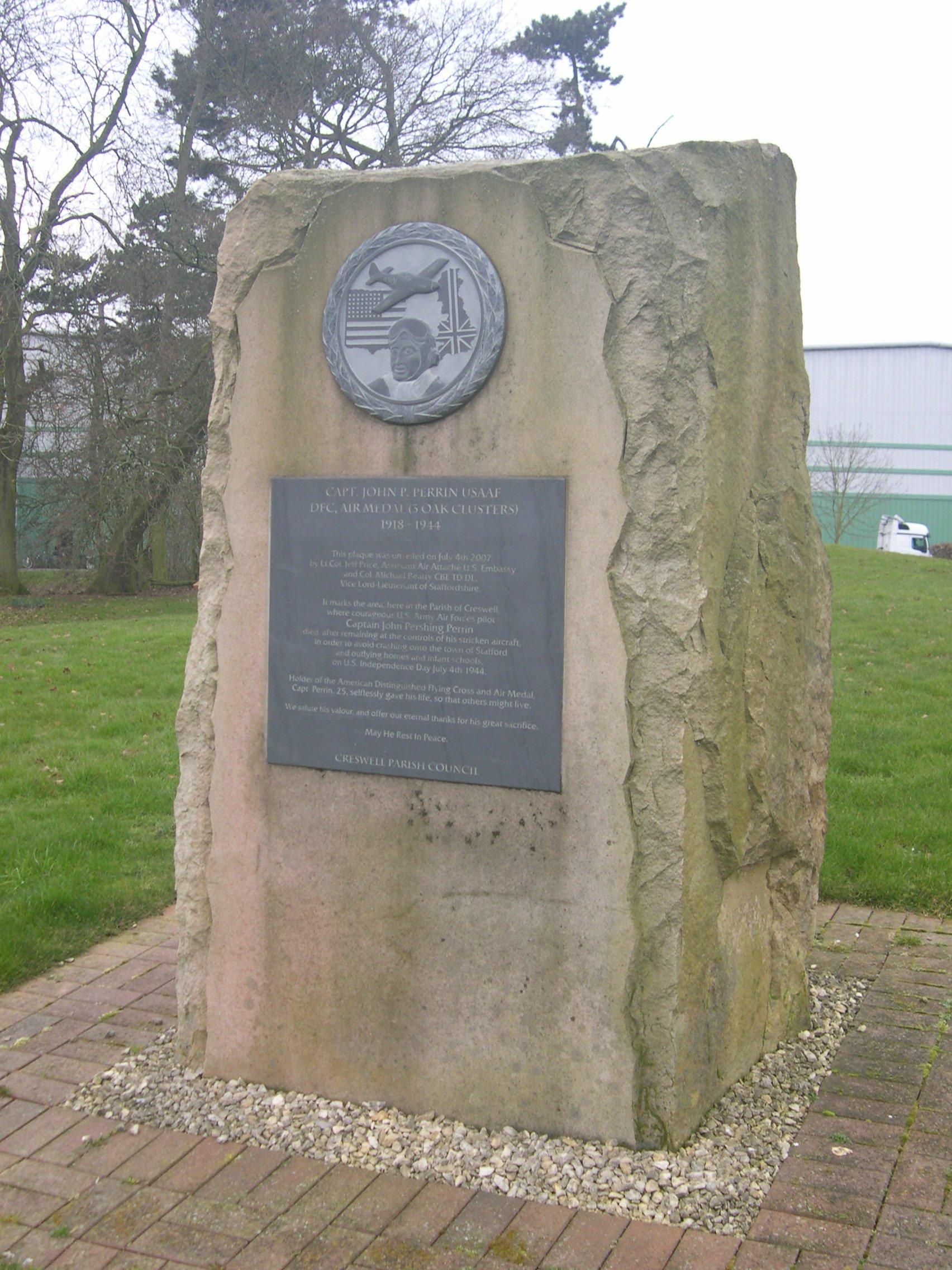
The Perrin Memorial

On 4 July 2007, the 63rd anniversary of Perrin's death, a monolithic stone memorial was erected at the crash site to commemorate him. A joint Anglo-American dedication service was held that day with representatives of the Perrin family, the U.S. Air Force, the American Embassy, and local officials attending.

== See also ==
- Listed buildings in Creswell, Staffordshire
