= Whitgreave =

Village in Staffordshire, England

Coordinates: 52.85111°N 2.14979°W

- Location within Staffordshire
- Population: 209 (2011)
- OS grid reference: SJ9001028190
- District: Stafford
- Shire county: Staffordshire
- Region: West Midlands
- Country: England
- Sovereign state: United Kingdom
- Post town: Stafford
- Postcode district: ST18
- Police: Staffordshire
- Fire: Staffordshire
- Ambulance: West Midlands
- UK Parliament: Stafford

Whitgreave is a very small village a few miles to the NNW of Stafford situated midway between the M6 motorway to the west and the A34 trunk road to the east.

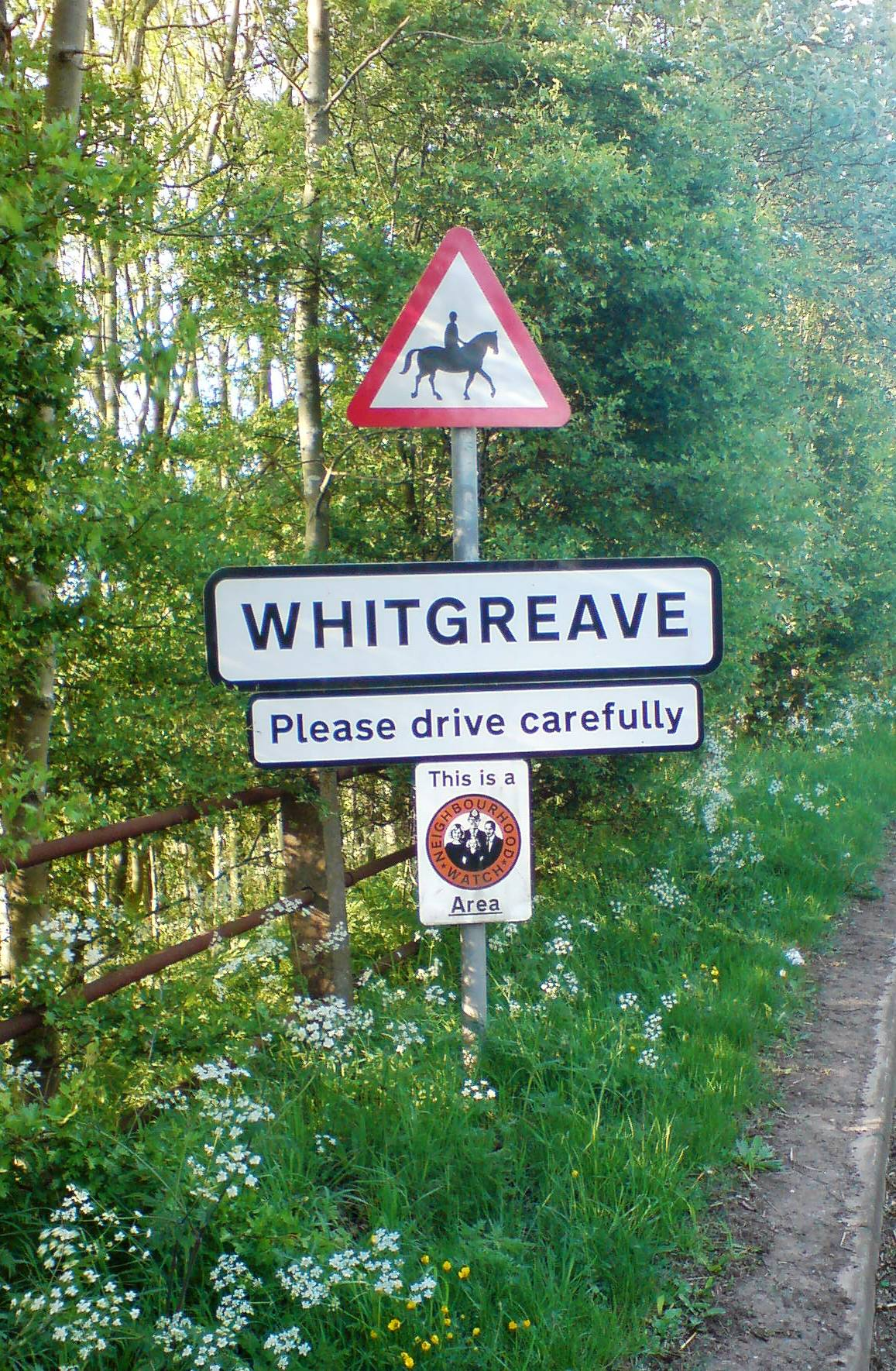
Whitgreave village sign, May 2008

It lies about 1.5 miles (2.4 km) to the northeast of Great Bridgeford. The small village church of St John the Evangelist is of red-brick construction and was built in 1844, and is now a chapel of ease holding occasional services.

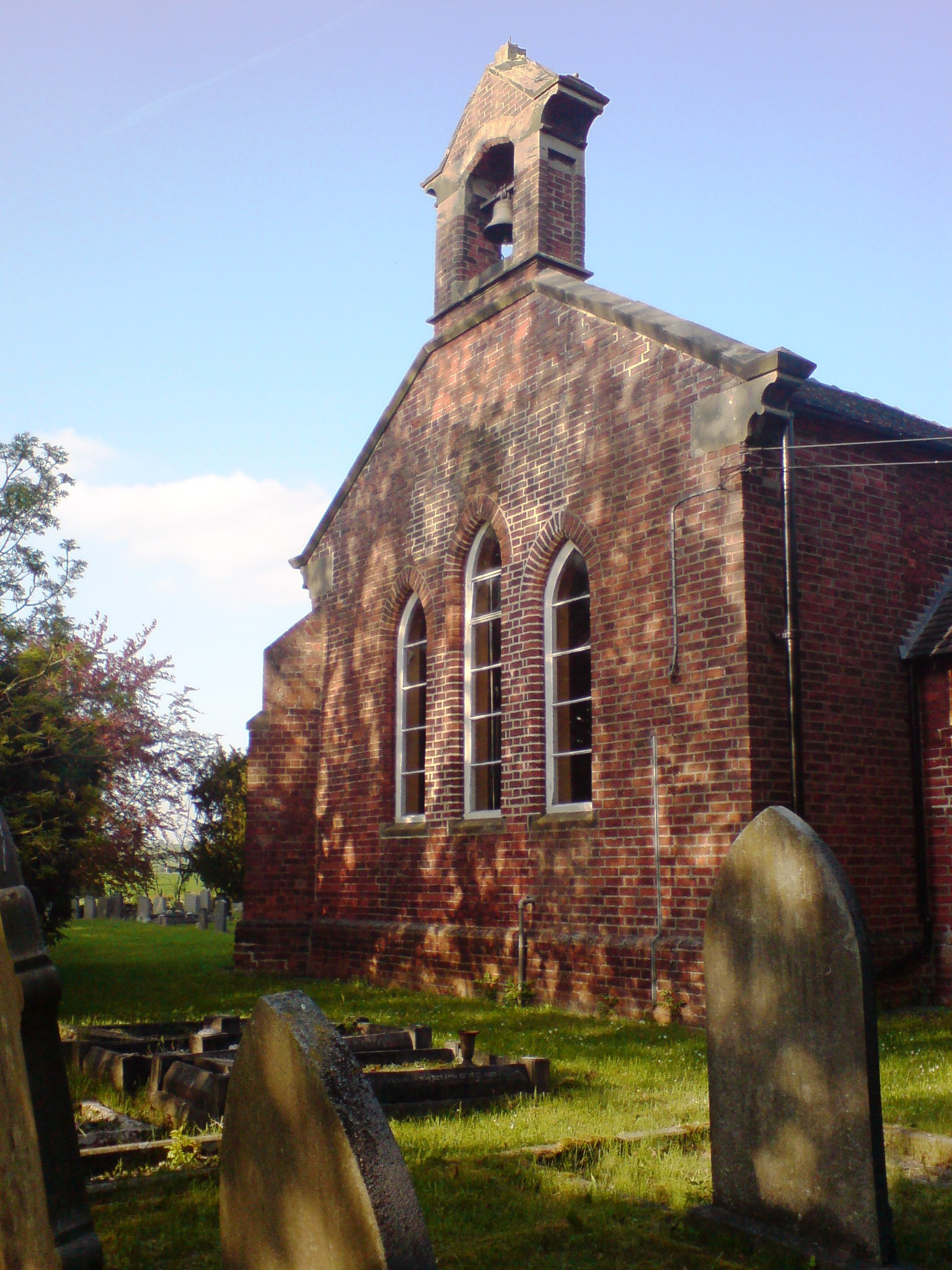
Whitgreave church, May 2008

== History ==
=== 1851 ===
William White wrote in 1851 that "Whitgreave or Whitgrove, is a township of 1,620 acres (6.6 km^{2}) and 185 souls. It includes several scattered houses, and a small village, lying in a pleasant valley, four miles (6 km) NNW of Stafford, and is chiefly owned by HC Taylor, Esq".

=== 1894–1895 ===
It was written in The Comprehensive Gazetteer of England and Wales 1894–1895 that "Whitgreave is 1 mile NE of Great Bridgeford station and 3.5 miles NNW of Stafford. The population is 160 and the total area of the village is 1,201 acres (4.86 km^{2}). The ecclesiastical parish was constituted in 1844".

=== 1887 ===
It was written in The Gazetteer of the British Isles, 1887 that "Whitgreave is a township in the parishes of St. Mary and Chad, and is 3 miles NW of Stafford. It is made up of 1201 acres and has a population of 150"

=== 1986 ===
Whitgreave was also written about in 1986 in the BBC Domesday Project. Visitors to Whitgreave reported that "the total population is about 75, a third of them being children, and half the population has moved to the village in the last five years". As well as that "there is a lack of public transport, as well as lack of corner shop, pub, school or any club building". Visitors also observe that "church going is not popular and there is no resident vicar, also that there are three farms in the village". Also described are the range of recreational activities such as gardening, fishing and aerobics, which are on offer in the village.

== Population ==
=== 1851 Census – 1961 Census ===
Data from the 1851 census shows that the population in 1851 was 191, decreasing by approximately 10 in the 1861 census, and decreasing again by around 30 to 150 people in 1881. The population then increases slightly to 161 in 1891, with 78 males and 83 females. The 1901 census shows the population is 140, which then decreases slightly to 132 in the 1911 census, with 71 males and 61 females. The population then increases to 168 in the 1921 census. In 1931 the population was 226, decreasing to 197 in 1951 and decreasing further to 156 in 1961.

Population of Whitgreave 1851–1921

=== 2001 Census ===
The 2001 census recorded that there were 188 people living in the village of Whitgreave on Sunday, 29 April 2001, with 90 males and 98 females.

== Housing ==
=== 1881 – 1961 ===
The 1881 census recorded that there were 32 households in Whitgreave. In 1891 and 1901 this decreased slightly to 30 households. In 1921 this then increases to 34, and increases again to 48 in 1931 and then to 58 in 1951. In 1961 the number of households decreases to 53.

=== 2001 ===
In the 2001 census it is recorded that there were 77 dwellings. There were 52 detached houses, 19 semi-detached and 6 flats, caravans or temporary structures. The average people living in a household was 2.69 people, with the average number of rooms per household being 6.34. There were 37 owner-occupied houses, with 16 houses rented from the local council and 17 rented from a private landlord or letting agency.

== Industry ==
=== 1881 ===
The 1881 census records of occupations recorded that the majority of males were employed in agriculture, with 31 recorded to be in this occupation. The rest of the male population's occupations were in domestic services, with animals, in food and lodging and other occupations. It also records that only 10 females had a job, which was in domestic services, whilst 31 females had "no specified occupation".

=== 2001 ===
The 2001 census record of work and qualifications recorded that 103 people were economically active, whilst 32 people were economically inactive. The majority of people in Whitgreave were employed in the service sector, with a large number also having no qualifications or in managerial professions.
