= Shebdon =

Hamlet in Staffordshire, England

Coordinates: 52.83°N 2.358°W

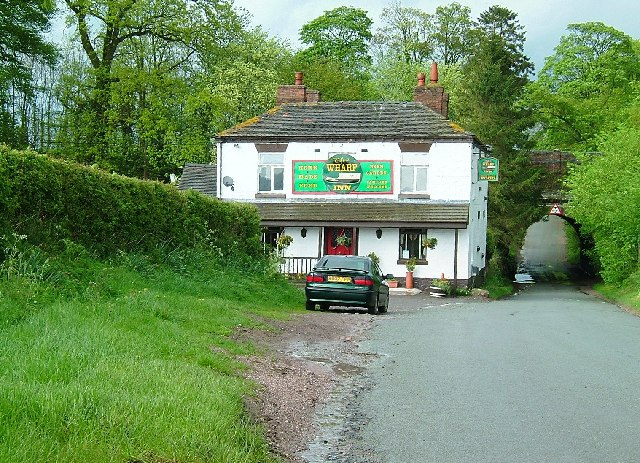
The Wharf Inn; the Shebdon aqueduct can be seen to the right

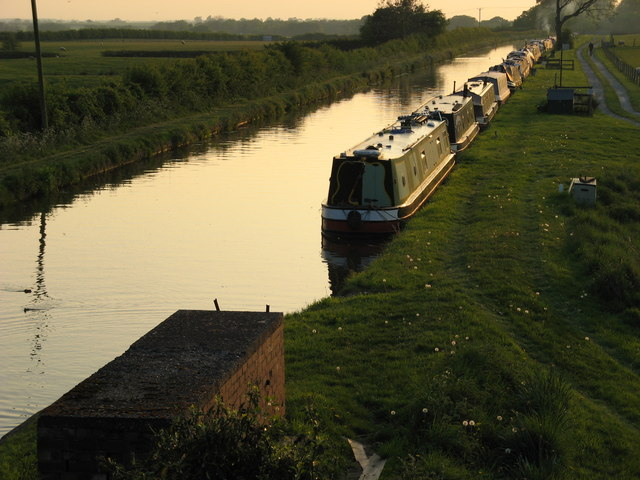
The Shropshire Union Canal at Shebdon

Shebdon is a hamlet in the county of Staffordshire, England. It is part of the parish of High Offley, a small village approximately 1.5 miles to the ENE. To the northwest is the hamlet of Knighton, to the north the small village of Adbaston and to the south the hamlet of Weston Jones.

The Shropshire Union Canal passes through the hamlet, which gives its name to a number of features on this section of the canal, from west to east: the Shebdon aqueduct (between Knighton and Shebdon), the Wharf Inn (Shebdon) winding hole, the Shebdon embankment (through Shebdon), Shebdon bridge (number 44) and the lengthy Shebdon wharf. The public house situated by the canal near the aqueduct called the Wharf Inn closed in 2013.
