= Loynton Moss =

Nature reserve in Staffordshire, England

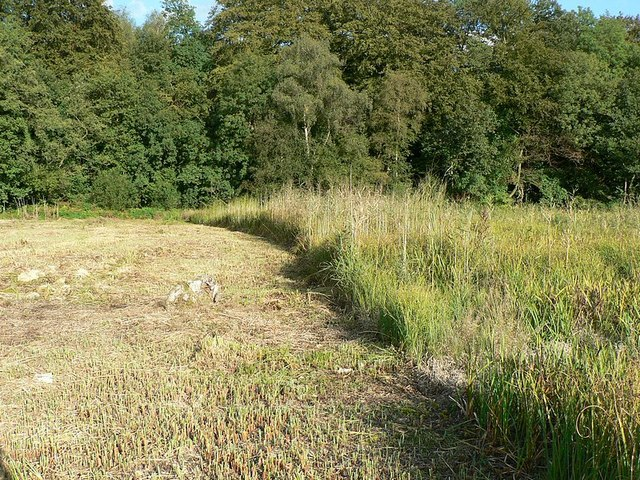
- Reed bed (formerly Blakemerly Pool) in Loynton Moss

- Location within Staffordshire
- Location: near Woodseaves, Staffordshire
- OS grid: SJ 788 246
- Coordinates: 52.819°N 2.314°W
- Area: 13 hectares (32 acres)
- Operator: Staffordshire Wildlife Trust
- Designation: Site of Special Scientific Interest
- Website: www.staffs-wildlife.org.uk/nature-reserves/loynton-moss

Loynton Moss is a nature reserve of the Staffordshire Wildlife Trust, near the village of Woodseaves, in Staffordshire, England. It is adjacent to the Shropshire Union Canal, as it runs from nearby Norbury to High Offley.

== Description ==
The area of the reserve is 13 hectares (32 acres), and it is designated a Site of Special Scientific Interest. There are walking trails, except in the mostly inaccessible areas of reedbed and wet woodland. There are mosquitoes in the wetter areas during the summer, which may deter visitors.

=== Geology ===
The particular landscape is a result of a process after the last ice age. A kettle hole was formed by dead ice left by retreating glaciers, which became a lake when the ice finally melted. The former lake is now an area of peaty, boggy land, known as a Moss.

=== Environments ===
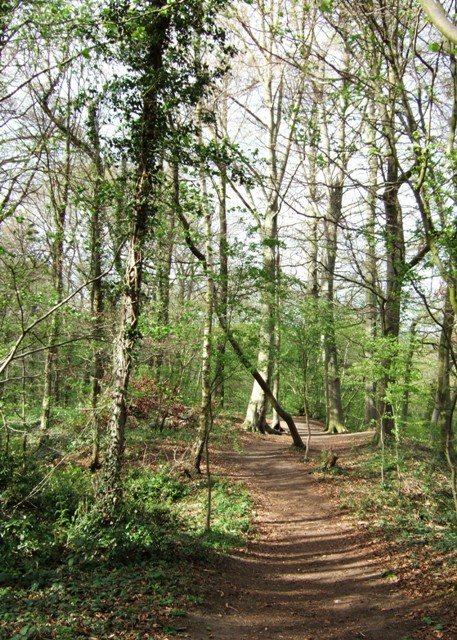
Woodland in Loynton Moss

There are dry wooded areas, where bluebells can be seen in the spring.

Grassland, acquired by the Trust in 2000, is a large part of the reserve. It is former wetland, drained for agriculture in 1970.

There are areas of reedbed, and wet woodland including an alder carr. Uncommon plants found here include marsh cinquefoil and cowbane. Moths, butterflies and many species of rare insects can be found in the wetland. Birds such as willow warbler and reed bunting are attracted by the particular insects in this habitat.

Birch trees consume much water during the summer and can affect ground water levels of the wetland, so some have been felled in places. Ditches and land drains are monitored.
