= Loynton =

Hamlet in Staffordshire, England

Coordinates: 52.815°N 2.313°W

- Location within Staffordshire
- Civil parish: Norbury
- District: Stafford
- Shire county: Staffordshire
- Region: West Midlands
- Country: England
- Sovereign state: United Kingdom
- Post town: Stafford
- Postcode district: ST20
- Police: Staffordshire
- Fire: Staffordshire
- Ambulance: West Midlands
- UK Parliament: Stone

Loynton is a hamlet on the A519 near the villages of Norbury, and Woodseaves in Staffordshire, England. It lies in the civil parish of Norbury.

The settlement is mentioned in the Domesday Book, though Loynton Hall is believed to have been built around 1671 by the Higgins Burne family. Whilst there are very few houses and farms, the main feature of the hamlet is a nature reserve, Loynton Moss, which also has an SSSI status. Through the nature reserve runs the Shropshire Union Canal.

There is a road bridge over the canal, carrying the A519, under which is reportedly the smallest telegraph pole with the most wires anywhere.
