= Tunstall, Stafford =

Hamlet in Stafford, England

Coordinates: 52.844°N 2.340°W

Tunstall
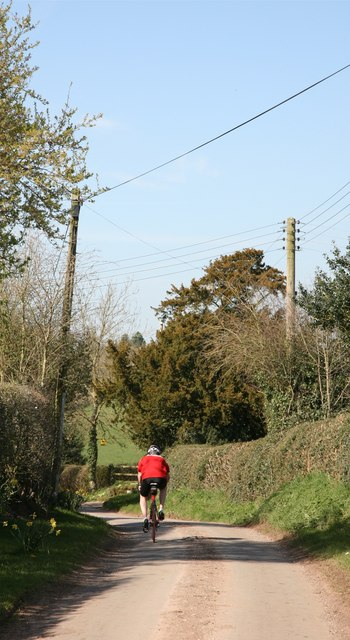

- Location within Staffordshire
- OS grid reference: SJ7727
- Civil parish: Adbaston
- District: Stafford
- Shire county: Staffordshire
- Region: West Midlands
- Country: England
- Sovereign state: United Kingdom

Tunstall is a hamlet near Eccleshall in the borough of Stafford in Staffordshire, England. In 1870–72 it had a population of 72. Tunstall was recorded in the Domesday Book as Tunestal.

== See also ==
- Listed buildings in Adbaston
