= High Onn =

Hamlet in Staffordshire, England

Coordinates: 52.7432°N 2.2578°W

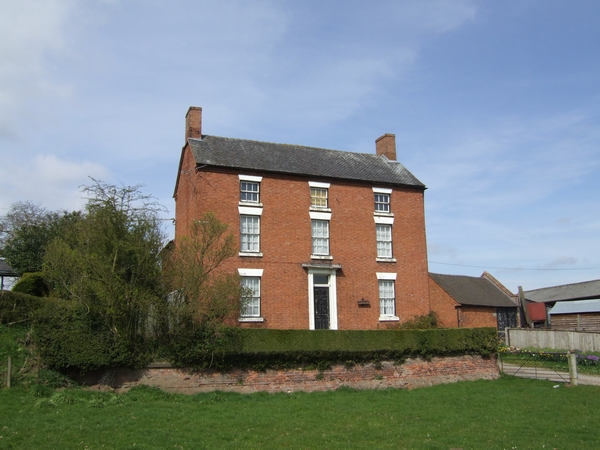
- High Onn House

- Location within Staffordshire
- Civil parish: Church Eaton
- District: Stafford
- Shire county: Staffordshire
- Region: West Midlands
- Country: England
- Sovereign state: United Kingdom
- Police: Staffordshire
- Fire: Staffordshire
- Ambulance: West Midlands

High Onn is a hamlet in the civil parish of Church Eaton, in the Stafford district, in the county of Staffordshire, England, near Wheaton Aston.

== See also ==
- Listed buildings in Church Eaton
