= Wood Eaton =

Wood Eaton may refer to:

- Woodeaton, Oxfordshire, England (older spelling)
- Wood Eaton, Staffordshire, England
