= Listed buildings in Church Eaton =

Church Eaton is a civil parish in the Borough of Stafford, Staffordshire, England. It contains 26 listed buildings that are recorded in the National Heritage List for England. Of these, one is at Grade II*, the middle of the three grades, and the others are at Grade II, the lowest grade. The parish contains the villages of Church Easton, High Onn, and Marston, and the surrounding countryside. The Shropshire Union Canal passes through the parish, and a high proportion of the listed buildings are associated with it, consisting of bridges and mileposts. The other listed buildings are a church, and houses, cottages and farmhouses with associated structures, many of which are timber framed, or have timber framed cores.

== Key ==
Grade	Criteria
II*	Particularly important buildings of more than special interest
II	Buildings of national importance and special interest

== Buildings ==
Name and location	Photograph	Date	Notes	Grade
St Editha's Church; 52.75603°N 2.22566°W		Late 12th to early century	The church was altered and extended in the following centuries, and was restored in 1886 by Charles Lynam. It is built in stone, and consists of a nave, a north aisle, a south porch, a chancel, a north vestry and chapel, and a west steeple. The steeple has a tower with clasping buttresses, a clock face, and a recessed spire. In the tower are two small Norman windows, and the east window is very large.	II*
Smithy Cottage; 52.75470°N 2.22980°W	—	Medieval (probable)	The cottage has a timber framed core with cruck construction, it has been partly refaced in brick, and has a tile roof. There is one storey and an attic, and two bays. In the centre is a doorway, the windows are casement windows, and there are two gabled dormers. In the left gable end are exposed cruck trusses.	II
Cottage formerly occupied by W E Jackson, Marston; 52.72323°N 2.24601°W	—	Early 17th century	A timber framed cottage with brick infill and a tile roof. There is one storey and an attic, and two bays, and the windows are casements.	II
The Briars; 52.75501°N 2.22938°W		Early 17th century (probable)	The cottage is timber framed with colourwashed brick infill and a thatched roof. There is one storey and an attic, and two bays. The windows are casements with leaded lights, two ground floor windows project on carved brackets, and the roof sweeps over the upper windows.	II
Elm Tree Farmhouse, Marston; 52.72500°N 2.24356°W	—	17th century	The farmhouse has a timber framed core, later mainly refaced in brick, and a tile roof. There are two storeys, two bays, and a later single-bay extension to the right. The windows are casements, and there is exposed timber framing on the north gable end.	II
Institute Farmhouse; 52.75575°N 2.22637°W		17th century	The farmhouse is timber framed with brick infill and has a thatched roof. There is one storey and an attic, and two bays. The windows are casements.	II
The Dolphin House; 52.75494°N 2.22910°W	—	17th century (probable)	The house is timber framed with brick infill and has a tile roof with its gable end facing the street. There are two storeys, the windows are casements, and there is a later bay window on the front.	II
The Old Rectory; 52.75510°N 2.22460°W	—	1712	The house is in brick with a modillion eaves cornice, and a tile roof with parapeted end gables. There are two storeys and five bays. The doorway has a segmental head, pilasters, and a blind fanlight with a twin arch motif. The windows are sashes with projecting keyblocks and segmental heads.	II
Hall Farm House; 52.75898°N 2.23912°W		18th century	A brick house with a modillion eaves cornice and a hipped tile roof. There are two storeys and an attic, and three bays, the middle bay projecting under an embattled parapet. The windows are casements, there are two gabled dormers, and at the top of the middle bay is a triangular window.	II
Shushions Manor; 52.72658°N 2.23458°W	—	18th century	A brick house with a hipped tile roof, two storeys and an attic, and three bays. On the south side is a canted porch and a doorway with a fanlight and a pediment, and the windows are sashes.	II
Wall and Gate Piers, The Old Rectory; 52.75487°N 2.22457°W	—	18th century	The wall surrounds three sides of the front garden, and is in brick with stone coping. The gate piers are square, and in brick with ball finials.	II
High Onn House; 52.74402°N 2.25673°W	—	Early 19th century	A brick house with modillion eaves and a tile roof. There are three storeys and three bays. The central doorway has pilasters, a rectangular fanlight and an entablature, and the windows are sashes with plain lintels.	II
Bridge No. 21 (Shushions Bridge); 52.73025°N 2.22710°W	—	c. 1830–33	An accommodation bridge over the Shropshire Union Canal designed by Thomas Telford. It is in brick and consists of a single elliptical arch. The bridge has a slightly cambered solid parapet, a stone band and copings, and piers.	II
Bridge No. 23 (Ryehill Cutting Bridge); 52.73794°N 2.23011°W		c. 1830–33	An accommodation bridge over the Shropshire Union Canal designed by Thomas Telford. It is in brick and consists of a single elliptical arch. The bridge has a solid parapet, a stone band and copings, and piers.	II
Bridge No. 24 (Little Onn Bridge); 52.74262°N 2.23529°W		c. 1830–33	The bridge, which carries Chatwell Lane over the Shropshire Union Canal, was designed by Thomas Telford. It is in brick and consists of a single elliptical arch. The bridge has a slightly cambered solid parapet, a stone band and brick and stone copings, and piers.	II
Bridge No. 25 (High Onn Bridge); 52.74901°N 2.24528°W		c. 1830–33	The bridge, which carries a road over the Shropshire Union Canal, was designed by Thomas Telford. It is in brick and consists of a single elliptical arch. The bridge has a slightly cambered solid parapet, a stone band and brick and stone copings, and piers.	II
Bridge No. 26 (Turnover Bridge); 52.75222°N 2.25003°W		c. 1830–33	The bridge, which carries Church Eaton Rand over the Shropshire Union Canal, was designed by Thomas Telford. It is a roving bridge in brick, and consists of a single elliptical skew arch. The bridge has a stone band and brick and stone copings. The south parapet continues as low curving wing walls, and the north parapet is slightly cambered, with piers.	II
Bridge No. 27 (Parks Bridge); 52.75362°N 2.25098°W	—	c. 1830–33	An accommodation bridge over the Shropshire Union Canal designed by Thomas Telford. It is in brick and consists of a single elliptical arch. The bridge has voussoirs, a stone band and copings, a slightly cambered solid parapet, and piers.	II
Bridge No. 28 (Parks Barn Bridge); 52.75734°N 2.25122°W	—	c. 1830–33	The bridge carries a bridleway over the Shropshire Union Canal, and was designed by Thomas Telford. It is in stone and consists of a single elliptical arch. The bridge has voussoirs and a slightly cambered solid parapet, a stone band and copings, and piers.	II
Bridge No. 29 (Wood Eaton Bridge); 52.76105°N 2.25167°W		c. 1830–33	The bridge carries Broad Lane over the Shropshire Union Canal, and was designed by Thomas Telford. It is in stone and consists of a single elliptical arch. The bridge has voussoirs, a solid parapet and piers, and the abutments are slightly curved.	II
Bridge No. 30 (Castle Cutting Bridge); 52.76394°N 2.25226°W		c. 1830–33	An accommodation bridge over the Shropshire Union Canal designed by Thomas Telford. It is in stone and consists of a single tall elliptical arch. The bridge has voussoirs, a solid parapet, and piers. The abutments are slightly curved.	II
Milepost 3.5 miles south of Norbury Junction; 52.76602°N 2.25271°W	—	c. 1835	The milepost is on the towpath of the Shropshire Union Canal. It is in cast iron, and consists of a short circular post with three panels giving the distances to Autherley Junction, Nantwich and Norbury Junction.	II
Milepost 4.5 miles south of Norbury Junction; 52.75182°N 2.24952°W	—	c. 1835	The milepost is on the towpath of the Shropshire Union Canal. It is in cast iron, and consists of a short circular post with three panels giving the distances to Autherley Junction, Nantwich and Norbury Junction.	II
Milepost 5.5 miles south of Norbury Junction; 52.74096°N 2.23257°W	—	c. 1835	The milepost is on the towpath of the Shropshire Union Canal. It is in cast iron, and consists of a short circular post with three panels giving the distances to Autherley Junction, Nantwich and Norbury Junction.	II
Milepost 6.5 miles south of Norbury Junction; 52.72715°N 2.22542°W	—	c. 1835	The milepost is on the towpath of the Shropshire Union Canal. It is in cast iron, and consists of a short circular post with three panels giving the distances to Autherley Junction, Nantwich and Norbury Junction.	II
Brookhouse Farmhouse; 52.75808°N 2.23563°W	—	1849	The farmhouse is in brick with a tile roof, two storeys and three bays. The doorway has flat pilasters and an entablature, and the windows are sashes with segmental heads.	II
