= Listed buildings in High Offley =

High Offley is a civil parish in the Borough of Stafford, Staffordshire, England. It contains twelve listed buildings that are recorded in the National Heritage List for England. Of these, one is listed at Grade I, the highest of the three grades, one is at Grade II*, the middle grade, and the others are at Grade II, the lowest grade. The parish contains the villages of High Offley and Woodseaves, and the surrounding countryside. The Shropshire Union Canal runs through the parish, and a high proportion of the listed buildings are associated with it, namely, bridges, mileposts, and an aqueduct. The other listed buildings include a church, two houses, the surviving portico of another house, a former toll house, and a milepost on a road.

== Key ==
Grade	Criteria
I	Buildings of exceptional interest, sometimes considered to be internationally important
II*	Particularly important buildings of more than special interest
II	Buildings of national importance and special interest

== Buildings ==
Name and location	Photograph	Date	Notes	Grade
St Mary's Church; 52.83254°N 2.32284°W		c. 1200	The church was altered and extended in the following centuries, and was restored in the 19th century. It is built in freestone and sandstone, and has tile roofs. The church consists of a nave, a south aisle, a southwest porch, a chancel, and a west tower. The tower has three stages, a round-headed west window, clock faces on the north and south sides, and an embattled parapet with pinnacles.	I
Portico at Batchacre; 52.82336°N 2.36877°W	—	1584	The portico is the only surviving part of a moated 16th-century house. It consists of two pairs of fluted Ionic columns carrying an entablature with a round-headed arch containing armorial shields. There is an internal round-headed arch with an ornament.	II
Batchacre Hall; 52.82586°N 2.36646°W		Early 18th century	A house in red brick with string courses, a modillion eaves cornice, a parapet, and a tile roof. There are three storeys and a cellar, and five bays, the middle bay projecting. The window are sashes with projecting keystones, and in the cellar are mullioned windows.	II*
Old Hall; 52.83090°N 2.31833°W	—	c. 1800	The house is built in brick with a slate roof, and is in late Georgian style. There are three storeys and three bays. On the front is a porch with Doric pillars, and the windows are modern casements.	II
Toll Lodge; 52.83975°N 2.35777°W	—	Early 19th century	The former toll house is in rendered sandstone with tile roof. It has an octagonal plan, and two storeys. Three faces each contain a window with a pointed arch, there is a doorway on the east side, and at the west is a later extension in brick.	II
Bridge No 41, (Grub Street Bridge); 52.82482°N 2.32452°W		c. 1829–32	The bridge, designed by Thomas Telford, carries Grub Street over the Shropshire Union Canal. It is in stone, and consists of a single elliptical arch. The bridge has a stone band and copings, a solid parapet and piers.	II
Bridge No 42, (Anchor Bridge); 52.82807°N 2.33509°W		c. 1829–32	The bridge, designed by Thomas Telford, carries Peggs Lane over the Shropshire Union Canal. It is in stone, and consists of a single elliptical skew arch. The bridge has a stone band and copings, a solid parapet and piers.	II
Bridge No 43, (Bullock's Bridge); 52.83056°N 2.33933°W		c. 1829–32	Designed by Thomas Telford, this is an accommodation bridge carrying a bridleway over the Shropshire Union Canal. It is in stone, and consists of a single elliptical arch. The bridge has a stone band and copings, a slightly cambered solid parapet and piers.	II
Shebdon Aqueduct; 52.83208°N 2.36041°W	—	c. 1829–32	The aqueduct carries the Shropshire Union Canal over Main Road. It was designed by Thomas Telford, and is in stone. Both portals are similar, and have semicircular arches with voussoirs, stone coping, impost bands, and right-angled wing walls. Inside the tunnel is banded rustication.	II
Milepost 2.5 miles north of Norbury Junction; 52.82949°N 2.33734°W		c. 1835	The milepost is on the towpath of the Shropshire Union Canal. It is in cast iron and carries three plates with the distances to Autherley Junction, Nantwich, and Norbury Junction.	II
Milepost 3.5 miles north of Norbury Junction; 52.83201°N 2.36014°W		c. 1835	The milepost is on the towpath of the Shropshire Union Canal. It is in cast iron and carries three plates with the distances to Autherley Junction, Nantwich, and Norbury Junction.	II
Milepost 9 miles from Stafford; 52.82493°N 2.29957°W	—	Mid 19th century	The milepost is at the junction of B5405 and the A519 roads. It is in cast iron, inscribed "Parish of High Offley" and indicates the distances from Stafford, Newport and London.	II
