= Listed buildings in Adbaston =

Adbaston is a civil parish in the Borough of Stafford, Staffordshire, England. It contains 15 listed buildings that are recorded in the National Heritage List for England. Of these, one is at Grade II*, the middle of the three grades, and the others are at Grade II, the lowest grade. The parish includes the villages of Adbaston, Knighton, and Tunstall, and the surrounding countryside. The Shropshire Union Canal passes through the parish, and the listed buildings associated with it are three bridges and a milepost. The other listed buildings include a church, a churchyard cross, houses and associated structures, cottages, farmhouses and farm buildings.

== Key ==
Grade	Criteria
II*	Particularly important buildings of more than special interest
II	Buildings of national importance and special interest

== Buildings ==
Name and location	Photograph	Date	Notes	Grade
Church of St Michael and All Angels; 52.84825°N 2.35449°W		12th century	The church was altered and extended during the following centuries, it was restored in 1885, and the porch was added in 1894. The church is built in local red sandstone with tile roofs. It consists of a nave, a north aisle, a south porch, a lower chancel, and a west tower. The tower is in Perpendicular style, and has three stages, angle buttresses, a blocked west doorway, a three-light west window, a clock face on the south side, a quatrefoil band, and an embattled parapet with eight crocketed pinnacles. There are two Norman windows in the chancel.	II*
Churchyard Cross; 52.84811°N 2.35438°W	—	15th century	The cross is in the churchyard of the Church of St Michael and All Angels. It is in stone, and consists of a square base with chamfered angles on four octagonal steps. The shaft and head are modern.	II
Palins Farmhouse; 52.84089°N 2.37517°W	—	17th century	The farmhouse, which was later extended, is partly timber framed and partly in brick, and has a thatched roof. There are two storeys, four bays, and an extension on the left with a tiled roof. The windows are casements.	II
Outbuildings, Wood Farm; 52.85985°N 2.36133°W	—	17th century (probable)	The farm buildings are in stone with tile roofs, they have one storey, and form two ranges at right angles. The west range has an open front with supports in brick and wood, and the cross-wing is a cart shed with monolithic stone columns.	II
Knighton Grange; 52.84416°N 2.37886°W	—	Late 17th century (probable)	A brick house with a string course and a tile roof with coped gables. There are two storeys and an attic, and five bays. On the front is a two-storey porch that has a round-headed doorway with a projecting keystone and a stepped gable, and the windows are casements.	II
The Tunstall, wall, railings and gate 52.84348°N 2.34048°W	—	18th century	The farmhouse, which was remodelled in the 19th century, is in brick with bands and a hipped tile roof. There are three storeys, a front range of four bays, and a rear wing. The windows are sashes, those in the lower two floors with cambered heads. The front garden is enclosed by brick walls with stone coping, iron railings, and a foot-gate that has posts with urn finials.	II
The Old Vicarage; 52.84838°N 2.35340°W	—	18th century	The vicarage, later a private house, is in red brick with a band, corbelled dentil eaves, and a hipped tile roof. There are two storeys, a symmetrical front of three bays, and two short rear wings. The doorway has a moulded surround, a rectangular fanlight, and a canopy on shaped brackets. The windows are sashes, those in the ground floor are tripartite.	II
Adbaston Farmhouse; 52.85402°N 2.37257°W	—	Late 18th century	The farmhouse is in brick, and has a tile roof with coped gables. There are three storeys and three bays. On the front is a wood trellis porch, and the windows are sashes with projecting hoods and keyblocks.	II
Lea Hall; 52.85015°N 2.33037°W	—	c. 1800	A house in late Georgian style, it is in brick with a hipped tile roof. There are two storeys and four bays. On the front is a porch with Doric pillars, to its left is a canted bay window with round-headed lights, and the other windows are sashes.	II
Adbaston Hall; 52.84909°N 2.35536°W	—	Early 19th century	A brick house, mostly plastered, with bracketed eaves and a hipped slate roof. There are three storeys and three bays. The porch has a flat roof, and the windows are sashes.	II
Bridge No. 45 (Newport Road Bridge) and stop gate 52.83874°N 2.37792°W		c. 1829–32	The bridge, designed by Thomas Telford, carries Newport Road over the Shropshire Union Canal. It is in stone, and consists of a single elliptical arch. The bridge has voussoirs, band coping, a solid parapet, and piers. On the north side is a modern stop gate.	II
Bridge No. 46 (Knighton Bridge); 52.83932°N 2.37938°W	—	c. 1829–32	The bridge carries a bridleway over the Shropshire Union Canal, and was designed by Thomas Telford. It is in stone, and consists of a single elliptical skew arch. The bridge has band coping, a solid parapet, and piers.	II
Bridge No. 47 (Black Flat Bridge); 52.84101°N 2.38512°W		c. 1829–32	An accommodation bridge over the Shropshire Union Canal, it was designed by Thomas Telford. The bridge is in stone, and consists of a single elliptical arch. It has voussoirs, band coping, a slightly cambered solid parapet, and piers.	II
Farm buildings, Knighton Hall Farm; 52.84185°N 2.37256°W	—	1831	Th farm buildings are in red brick with tile roofs, and form three ranges of cattle stalls with haylofts above around the farmyard. In the northeast front are two projecting taller gabled cross-wings, each with a segmental arch. Between and outside the cross-wings are pitching holes. At the ends, and linking with the side ranges are gabled bays containing two cart entrances. The single-storey side wings contain stable doors, and at the ends are slightly higher pavilions.	II
Milepost 4.5 miles north of Norbury Junction; 52.83952°N 2.38019°W	—	c.1835	The milepost is on the towpath of the Shropshire Union Canal. It is in cast iron, and consists of a short circular post carrying three plates with the distances from Autherley Junction, Nantwich and Norbury Junction.	II
