= Listed buildings in Gnosall =

Gnosall is a civil parish in the Borough of Stafford, Staffordshire, England. It contains 20 listed buildings that are recorded in the National Heritage List for England. Of these, one is listed at Grade I, the highest of the three grades, and the others are at Grade II, the lowest grade. The parish contains the villages of Gnosall and Gnosall Heath and the surrounding area. The Shropshire Union Canal passes through the parish, and the listed buildings associated with it are bridges and two mileposts. The other listed buildings include a church, houses, cottages, farmhouses and farm buildings, a former windmill, a village lock-up, and a milepost on a road.

== Key ==
Grade	Criteria
I	Buildings of exceptional interest, sometimes considered to be internationally important
II	Buildings of national importance and special interest

== Buildings ==
Name and location	Photograph	Date	Notes	Grade
St Lawrence's Church; 52.78529°N 2.25330°W		12th century	Originally a collegiate church, it was altered and extended during the following centuries, including the south porch added by Charles Lynam in 1893. The church incorporates Norman, Early English, Decorated, and Perpendicular features. It has a cruciform plan, consisting of a nave with a clerestory, north and south aisles, a south porch, north and south transepts, north and south chapels, a chancel, and a tower at the crossing. The tower has two stages, a clock face, a saltire frieze, and an embattled parapet with eight crocketed pinnacles. The nave also has embattled parapets.	I
26 and 28 High Street; 52.78453°N 2.25430°W	—	17th century	A pair of cottages with a timber framed core, refronted in the 18th century, and with later alterations, they are on a sandstone plinth and have a dentilled cornice and a tile roof. There are two storeys, each cottage has two bays, and No. 26 has a rear wing. The windows are casements, in the ground floor they have three lights, cambered heads and fluted keystones, and in the upper floor they have two lights. The doorway of No. 28 on the left has pilasters, an entablature, and pyramid motifs at the corners. The doorway of No. 26 has a hood on shaped brackets, and to its left is a canted bay window.	II
Farm House Smallholding; 52.76883°N 2.29317°W	—	17th century	The building is partly timber framed and partly in brick, on a stone plinth, with a thatched roof. There are two storeys and three bays, and the windows are casements.	II
Knightley Gorse Farmhouse; 52.82539°N 2.27734°W	—	17th century	The farmhouse was remodelled and extended in the 19th century. The original part is timber framed, it has been refaced and extended in brick, the north front is rendered, and the roof is tiled. There are two storeys and an attic, a two-bays front, and a later rear wing. On the front is a porch, and the windows are casements, the upper floor windows with gables above.	II
Walnut Tree Farmhouse; 52.77560°N 2.25455°W	—	Late 17th century	The farmhouse is in red brick with a string course, a massive central panelled stack, and a tile roof. There are two storeys, an attic and a basement, an L-shaped plan, a front of two bays, and a rear wing. The windows are modern casements.	II
Former Dukes Head Public House; 52.78517°N 2.25454°W		18th century	The inn, later converted for residential use, is mainly timber framed with brick infill, some brick, partly painted, on a stone plinth, and with a thatched roof. There are two storeys and three bays. On the front are two doorways, one with a flat hood on brackets, a canted bay window, and casement windows, the roof swept over one upper floor window.	II
Barn, Walton Grange; 52.75600°N 2.28660°W	—	18th century (probable)	The barn is in stone with a tile roof. It is a long, low building.	II
Windmill Tower, Broadhill; 52.77279°N 2.29326°W	—	18th century (probable)	The former windmill is in stone and has a circular plan. It tapers and contains rectangular openings.	II
Bridge No 31, (Cowley Double Road Bridge); 52.76809°N 2.25380°W		c. 1830–33	An accommodation bridge over the Shropshire Union Canal crossing a cutting, it was designed by Thomas Telford. The bridge is in stone, and consists of a single elliptical arch with voussoirs. It has a stone band and copings, a plain parapet and piers.	II
Bridge No 32, (Cowley Bridge); 52.77016°N 2.25631°W		c. 1830–33	The bridge, designed by Thomas Telford, carries a road over the Shropshire Union Canal. It is in stone, and consists of a single elliptical arch with voussoirs. The bridge has a stone band and copings, a plain parapet and piers.	II
Bridge No 34, (Pave Lane Road Bridge); 52.77843°N 2.26590°W		c. 1830–33	The bridge, designed by Thomas Telford, carries a road over the Shropshire Union Canal. It is in stone, and consists of a single elliptical skew arch with voussoirs. The bridge has a stone band and copings, a slightly cambered plain parapet and piers.	II
Bridge No 35, (Newport Road Bridge); 52.78049°N 2.26864°W		c. 1830–33	The bridge, designed by Thomas Telford, carries a Newport Road (A518 road) over the Shropshire Union Canal. It is in stone, and consists of a single elliptical arch with voussoirs. The bridge has a stone band and copings, a plain parapet and piers.	II
Bridge No 36, (Plardiwick Bridge); 52.78283°N 2.27488°W		c. 1830–33	An accommodation bridge over the Shropshire Union Canal, it was designed by Thomas Telford. The bridge is in stone, and consists of a single elliptical arch with voussoirs. It has a stone band and copings, a solid parapet and piers.	II
Bridge No 37, (Barn Bridge); 52.78765°N 2.28463°W		c. 1830–33	An accommodation bridge over the Shropshire Union Canal, it was designed by Thomas Telford. The bridge is in stone, and consists of a single elliptical arch with voussoirs. It has a stone band and copings, a slightly cambered solid parapet and piers.	II
Village lock-up 52.78450°N 2.25166°W		1832	The village lock-up was moved to its present site in 1972. It is in rusticated sandstone, with an eaves band, and a sandstone-flagged pyramidal roof with a ball finial. On the front is a doorway with a rusticated surround and a triangular pediment.	II
Aisled cowshed, Coley Farm; 52.77039°N 2.32593°W	—	1830s	The cowshed is on a model farm, and is in red brick with a slate roof. It consists of three parallel ranges with a central aisle. The cowshed contains segmental-arched openings with quoins, and windows with segmental-arched heads. In the gable ends are circular openings.	II
Outbuildings, Coley Farm; 52.77082°N 2.32624°W	—	1830s	The outbuildings on a model farm are in red brick with slate roofs. They include stables, cart sheds, threshing barns, a malthouse and kiln, and a water mill surrounding a cobbled yard.	II
Milepost 2.5 miles south of Norbury Junction; 52.77740°N 2.26469°W		c. 1835	The milepost is on the towpath of the Shropshire Union Canal. It is in cast iron and carries three plates with the distances to Autherley Junction, Nantwich, and Norbury Junction.	II
Milepost 1.5 miles south of Norbury Junction; 52.78577°N 2.28163°W		c. 1835	The milepost is on the towpath of the Shropshire Union Canal. It is in cast iron and carries three plates with the distances to Autherley Junction, Nantwich, and Norbury Junction.	II
Milepost 8 miles from Stafford; 52.82182°N 2.27513°W	—	Mid 19th century	The milepost on the north side of the B5405 road is in cast iron. It is inscribed "Parish of Seighford" and indicates the distances from Stafford, Newport and London.	II
