= Apeton =

Hamlet in Staffordshire, England

Coordinates: 52.761°N 2.222°W

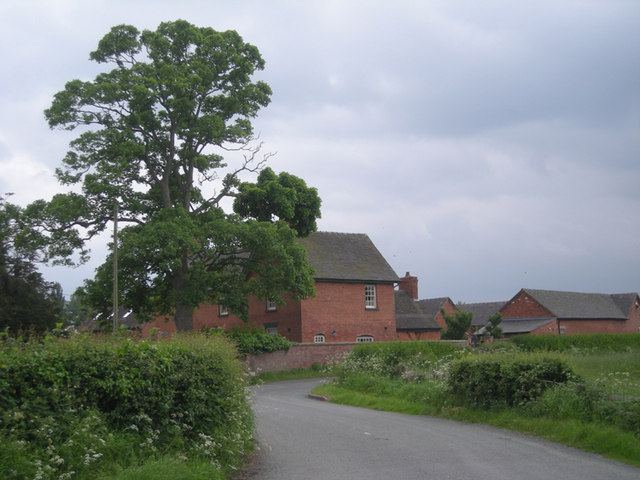
- Farmhouse at Apeton

- Location within Staffordshire
- OS grid reference: SJ850182
- Civil parish: Church Eaton
- District: Stafford
- Shire county: Staffordshire
- Region: West Midlands
- Country: England
- Sovereign state: United Kingdom
- Post town: Stafford
- Postcode district: ST20
- Dialling code: 01785
- Police: Staffordshire
- Fire: Staffordshire
- Ambulance: West Midlands
- UK Parliament: Stone

Apeton is a hamlet in Staffordshire in the West Midlands region of England. It is located 5 1/2 miles (8.9 km) southwest of Stafford, in the civil parish of Church Eaton and the Borough of Stafford.

Apeton is mentioned as Abetone in the 11th-century Domesday Book, when it was part of the land of Robert de Stafford.

In the 1880s it was in the parish of Gnosall, until parts were transferred to Bradley and Haughton. The boundaries were changed again in 1934, when Church Eaton parish was extended to include Apeton to the north.
