= Listed buildings in Norbury, Staffordshire =

Norbury is a civil parish in the Borough of Stafford, Staffordshire, England. It contains 16 listed buildings that are recorded in the National Heritage List for England. Of these, one is listed at Grade I, the highest of the three grades, and the others are at Grade II, the lowest grade. The parish contains the village of Norbury and the surrounding countryside. Passing through the parish is the Shropshire Union Canal, and this meets the former Newport Branch, now disused, at Norbury Junction. Most of the listed buildings are associated with the canal systems, and these include three bridges, two tunnels, a cottage, a boat maintenance workshop, and three mileposts. The other listed buildings are a church, house and associated structures.

== Key ==
Grade	Criteria
II*	Particularly important buildings of more than special interest
II	Buildings of national importance and special interest

== Buildings ==
Name and location	Photograph	Date	Notes	Grade
St Peter's Church; 52.80836°N 2.31843°W		14th century	The tower was added in the 18th century, and the vestry in 1826–29 when the church was restored. The body of the church is in red sandstone, the tower is in brick, and the roofs are tiled. The church consists of a nave, a lower and narrower chancel, a north vestry, and a west tower. The tower is in Georgian style, and the rest of the church is mainly in Decorated style. The tower has three stages, clasping buttresses, a dentilled cornice, and a plain coped parapet.	I
Former Post Office; 52.80858°N 2.32337°W	—	Late 17th century (probable)	The building is partly timber framed with brick infill, and partly in brick, and the roof is thatched. There are two storeys and three bays. The windows are casements, and the roof sweeps over two of the upper floor windows.	II
Old Rectory; 52.80715°N 2.31649°W	—	Early 18th century	The house was extended in 1830. It is in brick with tile roofs, two storeys, and partly with an attic. The original part has three bays, and contains mullioned casement windows with segmental heads. The later part is in Gothic style, it has two bay windows with embattled parapets, and buttresses at the ends.	II
Norbury Park; 52.79549°N 2.29108°W		18th century	A brick house with a tile roof, it has two storeys and an attic, an L-shaped plan, and a front of five bays. In the centre is a gabled porch, and the windows are casements.	II
Canal Tunnel, Shelmore Wood; 52.79124°N 2.29252°W		Late 18th century (probable)	The tunnel carries Norbury Road under the Shropshire Union Canal. It is in stone, and consists of a barrel vault with a round-headed arch at each end.	II
Canal Tunnel, South of Norbury Junction; 52.79920°N 2.30605°W		Late 18th century (probable)	The tunnel carries Norbury Road under the Shropshire Union Canal. It is in stone, and consists of a barrel vault with a round-headed arch at each end.	II
Loynton Hall; 52.81608°N 2.33121°W	—	Late 18th to early 19th century	A brick house with projecting eaves and a tile roof. There are three storeys and five bays. The doorway has Doric columns, a fanlight, and a pediment, and the windows are a mix of sashes and casements with projecting keyblocks.	II
Church Cottage, wall and piggery 52.80798°N 2.31927°W		Early 18th century	A pair of workers' cottages combined into a house, it is in red brick with a tile roof. There are two storeys, a T-shaped plan, and a single storey wing to the southwest containing two large independent bread ovens with one fully intact. The windows are sashes and at eaves level is a decorated bargeboard. The grounds are partly enclosed by a stone wall attached to which is a stone piggery.	II
3 Norbury Junction; 52.80203°N 2.30878°W	—	c. 1829–32	A canal cottage, designed by Thomas Telford, it is in brick with an overhanging slate roof. There is a single storey, and it has a projecting polygonal bay with a hipped roof. The windows are sashes with cambered heads.	II
Bridge No 1, Newport Branch; 52.80251°N 2.30798°W		c. 1829–32	The bridge crosses the entrance to the former Newport Branch of the Shropshire Union Canal. Designed by Thomas Telford, it is in stone, and consists of a single elliptical arch with voussoirs. On the west side is a solid parapet and piers, and on the east side is a low curving parapet.	II
Bridge No 38, (Junction Bridge); 52.80327°N 2.30804°W		c. 1829–32	The bridge, designed by Thomas Telford, carries a road over the Shropshire Union Canal. It is in stone, and consists of a single elliptical arch with voussoirs. The bridge has a stone band and copings, a slightly cambered solid parapet and piers.	II
Bridge No 39, (High Bridge); 52.81513°N 2.31314°W		c. 1832–33	The bridge, designed by Thomas Telford, carries Newport Road (A519 road) over the Shropshire Union Canal. It is in brick, partly rendered, with a parapet in blue engineering brick, and revetment wing walls in rusticated sandstone. The bridge consists of a single span with a round-headed horseshoe arch with a slight skew. At the half-way point is a segmental-arched strained arch surmounted by a wooden telegraph pole. The bridge has a stone band, keystones, and voussoirs. The parapet has chamfered stone coping, and ends in piers with chamfered caps.	II
Boat maintenance workshop 52.80233°N 2.30717°W		Early to mid 19th century	The workshop is a single-storey brick building with an overhanging hipped slate roof. It contains double sliding doors, a bay window, and various other windows with cambered heads. On the west side is a tall tapering chimney stack.	II
Milepost 1.5 miles north of Norbury Junction; 52.82191°N 2.31687°W		c. 1835	The milepost is on the towpath of the Shropshire Union Canal. It is in cast iron and has a short post that carries three plates with the distances to Autherley Junction, Nantwich, and Norbury Junction.	II
Milepost 0.5 miles north of Norbury Junction; 52.80875°N 2.31096°W		c. 1835	The milepost is on the towpath of the Shropshire Union Canal. It is in cast iron and has a short post that carries three plates with the distances to Autherley Junction, Nantwich, and Norbury Junction.	II
Milepost 0.5 miles south of Norbury Junction; 52.79445°N 2.30168°W		c. 1835	The milepost is on the towpath of the Shropshire Union Canal. It is in cast iron and has a short post that carries three plates with the distances to Autherley Junction, Nantwich, and Norbury Junction.	II
