= Listed buildings in Seighford =

Seighford is a civil parish in the Borough of Stafford, Staffordshire, England. It contains 21 listed buildings that are recorded in the National Heritage List for England. Of these, two are at Grade II*, the middle of the three grades, and the others are at Grade II, the lowest grade. The parish contains the villages of Seighford, Derrington, and Great Bridgeford and the surrounding area. Most of the listed buildings are houses, cottages and associated structures, farmhouses and farm buildings, and a high proportion of these are timber framed or have a timber framed core. The other listed buildings consist of a church, a headstone in the churchyard, a public house, a bridge, and two mileposts.

== Key ==
Grade	Criteria
II*	Particularly important buildings of more than special interest
II	Buildings of national importance and special interest

== Buildings ==
Name and location	Photograph	Date	Notes	Grade
St Chad's Church; 52.82238°N 2.17593°W		12th century	The north aisle was added in the 14th–15th century, the nave and tower in 1748, and the church was restored in 1904 by W. D. Caröe. The tower is built in brick, the rest of the church is partly in brick and partly in red and grey sandstone, and the roofs are tiled. The church consists of a nave, a north aisle, a lower and narrower chancel, and a west tower. The tower has three stages, clasping buttresses, a west doorway, clock faces, and an embattled parapet with corner pinnacles.	II*
Seighford Hall; 52.82720°N 2.18466°W		16th century	The house has been much altered and extended, particularly in the 19th century. It is timber framed with tile roofs and has an irregular plan. The house is partly in two storeys and partly in two storeys with an attic, and it has a front of nine bays. Three of the bays project and have gables with carved bargeboards. The windows are mullioned and transomed, and on the roof is a cupola.	II
The Gables; 52.84208°N 2.17337°W	—	Late 16th century	The house, which has been altered, is partly timber framed and partly in colourwashed brick, and has a tile roof. There are two storeys and an attic, an irregular plan, and a front of three bays. The windows are a mix of sashes and casement windows, and there is a two-storey porch.	II
Barn, Lower Cooksland Farm; 52.82868°N 2.18376°W	—	Early 17th century (probable)	The barn is timber framed with brick infill, and has a tile roof.	II
Barn, Seighford Hall; 52.82651°N 2.18480°W	—	Early 17th century (probable)	The barn is timber framed with brick infill on a stone plinth, and has a tile roof.	II
Clanford Hall; 52.81719°N 2.19169°W		1648	The house is timber framed with restoration in colourwashed brick, and a tile roof with gables and finials. There are two storeys and an attic, the upper storey and attic being jettied. The east front has three bays, the middle bay containing a three-storey gabled brick porch. The windows are mullioned casements.	II*
Aston Hall; 52.80876°N 2.16244°W	—	17th century	The house, which was refashioned in the 18th century, is partly in brick and partly timber framed, and has a tile roof. There are two storeys and an attic, and a front of five bays. The doorway has a segmental fanlight and a bracketed hood, and the windows are a mix of sash and casement windows.	II
Blue Cross Farmhouse; 52.80139°N 2.16317°W	—	17th century	Originally a pair of cottages, later altered and combined into one dwelling, it is partly timber framed and party in colourwashed brick, and has a tile roof. There is one storey and an attic, and four bays. On the front is a gabled porch, the windows are casements, and there are two gabled dormers. Inside, there is exposed timber framing.	II
Bridgeford Hall; 52.84278°N 2.17527°W	—	17th century (probable)	The house, which was much altered in the 18th century, has a timber framed core, and has been refaced in brick. It has a tile roof with coped gables. There are two storeys and an attic, and a front of three bays. The doorway has a rectangular fanlight, the windows are three dormers.	II
Derrington Hall; 52.80104°N 2.16542°W	—	17th century	The house was later enlarged. It is roughcast with a string course and a tile roof. There are two storeys and an attic, and a front of six bays, the left two bays being lower. On the front is a two-storey gabled porch, and the windows are casements.	II
Hollybush Inn; 52.82196°N 2.17895°W	—	17th century	A cottage, later altered and developed into a public house, it is timber framed with red brick infill and a tile roof. There is one storey and an attic, a front of two bays, a later extension with a catslide roof to the right of the front, and rear additions. The doorway has an architrave with a dated lintel, to the right is a small-paned window, and above is a dormer.	II
Lower Cooksland Farmhouse; 52.82848°N 2.18387°W	—	17th century	The farmhouse, which was later altered, is timber framed with brick infill and has a tile roof. There are two storeys and two bays, and the windows are casements.	II
Stallbrook Hall; 52.80002°N 2.17162°W	—	17th century	The house has a timber framed core, it is mainly encased in red brick, and has floor bands and a tile roof. The house is partly in two storeys, and partly in two storeys and an attic, and has an L-shaped plan. The doorway has pilasters, and most of the windows are casements. There is exposed timber framing on the gable of the north wing.	II
Village Farmhouse; 52.82354°N 2.18199°W	—	17th century (probable)	The farmhouse is timber framed with infill in colourwashed brick, and it has a tile roof. There is one storey and an attic, and three bays. Above the doorway is a flat hood on brackets, the windows are casements, and there are three gabled dormers.	II
Holly Bush Farmhouse; 52.80853°N 2.16056°W	—	Late 17th century (probable)	The farmhouse is partly timber framed and partly in brick, and has a tile roof. There are two storeys and an attic, and a front of two bays. The windows are casements.	II
Barn southeast of Village Farmhouse; 52.82341°N 2.18127°W	—	1758	The barn and cowshed form two ranges at right angles, and are in brick with some internal timber framing. The barn contains double doors, six rows of dove-holes and flight perches, ventilation holes, and a stables with stable doors. The cowshed has three bays.	II
Elizabeth Tilsley Headstone; 52.82226°N 2.17594°W	—	1787	The headstone is in the churchyard of St Chad's Church, and is to the memory of Elizabeth Tilsley. The headstone is carved in fine relief, and depicts the Good Samaritan.	II
Bridgeford Bridge; 52.83993°N 2.17413°W	—	Early 19th century (probable)	The bridge carries the A5013 road over the River Sow. It is in stone and consists of a single wide segmental arch. The bridge has a moulded string course and piers with channelled masonry.	II
Milepost 4 miles from Stafford; 52.83560°N 2.18848°W	—	Mid 19th century	The milepost is on the north side of the Newport to Stafford road (B5405 road). It is in cast iron, and has a triangular plan and a sloping top, and is inscribed "Parish of Seighford". On the top is the distance to London, and on the sides the distances to Newport and Stafford.	II
Milepost 5 miles from Stafford; 52.82965°N 2.20796°W	—	Mid 19th century	The milepost is on the north side of the Newport to Stafford road (B5405 road). It is in cast iron, and has a triangular plan and a sloping top, and is inscribed "Parish of Seighford". On the top is the distance to London, and on the sides the distances to Newport and Stafford.	II
Former Coach House and Dovecote, Seighford Hall; 52.82635°N 2.18468°W	—	Undated	The former coach house and dovecote are in brick. The coach house to the left has two storeys and three bays, and a stepped gable. In the ground floor are three segmental arches and a doorway with a plain surround, and the upper floor contains casement windows. The dovecote is a three-storey tower with quoins, a string course, and an embattled parapet. There is a blocked window with a pointed head on each front, and three mock arrow loops, also blocked.	II
