= St Lawrence's Church, Gnosall =

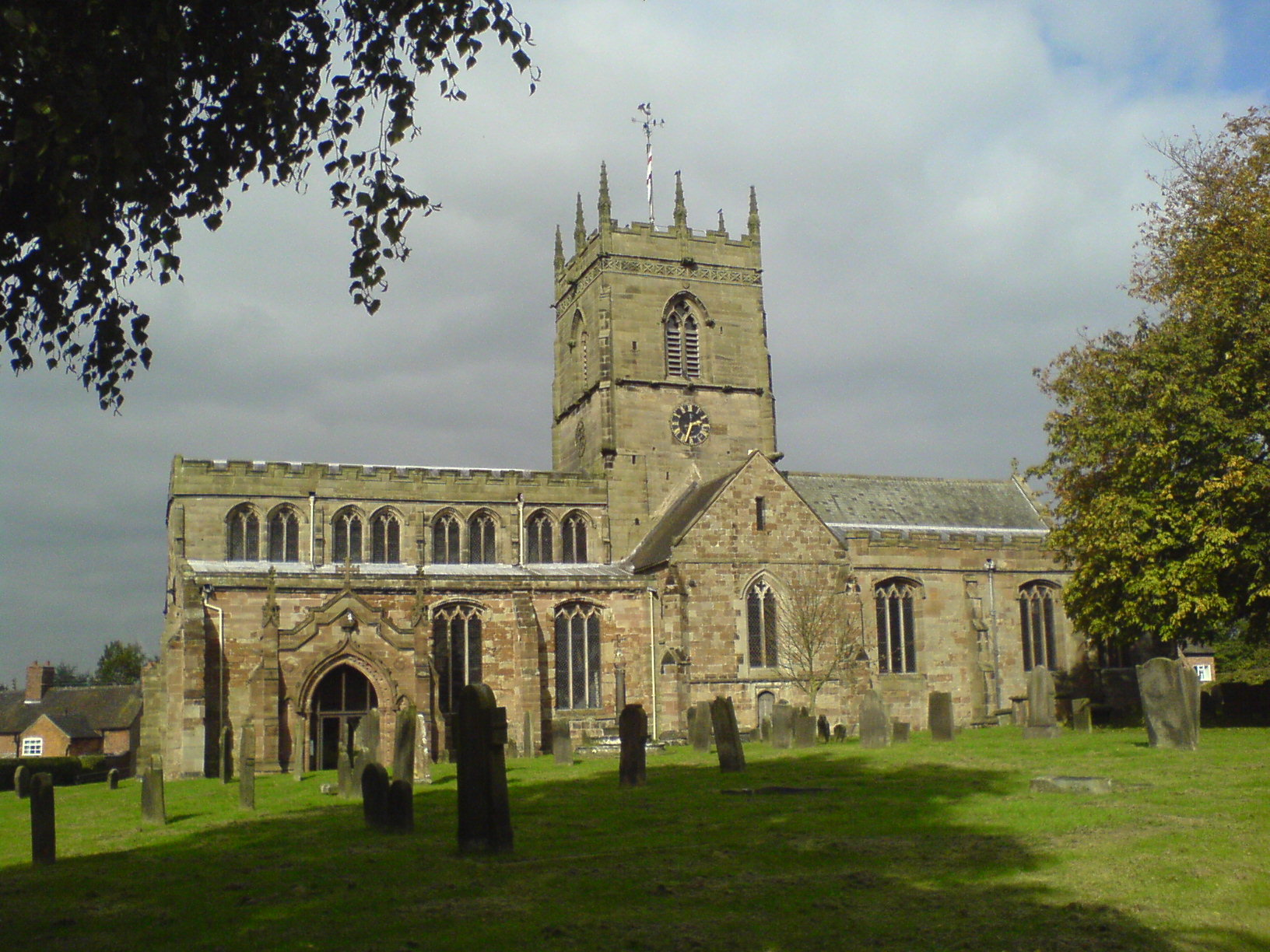
- View from the south
- St Lawrence's Church, Gnosall
- 52°47′07″N 2°15′12″W
- OS grid reference: SJ 830 209
- Location: Gnosall, Staffordshire
- Country: England
- Denomination: Church of England
- Website: http://www.gnosallparish.org.uk/

Architecture
- Heritage designation: Grade I
- Designated: 15 January 1968
- Architectural type: Norman architecture

Administration
- Diocese: Diocese of Lichfield
- Deanery: Eccleshall Deanery

St Lawrence's Church is an Anglican church in Gnosall, Staffordshire, England. It is a Grade I listed building. The earliest parts of the church are of Norman architecture; it later saw a variety of modifications.

== Early history ==
There was a church here in Anglo-Saxon times; this was replaced by a Norman church. The building is cruciform and has a central tower. The earliest parts, the arches of the central crossing, and much of the walling, date from the 12th century.

It is thought it may have been a collegiate church, controlled by the monarch, not by the diocese in which it lies.

== Later modifications ==
In the 13th century aisles, of three bays, were added to the nave; the triple lancet window and doorway at the west end were installed, and the south doorway.

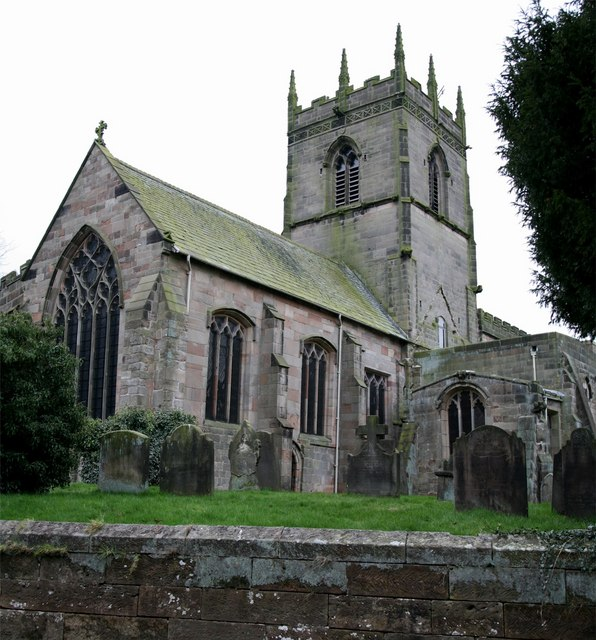
View from the north-east

The north transept was rebuilt, with a lower roof (the earlier roofline is visible) and a double lancet window, of the 13th century, in the end wall. The south transept is little changed from the original form. The five-light east window is of the 14th century.

In the 15th century the upper part of the tower was built, and the clerestory was added. A lady chapel, with a parapet, was built on the south side of the chancel about 1500.

More recently, the porch for the south doorway, designed by Charles Lynam, was built in 1893. The north vestry, designed by Horsley, Huber and Associates of Stafford, was built in the 1990.

== See also ==
- Grade I listed churches in Staffordshire
- Listed buildings in Gnosall
