= Great Bridgeford railway station =

Disused railway station in Staffordshire, England

Great Bridgeford
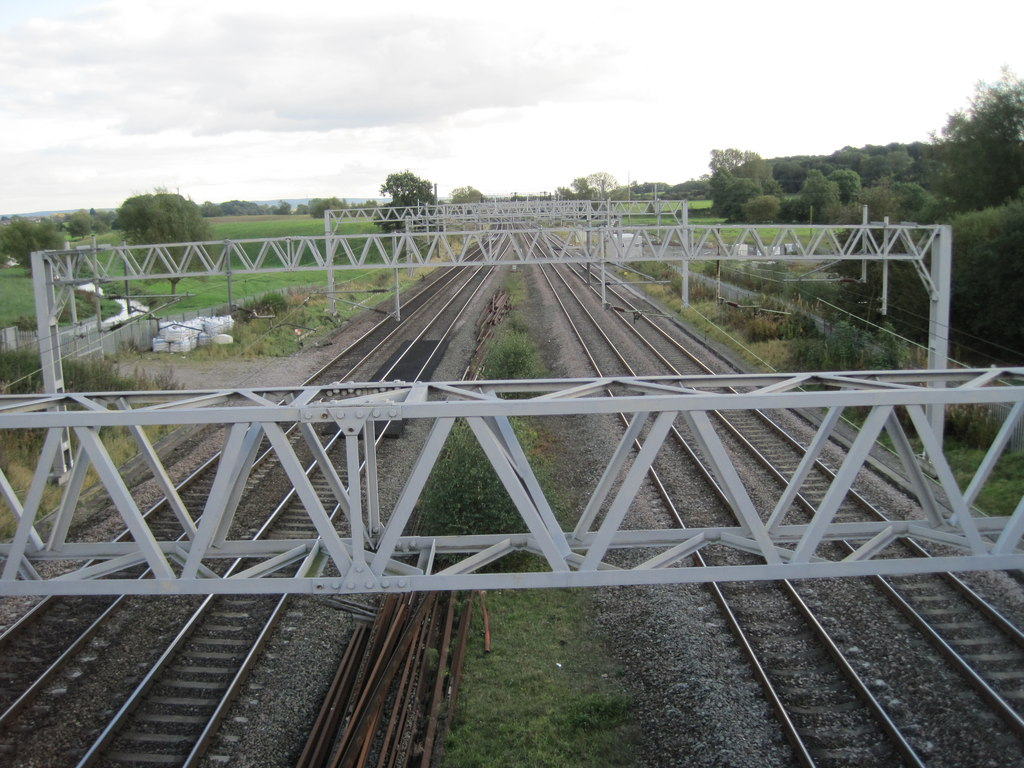
- The site of the station in 2012

General information
- Location: Great Bridgeford, Staffordshire; England
- Coordinates: 52.8393°N 2.1745°W
- Grid reference: SJ883268
- Platforms: 4

Other information
- Status: Disused

History
- Original company: Grand Junction Railway
- Pre-grouping: London and North Western Railway
- Post-grouping: London, Midland and Scottish Railway

Key dates
- 4 July 1837: First station opened as Bridgeford
- 10 September 1840: First station closed
- 1 December 1876: Second station opened as Great Bridgeford some distance away from the site of Bridgeford station
- 8 August 1949: Closed to passengers
- 1959: Closed completely
Location

Great Bridgeford railway station served the village of Great Bridgeford, Staffordshire, England from 1837 to 1959 on the Stafford-Manchester line.

== History ==
=== First station ===
The first station opened as Bridgeford on 4 July 1837 by the Grand Junction Railway. It had two platforms. It closed on 10 September 1840.

=== Second station ===
The second station was built by the London and North Western Railway some distance from the site of the former station and was named Great Bridgeford. This station had four platforms. It opened on 1 December 1876, closed to passengers on 8 August 1949 and to goods traffic in 1959.

== Accident ==
On 17 June 1932 at 7:23 pm, an express train, hauled by LNWR Whale Precursor Class 4-4-0 No. 5278 Precursor, derailed at the south end of the station. Four passengers were killed and 27 were injured, 9 of these severely, including the driver. A further 24 people, including the guard, suffered minor injuries.

Preceding station	Historical railways	Following station
Bridgeford; Line open, station closed	Grand Junction Railway; Stafford-Manchester Line	Stafford
