= Knightley, Staffordshire =

Hamlet in Staffordshire, England

Coordinates: 52.823°N 2.281°W

Knightley is a hamlet and former manor in Staffordshire, England. It is situated near the villages of Gnosall and Woodseaves, now on the B5405 road.

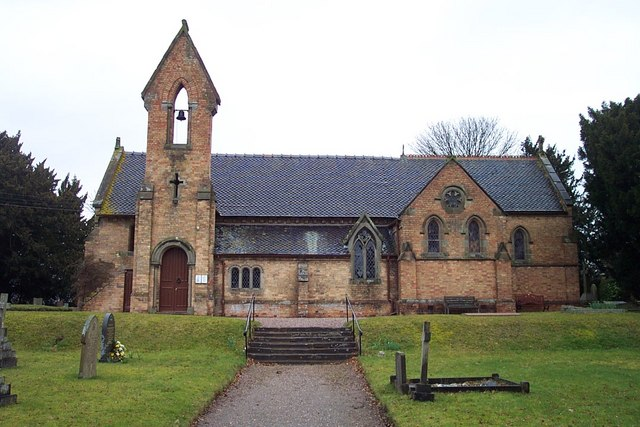
Knightley

There is a church, an agricultural contractor, a few farms and houses and an old blacksmiths.

The hamlet is on the site of a former Roman military station, which was called Mediolanum.

== de Knightley family ==
The prominent de Knightley family originated at the Staffordshire manor of Knightley, acquired by them shortly after the Norman Conquest of 1066. The Domesday Book of 1086 lists the tenant of Chenistelei as Rainald, namely "Reginald the Sheriff", who held 88 manors throughout England, said to be the ancestor of this family. Mark Noble (1787) wrote of the de Knightley family:

There is no private family in the kingdom has given more knights; none which has been more numerous in its branches; some of them have almost rivalled the eldest in consequence, and that fettled in France surpassed them, having many centuries ago been declared noble; the alliances they have contracted have been equal to themselves, and the many high offices held by them in the state, have been exceeded only by the very large possessions they have constantly had.

In 1415 Sir Richard Knightley purchased the manor of Fawsley in Northamptonshire, where the senior line of the family became seated. Branches of the family became Knightley baronets, of which two titles were created, and in 1892 Rainald Knightley, 1st Baron Knightley (1819-1895) was created Baron Knightley "of Fawsley" in the Peerage of the United Kingdom.
