= Adbaston =

Civil parish in Staffordshire, England

Coordinates: 52.8481°N 2.35444°W

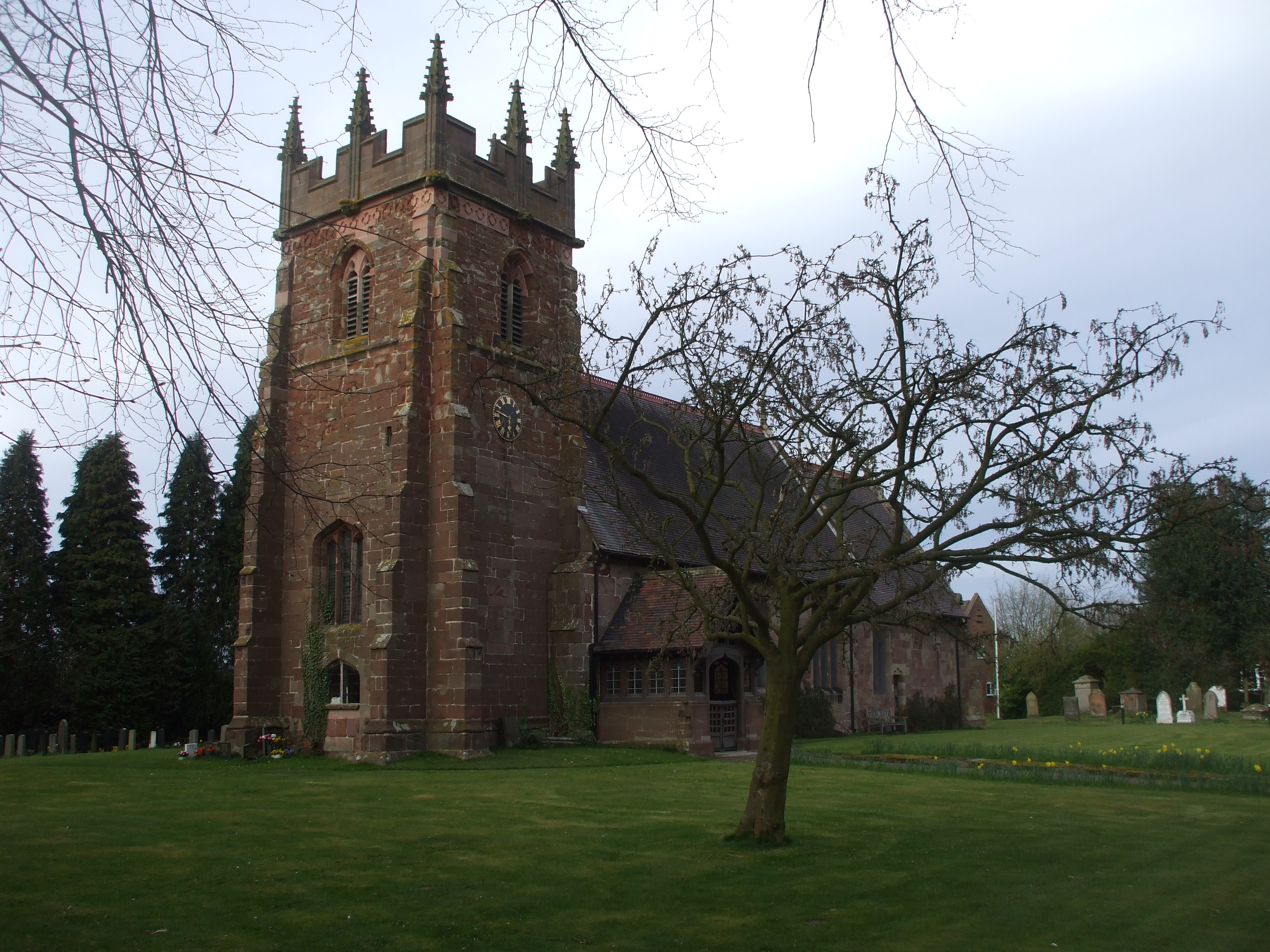
- The Parish Church of Saint Michael and All Angels

- Location within Staffordshire
- Population: 561 (2011)
  - London: 153 miles
- District: Stafford
- Shire county: Staffordshire
- Region: West Midlands
- Country: England
- Sovereign state: United Kingdom
- Post town: STAFFORD
- Postcode district: ST20
- Dialling code: 01785
- Police: Staffordshire
- Fire: Staffordshire
- Ambulance: West Midlands
- UK Parliament: Stafford

Adbaston is a village and a civil parish in the English county of Staffordshire.

== Location ==
The village is 13 miles (20.9 km) north east of the town of Stafford, and 18.4 miles (29.6 km) south east of Stoke on Trent. The nearest railway station is at Stone. The nearest main roads are the A41 which passes the village 4.7 miles (7.6 km) to the south west. The village is situated approximately halfway between towns of Eccleshall and Newport, Shropshire, and near the villages and hamlets of Cheswardine, Shropshire, and Woodseaves, High Offley and Knighton, Staffordshire.

== History ==
=== Etymology ===
The name Adbaston is derived from the Anglo-Saxon personal name Eadbald and means 'Eadbald's town'; it was recorded in the Domesday Book of 1086 as Edboldestone and in the 12th and 13th century as Adbaldestone, Alboldestun, and Albaldiston.

=== Domesday Book ===
Adbaston is listed in the Domesday Book of 1086; in the survey the village has the name Edboldestone. In the survey the settlement was described as quite small with only 5.8 households. Other assets included 17 villagers or villeins, meadow of 15 acres, 40 smallholders and 1 slave. There was also 25 ploughlands (land for), 3 lord's plough teams, 13 men's plough teams. In 1066 the lord of the manor was Robert, Bishop of Chester. Before that the lord of the manor was said to have been previously Leofwine Bishop of Lichfield.

=== Present day ===
The village contains a church, "St Michael and All Angels", and a phone box. There was once a school but it closed due to diminishing numbers of children.

== See also ==
- Listed buildings in Adbaston
