= Seighford Hall =

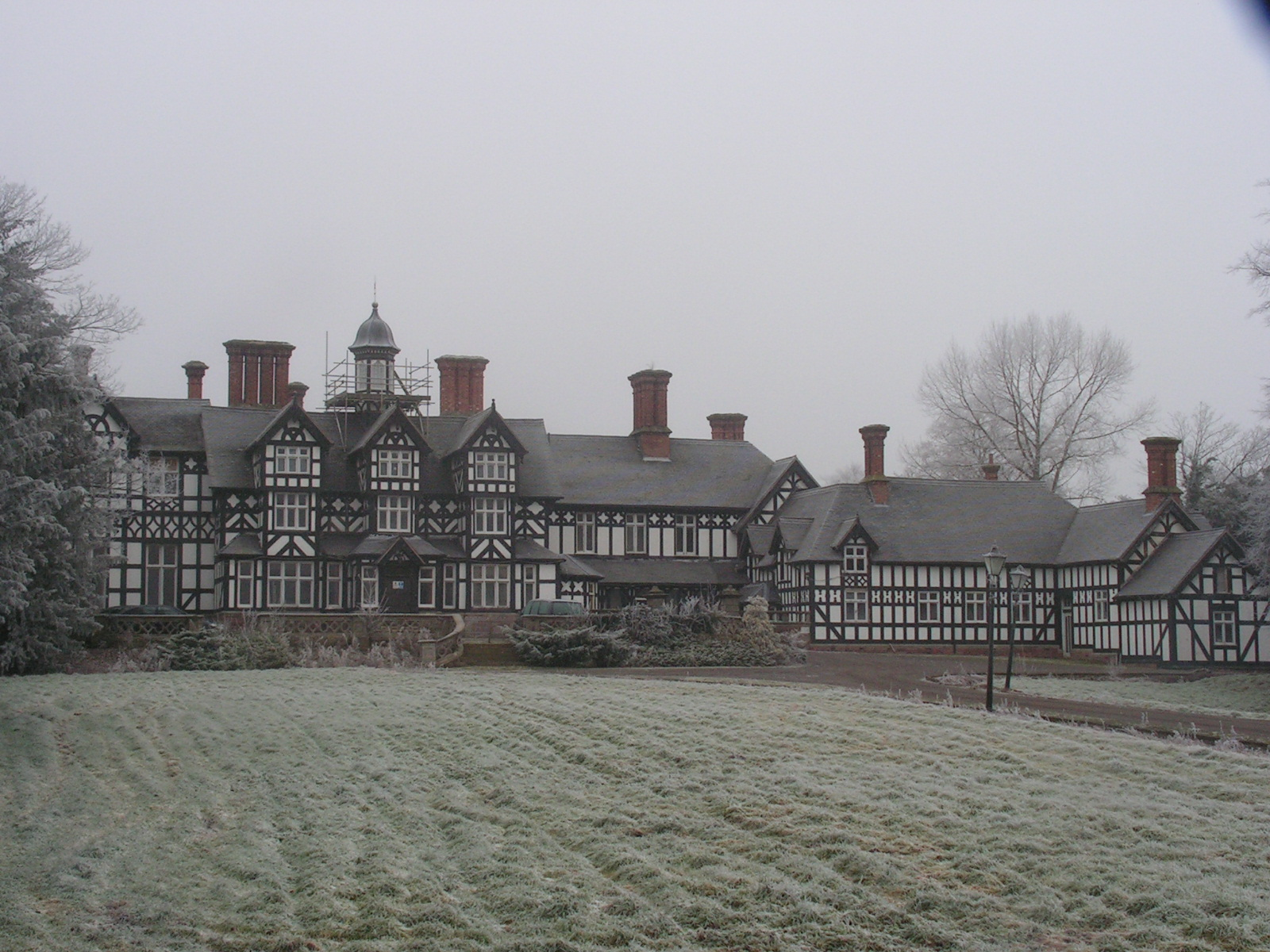

- Location within Staffordshire
- 52°49′37.92″N 2°11′4.56″W
- Location: Seighford
- OS grid reference: SJ 87650 25532

History
- Began: c. late 16th to early-17th century

Site notes
- Owner: First Blue Group Limited

Listed Building – Grade II
- Designated: 1953
- Reference no.: 1258046

Seighford Hall is a house that lies slightly to north-west of the core of Seighford, England. It appears to have later- 16th to early-17th origins but the radical later changes made to it – particularly in the 19th century – make an accurate assessment difficult. There seems to be no doubt that it was built on a greenfield site for the Elde family – and almost certainly for Richard Eld (1546–1621). In 1574 Richard Elde of Seighford was granted a coat of arms and crest by the Ulster King of Arms; Eld had been born in Derbyshire and had managed to be appointed Treasurer and Steward to the notorious Walter Devereux, 1st Earl of Essex and Earl Marshal of England (1541–76).

Eld was paymaster of Essex's army during his brutal campaigns in Ireland. Essex had strong Staffordshire connections, being the 11th Baron Ferrers of Chartley and Lord Lieutenant of the county; this could be why Eld came into possession of Seighford – and is generally considered to be the original owner of the Hall. The Elds continue to hold the Seighford Estate to this day (the Hall and approx 17 acres was sold out of the Estate in 1963) and the Family Seat has now moved to the adjacent Cooksland Hall.

In 1666 Francis Elde, presumably then living at Seighford Hall, was assessed for six hearths in the Staffordshire Hearth Tax; this suggests a relatively large house – consistent with the surviving timber-framed section of the existing house – but not a very large one; it wasn't even the biggest within the Seighford Constablewick – which belonged to Sir Thomas Whitgreauve, who was assessed for eight hearths.

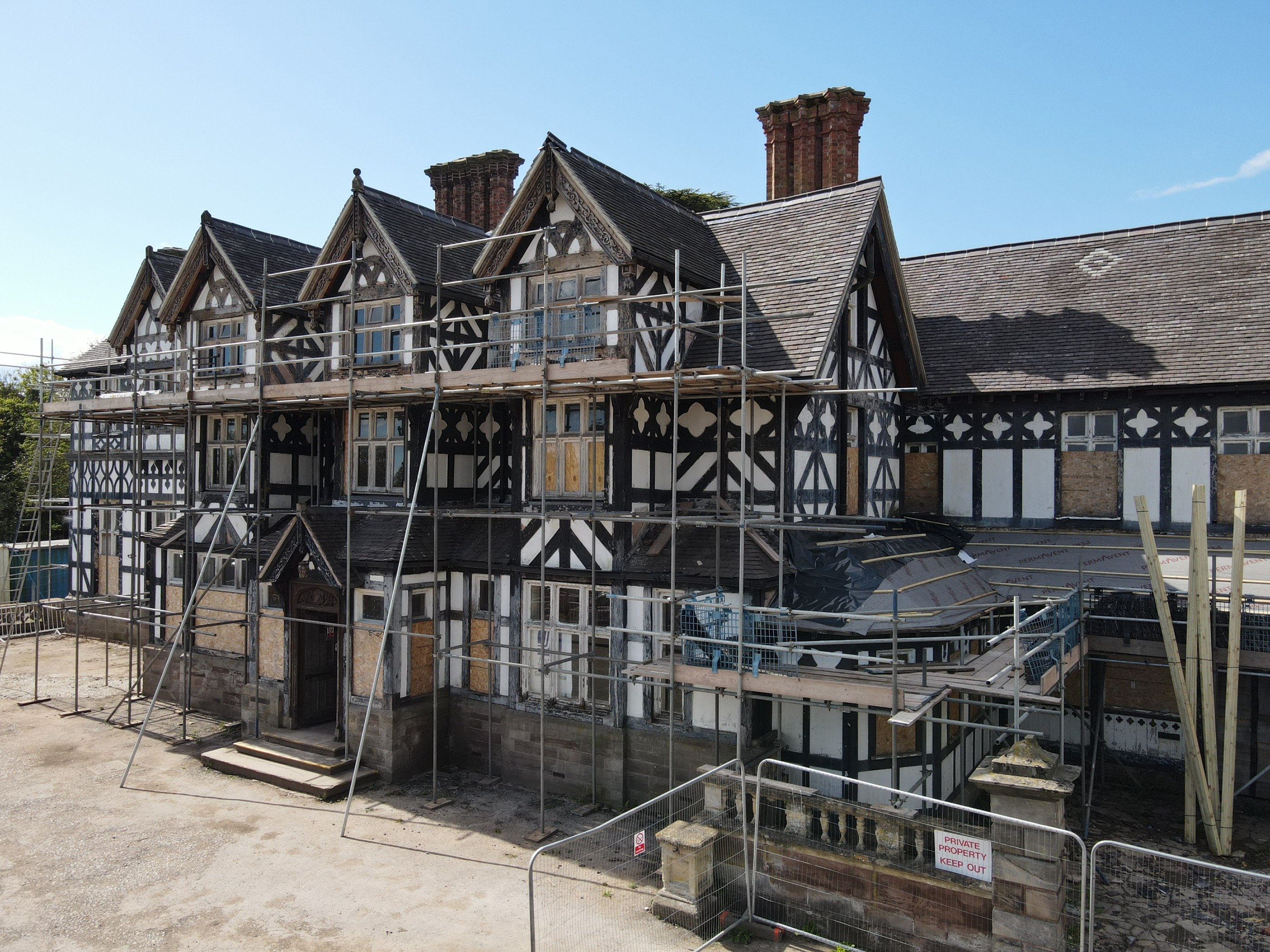
Seighford Hall Image.jpg

After the death of Francis Elde of Seighford in 1760 without issue, the estate passed to his half- brother, John Elde of Dorking, Surrey. A promoter and benefactor of the Stafford General Infirmary (built 1769–72), a full-length portrait of him holding the original plans was painted by renowned society painter Thomas Gainsborough.

After his death in 1796, aged 92, it passed to his son, Francis Eld (the last ‘e’ of the name having been abandoned), who also lived to a great age, dying in 1817 aged 87. By that time it seems that the house had been extended considerably with the addition of brick-built wings to either side of the original; the possible dates for these is considered later. Thomas Peploe Wood's watercolour of the front of Seighford Hall is the earliest known illustration of the property and is dated 1838 and may have been the source material of other illustrations. It shows the original timber-framed house presumably in something like its original condition. The framing pattern shown is similar, but by no means identical, to the present facade.

One obvious difference is the fact that the east gable of this range seems to be intact – with shallow jetties at first and attic floor levels; it is now of brick with painted framing. The watercolour also shows that the ground and first floor windows were then large balanced sashes, obviously inserted, and that the attic windows were smaller. At ground floor level there are four curious projecting porches between the projecting wings. The sashes would suggest a Georgian modernisation of the property – possibly coinciding with the known Georgian additions to it. Seighford Hall was described in White's Directory of 1834 as ‘an ancient half-timbered house with modern wings, standing in a small but well-wooded park, on the west side of the village’.

In June 2020, Seighford Hall was acquired by the First Blue Group Limited.

I
