= Derrington =

Village in Staffordshire, England

Coordinates: 52°48′N 2°10′W

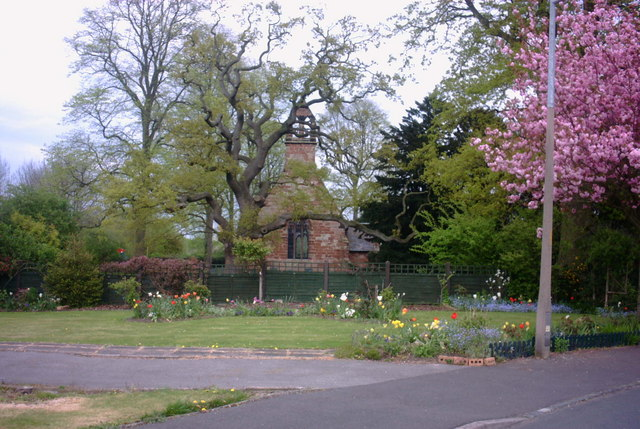
- St Matthew's parish church

- Location within Staffordshire
- Area: 0.222 km^{2} (0.086 sq mi)
- Population: 630 (2025 estimate)
  - Density: 2,838/km^{2} (7,350/sq mi)
- Civil parish: Seighford
- District: Stafford
- Shire county: Staffordshire
- Region: West Midlands
- Country: England
- Sovereign state: United Kingdom
- Police: Staffordshire
- Fire: Staffordshire
- Ambulance: West Midlands
- Website: http://www.derringtonvillage.co.uk/

Derrington is a village in the civil parish of Seighford, in the Stafford district, in Staffordshire, England, west of the town of Stafford. In 2025 it had an estimated population of 630.

Derrington had an 18th-century pub, The Red Lion, but it has ceased trading, and a village hall.

The Church of England parish church of Saint Matthew is a Gothic Revival building completed in 1847.

The route of the abandoned Shropshire Union Railway between Stafford and Shrewsbury passes the village.

== See also ==
- Listed buildings in Seighford
