= Seighford =

Village and civil parish in Staffordshire, England

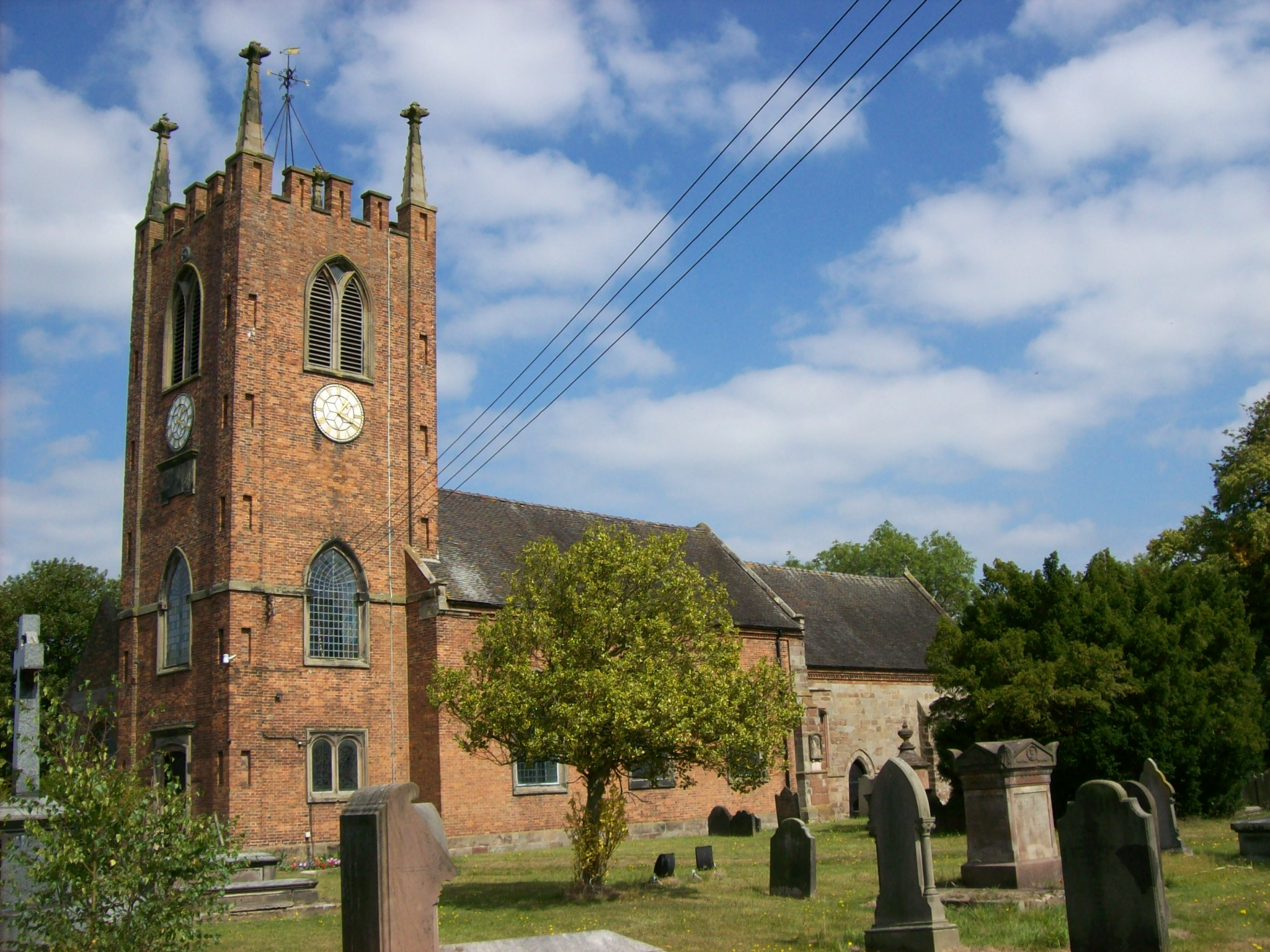
St Chad's parish church

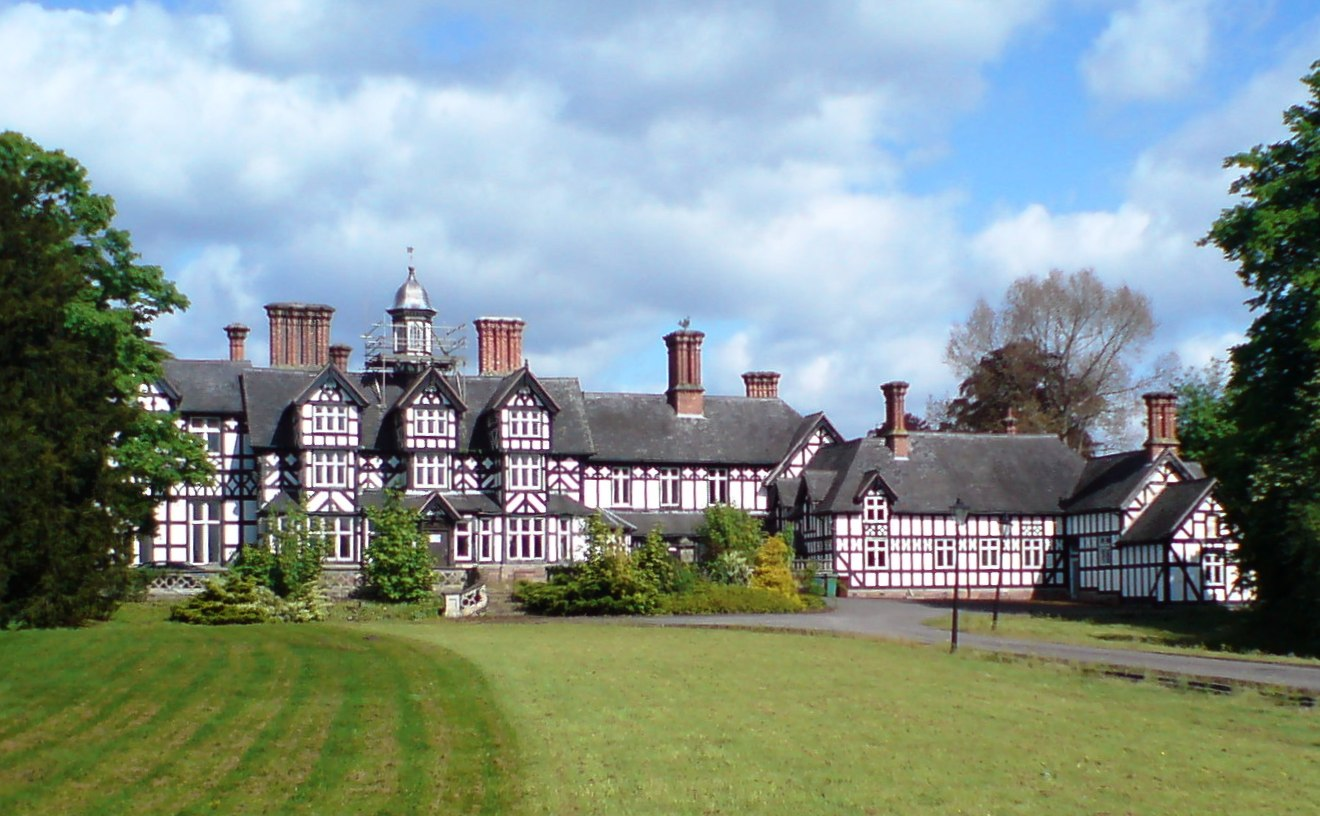
Seighford Hall, viewed from the south

Seighford (/ˈsaɪfərd/ SY-fərd) is a village and civil parish about 3 miles (5 km) west of Stafford in Staffordshire, England. The population of this civil parish at the 2011 census was 1,793. The ford across a small stream is the origin of the village's toponym. The village has a red brick Church of England parish church, St Chad's, and Seighford Hall, a 16th-century Tudor mansion.

== History ==
William White's History, Gazetteer and Directory of Staffordshire (1851) described the village:

Seighford is a scattered village above a small brook which flows east from Latford pool to the River Sow. Its parish contains the hamlets of Aston and Derrington, from one to one and a half miles east, Coton Clanford, one mile south, and Great and Little Bridgeford, three and a half miles north-east of Stafford. Doxey, east of the M6 motorway, became a separate civil parish in 2005. It forms a highly cultivated district, containing 803 inhabitants and 3,830 acres of land. Francis Eld, Esq, is lord of the manor and owner of most of the soil. He resides at Seighford Hall, an ancient house with modern wings, on the west side of the village…the Parish Church, St Chad, was partly rebuilt of brick about 100 years ago, and contains many neat mural monuments. It has a brick tower, five bells and a clock ... there is a small Wesleyan Chapel at Little Bridgeford, built in 1850."

== Amenities ==
The village school is Cooper Perry Primary School.

RAF Seighford was a Royal Air Force airfield that was opened in 1943 and closed in 1947. Remains of the control tower and some outbuildings survive. Part of the site is still used by small aircraft, particularly gliders, along with a small runway close to the village of Seighford.

== St Chad's ==
The parish church of St Chad, was originally built around the time of the Norman Conquest. Some historians maintain there was a wooden Saxon church before that built around 650 AD. The earliest stone remains are Saxon, and two four-column arcades are early Norman with typical billet and lozenge carving on the capitals. Shortly before 1600, the original Norman tower collapsed. The south side of the aisle and the main entrance were destroyed. The church was partly rebuilt in brick in about 1610 by a local builder called Clay. The parish register dates from 1561.

== Notable people ==
- Richard Cocks (1566–1624) head of the British East India Company trading post in Hirado, Japan, 1613 to 1623; baptised at St Chad's, Seighford.
- Sir (Edwin) Cooper Perry (1856–1938), a physician and medical administrator, the only son of Edwin Cresswell Perry (1828–1899), who became vicar of Seighford in 1861. Perry was brought up in the village and became Vice-Chancellor of London University from 1917–19.

== See also ==
- Listed buildings in Seighford
