= Gnosall =

Village in Staffordshire, England

Coordinates: 52.7850°N 2.2528°W

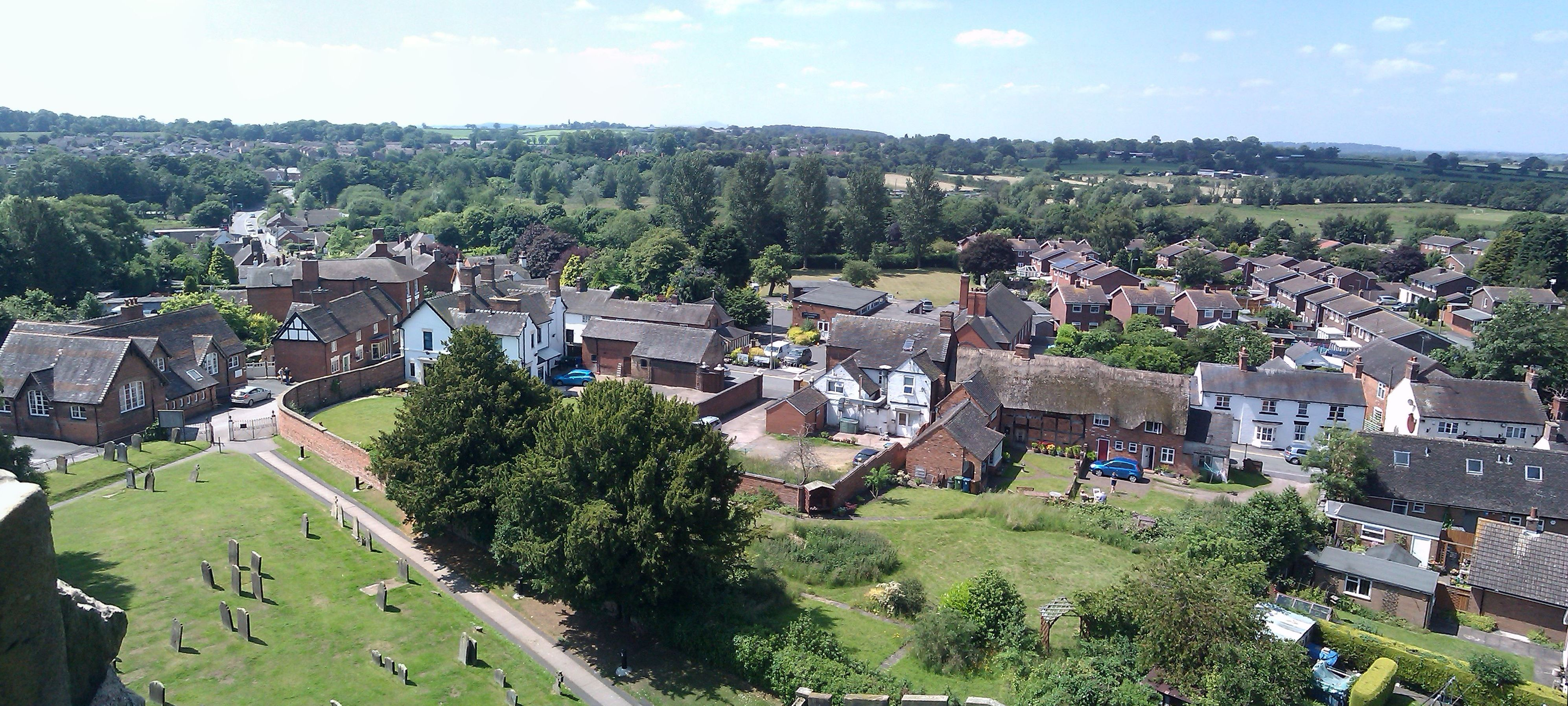

- Location within Staffordshire
- Area: 37.77 km^{2} (14.58 sq mi)
- Population: 5,040
  - Density: 133/km^{2} (340/sq mi)
- OS grid reference: SJ830208
- District: Stafford
- Shire county: Staffordshire
- Region: West Midlands
- Country: England
- Sovereign state: United Kingdom
- Post town: STAFFORD
- Postcode district: ST20
- Dialling code: 01785
- Police: Staffordshire
- Fire: Staffordshire
- Ambulance: West Midlands
- UK Parliament: Stafford

Gnosall (/noʊsəl/) is a village and civil parish in the Borough of Stafford, Staffordshire, England, with a population of 5,040 across 2,300 households (2021 census). It lies on the A518, approximately halfway between the towns of Newport (in Shropshire) and the county town of Staffordshire, Stafford. Gnosall Heath lies immediately south-west of the main village, joined by Station Road and separated by Doley Brook. Other nearby villages include Woodseaves, Knightley, Cowley, Ranton, Church Eaton, Bromstead Heath, Moreton, and Haughton.

== History ==
The village was mentioned in the Domesday Book, in which it was named Geneshale. It is listed there as having a population of 12 households. According to research presented online by the University of Nottingham, the name Gnosall derives from a combination of the Old Welsh Genou meaning 'mouth' and the Mercian word halh meaning 'a nook of land' or 'a small valley' or 'dry ground in marsh.' The Gnosall Parish Council also believes that Gnosall derives from both Genou and halh, however believes that halh actually stands for 'low-lying land by a river' and states that Gnosall translates to a ‘narrow valley that suddenly opens out into a wider one’. That same site also states that there are at least 27 different spellings of the name, the oldest surviving record being for Geneshale in the Domesday Book of 1086, and that it is only by chance that Gnosall is the current spelling.

The Stafford to Shrewsbury railway line once ran through the village. Gnosall's railway station opened on 1 June 1849 and closed on 6 August 1966. The line was built by the Shropshire Union Railways and Canal Company, which also managed the Shropshire Union Canal which runs through the village. A footpath, the Way for the Millennium, now follows its route.

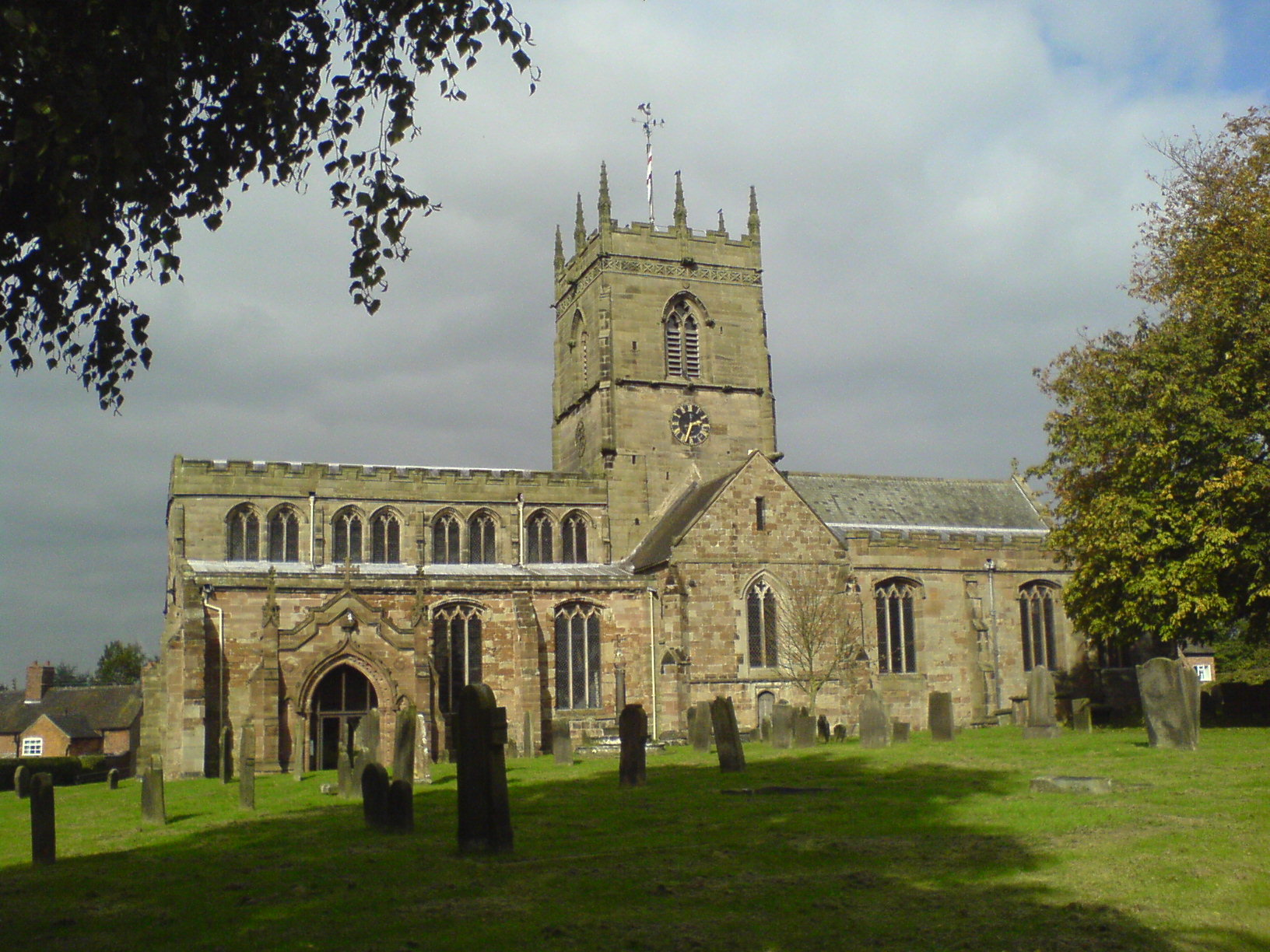
St. Lawrence's Church

Landmarks of interest include:

- St. Lawrence's Church, which dates from Norman times and stands over the site of an earlier Saxon church.
- Coton Mill, where local rumours suggest self-raising flour was invented (despite strong evidence it was created in 1845, by Henry Jones, a baker in Bristol).
- The lock-up, originally built on Station Road some time after 10 June 1820, when its construction was scheduled, and moved to its current site on Sellman Street in 1971.

There are also several old, privately owned, buildings such as the Duke's Head on the High Street that was previously a public house. With a thatched roof, and herring-bone brick pattern between faded, unpainted wooden beams, it may be suggested that it forms one of the most picturesque scenes in the village.

A new primary school opened in 2016 replacing the building constructed as Heronbrook School. This building was unusual in that it was designed to appear attractive from the railway line passing behind it rather than from the front.

== Amenities ==
Gnosall is fairly self-contained in terms of shops and amenities, with its own fire station, supermarket, doctor's surgery, one dental practice, petrol station, sports club, take-aways, five pubs and historic high street.

Gnosall Heath has two canalside pubs, The Boat and The Navigation. The Acorn (previously the Royal Oak) is situated on the main A518. In Gnosall village centre may be found The Horns and George and the Dragon, the latter a micropub which opened in 2015. The Sports Club is situated in extensive grounds off the 1970s Brookhouse Estate.

Many of the village's ancient traditions are still honoured today, notably the carnival, where children dress up in themed costumes, and a parade complete with custom made floats and a brass band that runs to the Grosvener Centre field from the Royal Oak.

A large health centre was completed in 2006 at the opposite end of Gnosall from the old doctor's surgery which was situated by the fire station; tribute to the rapid increase in population of recent years.

The village has a community first responder group, a charity consisting of trained local people who provide emergency cover on behalf of West Midlands Ambulance Service in response to 999 calls and administer basic life support, oxygen therapy, defibrillation and first aid whilst an ambulance is en route.

The village's newspaper; "GPN" (Gnosall Parish News), is produced and sold in the village, and serves as a local advertiser of services and events, as well as publishing articles of interest to the local community.

The dentist, previously at the health centre was moved into the old optometrist on the A518, opposite the supermarket under the name Brookhouse Dental Practice.

Despite there being controversy over the legality, fishing is popular and fruitful on the canal.

Gnosall is served Monday to Sunday by Arriva bus service 5 and 5A linking the village to Stafford, Newport and Telford.

== Notable people ==
- The Rev. Adam Blakeman (1596–1665), the Puritan minister who founded the early American town of Stratford, Connecticut, in 1639, was born in Gnosall.

== See also ==
- Listed buildings in Gnosall
