= Great Bridgeford =

Village in Staffordshire, England

Coordinates: 52°50′N 2°10′W

Great Bridgeford is a village in the Borough of Stafford, Staffordshire, England, and a ward of Seighford civil parish. Population details taken at the 2011 census can be found under Seighford. It lies on the A5013 and is the point where the B5405 meets the A5013. The hamlet of Little Bridgeford is on the A5013 a short distance to the north.

The village lies on the West Coast Main Line (London to Glasgow) railway and contains a village hall, and two tennis courts.

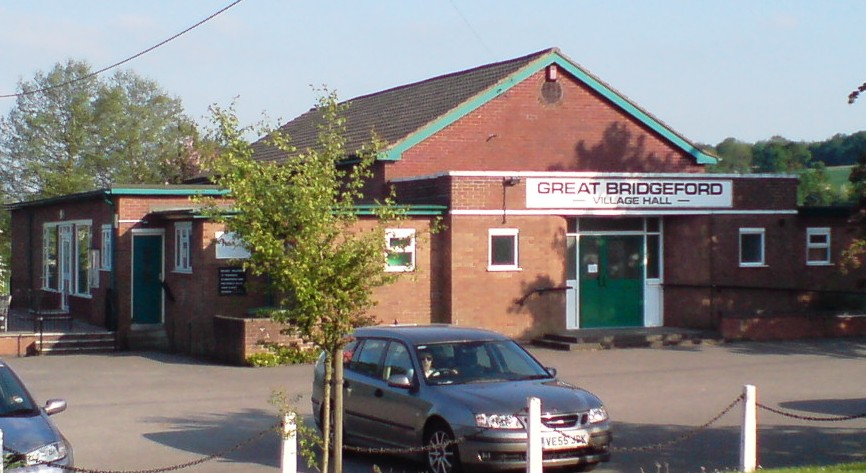
Great Bridgeford village Hall, May 2008

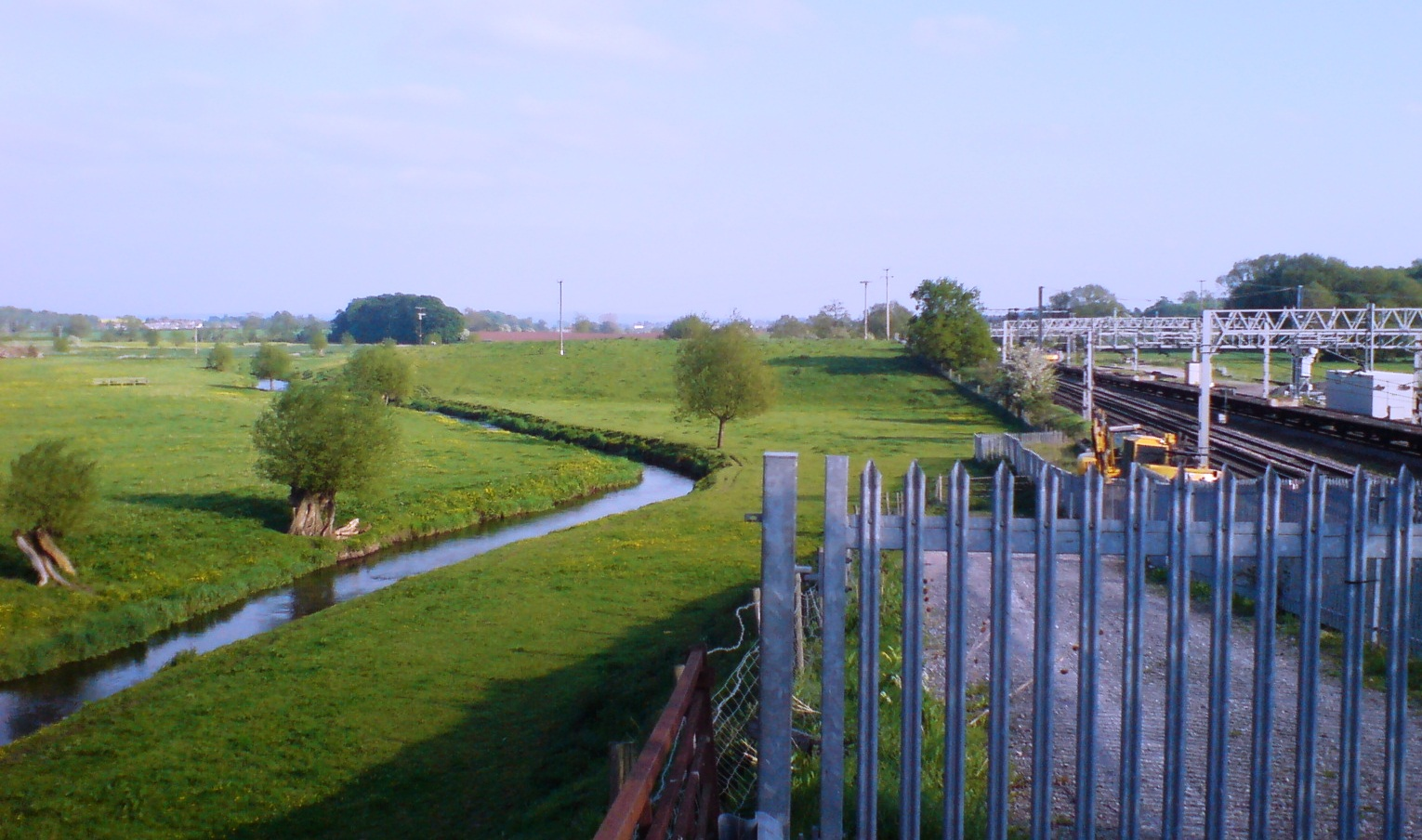
River Sow and railway at Great Bridgeford, looking south towards Stafford, May 2008

The village was served by two successive railway stations, the first from 1837 to 1840 and the second from 1876 until closing in 1959. The railway line at Great Bridgeford was the scene of a major accident and derailment on the evening of 6 June 1932. Four people died and many others were injured in this accident. A picture of the rail locomotive lying on its side in the aftermath of the accident can be seen here:

== See also ==
- Listed buildings in Seighford
