= Woodseaves =

Village in Staffordshire, England

Coordinates: 52.8266°N 2.3008°W

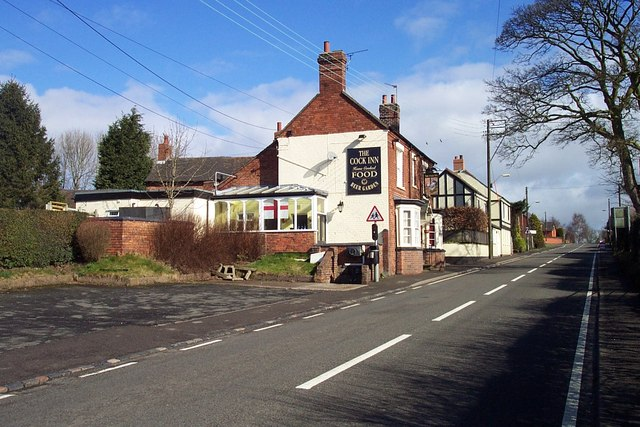
- The Cock Inn on the A519

- Location within Staffordshire
- OS grid reference: SJ799254
  - London: 150 miles (241 km)
- Civil parish: High Offley
- District: Stafford
- Shire county: Staffordshire
- Region: West Midlands
- Country: England
- Sovereign state: United Kingdom
- Post town: STAFFORD
- Postcode district: ST20
- Dialling code: 01785
- Police: Staffordshire
- Fire: Staffordshire
- Ambulance: West Midlands
- UK Parliament: Stafford

Woodseaves is a village in the civil parish of High Offley, in the Stafford district, in the county of Staffordshire, England.

It is situated on the A519 (Newport-Newcastle-under-Lyme) road and lies at the south-west end of the B5405 road, which leads to Great Bridgeford. Nearby are the villages of Gnosall and Norbury, the hamlets of Knightley and High Offley, and the small town of Eccleshall. The elevation of the village is between 125 metres (410 ft) and 140 metres (460 ft) above sea level. The centre of the village is the top of a small hill, relative to the adjacent countryside, and the roads into and out of the village are almost all sloping away from the village.

== Amenities and features ==
The chapel and crossroads at Woodseaves

The village contains a post office, a Methodist chapel, a village hall which is linked to a snooker club with two full size and well maintained snooker tables, and a primary school which had 83 pupils in 2007-8. The village hall is home to a number of evening events, such as "keep fit" classes, a craft club, an "over 55s" club, tai chi, and a fortnightly whist drive. The village is represented by one snooker and two billiards teams competing in the Stafford and District Billiards and Snooker League. A Sunday league football team also represent the village, playing their home games at Knighton Social Club.

The village has had three public houses — The Plough (now closed, converted to residential) and The Cock Inn, both of which are situated along the A519 road. A third, The Reform Tavern, which also lay on the main road, between the other two pubs, closed soon after the Millennium and is now a private residence.

The southern part of the village, on the A519, is known as Littleworth. Formerly a separate hamlet, it is now part of Woodseaves. The Plough is situated in Littleworth.

=== Canal ===
One kilometre southwest of the village is the Shropshire Union Canal. A deep cutting on the canal has the name of Woodseaves but this is not taken from the name of the village but from another Woodseaves, a hamlet about two miles to the south of Market Drayton in Shropshire. There are deep cuttings however near to Woodseaves (Staffordshire) at Loynton and Grub Street.

Underneath a nearby canal bridge, over which the A519 road passes, on the Newport side of Woodseaves, stands possibly the world's, and certainly Britain's smallest telegraph pole, its presence goes unnoticed by people crossing the bridge, but it is visible via the towpath that runs under the bridge on the south side of the canal.

== See also ==
- Listed buildings in High Offley
