= High Offley =

Village in Staffordshire, England

Coordinates: 52.8325°N 2.32231°W

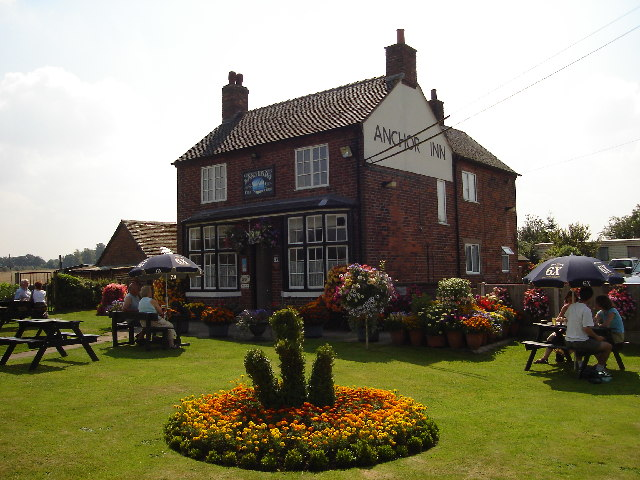
- The Anchor Inn by the canal

- Location within Staffordshire
- Population: 980 (2011)
- District: Stafford
- Shire county: Staffordshire
- Region: West Midlands
- Country: England
- Sovereign state: United Kingdom
- Post town: STAFFORD
- Postcode district: ST20
- Dialling code: 01785
- Police: Staffordshire
- Fire: Staffordshire
- Ambulance: West Midlands
- UK Parliament: Stone

High Offley is a small village and civil parish in Staffordshire, England. It lies 3 miles southwest of the town of Eccleshall and about 1 mile west of the village of Woodseaves, both on the A519. Woodseaves is the largest settlement in the parish, which also includes the hamlet of Shebdon to the WSW of High Offley, as well as a number of scattered houses and small farms (such as on Grub Street).

The Shropshire Union Canal runs through the parish, to the southwest of the villages of High Offley and Woodseaves, with the Shebdon aqueduct and wharf in the west of the parish, from Shebdon towards Knighton.

== Church ==
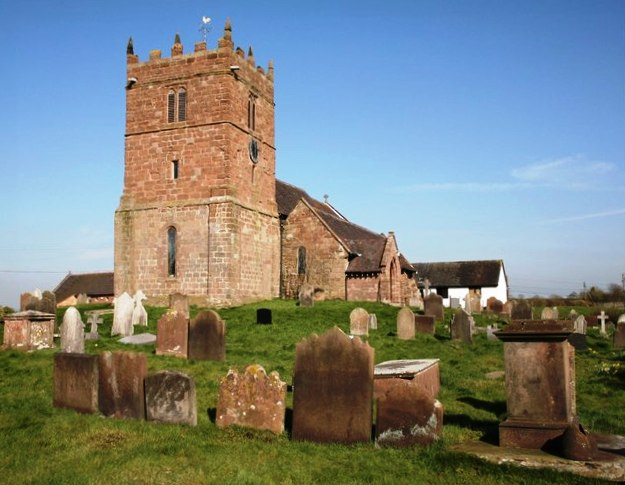
St Mary's Church

There is a church dedicated to St Mary: "High Offley Church, St Mary, is an ancient Gothic fabric, neatly pewed with oak. It has an excellent organ, which was given by John Salmon, Esq, of London, a native of this parish. It has several monuments of the Skrymsher and other families, and a handsome one was erected in 1851 in memory of the late Bishop Ryder, at the expense of the present vicar."

Pevsner dates most of the church to the 13th century with some earlier Norman features and some from later periods. The core of the church dates from the 12th century, and features from the 13th century are still present, including the lower stages of the tower and the south arcade. Most of the rest of the church is from the 15th and 16th centuries and is Perpendicular in style, including the nave, chancel, and upper part of the tower. There was a limited 19th-century restoration. which included the addition of a south porch. Inside the church, the nave roof is "an outstanding and well-preserved work of late-medieval carpentry", which includes bosses carved with heads and foliage.

== Historic public houses ==
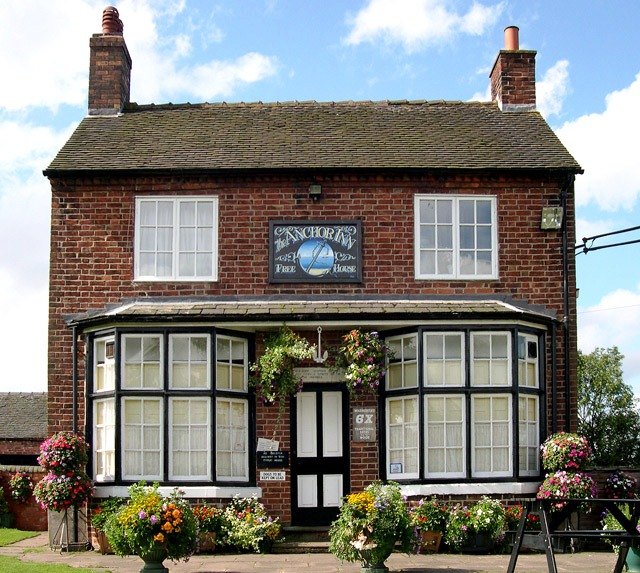
The front view of the Anchor Inn

High Offley once had a pub called the Royal Oak, which has now been converted into a private residence. In the parish, near to the village on Peggs Lane, and lying by the Shropshire Union Canal, is the Anchor Inn. It also gives its name to the adjacent bridge, which takes Peggs Lane over the canal.

Also within the parish is a pub in Woodseaves (the Cock Inn), where there were previously also two more pubs (the Tavern and Plough, the latter of which is currently closed, and the former was turned into a private residence in the late 1990s). There was previously one in the Shebdon area, also by the canal, called the Wharf Inn (now a private residence).

== In literature ==
In Douglas Adams's Meaning of Liff, a High Offley is defined as a "Goosnargh three weeks later".

== See also ==
- Listed buildings in High Offley
