= Knighton, Stafford =

Hamlet in Staffordshire, England

Coordinates: 52.838°N 2.376°W

Knighton
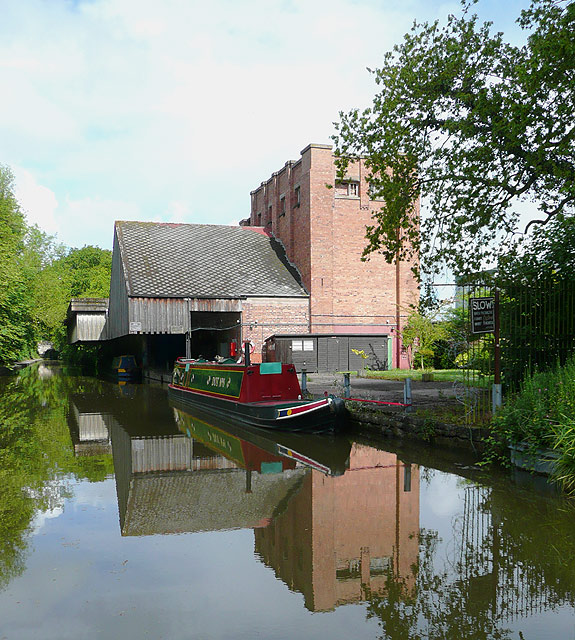
- The Cadbury Wharf in Knighton

- Location within Staffordshire
- Civil parish: Adbaston
- District: Stafford
- Shire county: Staffordshire
- Region: West Midlands
- Country: England
- Sovereign state: United Kingdom
- Post town: Stafford
- Postcode district: ST20
- Police: Staffordshire
- Fire: Staffordshire
- Ambulance: West Midlands
- UK Parliament: Stafford

Knighton is a hamlet in the parish of Adbaston in the county of Staffordshire, England.

Knighton is situated 5 miles (8 km) north of Newport, Shropshire, close to the Staffordshire/Shropshire border in undulating agricultural land featuring many endemic hardwood trees. Another feature is the Shropshire Union Canal, which passes through the hamlet at the point of a cutting and substantial embankment. Adjacent to the canal is the Knighton Reservoir, the function of which is to replenish its waters.

== Factory ==
Although a fundamentally agricultural community there is a food processing and packaging plant. Originally built in 1911 by Cadbury to produce chocolate crumb, which taken by canal to Bournville. The factory was sold by that company in 1961. It later belongsd to the food manufacturer Knighton Foods, processing and packing a wide range of products including hot beverages, instant desserts, custards and whips, bakery ingredients, instant milks, coffee creamers and fat powders. In 2024 it was bought by Excelsior Foods to produce baby formula.

The factory maintains a social club, the facilities of which are available to the wider community for social events. The club's football pitch is home ground to the amateur Sunday football team Woodseaves FC, from the nearby village of Woodseaves, who play in the Stafford and District Sunday League.

== Rates exemption ==
William Adams, who founded a grammar school at Newport, Shropshire in 1656, endowed this school with a large agricultural 900-acre (3.6 km^{2}) estate at Knighton, providing income for future generations.

The school estate was made extra-parochial by a private act of Parliament, Adams School, Newport Act 1660 (12 Cha. 2. c. 12 Pr.) which meant those occupying properties leased from the school did not have to pay tithes or rates. The exemption was taken advantage of by Cadburys in choosing the cite their chocolate crumb factory in Knighton. The introduction of the new system Community Charge and non-domestic rates in 1990 by the Local Government Finance Act 1988 led to the end of the exemption.

The Knighton estate was eventually sold off in several portions over the course of the 20th century, and the proceeds of the final sale were used by the Haberdashers' Company to purchase Longford Hall as a boarding house for the school.

== Nature ==
The immediate area has a wealth of fauna and flora, buzzards and ravens often to be seen in the skies, otters have been reported in the areas water courses, deer occasionally to be seen in the surrounding fields and at least one "big cat" has not only been spotted within the parish but has effected a "kill", the victim being a young lamb.

== See also ==
- Listed buildings in Adbaston
