= Church Eaton =

Village in Staffordshire, England

Coordinates: 52.7573°N 2.2217°W

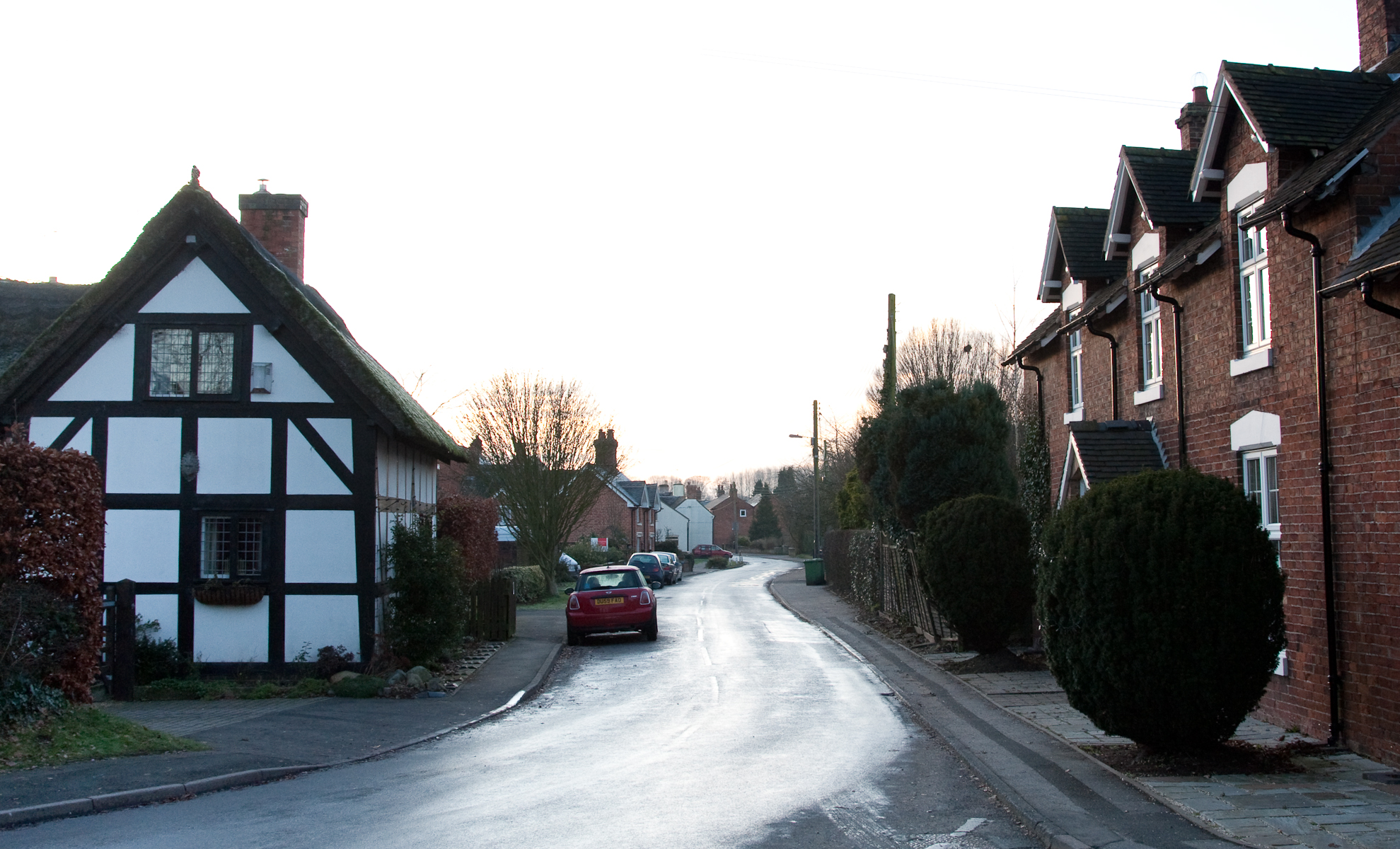
- Church Eaton

- Location within Staffordshire
- Population: 680 (2011)
- OS grid reference: SJ847175
- Civil parish: Church Eaton
- Shire county: Staffordshire
- Region: West Midlands
- Country: England
- Sovereign state: United Kingdom
- Post town: Stafford
- Postcode district: ST20
- Dialling code: 01785
- Police: Staffordshire
- Fire: Staffordshire
- Ambulance: West Midlands
- UK Parliament: Stafford
- Website: Church Eaton

Church Eaton is a village and civil parish in Staffordshire some 6 miles (10 km) southwest of Stafford, 6 miles (10 km) northwest of Penkridge and 4 miles (6 km) from the county boundary with Shropshire. It is in rolling dairy farming countryside. The hamlet of Wood Eaton is northwest of the village.

The civil parish also contains Marston to the south and since 1934 has included the hamlet of Apeton to the north.

== Parish church ==
The Church of England parish church of Saint Editha largely dates from the 12th century. It has a square west tower with a spire, a large 7-light east window of fine stained glass by C.E. Kempe depicting scenes from the life of Christ, and "the broken and repaired remains of an elaborate early 12th century font, closely related to the font at Bradley," and that at Lilleshall, except that the font at Bradley is in much better condition. Nikolaus Pevsner states that these fonts were all made at Gnosall.

== Amenities ==
Church Eaton has a public house, The Royal Oak.

There is also a village institute,

Church Eaton also has a cricket club, which is part of the North Staffordshire south Cheshire Cricket Leagues and run a many number of junior & senior teams for all genders.

Church Eaton also has a tennis club.

The community also has a Church Eaton Activities Diary of public events.

== See also ==
- Listed buildings in Church Eaton
