= Norbury, Staffordshire =

Village in Staffordshire, England

Coordinates: 52.808°N 2.321°W

Norbury
- Location within Staffordshire
- Population: 371 (2011 Census)
- District: Stafford
- Shire county: Staffordshire
- Region: West Midlands
- Country: England
- Sovereign state: United Kingdom
- Post town: Stafford
- Postcode district: ST20
- Police: Staffordshire
- Fire: Staffordshire
- Ambulance: West Midlands
- UK Parliament: Stone

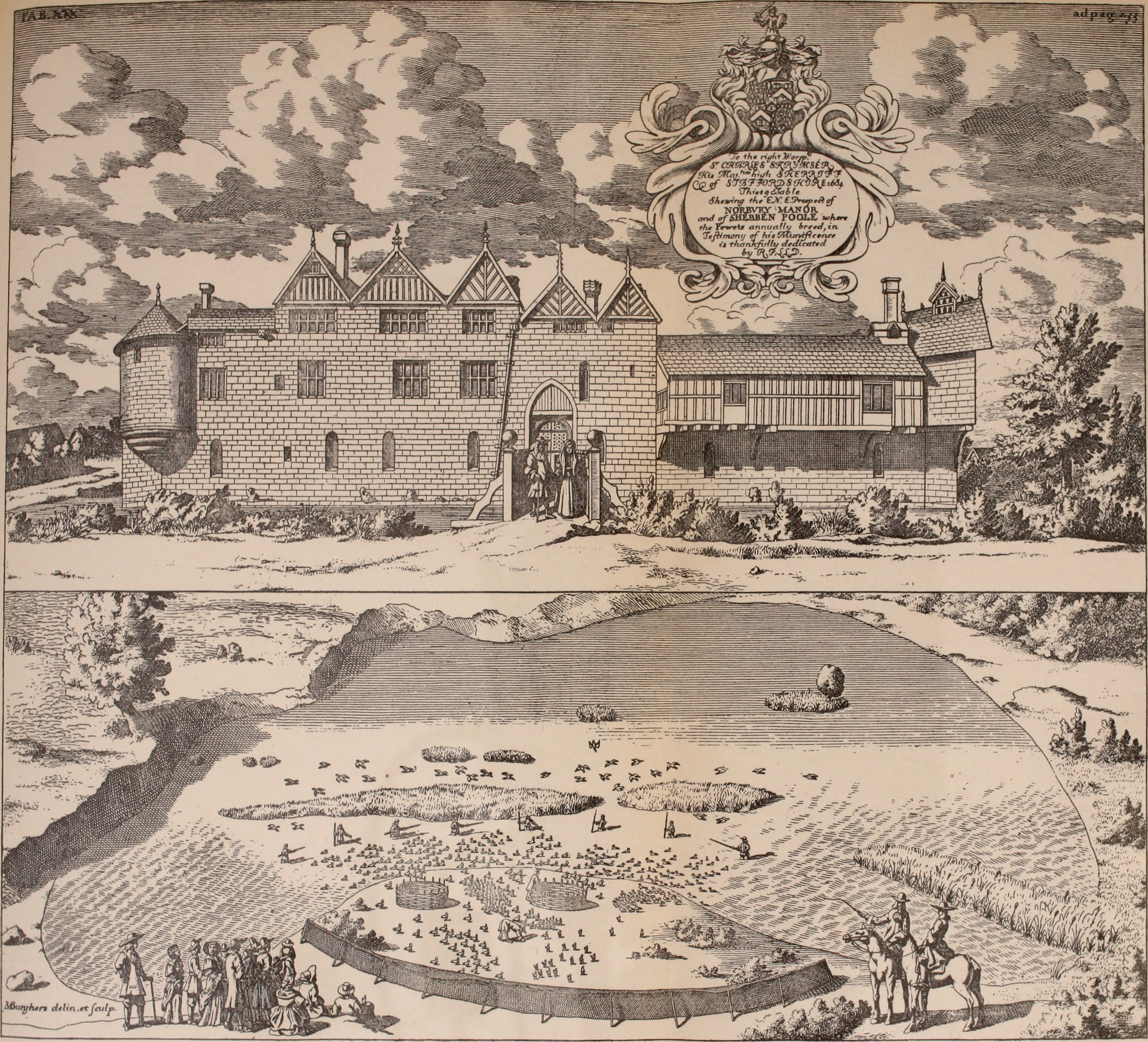
Norbury Manor, and Pewet (Plover) hunting at Shebben Poole, circa. 1682 - 1709

Norbury is a village and civil parish in the Borough of Stafford, in west Staffordshire, England. The population as taken at the 2011 census was 371.

It is situated close to the Shropshire border, approximately 4 miles (6.4 km) north-east of Newport, just south of the A519 Newport to Newcastle-under-Lyme road, and two miles south-east of Woodseaves.

== Canal ==
The village gave its name to Norbury Junction, about one mile to the south-east. At one time (1835), this was a junction between the main Birmingham and Liverpool Junction Canal (later to become part of the Shropshire Union Canal) and a branch stretching south-west through Newport to link to the now-abandoned Shrewsbury Canal.

== Church ==
The body of the Parish Church of St Peter is constructed in sandstone, dates from the 14th century, and is mainly in Decorated style. There is a canonical sundial on the south wall. The tower, built in 1759, is in brick, and in Georgian style. The church was restored in 1826–29, when the north vestry and west gallery were added. Inside the church are well-preserved medieval roofs, and a tomb recess containing an effigy dating from the 14th century.

== Notable people ==
- Roger Northburgh (probably born in Norbury – died 1358) a cleric, administrator and politician who was Bishop of Coventry and Lichfield from 1321 until his death.
- Richard Barnfield (1574 in Norbury – 1620) an English poet with an obscure though close relationship with William Shakespeare.
- William Lloyd, Archdeacon of Durban (1802–1881) was an Anglican clergyman, brought up in Shugborough Hall; was rector of Norbury

== See also ==
- Listed buildings at Norbury, Staffordshire
