= Norbury Junction =

Hamlet and canal junction in Staffordshire, England

Coordinates: 52.8023°N 2.3073°W

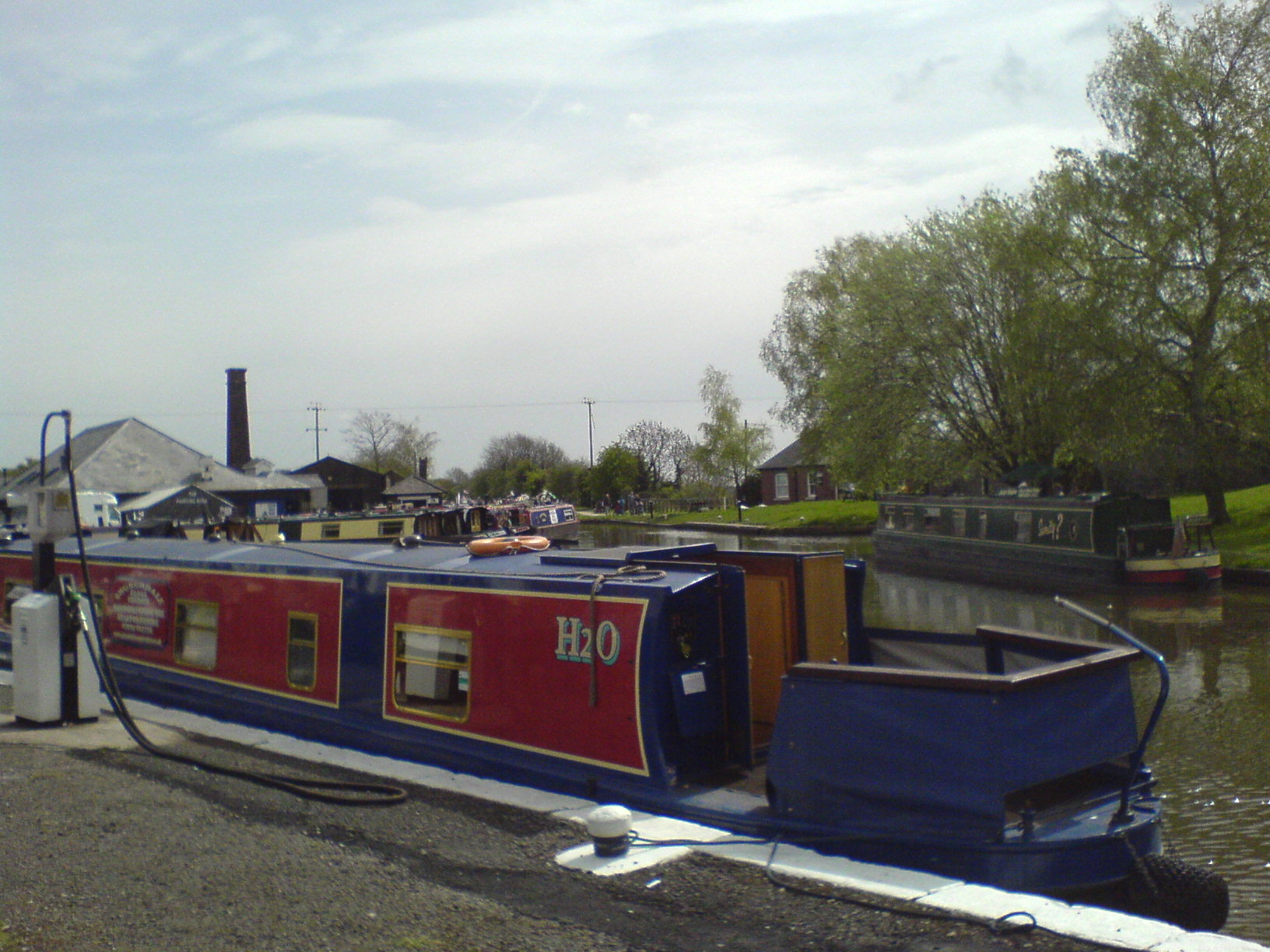
- Norbury Junction in 2008
- Interactive map of Norbury Junction

Specifications
- Status: No longer a junction
- Navigation authority: Canal & River Trust

History
- Date completed: 1835
- Date closed: 1944

Norbury Junction (grid reference SJ793228) is a hamlet and former canal junction which lies about 1 mile (1.6 km) to the south east of Norbury, in Staffordshire, England. The junction is where the Shrewsbury Canal meets the main line of the Shropshire Union Canal. Both canals opened in 1835 but the Shrewsbury Canal closed in 1944. The main line still runs through the former junction.

== History ==
The Birmingham and Liverpool Junction Canal was authorised by an act of Parliament in 1825, to create a link between the southern end of the Ellesmere and Chester Canal at Nantwich and the Staffordshire and Worcestershire Canal at Autherley Junction. Thomas Telford was the engineer, and the canal was one of a new generation of canals which used cuttings and embankments to follow a relatively straight line across the countryside, unlike earlier canals which often followed tortuous paths as they followed the contours. Norbury was a little over halfway towards Autherley, and to the north, the canal passed through the deep Grub Street cutting. To the south, Telford's preferred route could not be followed, as Lord Anson objected to it passing through parts of his estate. The only option was a massive embankment, which starts just below the site of the junction, and is punctured by two road tunnels. Shelmore embankment proved difficult to engineer, as the marl soil used to build it kept slipping. It was the last part of the canal to be completed, as it took five and a half years to build, and was not finished until January 1835, six months after Telford had died.

The Shrewsbury Canal was authorised in 1793, and connected Shrewsbury to the Wombridge Canal at Trench, passing through Wappenshall and up an inclined plane to reach Trench. It was part of a small network of canals in East Shropshire, which were isolated from the main canal network of the time. A meeting was held between the Birmingham and Liverpool Junction Canal and the Shrewsbury Canal in 1827, at which the idea of a link was formulated, but the engineering problems on the main line meant that no progress was made until 1831. The link from Wappenshall Junction to Newport was opened in January 1835, and the final section, which included a flight of seventeen locks up to Norbury Junction, opened in March, along with the main line. It became part of the Shropshire Union network in 1846, after the Ellesmere and Chester company merged with the Birmingham and Liverpool Junction company, and took over most of the East Shropshire network.

The junction continued in operation until 1944, when the Shrewsbury Canal, along with much of the Shropshire Union network, was abandoned as a result of an Act of Abandonment obtained by the London, Midland and Scottish Railway, which had owned the canals since 1922.

== Location ==
The small settlement by the junction is named after the canal junction. The first lock on the Newport Branch has been turned into a dry-dock. There is a pub, the Junction Inn, a boatyard with full facilities for boaters, including the Old Wharf Tearoom, and a Canal & River Trust maintenance depot.

The junction site is in the middle of a long, level pound. To the north, the pound stretches for 9.9 miles (15.9 km) to Tyrley Top Lock, the first of 25, arranged as two flights of five and a flight of fifteen, which descend to Nantwich, while to the south it is 7.7 miles (12.4 km) to Wheaton Aston lock, which raises the canal level a little and is the only lock before the stop lock at the junction at Atherley. A very short section of the Shrewsbury Canal remains, up to the dry dock, which is used as private moorings by the boatyard.

== Norbury Canal Festival ==
Since 2004, the Shrewsbury & Newport Canals Trust has worked with the Norbury village community and the Junction Inn to jointly organise the May Bank Holiday Canal Festival. During the festival, there is a gathering of boat traders, modern narrowboats and restored working boats, and people visiting have the opportunity to look inside some of the boats to see what life is like on board.

The festival includes stalls, refreshments and boat trips along the canal. The volunteer-run Windmill Broadcasting has been at the event, along with a fairground and other attractions.

== See also ==
- Canals of the United Kingdom
- History of the British canal system

== Bibliography ==
- Cumberlidge, Jane (2009). Inland Waterways of Great Britain (8th Ed.). Imray Laurie Norie and Wilson. ISBN 978-1-84623-010-3.
- Hadfield, Charles (1985). The Canals of the West Midlands. David and Charles. ISBN 0-7153-8644-1.
- Nicholson (2006). Nicholson Guide Vol 4 - Four Counties & the Welsh Canals. Harper Collins. ISBN 978-0-00-721112-8.
