= Grade I listed buildings in Staffordshire =

Staffordshire shown within England

There are over 9000 Grade I listed buildings in England. This page is a list of these buildings in the county of Staffordshire, by district.

== City of Stoke-on-Trent ==
Name	Location	Type	Completed (Note: The date given is the date used by Historic England as significant for the initial building or that of an important part in the structure's description.)	Date designated	Grid ref. (Note: Sometimes known as OSGB36, the grid reference is based on the British national grid reference system used by the Ordnance Survey.) Geo-coordinates	Entry number (Note: The "List Entry Number" is a unique number assigned to each listed building and scheduled monument by Historic England.)	Image
Trentham Mausoleum	Trentham	Mausoleum	c. 1808	19 April 1972	SJ8680441062; 52°58′00″N 2°11′53″W	1210451	Trentham Mausoleum More images

== East Staffordshire ==
Name	Location	Type	Completed	Date designated	Grid ref. Geo-coordinates	Entry number	Image
Blithfield Hall	Blithfield Park, Blithfield	Country House	16th century	10 January 1953	SK0449823934; 52°48′47″N 1°56′05″W	1190006	Blithfield Hall More images
Church of St Leonard	Blithfield	Parish Church	c. 1300	12 January 1966	SK0441623991; 52°48′48″N 1°56′09″W	1294024	Church of St Leonard More images
Church of St Modwen	Burton upon Trent	Parish Church	1719-26	24 March 1950	SK2509922715; 52°48′05″N 1°37′45″W	1214046	Church of St Modwen More images
Croxden Abbey	Croxden	Abbey	1179–1280	12 January 1966	SK0658339695; 52°57′17″N 1°54′12″W	1230576	Croxden Abbey More images
Church of the Holy Angels	Hoar Cross	Church	1872-78	12 March 1964	SK1248723046; 52°48′17″N 1°48′58″W	1038507	Church of the Holy Angels More images
Church of St Chad	Burton upon Trent	Church	1903	22 June 1979	SK2461424458; 52°49′02″N 1°38′10″W	1038702	Church of St Chad More images
Church of St John the Baptist	Mayfield	Parish Church	Late 12th century	12 January 1966	SK1542844752; 53°00′00″N 1°46′18″W	1230760	Church of St John the Baptist More images
Wootton Lodge	Wootton Park, Ramshorn	Country House	c. 1600	10 January 1953	SK0956343800; 52°59′29″N 1°51′32″W	1278308	Wootton Lodge More images
Church of St Mary	Rolleston on Dove	Parish Church	12th century	12 March 1964	SK2356427718; 52°50′47″N 1°39′06″W	1374442	Church of St Mary More images
Church of St Mary	Tutbury	Parish Church	1160-70	12 March 1964	SK2111829107; 52°51′33″N 1°41′16″W	1038524	Church of St Mary More images
Tutbury Castle	Tutbury	Castle	12th century	26 April 1984	SK2092429117; 52°51′33″N 1°41′26″W	1374431	Tutbury Castle More images

== Lichfield District ==
Name	Location	Type	Completed	Date designated	Grid ref. Geo-coordinates	Entry number	Image
Church of All Saints	Alrewas	Parish Church	13th century	20 November 1986	SK1676915267; 52°44′05″N 1°45′11″W	1038926	Church of All Saints More images
Church of St Andrew	Clifton Campville	Parish Church	Early 13th century	27 February 1964	SK2529010784; 52°41′39″N 1°37′38″W	1038808	Church of St Andrew More images
Church of St Michael and All Angels	Hamstall Ridware	Parish Church	12th century	27 February 1964	SK1056519346; 52°46′18″N 1°50′41″W	1190715	Church of St Michael and All Angels More images
Church of All Saints	Kings Bromley	Parish Church	16th century	27 February 1964	SK1220817025; 52°45′03″N 1°49′14″W	1277769	Church of All Saints More images
Cathedral Church of the Blessed Virgin Mary and St Chad	Lichfield	Cathedral	19th century	5 February 1952	SK1156309742; 52°41′07″N 1°49′49″W	1298431	Cathedral Church of the Blessed Virgin Mary and St Chad More images
Erasmus Darwin House	Lichfield	House	c. 1758	5 February 1952	SK1141209709; 52°41′06″N 1°49′57″W	1187355	Erasmus Darwin House More images
Hospital of St John Baptist without the Barrs	Lichfield	Almshouse and chapel	19th century	5 February 1952	SK1175409131; 52°40′47″N 1°49′39″W	1218231	Hospital of St John Baptist without the Barrs More images
Samuel Johnson Birthplace Museum	Lichfield	Timber Framed House	c. 1707	5 February 1952	SK1173009542; 52°41′00″N 1°49′41″W	1292492	Samuel Johnson Birthplace Museum More images
Master's House to rear of Hospital of St John Baptist without the Barrs	Lichfield	Teachers House	cira 1495	5 February 1952	SK1172909178; 52°40′49″N 1°49′41″W	1298403	Master's House to rear of Hospital of St John Baptist without the Barrs More images
St Chad's Cathedral School and Chapel	Lichfield	Bishops Palace	1687-8	5 February 1952	SK1156009830; 52°41′10″N 1°49′50″W	1218871	St Chad's Cathedral School and Chapel More images
Church of St Nicholas	Mavesyn Ridware	Parish Church	13th century	27 February 1964	SK0816216871; 52°44′58″N 1°52′50″W	1249035	Church of St Nicholas More images
Gatehouse at Old Hall	Mavesyn Ridware	Gatehouse	14th century	27 February 1964	SK0812916781; 52°44′55″N 1°52′52″W	1249047	Gatehouse at Old Hall More images

== Newcastle-under-Lyme ==
Name	Location	Type	Completed	Date designated	Grid ref. Geo-coordinates	Entry number	Image
Church of St Margaret	Betley	Parish Church	17th century	17 November 1966	SJ7556348459; 53°01′58″N 2°21′57″W	1038581	Church of St Margaret More images
Church of All Saints	Madeley	Parish Church	12th century	17 November 1966	SJ7730144377; 52°59′46″N 2°20′23″W	1206195	Church of All Saints More images
Whitmore Hall	Whitmore	House	Late 19th century	2 December 1952	SJ8109041266; 52°58′06″N 2°16′59″W	1206579	Whitmore Hall More images

== South Staffordshire ==
Name	Location	Type	Completed	Date designated	Grid ref. Geo-coordinates	Entry number	Image
Weston Park and service wings to north and east	Weston Park, Weston-under-Lizard	Country House	17th century	16 May 1953	SJ8064010629; 52°41′35″N 2°17′16″W	1039264	Weston Park and service wings to north and east More images
Bridge at Weston Park	Weston Park, Weston-under-Lizard	Bridge	1760s	16 May 1953	SJ8131810383; 52°41′27″N 2°16′40″W	1039268	Bridge at Weston Park More images
Temple of Diana at Weston Park	Weston Park, Weston-under-Lizard	Garden House	c. 1760	16 May 1953	SJ8104310441; 52°41′29″N 2°16′55″W	1188135	Temple of Diana at Weston Park More images
St Andrew's Church, Weston-under-Lizard	Weston-under-Lizard	Church	c. 1701	19 March 1962	SJ8061210649; 52°41′35″N 2°17′18″W	1294950	St Andrew's Church, Weston-under-Lizard More images
St Mary's Church, Blymhill	Blymhill	Tower	Early 15th century	19 March 1962	SJ8085112234; 52°42′27″N 2°17′05″W	1039272	St Mary's Church, Blymhill More images
Chillington Hall	Chillington Park, Brewood	Country House	1724	16 May 1953	SJ8636606776; 52°39′31″N 2°12′11″W	1060191	Chillington Hall More images
Church of St Mary and St Chad	Brewood	Parish Church	13th century	19 March 1962	SJ8834908664; 52°40′32″N 2°10′26″W	1060197	Church of St Mary and St Chad More images
The Grecian Temple at Chillington Hall	Chillington Park, Brewood	Garden Temple	Late 18th century	16 May 1953	SJ8540205371; 52°38′45″N 2°13′02″W	1295261	The Grecian Temple at Chillington Hall More images
Hilton Hall	Hilton Park, Hilton	Country House	1720-30	16 May 1953	SJ9521005184; 52°38′40″N 2°04′20″W	1039174	Hilton Hall More images
The Conservatory at Hilton Hall	Hilton Park, Hilton	Conservatory	Early 19th century	16 May 1953	SJ9513005274; 52°38′43″N 2°04′24″W	1039176	Upload Photo
Church of St Peter	Kinver	Church	14th century	27 June 1963	SO8461483049; 52°26′43″N 2°13′40″W	1230950	Church of St Peter More images
Church of All Saints	Lapley	Parish Church	12th century	19 March 1962	SJ8724012934; 52°42′50″N 2°11′25″W	1374057	Church of All Saints More images
Patshull Hall and north west and north east wings to north forecourt	Patshull Park, Pattingham	Country House	18th century	16 June 1953	SJ8024600931; 52°36′21″N 2°17′35″W	1039327	Patshull Hall and north west and north east wings to north forecourt More images
Triumphal entry to forecourt of Patshull Hall and flanking screen walls	Patshull Park, Pattingham	Gatehouse	c. 1750	16 June 1953	SJ8022600953; 52°36′22″N 2°17′36″W	1294872	Triumphal entry to forecourt of Patshull Hall and flanking screen walls
Church of St Michael and All Angels	Penkridge	Collegiate Church	13th century	19 March 1962	SJ9214414160; 52°43′30″N 2°07′04″W	1039195	Church of St Michael and All Angels More images

== Stafford Borough ==
Name	Location	Type	Completed	Date designated	Grid ref. Geo-coordinates	Entry number	Image
Barlaston Hall	Barlaston	Country House	1756-8	10 January 1953	SJ8944239114; 52°56′57″N 2°09′31″W	1374172	Barlaston Hall More images
Church of St Mary and All Saints	Bradley	Church	Late 13th/early 14th century	15 January 1968	SJ8795618050; 52°45′36″N 2°10′48″W	1319799	Church of St Mary and All Saints More images
Church of All Saints	Chebsey	Church	13th century	24 January 1967	SJ8596828586; 52°51′16″N 2°12′35″W	1374173	Church of All Saints More images
Shugborough Hall	Colwich	Country House	c. 1695	17 March 1953	SJ9922422493; 52°48′00″N 2°00′47″W	1079637	Shugborough Hall More images
Chinese House at Shugborough Hall	Colwich	Garden Building	c. 1747	17 March 1953	SJ9924922718; 52°48′07″N 2°00′45″W	1358640	Chinese House at Shugborough Hall More images
Dark Lantern at Shugborough Hall	Colwich	Garden Feature	c. 1765	17 March 1953	SJ9848321938; 52°47′42″N 2°01′26″W	1065771	Dark Lantern at Shugborough Hall More images
Doric Temple at Shugborough Hall to north of the house	Colwich	Garden Temple	c. 1760	15 January 1968	SJ9925322579; 52°48′03″N 2°00′45″W	1079641	Doric Temple at Shugborough Hall to north of the house More images
Garden Bridge at Shugborough Hall	Colwich	Ornamental Bridge	Late 18th century	17 March 1953	SJ9926122705; 52°48′07″N 2°00′45″W	1079642	Garden Bridge at Shugborough Hall More images
Triumphal Arch at Shugborough Hall	Colwich	Triumphal Arch	c. 1765	17 March 1953	SJ9866021589; 52°47′31″N 2°01′17″W	1039140	Triumphal Arch at Shugborough Hall More images
Essex Bridge	Colwich	Bridge	16th century	10 January 1972	SJ9951722564; 52°48′02″N 2°00′31″W	1079635	Essex Bridge More images
Broughton Hall	Eccleshall	Country House	1637	10 January 1953	SJ7667333886; 52°54′07″N 2°20′54″W	1189282	Broughton Hall More images
Church of St Peter	Broughton, Eccleshall	Church	17th century	24 January 1967	SJ7661233717; 52°54′01″N 2°20′57″W	1039045	Church of St Peter More images
Church of the Holy Trinity	Eccleshall	Church	13th century	24 January 1967	SJ8275829179; 52°51′35″N 2°15′27″W	1180335	Church of the Holy Trinity More images
Church of St Lawrence	Gnosall	Church	13th century	15 January 1968	SJ8301520889; 52°47′07″N 2°15′12″W	1242645	Church of St Lawrence More images
St Mary's Church	High Offley	Parish Church	12th century	15 January 1968	SJ7835126161; 52°49′57″N 2°19′22″W	1242831	St Mary's Church More images
Church of St Mary	Ingestre	Church	1676	15 January 1968	SJ9766824692; 52°49′11″N 2°02′10″W	1259814	Church of St Mary More images
Church of St Peter	Norbury	Church	18th century	15 January 1968	SJ7863323473; 52°48′30″N 2°19′06″W	1242976	Church of St Peter More images
Church of All Saints	Sandon	Church	Late 12th or early 13th century	24 January 1967	SJ9540929489; 52°51′46″N 2°04′11″W	1294163	Church of All Saints More images
Church of All Saints	Standon	Church	14th century	24 January 1967	SJ8194934975; 52°54′43″N 2°16′12″W	1039004	Church of All Saints More images
Church of St Mary	Swynnerton	Church	13th century	24 January 1967	SJ8522935503; 52°55′00″N 2°13′16″W	1374205	Church of St Mary More images
Swynnerton Hall	Swynnerton	House	c. 1725	10 January 1953	SJ8521235444; 52°54′58″N 2°13′17″W	1038991	Swynnerton Hall More images
Tixall Gatehouse	Tixall	Gatehouse	c. 1575	15 January 1968	SJ9791122948; 52°48′15″N 2°01′57″W	1258142	Tixall Gatehouse More images
Church of St Mary	Stafford	Church	Early 13th century	16 January 1951	SJ9213423190; 52°48′22″N 2°07′05″W	1195365	Church of St Mary More images

== Staffordshire Moorlands ==
Name	Location	Type	Completed	Date designated	Grid ref. Geo-coordinates	Entry number	Image
Church of St Peter	Alstonefield	Cross	12th century	1 February 1967	SK1328055347; 53°05′43″N 1°48′11″W	1038158	Church of St Peter More images
Alton Castle	Alton	Castle	Late 12th century	3 January 1967	SK0725342455; 52°58′46″N 1°53′36″W	1374687	Alton Castle More images
Church of St Bartholomew	Blore	Parish Church	13th century	3 January 1967	SK1373949324; 53°02′28″N 1°47′48″W	1191405	Church of St Bartholomew More images
Caverswall Castle, screen walls, gatehouse and bridge	Caverswall	Castle	1615	2 May 1953	SJ9508342808; 52°58′57″N 2°04′29″W	1038000	Caverswall Castle, screen walls, gatehouse and bridge More images
St. Giles' Catholic Church, Cheadle	Cheadle	Roman Catholic Church	1841-6	3 January 1967	SK0083643189; 52°59′10″N 1°59′20″W	1038008	St. Giles' Catholic Church, Cheadle More images
St Mary's and All Saints' Church	Checkley	Parish Church	12th century	3 January 1967	SK0279837889; 52°56′18″N 1°57′35″W	1037959	St Mary's and All Saints' Church More images
Church of the Holy Cross	Ilam Park, Ilam	Parish Church	11th century	1 February 1967	SK1326950697; 53°03′12″N 1°48′13″W	1038155	Church of the Holy Cross More images
Cross shaft approximately 15 yards south of south porch of Church of the Holy Cross	Ilam Park, Ilam	Cross	10th century	1 February 1967	SK1326250676; 53°03′11″N 1°48′13″W	1038113	Cross shaft approximately 15 yards south of south porch of Church of the Holy Cross More images
Cross shaft approximately 7 yards south of St Bertrams Chapel, Church of the Holy Cross	Ilam Park, Ilam	Cross	10th century	1 February 1967	SK1327550681; 53°03′12″N 1°48′12″W	1188671	Cross shaft approximately 7 yards south of St Bertrams Chapel, Church of the Holy Cross More images
Parish Church of All Saints	Leek	Parish Church	1887	13 April 1951	SJ9849956125; 53°06′08″N 2°01′26″W	1268538	Parish Church of All Saints More images

== Tamworth ==
Name	Location	Type	Completed	Date designated	Grid ref. Geo-coordinates	Entry number	Image
Causeway walls to north east of Tamworth Castle	Tamworth	Wall	Late 11th century	11 May 1950	SK2066703928; 52°37′58″N 1°41′46″W	1297334	Causeway walls to north east of Tamworth Castle
Church of St Editha	Tamworth	Church	Late 14th century	11 May 1950	SK2078404090; 52°38′03″N 1°41′40″W	1207856	Church of St Editha More images
Tamworth Castle	Tamworth	Castle	Late 11th century	11 May 1950	SK2061303913; 52°37′57″N 1°41′49″W	1197020	Tamworth Castle More images
