= Erasmus Darwin (disambiguation) =

Erasmus Darwin (1731–1802) was a physician and poet and grandfather of Charles Darwin

Erasmus Darwin may also refer to:

- Erasmus Alvey Darwin (1804–1881), grandson of Erasmus Darwin, brother of Charles Darwin
- Erasmus Darwin IV (1881–1915), son of Horace Darwin, grandson of Charles Darwin

== See also ==
- Erasmus Darwin House, house of Erasmus Darwin in Lichfield
- Erasmus Darwin Barlow (1915–2005), great-great-great-grandson of Erasmus Darwin
- Erasmus Darwin Keyes (1810–1895), apparently unrelated
