= Essex Bridge =

Essex Bridge may refer to:

- Essex Bridge, Staffordshire
- Essex Bridge (now Grattan Bridge), Dublin, Ireland
