= Listed buildings in Colwich, Staffordshire =

Colwich is a civil parish in the Borough of Stafford, Staffordshire, England. It contains 73 listed buildings that are recorded in the National Heritage List for England. Of these, seven are listed at Grade I, the highest of the three grades, ten are at Grade II*, the middle grade, and the others are at Grade II, the lowest grade. The parish includes the villages of Colwich, Great Haywood, and Little Haywood, and the surrounding area. The most important building in the parish is Shugborough Hall, a large country house, which is listed together with associated structures and buildings in the grounds. The Trent and Mersey Canal passes through the parish, and joins the Staffordshire and Worcestershire Canal at Haywood Junction, and buildings associated with these canals include bridges, locks, mileposts, and a canal cottage and privy. The other listed buildings include churches, houses and associated structures, farmhouses, farm buildings, a public house, road and railway bridges, and a school.

== Key ==
Grade	Criteria
I	Buildings of exceptional interest, sometimes considered to be internationally important
II*	Particularly important buildings of more than special interest
II	Buildings of national importance and special interest

== Buildings ==
Name and location	Photograph	Date	Notes	Grade
St Michael's Church; 52.78776°N 1.98536°W		Late 13th century	The tower is dated 1640, and most of the church results from an enlargement and alterations completed in 1856. The church consists of a nave with a clerestory, north and south aisles, a south porch, a vestry, a north chapel, and a tower occupying the west bay of the north aisle. The tower has a clock face on the north side, an embattled parapet, and corner pinnacles. The south aisle also has an embattled parapet, and the east window has five lights.	II*
Barn northeast of Abbey House; 52.80346°N 2.00387°W	—	16th century (probable)	The barn is partly timber framed and partly in stone, and has a tile roof. On the north side are buttresses, and in the gable end are pigeon holes and ledges.	II
Essex Bridge; 52.80070°N 2.00851°W		16th century (probable)	The bridge carries a bridleway over the River Trent. It is in stone, and consists of 14 round-headed arches. There are cutwaters on both sides, the piers rising to form refuges. Between the parapets with bridge is 4 feet (1.2 m) wide. The bridge is also a scheduled monument.	I
Abbey House, Great Haywood; 52.80327°N 2.00397°W	—	17th century	The house has been much altered and extended. It is in stone and brick with tile roofs. There are two storeys and an irregular plan. The windows are casements with stone mullions, on the front are two bay windows and a gabled porch.	II
Former Gibson's Shop; 52.78744°N 1.98202°W	—	17th century	A timber framed house with a tile roof, one storey and an attic, and two bays. The windows are casements, and there are two gabled dormers.	II
Barn south east of Wolseley Arms; 52.77977°N 1.97017°W		17th century	The barn was restored and resited to its present position in about 1986. It is timber framed with brick infill on a stone plinth, and has a tile roof. There are three bays, it contains double doors, and there is a lean-to in stone and brick on the west side.	II
Former Wolseley Bridge Tea Rooms; 52.77955°N 1.96951°W	—	17th century	The building is in two parts, the right part added later, both parts in brick with tile roofs. The early part is in painted roughcast with two storeys and three bays. In the ground floor is a doorway with a pediment, two sash windows to the left, and a shop window to the right, and in the upper floor are casement windows. Internally there are the remains of timber framing and an inglenook fireplace. The right part has one storey, three bays, and three doorways in the right gable end.	II
Shugborough Hall; 52.80003°N 2.01290°W		1693	A large country house, the oldest part being the main block. The wings and links were added in about 1748, between 1760 and 1770 the house was remodelled by "Athenian" Stuart, the giant portico was added to the front in 1794 by Samuel Wyatt, who in 1803–06 added the rooms protruding at the rear. The house consists of a central three-storey block, with two-storey flanking three-bay wings, the middle bays bowed and domed. In front of the house is the portico, which has eight columns in wood faced with slate, and capitals in Coade stone. On the south front is another bowed bay.	I
The Yeld, Little Haywood; 52.79172°N 1.99437°W	—	Early to mid 18th century	The house, which was altered in the 19th century, is in rendered brick on a stone plinth and has a tile roof. There are two storeys and attics, and an L-shaped plan, with a projecting cross-wing on the left. On the front is a porch with free-standing Doric columns and an entablature, and a canted bay window. Most of the other windows are sashes and there is a half-dormer with a casement window.	II
Chinese House, Shugborough Hall; 52.80208°N 2.01257°W		1747	The building has plastered walls, bold eaves, and a pyramidal leaded roof. There is one storey and a rectangular plan. The windows have elaborate glazing, and inside is Chinoiserie woodwork.	I
Ruin, Shugborough Hall; 52.80055°N 2.01414°W		c. 1748	The ruin is a feature to the west of the garden. It is in stone, and consists of fragments of buildings from during, before and after the Tudor era combined to act as an eyecatcher.	II
Bishton Hall; 52.78390°N 1.96589°W		Mid 18th century	A country house, which was extended in the 19th century and later used for other purposes. It is in Georgian style, is rendered with stone dressings, and the extensions are in stone. There are quoins, string courses, moulded stone copings, blocking courses, and hipped roofs in tile and slate. The main block has three storeys and a front of seven bays, the middle three bays projecting forward under a pediment containing a festooned cartouche. In the centre is a tetrastyle Tuscan portico, and the windows are sashes in architraves. Flanking the main block are three-bay wings with bowed fronts. There are further wings to the sides and rear, including a block with a tower, and a long seven-bay extension on the left.	II*
Orangery, Bishton Hall; 52.78433°N 1.96622°W	—	Mid 18th century	The orangery is in stone with a moulded cornice and a glazed hipped roof. There is one storey, a rectangular plan, and six bays, with panelled piers between full-height sash windows. To the right is a summer house with a tetrastyle portico in antis.	II
Stables and coach houses, Bishton Hall; 52.78392°N 1.96649°W	—	Mid 18th century	The stables and coach houses have been converted for other uses. They are in red brick on a stone plinth with tile roofs. There is one storey and an attic, and an L-shaped plan with two ranges. The ranges contain a carriageway with an elliptical head, windows, doorways, coach house doors, and dormers.	II
Fountain, Shugborough Hall; 52.80039°N 2.01402°W		18th century	The fountain is in the centre of an ornamental pool in the garden of the hall. It consists of a rounded stone pedestal on which is the statue of a boy and a swan in lead.	II
St Mary's Abbey and walls 52.78996°N 1.98944°W	—	Mid 18th century	Originally a house which, since the early 19th century, has been altered and expanded into buildings for religious use. It is mainly in stone, with parts in brick and parts rendered, and with slate roofs. The main building is in Gothick style, and on the front are two turrets with a gabled section between. At the rear are various buildings arranged around a courtyard, and the grounds are enclosed by tall brick walls.	II
Doric Temple, Shugborough Hall; 52.80083°N 2.01251°W		c. 1760	The building was designed by "Athenian" Stuart in Greek Revival style, and is built in stone and plastered brick. At the front is a portico of six fluted Doric columns carrying a triglyph frieze and a pediment. Behind the portico the temple has an open front.	I
Triumphal Arch, Shugborough Hall; 52.79192°N 2.02124°W		1761–62	The arch was built to commemorate the circumnavigation of the world by Admiral Lord Anson in 1740–44. It was designed by "Athenian" Stuart and is a copy of Hadrian's Arch in Athens. In the spandrels of the arch are medallions with naval themes. On top of the arch is a superstructure containing carvings of a naval structure, flanked by sarcophagi surmounted by busts of Lord and Lady Anson by Peter Scheemakers.	I
Dark Lantern, Shugborough Hall; 52.79502°N 2.02396°W		c. 1765	The building was designed by "Athenian" Stuart and based on the Choragic Monument of Lysicrates in Athens. It has a drum structure, and is surrounded by engaged Corinthian columns. The top is domed, and on it are a bowl, a tripod and dolphin supporters.	I
Temple of the Winds, Shugborough Hall; 52.79495°N 2.01361°W		c. 1765	The building is in plastered brick with a low pyramidal leaded roof, an octagonal plan, and two storeys. On the building are two porches with Corinthian columns and pediments, and a circular stair wing with a domed roof.	II*
Bridge No. 71 (Colwich Bridge); 52.78757°N 1.98789°W		1766–70	The bridge was designed by James Brindley. The bridge is an accommodation bridge over the Trent and Mersey Canal, and is in red brick with stone coping. It has a single elliptical-headed span and a humped back, quoins, and swept wings ending in piers on the lower side.	II
Bridge No. 73 (Trent Lane Bridge); 52.80114°N 2.00734°W		1766–70	The bridge carries Trent Lane over the Trent and Mersey Canal. It is mainly in stone, with some brick, and consists of a single segmental arch.	II
Bridge No. 76 (Hoomill Bridge); 52.81465°N 2.00474°W		1766–70	The bridge, designed by James Brindley, carries a road over the Trent and Mersey Canal. It is in red brick with stone coping and quoins. There is a single segmental arch with a humped back, and it has swept wings ending in piers.	II
Lock No. 21 (Colwich Lock); 52.78763°N 1.98806°W		1766–70	The lock on the Trent and Mersey Canal was designed by James Brindley. It is a narrow lock, and has a brick chamber with stone coping and quoins. There are double steel bottom gates, a single steel top gate, and a footbridge across the tail.	II
Bridge No. 109 (Haywood Junction); 52.80411°N 2.00906°W		1772	The bridge crosses the Staffordshire and Worcestershire Canal at its junction with the Trent and Mersey Canal. The bridge is in red brick with stone coped parapets, and consists of a single wide elliptical arch. The bridge is also a scheduled monument.	II
Colwich Lock Cottage; 52.78769°N 1.98798°W		Late 18th century	The cottage is in painted brick with a string course, a moulded eaves cornice on brackets, and a tile roof. There are two storeys, a single depth plan, three bays, and a single-storey extension to the right. The doorway has a segmental head, and the windows are casements, those on the upper floor with architraves and single wide segmental arch.entablatures.	II
Haywood House, Great Haywood; 52.80271°N 2.00395°W	—	Late 18th century	A red brick house on a stone plinth with floor bands, dentilled eaves, and a tile roof. There are two storeys and an attic, and three bays. The central doorway has a fanlight and a segmental head. The windows are sashes, those in the lower two floors with segmental heads, and in the ground floor also with wedge lintels.	II
Lamb and Flag Inn, Little Haywood; 52.79091°N 1.99392°W		Late 18th century	The public house and adjoining former shop to the right are stuccoed with slate roofs. There are three storeys, a front of three bays, and a later gabled wing to the left. On the front are three shallow bay windows, to the right is a shop window with a cornice hood on foliated consoles, and the doorway has a segmental fanlight. In the upper floor are casement windows, and the wing has sash windows, the one in the ground floor with a cornice hood on foliated consoles.	II
Moreton House; 52.80499°N 1.96664°W		Late 18th century	The house is in brick with a string course and a hipped slate roof. There are two storeys and five bays. It has a Doric porch, a doorway with a segmental fanlight, and a mix of sash and casement windows.	II
Footbridge, Shugborough Park; 52.79865°N 2.01874°W		Late 18th century (probable)	The footbridge crosses a stream in the grounds of Shugborough Hall, which marks the boundary of the parishes of Tixall and Colwich. It is in metal, and consists of three short spans with elaborate open-work parapets. At each end are four openwork piers with decorative caps.	II
Wolseley Bridge; 52.78103°N 1.97099°W		Late 18th century (probable)	The bridge carries the A51 road over the River Trent. It is in stone, and consists of three segmental arches.	II
Shugborough Park Farmhouse; 52.79439°N 2.01396°W		c 1803–06	The farmhouse was designed by Samuel Wyatt, and is in red brick with cogged eaves, and a hipped slate roof. There are two storeys, three bays, and on each side is a projecting gabled bay. In the centre is a doorway with Tuscan pilasters, a radial fanlight, an entablature, and a pediment, and the windows are sashes. At the rear are farm buildings forming a courtyard.	II*
North range of outbuildings, Shugborough Park Farm; 52.79459°N 2.01443°W		c 1803–06	The farm buildings, designed by Samuel Wyatt, are in red brick with slate roofs. In the centre is a two-storey block with a triple-arched arcade and a hipped roof. This is flanked by ranges of cow byres with open sides divided by stone piers. At the ends are two-storey blocks, the one on the left with a hipped roof and a single-storey wing.	II
South range of outbuildings, Shugborough Park Farm; 52.78982°N 2.01792°W	—	c 1803–06	The farm buildings, designed by Samuel Wyatt, are in red brick with a string course and a slate roof. There are two storeys, and the buildings contain various openings, including a group of five openings with segmental heads. In the centre of the range is a former watermill, and at the end is a short single-storey wing.	II*
White Barn Farm; 52.78983°N 2.01795°W	—	c. 1806	Farm buildings, a threshing barn, and two cottages designed by Samuel Wyatt, they form three ranges around a courtyard. The buildings are in brick, and have plain tile and hipped slate roofs.	II*
Hay Barn and Cottages, White Barn Farm; 52.79002°N 2.01828°W	—	c. 1806	The hay barn was designed by Samuel Wyatt, and has been mainly converted for residential use. It is in brick with stone dressings, and has an overhanging slate roof. There is one storey and twelve bays, nine of which have been converted for residential use. Each bay has a round-ended pier. The cottages have casement windows with segmental heads, and above are gabled dormers.	II*
Walled Garden and Gardeners Cottage, Shugborough Estate; 52.79253°N 2.01458°W	—	c. 1806	The cottage is in stone with quoins, a moulded cornice, a parapet, and a hipped slate roof. There are two storeys and four bays. It contains a segmental-headed opening, two doorways with moulded surrounds, and sash windows. On each side are brick walls with stone coping about 3 metres (9.8 ft) high. containing a rusticated gate piers. The walls enclose a trapezoid-shaped garden.	II*
Garden bridge, Shugborough Hall; 52.80196°N 2.01245°W		1813	The bridge crosses a branch of the River Sow near the Chinese House, and is in cast iron. It consists of a single span, and has openwork parapets and decorative pairs of end piers.	I
Milepost north of Hoomill Lock; 52.81587°N 2.00491°W		1819	The milepost is on the towpath of the Trent and Mersey Canal. It is in cast iron, and has a circular post, a moulded head, and two panels indicating the distances to Preston Brook and Shardlow.	II
Milepost north of Mill Lane Crossing; 52.80511°N 2.00879°W		1819	The milepost is on the towpath of the Trent and Mersey Canal. It is in cast iron, and has a circular post, a moulded head, and two panels indicating the distances to Preston Brook and Shardlow.	II
Lodge, Little Haywood; 52.79169°N 1.99676°W	—	Early 19th century	The lodge to Shugborough Hall has plastered walls and a hipped slate roof. At the front is a single storey and two bays. In the centre is a porch with Doric columns and a pediment, and the windows are sashes.	II
Lichfield Lodges, Shugborough Hall; 52.78582°N 2.00257°W	—	Early 19th century	The pair of lodges is at the entrance to the grounds of the hall from the A513 road. The lodges are similar, and are in stone with parapets and pyramidal slate roofs. Each lodge has one storey, a square plan, and one bay. On each side are two Doric columns in a recess, with doorways on the fronts facing the drive, and sash windows elsewhere. Between the lodges are wrought iron gates.	II
Outbuildings southwest of Shugborough Hall; 52.79960°N 2.01371°W		Early 19th century	The outbuildings are in brick with slate roofs, and are arranged around a courtyard. The east range has two storeys and eleven bays. In the centre is a porte-cochère with a pediment containing a clock, and surmounted by a cupola and a wind vane, and in each end bay is an blank arch with a Venetian window above. At the rear on the left is a similar shorter range, with a porte-cochère and a pediment.	II
Stafford Wood Lodge, Shugborough Hall; 52.79079°N 2.03108°W		Early 19th century	The lodge is in stone and has a slate roof. There is one storey, an octagonal plan, two storeys, and a later brick extension to the rear. On the front is a Tuscan porch with a pediment, and the windows are sashes.	II
St John the Baptist's Church, Great Haywood; 52.80215°N 2.00412°W		1827–29	A Roman Catholic church designed by Joseph Ireland that originated as a private chapel at Tixall Hall, and was moved to its present site in 1845. The church is in stone, and consists of a nave and a sanctuary in one unit, a west porch, and an east sacristy. At the southwest is a tall octagonal turret with carved heads below an embattled parapet. Around the church is an embattled parapet, and the windows are Perpendicular, the east window having four lights. Inside the church is a richly carved west gallery.	II
1–4 Trent Lane, Great Haywood; 52.80147°N 2.00628°W		Early to mid 19th century	A row of four cottages in painted brick with slate roofs. They have two storeys and ten bays. There are two doorways with pedimented hoods, and the windows are casements.	II
Cottages opposite 1–4 Trent Lane, Great Haywood; 52.80158°N 2.00641°W		Early to mid 19th century	A row of four cottages in brick with slate roofs. They have two storeys and ten bays. There are two doorways with pedimented hoods, and the windows are casements.	II
Churchyard Cottage, Great Haywood; 52.80239°N 2.00423°W	—	Early to mid 19th century	The cottage is in red brick with dentilled eaves and a tile roof. There are two storeys, two bays, and a later outshut at the right end. The windows are iron-framed casements; the doorway and the windows in the ground floor have cambered heads.	II
Great Haywood Post Office; 52.80168°N 2.00616°W		Early to mid 19th century	A house later used for other purposes, it is in painted roughcast brick with a hipped slate roof. There are two storeys and a symmetrical front of three bays. In the centre is a doorway with Doric columns and a pediment, and the windows are sashes.	II
Trent House, Great Haywood; 52.80156°N 2.00605°W	—	Early to mid 19th century	A house in roughcast brick with a hipped slate roof. There are two storeys and a symmetrical front of three bays. In the centre is a doorway with Doric columns and a pediment, and the windows are sashes.	II
St Stephen's Church, Great Haywood; 52.80048°N 2.00502°W		1840	The church was enlarged and largely rebuilt in 1858. It is in sandstone with a slate roof, and is in Gothic Revival style. The church consists of a nave and a chancel in one unit, a south aisle with west and south porches, and a north vestry. On the west gable end is a bellcote.	II
School House and former school 52.78814°N 1.98454°W	—	1841	The older part is the school, and the school house was designed by Ewan Christian in 1860. The buildings are in red brick with stone dressings and tile roofs. The house has two storeys and an L-shaped plan, quoins, and coped gables. The doorway has a pointed arch and a hood mould, there is a canted bay window on the front, and the windows are mullioned. The former school to the left is in similar style.	II
Screen, walls, terrace and parterre curb, Bishton Hall; 52.78536°N 1.96626°W	—	1840s	The buildings are in pink sandstone, and to the north of the parterre garden which is to the north of the hall. They consist of a screen with a summer house in the centre in the form of a hexastyle Greek Doric temple, with flanking porticos distyle in antis. In front of the screen is a terrace with vases, and steps leading down to a formal garden with low boundary walls, and a parterre with large moulded curb stones.	II*
Lichfield Drive Railway Bridge, Shugborough Park; 52.78808°N 2.00558°W	—	c. 1847	The bridge carries the railway over the drive, and is in Classical style. It is in stone, and consists of a rusticated elliptical arch with a keystone carved with a head. The arch is flanked by pairs of unfluted Ionic with a round-headed niche between, and above is a moulded frieze and cornice. On the top is an entablature divided into three parts, with balustrading between the parts, the central section with a heraldic device. The supporting walls curve down, they are balustraded, and end in stone piers.	II
Tunnel Entrances, Shugborough Park; 52.79205°N 2.02933°W		1847	The entrances to the railway tunnel are in stone. The west entrance is the more elaborate, and is in Gothic style. It has a round-headed arch, with a rusticated surround. The arch is flanked by embattled turrets, and between them is an embattled parapet. The east entrance is plainer, and also has a round-headed arch with a rusticated surround.	II
Former Railway Station House; 52.78839°N 1.98663°W		1848	The house is in stone with a tile roof. There are two storeys and a cruciform plan, with a later lean-to extension to the south. On each front is a shaped Dutch gable with a finial, and the windows are sashes.	II
Colwich Lock Cottage Privy; 52.78775°N 1.98822°W		Mid 19th century	The privy is to the northwest of the cottage. It is in painted brick with a tile roof, and ventilation holes at the rear, and is sited above the lock overflow weir.	II
Mill Lane Railway Bridge; 52.80459°N 2.00702°W		Mid 19th century	The bridge carries the railway over Mill Lane. It is in stone, and consists of a single flat rusticated segmental arch. The bridge has a moulded string course, and coped parapets with square buttresses at the ends.	II
Mortuary Chapel, St Mary's Abbey; 52.79046°N 1.98897°W	—	Mid 19th century	The mortuary chapel in the grounds of the abbey is in stone and brick, and has a slate roof with a coped gable. It has a roughly square plan, and contains a doorway with a pointed arch and a hood mould, flanked by two-stage angle buttresses. Above the doorway with a window in the form of a Reuleaux triangle, and at the apex of the gable is a carved cross.	II
Trent Lane Railway Bridge; 52.80133°N 2.00680°W		Mid 19th century	The bridge carries the railway over Trent Lane. It is in stone, and consists of a single flat rusticated segmental arch, with flanking smaller round-headed pedestrian arches. At the ends are square piers.	II
Colwich Primary School; 52.78815°N 1.98494°W		1860	The school, designed by Ewan Christian, is in red brick with stone dressings, quoins, and a tile roof with coped gables and ball finials. There is a single storey and an E-shaped plan. The windows are mullioned and either single or double-transomed. In the right gable is a stone tablet with a coat of arms, and on the east front is a gabled porch.	II
Trent Lodge, Shugborough Hall; 52.80027°N 2.00922°W		1869	The lodge at the entrance to the drive is in stone with a tile roof, and has one storey. On the front is a projecting bay window containing a Venetian window, above which is a dated shield. The windows are sashes, and to the right is a projecting porch with a round-headed arch.	II
Cat's Monument, Shugborough Hall; 52.80201°N 2.01164°W		Undated	The monument in the grounds of the hall commemorates the cat that accompanied Admiral Lord Anson on his circumnavigation of the world. It is in stone, and consists of a tall rectangular pedestal with an urn surmounted by a cat.	II
Shepherd's Monument, Shugborough Hall; 52.80140°N 2.01253°W		Undated	The monument in the grounds of the hall is in stone, and consists of an entablature with Doric columns, a frieze with triglyphs and other motifs, and a parapet, with discrete motifs. The entablature contains an arch enclosing a marble sculpture in relief by Peter Scheemakers based on Et in Arcadia ego by Nicolas Poussin.	II*
