= Little Haywood =

Village in Staffordshire, England

Coordinates: 52.7911°N 1.9911°W

- Village
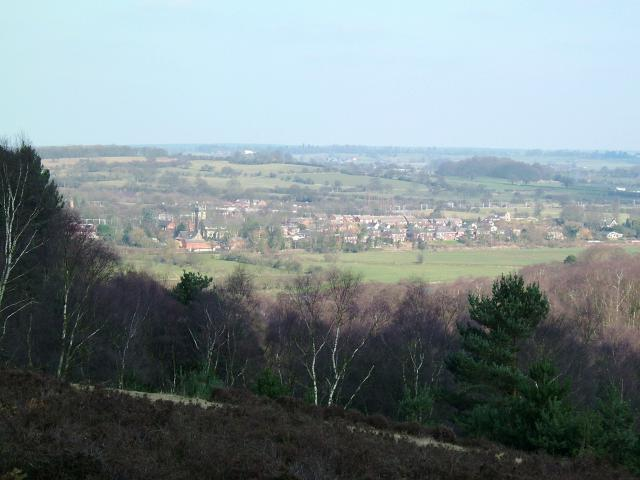
- View of the village

- Location within Staffordshire
- OS grid reference: SK005215
- District: Stafford
- Shire county: Staffordshire
- Region: West Midlands
- Country: England
- Sovereign state: United Kingdom
- Post town: Stafford
- Postcode district: ST18
- Police: Staffordshire
- Fire: Staffordshire
- Ambulance: West Midlands
- UK Parliament: Stone, Great Wyrley and Penkridge

Little Haywood is a village in the Borough of Stafford in the county of Staffordshire, England. The population taken at the 2011 census was under Colwich. It lies beside the A51 road. Nearby is the West Coast Main Line, the Trent and Mersey Canal and beside it, the River Trent. Little Haywood is about 4 miles (6.4 km) northwest of Rugeley and 6 miles (9.7 km) east of Stafford.

Little Haywood is cited in the Domesday Book of 1086.

== Location ==
Little Haywood is situated on the side of a hill in the system of valleys drained by the rivers Trent and Sow. It lies near the northern edge of The Chase and is surrounded in the main by farmland. Geologically, the village lies on Triassic sandstone of the Sherwood Sandstone Group, with overlying glacial deposits from the last glaciation of Great Britain.

The village name is derived from the Old English "haeg wadu," meaning an enclosure in woodland.

== Waterways ==
There are three main waterways running near to Little Haywood: the River Sow, the River Trent and the Trent and Mersey Canal, which was opened in 1777. A wooden footbridge carrying Meadow Lane across the Trent was built in 1830. Previously the river was crossed by a ford, which was still used by cattle and horse-drawn vehicles after the footbridge was constructed. This wooden bridge was replaced by a brick- and stone-built Weetman's Bridge in 1887. Less than 2 miles (3.2 km) northwest of Little Haywood, the northeastern end of the Staffordshire and Worcestershire Canal joins the Trent and Mersey Canal. The Trent and Mersey Canal mile post at Little Haywood is number 37.

== Features and facilities ==
=== Saint Mary's Abbey ===
The most prominent building in Little Haywood is Saint Mary's Abbey, Colwich. This Roman Catholic abbey is home to a community of enclosed Benedictine nuns and although part of the neighbouring Colwich parish, the abbey and its grounds lie alongside the road that runs through Little Haywood.

The Abbey Church of Saint Mary used to cover a large amount of Little Haywood and it has been said that there are tunnels leading from the abbey to Lichfield Cathedral, 10 miles (16 km) away, and to Shugborough Hall, a little over 1 mile (1.6 km) away in the opposite direction. Within the village, on land owned by Shugborough Hall, there is evidence of small-scale stone quarrying in the area known to locals as "the cliffs" or "the caves".

=== Amenities ===
The village and its outlying neighbours have an active parish community; the parish council organises events such as village fetes and on a day-to-day basis the social life of the village revolves around its public houses.There is no church in Little Haywood, no village green and no school. There are, however, the two pubs with the nearest general store being situated within Great Haywood. The nearby village of Colwich is less than 1 mile (1.6 km) away and has a church and a primary school but no pub or general store, and so amenities are often shared.

=== Wall ===
At the side of the road that runs from Little Haywood towards the village of Great Haywood, 1 mile (1.6 km) away, is an example of a "make work wall", built by employees of Earl Talbot at Haywood Manor (no longer standing) during times when there was little else to do. In order to keep the workers from being idle, Talbot would make work for them in the form of features whose purpose might best be described as decorative.

== J. R. R. Tolkien ==
The village was home to the newly married Edith Tolkien, wife of author J. R. R. Tolkien, from March 1916 to February 1917. Tolkien stayed with his wife in Cottage 1, Gipsy Green, on the Teddesley Park Estate, near the village during the winter of 1916, whilst recuperating from trench fever. The surrounding landscape of Cannock Chase was said to be an inspiration for his early literary works about Middle-earth.. At the cottage he began work on what would become The Silmarillion. The village of Norbury lies about 14 miles (23 km) away and may relate to the "Norbury of the Kings" that appears in The Lord of the Rings.

== Tragic accidents at Colwich Junction ==
On 18 September 1986 two passenger trains collided at Colwich Junction, less than half a mile from Little Haywood, killing the driver of one of the trains and injuring 75 passengers. Several carriages of the crowded InterCity services were derailed. On 2 January 2009, a Piper Cherokee single engine light aircraft came down at Colwich junction, killing the three people on board, Nicholas O’Brien, Emma O’Brien and Alan Matthews (The pilot). Nicholas and Emma left behind their young son Joel and his brother Callum.

== See also ==
- Listed buildings in Colwich, Staffordshire
