= William Barton (hymnologist) =

William Barton (1598?–1678), was an English hymnologist.

== Life ==
Barton must have been born "about 1598" from his recorded age at death (eighty). Late in life Barton was vicar of St. Martin's, Leicester. He is probably to be identified with the William Barton who was vicar of Mayfield, Staffordshire, at the opening of the civil wars, and who is described in a certificate presented to the House of Lords 19 June 1643 as "a man of godly life, and able and orthodox in his ministry", and as "having been forced to desert his flock and family by the plundering cavaliers of Staffordshire". In Cole's Athen. Cantab, he is described as a "conforming Puritan". From Oliver Heywood's "Obituaries" we learn the time of his death: "1678. Mr. William Barton of St. Martin's in Leicester died in May, aged 80".

== Works ==
His verse-translation of the Psalms was first published in 1644. It was reprinted and altered in 1645, 1646, 1651, 1654, and later. The text having been revised for "the last time" by its author, it was posthumously republished in 1682. In the preface Barton says: "I have (in this my last translation) corrected all the harsh passages and added a great number of second metres." He continues: "The Scots of late have put forth a Psalm-book mostwhat composed out of mine and Mr. Rouse's; but it did not give full satisfaction, for somebody hath been at charge to put forth a new edition of mine, and printed some thousands of mine, in Holland, as it is reported. But whether they were printed there or no I am in doubt; for I am sure that 1,500 of my books were heretofore printed by stealth in England and carried over to Ireland". In 1654 he had prepared the way for his enlarged and improved Psalms by publishing A View of the many Errors and some gross Absurdities in the old Translations of the Psalms in English Metre (Douce's copy in Bodleian). In 1659 he published A Century of Select Hymns. This was enlarged in 1668 to Four Centuries, and in 1688 to Six Centuries, the last being edited by his son, Edward Barton, minister of Welford in Northamptonshire. His Centuries were dedicated to Sir Matthew Hale. Richard Baxter suggested that Barton should specially translate and versify the Te Deum.
