= Listed buildings in Mayfield, Staffordshire =

Mayfield is a civil parish in the district of East Staffordshire, Staffordshire, England. It contains 39 listed buildings that are recorded in the National Heritage List for England. Of these, one is listed at Grade I, the highest of the three grades, two are at Grade II*, the middle grade, and the others are at Grade II, the lowest grade. The parish includes the village of Mayfield and smaller settlements, including Upper Mayfield, Middle Mayfield, and Church Mayfield, and is otherwise rural. Most of the listed buildings are houses and associated structures, cottages, farmhouses and farm buildings. The other listed buildings include a church, items in the churchyard, a chapel, and two mileposts.

== Key ==
Grade	Criteria
I	Buildings of exceptional interest, sometimes considered to be internationally important
II*	Particularly important buildings of more than special interest
II	Buildings of national importance and special interest

== Buildings ==
Name and location	Photograph	Date	Notes	Grade
St John the Baptist's Church; 52.99985°N 1.77154°W		Late 12th century	The church was extended and remodelled in the 14th century, the tower was added in 1515, and the north aisle was rebuilt in 1854. The church is built in stone, most of the roof is tiled, and the south aisle has a lead-covered roof. The church consists of a nave, north and south aisles, a south porch, a chancel and a west tower. The tower has three stages, a west Tudor arched doorway, clock faces, and an embattled parapet with central and corner pinnacles and gargoyles. The south doorway and the south arcade are Norman in style.	I
Churchyard cross 52.99972°N 1.77148°W	—	15th century (probable)	The cross is in the churchyard of St John the Baptist's Church. It is in stone, and consists of a square shaft with chamfered edges on a 20th-century base. The north arm has been broken off.	II
Brook Farmhouse and outbuilding 53.00135°N 1.78114°W	—	17th century	The farmhouse and outbuilding are in stone, and have tile roofs with coped verges. The house has one storey and five bays, and the three-bay outbuilding projects from the left to form an L-shaped plan. The doorway has pilasters and an entablature, and the windows in the house are mullioned with chamfered surrounds. Above the ground floor windows is a continuous hood mould that rises above the doorway, and between the lower and upper windows are blind panels. In the gable end of the outbuilding is a casement window.	II
Deveron Cottage and adjoining cottage 53.00118°N 1.78204°W	—	17th century	A pair of stone cottages with a tile roof. They have two storeys and two bays each. All the windows are modern casements, and the left hand cottage has a gabled porch. In the roof are two upper cruck trusses.	II
Home Farmhouse; 53.00272°N 1.78069°W	—	17th century	The farmhouse is in stone and has a tile roof with coped verges. There are two storeys and an attic, and an L-shaped plan consisting of a main block with three bays, and a rear service wing. The windows are mullioned with rebated surrounds, and continuous hood moulds, in the ground floor stepped up over the central doorway. Above the two attic windows are small gables.	II
Old Hall Farmhouse, Middle Mayfield, wall and gate piers 53.00086°N 1.78168°W		17th century	The farmhouse is in stone and has a tile roof with coped verges. The main part has two storeys and an attic and three gabled bays, and there is a two-storey single-bay extension to the right. The gables have coped verges on shaped kneelers. There is one casement window, the attic windows are mullioned, and the other windows are mullioned and transomed with hood moulds. On the front is a gabled porch with a four-centred arch and a cross finial, and a doorway with a square head. Inside the farmhouse is a timber framed partition and an inglenook fireplace. Enclosing the front garden is a coped stone wall, and a pair of gate piers with a square section and each with a concave-sided cap.	II*
Old Hall Farmhouse, Upper Mayfield; 53.01179°N 1.77498°W	—	1680	The farmhouse is in stone and has a tile roof with coped verges. There are two storeys and an attic and an H-shaped plan, with fronts of three gabled bays, the middle bay slightly recessed. Each gable has shaped kneelers and a ball finial, and the windows are mullioned with chamfered surrounds and hood moulds. The projecting porch is also gabled with a ball finial.	II*
Memorial 1 yard south of south aisle 52.99979°N 1.77153°W	—	Late 17th to early 18th century	The memorial is in the churchyard of St John the Baptist's Church. It is a chest tomb in stone with an oblong plan. The tomb has a hollow chamfered base, moulded capping, chamfered under edges, panelled sides, pilaster strips on the corners, and an inscription on the south side that is largely illegible.	II
Memorial 3 yards south of south aisle 52.99977°N 1.77151°W	—	Late 17th to early 18th century	The memorial is in the churchyard of St John the Baptist's Church. It is a chest tomb in stone with an oblong plan. The tomb has moulded capping with chamfered under edges, panelled sides, and pilaster strips on the corners.	II
Memorial south of south porch 52.99975°N 1.77157°W	—	Late 17th to early 18th century	The memorial is in the churchyard of St John the Baptist's Church. It is a chest tomb in stone with an oblong plan. The tomb has a hollow chamfered base, moulded capping with chamfered under edges, and panelled sides and ends. The inscription is illegible.	II
Calwichbank Farmhouse; 52.99392°N 1.80059°W	—	1729	The farmhouse is in stone with a band, a coved eaves course, and a tile roof. There are two storeys and an attic, two parallel ranges, a front of five bays, and a single-storey extension to the right. The central doorway has rusticated pilasters, and a moulded cornice. The windows are mullioned and contain casements.	II
The Hermitage; 53.00264°N 1.77911°W	—	1749	The house, which was extended in the 19th century, is in red brick on a sandstone plinth, and has a roof of tile and slate. There are two storeys and an L-shaped plan, the original range having five bays and a dentilled eaves course, and the later range at right angles with a moulded eaves cornice. The doorway has a moulded architrave and an oblong fanlight. The windows are sashes, and there is a segmental-headed stair window with an inscribed lintel.	II
Cottages and wall, Mayfield Hall; 53.00272°N 1.78102°W	—	18th century	A pair of cottages in stone with coved eaves, and a tile roof hipped to the right and with a coped verge to the left. There are two storeys and four bays. In the outer bays are doorways with keystones, and the windows are mullioned. To the left is a wall about 5 yards (4.6 m) long containing a round-headed doorway in the middle.	II
Piers and walls, Mayfield Hall; 53.00262°N 1.78101°W	—	18th century	The gate piers flank the entrance to the east of the hall, and there are end piers, and intermediate piers in the wall. The piers are in stone, they have a square section and pyramidal caps. The walls are coped and run to the west for about 10 yards (9.1 m) and to the east for about 150 yards (140 m). In the east section is a pedestrian gateway that has gate piers with ball finials.	II
Steps and wall, Mayfield Hall; 53.00254°N 1.78167°W	—	18th century (probable)	The garden steps and retaining wall are in stone. The steps have an hour glass plan, the upper half concave, and the lower half convex. The retaining wall is adjacent to the upper half.	II
Stables, Mayfield Hall; 53.00283°N 1.78175°W	—	18th century	The former stables are in stone with a tile roof, one storey and seven bays. Above the main doorway is a three-bay pediment containing an oculus. There are three doorways to the right of it and one to the left, and the windows are sashes.	II
Mayfield House; 53.00113°N 1.76685°W	—	18th century (probable)	The house, which was remodelled in the 19th century, is in red brick with stone dressings, quoins, a slate roof, and an openwork parapet. There are two storeys, and the windows are sashes with shaped lintels grooved as voussoirs and raised keystones. The northwest front has six bays, and contains a two-storey bay window. The south front has three bays, the central bay recessed. The outer bays are two-storey canted bay windows, and in the middle bay is a Corinthian portico with a balustraded balcony. In the upper floor are round-headed casement windows above which is a triangular pediment. In the angles are panelled square piers.	II
Corner Farmhouse, steps and walls 53.01210°N 1.77278°W		Mid to late 18th century	The farmhouse is in stone and has a tile roof with coped verges. There is an L-shaped plan, consisting of a main range with two storeys and an attic, a moulded eaves cornice, and three bays, and a lower rear wing with three storeys. The central doorway has a bracketed hood, and above is a Venetian window with Tuscan pilasters and full entablatures above the side lights. The other windows are sashes with moulded architraves and raised keystones. In front of the house are retaining walls enclosing the gardens and flanking a flight of steps.	II
The Cottage and Brierfield; 53.01184°N 1.77218°W	—	1768	A house extended in 1903, and divided into two, it is in stone and has a tile roof with coped verges. There are two storeys, a three-bay range, and a recessed two bay range to the right. In the left range are two chamfered mullioned windows, casement windows with hood moulds, and a doorway with a segmental head. The right range contains casement windows and has a gabled porch.	II
Martenhill Farmhouse and cottage 53.02905°N 1.78716°W	—	Late 18th century	The farmhouse and the 19th-century cottage attached to the right are in stone with tile roofs. The farmhouse has quoins, two storeys and an attic, and three bays, and it contains sash windows. The cottage has two storeys, two bays, and contains casement windows.	II
Mayfield Hall; 53.00254°N 1.78130°W	—	Late 18th century	The house is in ashlar stone and has a hipped slate roof and three storeys. The windows in the lower two floors are sashes, and in the top floor they are casements. The east front has seven bays with a pediment over the middle three bays, and a two-bay rectangular projection to the left. The south front has five bays and a two-storey angled projection to the right. Also on this front is a Tuscan porch.	II
Service wing and tower, Mayfield Hall; 53.00270°N 1.78131°W		Late 18th century	The service wing is in stone with bands and a tile roof. There are two storeys and three bays. In the centre is a round-headed carriage archway, over which is a tower containing a clock, and with a domed cupola surmounted by a lantern with an acorn finial. In the service block are casement windows, and a doorway with a moulded architrave and a moulded cornice.	II
The Vicarage and Matherfield House; 53.00050°N 1.76974°W	—	Late 18th century	A pair of red brick houses that have a tile roof with coped verges on shaped kneelers. There are two storeys and attics, and two parallel ranges. Each house has three bays, and contains sash windows. Matherfield House has a doorway with an oblong fanlight. The doorway in the Vicarage has a segmental head, and the windows have grooved lintels and raised keystones.	II
Standcliffe Farmhouse; 53.00912°N 1.77615°W	—	c. 1800	A stone farmhouse with a coved eaves course, a pyramidal slate roof, two storeys, a square plan, and fronts of two bays. In the centre is a doorway with a pediment, and the windows are casements.	II
Mayfield Cottage, walls, railings, and gate 53.00115°N 1.78139°W	—	Early 19th century	A stone house with a slate roof, two storeys, and an L-shaped plan, consisting of a front range of three bays and a rear wing. In the centre is a cast iron trellis-work porch with a concave sided roof. The windows are sashes, most with colonnettes as mullions flanking the central lights, and shaped lintels. A side wall to the right and a dwarf front wall in front with decorative cast iron railings and a gate enclose the front garden.	II
Coach House, Mayfield Hall; 53.00281°N 1.78144°W	—	Early 19th century	The coach house is in stone and red brick with a stepped eaves course, and a tile roof with a coped verge on the right. There is one storey and a loft, and three bays. In the centre is a doorway with a segmental head, to the left is a coach arch, to the right is a loft opening, and there is another loft opening in the south gable end.	II
Former Coach House, Mayfield House; 53.00164°N 1.76694°W	—	Early 19th century	The former coach house is in stone with chamfered quoins and a flat felted roof, and is in Gothic style. There is one storey and three bays. To the right is a tall pointed coach arch with chamfered jambs and voussoirs, and to the left are two lancet windows.	II
Stables, Mayfield House; 53.00148°N 1.76675°W	—	Early 19th century	The former stables are in stone with chamfered quoins and a flat felted roof, and are in Gothic style. There is one storey and five bays. In the centre is a doorway with a pointed head, chamfered jambs and voussoirs, flanked by two lancet windows on each side. In the south gable end is a similar doorway with a unicorn motif. The north gable end has external steps leading up to the former loft door.	II
Root house 53.00079°N 1.76723°W	—	Early 19th century	A summer house made from roots and branches, with a felt roof, and in Gothick style. It has one storey and contains ogee-headed windows and doorway.	II
Former cowhouse and stable, Calwichbank Farm; 52.99407°N 1.80025°W	—	1827	The former farm buildings are in stone with tile roofs, and each has one storey and four bays. The former stable has a loft, four roof louvres, a stable door, casement windows and blocked openings, and the former cowhouse to the left is taller and also has a stable door and blocked openings. On the southwest gable end are external steps to the loft door.	II
Mayfield Methodist Chapel, walls, gate, piers, and railings 53.01162°N 1.77153°W		1827	The chapel is in stone and has a tile roof with coped verges. There are two storeys, three bays, and later extensions on the right and at the rear. The central porch has a flat cornice hood, and the windows are cross windows. At the front of the churchyard is a dwarf wall, gate piers with a square section and pyramidal caps, and decorative iron railings and a gate.	II
Milepost near Ivy Cottage; 53.01317°N 1.77415°W		1834	The mile post is on the southwest side of the A52 road. It is in cast iron, and has a circular shaft and a head with three panels. On the top is inscribed the name of the maker, the panels indicate the distances in miles to Leek and to Ashbourne, and on the shaft the distance to London.	II
Stable, Calwichbank Farm; 52.99402°N 1.79990°W	—	Early to mid 19th century	The stable is in stone with a tile roof, and has one storey and a loft. It contains a stable door and three windows, and in the south gable end is a pitching hole. Outside are a trough and a milk churn.	II
Gate piers, Mayfield House and stables 53.00125°N 1.76702°W	—	Early to mid 19th century	Two pairs of gate piers flanking the entrances to Mayfield House and its stables. The piers are in stone, they are rusticated, and have pyramidal caps.	II
Milepost near Red House; 52.99420°N 1.79287°W		Early to mid 19th century	The milepost is in cast iron, and has a triangular section and a chamfered top. On the top face is inscribed "MAYFIELD" and the other faces indicate the distances to Ashbourne, Ellastone, Rocester, and Uttoxeter.	II
Stables and cowhouses, Old Hall Farm, Middle Mayfield; 53.00090°N 1.78232°W	—	Early to mid 19th century	The stables and cowhouses are in red brick and have tile roofs with coped verges. They form three ranges on the north, east and south sides of a courtyard. The east range contains stables, it has a dentilled eaves course, two storeys and twelve bays. The range contains windows, some mullioned, some casements, stable doors, a carriage arch, and vents. The north and south ranges are lower and contain cowhouses. They each have six bays, casement windows and loft doors. All the openings have four-centred arched heads.	II
Stable, Old Hall Farm, Upper Mayfield; 53.01190°N 1.77461°W	—	1845	The stable is in stone and has a tile roof with coped verges. There is one storey, and it contains three stable doors, one with a dated and initialled lintel, and cast iron windows.	II
Former hay barn, Old Hall Farm, Upper Mayfield; 53.01174°N 1.77445°W	—	Mid 19th century	The former hay barn is in stone with a tile roof. There are two storeys, a three-bay range on the left, and a lower two-bay range on the right. In the centre is a segmental headed carriage arch, and the upper floor of the left two bays is boarded. The barn contains doorways and a loft door.	II
The Old School House; 53.00625°N 1.76963°W	—	1853	A pair of houses in stone with a hipped tile roof and alternate crested ridge tiles. They are in Neo-Norman style, and have two storeys and an L-shaped plan, with a front range of four bays, and a rear wing. In the second bay on the front is a round-headed doorway over which is a dedication stone. The windows are casements in round-headed pairs, each with a central chamfered mullion.	II
