= Garden bridge, Shugborough =

Garden Bridge
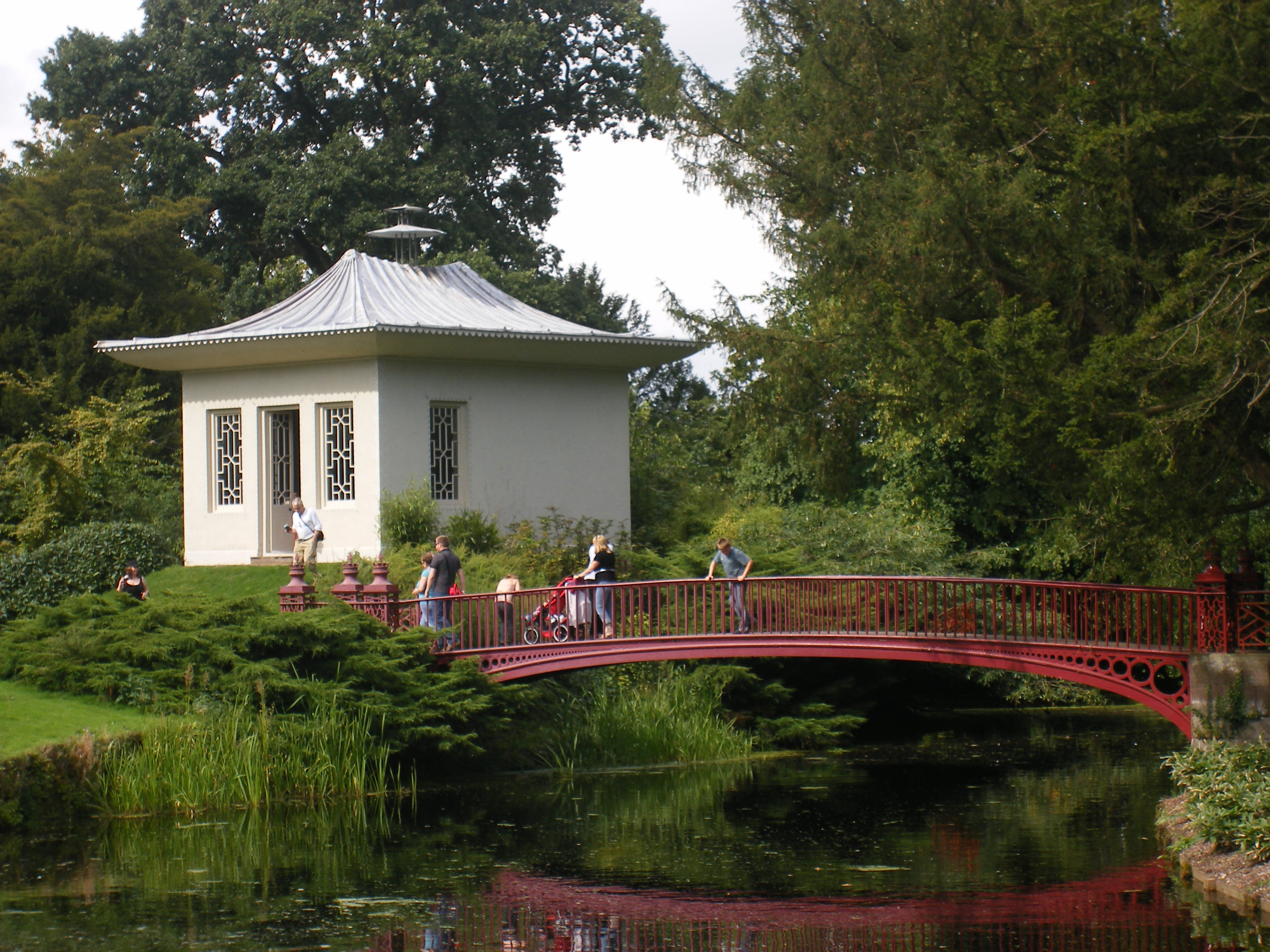
- Coordinates: 52°48′07″N 2°00′45″W
- Carries: Pedestrians
- Crosses: River Sow
- Locale: Shugborough
- Maintained by: National Trust

Characteristics
- Design: Arch bridge
- Material: Iron
- No. of spans: 1

The Garden bridge in the grounds of Shugborough Hall is a cast-iron footbridge in Staffordshire, England. Dated to around 1800, It is notable as an example of chinoiserie and complements a Chinese House which is believed to be somewhat earlier.

The bridge provides access to an island site which has been created by regulating the River Sow. The bridge spans the River Sow and is one of a pair of bridges leading to the island. In the 20th century Patrick Lichfield used the island to create an oak arboretum.

== History ==
The Chinese theme reflects the interests of the Anson family. It has been seen as an allusion to the voyages of Admiral George Anson who visited Canton in 1743 while circumnavigating the globe.

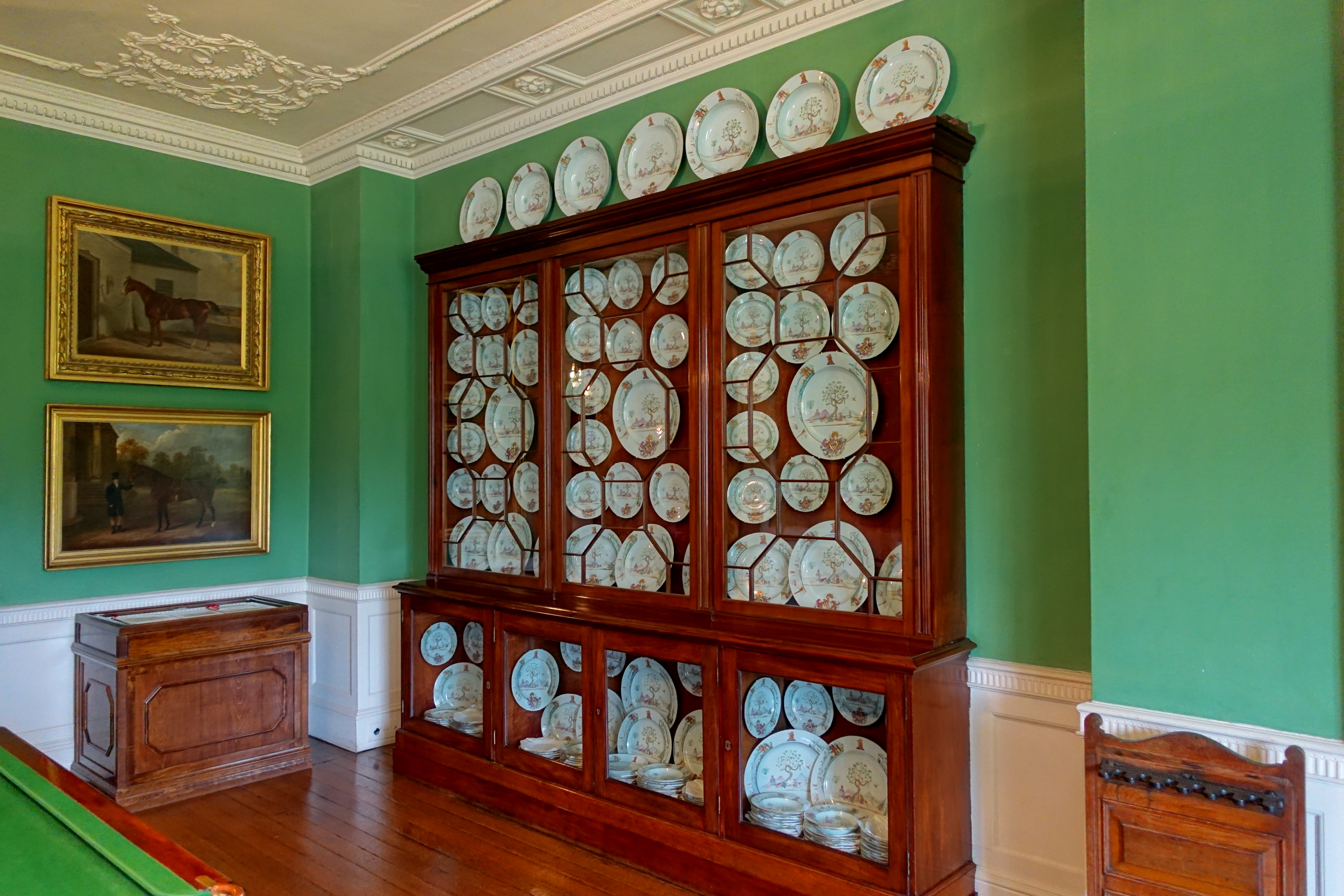
Dinner service made in Jingdezhen and decorated in Canton

Shugborough Hall preserves Chinese objects associated with the admiral including a large set of armorial porcelain, a 208-piece dinner service made in the Qianlong period.

== Conservation ==
The Shugborough estate is in the care of the National Trust and includes a number of structures protected by heritage listings including the Hall itself, the Garden bridge and the Chinese House. The listing of the bridge has been raised to Grade I, as has that of the Chinese House. The other bridge to the island is listed Grade II.

== See also ==
- Listed buildings in Colwich, Staffordshire
