= Listed buildings in Alstonefield =

Alstonefield is a civil parish in the district of Staffordshire Moorlands, Staffordshire, England. It contains 56 listed buildings that are recorded in the National Heritage List for England. Of these, one is listed at Grade I, the highest of the three grades, three are at Grade II*, the middle grade, and the others are at Grade II, the lowest grade. The parish contains the villages of Alstonefield and Stanshope, and the surrounding countryside. Most of the listed buildings are houses and associated structures, cottages, and farmhouses, that are built in limestone with tile roofs. The other listed buildings include a church and items in the churchyard, bridges, a public house, mileposts, a former watermill, and structures in the grounds of the former Beresford Hall.

== Key ==
Grade	Criteria
I	Buildings of exceptional interest, sometimes considered to be internationally important
II*	Particularly important buildings of more than special interest
II	Buildings of national importance and special interest

== Buildings ==
Name and location	Photograph	Date	Notes	Grade
Base of cross shaft 53.09526°N 1.80302°W		10th century (probable)	The cross base is in the churchyard of St Peter's Church. It is in stone, and has a roughly square base, and a cross shaft with carved panels of interlace. The cross fragment is also a scheduled monument.	II*
St Peter's Church; 53.09513°N 1.80315°W		12th century	The church was altered and extended during the following centuries and restored in 1870. It is built in limestone and sandstone, and has slate roofs. The church consists of a nave with a clerestory, north and south aisles, north and south porches, a chancel and a west tower. The tower has four stages, angle buttresses, a west doorway, and an embattled parapet with crocketed finials on the corners. The south doorway and the chancel arch are Norman in style.	I
Viator's Bridge; 53.08902°N 1.79372°W		Early 16th century (probable)	A packhorse bridge crossing the River Dove, it is in stone. The bridge consists of two roughly four-centred arches, with a buttress between them. The bridge is also a scheduled monument.	II
Hall Farmhouse; 53.09628°N 1.80374°W	—	1587	The farmhouse is in stone with quoins, and stone slate roofs with coped verges on kneelers. There are two storeys and an L-shaped plan, with a hall range, and a cross-wing consisting of a two-storey gabled porch projecting to the front, and a service wing to the rear. In the porch is a central doorway with a cambered lintel, above which is a three-light window with a hood mould, and a datestone, and on the gable apex is a ball finial. To the right of the porch is one bay, and the windows have chamfered mullions.	II*
Sycamore Farmhouse; 53.09715°N 1.80699°W	—	1619	The farmhouse, which was altered in the 19th century, is in limestone with a tile roof. There are two storeys and four bays. The doorway has a cambered lintel, and the windows are casements, one of which has retained its chamfered mullion and hood mould.	II
Stanshope Hall; 53.08540°N 1.81148°W		Early 17th century	The house was extended and remodelled in the 18th and 19th centuries. It is mainly in limestone with quoins, and it has a tile roof with coped verges on kneelers. There are three storeys and an H-shaped plan, with a central range of two bays, and projecting gabled cross-wings. The right return is in brick, and has five bays. In the right bay of the central range is a doorway, and to the left is a canted bay window, and the windows above and in the wings have mullions and transoms.	II
Bench near Charles Cotton's Fishing House; 53.12990°N 1.81110°W	—	17th century	The bench is in stone, and has two moulded legs, and a flat bench seat with chamfered edges.	II
Yew Tree Cottage; 53.09690°N 1.80792°W	—	17th century	The house, which was later altered and extended, is in limestone, and has a tile roof. There are two storeys and two bays. On the front is a gabled porch and a doorway with a cambered and shouldered head. The windows are mullioned, those in the left bay with hood moulds.	II
Charles Cotton's Fishing House; 53.13004°N 1.81103°W		1674	The fishing house, built for Charles Cotton, is in stone, with quoins and a pyramidal stone slate roof. There is one storey, a square plan, and one bay. Steps lead up to a central double door with a round head, pilasters, and a raised keystone inscribed with initials. The flanking windows have transoms, latticed lights, and shutters. The building is also a scheduled monument.	II*
Ash Tree Farmhouse; 53.09967°N 1.80728°W	—	18th century	The farmhouse is in limestone with a tile roof. There are two storeys and an attic, and three bays. The doorway has chamfered jambs and a bracketed hood, and the windows are mullioned and contain casements.	II
Church Farmhouse, Stanshope; 53.08565°N 1.80987°W	—	18th century	The farmhouse is in limestone with a tile roof. There are three storeys, three bays, and a lower two-storey three-bay extension to the right. In the main block the windows in the lower two floors are sashes, in the top floor they are mullioned, and the extension contains casement windows.	II
Stable and granary, Dud View Farm; 53.08585°N 1.81186°W	—	18th century (probable)	The stable and granary are in limestone with quoins, and it has a tile roof with coped verges. There are two storeys and five bays. The building contains carriage doors, stable doors, windows, and a ventilation slit.	II
Grange Farmhouse, Stanshope; 53.08499°N 1.81288°W	—	18th century	The farmhouse is in stone, and it has a tile roof with coped verges. There are two storeys and four bays. On the front is a gabled porch and a tall mullioned and transomed stair window. The other windows have flat mullions, and those in the ground floor also have hood moulds.	II
Hope House; 53.09451°N 1.81425°W	—	18th century	The house is in limestone, and has a tile roof with coped verges on kneelers. There are two storeys and an attic, two bays, and a low single-bay extension to the left. The windows are casements with two lights, flat-faced mullions, and hood moulds.	II
Lode Mill Bridge; 53.09274°N 1.78351°W		18th century	The bridge carries Lode Lane over the River Dove. It is in limestone with gritstone coping to the parapet, and consists of a single semi-elliptical arch. The parapet rises to a point in the centre, and it ends in square piers with pyramidal caps.	II
Manifold Cottage; 53.09769°N 1.80700°W	—	18th century	The house, which was extended in the 19th century, is in limestone with a tile roof. There are two storeys and three bays. On the front is a gabled porch, and the windows are casements, the earlier ones with mullions.	II
The Grove Farmhouse, Stanshope; 53.08657°N 1.80949°W	—	18th century	The farmhouse is in limestone with quoins, and it has a tile roof with coped verges. There are two storeys and an attic, and an L-shaped plan, with a front of three bays, and a rear wing. The windows have flat-faced mullions and contain casements, there is one French window, and a gabled dormer in the attic.	II
Riverdales and The Hermitage; 53.09696°N 1.80673°W	—	18th century	Originally a workhouse, later a private house, it is in limestone, and has a tile roof with coped verges on kneelers. There are three storeys and three bays. The central doorway has a bracketed cornice hood, the windows in the lower two floors are sashes, and in the top floor they are casements.	II
Chapel Farm House; 53.09780°N 1.80467°W		1763	The farmhouse is in limestone, and has a tile roof with coped verges on kneelers. There are two storeys, three bays, the right bay projecting under a catslide roof, and a low extension to the left. The windows are casements, there is a central doorway, and a continuous hood mould over the doorway and ground floor windows.	II
The George Inn; 53.09716°N 1.80535°W		Late 18th century	The building, which was later altered, originated as a farmhouse, and was later a public house. It is in limestone, and has a tile roof with coped verges on kneelers. There are two storeys and four bays. On the front is a glazed porch with a hipped roof. The windows in the ground floor are mullioned with casements, and in the upper floor they are sashes.	II
The Old Post Office; 53.09705°N 1.80569°W		Late 18th century	A row of three houses, later shops, they are in limestone, and have quoins, and a tile roof with coped verges on kneelers. They have two storeys and are in three parts. The left part has three bays, with the right bay canted. The ground floor contains a blocked doorway with an inserted window, a shop window, and a doorway with a rectangular fanlight, and in the upper floor are sash windows. The middle part has three bays, and has a central doorway and window under a cornice, sash windows in the outer bays, and above the doorway is an inscribed oval plaque. The right part has one bay and contains a doorway and a casement window.	II
The Old Vicarage; 53.09536°N 1.80363°W	—	Late 18th century	The former vicarage, later a private house, is in limestone, with rusticated quoins and a hipped roof. There are two storeys, and an L-shaped plan, with a south front of five bays, an east front of three bays, and a low extension to the right. The doorway has a moulded surround and a cornice, the windows are sashes, and there is a French window.	II
Green Farmhouse; 53.09955°N 1.80799°W		1823	A stone farmhouse with a tile roof, two storeys, three bays, and a lean-to extension on the right. Above the doorway is a datestone, and the windows are casements, those in the right bay with mullions.	II
Chapel Cottage and Dove Cottage, Milldale; 53.09012°N 1.79333°W		Early 19th century	A pair of cottages in limestone with a tile roof, two storeys and three bays. There are two doorways, the doorway to the left with a moulded cornice, and the windows are mullioned with two lights and hood moulds.	II
Fynderne House; 53.09765°N 1.80543°W	—	Early 19th century	A row of houses in limestone with tile roofs. They have two storeys, and are in four parts, each part recessed from the right. The right part is a house with three bays, and a low extension to the right. The central doorway has an oblong fanlight and a moulded bracketed hood, the windows in the main block are sashes, and in the extension is a casement window. To the left is a cottage with two bays, top opening windows, and a continuous hood mould over the doorway and ground floor window. To the left is another cottage with two bays and casement windows, and at the far left is a former coach house, with one bay and a carriage arch.	II
Harecops; 53.12470°N 1.83018°W	—	Early 19th century	A stone farmhouse on a plinth, with an eaves cornice, rusticated quoins, and a tile roof with coped verges on kneelers. There are two storeys and three bays. The central round-headed doorway has a reeded surround and a fanlight, and the windows are sashes.	II
Milepost northwest of Gateham Grange; 53.12183°N 1.84098°W	—	Early 19th century	The milepost is in cast iron, and has a triangular section and a sloping top. On the top is "Alstonefield" and on the sides are the distances to Warslow, Leek, Alstonefield, and Ashbourne.	II
Milepost northeast of Gateham Grange; 53.11058°N 1.82696°W	—	Early 19th century	The milepost is in cast iron, and has a triangular section and a sloping top. On the top is "Alstonefield" and on the sides are the distances to Warslow, Leek, Alstonefield, and Ashbourne.	II
Milepost northwest of The Hollows; 53.10098°N 1.81055°W		Early 19th century	The milepost is in cast iron, and has a triangular section and a sloping top. On the top is "Alstonefield" and on the sides are the distances to Warslow, Leek, Alstonefield, and Ashbourne.	II
Milepost southeast of Lode House; 53.09578°N 1.79059°W		Early 19th century	The milepost is in cast iron, and has a triangular section and a sloping top. On the top is "Alstonefield" and on the sides are the distances to Warslow, Leek, Alstonefield, and Ashbourne.	II
Rest Cottage; 53.09693°N 1.80689°W	—	Early 19th century	The cottage, at the west of a row of three dwellings, is in limestone, with a moulded eaves course, and a tile roof with coped verges on kneelers. There are two storeys and two bays. The doorway in the left bay has a moulded architrave, an oblong fanlight and a hood, and the windows are sashes.	II
Sunnyside; 53.09696°N 1.80652°W	—	Early 19th century	The cottage, at the east of a row of three dwellings, is in limestone, and has a tile roof with coped verges on kneelers. There are two storeys and an attic, and two bays. The central doorway has a hood, and the windows are casements.	II
The Cottage; 53.09711°N 1.80541°W	—	Early 19th century	The cottage is in limestone, and has a tile roof with coped verges on kneelers. There are two storeys and an attic, and one bay. The windows are mullioned with hood moulds, and the doorway to the right has a bracketed hood.	II
The Cottage Studio; 53.09710°N 1.80545°W	—	Early 19th century	Two cottages, later combined unto one, the building is in limestone, and has a tile roof with coped verges on kneelers. There are two storeys, and it contains two doorways, a window with a hood mould in the ground floor, and two windows in the upper floor; all the windows are casements.	II
Beresford Cottage; 53.09940°N 1.80834°W	—	Early to mid-19th century	The cottage is in limestone, and has a tile roof with coped verges. There are two storeys and two bays. In the centre is a doorway, in the right bay are twp sash windows, the left bay contains a small fixed window, and there is a skylight.	II
Beresford House; 53.09935°N 1.80818°W	—	Early to mid-19th century	A farmhouse in limestone, it has rusticated quoins, and a tile roof with coped verges. There are two storeys and two bays. The windows are sashes, and have lintels grooved as voussoirs, those in the lower floor also with fluted keystones and hood moulds. To the left is a single-storey porch with a cambered arch, and to the right are two extensions.	II
Greenside Cottage and railings 53.09925°N 1.80798°W	—	Early to mid-19th century	The cottage is in limestone, and has a tile roof with coped verges. There are two storeys and an attic, and one bay. The windows are sashes, and around the ground floor window are cast iron railings with fleur-de-lys heads.	II
Lode Mill House; 53.09341°N 1.78360°W	—	Early to mid-19th century	The house is in limestone with quoins, and has a tile roof with coped verges. There are two storeys and three bays. The central doorway has a flat hood, and the windows are sashes.	II
Stoneleigh, railings, gate and piers 53.09932°N 1.80869°W	—	Early to mid-19th century	The house is in limestone with rusticated quoins, and has a tile roof with coped verges. There are two storeys, two parallel ranges, and a front of three bays. The central doorway has an oblong fanlight and a flat bracketed hood, and the windows are sashes. The lintels of the doorway and windows are lined as voussoirs. The front garden is enclosed by cast iron railings and a gate, and there are square gate and end piers.	II
Bill Family Memorial; 53.09523°N 1.80269°W	—	c. 1850	The memorial is in the churchyard of St Peter's Church, and is to the memory of members of the Bill family. It is in stone, and consists of a chest tomb with panelled sides, a moulded base and cornice, and a stepped cap surmounted by statue of a female figure on a cylindrical column. This is surrounded and covered by a canopy with round-arched open sides, a moulded cornice, and a concave-sided cap with a finial, and it is enclosed by cast iron railings and a gate.	II
East View; 53.09911°N 1.80804°W	—	Mid-19th century	The house is in limestone, and has a tile roof with coped verges. There are two storeys and two bays. On the front is a gabled porch, the windows are sashes, and there is a fire window in the west gable end.	II
Stable and granary, Green Farm; 53.09970°N 1.80872°W	—	Mid-19th century	The stable and granary are in limestone, and have a tile roof with coped verges on kneelers. There are two storeys, and an L-shaped plan, with a main range of two bays and a rear wing. In the ground floor are a door and a window, the upper floor contains two loft openings, and there are external steps on the right gable end.	II
Former wash house and pigsty, Greenside Cottage; 53.09919°N 1.80796°W	—	Mid-19th century	The building is in stone with a slate roof, and has two storeys and one bay. The pigsty occupied the ground level, with a door on the left, and the wash house was above with a fixed window, and it was entered from the gable end.	II
Lode Close and outbuilding 53.09795°N 1.79669°W	—	Mid-19th century	The house was remodelled, incorporating earlier material. The buildings are in limestone, and have quoins, and tile roofs with coped verges. The house has two storeys and an attic, and two bays, and contains a central doorway with a hood mould and sash windows. The attached outbuilding has a loft opening and a ventilation slit.	II
Lode Cottage and wall 53.09803°N 1.79661°W	—	Mid-19th century	The cottage is in limestone, with quoins and a tile roof. There are two storeys, two bays, and a low lean-to extension to the right. One window is top opening, and the others are sashes. To the left of the cottage is a coped wall about 3 yards (2.7 m) long containing a doorway.	II
Lode House; 53.09641°N 1.79094°W	—	Mid-19th century	The farmhouse is in stone with quoins, and has a tile roof with coped verges. There are two storeys and an attic, and three bays. The central doorway has a narrow fanlight and a bracketed hood, and the windows are sashes with hood moulds.	II
Lode Mill; 53.09294°N 1.78350°W		Mid-19th century	The former watermill and granary are in limestone with quoins, and have tile roofs with coped verges. The mill has two storeys and four bays, and the lower granary to the right has two storeys and one bay. In the mill are three doorways and casement windows with segmental heads, those in the ground floor with hood moulds. The granary contains a doorway and a square window, and at the rear is an external undershot water wheel.	II
Narrowdale Farm; 53.11413°N 1.81560°W	—	Mid-19th century	The house is in stone with rusticated quoins, and it has a tile roof with coped verges on kneelers. There are two storeys and two bays. The doorway has a bracketed hood, and the windows are sashes.	II
Granary, stable and cartshed, Narrowdale Farm; 53.11447°N 1.81543°W	—	Mid-19th century	The building is in limestone, and has a tile roof with raised coped verges on kneelers. There are two storeys and four bays. To the left is a cart entrance with a massive lintel, in the centre are two doorways, one with a moulded lintel, and to the right is a granary doorway in the upper storey approached by external steps. The windows are casements.	II
Priory Farm, Narrowdale; 53.11437°N 1.81509°W	—	Mid-19th century	The farmhouse is in stone with rusticated quoins, and it has a slate roof with coped verges on kneelers. There are two storeys, two parallel ranges, and a front of three bays. The central doorway has a bracketed cornice hood, and the windows are sashes, those in the ground floor with hood moulds. The lintels of the doorway and windows are grooved as voussoirs, and they have fluted keystones.	II
Former coach house and stables, The George Inn; 53.09747°N 1.80559°W		Mid-19th century	The former coach house and stables, which also provided accommodation for grooms, is in limestone with quoins, and has a tile roof with coped verges. There are two storeys and four bays. The building contains sash windows, fixed windows, a pair of blocked coach entries with inserted casements, and doorways. A flight of external steps leads up to a doorway on the left, and another flight to a doorway in the right gable end.	II
The Hollow; 53.10020°N 1.80895°W	—	Mid-19th century	The house is in limestone with rusticated quoins, and has a tile roof with coped verges on kneelers. There are two storeys and three bays. The central doorway has an oblong fanlight and a bracketed cornice hood, and the windows are casements. The lintels of the doorway and windows are grooved as voussoirs, and they have fluted keystones.	II
The Coach House; 53.09908°N 1.80821°W	—	Mid-19th century	The former coach house and service wing, later a private house, are in stone and have tile roofs with coped verges. There are two storeys, and both parts contain sash windows. The coach house to the left has two bays and contains a carriage arch with a segmental head and a raised keystone. The service wing, at an angle to the right, has one bay and a doorway.	II
Former cottage, stables, cartshed, wash house, privy and dovecote, Dud View Farm; 53.08558°N 1.81166°W	—	1884	The buildings are in limestone with quoins, and they have a tile roof with coped verges. They form a single range with an extension to the rear. The wash house is to the south, the cottage to the north, and the stables and cartshed are in the centre. There are two storeys, and they contain carriage and other doors. The cottage and wash house have sash windows, there is a datestone in the centre, and a loft opening above it. In the extension is the privy, with a dovecote opening above.	II
Tower House; 53.12753°N 1.81029°W	—	1905	The building in the grounds of the former Beresford Hall, which incorporates earlier material, is in stone with quoins, and has a tile roof with a parapet and gables containing weatherboarding. There are three storeys, an L-shaped plan, and one bay. The windows are mullioned, and the doorway, which is approached by a flight of stone steps, has a moulded surround.	II
Term north of Beresford Cottage; 53.12661°N 1.81097°W	—	Early 20th century	The term is in the grounds of the former Beresford Hall. It is in concrete and consists of a female figure in Classical clothing holding a horn of plenty standing on a pedestal.	II
