= St Peter's Church, Alstonefield =

Church in Alstonefield, Staffordshire, England

Coordinates: 53.09527°N 1.80336°W

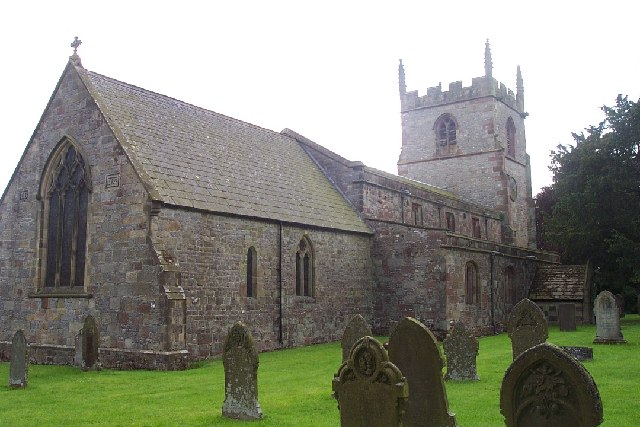
The church in 2005

The Church of St Peter in Alstonefield, Staffordshire Moorlands, England is a grade I listed Anglican parish church. The oldest parts are 12th century; it has been extended and refurbished in the 16th, 17th, and 18th centuries and in 1870. Anglo-Saxon crosses found on the site, and the dedication to St Peter, support the belief that there was an earlier Saxon church on the site.

In the churchyard is a memorial stone to Ann Green, who died 11 April 1518. This is believed to be the oldest legible gravestone in England. The stone is circular in shape, with wording carved on the edge and on one flat surface.

In 2010 lead worth £14,000 was stolen from the church roof. Fund-raising to replace it led to the now annual Leaden Boot Challenge, a 26.2 miles (42.2 km) walk or run to be completed within 12 hours, which now raises funds for other local causes.

The church is in the Deanery of Alstonefield and the Diocese of Lichfield.

== See also ==
- Grade I listed churches in Staffordshire
- Listed buildings in Alstonefield
