= Trentham Mausoleum =

Grade I listed mausoleum in Stoke-on-Trent, England

Coordinates: 52.9668°N 2.1979°W

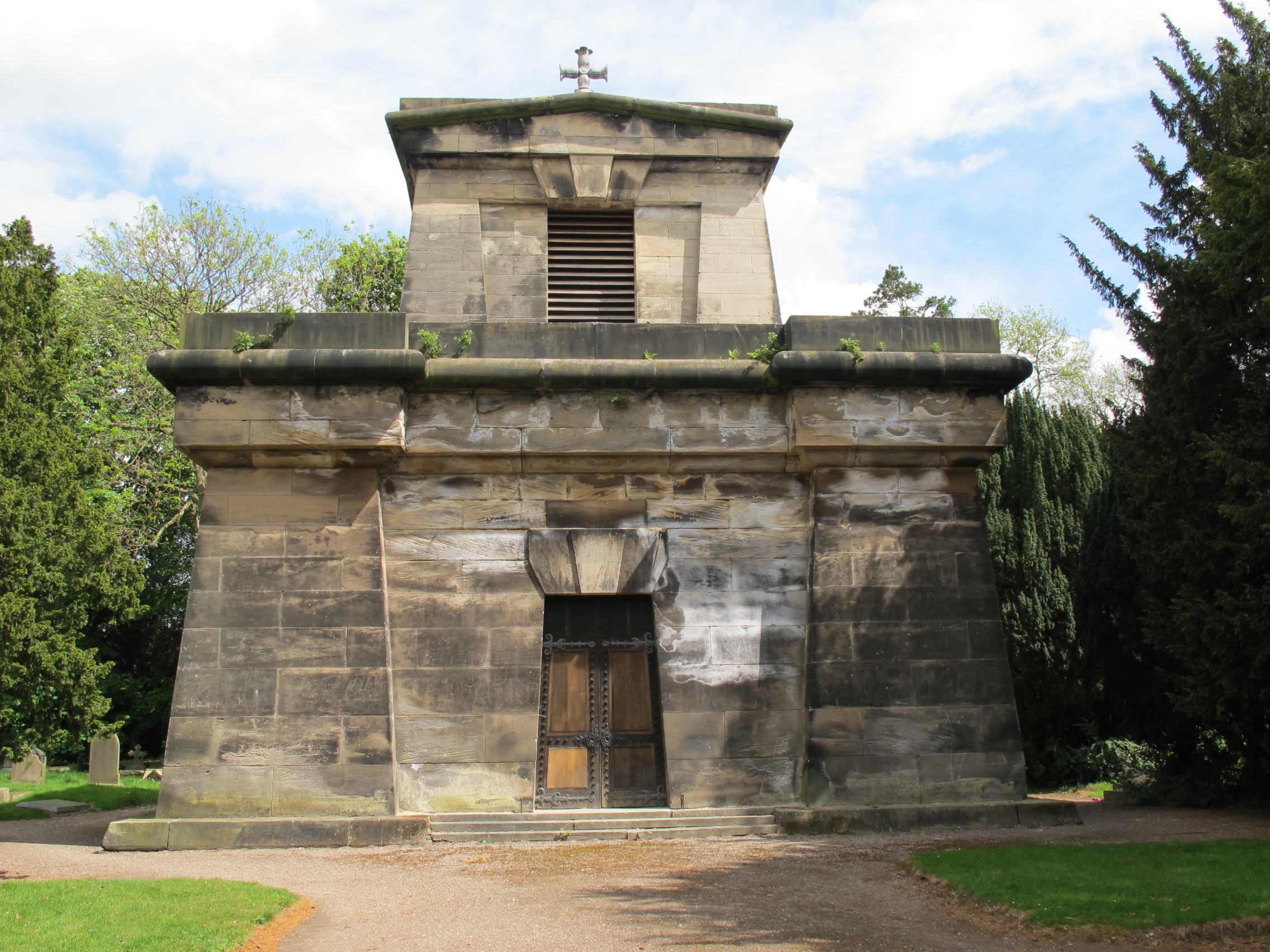
- Interactive map of the Trentham Mausoleum area
- Alternative names: Sutherland Mausoleum

General information
- Type: Mausoleum
- Architectural style: Neo-classical, Egyptian Revival
- Location: Trentham, Stoke-on-Trent, England
- Construction started: 1807
- Completed: 1808
- Client: George Leveson-Gower, 1st Duke of Sutherland
- Owner: Stoke-on-Trent City Council

Technical details
- Material: Ashlar stone

Design and construction
- Architect: Charles Heathcote Tatham
- Designations: Grade I listed

The Trentham Mausoleum is a Grade I listed mausoleum in Trentham, Stoke-on-Trent, built as the final resting place of the Dukes of Sutherland from the Leveson-Gower family.

== History ==
The mausoleum was built in 1807–08 for George Leveson-Gower, the 2nd Marquess of Stafford and later 1st Duke of Sutherland by architect Charles Heathcote Tatham. Heathcote Tatham was a friend of Elizabeth, the Duke's wife, and along with his commission he constructed several buildings, including a lodge and bridges, at the nearby Trentham Hall.

== Architecture ==
The mausoleum is constructed in ashlar in a neo-classical style with Egyptian details. The corners of the building feature striped Graeco-Egyptian pylon-like structures, which may have been influenced by Heathcote Tatum's time in Paris, where the style was particularly popular in the late 18th century. The entrance doorway is relatively small with doors decorated in highly ornate wrought-iron work and a heavy stone lintel. The mausoleum is surmounted by a small tower, with louvred windows and a pyramidal roof.

Above the doorway is the family coat of arms and the inscription "MDCCCVIII", signifying the completion date of 1808.

== Conservation ==
The condition of the building has given cause for concern, and although some urgent repairs have been completed, as of 2021 it is on the Heritage at Risk Register.

== See also ==
- Grade I listed buildings in Staffordshire
