= Erasmus Darwin House =

Historic house museum in Lichfield, England

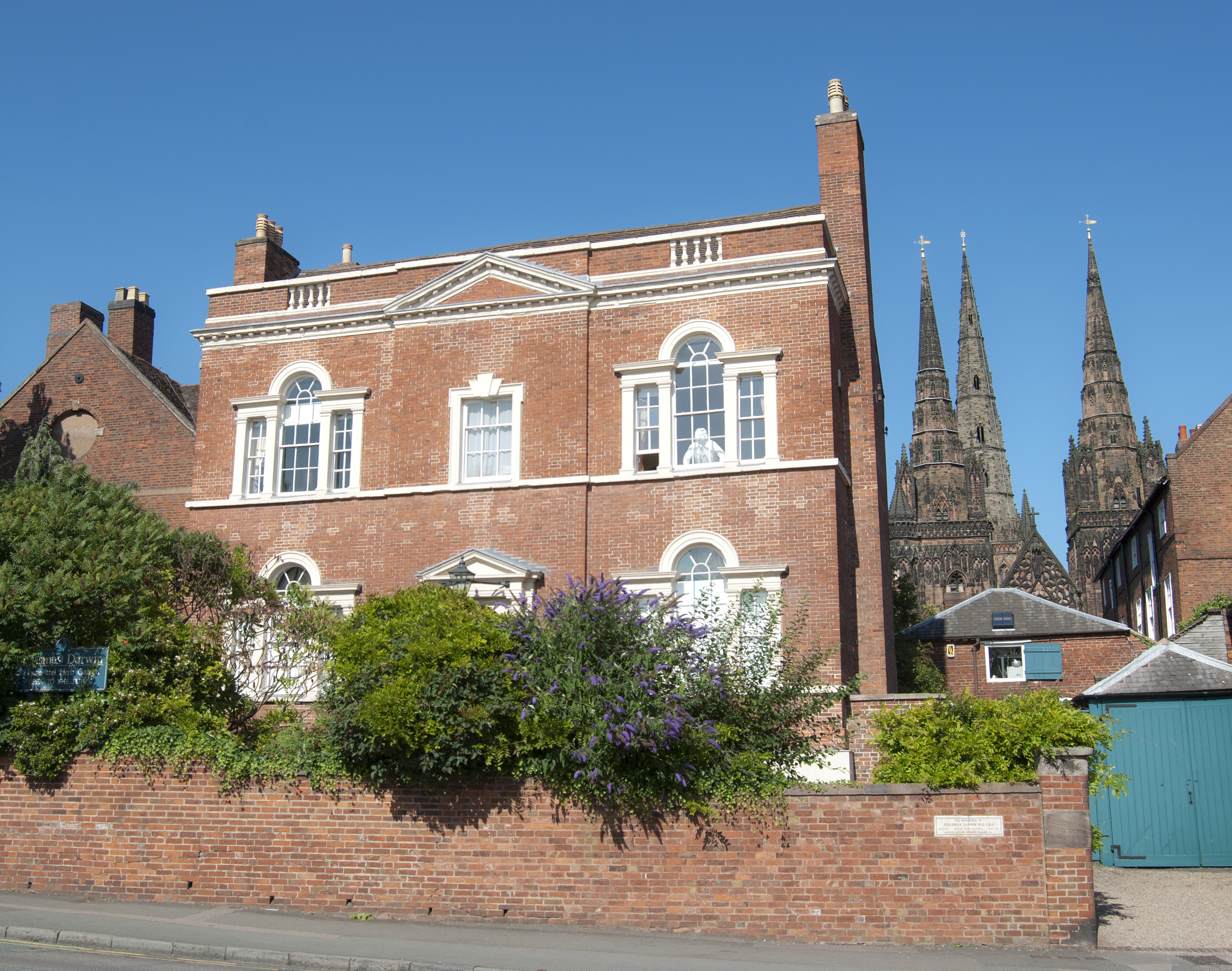
- Front of the house

General information
- Location: Beacon Street, Lichfield, Staffordshire, England
- Coordinates: 52°41′7.25″N 1°49′59.25″W

Website
- www.erasmusdarwin.org

Erasmus Darwin House in Lichfield, Staffordshire, is the former home of the English poet and physician Erasmus Darwin, grandfather of naturalist Charles Darwin. The house is a Grade I listed building, and is now a writer's house museum commemorating Erasmus Darwin's life.

Erasmus Darwin was a physician, scientist, inventor, poet, and educationalist, and lived on Beacon Street from 1758 until 1781. A founding member of the Lunar Society, it was here that he received many notable 18th-century personalities, including Josiah Wedgwood, Matthew Boulton, Benjamin Franklin and James Watt.

== History of the house ==
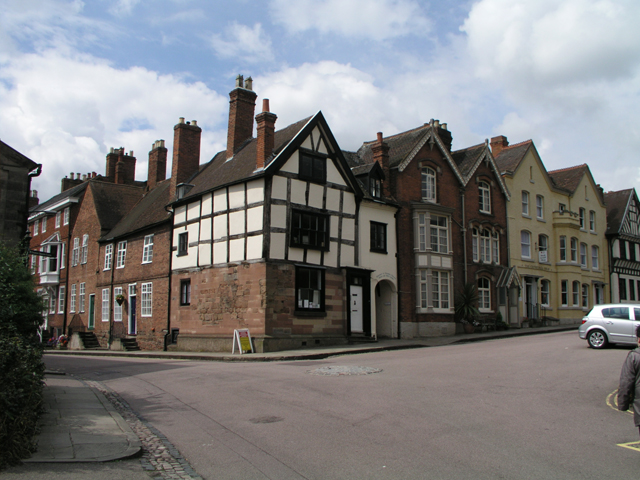
The entrance to the house and herb garden from Cathedral Close

Darwin purchased a medieval half-timbered building on the west side of the lower courtyard of the Vicars Choral in 1758. From 1758 to 1759 Darwin converted the building into a large Georgian town house of red brick with stucco dressings and Venetian windows. At this time the front of the house was separated from Beacon Street by a narrow deep ditch which once formed the moat of the Cathedral Close. Darwin built a bridge across the ditch descending from his hall door to the street. The ditch was overgrown with tangled bushes, which Darwin cleared and made a terrace on the bank. He planted the ditch with lilacs and rose bushes which screened his terrace from passersby. After Darwin left in 1781 the next owner filled in the ditch to make a driveway from the street to his doorway.

== Erasmus Darwin at home in Lichfield ==
After the Darwins moved into the new front of their house, a wooden bridge was thrown across the ditch and a twin-tier terrace was built, causing alterations to be made to the basement windows.

For 20 years this house was the base for Darwin's medical practice, for his scientific experiments, meetings of the Lunar Society, and such inventive schemes as the construction of the Trent and Mersey Canal. Amid all this, the house was also the centre of family life.

== Events and exhibits ==
Erasmus Darwin House recently relaunched two exhibition rooms, with audio and visual interactives.

The house is also involved in the Lichfield festival and the annual medieval market.

Heritage weekend has the museum open to the public for free and cellar tours are also available.

The parlour has been recently restored and now holds an antique grandfather clock. The room also includes armchairs with headphones where you can listen to Erasmus Darwin's poetry and ideas of evolution.

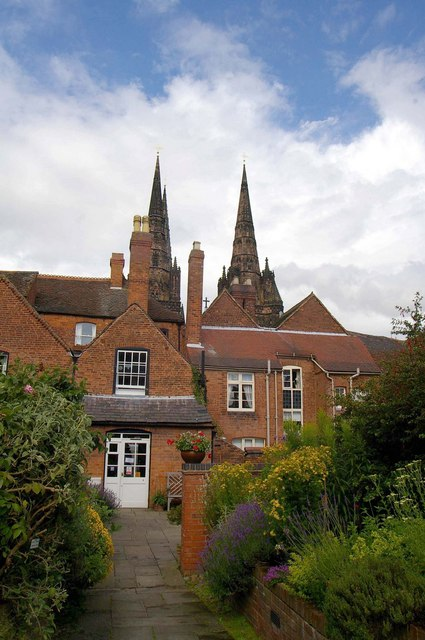
Herb garden

The Georgian herb garden has been restored with plantings of the period and a relief sculpture of Erasmus Darwin and incised text on paving slabs, created by Denis Parsons.

== Museum today ==
Erasmus Darwin House is run by a charitable foundation and relies on public donations.

The cellar is usually open to visitors via guided tours on the first and third Saturdays of each month.

Erasmus Darwin House is available for events.

== See also ==
- Grade I listed buildings in Staffordshire
- Listed buildings in Lichfield
