= Essex Bridge, Staffordshire =

Bridge in Staffordshire, England

Coordinates: 52°48′03″N 2°00′31″W

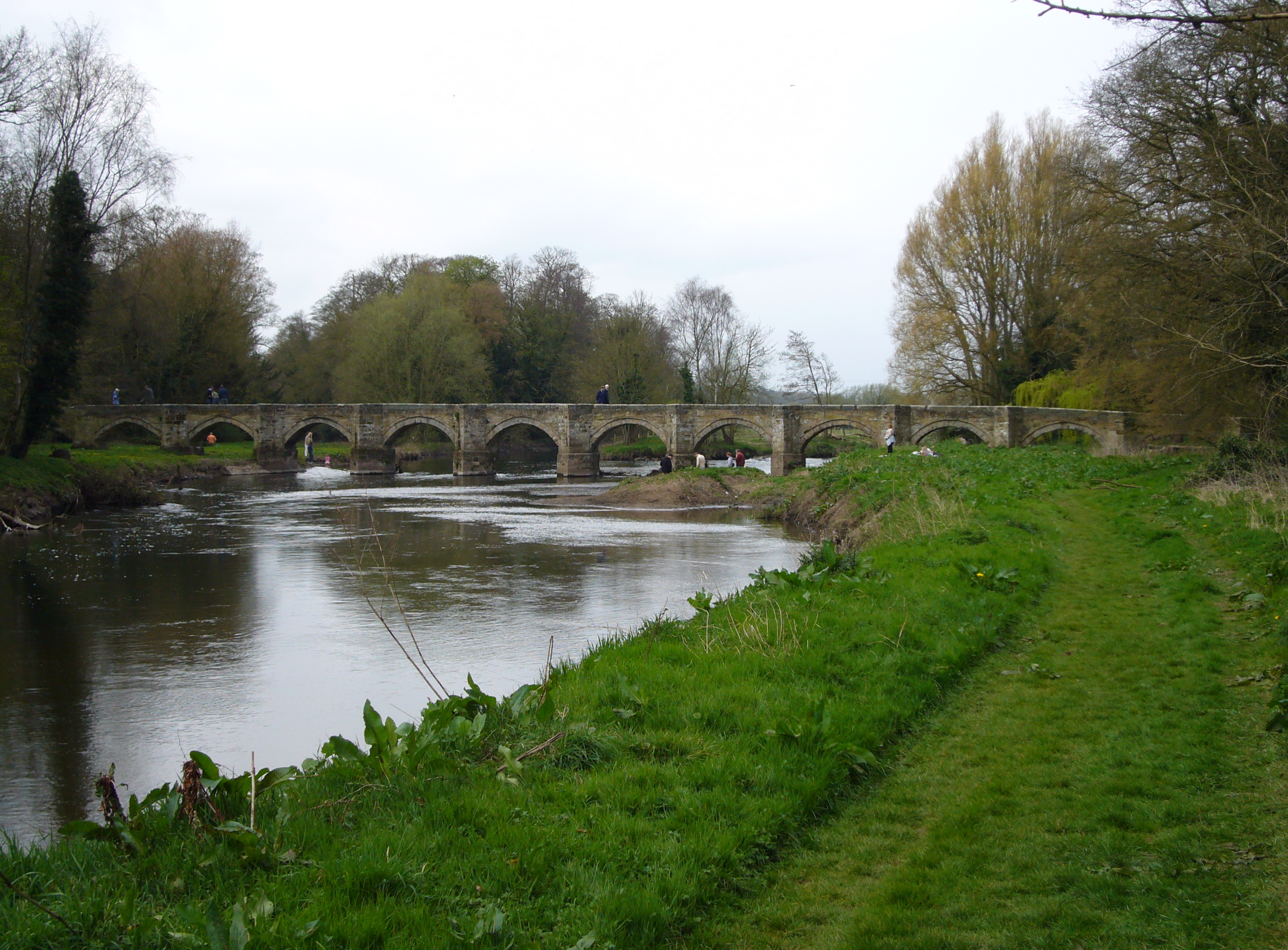
Essex Bridge

Essex Bridge (grid reference SJ995225) is a Grade I listed packhorse bridge over the River Trent near Great Haywood, Staffordshire, England.

Spanning the Trent 100 metres downstream of its confluence with the River Sow, it was built in the late sixteenth century by the Earl of Essex, a favourite of Queen Elizabeth I. The Earl lived nearby at Chartley Castle. It is now the longest remaining packhorse bridge in England with fourteen of its original forty round span arches left, and has been described as "perhaps the least altered old bridge in the county"

The bridge carries the long-distance footpath The Staffordshire Way over the River Trent, linking the Trent and Mersey Canal tow-path with the bridleway through the Shugborough estate to Cannock Chase.

The bridge is also a scheduled monument.

== See also ==
- List of Grade I listed buildings in Staffordshire
- List of crossings of the River Trent
- Listed buildings in Colwich, Staffordshire
