= Mayfield, Staffordshire =

Coordinates: 53.0065°N 1.7685°W

Mayfield
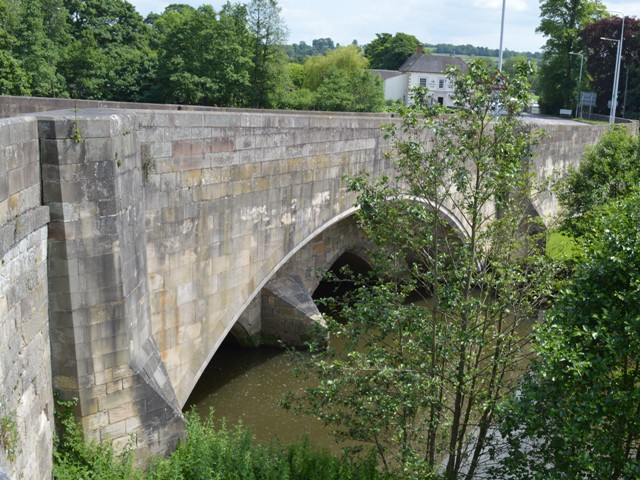
- Hanging Mill Bridge, Mayfield

- Location within Staffordshire
- Population: 2,000
- OS grid reference: SK154448
- District: East Staffordshire
- Shire county: Staffordshire
- Region: West Midlands
- Country: England
- Sovereign state: United Kingdom
- Post town: ASHBOURNE
- Postcode district: DE6 3
- Police: Staffordshire
- Fire: Staffordshire
- Ambulance: West Midlands
- UK Parliament: Burton

Mayfield is a village on the outskirts of Ashbourne in Derbyshire, about 9 miles from Uttoxeter, situated in East Staffordshire.

The village is divided into Mayfield, Church Mayfield, Lower Mayfield, Upper Mayfield and Middle Mayfield. It has a population of approximately 2000. It lies on the banks of the River Dove. The Dove is the boundary between Derbyshire and Staffordshire. Mayfield is on the Staffordshire side of the border but it has an Ashbourne postal address because its nearest postal town, Ashbourne, is in Derbyshire. Derbyshire is not used by Royal Mail.

== History ==
Mayfield was mentioned in the Domesday Book, in which it was called 'Mavreveldt'. The surname likely derives from Old English mæþel "speech, assembly, meeting" and feld "field".

It was the scene of a siege during the retreat of Bonnie Prince Charlie, whose followers terrorised the local villagers forcing them to take refuge in John the Baptist's church. Several musket ball holes, reputedly from weapons fired during the siege, can still be seen in one of the doors of the church.

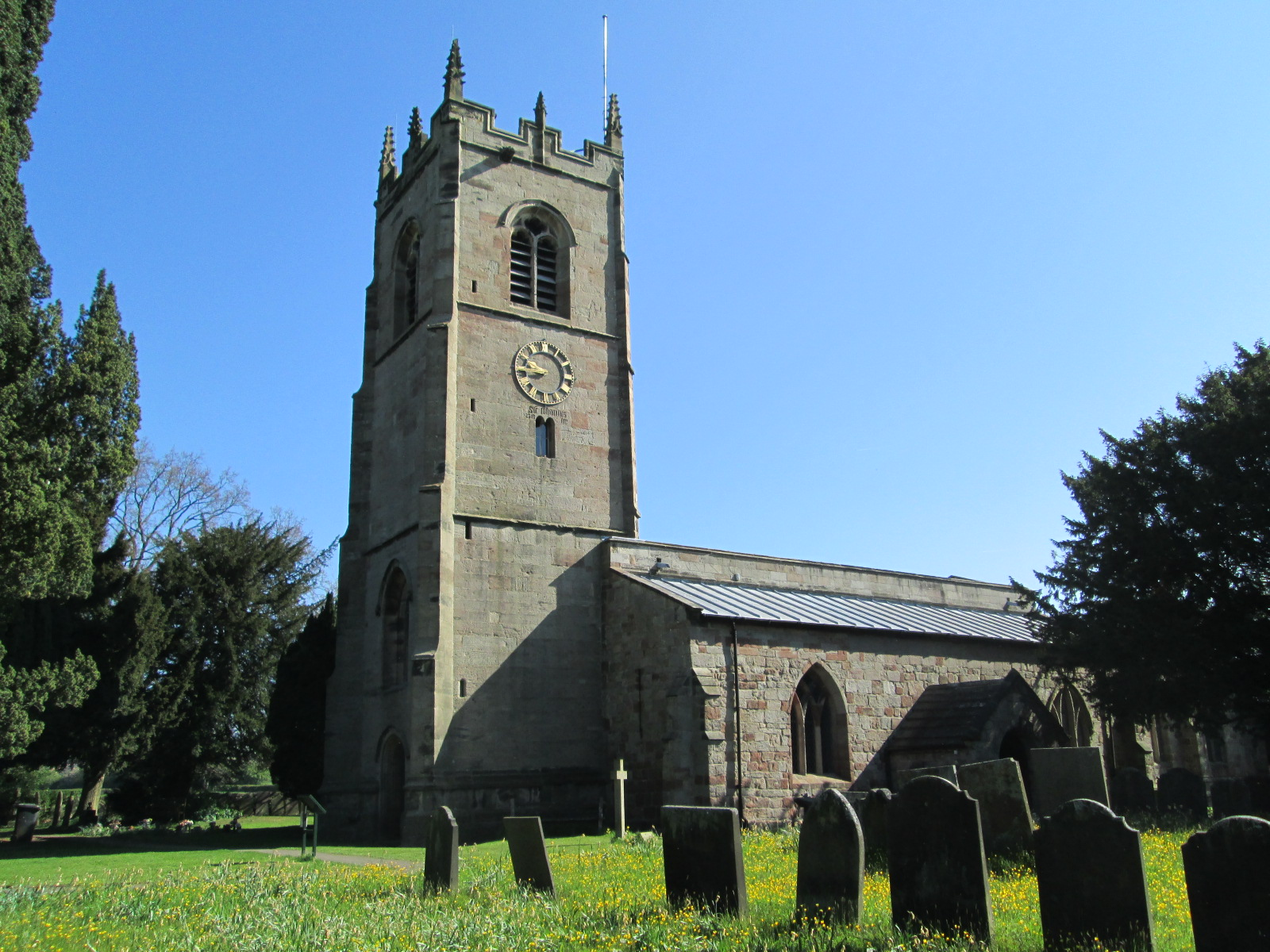
St John the Baptist's Church

There has been a church in Mayfield for over a thousand years. The Domesday Survey of 1086 recorded a priest in Mayfield, one of only twenty-five priests recorded for the county of Staffordshire. There is now no trace of the original Church, which would have been a Saxon wooden building standing on or near to the site of the present church. The Saxon church was replaced during the reign of Henry I by a Norman stone building in about 1125. The church was extended in the 15 and 16th Centuries, with the tower being built in 1515. The final extension was in 1854.

On 13 June 1944 a Royal Air Force Vickers Wellington (LP397) from RAF Castle Donington was on a cross country exercise. 25 minutes later the aircraft entered a thuderstorm shortly after the aircraft went into a nose dive & crashed near the village. All Six of the bomber crew died in the crash.

== Economy ==
Mayfield's mill, in one form or another, has been standing on the banks of the Dove since the 12th Century. Today Mayfield Yarns produces warped and twisted yarns. The parish is also home to several farms.

== School ==
Henry Prince First School in Mayfield shut down in summer 2019.

== Local customs ==
Every summer Mayfield continues the well dressing tradition where wells and springs are decorated with tableaux created by pressing flower petals into clay. The first Well Dressing festival in Mayfield was held in 1896.

The preparation of the boards takes several days. Clay is spread over the wet boards then the outline of the design pricked out with coffee beans. "Petalling" follows and finally the boards are erected by the wells. The wells are blessed by local clergy (Church of England, Catholic and Methodist) and remain for a week for people to view.

== Local groups ==
There is a thriving scout group that opened in 2015. The group takes children from the Village and surrounding areas and is run by volunteers.

Mayfield Panthers is the football club and caters for all ages through both Summer and Winter Leagues.

Mayfield Heritage Group aims to promote and protect heritage and history in and around Mayfield.

The Mayfield Memorial Hall is a charity providing a venue and fundraising events for Mayfield, Ashbourne and surrounding area.

Mayfield Recreational Association (the MRA) provide outdoor and sporting facilities for children, young people and adults in and around Mayfield. They offer a football field, multi-use games area, bowling green, playground and pavilion.

MARNA is a community group formed in 2019 to improve facilities in Mayfield and put on events for children and older people.

Senior Social is a club for the over-sixties in the village.

== Notable residents ==
- William Barton (1598?–1678) an English hymnologist and vicar of Mayfield.
- Thomas Moore (1779-1852) Irish writer, poet and lyricist. His daughter, Olivia Byron Moore, is buried in the Mayfield churchyard
- Sir Bertram Windle FRS, FSA, (1858 in Mayfield Vicarage – 1929) a British anatomist, administrator, archaeologist, scientist, educationalist, writer and vitalist

== See also ==
- Listed buildings in Mayfield, Staffordshire
