= Broughton Hall, Staffordshire =

16th-century Elizabethan manor house in England

Broughton Hall
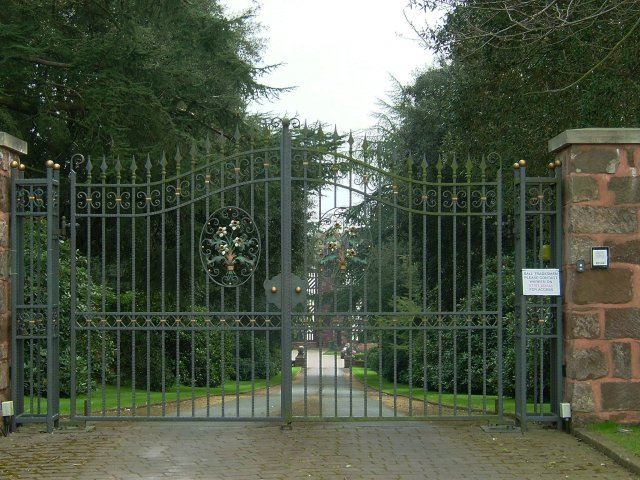
- The Gates of Broughton Hall

- Location within Staffordshire

General information
- Coordinates: 52.9021°N 2.3483°W
- Construction started: Mid-16th century
- Owner: John Caudwell

Design and construction
- Designations: Grade I listed building

Broughton Hall near Eccleshall, Staffordshire, is a privately owned 16th-century Elizabethan manor house. It is a Grade I listed building.

The manor of Broughton was owned by the eponymous Broughton family from the 13th century. The present house was built in the mid-16th century in the vernacular black and white timbered style of the Elizabethan period. Later the house was stuccoed.

The building was described in 1608 as, "a very fair house, and well seated, being moated about and a park belonging to it with some store of deer in it".

The estate was sold in 1914 to John Hall, a Midlands industrialist, who extended the property and carried out significant restoration works including the removal of the stucco to reveal the original timbers.

During the 1940s the house served as a school and in 1952 it was donated by the Halls to the nuns of the Franciscan order of St Joseph who cared for the house until it was sold to the present owner John Caudwell who continues renovation and restoration work.

== See also ==
- List of Grade I listed buildings in Staffordshire
- Listed buildings in Eccleshall
