= St John the Baptist's Church, Mayfield =

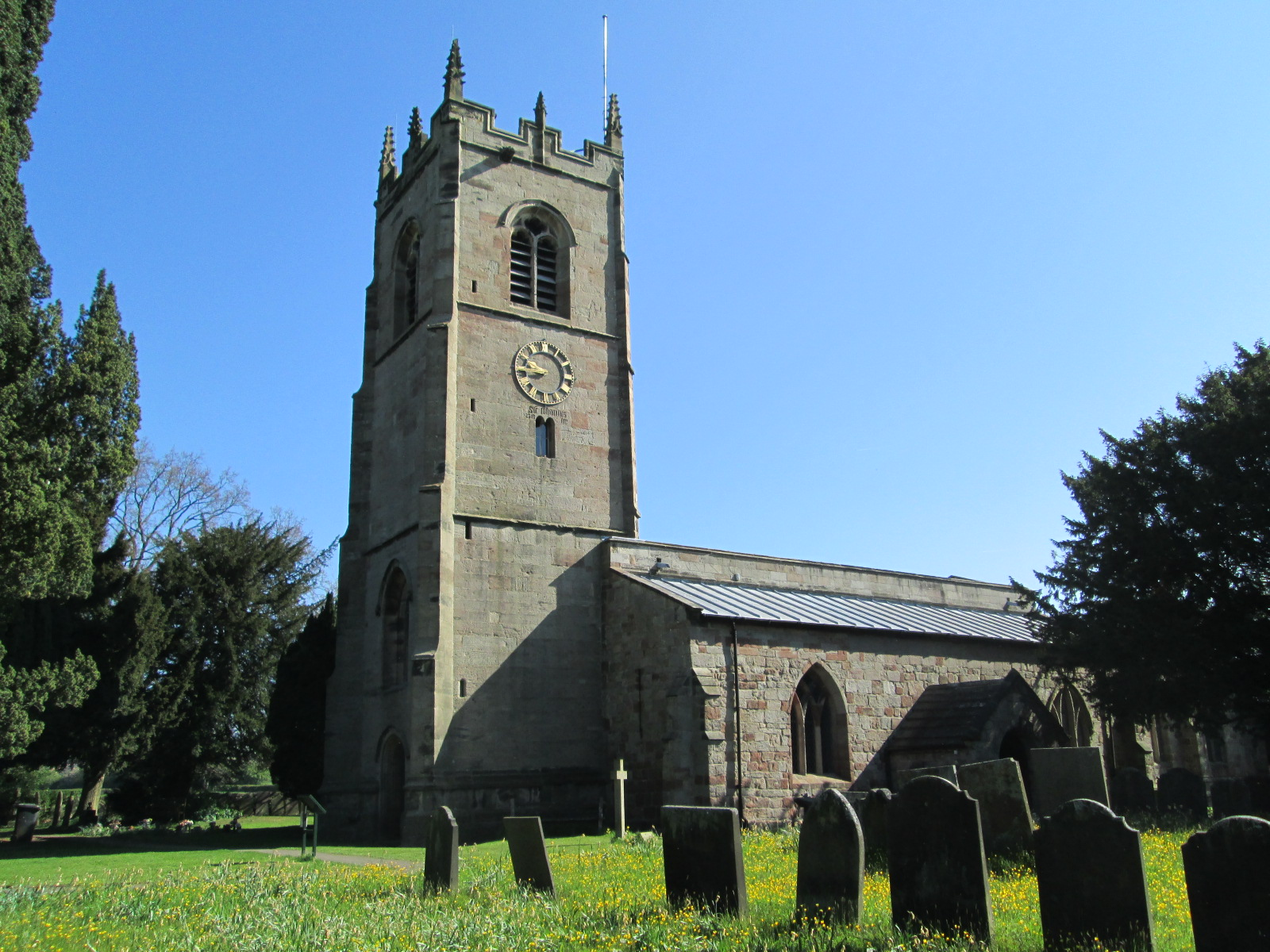
- View from the south
- St John the Baptist's Church, Mayfield
- 53°00′00″N 1°46′18″W
- OS grid reference: SK 154 447
- Location: Mayfield, Staffordshire
- Country: England
- Denomination: Church of England
- Website: http://www.mayfieldparishchurch.org/

Architecture
- Heritage designation: Grade I
- Designated: 12 January 1966

Administration
- Diocese: Diocese of Lichfield
- Deanery: Uttoxeter Deanery

St John the Baptist's Church is an Anglican church in the village of Mayfield, Staffordshire, England. It is a Grade I listed building. The core is a Norman church; it was extended in the early 14th century, and the tower built in 1515.

== History ==
=== Early buildings ===
There was a church in the village in Saxon times; the Domesday book, of 1086, recorded that there was a priest in the village, one of 25 recorded for Staffordshire.

A simple rectangular stone building replaced the Saxon church about 1125. The south doorway (inside the later porch), with a well-preserved Norman arch, dates from this time. The nave, of three bays, is mainly Norman.

=== Extensions in medieval period ===
In the early 14th century the church was extended. The south aisle and the chancel date from this time, also the pointed chancel arch. The chancel, in decorated style, is particularly large and has three bays.

The tower was completed in 1515, built by Thomas Rollestone, Lord of the Manor. It has three stages and diagonal buttresses. On the west face is an inscription: Ainsy et mieulx peult ester ("Thus it is and better could it be").

=== Later modifications ===
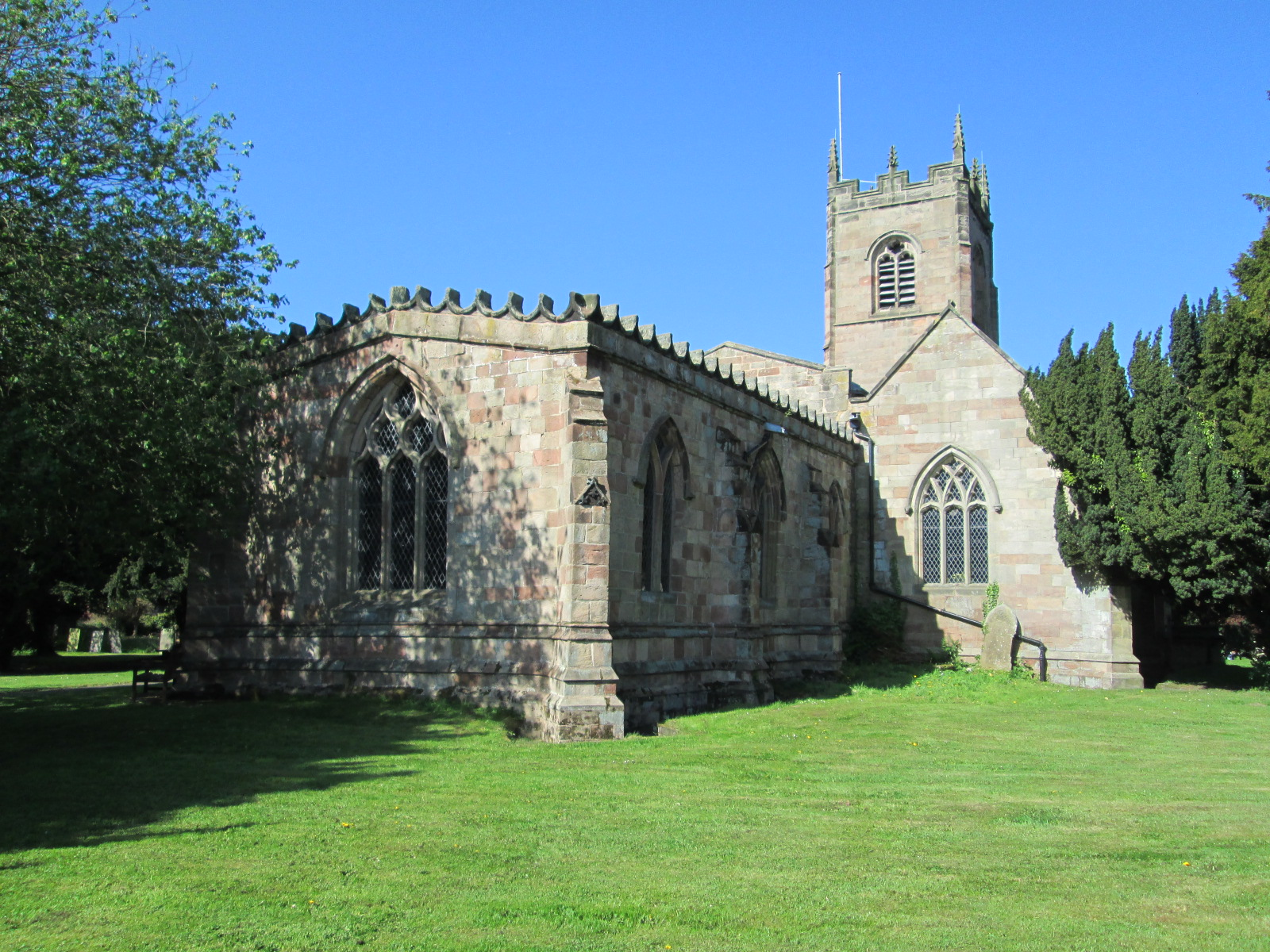
View from the east, showing the chancel and parapet

The south porch was built about 1600, and restored in the 19th century. There is an oak communion rail, of 1660; the oak altar table, brought into the church in 1663 and carving added, is thought to be originally an Elizabethan farmhouse table. The parapet over the chancel dates from the 18th century.

In 1854 there were alterations to provide more free seats. The north aisle was rebuilt; box pews were replaced by bench pews, using timber from the box pews. The number was free seats was increased from 31 to 107. The hexagonal carved oak pulpit, of the 17th century, was moved from the north to the south side of the central aisle. The octagonal stone font, dated 1514, was moved from the south side of the tower base to the left of the south entrance.

=== Bells ===
The church has a ring of six bells; this includes the single bell contemporary with the completion of the tower in 1515. A second bell was added in 1642, and a third in 1864. In 1902 the bells were re-hung with three new bells.

== See also ==
- Grade I listed churches in Staffordshire
- Listed buildings in Mayfield, Staffordshire
