= Alstonefield =

Village in Staffordshire, England

Coordinates: 53.09682°N 1.8077°W

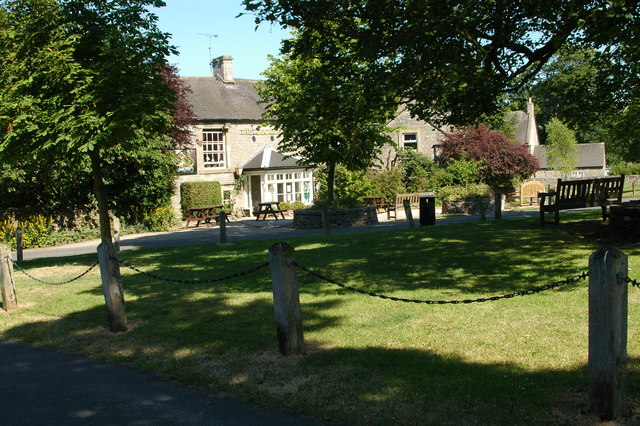
- The George and the village green

- Location within Staffordshire
- Population: 304 (2011)
- OS grid reference: SK130555
- Civil parish: Alstonefield
- District: Staffordshire Moorlands
- Shire county: Staffordshire
- Region: West Midlands
- Country: England
- Sovereign state: United Kingdom
- Post town: ASHBOURNE
- Postcode district: DE6
- Dialling code: 01335
- Police: Staffordshire
- Fire: Staffordshire
- Ambulance: West Midlands
- UK Parliament: Staffordshire Moorlands

Alstonefield (alternative spelling: Alstonfield) is a village and civil parish in the Peak District National Park and the Staffordshire Moorlands district of Staffordshire, England about 7 miles (11 km) north of Ashbourne, 10 miles (16 km) east of Leek and 16 miles (26 km) south of Buxton. The parish had a population of 274 according to the 2001 census, increasing to 304 at the 2011 census.

The village has two pubs; The George and The Watts Russell Arms.

The civil parish also contains the hamlets of Hopedale, Stanshope and Milldale.

In Wilson's 1870–1872 Imperial Gazetteer of England and Wales, the spellings Allstonefield and Allstonfield were used.

The poet and writer Charles Cotton (28 April 1630 – 16 February 1687), best known for translating the work of Michel de Montaigne from the French, for his contributions to The Compleat Angler and for the influential The Compleat Gamester, was born in the village.

== Governance ==
Alstonefield has a parish council, the lowest tier of local government in England. It is within Staffordshire Moorlands non-metropolitan district and the county of Staffordshire, administered by Staffordshire County Council. Alstonefield is in the Parliamentary constituency of Staffordshire Moorlands. Prior to Brexit in 2020 it was part of the European constituency of West Midlands.

== Church ==
The parish church, dedicated to St Peter, is a Grade I listed building with some 12th-century stonework and is believed to be on the site of an Anglo-Saxon church.

== Manor Land Claim 2007 ==
In 2007 Mark Roberts, a businessman involved in the Peterstone Wentloog case, registered a caution against first registration for 25,000 acres (100 km^{2}) after purchasing the Lord of the manor of Alstonefield for £10,000 in 1999. After this case the Law Commission in England and Wales was considering abolishing feudal land law.

== See also ==
- Listed buildings in Alstonefield
