= River Sow =

River in Staffordshire, England

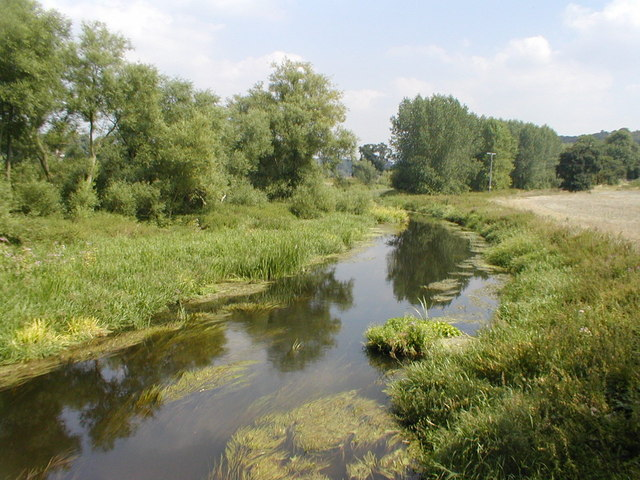
- River Sow near Milford

Location
- Country: United Kingdom
- Country within the UK: England
- Counties: Staffordshire
- Towns: Eccleshall, Stafford
- Villages: Great Bridgeford, Milford, Tixall

Physical characteristics
- Source
  - location: Broughton, Staffordshire
  - coordinates: 52.9006°N 2.3654°W
- Mouth
  - location: Confluence with the Trent near Essex Bridge, Staffordshire
  - coordinates: 52.8008°N 2.0089°W
- Length: 38 km (24 mi)
- Basin size: 601 km^{2} (232 sq mi)
- Discharge
  - location: Milford
  - average: 6.33 m^{3}/s (224 cu ft/s)

Basin features
- Tributaries
  - left: Brockton Brook, Meece Brook
  - right: Doxey Brook, River Penk

The River Sow /saʊ/ is a tributary of the River Trent in Staffordshire, England, and is the river that flows through Stafford.

== Course ==
The river rises to the south of Loggerheads, near Broughton and flows south-east beside the villages of Fairoak, Bishop's Offley and Walk Mill until it reaches Cop Mere. East of the Mere the river is joined by the Brockton Brook before it flows past Eccleshall and its castle. The Sow continues south-east passing Chebsey, where it is joined by the Meece Brook before reaching the mill at Worston and then Little and Great Bridgeford. The river then flows through the nature reserve of Doxey Marshes until it reaches Stafford, where it flows through Victoria park. Beyond the town at Baswich the Sow is joined by its largest tributary the River Penk, it then continues beneath the bridge between Milford and Tixall until it flows through the grounds of Shugborough Hall to meet the Trent near Essex Bridge.

== Navigation ==
Between 1816 and the 1920s, the section between Stafford and Baswich was navigable, and was known as the River Sow Navigation. There are plans to restore it, which are being spearheaded by a community interest company called Stafford Riverway Link.

== Environment ==
The river was tested in 2009 and had pH levels of 7.6. Oxygen saturation levels at the source of the river are 68%. Fish species found in the river include Chub, Roach, Pike and Bream.

== Bibliography ==
- Jones, David J. (June 2006). "Stafford Riverway Link" (PDF). Stafford Riverway Link. Archived from the original (PDF) on 8 March 2019.
