= Leek railway station (Churnet Valley Railway) =

Railway station in Staffordshire, England

Coordinates: 53.0953°N 2.0300°W

Leek
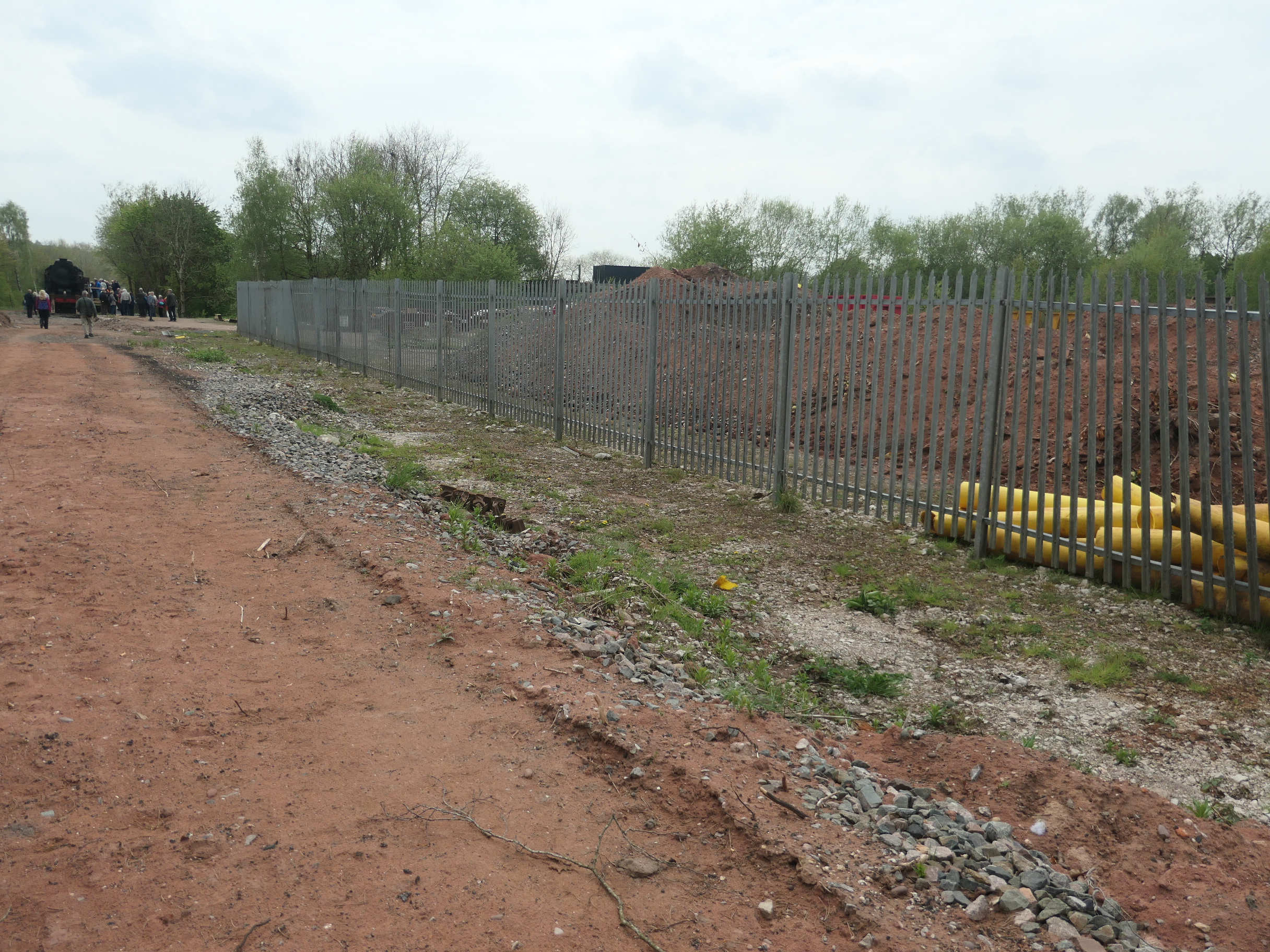
- The station site, prior to construction and opening

General information
- Location: Leek, Staffordshire Moorlands; England
- System: Station on Churnet Valley Railway
- Owner: Churnet Valley Railway
- Platforms: 1
- Train operators: Churnet Valley Railway

Other information
- Status: Open

History
- Opened: 3 December 2024

Key dates
- 2019: Work begins on extension to Leek
- 2021: Works suspended due to Covid-19 pandemic
- 2022: Works resume
- 3 December 2024: First train to station site (non-passenger)
- 31 December 2024: Works finished and station is officially opened
Route map
- Churnet Valley Railway
Location

Leek railway station (Churnet Valley Railway) is the northern terminus of the Churnet Valley Railway serving the market town of Leek in Staffordshire, England. It was opened in 2024 after 30 years of restoring the line between it and Leek Brook.

== History ==
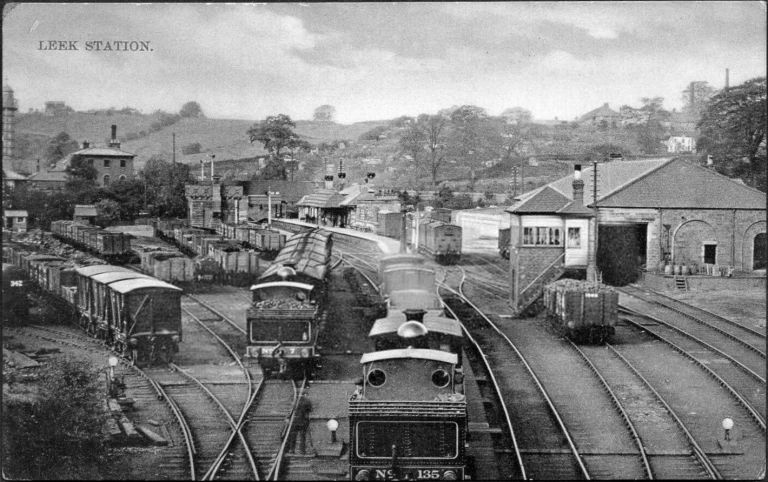
The original station in 1910

=== Original station ===
The original station opened in 1849 by the North Staffordshire Railway on the Churnet Valley Line.

Passenger services through Leek were withdrawn in stages, ceasing entirely in 1965. Freight services ceased in 1970.

== Preservation and reopening of the Churnet Valley Line ==
Plans were first mooted to re-open Leek as a heritage railway as far back as 1970 when services were first curtailed, but following the council's short notice demolition of Leek station and the threat to Cheddleton in 1973, these plans were shelved and efforts concentrated on Cheddleton. The remaining Churnet Valley Line from Oakamoor Sidings to Leek Brook Junction was mothballed in 1988, and taken over by the Churnet Valley Railway in 1996. It has always been stated that the long-term aim was to restore services to Leek eventually.

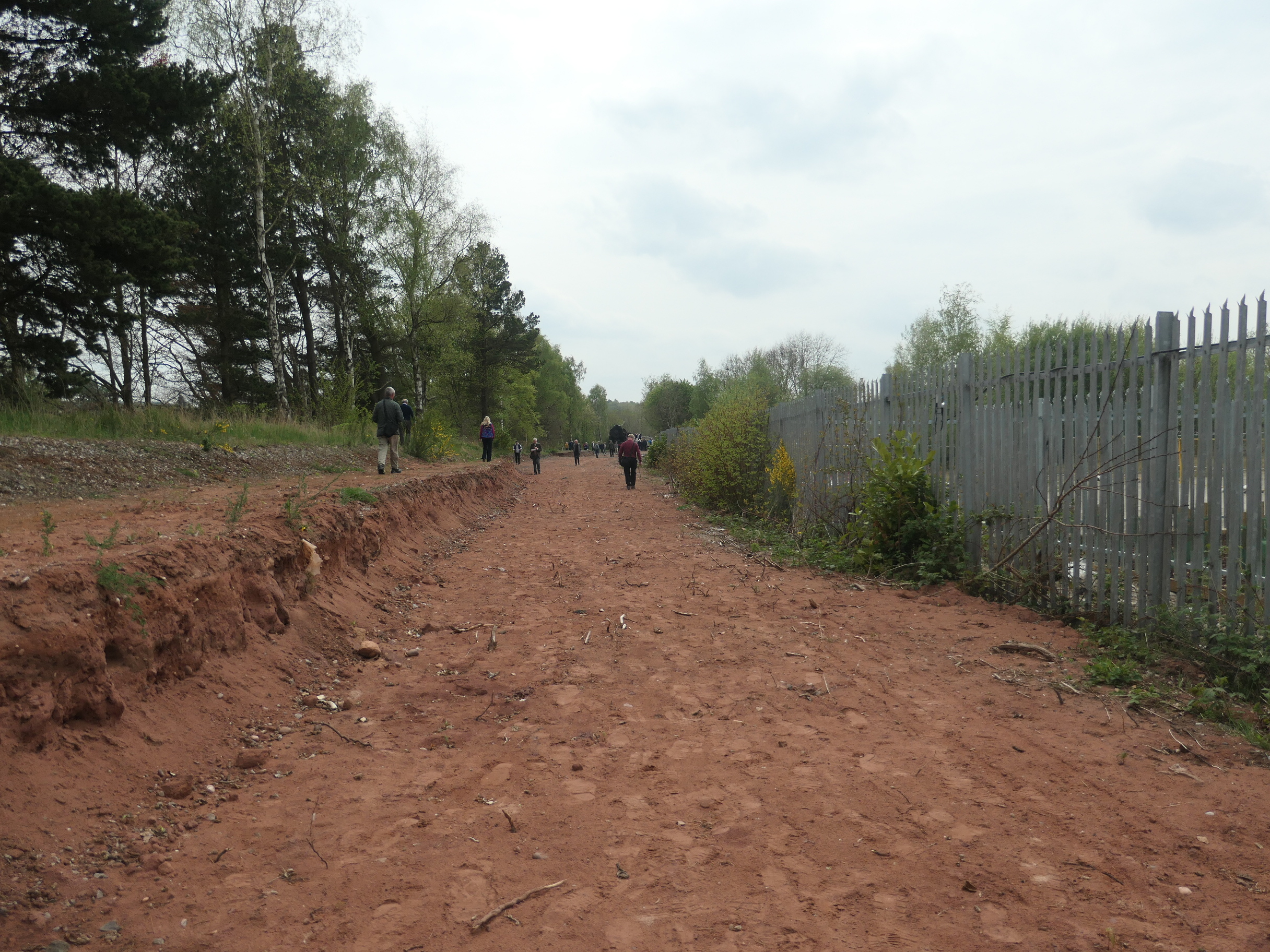
The old railway between Leek and Leekbrook, prior to relaying and works on the railway extension

=== Original Reconnect Leek Project ===
First announced in 2015, an article on the news website StokeSentinel.co.uk. announced efforts by Moorlands & City Railways to reconnect Leek back to the mainline with the article quoted as saying:

Members of Staffordshire Moorlands District Council ruling cabinet last week authorised the submission of a planning application to re-instate the rail line from Leekbrook to Cornhill. Councillors also authorised the negotiation of an agreement to lease the track-bed, owned by the council, to Churnet Valley Railway Trust to enable the construction, operation and management of the line. The district council is also contributing £22,000 from the Moorlands Partnership Board towards preparation of a full planning application; £5,000 to the cost of reinstating Leekbrook Station, which is estimated to cost £25,000 and a further £4,000 towards the cost of repairs to Cheddleton Station, estimated to also be around £25,000. Speaking at the cabinet meeting, council leader, Sybil Ralphs, said: “This report seeks approval to bring forward the project. A lot of people still do not think it will happen. “We have got a very good working relationship with Churnet Valley Railway as it is a success story. It brings in thousands of people to the Staffordshire Moorlands"

In January 2014 Moorlands & City Railways, in collaboration with the Churnet Valley Railway, announced their plans to rebuild this missing section of about 1 mile (1.6 km) between Leekbrook Junction and Leek. Because the former station in Leek is now the site of a Morrisons supermarket, a new station was proposed as outlined in the Staffordshire Moorlands District Council's Masterplan for developing tourism in the area. This includes the proposed redevelopment of the Cornhill area with a new canal marina and railway station planned.

With MCR's planned western extension to Stoke, this new station would have provided an interchange for CVR services, via the Stoke–Leek line, to the national network.

With regards to the actual extension, the project was set up under the title "Reconnect Leek" and the main items of this was:

- Planning request made for 89 new houses at Leek Brook on current brownfield site inside the former triangle
  - Once granted, this land will then be sold to raise funds for the extension of the railway into Leek
- New station at Leek
- Re-instatement of the North-East Curve
- New station at Leek Brook to provide connection for the new houses

=== CVR Reconnect Leek Project ===
Since then, CVR have taken on the Leek project themselves, slimmed the scope to just include the construction of the Leek line, north-east curve, and Leek station, and after much dialogue with the council received outline planning permission for their own proposal in May 2018. They then launched their own project publicly on 1 February 2020.

In late 2024, track laying was largely completed towards Leek, with the first passenger service to the site of the new Leek station planned to run in early 2025 The first train ran to the site of the new station on the 3rd of December 2024 (a works train hauled by 33 102) then on 31 December 2024, a passenger train operated by Churnet Valley Railway travelled for the first time from Froghall to the new temporary terminus at Leek, carrying 400 invited guests.
