= Consall =

Village in Staffordshire, England

Coordinates: 53.03442°N 2.03209°W

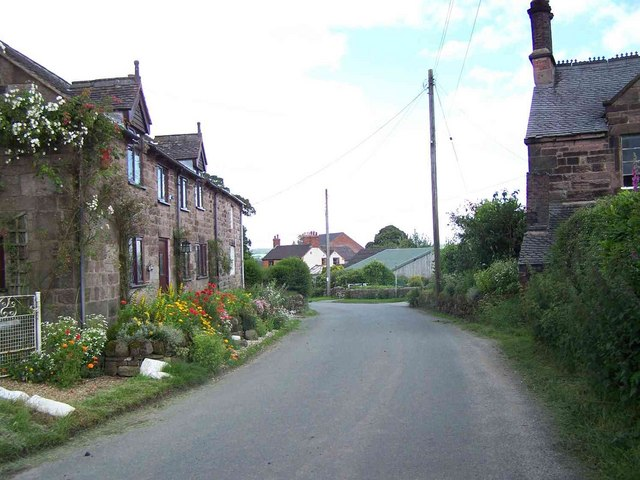
- Consall Lane

- Location within Staffordshire
- Population: 150 (2011 census)
- OS grid reference: SJ979485
- District: Staffordshire Moorlands
- Shire county: Staffordshire
- Region: West Midlands
- Country: England
- Sovereign state: United Kingdom
- Post town: Stoke-on-Trent
- Postcode district: ST9
- Dialling code: 01782/01538
- Police: Staffordshire
- Fire: Staffordshire
- Ambulance: West Midlands
- UK Parliament: Staffordshire Moorlands

Consall is a small village situated in the Staffordshire Moorlands, Staffordshire, England. It is approximately 6 miles south of the market town Leek and 8 miles east of Stoke-on-Trent. According to the 2001 Census, Consall had a population of 118. Population had risen to 150 at the 2011 census.

Agriculture still plays a large part in the village, but the number of farms and workers has decreased over the years. The main area of agriculture around the Consall area is dairy farming.

Consall has a relatively large number of visitor attractions considering the size of the village, such as Consall railway station, Consall Nature Park and Consall Hall Landscape Gardens.

Consall Nature Park is situated in the Churnet Valley and has a visitor centre and nature trails. During the summer the visitor centre is open every day, and the trails range in length and difficulty.

Consall Railway Station is on the Churnet Valley Railway network. The station was re-opened to passengers in July 1998 and it is possible to reach the villages Froghall and Cheddleton. For a considerable part of the journey the railway runs alongside the Caldon Canal, and about half a mile further down the rough vehicle track past the station is a mooring area for canal barges.

Continuing past the Black Lion car park will bring you to Consall Lime Kilns. These lime kilns have recently been restored with assistance from the Heritage Lottery Fund. These kilns date from the early 19th century and coal and limestone was brought along the canal to the kilns. The lime kilns ceased to be in use some time in the mid- to late 19th century.

== See also ==
- Listed buildings in Consall
