= Listed buildings in Consall =

Consall is a civil parish in the district of Staffordshire Moorlands, Staffordshire, England. It contains eight listed buildings that are recorded in the National Heritage List for England. All the listed buildings are designated at Grade II, the lowest of the three grades, which is applied to "buildings of national importance and special interest". The parish contains the village of Consall and the surrounding area, which is mainly rural. The listed buildings consist of three farmhouses, a cottage, a barn, a lime kiln, and a milepost and a milestone, both on the Caldon Canal.

== Buildings ==
Name and location	Photograph	Date	Notes
Ivy Cottage; 53.03424°N 2.03252°W	—	17th century	The cottage is in stone with a red tile roof. There are two storeys and one bay. The windows on the front are casements, in the right gable end is a chamfered mullioned window, and the entrance is at the rear.
Lower Farmhouse; 53.03550°N 2.03062°W		17th century	The farmhouse is timber framed and partly rendered on a sandstone plinth, and it has a tile roof with crested ridge tiles. There is a single storey and an attic, and three bays. The windows are casements. The porch is timber-framed and gabled, as are the three dormers, and all have bargeboards and finials.
Barn south of Lower Farmhouse; 53.03533°N 2.03036°W	—	17th century	The barn is in stone with a tile roof, and has two levels, consisting of a hay loft over cow sheds. It contains three doorways, windows, and a hay loft door.
Middle Farmhouse; 53.03431°N 2.03108°W	—	17th century	The farmhouse is in stone, and has a tile roof with verge parapets, ball finials, and corbelled kneelers. There are two storeys and five bays. In the centre is a doorway, and the windows are casements. On the front is a carved stone head, possibly re-set.
Milestone at SJ 9954 4993; 53.04662°N 2.00797°W		c. 1779	The milestone is on the towpath of the Caldon Canal. It is roughly wedge-shaped with a rounded top, and is about 40 centimetres (16 in) high. The milestone is inscribed with the numbers "3" and "14".
Milepost at SJ 9953 4993; 53.04664°N 2.00797°W		1820	The milepost is on the towpath of the Caldon Canal. It is in cast iron, and consists of a circular shaft with two convex plates and a domed top. On the plates are the distances to Uttoxeter and Etruria, and on the shaft is a quatrefoil panel with the date and details of the manufacturer.
Consall Forge; 53.04056°N 2.00308°W		Early 19th century	A lime kiln in stone, it has a retaining wall about 10 metres (33 ft) high and 50 metres (160 ft) long, and contains four bays separated by massive buttresses. Between these are four round-arched stoke holes, each about 2 metres (6 ft 7 in) high.
Consall Old Hall; 53.03874°N 2.02162°W	—	Mid 19th century	The farmhouse, possibly with an earlier core, is in stone, and has a tile roof with a crested ridge and verge parapets with ball finials. There are two storeys, four bays, and a lean-to on the right. The doorway has a round head and a fanlight, and is flanked by bay windows. The other windows are mullioned and transomed, those in the upper floor with gablets.
