= Churnet Valley line =

Railway line in Staffordshire, England

Overview
- Status: Part in heritage use, part disused
- Locale: Staffordshire, England
- Termini: North Rode, Uttoxeter
- Stations: 14

Service
- Type: Heavy rail
- System: North Staffordshire Railway

History
- Opened: 1849
- Closed: 1988

Technical
- Line length: 27 miles 54 chains (27.68 miles, 44.54 km)
- Track gauge: 4 ft 8 1/2 in (1,435 mm) standard gauge

The Churnet Valley line was one of the three original routes planned and built by the North Staffordshire Railway. Authorised in 1846, the line opened in 1849 and ran from North Rode in Cheshire to Uttoxeter in East Staffordshire, England. The line was closed in several stages between 1964 and 1988, but part of the central section passed into the hands of a preservation society; it operates today as the Churnet Valley Railway.

== Origins ==
Several proposals were put forward for a line through the Churnet Valley in the 1830s. Plans were published by the Manchester and Derby Railway (Churnet Valley) Company in 1841 for a line from Macclesfield to Derby, via Leek, Cheadle, Rocester and Uttoxeter. At Macclesfield, the line would connect with the Grand Junction Railway and with the North Midland Railway at Derby; this would result a direct route between Manchester and London. In 1844, the company by now renamed simply the Churnet Valley Railway Company laid out its prospectus for construction of the line in 1844 and, following approval of the plan by the Board of Trade, preparation was made for the necessary approval of Parliament to be sought.

As the draft bill was being considered by the House of Commons, the directors of the company agreed an amalgamation with the Trent Valley Railway and the Staffordshire Potteries Railway to form the Churnet, Potteries and Trent Junction Railway, soon to be called the North Staffordshire Railway (NSR). The Churnet Valley bill was withdrawn and, in 1846, a new bill was submitted to Parliament entitled the North Staffordshire Railway (Churnet Valley Line) Bill.

North Staffordshire Railway (Churnet Valley) Act 1846
- Act of Parliament
- Parliament of the United Kingdom
- Long title: An Act for making a Railway from the Manchester and Birmingham Railway at Macclesfield to join the Birmingham and Derby Line of the Midland Railways, with a Branch to Stoke-upon-Trent.
- Citation: 9 & 10 Vict. c. lxxxvi

Dates
- Royal assent: 26 June 1846
Other legislation
Repealed by	North Staffordshire Railway Act 1847

Status: Repealed

The merger of the three companies had not been without opposition and many shareholders of the Churnet Valley company were worried that the Churnet Valley line would become a small adjunct to the other NSR lines between Derby-Crewe and Macclesfield-Colwich. After negotiation, it became a stipulation of the bill that the dividend of the NSR could not exceed 5% until the Churnet Valley line was fully open. With this concession granted the bill proceeded through Parliament and received royal assent on 26 June 1846 as the North Staffordshire Railway (Churnet Valley) Act 1846 (9 & 10 Vict. c. lxxxvi). Allocated capital for the lines was £1,200,000.

== Construction ==
The tender for construction of the line was let in 1847 to J&S Tredwell for a price of £330,218. Construction began in September 1847 and, in November 1847, a champagne party was held 40 feet (12.2 m) underground to celebrate the laying of the first brick in Nab Hill tunnel near Leek. Work on the section south of Leek involved diverting the river Churnet at Consall and also one of the first instance of a canal being converted into a railway, with closure of the Uttoxeter Canal and it being used as the track bed between Froghall and Uttoxeter. The conversion had been made possible by the acquisition of the Trent and Mersey Canal and its subsidiaries, the Caldon Canal and the Uttoxeter Canal, by the NSR as part of the 1846 act. Work on the line was concluded in 1849 and the line of 27 miles 54 chains (27.68 miles, 44.54 km) opened to both passenger and goods traffic on 13 July 1849.

== Operation ==
Although originally planned as a main route between Manchester and Derby, the line became, as many shareholders had worried, something of a backwater. Through trains required co-operation with the LNWR, something that the NSR did not have for many years; when good relations with the LNWR were settled, some through services were run but not as many as once anticipated.

Train services settled to a small number of local trains between Macclesfield and Uttoxeter supplemented by a smaller number of slightly shorter workings, such as Macclesfield-Leek. Many excursions were run over the line, as the NSR made efforts to promote Rudyard Lake as a tourist destination. The lake, actually a reservoir, supplied water to the Trent & Mersey Canal and had therefore become the property of the NSR in 1846. However, the NSR only owned the lake, not the land around it, and protracted legal proceedings meant that the NSR were not fully able to promote Rudyard until the early part of the 20th century. Another important tourist destination for the NSR was also served by the line; Alton Towers, owned by the Earl of Shrewsbury, was open to the public on several days during the summer and the NSR provided special trains on these occasions.

The NSR were not the only group seeking to promote the Churnet Valley as a tourist destination and through the efforts of a number of local hoteliers the valley became known as "Little Switzerland". Despite the picturesque description which arose from the valley's steep sides, the area was also an important site in the mineral industry with iron and copper, as well as limestone and sandstone, being quarried. Previously carried by canal, the output from the quarries and the associated industries was moved by rail especially when the NSR opened a line from Stoke to Leek in 1867; principal among these were the copper wire works at Froghall and Oakamoor and the limestone quarries at Caldon Low. The latter was also owned by the NSR and moved stone from the quarry to Froghall station via a 3 ft 6 in (1,067 mm) narrow gauge railway; at one point, over 1,000 tons per week was being shipped from Froghall to Brunner Mond.

== London Midland Scottish years ==
Along with the rest of the NSR, the line passed into the ownership of the London, Midland and Scottish Railway (LMS) which made little change to the operation of the line. Passenger services remained much as they had done under the NSR, but Alton Towers became an increasingly popular tourist destination and frequent excursions terminated there. Further north, at Rudyard, there were several changes as the LMS sold off the golf club and the Rudyard Hotel. One result was a confusing change of station names; Rudyard Lake was renamed Cliffe Park and Rudyard became Rudyard Lake.

One long-distance train operated over the line; the Saturdays-only Eastern Counties Express between Manchester London Road and Cromer ran in both directions along the Churnet Valley, stopping only at Leek to pick up/set down passengers to or from beyond Nottingham.

Freight traffic suffered from the effects of the Great Depression; the most notable casualty being the cessation of operations at Caldon Low quarries, although they subsequently reopened when the LMS found a lessee for the quarry. The narrow gauge line between the quarry and Froghall closed in 1936 and all output was shipped via the Waterhouses branch, which left the Churnet Valley line at Leekbrook Junction.

=== Wartime services ===
With the outbreak of World War II, the line moved to an emergency timetable, in line with most British railways. The Churnet Valley was unusual in that the basic service was improved in terms of number of services, although the timings were slower. The increase in services was due to Bolton's at Froghall being an important munitions site and Alton Towers becoming 121 Officer Cadet Training Unit, Royal Artillery.

== British Railways ==
Following nationalisation in 1948, the line became part of the London Midland Region of British Railways. Passenger services remained fairly consistent with the wartime levels of five 'up' trains and six 'down' trains per day with additional workmen's services between Leek and Uttoxeter. Falling passenger numbers throughout the 1950s led to a proposal in 1959 for the withdrawal of all advertised passenger services between Macclesfield and Uttoxeter, with the retention of the non-advertised workmen's services between Leek and Uttoxeter only. Despite objections, the proposal was implemented on 7 November 1960. This did not stem the financial losses on the line, and the entire line between Leek and North Rode closed in June 1964. At the same time, local goods facilities were withdrawn at all other stations except Leek followed by the withdrawal of the passenger service over the south section between Leek and Uttoxeter in January 1965 and the closure of the line south of Oakamoor.

This left the line with public goods services from Leek to Stoke, and bulk sand traffic from Oakamoor. The Leek services lasted until 1970, when the line between Leek and Leek Brook Junction closed but the Oakamoor sand traffic continued until 1988.

== Preservation ==
In 1971, a preservation society, the Cheshire and Staffordshire Railway Society, were looking for a site. One of their first possible locations was the section of line between Rudyard and Leek, but this fell through with the demolition of the Leek station buildings in 1973. Still looking for a site the society now renamed the North Staffordshire Railway Society managed to secure a lease on Cheddleton from its new owners, Staffordshire County Council.

Despite not having access to the track through the station, as this was then part of the line to the Sand Sidings at Oakamoor, the members established a small heritage site. However, with the withdrawal of the last goods services from Oakamoor in 1988, the society was able to take over the line and commence bigger operations.

Since then the society has reopened the railway stations at Cheddleton, Consall and Kingsley & Froghall.

Another 1 1/2-mile (2.4 km) section of the trackbed is occupied by the Rudyard Lake Steam Railway, a 10 1/4 in (260 mm) gauge tourist line which runs beside Rudyard Lake. It was established in 1985 by Peter Hanton of Congleton, who completed its construction in 1993, but sold it to an operating company in 2000 due to his poor health.
