= Consall railway station =

Preserved railway station in Staffordshire, England

Consall
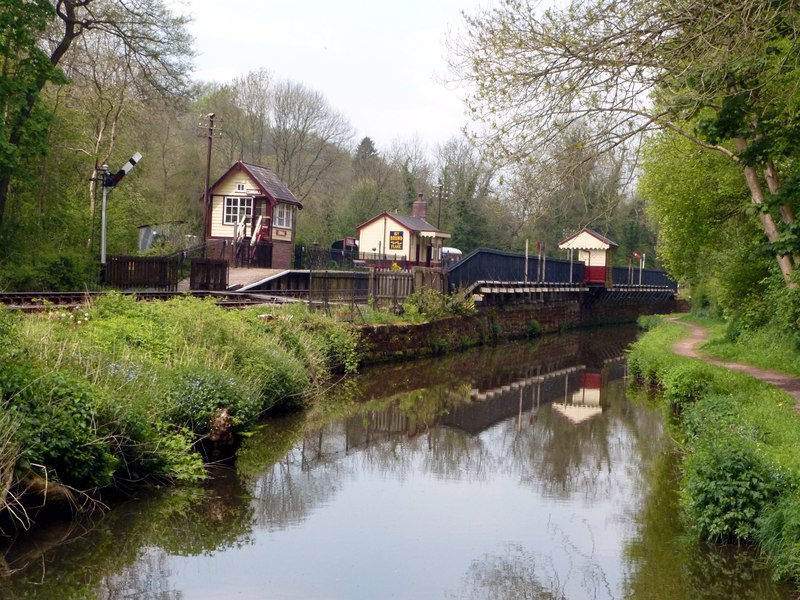
- Consall station and the Caldon Canal

General information
- Location: Consall, Staffordshire Moorlands; England
- Coordinates: 53.038095°N 2.001600°W
- Grid reference: SK000489
- System: Station on Churnet Valley Railway
- Operator: Churnet Valley Railway
- Platforms: 2

History
- Original company: North Staffordshire Railway
- Post-grouping: London, Midland & Scottish Railway

Key dates
- 3 March 1902: Opened
- 4 January 1965: Closed
- 11 July 1998: Re-opened (preservation)
Location

Consall railway station is a railway station serving the village of Consall in Staffordshire, England. It is located on the Churnet Valley Railway.

== History ==
Consall station, situated on the Churnet Valley Line of the NSR, was opened to both passengers and goods on 3 March 1902. The station was a quiet country station serving the needs of workers involved in the forge and nearby lime kilns. During the 1960s, passenger numbers decreased to such an extent that the station was closed in 1965.

== Re-opening, and the Churnet Valley Railway ==
During the 1970s, a railway preservation base was set up at nearby Cheddleton station. This was later to become the base of the Churnet Valley Railway. The CVR had been slowly progressing in preserving the line when, in the late 1990s, they had reached the station site.

The down (western) platform was still in existence, but without any platform edging stones. These were replaced, and this platform opened for passengers on 11 July 1998. Construction later began on the replica station building, which opened on 3 March 2002.

The second track running through the station, which had served as a run-round loop, was made redundant when the line was extended to Froghall, so work began on resignalling this loop to allow two trains to operate on the line. This involved the addition of signals and a signal box to the station (the original line was double track throughout, so no box was ever located at Consall).

To finish, the wooden up (eastern) platform was reconstructed so that the original 1902 shelter could be put back into use and so passing trains had a platform to call in the up direction.

This platform was opened on 22 April 2005, and now the station is relatively complete and is the nerve centre of train operations on peak days due to the new passing loop and signal box.

== Notes ==
Preceding station	Heritage railways	Following station
Cheddleton	Churnet Valley Railway	Kingsley and Froghall
