= Froghall =

Village in Staffordshire, England

Coordinates: 53.022°N 1.965°W

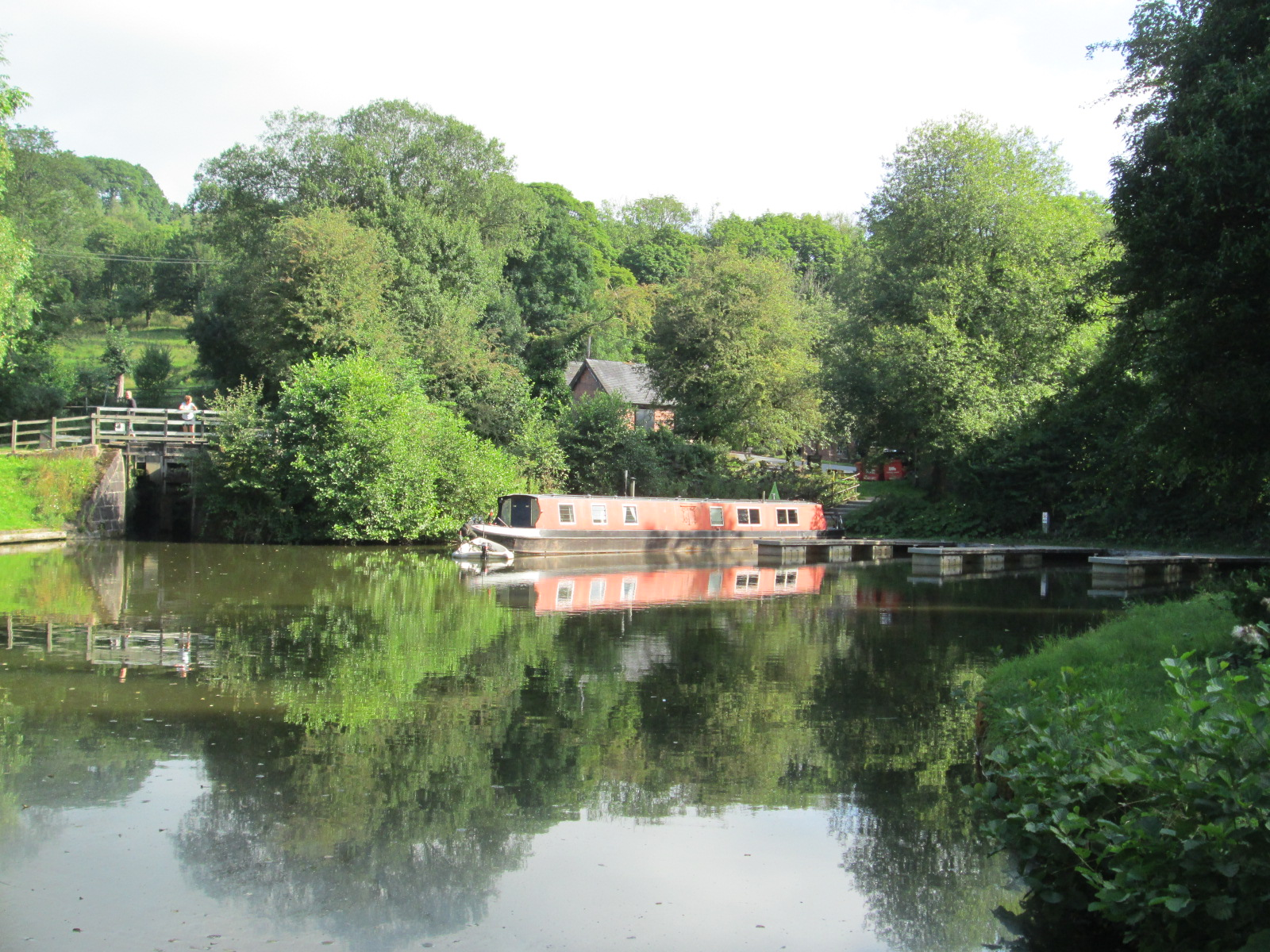
- The canal basin at Froghall Wharf

- Location within Staffordshire
- OS grid reference: SK024472
- District: Staffordshire Moorlands
- Shire county: Staffordshire
- Region: West Midlands
- Country: England
- Sovereign state: United Kingdom
- Post town: Stoke-on-Trent
- Postcode district: ST10
- Dialling code: 01538
- Police: Staffordshire
- Fire: Staffordshire
- Ambulance: West Midlands
- UK Parliament: Staffordshire Moorlands

Froghall is a village situated approximately ten miles to the east of Stoke-on-Trent and two miles north of Cheadle in Staffordshire, England. Population details as taken at the 2011 Census can be found under Kingsley. Froghall sits in the Churnet Valley, a beautiful and relatively unspoilt part of Staffordshire. There are some excellent and challenging walks in the area, many of which encompass the area's historic development by the coal, ironstone, copper and limestone industries.

== Industry around Froghall ==
For a relatively small village there has been a lot of historic development in and around Froghall by Industry over the last few hundred years. The main feature of the village is the historic copper factory of Thomas Bolton and sons, now called Bolton Copper. A lot of the factory stood derelict before being demolished in 2011. However, a last minute intervention saved an original chimney which is still standing.

A £10m shortfall in a pension scheme, an explosion and the loss of a main customer which accounted for 70 per cent of the order book led to the downfall of Thomas Bolton.

Attempts to find a buyer for the 200-year-old copperworks in Staffordshire were unsuccessful resulting in redundancy of the majority of the 105 workers.

Despite a strong level of interest shown in the Froghall business as a going concern, no deal was forthcoming and the factory was closed.

The Thomas Bolton Copperworks at Froghall (and the closed works in the nearby village of Oakamoor) are famous for the world's first transatlantic telegraph cables, which were manufactured and rolled at the plants.

During the Second World War the factories made wiring components for Spitfire fighter planes. The copper works are the Staffordshire Moorlands' last link to the historic copper-mining industry that was centered on the nearby Manifold Valley and its famous Ecton Copper Mines.

The limestone industry was also significant in Froghall. At the nearby Froghall Wharf, limestone was loaded onto canal narrow boats or burnt in lime kilns and then transported to the Potteries or further afield. The limestone was mined in the huge quarries at Caldon Low and then loaded onto an inclined tramway to Froghall. Four tramways were built and parts of them are still traceable in the landscape including various bridges and inclines. The final tramway, built by James Trubshaw was the most significant and involved the most engineering. Trubshaw's tunnel near Windy Harbour is an excellent relic of this fourth route.

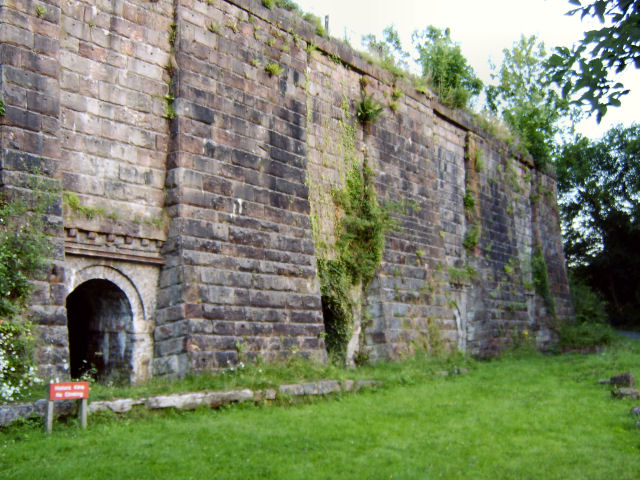
Lime kilns near Froghall Wharf

The canal basin at Froghall Wharf is now a pleasant spot for pleasure craft and walkers, with the huge dormant lime kilns dominating the area.

As mentioned above, the Caldon Canal has played a large part in the development of industry around Froghall. The basin at Froghall Wharf was originally the terminus of the Caldon Canal, and a separate branch then ran to Uttoxeter. The Uttoxeter Canal was opened to traffic in 1811 and after years of heavy losses was closed in 1849. The branch was then mostly filled in and a railway was built over most of the canal bed.

== Transport ==
Froghall was formerly served by Kingsley and Froghall railway station, on the North Staffordshire Railway's Churnet Valley Line from North Rode to Uttoxeter via Leek. The line closed to passenger trains in the 1960s and completely closed to freight in 1988 with the transfer of the sand traffic from nearby Oakamoor to road haulage. Passenger trains returned to Froghall in the 1990s after preservation of the line by the Churnet Valley Railway. At the present time, Kingsley and Froghall is the terminus of the railway.

The A52, which links Stoke-on-Trent with Derby, passes through Froghall. This historic road was used years ago to transport coal mined in Cheadle to Ashbourne, and until recently many older residents would refer to the road as the "Old Coal Road".
