= Fablok TKh49 =

Class of Polish steam locomotives

TKh49 (Ferrum 47)
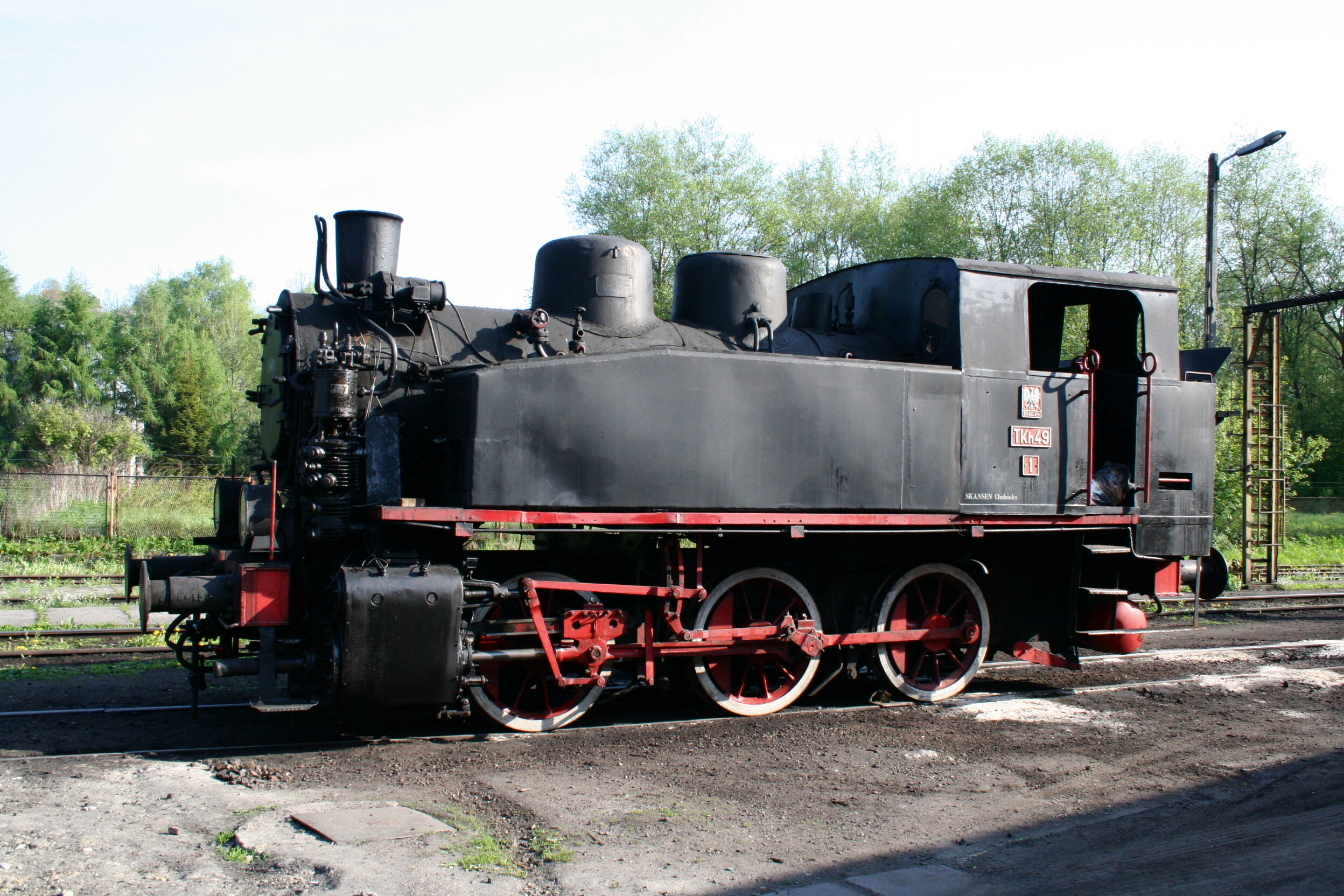
- TKh49-1 in Chabówka
Type and origin
- Power type: Steam
- Builder: Fablok
- Build date: 1948-1961
- Total produced: 437
Specifications
- Configuration
  - Whyte: 0-6-0T
  - AAR: C
  - UIC: C n2t
- Gauge: 1,435 mm (4 ft 8 1/2 in)
- Driver dia.: 1,150 mm (45.28 in)
- Minimum curve: 70 m (229 ft 8 in)
- Wheelbase: 3.4 m (11 ft 1.86 in)
- Length: 9.11 m (29 ft 10.66 in)
- Width: 2.88 m (9 ft 5.39 in)
- Height: 3.675 m (12 ft 0.69 in)
- Loco weight: 44.4 tonnes (43.7 long tons; 48.9 short tons)
- Fuel type: coal
- Fuel capacity: 2.5 tonnes (2.5 long tons; 2.8 short tons)
- Water cap.: 5 m^{3} (180 cu ft)
- Firebox
  - Grate area: 1.7 m^{2} (18 sq ft)
- Boiler pressure: 13 bars (190 psi)
- Heating surface: 100 m^{2} (1,100 sq ft)
- Cylinders: Two, outside
- Cylinder size: 460 mm × 540 mm (18.11 in × 21.26 in)
- Valve gear: Heusinger
Performance figures
- Maximum speed: 40 km/h (25 mph)
- Power output: 400 hp (300 kW)
- Tractive effort: 7,850 kgf (17,310 lbf)
Career
- Locale: Poland, China, Romania, Hungary, United Kingdom, Belgium

The Fablok T3A also known as TKh49 or Ferrum 47 / 724 is a class of Polish steam industrial tank locomotive. It was built by Fablok in 1948-1961 years.

== History ==
The locomotive is based on a draft from the years 1927-1929; seven locomotives of the factory designation T1A, basing upon Austrian license, were built by Fablok then. Its development with a superheater was Fablok T2A (Ferrum 29 or Tkh29), of which eleven were built before World War II. The name Ferrum came from Ferrum Ironworks, for which it was developed. The technical documentation survived until after World War II and ten more T2A were manufactured. Due to big need of industrial locomotives in looted post-war Poland, it was decided to develop it into a simplified class of locomotive, factory name T3A or Ferrum 47, from 1947 year. Among other it lacked a superheater. At least 437 examples were made in the years 1948 - 1961, including 30 to China, 3 to Romania and 3 to Hungary. Some factory records indicate 480 locomotives made, but details are not confirmed. Later production locomotives, with more welding adopted, were referred to as Ferrum 724. In China the locomotives were designated as XK 13 and several examples of the class were reported to be working in 1993, with at least three preserved thereafter.

These locomotives worked exclusively in industry, like coalmines, ironworks, chemical works, and were usually designated with TKh prefix, meaning 0-6-0T freight locomotives in Polish State Railways designation system, merged with serial numbers. Only in 1996 one locomotive was acquired by the Polish State Railways (PKP) for its museum depot in Chabówka, and formally designated as PKP class TKh49, namely TKh49-1, thus being the newest PKP steam locomotive.

== Preservation ==
The locomotive TKh49-1 is preserved at the Museum of Vehicles and Railway Technology in Chabówka, whilst thirteen more are in other museums or as monuments. Several are in working condition. After industrial service, several locomotives have been exported to the United Kingdom for use on heritage railways as detailed below.

Number	Name	Railway	Livery	Status	Notes
2871	""	Churnet Valley Railway	Green	Awaiting Restoration	Owned by "TKh Support Group". Arrived April 2014 from the Spa Valley Railway, after purchase by Members of the CVR MPD. Funds being acquired for eventual restoration.
2944	Hotspur	Churnet Valley Railway	Green	Operational	Owned by "TKh Support Group". Entered service June 2014 after 12-month restoration by members of MPD following purchase by Members of the MPD. Already done ~1500 miles since restoration!
3135	Spartan	Swindon & Cricklade Railway	Red	Stored, Awaiting 10 year overhaul	Bought by the S&CR in December 2014 from the Spa Valley Railway.
3138	Hutnik	Appleby Frodingham Railway	Red	Awaiting Overhaul	Purchased by the AFRPS in 1993, and brought back to Scunthorpe shortly afterwards. It was used for over 17 years on passenger trains, but in 2009 was found to be in need of boiler repairs.
4015	Karel	Avon Valley Railway	PKP Green	Operational	Imported to UK and moved to the Avon Valley Railway. Withdrawn in 2013, and sent to the Flour Mill in the Forest of Dean for overhaul. Returned to traffic September 2016.
5374	Lord Oliver Brown	Plym Valley Railway	Green and Pink	Operational	Arrived in UK in 1992, and entered service on Northampton & Lamport Railway. Sold in November 2016 to a new owner. 5374 is now in ticket and will be running at the Plym Valley Railway (2025).
5387	General Maczek	Stoomcentrum_Maldegem (Belgium)	Brown	Under Restoration	Used in Poland until 1990 as a switch engine in a cement yard. In 1992 bought - with TkH 5387 - by the Northampton & Lamport Railway. Back in service condition in 2000. Sold after few years of touristic service to Stoomcentrum_Maldegem (2006). Loaned to CFV3V in 2020.
115	""	Shougang steel work plant railway	Black	Stored	Sealed in Shijingshan Headquarters of Shougang in 2019
