= Kingsley and Froghall railway station =

Preserved railway station in Staffordshire, England

Kingsley and Froghall
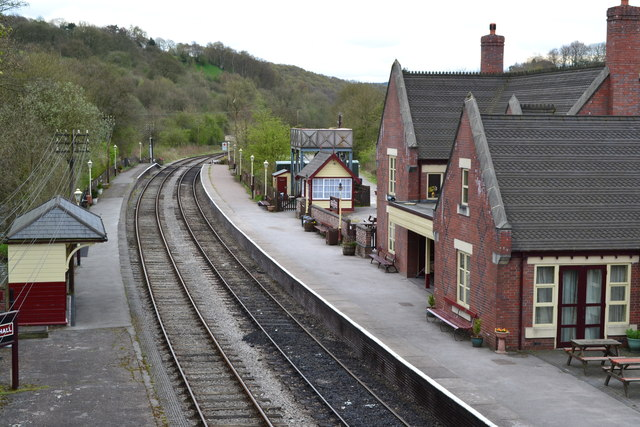
- Kingsley and Froghall station

General information
- Location: Froghall and Kingsley, Staffordshire Moorlands; England
- Coordinates: 53.0208°N 1.964°W
- Grid reference: SK024471
- System: Station on Churnet Valley Railway
- Operator: Churnet Valley Railway
- Platforms: 2

History
- Original company: North Staffordshire Railway
- Post-grouping: London, Midland & Scottish Railway

Key dates
- 1 September 1849: Opened as Froghall
- 1 July 1907: Renamed Kingsley and Froghall
- 4 January 1965: Closed
- 11 August 2001: reopened
Location

Kingsley and Froghall is a railway station serving the villages of Froghall and Kingsley in Staffordshire, England. It is the southern terminus of the Churnet Valley Railway.

== History ==
Kingsley and Froghall station, situated on the Churnet Valley Line of the North Staffordshire Railway, was opened to both passengers and goods on 1 September 1849.

The station was a busy country station serving the needs of workers at nearby Thomas Bolton's copper refinery.

As with many UK railways, passenger numbers in the 1960s decreased to such an extent that the station was closed to both passengers and goods in 1965.

== Re-opening and the Churnet Valley Railway ==
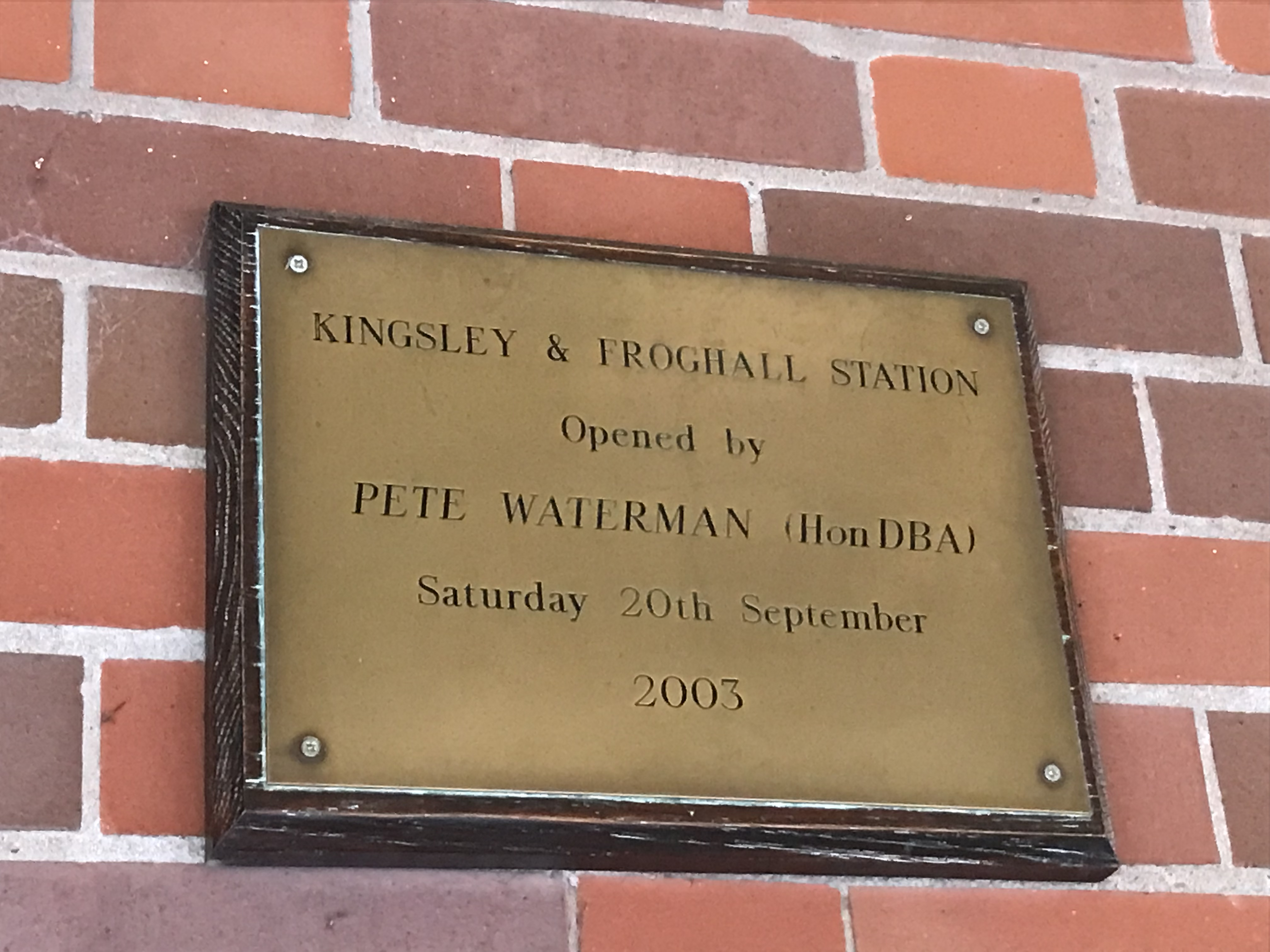
Plaque marking the re-opening of Kingsley and Froghall railway station

During the 1970s, a railway preservation base was set up at nearby Cheddleton station; later, this was to become the base of the Churnet Valley Railway (CVR). The CVR had been progressing slowly in preserving the line when, in the late 1990s, they had reached the station site. After closure by British Rail, the station buildings had been demolished. Initial rebuilding of the station resulted in the down platform reopening for passengers on 11 August 2001. Construction began later on the new station building, which opened on 20 September 2003.

Since 2003, more work has been done on the station to make the site as complete as the nearby Consall. Initially, this involved resurfacing the down platform and adding fences, a few small buildings, and station furniture. With this side now relatively complete, attention has been turned to the second (up) platform where the overhang on the canal and associated fences have been rebuilt, along with walls and the large waiting shelter but as of 2012, this platform is not in use.

The station is the southern limit of passenger operations on the line.

== Notes ==
Preceding station	Heritage railways	Following station
Consall	Churnet Valley Railway	Terminus
	Historical railways	
Consall	North Staffordshire Railway; Churnet Valley Line	Oakamoor
