= Leek Brook railway station =

Railway station in Staffordshire, England

Leek Brook
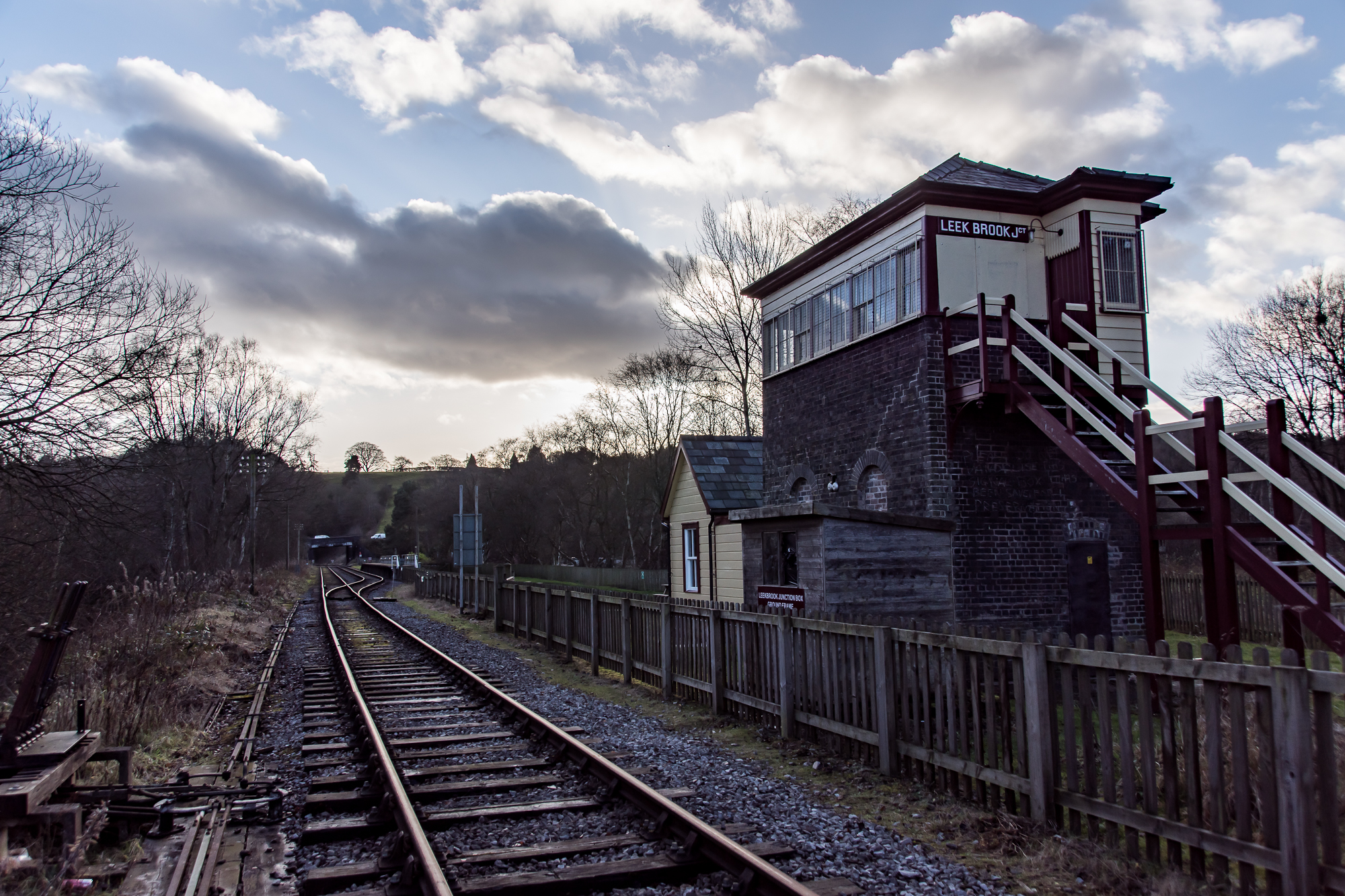
- Leek Brook station in 2019

General information
- Location: Leekbrook, Staffordshire Moorlands; England
- Coordinates: 53.0800°N 2.0296°W
- Grid reference: SJ981536
- Platforms: 3 until 1956, now 1

Other information
- Status: Used (Heritage Railway)

History
- Original company: North Staffordshire Railway
- Post-grouping: London, Midland and Scottish Railway; British Railways

Key dates
- 1904: Opened
- 1956: Closed
- 24 August 1996: reopened as a heritage railway station
Location

Leek Brook railway station is a passenger station that serves the village of Leekbrook in Staffordshire, England.

== History ==
Leek Brook railway station was opened by the North Staffordshire Railway (NSR) in 1904. It consisted of an island platform with two faces on the line from Stoke-on-Trent and Leek and a single platform on the down (i.e. Leek bound) direction of the Churnet Valley Line.

The railway station was in a rural area, not advertised in railway timetables, and was described by the NSR as a halt. The Churnet Valley platform was mainly used as an interchange platform with the St Edwards Hospital tramway using the other side of the platform. Passengers to and from Stoke-on-Trent used the platforms on the Stoke–Leek line and walked over to the Churnet Valley platform to catch a tram to the hospital. Passengers wishing to head south on the Churnet Valley line towards Uttoxeter would have to catch a northbound train to Leek and then return through Leek Brook on a southbound train.

Leek Brook railway station closed to all traffic on 7 May 1956, having already closed its hospital railway two years prior, in November 1954.

== Churnet Valley Railway ==
During the 1970s, a railway preservation base was set up at nearby Cheddleton railway station. This was later to become the base of the Churnet Valley Railway (CVR). The CVR had slowly been progressing in preserving the line when, in the late 1990s, they had reached the site of Leek Brook station, which, however, was not judged worthy of re-opening due to the large amount of other preservation projects being undertaken by the CVR at the time and the poor access to the site.

The first CVR passenger service to the station site opened on 24 August 1996. In November 2010, some CVR trains began to continue beyond the site towards Cauldon Low, with most services now terminating at Ipstones, on the Waterhouses branch. In late 2024, track laying was largely completed towards Leek from Leekbrook, with the first passenger service to the site of the new Leek station planned to run in early 2025. On 31 December 2024, a train operated by Churnet Valley Railway travelled for the first time from Froghall to the new temporary terminus at Leek, carrying 400 guests.

There is no public access to the station, so neither boarding nor alighting is possible there. Trains stop there only to detach the locomotive from one end of the train and run round to attach it to the other.

== Route ==
Preceding station	Historical railways	Following station
Leek Line open, station closed	North Staffordshire Railway Stoke–Leek line	Wall Grange Line disused, station closed
Leek Line open, station closed	North Staffordshire Railway Churnet Valley Line	Cheddleton Line & station open
Heritage railways
Leek	Churnet Valley Railway	Cheddleton
