= Leek railway station =

Former railway station in Staffordshire, England

Leek
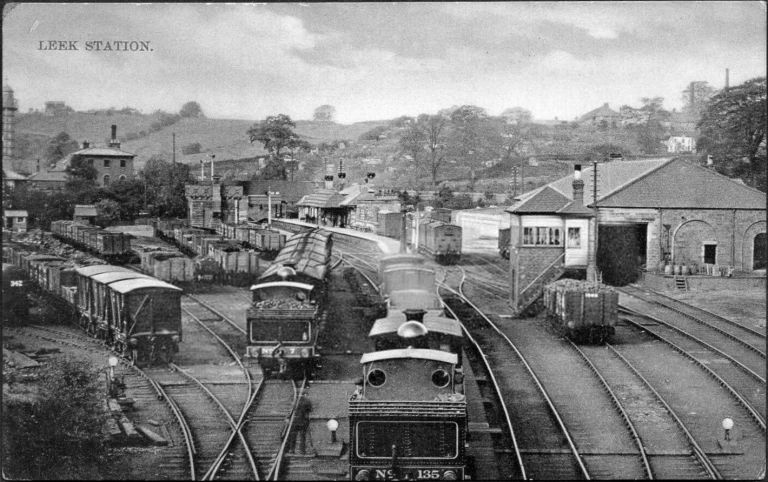
- Leek station in 1910

General information
- Location: Leek, Staffordshire Moorlands; England
- Coordinates: 53.1003°N 2.0329°W
- Grid reference: SJ978559

Other information
- Status: Disused

History
- Opened: 13 July 1849; 177 years ago
- Closed: 4 January 1965; 61 years ago
- Original company: North Staffordshire Railway
- Post-grouping: London, Midland and Scottish Railway; London Midland Region of British Railways

Key dates
- 3 July 1970: Closed to freight
- 31 December 2024: First passenger train runs over re-laid line to Leek
Location

Leek railway station served the town of Leek, Staffordshire. It was opened by the North Staffordshire Railway in 1849. Passenger services to Uttoxeter were withdrawn in 1965, with complete closure following in 1970. For a short time in 1961–62, special football excursions (the Stanley Matthews Express) were arranged to Stoke following the return of Sir Stanley Matthews to Stoke City FC.

== History ==
Leek had a substantial station and goods yard, but competition from road transport led to the withdrawal of services to Stoke-on-Trent in 1956 and the remaining passenger services to Uttoxeter in 1965. Freight workings continued until 1970.

The site of the station is now occupied by a Morrisons supermarket, although the road bridge is still in situ between the latter's car park and petrol station.

== Reconnecting Leek ==
Proposals to restore Leek to the national network gained traction in 2009 when Moorlands and City Railways Ltd (MCR) bought the 20 miles of railway line from Stoke in the west-direction of Leek.

Several proposals for the location of a new station were made, at Cornhill and Barnfield industrial estate.

MCR collapsed and the Churnet Valley Railway raised the funds to take the proposal forward on its own, with planning permission in May 2018. In late 2024, track laying was largely completed towards Leek, with the first passenger service to the site of the new Leek station planned to run in early 2025. On 31 December 2024, a train operated by Churnet Valley Railway travelled for the first time from Froghall to a new temporary terminus 0.25 miles (0.4 km) short of the site of the original Leek station, carrying 400 invited guests.

== Route ==
Preceding station	Disused railways	Following station
Rudyard; Line and station closed	North Staffordshire Railway; Churnet Valley line	Leek Brook; Station closed
