= Churnet Valley Railway =

Heritage railway in Staffordshire, England

Coordinates: 53°3′52″N 2°1′35″W

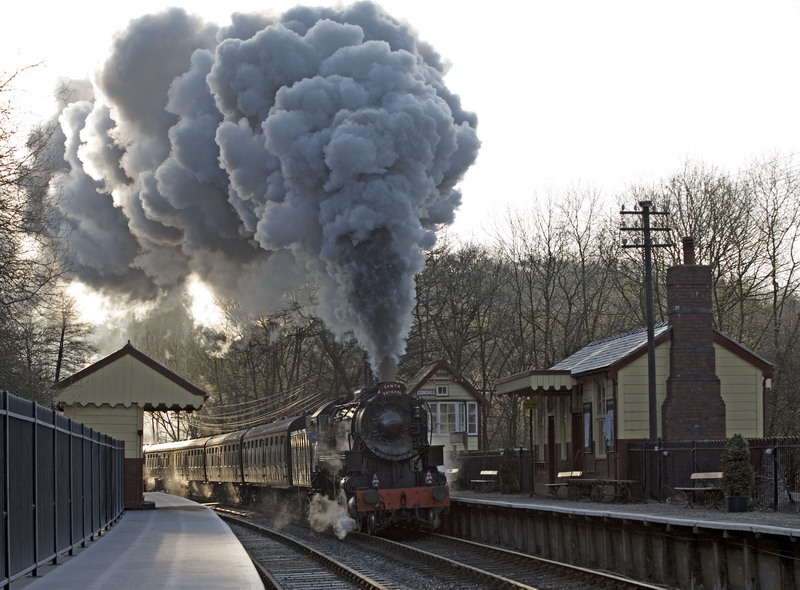
- A steam-hauled train at Consall station

Commercial operations
- Name: British Rail
- Built by: North Staffordshire Railway
- Original gauge: 4 ft 8 1/2 in (1,435 mm) standard gauge

Preserved operations
- Owned by: Churnet Valley Railway (1992) plc; Charitable trust: North Staffordshire Railway Company (1978) Ltd
- Operated by: Churnet Valley Railway (1992) plc
- Stations: 4
- Length: 10 1/2 miles (16.9 km)
- Preserved gauge: 4 ft 8 1/2 in (1,435 mm) standard gauge

Commercial history
- Opened: 13 July 1849
- Closed to passengers: 4 January 1965
- Closed: 30 August 1988

Preservation history
- 30 October 1992: Incorporation of "Goldenlaunch plc" (renamed "Churnet Valley Railway (1992) plc" 15 December 1992)
- 3 May 1996: CVR granted light railway order
- 4 July 1996: CVR buys Leek Brook - Oakamoor trackbed
- 24 August 1996: First service train runs from Cheddleton to Leek Brook
- 11 July 1998: Consall station re-opened
- 11 August 2001: Kingsley & Froghall station re-opened
- 13 August 2004: Consall signal box commissioned, allowing two-train operation
- 21 September 2008: Track to Oakamoor Sand Sidings re-open for limited use
- 12 November 2010: Cauldon Lowe branch re-opened
- 6 February 2014: Ipstones Loop re-opened
- 31 December 2024: First train runs over re-laid line to Leek

Website
- http://www.churnetvalleyrailway.co.uk

The Churnet Valley Railway is a preserved standard gauge heritage railway running through the Staffordshire Moorlands and the valley of the River Churnet in Staffordshire, England. It operates along part of the former Churnet Valley Line, which was opened by the North Staffordshire Railway in 1849, and the steeply graded Waterhouses branch line which opened in 1905. The section from Kingsley and Froghall to Leek closed to passengers in January 1965 and to freight from Oakamoor to Stoke-on-Trent in 1988; and the Waterhouses branch closed to passenger traffic in 1935, with the final freight running in 1988. The preservation society began in 1971 with a small demonstration line in the goods yard at Cheddleton, before beginning operations over the former Churnet Valley Line in 1996 following withdrawal of the final freight services in 1988.

The line is approximately 10 1/2 miles (16.9 km) long from Kingsley & Froghall to Ipstones. The line from Leek Brook Junction to Ipstones was opened by Moorland & City Railways (MCR) in 2010 after they took a lease out from Network Rail. This has subsequently been purchased by the Churnet Valley Railway. The main stations along the line are Kingsley and Froghall, Consall, Cheddleton, Leek Brook and Ipstones (which is only used as a run around loop).

An extension to the town of Leek which will act as the northern terminus of the CVR was completed in late 2024.

== Preservation history ==
=== Early days of preservation: Cheddleton station (1964–1977) ===
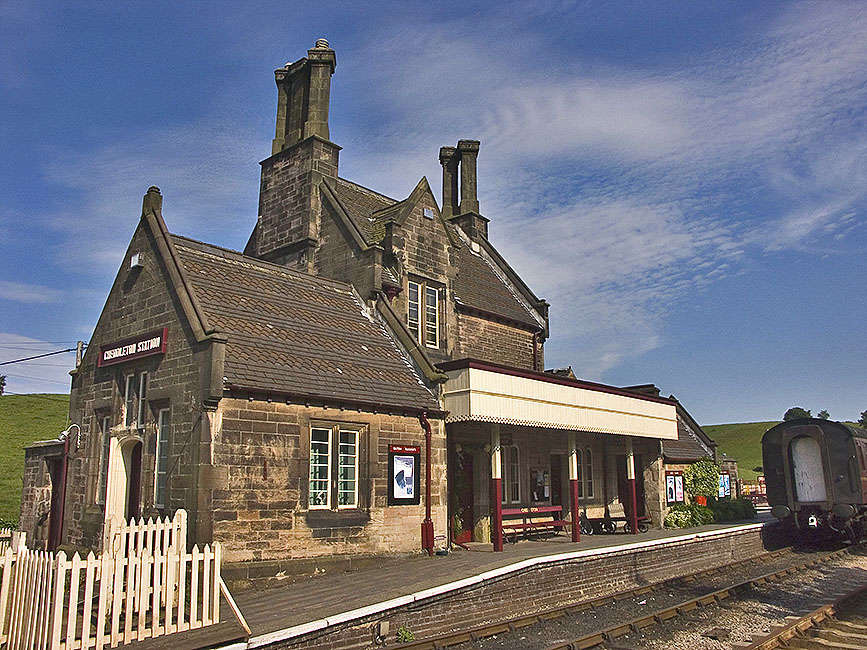
Cheddleton station: the Churnet Valley Railway's first acquisition in 1976.

The Cheshire and Staffordshire Railway Society (C&SRS) was formed in the 1970s by Ken Simpson and others to try to save some of the lines built by the old NSR, which first began to close in 1964. Their original target was the Biddulph Valley route which branched north from the Stoke-Leek line at Milton Junction, and headed north to Biddulph Wharf and Congleton, but Cheshire County Council showed only lukewarm interest. Leek station was also considered for a heritage line north of Rudyard Lake but was demolished in 1973. The society then aimed to re-open the Oakamoor to Alton Towers section, using the former Oakamoor Tunnel for stock storage.

The council intended to demolish the station at Cheddleton in April 1974, but local businessman and parish councillor Norman Hancock parked his car on the level crossing in front of the bulldozers, preventing the demolition. This delay allowed the building to be Grade II listed on 14 May 1974 after a campaign by the C&SRS, Sir John Betjeman and the Victorian Society. In 1976 the former station building was let to the C&SRS to use as a museum.

The C&SRS became the North Staffordshire Railway Society (NSRS), Cheddleton station became Cheddleton Railway Centre, and the Churnet Valley Railway in effect began. The plans for the Oakamoor to Alton Towers track were put on hold, the old siding and goods yard at Cheddleton was purchased, and workshops were created with the first locomotives arriving in 1977. British Rail (BR) was at the time still using the adjacent railway to move industrial sand from the quarry at Oakamoor. This all resulted in the unusual sight of a Fowler tender being delivered to the NSRS at the rear of a sand train, arriving from Bescot, being uncoupled, and then left for the NSRS volunteers to crane over from the mainline into the NSRS yard before the sand train returned.

=== Developments to first running: track bed acquisition (1978–1996) ===
In 1978 the NSRS became the "North Staffordshire Railway Co. (1978) Ltd", which gained charity status in 1983. The bay platform area at Cheddleton was acquired in 1984 and the former NSR signal box from Clifton was put into use at the site, allowing demonstration runs to operate around the former goods yard. A commemorative plaque at the restored station acknowledges Norman Hancock and his role in ensuring the survival of the Jacobean-style building.

British Rail ceased using the remains of the former Churnet Valley Line in 1988, and the NSRC sought to purchase the stretch from Oakamoor to Leek Brook Junction. In 1992, the charity NSRC incorporated a subsidiary company: Churnet Valley Railway (1992) plc. In 1996, the company was granted a light railway order to run 7 miles (11 km) between Leek Brook Junction to Oakamoor Sand Sidings. (This was the last such order before the implementation of a new legal framework in the Transport and Works Act 1992.) The company was also responsible for applications for planning permission and other legal necessities. The first public share issue was launched in 1995, to fund the purchase of the land and track, following an agreement with the British Railways Board. Share Issue 1 was well supported, particularly by the local community, and raised over £120,000. The purchase was completed on 4 July 1996. The trading activities of the NSRC were subsequently transferred to the CVR following this initial success.

The track was then made ready for passenger trains, and on 24 August 1996 LMS Fowler Class 3F 47383 departed Cheddleton for Leek Brook Junction, a distance of roughly 1 mile (1.6 km).

=== New stations: Consall and Kingsley & Froghall (1998–2003) ===
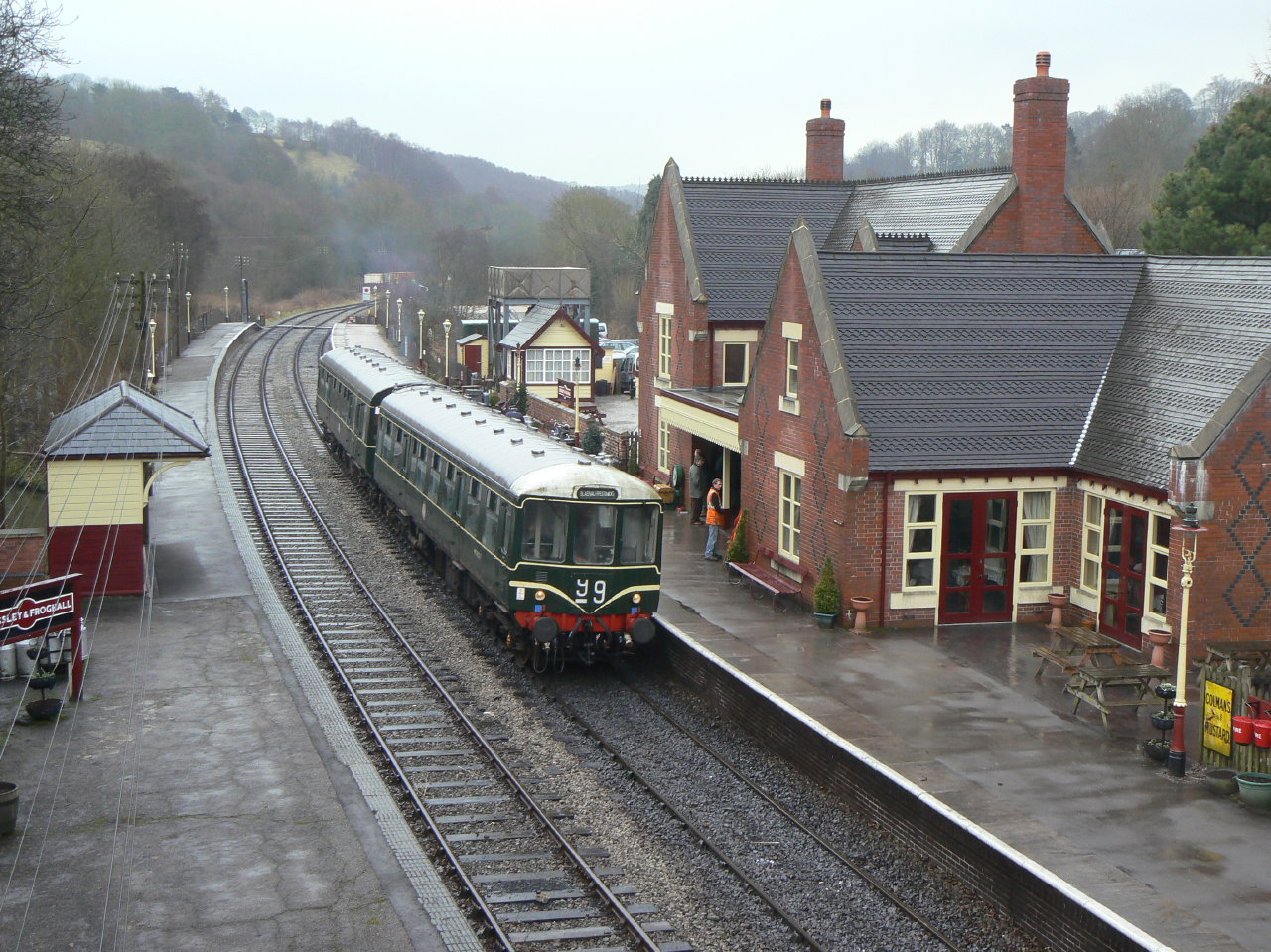
The main station building at Kingsley & Froghall was rebuilt in 2003. The other platform and shelter were re-built in 2007–2009.

Share issue 2 in 1998 aimed to raise £160,000 to upgrade the line south from Cheddleton to Consall for passenger services, which was successfully achieved on 11 July 1998.

Shortly after this, the next two-mile (3.2 km) section south to Kingsley & Froghall station was rehabilitated to provide an alternative to Cheddleton for visitors' car parking, and thus allow the business to expand. The third share issue was launched in the summer of 2000 in order to raise £185,000, and on 14 October 2000 "top and tailed" diesel-hauled passenger specials ran. Floods in November 2000 damaged at least three sections along the extension, but by 11 August 2001 the section of line was restored sufficiently to allow CVR's passenger regular operations to extend over the 5 1/4-mile (8.4 km) line to Kingsley & Froghall, and on 19 July 2003 Kingsley & Froghall's re-constructed station building was opened by Pete Waterman.

=== Upgrades and extension (2008–2011) ===
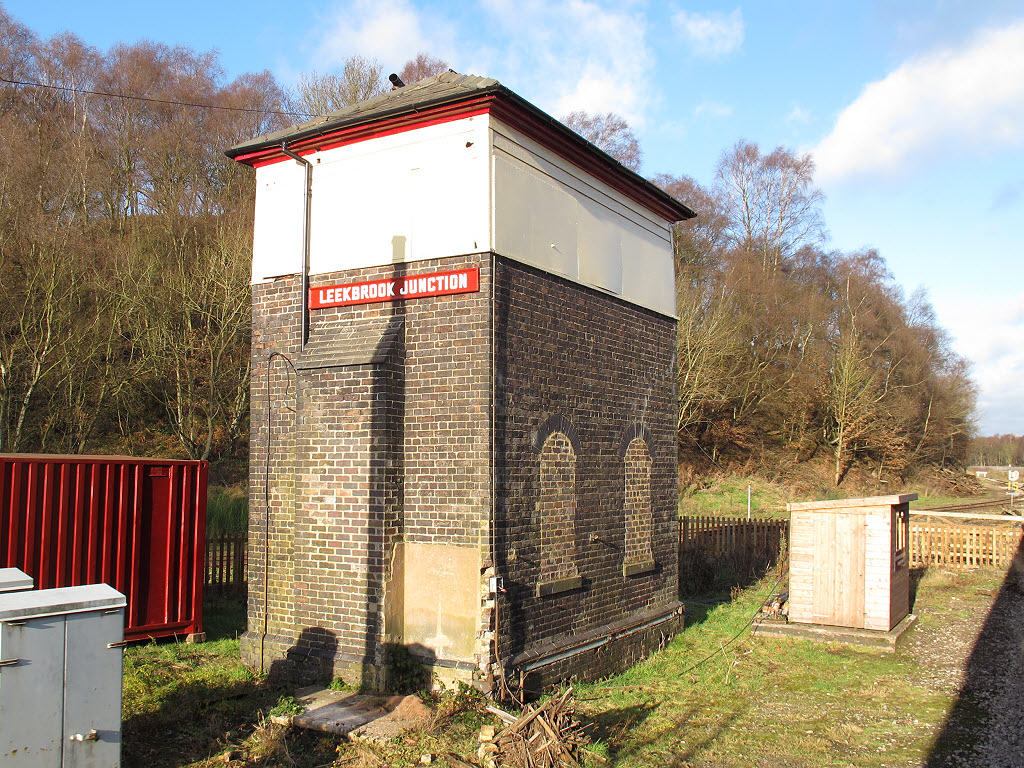
The signal box at Leekbrook Junction in 2011

This single platform at Kingsley & Froghall station was supplemented by the restoration of the second platform in 2008 using grant money. The wooden waiting shelter was re-built to the original 1849 design and incorporated the original brick foundations. A new foot crossing at the south of the platform (there never was a footbridge) replaced a previous foot crossing at the north end. The restoration project jointly won "The National Express East Coast Volunteers Award" at the National Railway Heritage Awards 2008.

In 2010, the 8 1/2 miles (13.7 km) of track from Leek Brook Junction to Cauldon Lowe was restored to passenger-carrying standards, allowing services to run by November. The signal box at Leek Brook Junction was restored externally, and the platform and surrounding area were cleared of vegetation. Planning permission for full restoration of the site was granted in November 2011.

=== Extension to Leek (2018-2025) ===
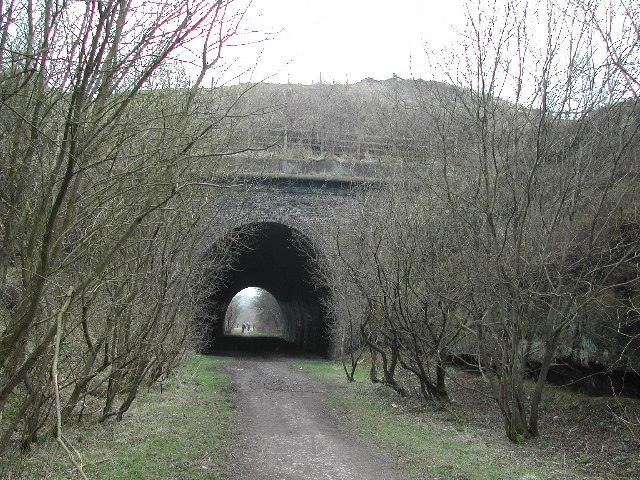
The 69 yards (63 m) Birchall Tunnel, between Leek Brook Junction and Leek in 2010

Also see "Leek (Churnet Valley) railway station" about the future of the proposed station.

It has always been the CVR long-term aim to re-open the line back into the market town of Leek, and after the Froghall extension of 2001 the railway made it clear that the extension into Leek was the next priority in terms of physical expansion.

The CVR have taken on the Leek project themselves, and after much dialogue with the council received outline planning permission for their own proposal in May 2018. They then launched their own project publicly on 1 February 2020. The Railway received a £1.4 million grant from the European Agricultural Fund for Rural Development, and as of the 25 August 2023 have reinstated a rail triangle (only the second in preservation in the UK after Norton Fitzwarren on the West Somerset Railway).

A separate company was proposing redevelopments of the Barnfields estate in Leek, which is the mooted location for the new station. These plans were given Outline Planning Permission in December 2014, and include the construction of a new platform for the railway, new Marina connecting into the Leek branch of the Caldon Canal as well as a new restaurant and potentially a dedicated North Staffordshire Museum.

In late 2024, track laying was largely completed towards Leek, with the first passenger service to the site of the new Leek station planned to run in early 2025 On 31 December 2024, a train operated by Churnet Valley Railway travelled for the first time from Froghall to the new temporary terminus at Leek, carrying 400 invited guests.

== Route of the CVR ==
Most CVR passenger trains run between Kingsley & Froghall station in Froghall village (Kingsley is a further one mile [1.6 km] away) and Ipstones loop via the intermediate stations at Consall, Cheddleton and Leek Brook , passing through the 531-yard (486 m) Cheddleton tunnel and passing over Leek Brook junction, this was a four-way junction serving railways from Stoke, Leek, Alton, and the quarries at Cauldon. The former platform for the old St Edwards Hospital tramway has been restored, and the station building has been reconstructed. Three of the lines through Leek Brook junction have been restored to passenger use, with trains passing through to Leek, Kingsley & Froghall, and Ipstones. Additionally a railway triangle has been restored at the junction allowing trains to be turned. Between Leek Brook junction and Ipstones trains run on the steeply graded Waterhouses branch with a ruling gradient of 1 in 40, easing at Apesford to 1 in 60 for the remainder of the line to Ipstones summit.

== Stations ==
Passengers may join the railway at three stations: Cheddleton, Consall and Kingsley and Froghall.

Cheddleton is the site of the motive power depot, engine shed and the carriage & wagon restoration workshops. The original Victorian station building houses the North Staffordshire Railway museum archive and an original booking office and waiting room, there is a run-round loop of track and a water column.

Consall is a small rural station with Victorian buildings and a waiting room, there is also a passing loop.

Kingsley and Froghall is the main operational headquarters of the railway and where most passengers start their journey, there is a refreshment room and other public facilities on site, as well as a run-round loop and water column.

The CVR's stations at Leek Brook and Leek are in passenger use, but there is no access to the platforms at these stations other than the railway, Leek station currently consists of a temporary platform to facilitate occasional public visits, while Leek Brook has limited public facilities for use on selected event days.

Regular passenger trains terminate at ipstones loop, just short of Ipstones station (closed to passengers in 1935) and ipstones summit which at 1,063 feet (324.0 m) above sea level. was the high point of the entire North Staffordshire railway system.

=== Leek Brook-Waterhouses section ===
- Bradnop
- Ipstones
- Winkhill
- Caldon Low
- Waterhouses
  - Former Leek & Manifold signal box now a cycle hire
  - Start of the Manifold Way footpath and cycle trail

== Awards ==
- 2005: National Railway Heritage Awards, Ian Allan Publishing Award, awarded for Consall station and signalling and Kingsley & Froghall station
- 2008 National Railway Heritage Awards, National Express East Coast Volunteers Award, awarded for the reconstruction of the Up platform and waiting shelter at Kingsley and Froghall. The project was joint first with the Great Central Railway.
- 2013: Winner of "ACES Best Dinner Award 2012"
- 2015: Winner of "Best Use of Production Music in Radio Advertising" at Library Music Awards for Signal1 Radio "1940s Event" advert
- 2016: Winner of Daily Mirror Top 10 UK Steam Train Trips
- 2019: 9th in Telegraph Travel "Best One-Day Rail Journeys in the World"

== Media coverage ==
- In 1983, Simon Groom visited as part of the BBC programme Blue Peter to cover the movement of the former signalbox from Clifton to Cheddleton
- In July 1985, Cheddleton station was used as the fictional Fuddlewich in the BBC series Happy Families starring Jennifer Saunders
- In April 2001, Vince Henderson visited to record the annual wartime event for an episode of Discovery Real Time's Off the Rails
- In September 2011 the line featured in an episode of Countryfile. The railway's diesel multiple unit was used for several interviews on the subject of the British "staycation effect". The programme featured several locations along the line, including Cheddleton & Consall stations and the demolished wire mills at Bolton's (Froghall) adjacent to the railway.
- In September 2012, the railway's diesel multiple unit featured on Ashbourne Radio in a two-part feature on DMU's and their wider impact when introduced to the UK's railways in the late 1950s. The coverage was also used to advertise the railway's diesel gala later that month.
- In January 2016, the railway was included in an episode of Michael Portillo's popular Great British Railway Journeys
- In September 2019, S160 5197 was featured in an episode of UKTV's Train Truckers, following the locomotives transfer from the CVR to Telford Steam Railway for their Polar Express specials.
- In January 2021, Canal Vloggers Foxes Afloat visited the Churnet Valley for an episode, including a ride onboard 33021.
- In November 2021, the railway featured in an episode of Tim Dunn's, The Architecture the Railways Built, which looked at North Staffordshire as whole before focussing on Stoke Station, Alton Towers Station and Leek Brook Junction signal box.

== Future extensions ==
=== Southwards ===
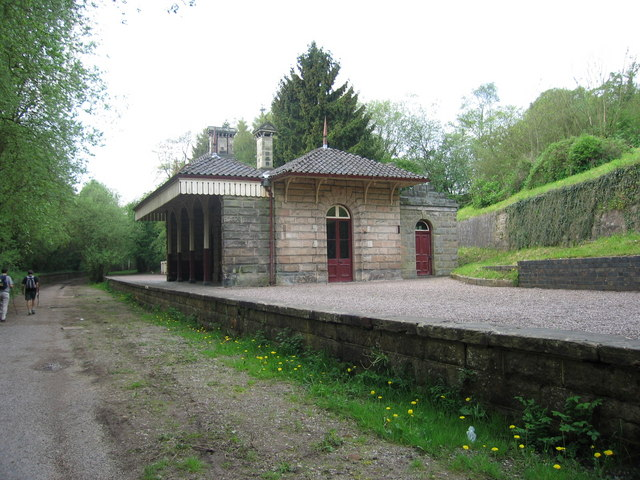
The surviving building near Alton Towers

To the south, from Froghall, the line is under the ownership of the CVR as far as the former sand sidings at Oakamoor even though as of 2024 the trackwork has been lifted. After this the line crossed over the River Churnet straight into a tunnel before Oakamoor station is reached. Work on the tunnel and the rebuilding of the station site would be necessary to extend further than the former quarry, although it is considered viable. Whilst the railway owns the track as far as the sand sidings, the bridge, tunnel and trackbed beyond this is in the hands of Staffordshire County Council.

A new station platform called "Moneystone" (name of the former quarry) has been mooted at the site of the former sand sidings by the CVR to connect to a new Holiday Camp that has been proposed for the former quarry itself

Further south is Oakamoor itself, and then onto Alton Towers, where the station building has been restored although it is owned by the Landmark Trust. The prospect of running trains as far as Alton is potentially lucrative given the tourist potential provided by the popular Alton Towers which is located nearby. This is something of a long-term prospect, however, especially as this section of track now forms part of the National Cycle Network "National Route 54".

This 4-mile (6.4 km) section (from Froghall-Alton Towers) is in principle regarded as commercially viable to reopen, and was stated as a longer-term expansion aim of Moorland & City Railways.

The next station on the route south of Alton is Denstone, and the trackbed is clear of as far as the former platforms then a house has encroached on the former level crossing making expansion beyond Denstone back towards the mainline at Uttoxeter improbable without significant financial outlay.

=== Westwards ===
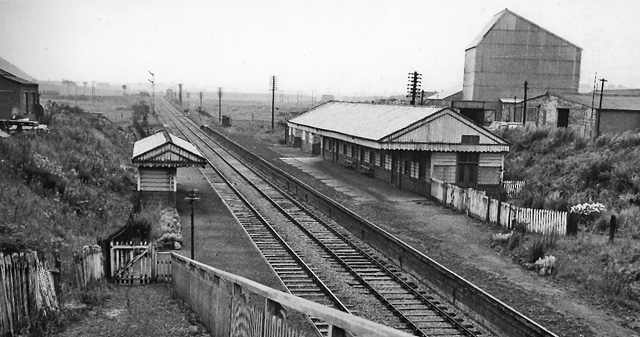
A 1962 view of Bucknall, one of the several demolished stations on the 10-mile (16 km) line to Stoke

West of Leek Brook Junction is the 10-mile (16 km) Stoke–Leek line. The line was part of the planned Moorland & City network and is mothballed by Network Rail pending work to return it to a usable condition.

In January 2012 the CVR publicly announced they were involved in the restoration of the 4 miles (6.4 km) from Leek Brook Junction to Endon Station in collaboration with Moorlands & City Railways. In 2011 vegetation was cleared on the section to allow a comprehensive survey of the track to be undertaken, and in 2012 extensive sleeper replacement began in order to bring the route up to passenger carrying standards. This was being completed by Churnet Valley Railway volunteers, in partnership with Moorland & City Railways, and supported by contractors where necessary.

Work stopped when a local resident made a village green application for the track bed, claiming that the line had become a village green through its lack of use as a railway for a number of years and that many locals used it as a footpath already. This was eventually rejected by Staffordshire County Council, as none of the criteria for village green status were met. Meanwhile, negotiations continued between MCR (plus CVR) and Network Rail to instate a heritage service on a restricted number of dates to Endon. In early 2013 it was announced that the CVR would be looking to take a tenancy out on part of the former station building to open a tea room, in order to create a presence within the village and signal its commitment to returning trains to the station. This tea room was subsequently opened on 13 January 2015 by a local couple and named 'The Station Kitchen'.

== Supporting groups ==
- The North Staffordshire Railway Co. (1978) Ltd. – charitable trust
- Churnet Valley Railway PLC (1992) – operating company
- Anglia Shunters Ltd – maintenance of resident Polish tanks
- Batt Holden Ltd - engineering support
- Churnet Valley Motive Power Department
- Churnet Valley Railway Telecoms Department
- Churnet Valley Railway Permanent Way Department

== Locomotives ==
=== Steam locomotives ===
Number	Name	Type	Livery	Status	Notes	Image
2226	Katie	Andrew Barclay 0-4-0ST	Lined Red	Awaiting Overhaul	Purchased in 2015 by a Churnet Valley Railway volunteer, the locomotive was moved to the CVR with the intention of overhauling it and using it as Cheddleton station pilot. As of the summer of 2020 the locomotive was awaiting an overhaul.	
2871		TKh49 0-6-0	Faded green	Spares Donor	TKh49 2871 was purchased privately from Poland and went to the Bridgend Valleys Railway in the late 1990s. The locomotive was stored until it was purchased by the owner of TKh 2944 as a source of spare parts. The loco was moved to the Churnet Valley Railway in April 2014, where it is currently stored pending the commencement of its overhaul.	Locomotive TKH 2871 - geograph.org.uk - 4436578
2944	Hotspur	TKh49 0-6-0	Green	Stored	2944 was put up for sale in 2011, and following a lengthy period with no suitable offers an article appeared in a copy of Steam Railway magazine saying that the locomotives would be sent for scrap if no buyer was found. A group of Churnet Valley Railway volunteers stepped in to purchase the locomotive, with the view of restoring and operating it at the CVR. 2944 arrived in May 2013 and the overhaul commenced in August of the same year. After 9 months, the overhaul was completed and the locomotive entered traffic during the Churnet Valley Railways "Anything Goes" weekend on the 21st June 2014. Withdrawn for overhaul following expiration of boiler ticket in January 2024.	
3278	Franklin D. Roosevelt	S160 2-8-0	Longmoor Blue	Operational	Under Stewardship of Batt Holden Ltd. Arrived at Cheddleton December 2020 ahead of completion of overhaul. First moves in steam completed in July 2024. Now the railway's main steam locomotive pulling the trains.	
5197		S160 2-8-0	USATC Black	Awaiting overhaul	Owned by Batt Holden Ltd. Removed from traffic in summer 2026 for ten year overhaul .	
6046		S160 2-8-0	USATC Black	Operational	Owned by Batt Holden Ltd. Returned from Tyseley in early 2016 following repairs. Similarly to S160 No. 5197, this locomotive also operates Polar Express events. Withdrawn from service in March 2022, returned to service following overhaul in October 2023. Currently on loan to the Chinnor & Princes Risborough Railway.	
44422		4F 0-6-0	BR Black	Awaiting repair	Built in 1927 under the LMS, and was withdrawn by BR in June 1965. First former BR steam locomotive to arrive at CVR from Barry Scrapyard in April 1977. First returned to steam in 1990, the locomotive spent periods out on hire until the CVR was formally re-opened in 1996. An overhaul was required in 2000, after which she continued to perform at the CVR and made visits to other railways before she was moved to the Nene Valley Railway in 2009. The boiler ticket expired in July 2013 following failure of the crown stays, but in December 2014 a 25-year lease was signed with the West Somerset Railway that would see the 4F restored for the 50th Anniversary of the closure of the Somerset and Dorset Joint Railway in 2016. In 2019, the agreement with the WSR was terminated and the locomotive returned to the Churnet Valley in December that year. It is currently out of service requiring major bottom end repairs and awaits an assessment.	
48173		8F 2-8-0	N/A	Undergoing restoration	Owned by Batt Holden Ltd. Long-term project. Parts accumulation has been ongoing and restoration began in earnest in 2017.	
3839	Wimblebury	Austerity 0-6-0ST	Blue	Operational	Built in 1956. Arrived on loan from Foxfield Railway in June 2026, purchased by CVR in summer 2026 with intention of making locomotive available for hire.	
6435		GWR 6400	BR lined green with late crest	Under overhaul	Built in April 1937, purchased from West Somerset railway in summer 2026 with intention of locomotive being available for hire on completion of overhaul.	

=== Diesel locomotives ===
Number	Name	Type	Livery	Status	Notes	Image
6	Roger H. Bennett	Yorkshire Engine Company Janus 0-6-0	NCB Blue	Operational	NSRC owned. Returned to traffic after a cosmetic overhaul.	
D3800		Class 08	BR Green	Under overhaul	Privately owned. Arrived December 2016 for initial 5-year period in EWS livery (08633).	
D8057		Class 20	BR Green	Under Overhaul	Privately owned. Arrived December 2016 and overhaul underway. A set of lifting jacks have been acquired by the railway and were refurbished in December 2022, which will allow for the overhaul of the bogies and for the fixing of the cab.	British Rail Class 20 D8057 (TOPS 20057)
25322	Tamworth Castle	Class 25	"Ice Cream Van" Blue	Awaiting overhaul	Privately owned. Built in 1967. Cosmetically restored in 2009 for an EMRPS photo charter. Awaiting completion of Class 20 before overhaul commences.	
33021	Eastleigh	Class 33	Post Office Red	Out of Traffic	Built in 1960. On loan from private owner.	33021 taken during the Old Oak Common Open Day on 05 Aug 2000
33102	Sophie (Unofficial)	Class 33	BR Blue	Operational	NSRC owned. Built in 1960. By the end of 2009, 33102 was in need of restoration and refurbishment. After a lengthy overhaul which included extensive body work, a rewire, new internal guttering and drains, replacement of cant rail grilles, complete strip down and overhaul of the compressor, new batteries and a complete repaint 33102 returned to traffic in time for the CVR's 2012 diesel weekend.	33 102 waits to depart from Cheddleton
D1994 (47292)	Her Majesty's Railway Inspectorate 175	Class 47	BR 2 tone green	Operational	Built in 1966 at Crewe as D1994. On loan for an initial period of 5 years, arriving on 22 June 2022. The loco entered traffic in 2025 and was named in a ceremony on the 17th of April 2026.	47292 Ruddington

=== Former residents ===
Number	Type	Livery	Status	Notes	Image
80136	4MT 2-6-4T	BR Lined Black	Operational	Built in 1956. After leaving Cheddleton, the locomotive operated on the Llangollen Railway until its boiler ticket expired. The locomotive was stored until 2016 when the owners agreed to move it to the North Yorkshire Moors Railway. The locomotive arrived at the NYMR in April 2016 and was operational by August 2016.	
No 2	NSR New L Class 0-6-2T	NSR Lined Maroon	On Display	In 1960 the locomotive was repainted as NSR No 2 for the "North Staffordshire Railway Centenary" exhibition in Stoke-on-Trent. Following the loco's appearance at this event it kept its identity as NSR no. 2 upon its return to industrial service at Walkden. In 1964 the boiler, tanks and cab from "Princess" were fitted onto the chassis of another former NSR New L loco (NSR no. 72 built in 1920 / LMS no. 2262—had been subsequently named "Sir Robert" at Walkden). The NSR no. 2 identity was maintained, however, and upon the end of service at Walkden the loco passed into the National Collection. This has created a high level of debate over the loco's identity though, as traditionally locomotives took their numbers from their frames which would make the surviving loco NSR no. 72. As 'New L' class all had superheated boilers, the fact the loco survives with a saturated boiler takes the discussion much further as to whether it can even be classed as a NSR loco. The surviving loco was owned by the National Railway Museum and spent a period on display at the CVR in the late 1990s. Following some time on display at Shildon Locomotion Museum it was delisted from the National Collection, and donated to the Foxfield Railway where it is now on display in their museum at Caverswall Road. Its identity as NSR no. 2 has been maintained throughout its life in preservation.	
NSR No. 1 / BEL2	Battery Electric 0-4-0BE	NSR Lined Maroon	On Display	Built at Stoke Works in 1917. It worked Bolton's copper works and sand sidings at Oakamoor on the Churnet Valley Line. It was the last North Staffs locomotive to be withdrawn, leaving BR stock in 1963.	
7821	GWR Manor Class 4-6-0	BR Black	On Display – Awaiting Overhaul	Named 'Ditcheat Manor' and built in 1950. Operated on the railway from 2005 to 2007 before expiry of her boiler ticket. On display at Museum of the Great Western Railway following purchase by the West Somerset Railway Association in 2008 from Ken Ryder.	
3777 / 68030	Hunslet 0-6-0ST	BR Black	Awaiting overhaul	Built in 1952. Ran the first demonstration trains operated at the Cheddleton Railway Centre in 1977, where it was named Josiah Wedgewood. The locomotive was painted into pseudo BR Livery as 68030 and spent many years out on hire at various railways after leaving the CVR in 2006. 68030 returned to the CVR in May 2016 following ten years away but left again in early 2017, this time for the Llangollen Railway.	
69621	LNER Class N7 0-6-2T	BR Black	Under Overhaul	Owned by the East Anglian Railway Museum. Arrived on the CVR in June 2012, and became the mainstay of services until withdrawal in April 2015 for overhaul. Hoped to return to service in 2024.	

== Accidents and incidents ==
On 17 April 2026, an empty stock train was derailed at Cheddleton. The Rail Accident Investigation Branch was informed of the incident. Train services were suspended on 17 and 18 April, and resumed as scheduled on 22 April.
