= Cheddleton railway station =

Preserved railway station in Staffordshire, England

Cheddleton
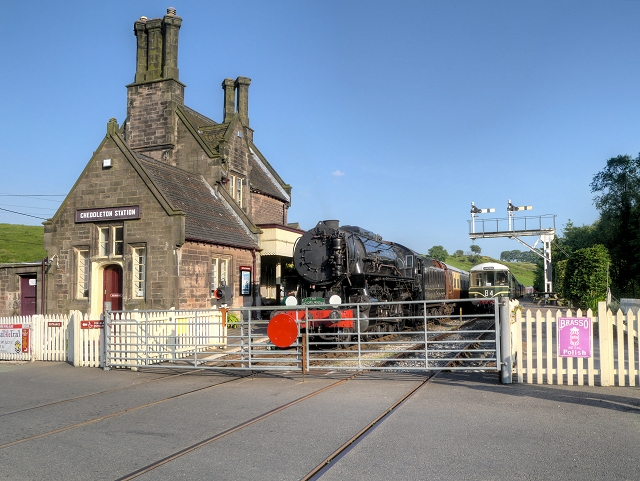
- Cheddleton station and level crossing

General information
- Location: Cheddleton, Staffordshire Moorlands; England
- Coordinates: 53.0658°N 2.0274°W
- Grid reference: SJ982520
- System: Station on Churnet Valley Railway
- Operator: Churnet Valley Railway
- Platforms: 2

History
- Original company: North Staffordshire Railway
- Post-grouping: London, Midland & Scottish Railway

Key dates
- 1 September 1849: opened
- 4 January 1965: closed
- 1996: re-opened (preservation)
Location

Cheddleton railway station is a railway station that serves the village of Cheddleton in Staffordshire, England. It is the headquarters of the Churnet Valley Railway.

== History ==
The station is situated on the Churnet Valley Line of the North Staffordshire Railway, which was opened to passengers and goods on 1 September 1849.

The station was a quiet country station, and as with many stations in the UK in the 1960s, levels of traffic decreased to such an extent that the station was considered non-viable and closed to both passengers and goods in 1965.

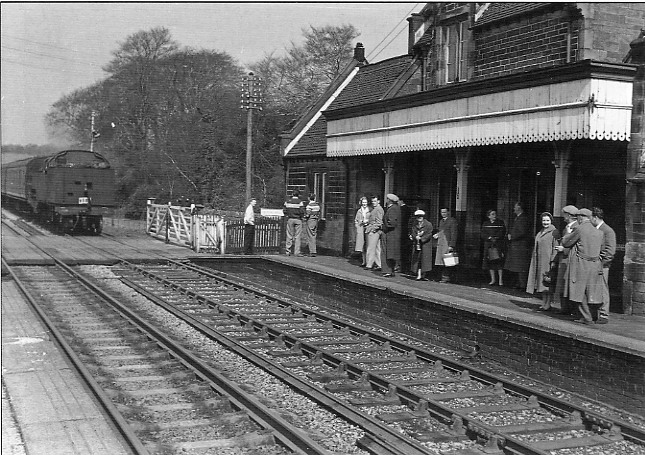
Cheddleton before closure

== Churnet Valley Railway early days ==
During the 1970s, a railway preservation base was established at Cheddleton railway station. This was due to a campaign by local people, spearheaded by local businessman and resident Norman Hancock, who, in May 1974, as a mark of protest, parked his Jaguar car on the level crossing where the railway line meets Basford Bridge Lane in Cheddleton. Following his actions and with support from a local campaign, the station building was saved from demolition and became a grade II listed building on 14 May 1974. Cheddleton Station later became the base of the Churnet Valley Railway and has a commemorative plaque dedicated to Hancock on the wall.

Initially, there was a railway museum displaying artefacts relating to the North Staffordshire Railway. In 1978, the NSRS became the North Staffordshire Railway Co. (1978) Ltd, and it became a charity in 1983.

Later, the bay platform area was acquired in 1984, and a former NSR signal box was put into use. The Churnet Valley line finally closed for sand traffic in 1988, and the NSRC jumped at the chance to purchase the line from British Rail by publicising its share prospectus.

The first passenger train to leave Cheddleton onto the mainline under CVR control left for Leek Brook on 24 August 1996.

== Later developments ==
Since the first trains ran in 1996, the CVR has grown with Cheddleton remaining its headquarters. The station area has benefited from temporary buildings on the opposite side of the original, housing a shop and a tea room. The yard to the south of the platforms has progressively expanded with several roads, an inspection pit, and a carriage shed being some of the facilities now in use, as well as the main engine shed that was built early on. Recently, the second platform has been reconnected to the main line by means of a siding, which will one day form a loop to pass trains on.

== Cheddleton tunnel ==
Just to the north of the station lies the 531-yard (485.5 m) long Cheddleton Tunnel.

== See also ==
- Listed buildings in Cheddleton

== Route ==
Preceding station	Heritage railways	Following station
Leek Brook	Churnet Valley Railway	Consall
	Historical railways	
Leek Brook	Churnet Valley Line	Consall
