= Oakamoor Tunnel =

Railway tunnel in Staffordshire, England

Coordinates: 52.9976°N 1.9219°W

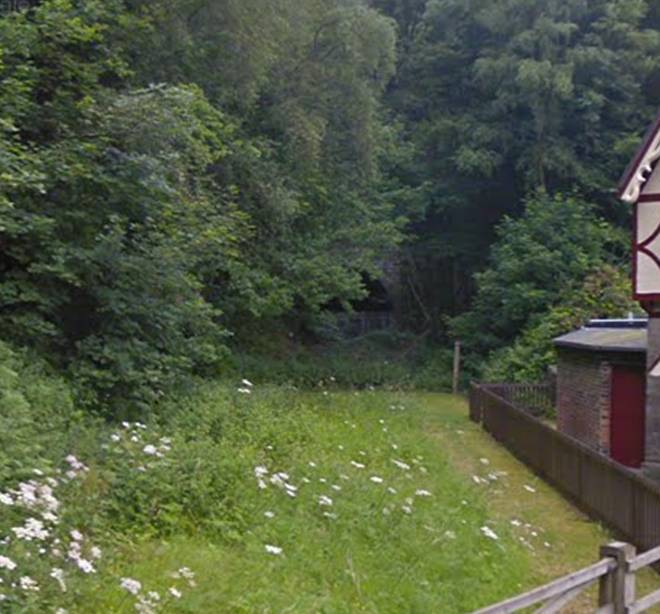
South entrance to Oakamoor Tunnel near to Oakamoor Station

Oakamoor Tunnel is a disused 497-yard (454 m) long tunnel located north of Oakamoor railway station on the former Uttoxeter to North Rode section of the North Staffordshire Railway.

The tunnel opened with the line in 1849. The tunnel was closed in 1964 with the withdrawal of passenger and freight service between Uttoxeter and Oakamoor Sand Sidings (just north of the tunnel).

The tunnel is complete, but is in poor condition with clear signs of deterioration.
