= Caldon Canal =

Waterway in England

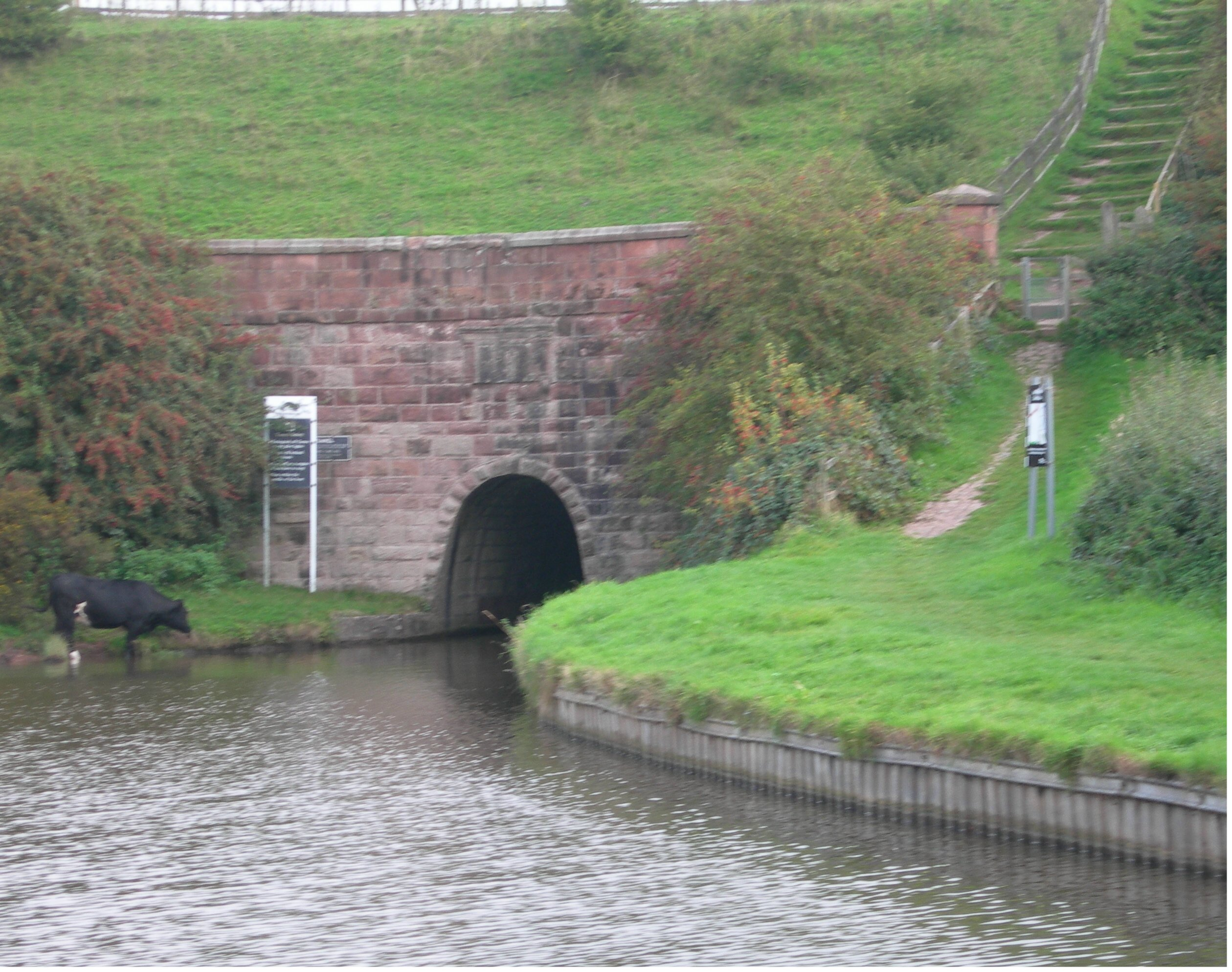
- The southern portal of Leek Tunnel
- Interactive map of Caldon Canal

Specifications
- Length: 18 miles (29 km)
- Maximum boat length: 72 ft 0 in (21.95 m)
- Maximum boat beam: 7 ft 0 in (2.13 m)
- Locks: 17 (originally 17)
- Status: Navigable
- Navigation authority: Canal and River Trust

History
- Original owner: Trent and Mersey Canal Company
- Date of act: 1776
- Date completed: December 1778
- Date restored: 1974

Geography
- Start point: Froghall
- End point: Etruria, Stoke-on-Trent
- Branches: Leek, Uttoxeter Canal
- Branch of: Trent and Mersey Canal

Caldon Canal is a branch of the Trent and Mersey Canal which opened in 1779. It runs 18 miles (29 km) from Etruria, Stoke-on-Trent, to Froghall, Staffordshire. The canal has 17 locks and the 76-yard (69 m) Froghall Tunnel.

== History ==
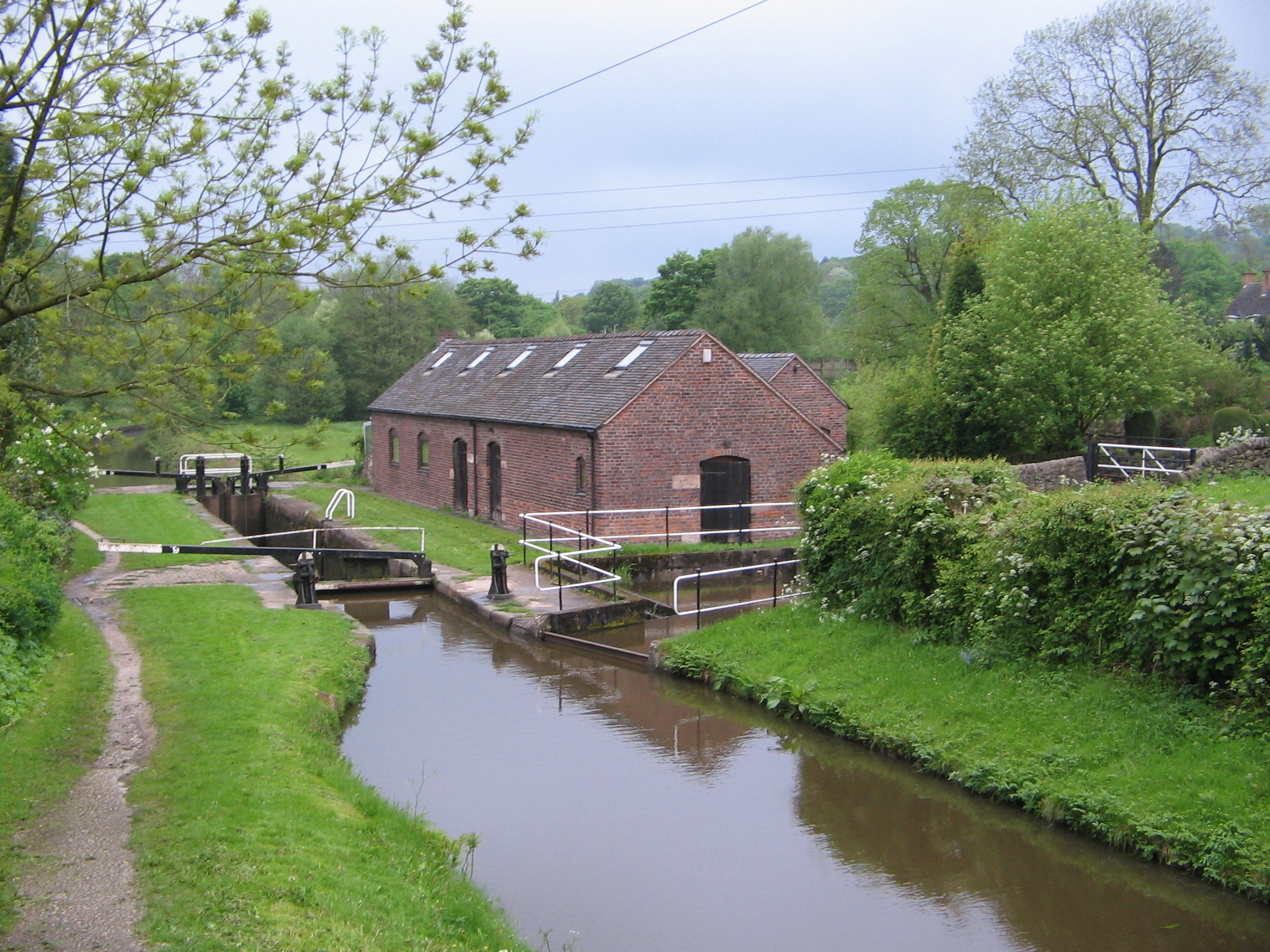
The canal at Top Lock on the Stockton Brook flight

The first plans by the proprietors of the Trent and Mersey Canal Company to construct a canal from the summit level to Leek were considered in January 1773. This would have been a tub-boat canal, as the boats were designed to carry just 5 tons, and rather than using locks, inclined planes were to be used at points where the level of the canal needed to change. Two more plans were considered, and the third included extra reservoirs which would supply the summit level of the existing main line. At a similar time, an independent company was planning a link to Leek, but the Trent and Mersey managed to block this. Having secured contracts with several owners of limestone quarries in the Cauldon Low area, the company sought an act of Parliament to authorise construction of the new works, which it obtained as the Trent and Mersey Canal Act 1776 (16 Geo. 3. c. 32) in May 1776.

Trent and Mersey Canal Act 1776
- Act of Parliament
- Parliament of Great Britain
- Long title: An Act to enable the Company of Proprietors of the Navigation from the Trent to the Mersey, to make a navigable Canal from the said Navigation on the South Side of Harecastle, in the County of Stafford, to Froghall, and a Rail-way from thence to or near Caldon, in the said County; and to make other Rail-ways.
- Citation: 16 Geo. 3. c. 32
- Territorial extent: Great Britain

Dates
- Royal assent: 13 May 1776
- Commencement: 26 October 1775 (Note: Start of session.)
- Repealed: 22 April 1931
Other legislation
Amended by	Trent and Mersey Canal Act 1783
Repealed by	Trent and Mersey Canal Act 1831
Relates to	Caldon Canal Act 1797

Status: Repealed

Text of statute as originally enacted

The act enabled the proprietors to borrow £25,000 to fund the construction, which was completed in December 1778. Initially, there were 16 locks, eight rising from Etruria to the start of the summit at Stockton, and eight falling from the end of the summit to Froghall. 1.5 miles (2.4 km) of the canal followed the bed of the river Churnet near Consall. The company could also build railways to the quarries, and the first, which ran from Froghall across Shirley Common towards the quarries opened at the same time as the canal, but was not a success. A second act of Parliament, the Trent and Mersey Canal Act 1783 (23 Geo. 3. c. 33), was obtained to authorise a new tramway, and to extend the canal by 530 yards (480 m), which included the Froghall tunnel. The tramway was 3.1 miles (5.0 km) long, and was funded out of revenue, as the act did not authorise the raising of additional capital.

Caldon Canal Act 1797
- Act of Parliament
- Parliament of Great Britain
- Long title: An act to enable the company of proprietors of the navigation from the Trent to the Mersey, to make a navigable canal from and out of a certain branch of their said navigation, called, The Caldon Canal, at or near Endon, to or near the town of Leek, in the county of Stafford; and also a reservoir for supplying the several canals of the said company with water.
- Citation: 37 Geo. 3. c. 36
- Territorial extent: Great Britain

Dates
- Royal assent: 24 March 1797
- Commencement: 24 March 1797 (Note: The Acts of Parliament (Commencement) Act 1793.)
- Repealed: 22 April 1931
Other legislation
Amended by	Trent and Mersey Navigation Act 1823
Repealed by	Trent and Mersey Canal Act 1831

Status: Repealed

Text of statute as originally enacted

Traffic on the Trent and Mersey main line was such that it suffered from water shortage in dry periods, and water levels on the Caldon branch were often too low at such times, as the water was used to keep the main line moving. In 1796, the company wanted to build a reservoir at Rudyard, to improve the situation, and a branch to Leek was included in the bill, as it was the only way to obtain the consent of the Leek authorities and landowners for the reservoir. The bill was defeated in Parliament, after which the Peak Forest Canal Company proposed to build a branch of their canal from Marple to Leek, and on to join the Caldon branch. It would also have included a reservoir at Rudyard, but the plan was short-lived, as the Trent and Mersey succeeded in getting their bill passed when they submitted it to Parliament for a second time in 1797, when the Caldon Canal Act 1797 (37 Geo. 3. c. 36) was passed.

To ensure that the water from Rudyard could be used to supply the main line, the Leek branch had to join the top level of the Caldon branch, and so the original route with the three Park Lane locks was closed and a new route built, with a three-lock staircase between the junction and the old line of the canal. This was altered again in 1841 to the present arrangement, where the canal to Froghall passes under an aqueduct on the Leek branch, and three separate locks at Hollinhurst raise the old line up to the summit level.

With the coming of the railways, the Trent and Mersey Company canals were sold to the North Staffordshire Railway, with the formal takeover occurring on 15 January 1845. They were keen to promote the canals and railways as mutual feeders, and so maintained the canals, with the exception of the Uttoxeter branch, which was closed by section 37 of the North Staffordshire Railway Act 1847 (10 & 11 Vict. c. cviii), obtained in July 1847, so that the Churnet Valley Railway could be built along its course. The tramway from Froghall to Cauldon Quarries was replaced by a new cable-operated railway in 1849. It included inclined planes at Froghall, Oldridge and Cotton, and was built to a gauge of 3 ft 6 in (1,067 mm). Trains consisted of up to nine waggons, each capable of holding 6 tons of limestone, and around 1,000 tons a day were moved from the quarries to the canal.

Traffic gradually moved away from the canal to the railways. In 1904, Endon basin was built, where limestone brought from the quarries by the railway could be transferred to boats. One of the major users of the limestone, based at Sandbach, closed in 1920, and the cable railway to Froghall closed in the same year. Limestone was no longer transhipped at Endon from 1930, and the canal saw virtually no traffic. Responsibility for the canal passed to the London, Midland and Scottish Railway in 1940, who closed the Leek branch under the London Midland and Scottish Railway (Canals) Act 1944 (8 & 9 Geo. 6. c. ii). The last heavy commercial traffic was the transfer of coal from Endon to Cheddleton, which ceased in 1952.

Johnson Brothers built three new, specialised barges, Milton Maid, built in 1967, Milton Queen in 1973, and Milton Princess in 1978, to convey pottery over a 2.5-mile (4 km) stretch of the canal from its factory in Milton to a new packaging plant near the Ivy House lift bridge in Hanley. The experiment was a success: transport by water reduced costs by 50 per cent and diminished the number of breakages of wares. Operation continued until 1990, becoming one of the last commercial narrowboat runs.

=== Operation ===
Because the Caldon Canal was promoted and built by the proprietors of the Trent and Mersey Canal Company, as such it is more properly called the Caldon Branch of that canal. It was built to carry limestone from Caldon Low Quarries which was transported to Froghall wharf via three inclined tramways. Other important traffic for the canal was coal from the Cheadle Coalfield and ironstone from the several iron ore mines in the Churnet valley and Kingsley area. The canal was subject to considerable mining subsidence in the Etruria area, which eventually led to the need for an entirely new lock, Planet Lock, with a rise of just 3 feet (0.91 m), to adjust the levels. Water to the canal is supplied by three reservoirs and the River Churnet. Stanley reservoir holds 22 million cubic feet (670 Megalitres (Ml)), and joins the canal just below Endon basin, while Knypersley holds 41 million cubic feet (1,200 Ml) and joins the canal above Engine Lock. The final section of its feeder was originally the Norton Green branch, a private canal built at the same time as the main line, to service a colliery. Rudyard reservoir holds 122 million cubic feet (3,500 Ml), and its feeder, which joins the Leek branch near the Churnet aqueduct, follows much of the proposed route of the Macclesfield Canal extension to Leek. Since the Caldon joins the summit level of the Trent and Mersey system, it is still a valuable supply for that canal too.

=== Restoration ===
Although the canal was never legally closed, its traffic had declined to such an extent that by the 1960s it was almost unusable. A survey of it was carried out in 1960 by the Inland Waterway Protection Society, which had been formed in 1958 in response to the Bowes Committee report, which listed many canals which it thought should no longer be maintained. In April 1959, the government created the Inland Waterways Redevelopment Advisory Committee, whose responsibility was to assist schemes to redevelop canals that were no longer commercially viable, and the survey formed the basis of a submission to that committee. With further threats of closure in 1961, the Stoke-on-Trent boat club organised a public meeting in Hanley and a cruise along the canal to Froghall in September. This attracted press coverage and local council support. There was then a proposal by the Caldon Canal Committee for the National Trust to take over the waterway, and although this did not occur, the committee became the Caldon Canal Society, and worked with the British Waterways Board towards its eventual restoration.

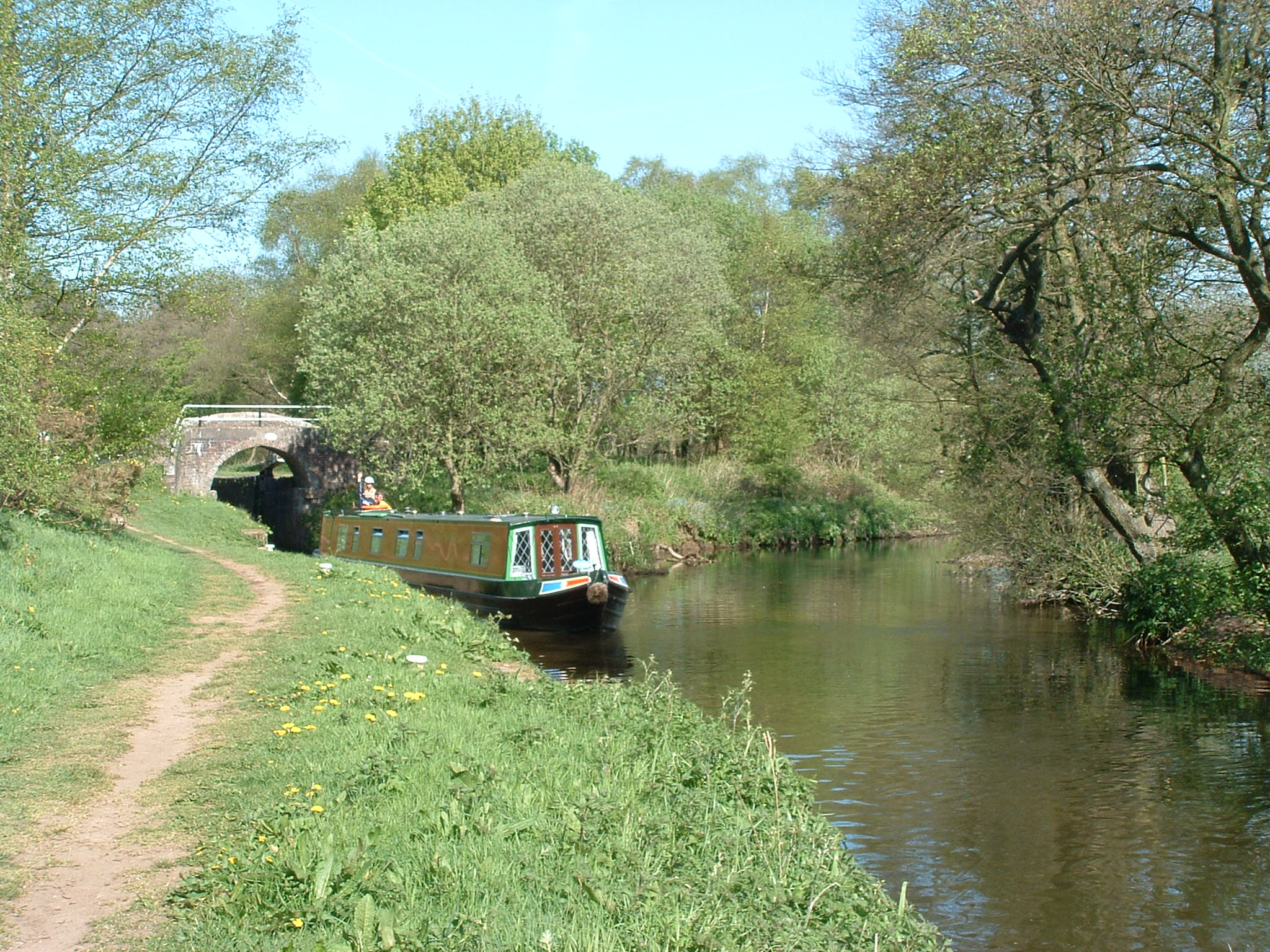
A narrowboat has just locked down into the Churnet river at Oak Meadow Ford lock

Staffordshire County Council and Stoke-on-Trent City Council announced that they would make contributions towards the restoration in 1969. The Inland Waterways Association held a boat rally at Endon in May 1971, to publicise the need to restore the canal, and in February 1972 the government introduced a scheme to help local authorities to fund work on local facilities that were visually unattractive. Called "Operation Eyesore", it offered grants of up to 85 per cent for the work. Everything was now in place for the restoration, which was officially announced on 22 August 1972.

Restoration of the main line to Froghall was completed in 1974, but the Caldon Canal Society continued to press for more to be done. Agreement was reached on how to finance restoration of the Leek branch in mid-1977, and volunteer work parties began the task of clearing the route so that it could be dredged. The main line from Etruria to Froghall and the Leek Branch were two of seven stretches of canal, formally designated as remainder waterways, which were re-classified by the British Waterways Act 1983. Under the act, a total of 82 route miles (132 km) were upgraded to Cruising Waterway standard.

In 2003, many years of restoration work came to a close as Froghall Wharf, the southern terminus, was reopened to vessels. The work included a new wharf, refurbished toilet facilities and a new visitor centre. A disused lock, actually the first lock on the Uttoxeter Branch (see below), was reopened, as was the basin below it, and moorings for several boats were created. Much of the work was undertaken with volunteer aid, and funded in part by contributions from the European Regional Development Fund.

=== Froghall tunnel ===
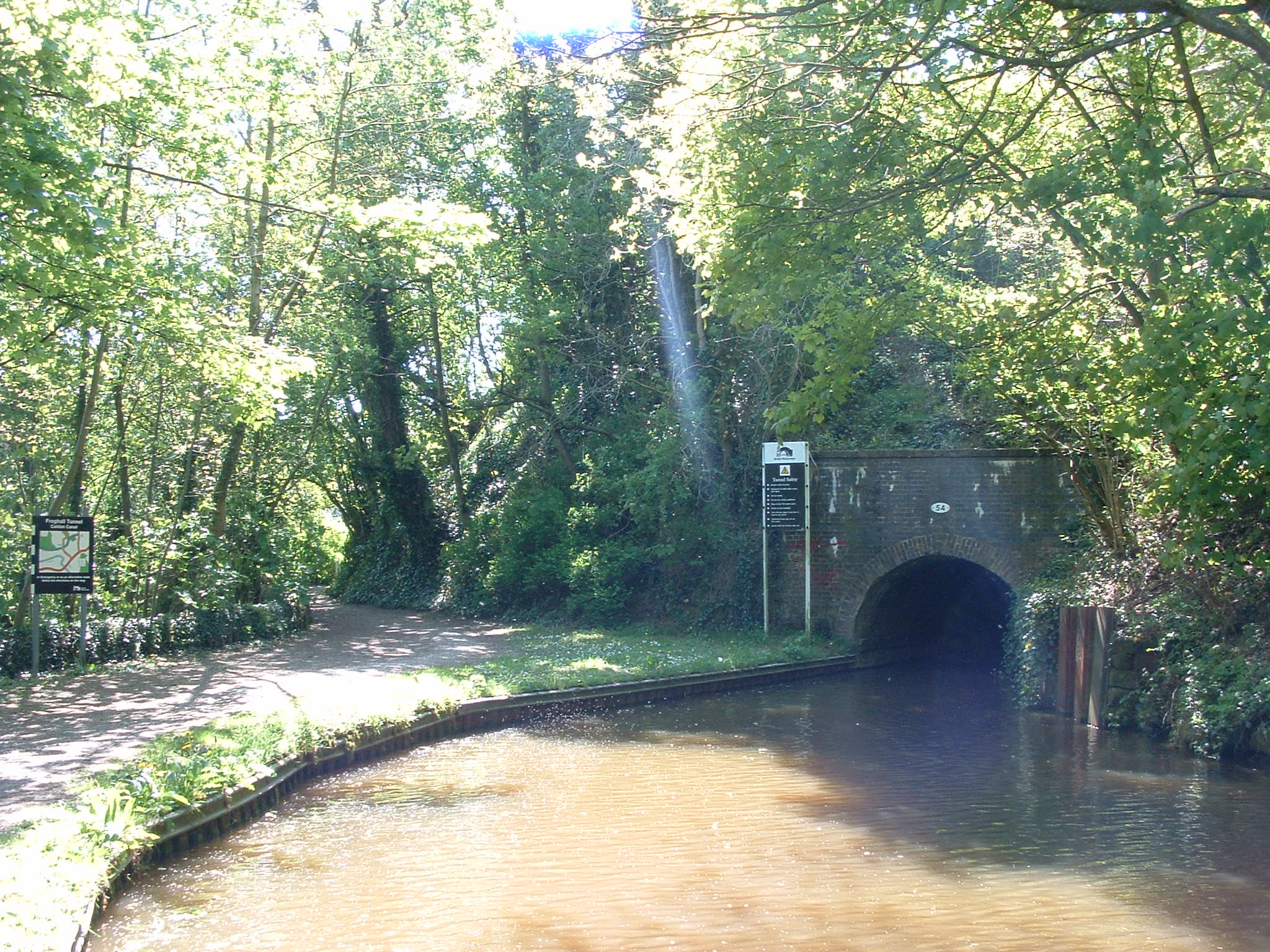
East portal of Froghall Tunnel

Because the roof of the Froghall tunnel has always been extremely low, the 2003 restoration included lowering the water level in the pound after dredging, and thus the headroom in the tunnel was improved to 5 feet (1.5 m) with a beam of 6 feet 8 inches (2.03 m). Unfortunately the new moorings just past the tunnel remain relatively little used, as many modern boats are still too high to pass through the tunnel. A height profile gauge is located at the exit of Flintmill Lock 17 to indicate whether a boat has sufficient clearance to pass through the tunnel. The low height restriction would similarly affect proposals to reopen stretches of the Uttoxeter Canal to boating.

== Description ==
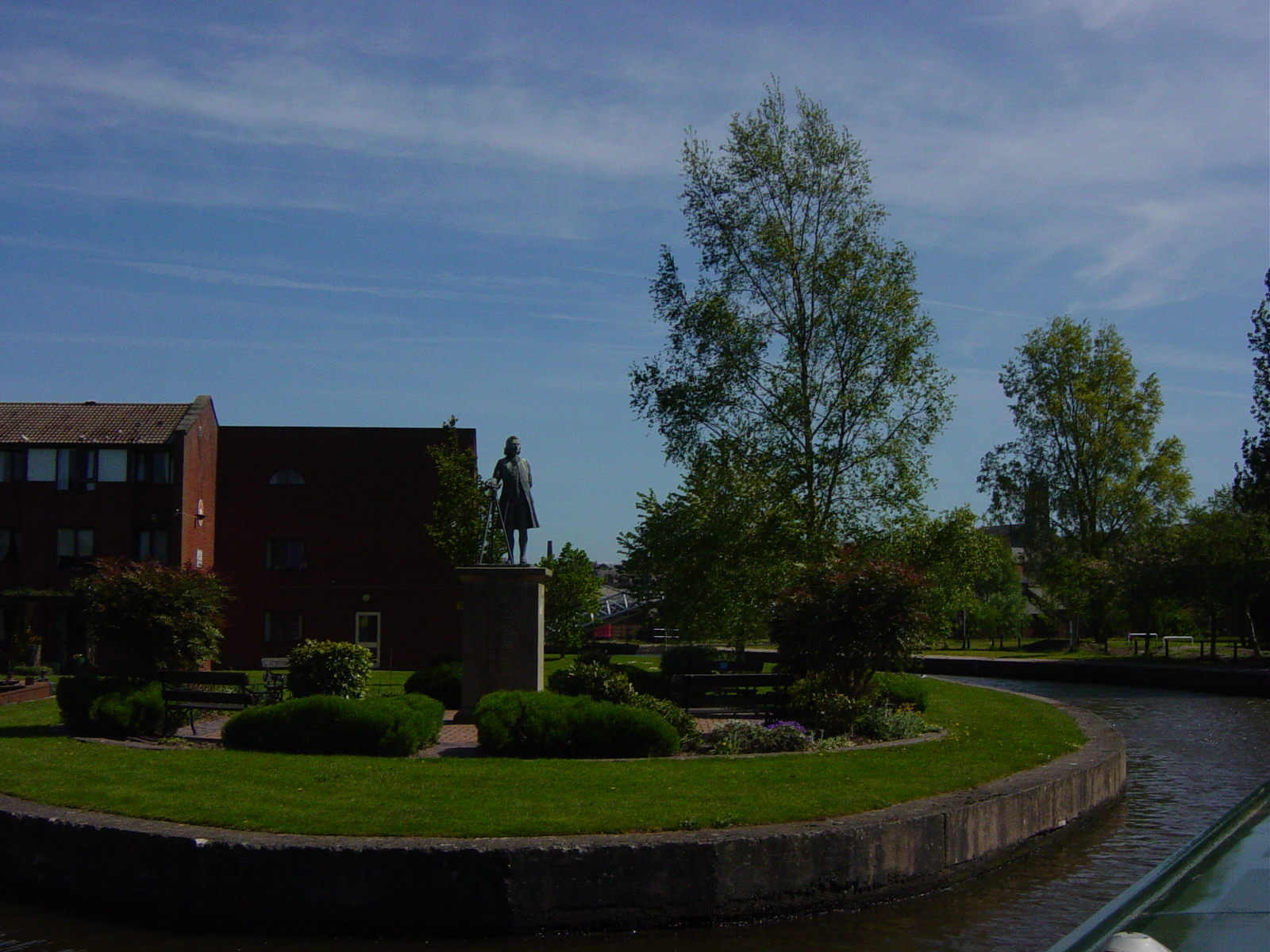
The statue of James Brindley at Etruria, where the canal joins the Trent and Mersey main line

The canal begins at Etruria, Staffordshire, next to the top lock of the Stoke flight on the Trent and Mersey Canal. A statue of James Brindley, the engineer for the Trent and Mersey main line, stands near the junction. Following the course of the infant River Trent, the waterway climbs to a summit level at Stockton Brook, which carries it over the watershed between the Trent and Churnet Valleys. Thereafter the canal descends through locks at Hazelhurst and then Cheddleton, into an initially broad flood plain.

At about a mile above Consall Forge, at Oak Meadow Ford Lock, the canal locks down into the River Churnet for about a mile; the reason for this is that the valley at this point is too narrow to accommodate both canal and river. High river levels can prevent vessels from using this section. At Consall Forge, river and canal part company again, and the canal, which is now only wide enough for a single boat, continues its rural journey to Froghall. The final section, built after the main construction was finished, includes the 76-yard (69 m) Froghall Tunnel, which has limited headroom, immediately followed by Froghall Basin.

== Branches ==
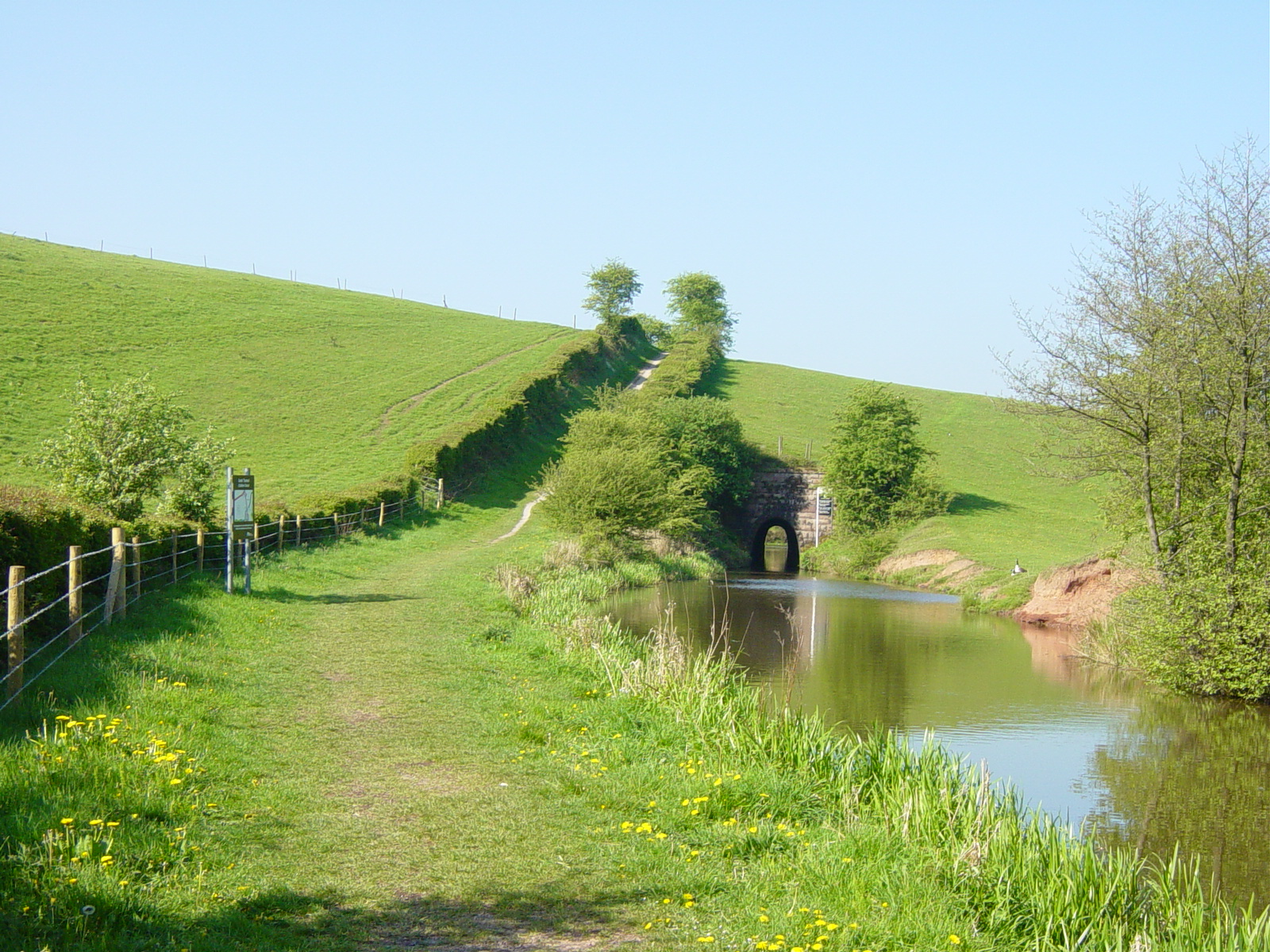
Northern portal of Leek Tunnel

=== Leek ===
The canal has one branch, the Leek Branch, which runs for 3 miles (4.8 km) and includes the 130-yard (120 m) Leek Tunnel. The Leek Branch, opened in 1800/01, meets the main line at Hazelhurst Junction, after crossing the main line on Hazelhurst Aqueduct grid reference SJ954536. Currently the branch ends some way from Leek town centre. The original length of the canal, extending to a basin on the south side of Leek Railway Station, was filled in during the late 1950s/early 1960s to allow for the building of the Barnfields Road Industrial Estate. (When it appeared that Harecastle tunnel, on the Trent and Mersey Canal, might have to close permanently because of mining subsidence, a bypassing connection between the Leek Branch and the Macclesfield Canal at Bosley was mooted; fortunately Harecastle tunnel remains open to navigation.)

A survey has been commissioned to investigate the possibility of extending the branch back into Leek. In November 2009 a breach occurred just beyond the northern portal of Leek Tunnel. This resulted in the end section being closed for eight months while repairs were carried out. The cause of the problem was thought to be an old culvert. While the canal was drained, several other sections of embankment were re-inforced, and the repaired canal was reopened on 5 July 2010.

=== Uttoxeter Canal ===
Originally, the canal also had a further 13-mile (21 km) branch, which opened in 1811. Sometimes referred to as the Uttoxeter Canal, it ran from Froghall as far south as Uttoxeter in Staffordshire and had 17 locks. The canal was never a commercial success and in 1849 much of it was filled in by the North Staffordshire Railway Company and converted into the NSR Churnet Valley line from Leekbrook to Uttoxeter (which itself was finally closed for goods traffic in 1988). This line is still open as far south as Froghall, as a preserved railway, the Churnet Valley Railway.

Further south, at Denstone, several buildings including a church have been built on the line of the canal. Incidentally this branch line had the first automatic, train-operated level-crossing in the UK, at Spath, just outside Uttoxeter. A few bridges from the Uttoxeter branch remain, with the occasional 'milepost', and Uttoxeter still has an area called "The Wharf". The Caldon & Uttoxeter Canals Trust has put forward plans to re-open the Uttoxeter Branch. Part of the old canal bed has been lost underneath JCB's head office and factory at Rocester, so the proposed route diverges from the original canal.

=== Foxley ===
Another much shorter (approximately 800-yard (730 m)) branch of the Caldon main line, the Foxley, ran from Milton in the north east of Stoke-on-Trent through Sneyd Green to Ford Green Iron Works near Smallthorne, where it ended in two parallel basins of 100 yards (91 m) each. What little remains of the Foxley can be found in the Holden Lane Pools nature reserve, as well as alongside the footpath from the reserve to the Elizabethan Ford Green Hall. The position of the former junction is marked, on a sharp bend in the canal, at a pub called The Foxley in Milton.

== Points of interest ==
Point	Coordinates (Links to map resources)	OS Grid Ref	Notes
Froghall Wharf	53.0265°N 1.9624°W	SK026476	Jn with Uttoxeter Canal
Flint Mill Lock (No.17)	53.0333°N 1.9958°W	SK003484	
Oakmeadowford Locks (No.16)	53.0489°N 2.0184°W	SJ988501	
Woods Lock (No.15)	53.0603°N 2.0291°W	SJ981514	
Cheddleton Locks (No.13,14)	53.0697°N 2.0404°W	SJ973525	
Hazelhurst Top Lock (No.10)	53.0812°N 2.0797°W	SJ947537	Jn with Leek Branch
End of Leek Branch	53.0937°N 2.0331°W	SJ978551	Aqueduct over River Churnett
Stockton Brook Top Lock (No.9)	53.0641°N 2.1228°W	SJ918518	Flight of 5 locks
Engine Lock (No.4)	53.0594°N 2.1506°W	SJ900513	
Planet Lock (No.3)	53.0154°N 2.1838°W	SJ877464	
Etruria Staircase Locks (No.1,2)	53.0182°N 2.1897°W	SJ873467	
Etruria Junction	53.0200°N 2.1940°W	SJ870469	Jn with Trent and Mersey Canal

== See also ==
- Canals of Great Britain

== Bibliography ==
- Cumberlidge, Jane (2009). Inland Waterways of Great Britain (8th Ed.). Imray Laurie Norie and Wilson. ISBN 978-1-84623-010-3.
- Dean, Richard (1997). Canals of North Staffordshire (Historical Canal Map series). M and M Baldwin. ISBN 978-0-947712-32-7.
- Edwards, Lewis A. (1985). Inland Waterways of Great Britain (6th Ed,). Imray Laurie Norie and Wilson. ISBN 978-0-85288-081-4.
- Hadfield, Charles (1985). The Canals of the West Midlands. David and Charles. ISBN 978-0-7153-8644-6.
- Harris, Dave (2004). "Spath Level Crossing". samhallas.co.uk. Archived from the original on 16 August 2004.
- Lead, Peter (1980). The Trent and Mersey Canal. Ashbourne. ISBN 978-0-903485-70-8.
- Lead, Peter (1990). Agents of Revolution: John and Thomas Gilbert, Entrepreneurs. Keele. ISBN 978-0-9513713-1-2. (Extensive discussion of the Trent and Mersey Canal system including the roles of John and Thomas Gilbert, of Cotton, Staffordshire.)
- Lead, Peter (1990). The Caldon Canal and Tramroads (2nd enlarged ed.). Oakwood Press. ISBN 978-0-85361-404-3.
- Nicholson (2006). Nicholson Waterways Guide (Vol 4). Harper Collins Publishers Ltd. ISBN 978-0-00-721112-8.
- Squires, Roger (2008). Britain's restored canals. Landmark Publishing. ISBN 978-1-84306-331-5.
- Ware, Michael E. (1989). Britain's lost waterways. Moorland Pub.Co. ISBN 978-0-86190-327-6.
