= Listed buildings in Alton, Staffordshire =

Alton is a civil parish in the district of Staffordshire Moorlands, Staffordshire, England. It contains 63 listed buildings that are recorded in the National Heritage List for England. Of these, one is listed at Grade I, the highest of the three grades, six are at Grade II*, the middle grade, and the others are at Grade II, the lowest grade. The parish contains the villages of Alton and Bradley in the Moors and the surrounding countryside. Most of the listed buildings are houses and associated structures, cottages, farmhouses and farm buildings. The River Churnet runs through the parish, and the listed buildings associated with it are a weir and two bridges. The other listed buildings include churches and items in and around the churchyards, the ruins of a castle, public houses, a village lock-up, two mileplates, a well, a school, and a village pump.

== Key ==
Grade	Criteria
I	Buildings of exceptional interest, sometimes considered to be internationally important
II*	Particularly important buildings of more than special interest
II	Buildings of national importance and special interest

== Buildings ==
Name and location	Photograph	Date	Notes	Grade
St Peter's Church; 52.97836°N 1.89187°W		12th century	The church was later altered and extended, it was almost completely rebuilt in 1830, and the chancel and south vestry were added in 1884–85. It is built in stone, and has roofs of tile and slate. The church consists of a nave, north and south aisles, a chancel, a south vestry, and a west tower. The tower has three stages, a west door with a pointed head, clock faces, gargoyles, and an embattled parapet. The north arcade is Norman.	II*
Alton Castle; 52.97931°N 1.89276°W		Late 12th century	The castle was extended in the 13th century, and is now in ruins. The remains include part of the curtain wall, a wall tower, a gatehouse, and an oval bailey. The eastern wall tower is square and has an open back, and all that remains of the 13th-century D-shaped western wall tower are the foundations. The gatehouse has two D-shaped towers rising to a height of about 10 feet (3.0 m), and below the gatehouse is a round-arched sally port. The remains are also a scheduled monument.	I
Fair View, Dimble Lane; 52.97630°N 1.89409°W	—	17th century (probable)	A stone house that has a tile roof with coped verges, two storeys and a basement, and three bays. The windows are casements, there is a basement door, and a flight of stone steps leads up to the ground floor door.	II
The Priest's House, walls and gate piers 52.97881°N 1.89191°W	—	17th century	The building originated as a schoolmaster's house, and it was remodelled and extended in a similar style by A. W. N. Pugin in about 1843. The house is in stone with a tile roof that has crested ridge tiles and coping. Both parts have two storeys, and each has a central gabled porch with a stone slate roof. The earlier part on the left has two bays, and chamfered mullioned windows, those in the ground floor with a continuous hood mould. The doorway in the later part has a four-centred arched head with panelled spandrels, and most of the windows have square heads and lights with four-centred arched heads. The gardens at the front and the rear are enclosed by coped walls, and in the southeast angle is a pair of gate piers.	II
The Rock Cottage; Malthouse Road; 52.97747°N 1.89516°W	—	17th century	A house, later divided into two, it is in stone with a chamfered eaves band, and a tile roof with coped verges on shaped kneelers. There is one storey and an attic, and three bays. In the ground floor are two bowed casement windows and a chamfered mullioned window to the right with a hood mould, and in the attic is a gabled dormer. The original doorway has a massive lintel, and to the left is an inserted doorway with a hood mould. Inside, there is a timber framed partition wall.	II
Cowhouse, Town Head Farm; 52.97919°N 1.88978°W	—	17th century	The cowhouse, which was later extended, is in stone with a tile roof. It has a single storey and five bays, with a single-bay extension to the west. The building has buttresses between the bays, and contains doors, windows, loft doors, a cart entrance, and pigeon holes.	II
Village Fayre, 9 and 11 High Street; 52.97763°N 1.89257°W	—	17th century	A house, later altered and divided into two, it is in stone with a roughcast front, and has a tile roof with coped verges. There are three storeys and three bays. The centre bay projects as a two-storey canted porch, with bow windows on the sides. The windows are mullioned, in the ground floor they are plate glass sashes, the middle floor contains casements, and in the top floor the lights are fixed. There is a door in the porch, another to the left, both with plain surrounds.	II
Red Lion Cottage, Smithy Bank; 52.97659°N 1.89401°W		1657	The house was later remodelled and extended. It is in stone, the front has been partly rebuilt in brick and painted, it has a dentilled eaves course, and a tile roof. There are two storeys and an attic, and three bays. On the front is a gabled porch with a reset datestone, the windows are casements, there is a fire window, and a gable over the left bay. In the right gable end are windows with chamfered mullions.	II
22 and 24 Town Head; 52.97844°N 1.89056°W	—	Late 17th century (probable)	A pair of cottages that were later extended. They are in stone with a tile roof, and have two storeys and an attic, two bays, and an extension to the northwest. The ground floor windows are mullioned with a common hood mould, and between them is a quatrefoil. To the left is a fire window, and the upper floor windows are casements.	II
The Malt House; 52.97655°N 1.89563°W	—	Late 17th century	A house with a granary, and an underground maltkiln and cellars, in red brick with stone dressings, and roofs of tile and slate. The house has a floor band, dentilled eaves, and coped gables. There are two storeys, a basement and attics, and a front of three bays. In the centre is a Tuscan portico, and the windows on the front are sashes with wedge lintels. Across the front of the house is a terrace containing three segmental-arched cellar openings. To the right and at an angle is the attached granary, with quoins, two storeys and a cellar and two bays. At the rear is an external flight of steps, and the rear yard is enclosed by a stone wall containing three square piers with pyramidal caps.	II*
Holme Cottage, Red Road; 52.98192°N 1.90435°W	—	c. 1700	The house, and former stable to the right, are in sandstone with tile roofs. The house has two storeys and an attic, and two bays. The windows in the ground floor are casements, and in the upper floor they have chamfered mullions. The former stable has two storeys and three bays, casement windows, and garage doors. Inside the house is an inglenook fireplace with a chamfered bressumer. The cottage stands on a sandstone outcrop, incorporated into which are three carved heads that are probably medieval.	II
Turnditch Farmhouse; 52.97288°N 1.89894°W	—	1701	The farmhouse is in stone, and has a tile roof with coped verges on shaped kneelers. There are two storeys and an attic, and an L-shaped plan, with a front range of three bays, and a rear wing. The central doorway has a dated lintel, the windows are casements, in the upper floor is a central oval window, the windows in the gable ends have hood moulds, and in the east gable is a lozenge-shaped panel.	II
4 Vicarage Row; 52.97593°N 1.89413°W	—	Early 18th century	A stone house with coved eaves and a tile roof, it has two storeys and three bays. To the left is a gabled porch, and the windows are casements.	II
5 Vicarage Row; 52.97585°N 1.89414°W	—	Early 18th century	A stone house with moulded eaves, and a tile roof with a coped verge. There are two storeys and three bays. The doorway is to the left, and the windows are casements.	II
Ash House, New Road; 52.97750°N 1.89343°W	—	Early 18th century	The house, which was remodelled in the 19th century, is in stone, it has a chamfered eaves band, and a tile roof with a coped verge. There are two storeys and two bays. The windows have chamfered mullions, and contain casements, and the entrance is in the left gable end.	II
Cottage at junction with Denstone Lane; 52.97271°N 1.89087°W	—	Early 18th century	This consists of a house with two attached cottages, the cottages added later in the 18th century. They are in stone and have tile roofs with coped verges. The house has three storeys, a moulded eaves band, and one bay. The doorway has a raised surround, and the windows are casements with chamfered mullions. The cottages have two storeys and three bays, and contain casement windows.	II
Crumpwood Farmhouse and former worker's cottage 52.97952°N 1.87054°W	—	Early 18th century	The farmhouse was later extended, and the cottage was added in the later 18th century. They are in stone with tile roofs. The house has a roof with coped verges, a chamfered eaves course, three storeys, a front range with two bays, and a rear wing, and the windows are mullioned. The former worker's cottage to the east has two storeys, one bay, and a two-storey cross window.	II
Stansmore House, New Road; 52.97746°N 1.89327°W	—	Early 18th century	The house, which was remodelled in the 19th century, is in stone, it has a chamfered eaves band, and a tile roof with coped verges. There are two storeys and three bays. The doorway to the right has a massive lintel, and the windows have chamfered mullions, and contain casements.	II
The Bull's Head Inn, High Street; 52.97738°N 1.89291°W	—	Early 18th century	A private house, later a public house, it is in red brick on a stone plinth, with quoins, a storey band, coved eaves, and a tile roof with coped verges. There are two storeys and an attic, and three bays. The doorway has a bracketed segmental-arched hood, the windows are casements, those in the lower floors with segmental heads, and there are four small attic windows.	II
Vysehouse, High Street; 52.97753°N 1.89244°W	—	Early 18th century	A roughcast house with a fretted eaves fringe, a tile roof, two storeys, and three bays. The doorway has a latticed porch, and the windows are casements with segmental heads.	II
Corner Cottage, Cheadle Road; 52.97603°N 1.89578°W	—	Early to mid 18th century	The house, which was later extended, is in red brick with stone quoins and a tile roof. There are two storeys and an attic, three bays, and a single-bay extension to the left with a coped verge. The central doorway has a segmental head, and the windows are casements, those in the ground floor with segmental heads.	II
Gilbert family memorial 52.97830°N 1.89175°W	—	c. 1741	The memorial is in the churchyard of St Peter's Church. It is a chest tomb in stone, and has a rectangular plan, a chamfered base, panelled sides, panelled corner pilasters, and a fluted frieze. There is a pediment on both sides flanked by acroteria.	II
St Leonard's Church, Bradley in the Moors; 52.96928°N 1.91355°W		1750	The church is built in stone and has a tile roof. It consists of a nave, a chancel, and a west tower. The tower has three stages, a west window, a sundial on the south face, a bracketed eaves cornice, and a plain parapet with corner pinnacles. The windows and other openings have semicircular heads and keystones.	II*
1, 2 and 3 Vicarage Row; 52.97622°N 1.89400°W	—	18th century	A row of three painted cottages, mainly in brick and with one bay in stone, they have a chamfered eaves band, and a tile roof. There are two storeys, and five bays, and the windows are casements, some with segmental heads.	II
Church Farmhouse, wall and mounting block 52.96893°N 1.91214°W	—	Mid 18th century	The farmhouse, which is a remodelling of a 17th-century house, is in stone with a red brick front, a dentilled eaves band, and a tile roof with coped verges. There are two storeys and an attic and four bays, and the windows are horizontal sashes. The garden is enclosed by a brick wall with stone coping, and a stone mounting block is attached to the southwest.	II
Old Grove Cottage; 52.97711°N 1.89316°W	—	18th century	A pair of houses, later combined into one, it is in stone with a tile roof. There are two storeys, an attic and a basement, and three bays. Steps lead up to a doorway on the left, and the windows are casements, some with chamfered mullions.	II
Paradise Farmhouse and stable, Nabb Lane; 52.97123°N 1.88994°W	—	Mid 18th century	The farmhouse, which was extended later, is in red brick on a stone plinth. with stone dressings, quoins, and a tile roof with coped verges on shaped kneelers. The extension is in stone. The house has two storeys and an attic, a storey band, a T-shaped plan, two parallel ranges, and a front of two bays, and the stable is attached to the right. The central doorway has a raised surround and a raised keystone, the windows are casements with chamfered mullions, and the stable has double doors.	II
Sundial; 52.97807°N 1.89180°W	—	18th century	The sundial is in the churchyard of St Peter's Church. It is in gritstone, and consists of a cylindrical shaft with a moulded head on which is a copper dial and gnomon.	II
The Stone House, Malthouse Road; 52.97789°N 1.89474°W	—	18th century	The house is in stone with a tile roof, two storeys, and four bays. On the front is a gabled porch, and most of the windows are casements, those in the ground floor with chamfered surrounds.	II
Stable, The Stone House; 52.97799°N 1.89499°W	—	18th century	The stable is in stone, and has a tile roof with coped veges on kneelers. There is one storey and a loft, and two bays. In the right gable end are external steps leading to a loft door, and the left gable end contains a square pitching hole.	II
The Cottage, Horse Road; 52.97934°N 1.89597°W	—	18th century	A stone house with a chamfered eaves band and a tile roof, it has two storeys and two bays. The windows are two-light casements with chamfered mullions.	II
The White Hart Inn, High Street; 52.97782°N 1.89206°W		18th century	A house, later a public house, it is in painted stone on a plinth, and has a tile roof with a coped verge to the right. There are two storeys and three bays, the right bay taller. The windows are casements.	II
The Hempbutt, Knight Lane; 52.97598°N 1.89494°W	—	Mid to late 18th century	The house, which was extended later, is in stone with a coved eaves band, and a tile roof with coped verges. There are two storeys and six bays, the original three bays to the right. The windows are casements, and the doorway and the window above have chamfered surrounds and four-centred arched heads.	II
The Old Coffee Tavern and shop, Smithy Bank; 52.97720°N 1.89314°W	—	Mid to late 18th century	A house that was extended to the left with the addition of a shop in the 19th century, it is in painted brick on a stone plinth, and has a moulded eaves band and a tile roof. There are three storeys, an attic and a cellar, and three bays. Steps with a wrought iron balustrade lead up to the central doorway that has a bracketed pediment. Above the doorway is a round-headed window with a bracketed sill, pilastered jambs, and a raised keystone, and over it is a blind keyed oval oculus with a moulded surround. The other windows have lintels grooved as voussoirs and triple keystones; some are sashes and some are casements. To the left, the shop is lower, and has three storeys and one bay. In the ground floor is a shop window and a doorway, and above are sash windows.	II
1 High Street; 52.97740°N 1.89316°W	—	1771	The house, which was altered later, is in red brick on a stone plinth, with quoins, and a tile roof with coped verges. There are two storeys and two bays. The doorway has a dated and inscribed lintel, the windows are casements with wedge lintels, and the window to the left of the door has a cornice hood.	II
The Talbot Inn, Station Road; 52.97948°N 1.89487°W		Late 18th century	The public house is in stone with floor bands, an eaves band, and a tile roof. There are three storeys, and an L-shaped plan, with a front of three bays, and a rear wing. In the centre is a gabled porch, this is flanked by bay windows, and in the upper floors are casement windows.	II
Town Head Farmhouse; 52.97935°N 1.88891°W		Late 18th century	A remodelling of a 17th-century house, the farmhouse is in stone with coved eaves, and a tile roof with coped verges. There are three storeys, a front of three bays, and two rear wings with an outshut between. A semicircular step leads up to the central doorway, that has reeded pilasters, a fanlight, and an open pediment. The windows are casements, some with mullions, and on the first floor at the front is a circular sundial dated 1787.	II
Crumpwood Weir; 52.97976°N 1.86253°W		1807–11	The weir was built to allow the Uttoxeter Canal to cross the River Churnet without an aqueduct. It is in stone and has rectangular abutments with moulded tops at the ends. The weir is about 30 metres (98 ft) long, and has a drop of about 0.5 metres (1 ft 8 in).	II
Thomas Lovatt Memorial; 52.97864°N 1.89158°W	—	1813	The memorial is in the churchyard of St Peter's Church. It is a chest tomb in stone, and has a rectangular plan, panelled sides, and an oversailing cap with a moulded edge.	II
The Lock Up; 52.97636°N 1.89392°W		1819	The village lock-up is in stone and has a circular plan and one storey. There is a door to the north, and on the top is a hemispherical dome and a cupola with a ball finial. The lock-up is also a scheduled monument.	II
28 and 29 Horse Road; 52.97622°N 1.89591°W	—	Early 19th century	The pair of houses in painted brick on a stone plinth, with dentilled eaves and a tile roof. There are two storeys and three bays. On the front is a gabled porch, and the windows are casements with pointed heads and Gothic glazing bars.	II
Alton Bridge; 52.98030°N 1.89452°W		Early 19th century	The bridge carries Farley Lane over the River Churnet. It is in stone and consists of a single segmental arch. The bridge has a moulded parapet string course and a balustraded parapet, and the rusticated abutments sweep round and end in massive pilasters with panelled and pyramidal caps.	II
Clarke and Sutton family memorial 52.97829°N 1.89200°W	—	Early 19th century	The memorial is in the churchyard of St Peter's Church. It is a chest tomb in stone, with a square plan, panelled sides, and caps with moulded edges.	II
Dimble Cottage; 52.97609°N 1.89404°W	—	Early 19th century	A pair of stone houses with coved eaves, and a tile roof with coped verges. There are two storeys and four bays, and the windows are casements.	II
House adjoining Dimble Cottage; 52.97601°N 1.89407°W	—	Early 19th century	A stone house with coved eaves, and a tile roof with coped verges. There are two storeys and two bays. In the centre is a gabled porch, and the windows are casements.	II
Lord's Bridge; 52.98629°N 1.90769°W		Early 19th century	The bridge carries a footpath over the River Churnet. It is in stone and consists of a segmental arch flanked by small semicircular arches. The arches have channeled voussoirs, hood moulds, parapet bands, and panelled and coped parapets ending in square piers.	II
Mileplate at N.G.R. SK 04254325; 52.98656°N 1.93839°W		Early 19th century	The mileplate is attached to a wall at the side of a drive. It is in cast iron and consists of a rectangular plate with a triangular head, inscribed "TO ALTON ABBEY 2½ MILES".	II
Mileplate at N.G.R. SK 04804334; 52.98727°N 1.92996°W		Early 19th century	The mileplate is attached to a wall at the side of a drive. It is in cast iron and consists of a rectangular plate with a triangular head, inscribed "TO ALTON ABBEY 2 MILES".	II
Rock Well; 52.97606°N 1.89647°W	—	Early 19th century	The opening to the well has an ogee head with a hood mould. The well shaft, which has a square plan, has been filled in.	II
The White House, New Road; 52.97728°N 1.89343°W	—	Early 19th century	The house is in lined stucco and has a hipped slate roof. There are two storeys and three bays. In the centre is a Tuscan porch, and the windows are mullioned and contain casements.	II
Elizabeth Smith Memorial; 52.97855°N 1.89161°W	—	1836	The memorial is in the churchyard of St Peter's Church. It is a chest tomb in stone, and has a rectangular plan, panelled sides, and an oversailing cap with a moulded edge.	II
Rock House and Rose Cottage, Smithy Bank; 52.97620°N 1.89356°W	—	c.1840	A pair of stone houses in Gothic style, with projecting eaves cornices, and slate roofs with coped verges. Each house has two storeys and two bays, a central doorway with a four-centred arched head, and chamfered mullioned windows with hood moulds. Rock House is to the left, Rose Cottage is recessed to the right, and is lower and narrower.	II
Threapwood Lodge; 52.98584°N 1.94380°W	—	c.1840	Originally a lodge to Alton Towers, it is in orange brick on a stone plinth, and has overhanging eaves, and a hipped slate roof. There is one storey and a central semi-octagonal projection flanked by doorways with four-centred arched heads. The windows have pointed heads and contain Gothic glazing bars.	II
Wall, gates and gate piers, St Peter's Church; 52.97796°N 1.89177°W	—	c.1840	The churchyard wall and the gate piers are in stone, and the gates are in cast iron. The wall encloses parts of the churchyard, it has shaped coping, and there are gate piers at the south and west angles. At the south angle there are three gate piers in Gothic style, two with embattled tops, and between them are gates. At the west angle are two piers with a square section, they have moulded caps, and also flank gates.	II
St John the Baptist's Church; 52.97951°N 1.89184°W	—	c.1840	A Roman Catholic church designed by A. W. N. Pugin in Perpendicular style, it is in stone with tile roofs and crested ridge tiles. The church consists of a nave, a chancel, an oratory, and a southeast chapel.	II*
Cross, St John the Baptist's Church; 52.97939°N 1.89206°W	—	c.1840	The cross in the churchyard is in stone, and has a square base. On it are three steps, a pedestal with quatrefoil panels containing the symbols of the Four Evangelists, a shaft with chamfered corners and a shield on each face, and an elaborate head with canopied panels and a foliated cross.	II
Wall and outbuilding, St John the Baptist's Church; 52.97967°N 1.89144°W	—	c.1840	The wall encloses the north and west sides of the churchyard. It is in coped stone and about 150 yards (140 m) long. Attached to the wall to the north of the chancel of the church is a small gabled outbuilding approached by a flight of steps. At the east end of the wall is a rectangular-shaped pier.	II
Stables and wall, The White House; 52.97705°N 1.89350°W	—	c.1840	The stables and wall are to the south and east of the house. The stable is in stone with a slate roof and has two bays. It contains pitching holes and a door, and there is a lean-to with garage doors. The wall encloses the rear yard and front garden of the house and it contains a gateway.	II
Hospital of St John; 52.97934°N 1.89127°W	—	1840–47	The building, which was designed by A. W. N. Pugin, is in stone with tile roofs and crested ridge tiles, and it forms three ranges around a courtyard. The eastern range contains a central two-storey gabled porch with diagonal buttresses. To the right the range has two storeys and attics, and seven bays, and to the left it has one storey and an attic and three bays. The north range has one storey and three bays, and ends in the three-storey tower of the warden's house. The south range has two storeys and attic and six bays, a lower two-storey bay, and a two-storey gabled tower that has a bellcote with a pyramidal roof. The windows are mullioned, and in the attics are hip roofed dormers.	II*
Old Police Station, High Street; 52.97805°N 1.89141°W	—	c. 1845	A house in red brick with stone dressings, and a tile roof with coped verges. There is one storey and an attic, an L-shaped plan, and a front of three bays, the right bay projecting and gabled. In the angle is a single-storey lean-to. The doorway has a chamfered surround and a cambered head, the windows are casements with chamfered surrounds, and there is a gabled dormer with two lights and a mullion.	II
Old School House, Castle Gate; 52.97825°N 1.89123°W	—	1845	A school, later a private house, it is in red brick with stone dressings, a floor band and a tile roof. There are two storeys and three bays, the middle bay projecting as a gabled two-storey porch with a datestone. The doorway has a Tudor arched head, and the small paned windows have chamfered mullions.	II
St John's School; 52.97964°N 1.89268°W	—	1847	A house designed by A. W. N. Pugin, it was later used as a school. It is in stone with embattled parapets, and has tile roofs with crested ridge tiles. The building consists of a house with an L-shaped plan, and a chapel at the east end, making a T-shaped plan. The main range of the house has three storeys and five bays, with a three-bay wing to the left, and at the corners are four-storey towers, one with a pyramidal roof. Most of the windows are mullioned. The chapel has a semi-octagonal east end.	II*
Village pump and trough 52.97526°N 1.89377°W	—	Late 19th century	The pump is in cast iron, and has a cylindrical shaft with an enlarged head, and a curved spout and handle. The trough is in stone.	II
