= Farley, Staffordshire =

Hamlet in Staffordshire, England

Coordinates: 52.975°N 1.900°W

Farley
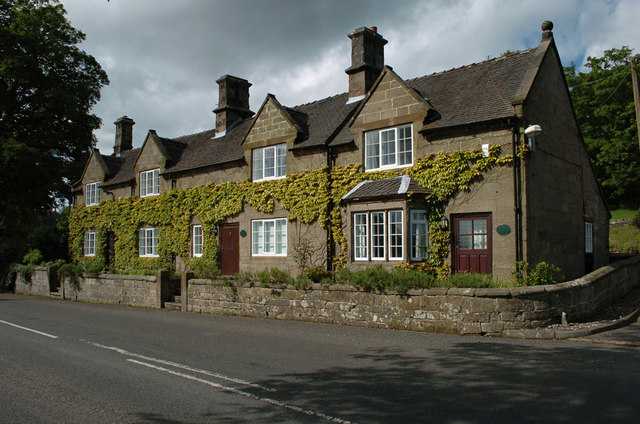
- Cottages at Farley

- Location within Staffordshire
- Population: 139 (2021 census)
- District: Staffordshire Moorlands
- Shire county: Staffordshire
- Region: West Midlands
- Country: England
- Sovereign state: United Kingdom
- Post town: Stoke-on-Trent
- Postcode district: ST10
- Dialling code: 01538
- Police: Staffordshire
- Fire: Staffordshire
- Ambulance: West Midlands
- UK Parliament: Staffordshire Moorlands

Farley is a hamlet and civil parish in the Staffordshire Moorlands district, in the county of Staffordshire, England. It is near to the villages of Alton and Oakamoor. In 2021 the parish had a population of 139.

Alton Towers; the UK's largest theme park, is within the parish boundary.

To the west of the hamlet stands the privately owned 17th century Farley Hall, which has been both a youth hostel and the residence of Anthony Bamford, Managing Director of JCB.

== See also ==
- Listed buildings in Farley, Staffordshire
