= Alton Castle =

Castle in Alton, Staffordshire, England

- Alton, Staffordshire
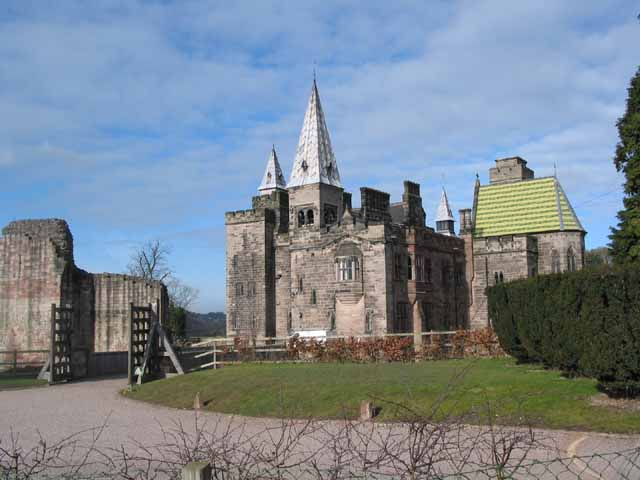

Site information
- Type: Masonry castle

Location
- Coordinates: 52.9798°N 1.8912°W
- Grid reference: grid reference SK074425

Site history
- Built: 12th century; present building: mid-19th-century.
- Built by: Bertram de Verdun; present castle built by John Talbot, 16th Earl of Shrewsbury

Alton Castle is a Gothic-revival castle, on a hill above the Churnet Valley, in the village of Alton, Staffordshire, England. The site has been fortified in wood since Saxon times, with a stone castle dating from the 12th century. The current castle was constructed in the mid-19th century by John Talbot, 16th Earl of Shrewsbury, of nearby Alton Towers. Since 1967 the castle has been designated a Grade I listed building. It is also a scheduled monument.

== History ==
Alton Castle was founded in stone by Bertram III de Verdun and built on a rocky precipice overlooking the River Churnet in the 12th century, however the site had been fortified in wood since Saxon times. The castle is also referred to in historical documents as Alton, Alverton or Aulton. The 12th-century castle had a gatehouse added in the early 14th century, and was later substantially reconstructed during the 15th century. It was subsequently damaged during the Civil War.

From 1442, the castle was in the possession of the Earls of Shrewsbury, who from the beginning of the 19th-century made their home at nearby Alton Towers. By the mid-19th-Century the castle was mostly in ruins. John Talbot, 16th Earl of Shrewsbury, commissioned Catholic architect Augustus Pugin, who was already working for the Earl at Alton Towers, to construct a new gothic castle/country house on the site. Most of the 12th-century ruins were demolished to make way for the new building which was designed to look like a medieval castle built by English crusaders of the Knights of the Teutonic Order in Germany. The Earl also commissioned Pugin to develop the surrounding area on castle hill. A "replica of a medieval hospital, a guildhall and presbytery" were constructed; dedicated to St John the Baptist, the buildings served as a church and hospital (almshouses) and were designed to provide and care for the poor for of the parish. The church was also used as a school for local poor children.

It is unclear why the 16th Earl had the castle rebuilt. It may have been intended for the Earl's cousin and eventual successor, Bertram Talbot (17th Earl of Shrewsbury); or it may have been intended as a Dower House for the Earl's wife, if he should predecease her. Towards the end of the castle's construction, the earl suggested the castle could be a home for priests, but Pugin was "vehemently against the idea".

The site was taken over by the Sisters of Mercy in 1855 and the presbytery became their convent. The castle remained a private residence until 1919 when the Sisters of Mercy bought it for £3,500 to extend their boarding school. The school closed in 1989 and the castle was left empty.

In 1995, it was purchased by the Archdiocese of Birmingham, and in September 1996 opened as a Catholic Youth Retreat Centre. Over 8,000 children visit the Castle each year, mainly with schools, but also from other children's organisations such as youth groups and charities who work with children with disabilities. Some of the children have suffered disadvantages, including disability, and many come from inner city areas of the West Midlands. The children participate in a variety of activities during their stay including mountain biking, trekking, archery, rock-climbing and learning outdoor navigation and survival skills.

== See also ==
- Alton Towers - Nearby Gothic-revival stately home; also formerly owned by the Earls of Shrewsbury.
- List of Grade I listed buildings in Staffordshire
- Listed buildings in Alton, Staffordshire
