= Listed buildings in Oakamoor =

Oakamoor is a civil parish in the district of Staffordshire Moorlands, Staffordshire, England. It contains 16 listed buildings that are recorded in the National Heritage List for England. All the listed buildings are designated at Grade II, the lowest of the three grades, which is applied to "buildings of national importance and special interest". The parish includes the village of Oakamoor and the surrounding area. The listed buildings include a country house with its stables and lodges, smaller houses and cottages, two churches, the retaining wall of lime kilns, a former railway crossing keeper's cottage, a bridge, a school, and a war memorial.

== Buildings ==
| Name and location | Photograph | Date | Notes |
|---|---|---|---|
| Bridge south of the war memorial 53.00108°N 1.92121°W | | 16th century | The bridge, which carries the B5417 road over the River Churnet, was rebuilt in the 18th century, and widened in the 19th century. It is in red and white sandstone, and consists of four segmental arches, the outer arches being wider. |
| Keeper's Cottage and stable 52.99695°N 1.91096°W | — | 18th century | The house and stable are in stone with quoins, and have tile roofs with coped verges. The house to the right has two storeys and three bays, and the windows have two lights and chamfered mullions. The stable is lower and has a casement window and a door. |
| Outsclough and stable 53.00810°N 1.91223°W | — | 18th century | The house is in stone with quoins and a tile roof. There are two storeys and three bays, and most of the windows are casements with chamfered mullions. To the right is a single-storey stable. |
| Round House Farmhouse and cowhouse 52.98747°N 1.92732°W | — | 18th century | The farmhouse was remodelled in the 19th century. It is in stone and has a tile roof that has a coped verge to the northwest and it is hipped to the southeast. There are two storeys and three bays, and the southeast end is apsidal. The central door has a fanlight, and the windows are sashes. To the northwest is a single-storey cowhouse containing sash windows, a doorway with a chamfered lintel, a cowhouse door, and a loft door. |
| Retaining wall to lime kilns 53.00117°N 1.91961°W | | c. 1806 | The retaining wall to the lime kilns is in sandstone, and about 20 metres (66 ft) long and 7 metres (23 ft) high. There are three buttressed sections, and the wall contains two semicircular-headed stoke holes. |
| Sunnyside; 53.00083°N 1.92266°W | — | Early 19th century | A red brick house with quoins and a moulded eaves band, and a tile roof with coped verges on kneelers. There are three storeys, and a T-shaped plan consisting of a three-bay main range and a rear wing. The central doorway has a bracketed hood, and the windows are casements with wedge lintels and raised keystones. |
| Holy Trinity Church; 53.00042°N 1.92361°W | | 1832 | The church is in stone with a slate roof. It consists of a nave and a chancel in one unit, a northwest vestry, and a west tower. The church is built on a sloping site, and the basement acts as the church hall. The tower has three stages, diagonal buttresses, a south door with a Tudor arch, panelled spandrels, and a hood mould, and an embattled parapet with panelled corner pinnacles. The windows on the sides of the church have three lights and are in Perpendicular style, the east window has a Tudor arch and five lights, and the basement has mullioned windows and a four-light west window. |
| Cotton Primary School; 53.00971°N 1.90524°W | — | c. 1840 | A school and school house: the house is in stone with coved eaves, and a tile roof with coped gables. There are two storeys and three bays. In the centre is a doorway with a pointed segmental head, to the sides are flat-headed windows, to the left is a blocked doorway, above is a stair window with a mullion, and there are two gabled dormers. On the roof is a bellcote with a cross. To the left is the school which is in red brick with stone dressings on a plinth, with moulded eaves and a tile roof. There is a single storey and five bays divided by buttresses. The windows consist of a double sash window, the other windows are two-light casements with mullions, and there is a box dormer. |
| Gate House; 52.99882°N 1.92336°W | | Mid 19th century | Originally a railway crossing keeper's cottage for the Churnet Valley line, later a private house. The lower floor is in stone, the upper floor is timber framed and the roof is tiled. There are two storeys, the upper storey is jettied, and gabled with fretted bargeboards. In the centre is a gabled porch with a four-centred arch, in the upper floor is a bay window with a hipped roof, and the windows on the east side are casements. |
| Lightoaks and greenhouse 52.99744°N 1.93188°W | — | Mid 19th century | A large house in roughcast brick, with a slate roof, an irregular plan, two storeys, attics and cellars. The north front has three bays, each gabled with shaped bargeboards, it contains casement windows, and there is a porte-cochère. The garden front also has three gabled bays with shaped bargeboards, the outer bays containing bay windows with hipped roofs. From the northeast corner a covered arcade leads to a greenhouse. |
| Moor Court; 52.99816°N 1.91306°W | — | 1861 | A country house in Jacobean style, it is built in stone with tiled roofs and shaped gables. The south front has three storeys and an attic, and four bays, and a single-bay with two storeys and an attic to the left. The west front has two storeys and an attic, and six bays. The windows are casements, and on the east front is a two-storey porch with a dated parapet, and a pointed niche containing a statue of Saint George. |
| West Lodge; 52.99676°N 1.91432°W | — | c. 1861 | The former lodge to Moor Court is in stone with a tile roof, two storeys, and two bays. In the centre is a gabled porch with a four-centred arch and a hood mould. To is its left is a bay window, and the other windows have chamfered mullions. |
| Bolton Memorial Church; 53.00326°N 1.92113°W | | 1876 | The church, which is in Gothic style, is in stone, and has a tile roof with crested ridge tiles and coped verges. It consists of a nave with a west porch and a gabled bellcote, a chancel, a north vestry, and a southeast chapel and porch. |
| East Lodge; 52.99672°N 1.90921°W | — | c. 1913 | The former lodge Moor Court is in stone with a storey band, and has a tile roof with coped verges. There is one storey and an attic, and a T-shaped plan, with a front of three bays. On the front is a gabled porch flanked by a small wooden verandah on each side. The windows have chamfered mullions. |
| Former stables, Moor Court; 52.99822°N 1.91217°W | — | 1913 | The former stables are in stone, and have a tile roof with coped verges on kneelers. There is one storey and an attic, and seven bays. The central bay is gabled, there is a cupola on the roof, and dormers to the left and right. Two of the other windows are circular, and the rest have chamfered mullions. |
| War memorial 53.00184°N 1.92033°W | | c. 1919 | The war memorial stands in an enclosure, and is in stone. It consists of a plain pedestal on two steps, on which is a rectangular tapering shaft and a cross within a circle. On the south side is a carved sword. The pedestal has panels carved with inscriptions and the names of those lost in the two world Wars. |
