= John Talbot, 16th Earl of Shrewsbury =

British noble (1791–1852)

The Right Honourable The Earl of Shrewsbury
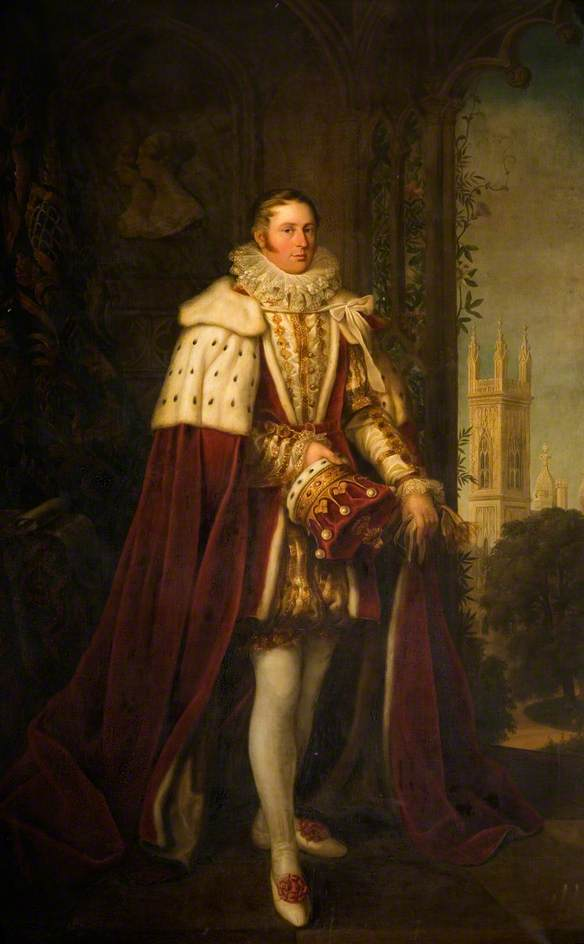
- Portrait of John Talbot, 16th Earl of Shrewsbury and Waterford
- Tenure: (1827–1852)
- Predecessor: Charles Talbot, 15th Earl of Shrewsbury (uncle)
- Successor: Bertram Arthur Talbot, 17th Earl of Shrewsbury (cousin)
- Other titles: 16th Earl of Waterford
- Born: 18 March 1791
- Died: 9 November 1852 (aged 61)
- Buried: St John the Baptist Catholic Church, Alton, Staffordshire; 52.979030°N 1.892527°W
- Residence: Heythrop Park; later Alton Towers
- Offices: Lord High Steward of Ireland
- Spouse: Maria Theresa Talbot
- Issue: The Hon. John Talbot; died in infancy.; Lady Mary Alathea Beatrix Talbot; married Prince Filippo Andrea Doria Pamphilj, 13th Prince of Melfi.; Lady Gwendoline Catherine Talbot; married Prince Marcantonio Borghese, 8th Prince of Sulmona.
- Parents: John Joseph Talbot; Catherine Clifton

John Talbot, 16th Earl of Shrewsbury, 16th Earl of Waterford (18 March 1791 – 9 November 1852) was a British peer and aristocrat. Sometimes known as "Good Earl John", he has been described as "the most prominent British Catholic of his day", although he was the last Earl of Shrewsbury to follow the Catholic faith. John was also Lord High Steward of Ireland, an office the Earls of Shrewsbury have held since 1446.

== Biography ==
John was born on 18 March 1791; son of John Joseph Talbot and Catherine Talbot (Nee Clifton). He inherited his titles in 1827 from his paternal uncle, Charles Talbot, 15th Earl of Shrewsbury.

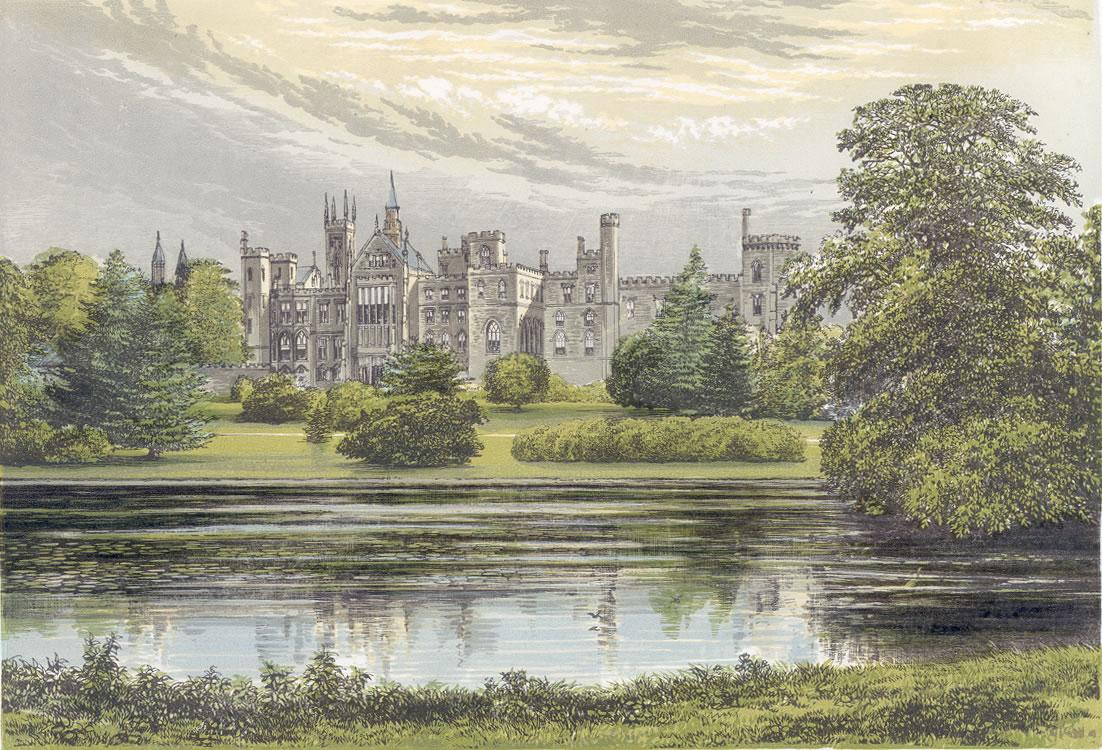
Alton Towers from across the ornamental lake

Among the estates he inherited from his uncle was the Talbot family's main home, Heythrop Park, which burned down in 1831. After the fire, John moved the family to another of his inherited estates, in Staffordshire. The house had originally been known as Alverton Lodge, and had been enlarged by the 15th Earl, who enclosed the park and started creating the formal valley gardens to create "Alton Abbey" (the name "Abbey" was chosen because it was fashionable -the site had no religious connections). John continued his uncle's work at Alton, developing and expanding the house and estate further; he renamed it Alton Towers. John was a "patron of the Gothic revival" and commissioned noted Gothic revival architect Augustus Pugin to work at the Towers.

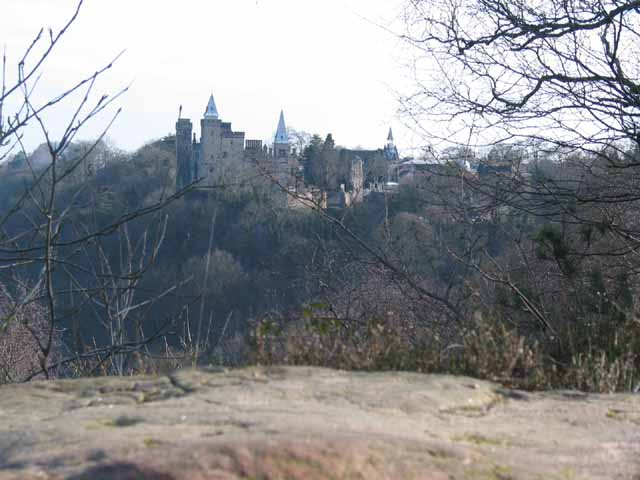
Alton Castle from across the Churnet Valley

In addition to the building work at Alton Towers, John set about rebuilding nearby Alton Castle. The castle occupies a rocky precipice above the River Churnet on the outskirts of the village of Alton, Staffordshire. On a site fortified since Saxon times, the 12th-century castle had fallen into ruins by the 19th century. John had most of the ruins demolished, engaging Pugin again to design a new gothic-revival castle, which was built to resemble a French or German medieval castle. It is unclear why the 16th Earl had the castle rebuilt. It may have been intended for his cousin and eventual successor, Bertram Talbot (17th Earl of Shrewsbury); or it may have been intended as a Dower House for the Earl's wife, if he should predecease her. Towards the end of the castle's construction, the earl suggested the castle could be a home for priests, but Pugin was "vehemently against the idea".

John is remembered as "Good Earl John" for his charity, having supported local schools and churches, and financed the construction of new Catholic chapels around the Midlands. Among the buildings he helped finance is St Chad's Cathedral in Birmingham. Adjacent to Alton Castle, John had a new church constructed alongside a "replica of a medieval hospital, a guildhall and presbytery"; this was again to the designs of Augustus Pugin. The Earl's friend, Ambrose Lisle March Phillipps De Lisle, convinced him to construct a monastery: this idea developed into the hospital complex that was built, as John felt it "could do more good for the community" than a monastery. The "hospital" served as a "humanitarian almshouse", providing for the poor and elderly of the parish. The buildings also provided lodgings for poor and elderly priests, with an attached library and dining room. The church, dedicated to St. John the Baptist, was also used as a school for local poor children.

John died on 9 November 1852, aged 61. His funeral was held in the Chapel of St Peter, Alton Towers, on 14 December 1852. John and his wife are buried in St. John the Baptist Roman Catholic Church, the church John built adjacent to Alton Castle.

== Family ==
John married Maria Theresa Talbot, daughter of William Talbot of Castle Talbot, County Wexford, Ireland. They had three children:

- John Talbot (27 November 1816 – 20 March 1817), their only son, died in infancy in Paris.
- Lady Mary Alathea Beatrix Talbot; married Prince Filippo Andrea Doria-Pamphili-Landi, 13th Prince of Melfi in Rome in 1838. Mary and Prince Filippo had met at Queen Victoria's Coronation. Victoria suggested her as one of the eight coronal train-bearers as a gesture towards her father being "the oldest earl in the kingdom and a Roman Catholic" (the Roman Catholic Relief Act 1829 had been passed less than a decade earlier). Mary was created "Prinzessin von Bayern" (a Princess of Bavaria) by King Ludwig I of Bavaria.
- Lady Gwendoline Catherine Talbot; born 3 December 1817 in Cheltenham, Gloucestershire. Lady Gwendoline was described by King William IV as the "greatest beauty in the realm". She also married an Italian Prince: Prince Marcantonio Borghese, 8th Prince of Sulmona. The pair married on 11 May 1835 in Rome. Gwendoline died of scarlet fever in Rome, 27 October 1840, aged only 22. Gwendoline and Marcantonio had four children. Their three sons all died of measles shortly after Gwendoline's death. Their daughter, Agnese, married Prince Rodolfo Boncompagni Ludovisi (Head of a former Sovereign House) to become Princess of Piombino and Duchess of Sora.

Honorary titles
Preceded by Charles Talbot	Lord High Steward of Ireland; 1827–1852	Succeeded by Bertram Arthur Talbot
Peerage of England
Preceded by Charles Talbot	Earl of Shrewsbury; 1827–1852	Succeeded by Bertram Arthur Talbot
Peerage of Ireland
Preceded by Charles Talbot	Earl of Waterford; 1827–1852	Succeeded by Bertram Arthur Talbot
