= Chained Oak =

Tree in Staffordshire, England

Coordinates: 52°59′12″N 1°54′06″W

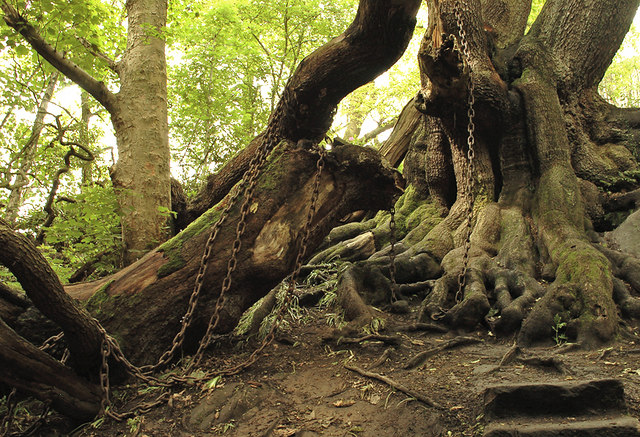
The Chained Oak

The Chained Oak is a roughly 700 year old English oak tree, tied in chains, near to the village of Alton, Staffordshire, England. The tree, referred to as "The Old Oak", is the subject of a local legend involving the Earl of Shrewsbury and an old beggar woman. It is located on a public footpath to the left of the Chained Oak B&B.

The legend was the basis for Hex – the Legend of the Towers at the nearby Alton Towers theme park.

In 2020, the Chained Oak was nominated for the Woodland Trust's Tree of the Year.

== Legend ==
On an autumn night, the Earl of Shrewsbury was returning to his home at Alton Towers when an old woman suddenly appeared in the road ahead of his horse and coach. The coach stopped to find why she was there at which point the old woman begged for a coin. The Earl cruelly dismissed her, so the old woman stated that she would place a curse on him. The old woman told the Earl that for every branch on the Old Oak Tree that fell, a member of the Earl’s family would die. The Earl refused to listen and continued on his way.

That same night, a violent storm caused a single branch from the old oak tree to break and fall. Later that evening, a member of the Earl’s family suddenly and mysteriously died.

Now firmly believing in the power of the curse, the Earl is said to have ordered his servants to chain every remaining branch together to prevent them from falling. To this day, the Oak tree remains chained up.

An independent horror film based on the legend was released in 2014.

=== Variations ===
There are slight variations in the story, however the core remains the same.

- One version states it was an old man who cursed the earl, not a woman.
- A second version is that instead of a storm bringing down a branch, the Earl's son was out riding the next day and, as he passed the old oak tree the woman had been standing under, a branch fell on top of him, knocking him from his horse and killing him.
- The third version of the story, which was invented for the theme park attraction Hex – the Legend of the Towers at Alton Towers theme park states the Earl brought the fallen branch back to his home, where he performed experiments in his vault in an attempt to break the curse.

== Falling branches ==
On 9 April 2007, one of the tree's main branches fell off. The Talbot family confirmed that no one died when the branch fell. Since then, a considerable proportion of the chained oak has collapsed.

== Date and identity ==
Various dates are attributed to the legend of the chained oak, affecting the identity of "The Earl".

BBC Stoke and Staffordshire date the legend as from 1821, which would identify the earl as Charles Talbot, 15th Earl of Shrewsbury.

Alton Towers Heritage state the chaining occurred "around the 1840s", which would identify the earl as John Talbot, 16th Earl of Shrewsbury.

The 16th Earl is remembered as "Good Earl John" for his charity, having supported local schools and churches, and financed the construction of new Catholic chapels around the Midlands, including in the village of Alton where he also built almshouses for the poor and elderly. His reputation does not seem to fit that of the Earl in the legend.

=== Deaths ===
The legend states a member of the Earl's family (sometimes quoted as his son) suddenly died.

The 16th Earl's only son died in infancy and not around the date cited for the legend.

The 16th Earl had two daughters; the youngest, Lady Gwendoline Catherine Talbot, died in 1840 aged only 22. This is close to the legend's alleged date range, but her death was not mysterious: she died of Scarlet fever in Rome. Three of Gwendoline's children died of measles shortly after their mother, meaning the Earl had four deaths in his close family, not the single one described in the legend.

== Rational explanations ==
The 15th and 16th Earls of Shrewsbury built and then extended Alton Towers and its gardens. During their tenure, thousands of new trees were planted, but the old trees were "greatly prized". The Chained Oak was situated in a highly visible position, "just off a carriage-way" frequently used by the Earls. As such, the tree may have been wrapped in chains simply to preserve it, and prevent it from collapsing under its own weight.
