= Denstone railway station =

Former railway station in Staffordshire, England

Denstone
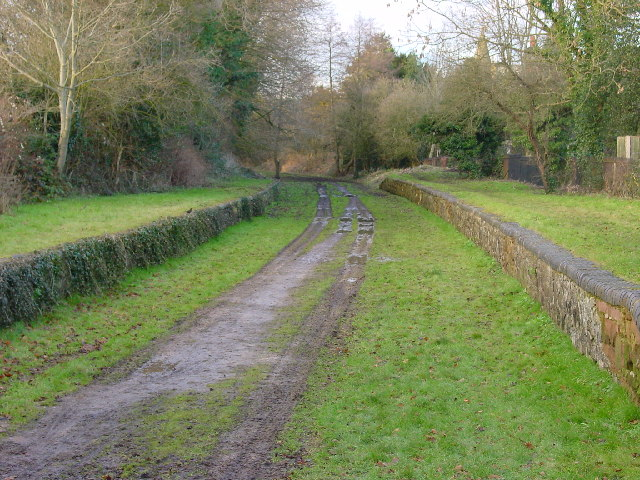

General information
- Location: Denstone, Staffordshire Moorlands, England
- Coordinates: 52.9642°N 1.8516°W
- Grid reference: SK100407
- Platforms: 2

Other information
- Status: Disused

History
- Original company: North Staffordshire Railway
- Post-grouping: London, Midland and Scottish Railway; British Railways

Key dates
- 1 August 1873: Opened as Denstone Crossing
- 2 April 1923: Renamed Denstone
- 4 January 1965: Closed
Location

Denstone railway station served the village of Denstone, in Staffordshire, England. It was a stop on the North Staffordshire Railway's Churnet Valley Line.

== History ==
The Churnet Valley line was authorised in 1846, and opened to traffic between Macclesfield and Uttoxeter in 1849. Denstone did not originally have a station but, in 1873, a station was opened at the site of the College Road level crossing; it was consequently named Denstone Crossing. In 1923, one of the last acts of the North Staffordshire Railway, before it became part of the London, Midland and Scottish Railway, was to rename the station simply Denstone.

The station was closed on 4 January 1965.

Preceding station	Disused railways	Following station
Alton Towers	North Staffordshire Railway; Churnet Valley Line	Rocester

== The site today ==
The platforms remain in situ, as part of a footpath to Oakamoor via Alton Towers, but a house has been built across the route of the line, adjoining the former level crossing.
