= Bradley in the Moors =

Village in Staffordshire, England

Coordinates: 52.9690°N 01.9128°W

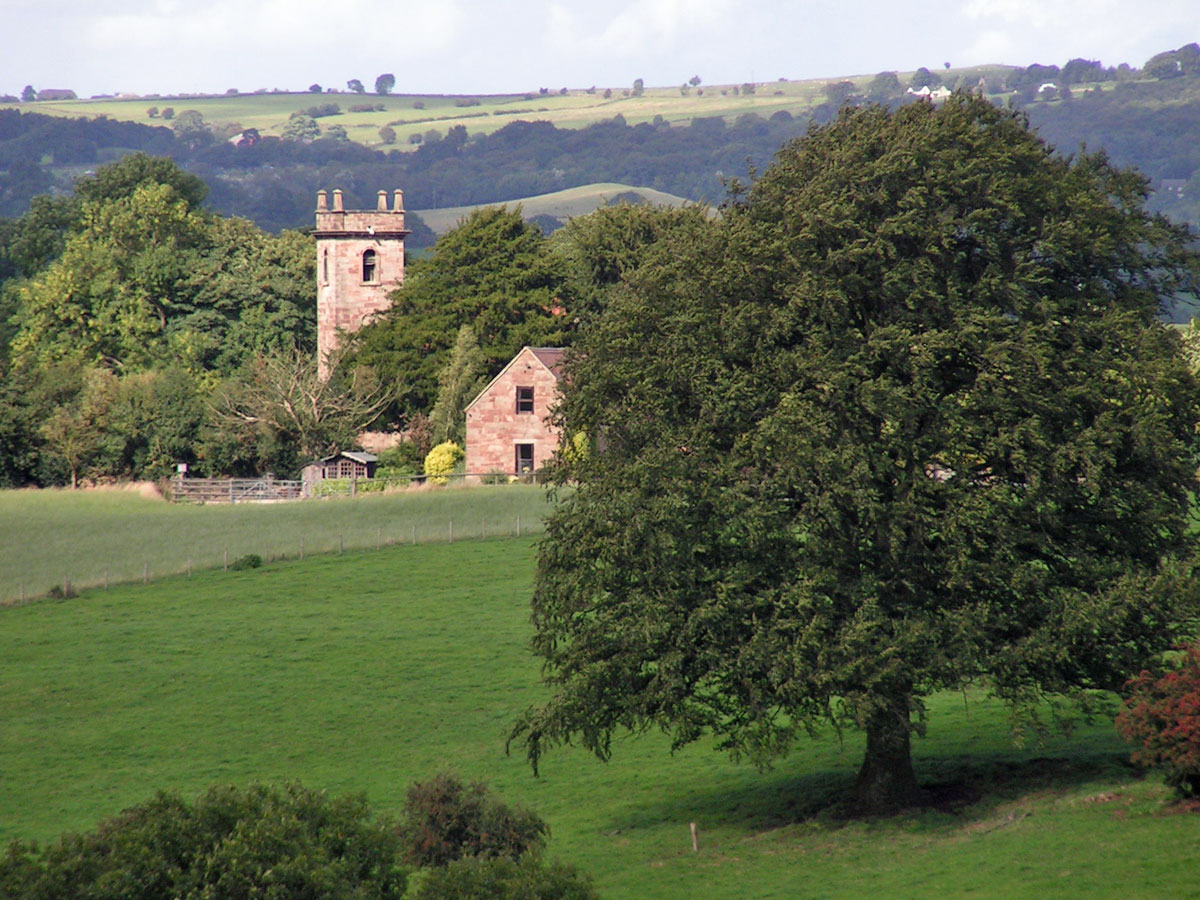

- Location within Staffordshire
- OS grid reference: SK05954130
- Civil parish: Alton
- District: Staffordshire Moorlands
- Shire county: Staffordshire
- Region: West Midlands
- Country: England
- Sovereign state: United Kingdom
- Post town: Stoke-on-Trent
- Postcode district: ST10
- Police: Staffordshire
- Fire: Staffordshire
- Ambulance: West Midlands

Bradley in the Moors is a village and former civil parish, now in the parish of Alton, in the Staffordshire Moorlands district, in the county of Staffordshire, England. It is situated between the villages of Gallows Green and Great Gate and consists of no more than eight cottages as well as two farms and a small B&B cottage. In 1931 the parish had a population of 77. On 1 April 1934 the parish was abolished and merged with Alton, part also went to Croxden.

Musician Pete McArdle was born on a farm in Bradley in the Moors, before moving to Birkenhead.

== See also ==
- Listed buildings in Alton, Staffordshire
