= Hex – The Legend of the Towers =

Mad renne rapp ride

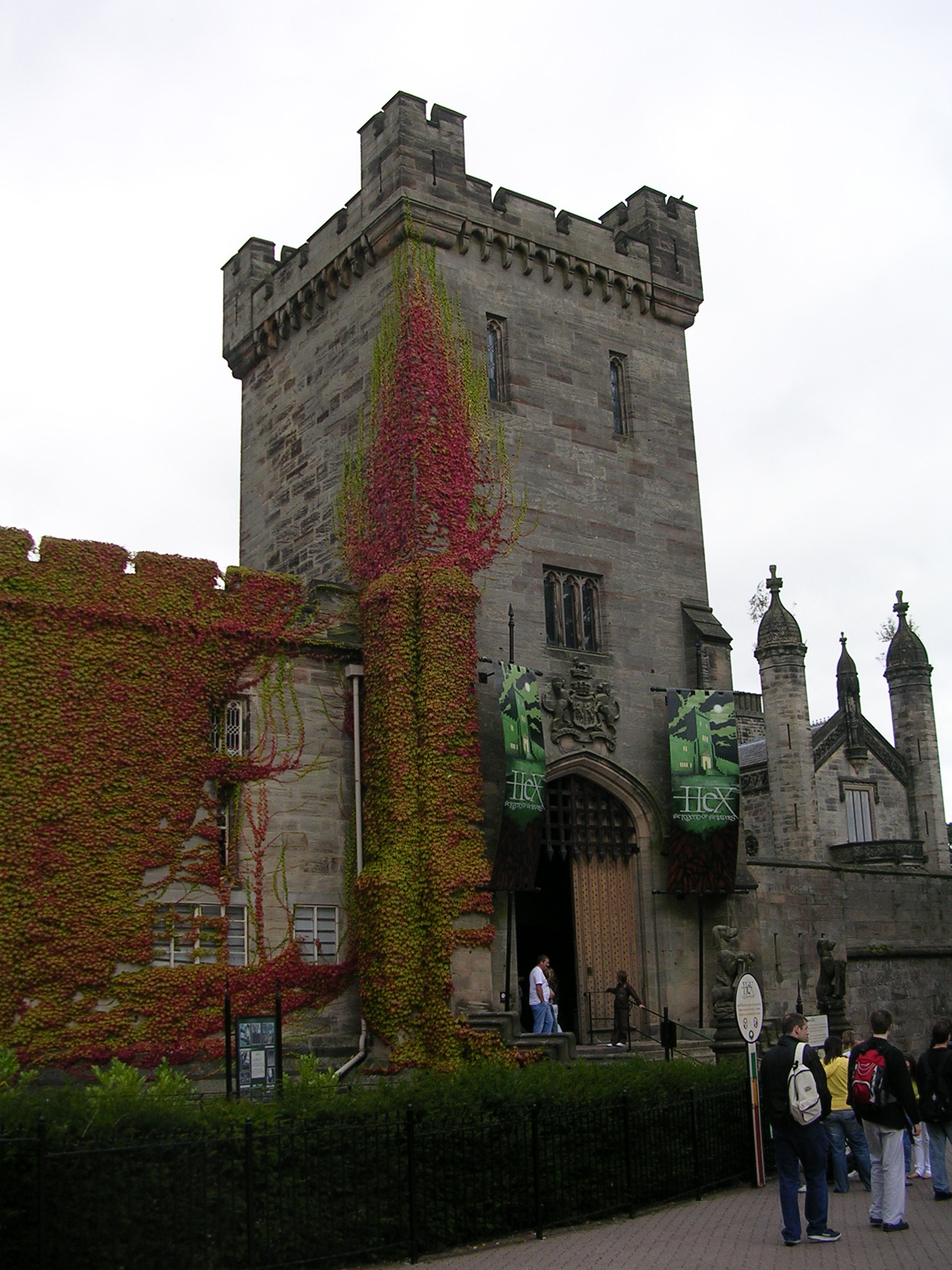

Alton Towers
- Coordinates: 52.985478°N 1.892736°W
- Status: Operating
- Cost: £4,000,000
- Opening date: 2000

Ride statistics
- Manufacturer: Vekoma
- Model: Madhouse
- Riders per vehicle: 78
- Rows: 4
- Duration: 5:25
- Height restriction: 90 cm (2 ft 11 in)
- Fastrack available

Hex – The Legend of the Towers is a Vekoma Madhouse attraction at Alton Towers. The experience combines a narrated walkthrough featuring immersive storytelling with a final ride sequence, blending theatrical elements with the experience of the Madhouse ride system. The ride is based on an interpretation of the local legend of the Chained Oak Tree and is set within restored areas of the Alton Towers house itself. It is narrated by the actor Jim Carter.

== Description ==
Hex tells the story of the Chained Oak Tree, a legend based around the towers themselves. The story has been a local legend for hundreds of years.

The legend says that the 15th Earl of Shrewsbury was cursed by an old beggarwoman to suffer a death in the family every time a branch fell from the old oak tree. Hex's version embellishes the end of the 'original' tale with the Earl experimenting on one of the fallen branches in a vault deep within the Towers themselves, and it is this vault, with its entrance bricked up behind a bookcase, that has supposedly been sealed up for two centuries and only recently discovered during renovation work. This is explained in several scenes during the experience.

This attraction was closed for the duration of the 2016 season, but reopened in 2017 with some minor updates. The ride spent most of the 2022 season closed, due to severe technical issues. The same happened in the 2023 season, with the ride shutting a few weeks after opening day. The parks divisional director Bianca Sammut confirmed on 1 August 2023 that Hex would remain closed throughout the 2023 season and later announced its reopening later in 2024, after engineering works and updates to the show.

=== Armoury and cinema ===
The attraction starts in the real armoury of the Towers, decorated with scaffolding and artefacts, which starts to tell the story of the renovation and the discovery of the vault, through video screens found along the twisting atmospheric queue. Statues draped in dust sheets decorate plinths high up near the darkened ceiling and sound-effects of chiselling can be heard to give the suggestion that this renovation is currently ongoing and unfinished. At the end of the queue is a large painting of the Earl hung on the wall, and visitors hear a short narrative which gives a brief introduction to the legend before they are shown onwards into the cinema area (still part of the real building) where visitors watch a short film which dramatises the legend and makes it clear that they will soon be visiting the recently discovered vault where the original branch is located.

=== Octagon ===
From the cinema area, guests are let through into the Octagon (still part of the real building) - a large dimly lit eight-sided hall containing more scaffolding and dust-sheets, draped curtains and a whirring generator high on a wall - and are led to believe that the story will be told further through more video screens. However, the generator suddenly 'blows', causing the lights and the video screens to fail and the room is plunged into semi-darkness. A wind picks up, causing the drapes to billow, and the ghostly cursing of the beggarwoman can be heard, along with the loud crash of a falling branch and the sound of horse's hooves. An apparition can be briefly seen in an alcove. To add to the suspense, the noise of the crashing branch is synchronised with a light water spray falling from the ceiling onto the guests below. The generator restarts and the words “a vault sealed for two centuries“ can be heard. The lighting comes back on and a curtain rises to allow guests to move up a small staircase, past the bookcase and into the next section of the attraction.

=== Vault ===
At this point, the guests are moving from the original building up into the specially constructed part of the ride, but due to the careful continuation of theming, it is difficult to tell where this occurs. They turn to the left past the bookcase and along a short, low-ceilinged 'stone' corridor - once again similarly decorated to the rest of the attraction - where they wait at two doors for entry into the vault. The scaffolding running along the corridor discourages the guests from getting close enough to touch the walls, as although the previous show areas in the building are real original stone, the walls of this 'stone' section are fibreglass cladding, which sounds hollow when tapped. The vault itself is a large hall-like structure, with the decorative ceiling supported by stone pillars, and shelves containing dusty artefacts lit with flickering candles. It contains the branch itself, chained to a long ledge that runs along the middle of the room, two rows of lap-bar benches that face the branch and a large machine, covered in lights and dials, which the Earl supposedly used in his experiments, which is located up against the far wall and wired to one end of the branch.

The lap-bars are lowered and checked by two staff members, who then leave the vault. The machine starts whirring, the lights flash, smoke starts to pour from the branch, atmospheric music begins and the ride starts. Riders gradually experience an odd sense of movement, even though nothing in the vault appears to be moving - with riders on one side feeling as if they're being pulled away from the branch and on the other feeling as if they're being pushed towards the branch. The benches then begin, almost imperceptibly at first, to swing back and forth relative to the room. The benches feel to be swinging higher and higher in each direction until finally they seem to perform a series of full rotations, with what was the floor rotating fully above the rider’s heads; the riders feel as if they are being repeatedly turned upside down. As the music and the sensation reaches a crescendo, a mass of roots become visible on the 'floor' above the disoriented riders' heads. The branch is lit as if to suggest an evil face with illuminated red eyes and the branch twinkles with fibre-optics before gradually the benches and vault return to their starting positions and the ride is over.

==== Ride system ====
The sensory illusion in a Vekoma Madhouse exploits a variety of mechanical and perceptual tricks. The longitudinal benches are mounted on a platform that can swing back and forth within the vault. The pivot mechanism for the benches is concealed by the Earl’s machine at one end of the room and a large cabinet at the other.

The benches are angled backward by 20 degrees, so riders face slightly upward while at rest. During the ride, the platform swings 15 degrees forward and backward. At full forward tilt, the benches are effectively at 5 degrees forward from horizontal, minimizing the risk of sliding into the lap restraints. At full backward tilt, the benches reach 45 degrees from horizontal, amplifying the sensory effect.

The vault itself is a large, six-sided drum capable of rotating through a full 360 degrees, with all scenery mounted on its inner surface. At the beginning of the ride, both the benches and the vault move slowly in unison, creating the impression of being pushed toward and pulled away from the branch. As the ride progresses, the bench platform continues its 15-degree oscillation while the vault rotation gradually falls out of sync, accelerating to create the sensation of rising height. Eventually, the vault completes a full rotation, giving riders the perception of inversion.

This effect relies on the brain’s tendency to over-interpret visual cues when vestibular input is relatively minor, a principle also employed in full-motion simulators to simulate acceleration and deceleration. Lighting effects are subtly varied throughout the experience to enhance disorientation and contribute to the overall illusion.
