= Listed buildings in Farley, Staffordshire =

Farley is a civil parish in the district of Staffordshire Moorlands, Staffordshire, England. It contains 54 listed buildings that are recorded in the National Heritage List for England. Of these, five are at Grade II*, the middle of the three grades, and the others are at Grade II, the lowest grade. The most impressive building in the parish is the country house of Alton Towers. This, together with its surrounding gardens, were developed for the Earls of Shrewsbury in the early 19th century. The house and associated structures, and many items in the gardens are listed. Outside the grounds of the house, the parish contains the village of Farley and the surrounding countryside. The listed buildings here are mainly houses, cottages, and associated structures, farmhouses and farm buildings. The other listed buildings include structures in the former Alton Towers railway station, and two mileposts.

== Key ==
| Grade | Criteria |
|---|---|
| II* | Particularly important buildings of more than special interest |
| II | Buildings of national importance and special interest |

== Buildings ==
| Name and location | Photograph | Date | Notes | Grade |
|---|---|---|---|---|
| Farley Hall, wall, greenhouse and billiard room 52.99502°N 1.89894°W | | 17th century | A large house that was remodelled in the 18th and 19th centuries, it is timber framed on a stone plinth, plastered with some applied timber framing, and the roof is tiled. The main part of the house has two storeys and an attic, a front of three gabled bays, and a two-storey single-bay extension to the right. In the centre is a door with a lean-to porch, the outer bays contain two-storey canted bay windows, and the other windows are tripartite sashes. Attached to the right of the house is a stone wall about 30 yards (27 m) long. Half way along it is a semicircular greenhouse on a stone plinth, with a domed top; the two steps leading up to it are flanked by ball finials on short pedestals. At the end of the wall is a billiard room in stone with a tile roof. It has one storey and three bays, the middle bay projecting, canted, and gabled. The windows have square heads and contain Gothic tracery. | II |
| Home Farmhouse; 52.99533°N 1.90009°W | — | 17th century | The farmhouse is in stone with a moulded eaves band, and a tile roof with coped verges and a ball finial. There are three storeys and three bays. On the front are two doorways, the left bay contains a window in the ground floor with chamfered mullions, and the other windows are 20th-century casements. | II |
| Parkhouse Farmhouse; 52.99250°N 1.90048°W | — | 17th century | The farmhouse is in stone with a storey band, a moulded eaves band, and a tile roof with coped verges and shaped kneelers. There are two storeys and an attic, three bays, and a single-bay extension to the right. The doorway has a moulded surround and a raised keystone. Most of the windows have chamfered mullions, and in the ground floor they have hood moulds. | II |
| Ribden Farmhouse; 53.01897°N 1.88758°W | — | 1748 | A stone farmhouse with quoins and a tile roof. There are three storeys, and a T-shaped plan, consisting of a two-bay main range and a rear wing. The central doorway has a cambered lintel, most of the windows are 20th-century top-hung casements, there is a blocked mullioned window in the top floor, and above the doorway and ground floor windows is a continuous hood mould. Inside, there is a former inglenook fireplace and a chamfered bressumer. | II |
| Cliffe Cottage and two attached cottages 52.99562°N 1.90064°W | | 18th century | A row of three stone cottages that have a tile roof with coped verges and a ball finial to the right. There is one storey and an attic, and four bays. To the right is a canted bay window with mullions, and the other windows are 20th-century casements. | II |
| Former agricultural buildings west of Home Farmhouse; 52.99570°N 1.90131°W | — | 18th century | The buildings, later used as stables, are in stone, and have a tile roof with coped verges and ball finials. They form two ranges at right angles, joined by a wall at the northwest end. | II |
| Pair of cottages southwest of The Old School; 52.99607°N 1.90005°W | — | 18th century | The cottages are in stone with a tile roof, and have one storey and an attic, the left cottage also has a basement, and a front of three bays. There are two doorways and a basement door, the windows have chamfered mullions and contain iron-framed casements, and there are three gabled dormers. | II |
| Cottage north of The Smithy; 52.99568°N 1.90019°W | — | Late 18th century | A stone cottage that has a tile roof with coped verges, one storey and an attic, and two bays. The windows are casements, and to the left is a gabled dormer. | II |
| Former stable block northwest of Farley Hall; 52.99499°N 1.89933°W | — | 1780 | The former stable block is in painted stuccoed brick and has dentilled eaves and a tile roof with coped verges. There are two storeys and an L-shaped plan consisting of a three-bay main range and a rear wing. The middle bay projects forward under a pediment, there are circular lights in the upper storey, and on the roof is an octagonal cupola with a dome and a wrought iron weathervane. | II |
| The Smithy; 52.99559°N 1.90030°W | — | 1780 | The smithy is in stone with a hollow chamfered eaves band, and a tile roof with coped verges and a ball finial to the left. There is one storey and an attic, and four bays. To the left is a smithy door with a cambered lintel. The third bay projects, it is gabled, and contains a doorway with an ogee moulded surround. Above the doorway is a datestone and a two-light window with a chamfered mullion, and flanking it are single-light windows with chamfered surrounds. | II |
| Cottage south of The Smithy; 52.99552°N 1.90037°W | — | 1780 | The cottage, which was remodelled in 1849, is in stone with a tile roof. There is one storey and an attic, and two bays. To the left is a doorway with an ogee moulded surround and a cambered head, to the right is a three-light chamfered and mullioned window, and above is a gabled dormer. | II |
| Cottage northwest of Home Farmhouse; 52.99547°N 1.90039°W | | 1786 | The cottage, which was remodelled in 1849, is in stone, and has a tile roof with coped verges and ball finials. There is one storey and an attic, the attic being corbelled, and three bays. The middle bay is gabled, and contains a doorway with a moulded surround and a cambered head. The right bay contains a bay window, there is a single-light window in the attic of the middle bay, the outer bays have gabled dormers, and the other windows have chamfered mullions. | II |
| Alton Towers, walls and gatehouse 52.98629°N 1.89331°W | | c. 1810–52 | A country house built over a period of years with a succession of architects, including A. W. N. Pugin. It is built in stone with tile roofs, it is in Gothic style, and much of it is unused and in ruins. There is an irregular plan, measuring about 460 feet (140 m) by 250 feet (76 m), much of it is embattled, and it includes towers, turrets and pinnacles. Attached to the house is an embattled wall enclosing two sides of the garden, incorporating an octagonal turret, and ending in a two-storey gatehouse with a Tudor arched carriageway and machicolations. | II* |
| The Roman Bath and wall, Alton Towers; 52.98722°N 1.88794°W | — | 1819 | The bath is an oval pool in coped stone, and in the centre is a stone pinnacle on which is a merboy. To the south of the pool the retaining terrace wall is bowed, and contains an archway. | II |
| Retaining wall of dam, Alton Towers; 52.98786°N 1.89104°W | — | c. 1820 | The retaining wall runs along the southeast side of the boating lake, it is in stone, and is in the form of a bridge. It has nine bays, seven of which contain a four-centred arch, and the outer bays have blind arches. On the wall is an openwork parapet with an octagonal pier at each bay division. | II |
| The Conservatory, wall, steps and urns, Alton Towers; 52.98750°N 1.88910°W | | c. 1824 | The conservatory, designed by Robert Abraham, is in stone and cast iron. There is a single storey, a five-bay central block, the middle bay circular, flanked by recessed eight-bay loggias, and ending in three-bay blocks. The blocks contain panelled pilasters and bracketed cornices, and the loggias have fluted columns. On the top are seven glazed domes with decorative glazing bars and pineapple finials; the central dome is larger with a louvre. Attached is a low wall ending in a flight of steps flanked by cast iron urns, and there are more urns in front of the conservatory. | II* |
| The Orangery, Alton Towers; 52.98782°N 1.89013°W | — | c. 1824 | The orangery is in stone and has one storey and six bays. On the front are rounded segmental arches, in the middle four bays with openwork piers, and in the outer bays with pilasters, and bracketed eaves. On the left bay is a decorative glazed iron dome. | II |
| The Prospect Tower, wall and railings, Alton Towers; 52.98724°N 1.88609°W | | c. 1824 | An observation tower, designed by Robert Abraham in Gothic style, it is in stone and cast iron. The tower has an octagonal plan and three stages reducing in size. In the lower two stages are arcades of four-centred arches, in the upper stage are windows with pointed heads and pointed hoods, and on the top is an ogee glass dome with cast iron tracery. In front of the tower is a stone wall about 10 yards (9.1 m) long on which are cast iron railings forming a Gothic arcade. | II* |
| Fountain south of the Chapel, Alton Towers; 52.98593°N 1.89337°W | — | Early 19th century | The fountain is in stone, and has a circular plan. There is an outer sunken basin with an octagonal pedestal. On this is an inner circular basin on carved animals' feet with an everted rim, and in this is a fountain with a moulded base and pedestal, and an oversailing basin. | II |
| Garden wall east of Alton Towers; 52.98597°N 1.89164°W | — | Early 19th century | The wall encloses the roughly square garden to the east of the house. It is in stone with an embattled parapet, and is attached to the east side of the gatehouse. | II |
| Gate piers and gates at N.G.R. SK 07424335, Alton Towers; 52.98739°N 1.89105°W | — | Early 19th century | The gate piers and gates are in cast iron. The piers are square, they have openwork decorated with rosettes, and are capped by urn finials. Between them is a pair of gates with spear-head railings. | II |
| Gate piers, gates and railings, Alton Towers; 52.98974°N 1.89596°W | — | Early 19th century | The gates are at the original entrance to the park. There are four square stone gate piers with pyramidal caps. The inner pair are larger, and are linked to the outer piers by short lengths of railings with spear-heads. Between the central piers are wrought iron gates. | II |
| Wall and basin, Italian Garden, Alton Towers; 52.98728°N 1.89123°W | — | Early 19th century | The wall encloses the Italian Garden to the northwest, it is in stone, and stretches for about 50 yards (46 m). The wall has a lobed top, and between each lobe is a statue on a pedestal. At the northeast end of the wall is a projecting basin with an everted rim. | II |
| Miniature Bridge, Alton Towers; 52.98691°N 1.88965°W | — | Early 19th century | A footbridge crossing a pond, it is in cast iron with stone piers and cutwaters. The bridge consists of three segmental arches with diamond-pattered spandrels. Between the piers are chains. | II |
| Stables, Alton Towers; 52.98918°N 1.89029°W | — | Early 19th century | The stables are in brick with a stone front and tile roofs, and form four ranges round a rectangular courtyard with an entrance in the middle of each range. The southwest front is in Gothic style, with two storeys, towers and turrets with three storeys, an embattled parapet, and pseudo-machicolations. There are eleven bays, with a square tower in each corner, and square turrets flanking the central four-centred archway. The windows have pointed heads, most are lancets, the wider windows have Y-tracery, and in the tower are loops. | II |
| Stonehenge, Alton Towers; 52.98805°N 1.89009°W | | Early 19th century | A folly constructed from massive stone blocks. These form three bays, the middle bay with two tiers, and have monumental lintels. | II |
| Wall, piers and well north of Swiss Cottage, Alton Towers; 52.98608°N 1.88976°W | — | Early 19th century | The retaining wall is in stone and stretches for about 30 yards (27 m). It is bowed towards the west to form a recess, at the ends of which are circular piers with moulded caps. At the east end, the wall incorporates the arch of a well. | II |
| The Birdcage, Alton Towers; 52.98568°N 1.89217°W | — | Early 19th century | A gazebo with an octagonal plan, it has a stone base, with steps leading to a door to the east. On the base is an arcade of timber columns carrying a hipped roof on which is a cupola with traceried openings and a weathervane. | II |
| Summerhouse, wall and urns south of The Conservatory, Alton Towers; 52.98738°N 1.88995°W | — | Early 19th century | The structures are in stone. The summer house has one storey, a circular plan, three open bays with Tuscan columns and pilasters, a heavy cornice, and a moulded dome with a pineapple finial. At the east end is a round-headed window with Tuscan pilasters. The retaining wall runs for about 250 yards (230 m), it contains panelled piers, and has flat coping and urns. At the east end is a grotto under the summer house. | II |
| Walls, gatepiers and steps southeast of The Conservatory, Alton Towers; 52.98736°N 1.88795°W | — | Early 19th century | The stone walls extend for about 50 yards (46 m) to the north and about 30 yards (27 m) to the east, with gate piers at the junction, and steps at the west end of the north wall. The north wall has a lobed top with a pedestal for a former statue between each lobe. The gate piers are square with panelled sides and on each is a crouching lion. | II |
| The Corkscrew Fountain, Alton Towers; 52.98748°N 1.88690°W | — | Early 19th century | The fountain is in stone, and has a circular plan. It consists of four tiers of shelves between which are spiral fluted pillars diminishing in size upwards. | II |
| The Flag Tower, Alton Towers; 52.98491°N 1.89749°W | | Early 19th century | The tower, which is in Gothic style, is in stone, and has a square plan. There are four stages, with cylindrical corner turrets and an embattled parapet with pseudo-machicolations. The tower contains windows with pointed heads and hood moulds, and in the turrets are loops. In the ground floor is a fore-building with a pointed arch containing a flight of steps. | II |
| The Loggia, wall and steps, Alton Towers; 52.98718°N 1.88828°W | — | Early 19th century | The loggia is in stone, and has one storey and nine bays, each containing a round arch with pilasters and a keystone. Above is a parapet band and a balustraded parapet with square piers between the bays. At the ends, the parapet has an openwork Greek key design. In the centre is a flight of stone steps, and to the left is a retaining wall. | II |
| Wall southwest of the stables, Alton Towers; 52.98908°N 1.89041°W | — | Early 19th century | The retaining wall is in stone, and has a parapet string course and an embattled parapet. Opposite the towers of the stables are turret-like projections. | II |
| Le Refuge, wall, archway and steps east of The Loggia, Alton Towers; 52.98713°N 1.88779°W | — | Early 19th century | The stone wall extends for about 50 yards (46 m) to the east from The Loggia. Towards the east end is an archway with panelled pilasters giving access to a flight of steps. Towards the west is a summer house that has a Tuscan portico distyle in antis with an inscribed frieze. In the central bay is a segmental-headed doorway. | II |
| Wall, steps and piers south of The Loggia, Alton Towers; 52.98714°N 1.88837°W | — | Early 19th century | The retaining wall is in stone and runs for about 150 yards (140 m), and at the ends are panelled piers with trapezoidal caps. Towards the western part of the wall is a pair of piers and a doorway with a pointed arch, both of which lead to a flight of steps up to the terrace in front of the loggia. | II |
| Fountain, walls, steps, lions, urns and sundial south of The Orangery, Alton Towers; 52.98759°N 1.89017°W | — | Early 19th century | The structures are in stone. There are two terrace walls, the northern wall contains a fountain in the form of a staircase, with a solid balustrade with the ends surmounted by a pair of busts. On the steps are three urns, and the fountain head has a scalloped shell motif on a shelf with antefixae. On the southern wall are six urns, and in the centre are steps flanked by crouching lions. Between the walls is a sundial on a square base, with a bulbous pedestal, a moulded neck and an oversailing cap on which is a copper gnomon. | II |
| Pool and fountain south of The Orangery, Alton Towers; 52.98771°N 1.89004°W | — | Early 19th century | The pool is circular, and is in stone with concave sides. In the centre is a fountain, and a lead figure holding a basin. | II |
| White Bridge, wall and gate piers, Alton Towers; 52.98700°N 1.89175°W | — | Early 19th century | The bridge is in stone and consists of a single four-centred arch, with a moulded surround, a balustrade with trefoil-headed arcading, and ending in stepped buttresses. On the left is an embattled abutment with a round-headed niche. The wall is attached to the south, and incorporates a four-centred archway with panelled pilasters and a keystone, and ends in a pair of square piers with chamfered rustication and pyramidal caps. | II |
| Greenlands; 52.99450°N 1.89722°W | — | Early 19th century | A stuccoed stone house with a chamfered eaves band and a tile roof with coped verges. The main part has two storeys and three bays, to the left is a slightly lower extension of two storeys and two bays, and to the right is a single-storey two-bay extension. In the main block is a central doorway and a canted bay window, and most of the other windows have chamfered mullions. | II |
| Pink Lodge; 52.98661°N 1.89879°W | — | Early 19th century | Originally a lodge to Alton Towers, it is in red brick with a pantile roof, and is in Italianate style. The lodge consists of two square towers linked by a single-storey block containing a round-headed doorway with a fanlight. At the top of the block is a wrought iron balustrade over an eaves band that is continued in the towers as a storey band. The left tower has three storeys, the top storey being open. In the ground floor is a slim sash window, and the middle floor contains a round-headed opening. The right tower is wider, and has two storeys and cantilevered overhanging eaves, and it contains slim sash windows, in the upper floor with two lights. | II |
| The Pagoda Fountain and bridge pier, Alton Towers; 52.98637°N 1.88725°W | | 1827 | The fountain is in the form of a Chinese pagoda, it was designed by Robert Abraham, and stands in the Fishpool. It is in cast iron on a stone base of five steps. The pagoda has an octagonal plan, and three stages. Each stage has openwork sides with ogee-headed openings, each of the upper two stages has a balustrade, a bracketed roof, and a canopy with bells hanging from scrolls at the angles. The roof is surmounted by a finial. To the north is a stone pier that formerly supported a bridge. | II* |
| Memorial to the 15th Earl of Shrewsbury, Alton Towers; 52.98699°N 1.89109°W | | c. 1830 | The design of the memorial to the Earl of Salisbury, who had been responsible for the building of the country house, is based in the Choragic Monument of Lysicrates, and is in stone and cast iron. It has an inscribed circular base, on which is a square rusticated pedestal, a stepped plinth, and an oversailing cap. On the base are six Corinthian columns carrying an entablature and a decorated dome with a foliated crest, and inside there is a bust of the Earl on a pedestal. | II* |
| The Swiss Cottage, Alton Towers; 52.98596°N 1.88975°W | — | c. 1840 | The building is in orange brick on a stone plinth, with stone dressings and a tile roof. It is in Tudor style, and consists of a main range and two rear wings. The front has three bays, the middle bay with one storey and an attic, containing a bay window with a hipped roof and a gabled dormer. The outer bays have two storeys and are gabled with shaped bargeboards. The windows have chamfered mullions and contain lights with four-centred arched heads. The doorway is in the side of the right wing and has a square head and a raised surround. | II |
| The Tudor Lodge, Alton Towers; 52.98170°N 1.89589°W | | c. 1840 | The lodge, at the southern entrance to the grounds, was designed by A. W. N. Pugin in Tudor style. It is in stone, and has a tile roof with coped verges. There are three bays, the left two bays have two storeys, the left bay is gabled, and the right bay has one storey. The windows have chamfered mullions, and the lights have four-centred arched heads and panelled spandrels with foliage decoration. In the left bay is a four-centred carriage archway with a moulded arch and a hood mould ending in animals' heads. Above the archway are two oval carved panels, and above them is a larger rectangular carved panel flanked by single-light windows. | II |
| Bridge and steps, Alton Towers railway station 52.98138°N 1.89559°W | — | c. 1849 | The bridge was built to carry a road over the Churnet Valley line. It is in stone, and consists of a single segmental arch with chamfered voussoirs springing from imposts, a moulded parapet band, and a low parapet with iron railings. To the sides are flights of steps with moulded hand rails. | II |
| Former stationmaster's house, Alton Towers railway station 52.98150°N 1.89662°W | | c. 1849 | The house was built for the Churnet Valley line, and is in Italianate style. It is in stone with pantile roofs, and has an L-shaped plan, consisting of a square block with two wings. The main block has three storeys, a storey band, an openwork balcony in the middle floor, and a pyramidal roof with a finial. The wings are gabled, and have one storey and one bay. The windows are casements. | II |
| Former waiting room, Alton Towers railway station 52.98146°N 1.89629°W | | c. 1849 | The railway station was built for the Churnet Valley line, and is in Italianate style. It is in stone with chamfered rustication, and has hipped pantile roofs with overhanging eaves. There is one storey, four bays, and an open-fronted shelter with a fretted fringe to the eaves. The windows have round heads, and above the doorways are semicircular fanlights. | II |
| Stable northwest of The Smithy; 52.99581°N 1.90023°W | — | 1851 | The stable is in stone with moulded eaves, and a tile roof with coped verges. There is one storey and a loft, and two bays. On the front are two doorways with cambered heads, three single-light windows with chamfered surrounds, and two gabled dormers. | II |
| Stable northeast of The Smithy; 52.99582°N 1.90004°W | — | 1851 | The stable is in stone with a chamfered eaves band, and has a tile roof with coped verges on kneelers with ball finials. There is one storey and a loft, and three bays. On the front is a central doorway flanked by windows with deeply chamfered surrounds. In the left gable end is a doorway with a cambered head and above it is a loft door. | II |
| The Old School; 52.99679°N 1.89957°W | — | 1860 | Originally a school and schoolmaster's house, later a private house, it is in stone and has a tile roof. The former schoolroom is to the left; it has one storey, one bay, and contains a three-light chamfered mullioned window to the left, and a gabled porch with rustic bargeboards to the right. The house to the right has one storey and an attic, and one bay, and it contains a fixed window and two-light chamfered mullioned windows. | II |
| Milepost at N.G.R. SK 08104566; 53.00837°N 1.88075°W | | Mid to late 19th century | The milepost is in cast iron, and has a triangular plan and a sloping top. On the top is "FARLEY", and on the sides are the distances to Leek, Ellastone, Rocester, and Uttoxeter. | II |
| Milepost at N.G.R. SK 08554777; 53.02710°N 1.87420°W | — | Mid to late 19th century | The milepost is on the south side of the A52 road. It is in cast iron, and has a triangular plan and a sloping top. On the top is "COTTON", and on the sides are the distances to Froghall, Cheadle, Hanley, Stoke-on-Trent, and Ashbourne. | II |
| Gates and gate piers to Alton Park; 52.98897°N 1.89674°W | — | Late 19th century | The gates and gate piers are at an entrance to the grounds of Alton Towers. They are in wrought iron, there are four square openwork piers with dome and finials, and between them are central and wicket gates. | II |
