= Alton Towers railway station =

Disused railway station in Staffordshire, England

Alton station
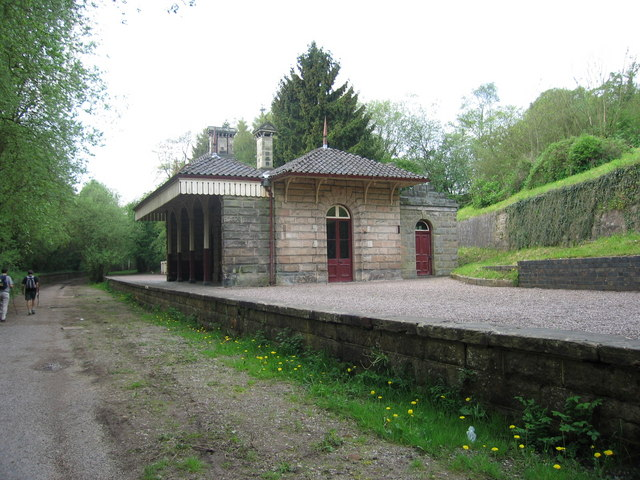
- The remains of Alton Towers station

General information
- Location: Alton, Staffordshire Moorlands, England
- Coordinates: 52.9816°N 1.8968°W
- Grid reference: SK070427
- Platforms: 3

Other information
- Status: Disused

History
- Original company: North Staffordshire Railway
- Post-grouping: London, Midland and Scottish Railway; British Railways

Key dates
- 13 July 1849: Opened as Alton
- January 1954: Renamed Alton Towers
- 4 January 1965: Closed
Location

Alton is a former railway station in Staffordshire, England, which served the village of Alton and the country estate at Alton Towers. Opened in 1849 by the North Staffordshire Railway, the station was a stop on the Churnet Valley line. In 1954, the station was renamed Alton Towers. After its closure in 1965, the station site was purchased by Staffordshire County Council in 1969 to curtail persistent vandalism of the station building. In 1979, it was sold to the Landmark Trust, which reverted the site's name back to Alton and converted the former station buildings into holiday accommodation.

== History ==
At the height of the so-called "Railway Mania", when railways were being built across the whole country, the North Staffordshire Railway (NSR) obtained Parliament's permission to build a number of lines, one of which was the Churnet Valley Line, on 26 June 1845. It ran from North Rode in Cheshire to Uttoxeter in East Staffordshire. A temporary station was erected in Alton which opened on 13 July 1849 and the permanent station buildings opened the following year.

The station's design followed an Italianate villa style, unique in this respect among all NSR stations, which were a Tudor or Jacobean style. The architecture is variously attributed to A.W. Pugin and Henry Arthur Hunt, the latter of whom designed most of the NSR's stations.

Early passengers included many day visitors coming in large numbers from the Staffordshire Potteries to visit nearby Alton Towers, the country estate of the Earl of Shrewsbury. A luggage lift was installed to hoist the Earl's baggage up to Alton Towers. The station also comprised a three-storey tower, which contained the Earl's suite of waiting rooms and its platform was made particularly long to satisfy the Earl's desire to have impressive surroundings in which to receive his guests.

Several additions were made during the 1880s:

- 1882 - goods yard and sidings enlarged, signal box built
- 1882 - waiting room extended with a new booking office
- 1884 - platforms lengthened, pathway directly to the Towers built.

The station experienced a great increase in use from 1924, when Alton Towers was sold to become a tourist attraction, with its gardens and parts of the house open for public use, although it did not become a theme park for several decades afterwards. It became part of the London, Midland and Scottish Railway during the Grouping of 1923. The station then passed on to the London Midland Region of British Railways on nationalisation in 1948 and the line began to decline thereafter.

In January 1954, the station was renamed Alton Towers, in recognition of its previous service to the Alton Towers estate. Passenger service was greatly reduced from 1960, with eventual closure by the British Railways Board occurring in 1965. Vandalism of the waiting room became a problem soon thereafter; the station buildings, platform and sections of line were purchased by Staffordshire County Council in 1969.

Preceding station	Disused railways	Following station
Oakamoor	North Staffordshire Railway; Churnet Valley Line	Denstone

== Design and layout ==
The former station buildings, attributed variously to Augustus Pugin and local architect Henry Arthur Hunt, are of an Italianate villa style unique to the former North Staffordshire Railway. They were built at the request of Charles Chetwynd-Talbot, 19th Earl of Shrewsbury, who owned the Alton Towers estate and wished for an impressive station where he might impress his guests. When in use as a railway station, Alton Towers also possessed a three-storey tower, unusually long platforms and a luggage lift to the Alton Towers estate, all of which were built at the Earl's request.

== The site today ==
The station buildings, which are grade II listed, were acquired by the Landmark Trust and the stationmaster's house converted into holiday accommodation, opening in 1972.

In 2008, the Landmark Trust converted the waiting-room to provide additional accommodation space. The buildings are occasionally open to the public as part of an open day scheme run by the Trust.

== See also ==
- Listed buildings in Farley, Staffordshire
