= Oakamoor railway station =

Former railway station in England

Oakamoor
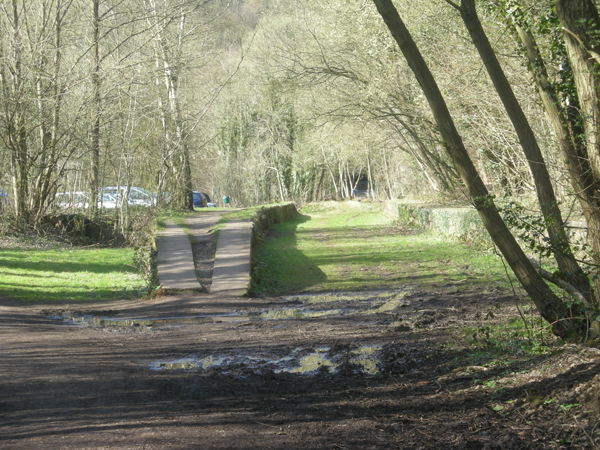
- Platform remains in 2009

General information
- Location: Oakamoor, Staffordshire Moorlands, Staffordshire; England
- Coordinates: 52.9971°N 1.9219°W
- Grid reference: SK053444
- Platforms: 3

Other information
- Status: Disused

History
- Original company: North Staffordshire Railway
- Post-grouping: London, Midland and Scottish Railway; British Railways London Midland Region

Key dates
- 1 September 1849: Opened
- 4 January 1965: Closed
Location

Oakamoor railway station is a closed railway station in the Churnet Valley, Staffordshire. The station was opened in 1849 as part of the Churnet Valley Line constructed by the North Staffordshire Railway. Serving the village of Oakamoor the station remained open until 1965 when all services were withdrawn, A little north of the station, freight traffic from Oakamoor Sand Sidings continued until 1988.

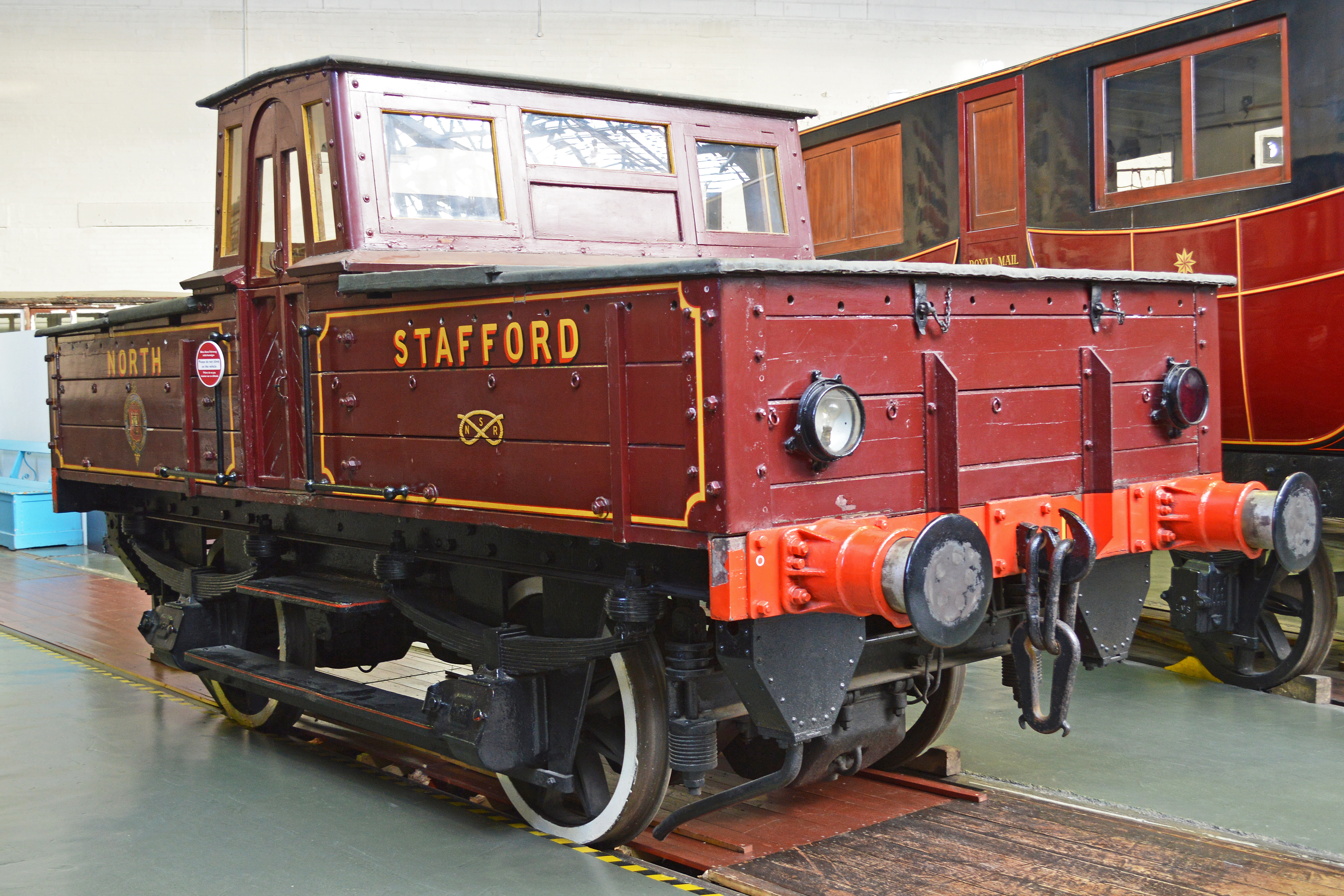
NSR Battery electric locomotive built 1917 for use at Oakamoor

From 1917 until 1963 shunting in these sidings was performed by a battery-electric locomotive, built on a wagon chassis. This has now been preserved at the National Railway Museum.

== Preservation ==
The track has been lifted from froghall junction with the track bed owned by Churnet Valley Railway (CVR). In September 2008, the first service for 20 years ran to Oakamoor with a CVR shareholders' special before the track was lifted owing to its poor condition.

The railway trackbed that extends down the Churnet Valley to the former station at Alton has been converted to a footpath.

The CVR hopes to one day reach Oakamoor station as part of a project in bringing the CVR into becoming the largest preserved railway network within the centre of England.

| Preceding station | Disused railways | Following station |
|---|---|---|
| Kingsley and Froghall | North Staffordshire Railway; Churnet Valley Line | Alton Towers |
