= Oakamoor =

Village in Staffordshire, England

Coordinates: 53.000°N 1.91667°W

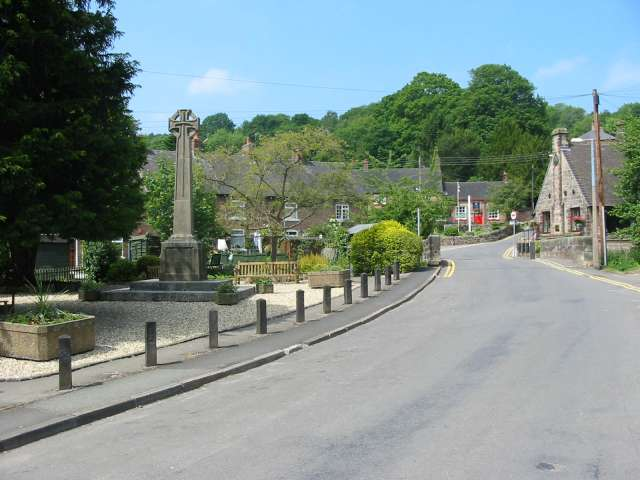
- Village centre

- Location within Staffordshire
- Population: 593 (2011 census)
- OS grid reference: SK056447
- District: Staffordshire Moorlands
- Shire county: Staffordshire
- Region: West Midlands
- Country: England
- Sovereign state: United Kingdom
- Post town: Stoke-on-Trent
- Postcode district: ST10
- Dialling code: 01538
- Police: Staffordshire
- Fire: Staffordshire
- Ambulance: West Midlands
- UK Parliament: Staffordshire Moorlands

Oakamoor is a small village in north Staffordshire, England.

Although it is now a rural area, it has an industrial past which drew on the natural resources of the Churnet valley. Iron was smelted from medieval times. Copper and timber were also important to the local economy.

In the nineteenth century Thomas Bolton's copperworks near the River Churnet supplied copper wire for the first transatlantic telegraph cable. The buildings of the Thomas Bolton factory were demolished in 1966. The company merged with others in 1984 to form “Thomas Bolton and Johnson” with factories elsewhere. In 2014, the company went into administration, potentially ending copper manufacturing in Great Britain.

Lightoaks Hall on Cheadle Road dates from the 1820s and was built for the Bolton family. Holy Trinity parish church, on Church Bank, was erected in 1832, at a cost of £1600, raised by subscription and a grant from the Church Building Society.

Clement Lindley Wragge, later a notable meteorologist, was raised in Oakamoor from 1852-1865.

The Churnet Valley line passed through Oakamoor. Oakamoor railway station was closed down in 1967. The railway track leading to Alton Towers railway station has been converted to a footpath.

== Media interest ==
In 2004 Oakamoor was the subject of a television programme in the Channel 4 Time Team archaeology series, which investigated the remains of The Old Furnace.

== See also ==
- Listed buildings in Oakamoor
