= Uttoxeter Canal =

Former canal in England

Coordinates: 53.0255°N 1.9627°W

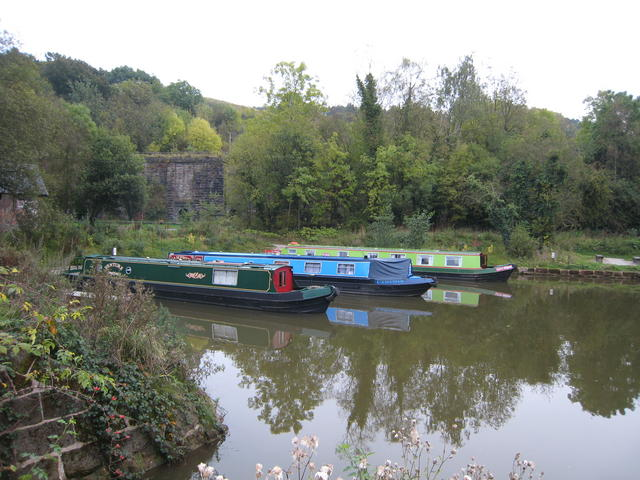
- The basin below lock 1, restored in 2005.
- Interactive map of Uttoxeter Canal

Specifications
- Length: 13 miles (21 km)
- Locks: 19
- Status: Possible restoration

History
- Original owner: Trent and Mersey Canal Company
- Principal engineer: John Rennie
- Date of act: 1797
- Date completed: 13 November 1811
- Date closed: 15 January 1849 (replaced by railway)
- Date restored: July 2005 (1 lock and basin)

Geography
- Start point: Froghall
- End point: Uttoxeter
- Branch of: Caldon Canal

The Uttoxeter Canal pronounced (listen) was a thirteen-mile extension of the Caldon Canal running from Froghall as far as Uttoxeter in Staffordshire, England. It was authorised in 1797, but did not open until 1811. With the exception of the first lock and basin at Froghall, it closed in 1849, in order that the Churnet Valley line of the North Staffordshire Railway could be constructed along its length. The railway has since been dismantled and there are plans to reinstate the canal.

== History ==
The Uttoxeter Canal was promoted by the Trent and Mersey Canal Company and authorised by an act of Parliament, the Trent and Mersey Canal Act 1797 (37 Geo. 3. c. 81). This was a political move, designed to prevent a rival scheme for a canal to Uttoxeter. The planned Commercial Canal was intended to link the Chester Canal at Nantwich to the Ashby Canal at Moira, passing through Stoke-on-Trent and Uttoxeter, and would have had a serious impact on the profitability of the Trent and Mersey Company if it had been built.

Powers to alter the proposed route at Alton were included in the Trent and Mersey Canal (Railways) Act 1802 (42 Geo. 3. c. xxv), but because the new canal was not expected to be profitable, construction was delayed. Ten years after the act was passed, work began under the direction of the canal engineer John Rennie, with the 13-mile (21 km) canal opening on 3 September 1811. It is sometimes referred to as a branch of the Caldon Canal. 19 locks were required to drop the level of the canal as it passed down the valley of the River Churnet.

Froghall Basin was the transshipment point for limestone brought from Caldon Low quarries, a few miles to the east. The limestone was carried along a plate tramway, one of the first to use iron rails, which was built in 1758. The tramway was rebuilt on a new alignment in 1785, and completely rebuilt in 1800. In 1849, it was replaced by a cable railway. Three locomotives worked the tracks at Froghall Basin, named Toad, Frog and Bobs. The quarries ceased operation in 1920.

There was a proposal to construct a branch to Ashbourne, and another in 1839 to extend the canal along the Dove Valley to link up with the Trent and Mersey Canal, but no details of the precise routes have survived. The canal was not a financial success, and the Trent and Mersey Company made plans to close it. However, the canal company was taken over by the North Staffordshire Railway, and with the exception of the first lock and the basin at Froghall, which remained in use until about 1930, the canal was closed by the railway company on 15 January 1849. A large part of it was subsequently filled in, and used for the route of the Churnet Valley railway line (which incidentally, although it is now dismantled, had the first automatic, train-operated level-crossing in the UK, at Spath, just outside Uttoxeter.)

A few bridges from the Uttoxeter Canal still exist, with the occasional milepost visible, including two which have been relocated to the bowling green in Denstone village. Very little can be seen of the canal in Uttoxeter, but there is still evidence it existed, as there is an area called "The Wharf".

== Restoration ==
The Caldon Canal Society was formed in 1961, and worked to reopen the Caldon Canal to Froghall. This was achieved in 1974, and Froghall Wharf remained the terminus for some 25 years. However, they started to think about restoring the first lock on the Uttoxeter Canal, and the basin below it, in 2000. This became known as "Restoration Froghall" in early 2003, and included plans for better facilities at the terminus. The scheme was costed at £800,000, and received a grant from the North-East Staffordshire Rural Regeneration Funds. At the end of the year, a formal partnership between British Waterways and the newly-renamed Caldon and Uttoxeter Canals Trust was announced, with the stated intention of completing the project by early 2005. It took a little longer than intended, but the lock and basin were formally reopened in July 2005.

The trust then turned its attention to the feasibility of restoring the canal from Froghall to Uttoxeter. The situation was complicated by the fact that the revived Churnet Valley Railway terminated at Froghall, and they were originally going to reopen the railway to Oakamoor, but since 2018 they have been engaged in extending their line at the opposite end towards Leek. There were also threats at the southern end, when plans for a bypass which would be built along the line of the canal from Denstone to Alton Towers were announced. The scheme would have cost £12 million, and be largely funded by the theme park. The trust campaigned against it, using the provisions of PPG13, a government guideline that states that new road schemes should not hinder canal restoration schemes, and the new management of Alton Towers, who were in favour of canal restoration, argued that the scheme was unnecessary, as congestion only occurred during the six weeks of the summer school holidays.

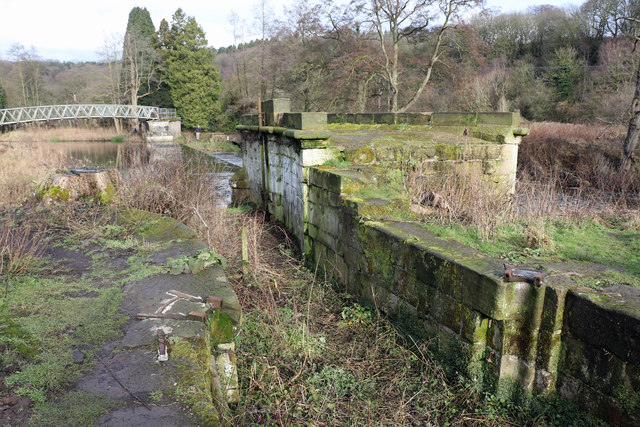
The flood lock below Crumpwood Weir

To the south of Denstone, the original route is blocked by the JCB factory at Rocester, which has been built over the locations of Cottons and Taylors locks. Staffordshire County Council and the trust jointly commissioned a feasibility report in 2009, which was produced by the engineering consultancy Halcrow Group, and examined whether there was a possible route to the south of Denstone, terminating at the Uttoxeter gravel pits, which were nearly worked out. After discarding the original route with small diversions, they identified two possible routes which would be relatively easy to construct, both passing to the east of the JCB site.

During the 2010s, the trust concentrated most of their effort on the 1.5 miles (2.4 km) from Alton to Crumpwood Weir, most of which is owned by the Alton Towers theme park. Bridge 70 was the only original bridge still remaining on the canal, but its ownership could not be established. Staffordshire Moorlands District Council issued a compulsory purchase order against it, and having acquired it, sold it to the trust for £2. The bridge had been restored by September 2016, and some 330 yards (300 m) of the adjacent towpath was repaired and resurfaced. The Waterway Recovery Group have visited the canal several times, and have cleared most of the trees on this section, including a huge sycamore whose roots were damaging Crumpwood Weir. They also discovered that Carringtons Lock, immediately above the weir, was still largely intact, although buried, and found a wharf originally built by Lord Shrewsbury in the early 1800s to enable construction materials for Alton Towers House to be unloaded. Divers have investigated Crumpwood Weir, and although it is heavily silted at one end, it is in good condition. It was built by John Rennie so that the canal could cross the river on the level, rather than needing an aqueduct. The weir itself, which is grade II listed, is around 33 yards (30 m) long, with abutments at both ends. Water drops 5 feet (1.5 m) vertically, and then down an inclined slope.

Just to the south of the weir, the lock keepers cottage, which had been derelict for many years, was sold in August 2018 and was undergoing renovation in early 2019. There was a water pumping station to the north of the weir, which was no longer in use, and the Environment Agency announced their intention to construct a fish ladder there in 2019, to enable trout and salmon to migrate up the river more easily. The pumping station contains water turbines, which were used to pump drinking water to the local community, and the Larinier fish pass consists of a resting pool within the pump house, with the fish using the inlet and outlet pipes from the turbines to reach it. It is expected that it will be possible to operate the turbines from time to time to demonstrate how the heritage asset worked. As part of the work, one of the turbines was removed, so that it can be displayed, and the project was carried out by the Environment Agency, helped by JCB who loaned heavy equipment, and the Staffordshire Wildlife Trust. The fish pass enables fish to negotiate the 9-foot (2.7 m) difference in height, and will enable salmon, trout, grayling and chub to colonise 4.3 miles (7 km) of river above the weir. The structure was operational by September 2019.

== See also ==
- Canals of Great Britain
- History of the British canal system

== Bibliography ==
- Dean, Richard (1997). Canals of North Staffordshire (Historical map). M & M Baldwin. ISBN 978-0-947712-32-7.
- Denny, Andrew (February 2018). "Uncovering the Uttoxeter". Waterways World. ISSN 0309-1422.
- Harris, Dave (2004). "Spath Level Crossing". samhallas.co.uk. Archived from the original on 16 August 2004.
- Nicholson (2006). Nicholson Guides Vol 4: Four Counties and the Welsh Canals. Harper Collins. ISBN 978-0-00-721112-8.
- Potter, Hugh (June 2008). "The Alton Towers Canal". Waterways World. ISSN 0309-1422.
- Shead, Jim (March 2006). "Canal to Nowhere". Waterways World. ISSN 0309-1422. Archived from the original on 11 October 2017.
- Squires, Roger (2008). Britain's restored canals. Landmark Publishing. ISBN 978-1-84306-331-5.
