= History of Alton Towers =

Former country estate in Staffordshire

Alton Towers
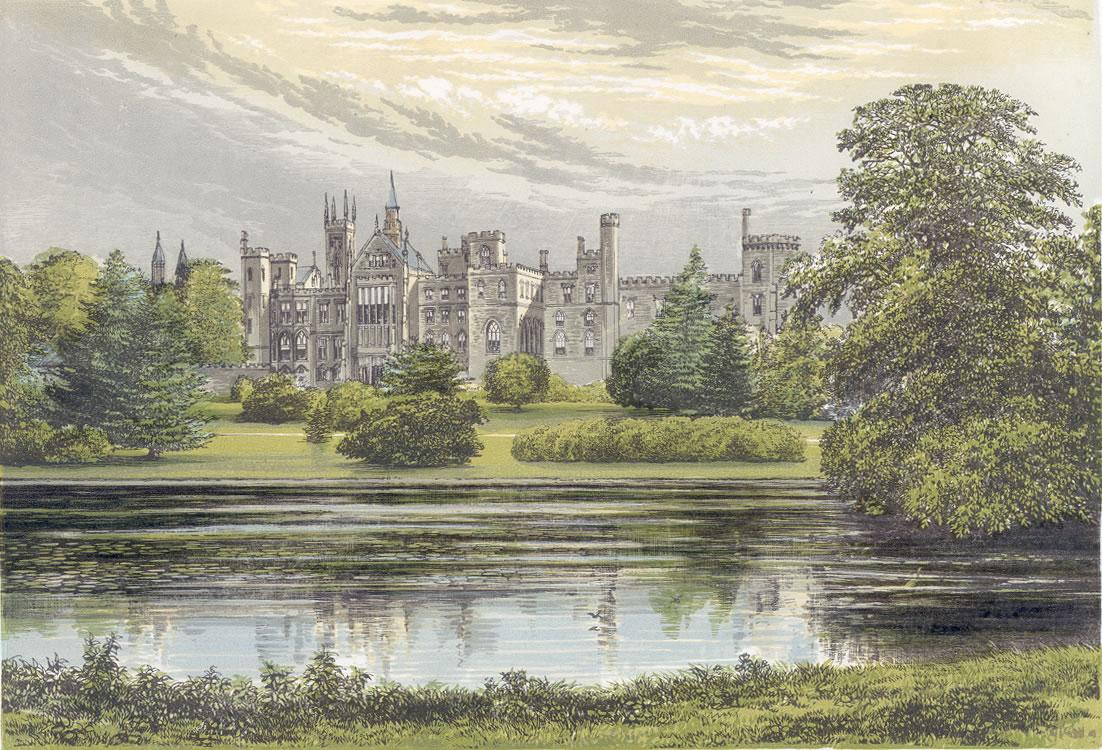
- Alton Towers from Morris's Seats of Noblemen and Gentlemen (c.1880)

- Location within Staffordshire
- Former names: Alverton Lodge, Alton Abbey

General information
- Status: Derelict
- Type: Stately home
- Architectural style: Gothic Revival
- Location: Alton, Staffordshire, England
- Coordinates: 52°59′9.89″N 1°53′36.30″W
- Construction started: 1811
- Completed: 1852
- Destroyed: 1951
- Owner: LondonMetric Property

Listed Building – Grade II*
- Reference no.: 1000191

Alton Towers is a historic estate located near the village of Alton in Staffordshire, England. It was the seat of the Earls of Shrewsbury during the 19th century. The area around Alton Towers has seen human habitation for more than a thousand years. The estate is today home to the Alton Towers theme park, opened in 1980.

== Early history ==
An Iron Age fort was built on Bunbury Hill (c. 1st century BC) which is now occupied by the Alton Towers estate. In about 700 AD, the Saxon king Ceolred of Mercia built a fortress on the hill. King Ine of Wessex besieged the site in 716 AD. The ensuing battle, which ended in stalemate, caused such a loss of life the place was called Slain Hollow (which later became the estate's oriental water garden).

In the late 11th century, Alton Castle was built following the Norman Conquest above the Churnet Valley, in the village of Alton, Staffordshire. It is about 1 mi (1.6 km) from the present-day Alton Towers. By the 12th century, the large manorial estate had been given to knight Bertram II de Verdun (died 1129/30), as a reward for his participation in the Crusades. In 1318, the estate passed to Thomas de Furnival when he married Joan de Verdun; he died crusading in the Holy Land in 1348. In 1406, Sir John Talbot acquired the estate when he married Maud, the eldest daughter of Thomas de Furnivall, 3rd Baron Furnivall. Talbot became the second created Earl of Shrewsbury in 1442 after the title was forfeited by the third earl of the first creation in 1102. The Norman castle was destroyed during the English Civil War.

== Stately home and gardens ==
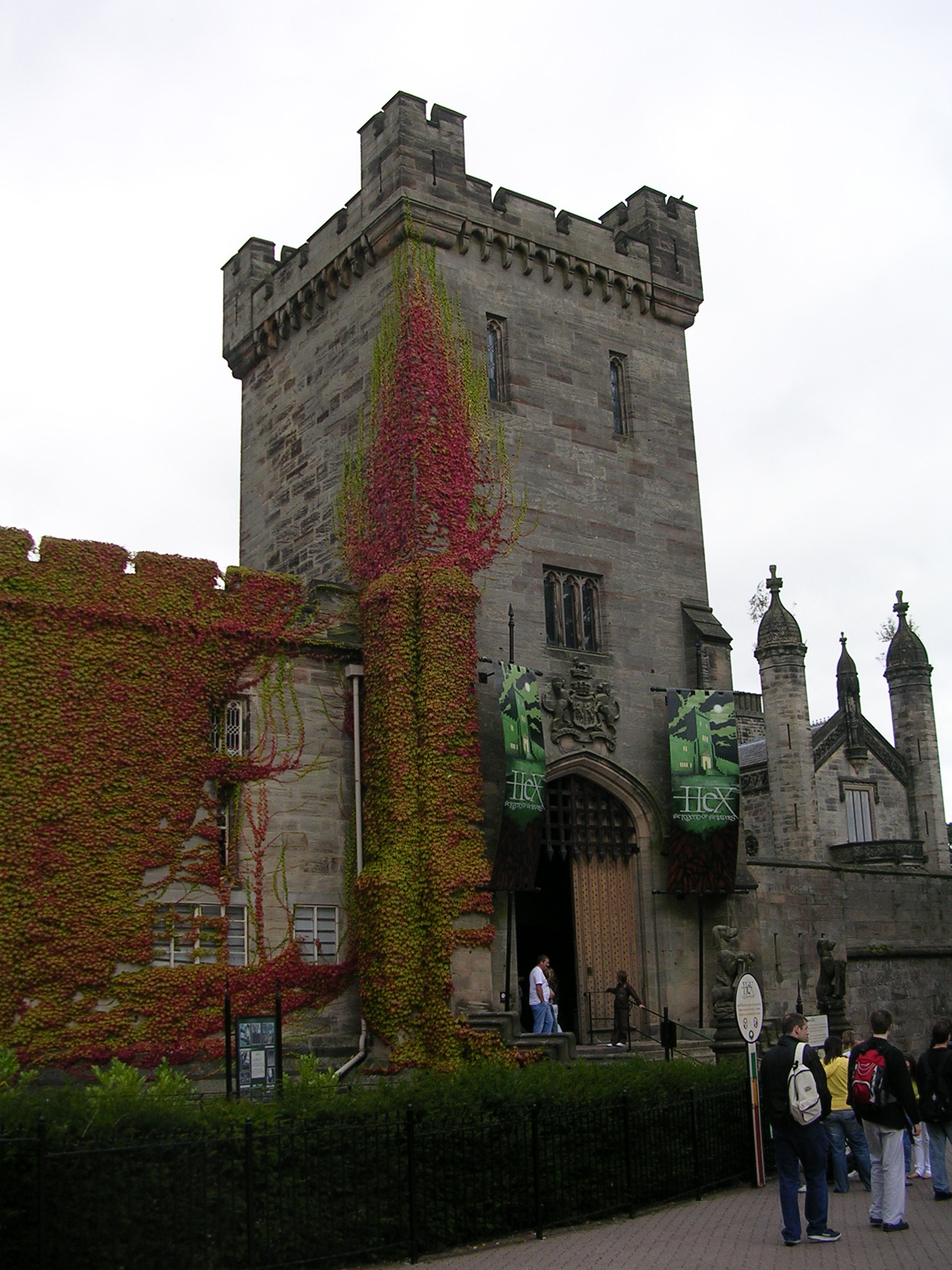
The neo-gothic tower of the former guest entrance to the house

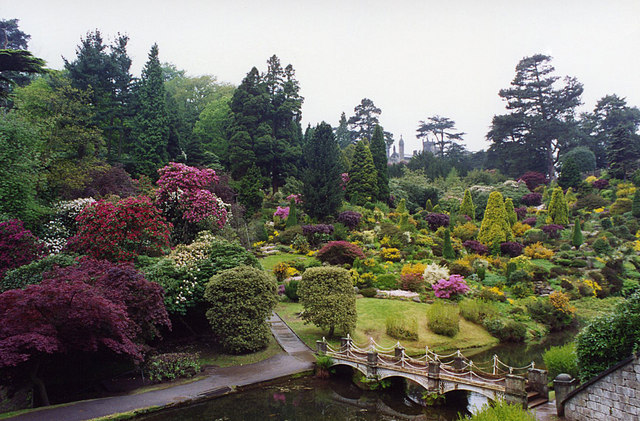
Part of the restored water gardens at Alton Towers

In the 17th century, a hunting lodge known as "Alverton Lodge" ("Alverton" being the ancient name for "Alton") was constructed on the site of what was to become Alton Towers. The three-storey structure featured a round tower. The house was split into two properties, one of which was rented by a tenant while the other was used by the Talbots as a summer residence, their main residence being at Heythrop Park in Oxfordshire.

Charles Talbot, 15th Earl of Shrewsbury, commissioned a redevelopment of Alverton Lodge as a Gothic-style country house, beginning in 1811. Over the next decade, architects including Thomas Allason, William Hollins, and Thomas Hopper contributed to the development. A wharf was added to the nearby Uttoxeter Canal to unload construction materials. Work included a drawing room, dining room, chapel, library, long gallery, banqueting hall, conservatory, and entrance hall, as well as incorporating and remodelling the existing lodge. As a result, the building was doubled in size. The new house was named "Alton Abbey", though it had no religious status. Work also included laying the foundations for the Flag Tower.

In 1814, Lord Shrewsbury and his wife moved permanently into the new house. Work then began on turning the farmland around the house into one of the largest formal gardens in Britain. Several gardens were planted, including a Dutch garden and a rock garden. More than 13,000 trees were also planted in the landscaped parkland. The gardens in the valley leading down to the River Churnet hosted a variety of features. These included a Pagoda fountain which was fed by water from a spring at Ramshorn that passed through various lakes and pools, cast iron garden conservatories designed by Robert Abrahams, a "Swiss Cottage" that hosted a Welsh harpist and a copy of Lysicrates' Choragic Monument from Athens.

After the 15th Earl died in 1827, he was succeeded by his nephew John, 16th Earl of Shrewsbury, who completed the gardens and house started by his uncle. In 1831, the Shrewsburys' principal residence in Heythrop burned down. The 16th Earl then came to live at Alton Abbey permanently, bringing everything that could be saved from Heythrop. The property was significantly further extended with new wings, a new larger chapel and galleries, and renamed "Alton Towers".

Noted architect Augustus Pugin subsequently conducted multiple further alterations, such as a new banqueting hall, an additional gallery and upper floors to the halls.

In 1852, following the death of the 16th Earl, Alton Towers was briefly inherited by his cousin, Bertram, 17th Earl of Shrewsbury but when he died four years later at the age of 24, all work on the house ceased and no further alterations would be made to the property by his family. As there was no direct heir to the estate, Bertram left the earldom and Alton Towers to a younger son of The 14th Duke of Norfolk but this was contested by Henry, 18th Earl of Shrewsbury, of Ingestre Hall, a distant cousin of the 17th earl, who filed a legal writ to determine lawful ownership of Alton Towers. As the contents of the house were not contested, everything within the house was auctioned off in a 29-day sale of 4,000 lots.

In 1857, the 18th Earl of Shrewsbury succeeded to the earldom, and two years later he acquired the Alton Towers Estate. In celebration, the earl held a procession through Staffordshire on 13 April 1860. Beginning in Uttoxeter, it stretched over a mile with up to 40,000 people in the grounds of Alton Towers at the end. The Chetwynd-Talbots' main home was Ingestre Hall and they only lived at Alton Towers while Ingestre was being rebuilt following a fire. The 19th Earl opened the grounds to the public at certain times of the year to raise money to help refurbish parts of the house.

During the 1890s, the 20th Earl of Shrewsbury started the tradition of summer fetes at Alton. As well as the gardens, people were attracted with fireworks displays, balloon festivals, clowns, and exhibitions of instruments of torture. In 1896, the earl and countess separated: the earl went to live at Ingestre and the countess stayed at Alton. The house began to decay and the grounds became neglected because the earl did not pay for upkeep. The 20th earl was a businessman who is best known for founding the manufacturer of Talbot cars in 1902. In November 1918, the earl decided to sell off the majority of the estate by auction. The countess continued to live on the estate for another two years after the earl died in 1921.

=== Sale and opening to the public ===
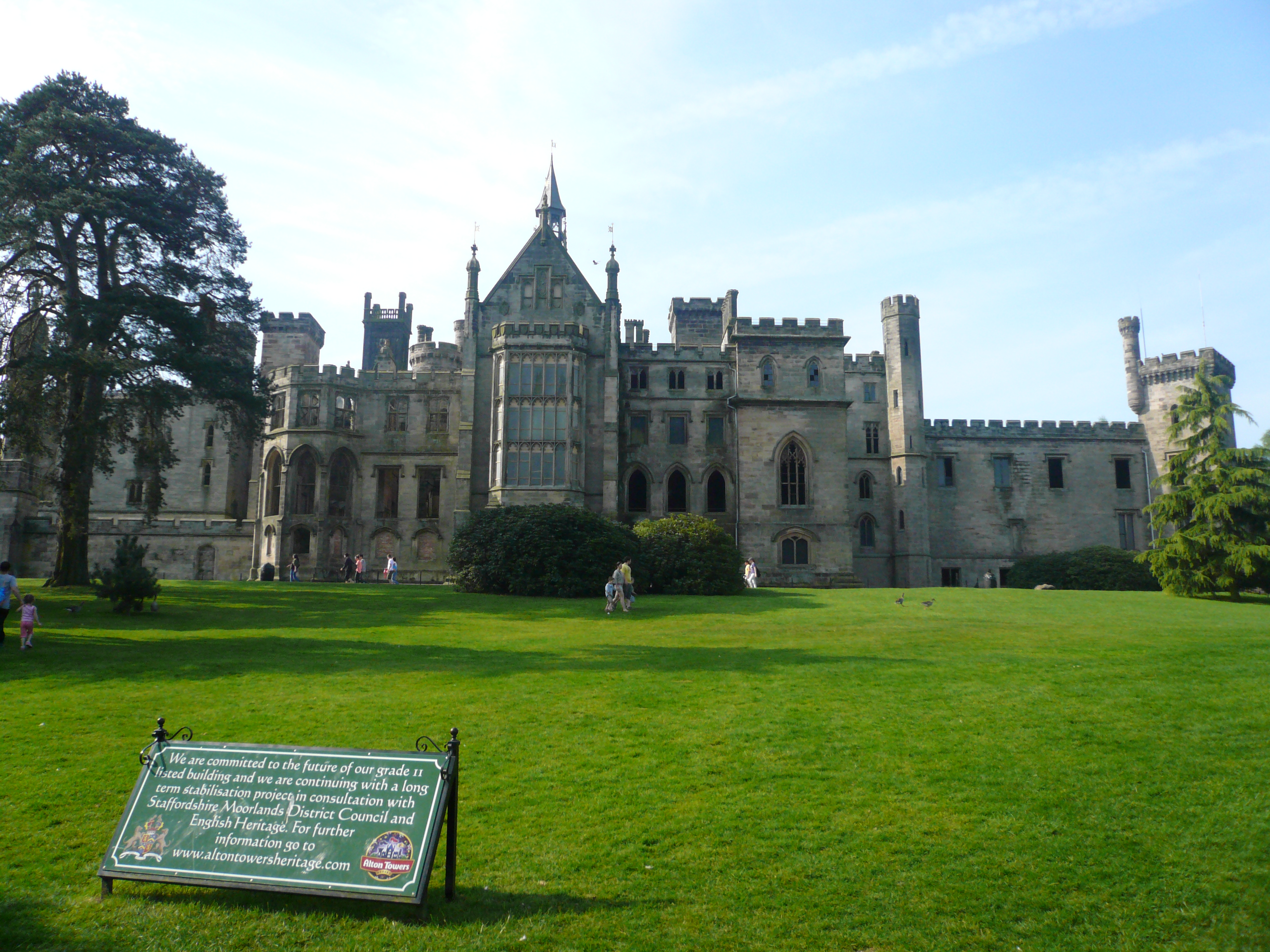
The present day house ruin viewed from across the lawn

In 1924, the remaining estate was sold to a group of local businessmen, who formed Alton Towers Limited. The grounds and house were kept open to the public. Areas of the house were adapted with cafés and toilets, with most the Earl's contents auctioned off.

During the Second World War, Alton Towers was requisitioned by the War Office as an officer training unit and the grounds were closed to the public until the 1950s. It is a common misconception that military occupation of the estate was the cause of the house's dereliction at this time.

In 1950, the estate returned to the control of Alton Towers Ltd. Following this, new majority shareholder, Dennis Bagshaw, sold the house's lead roofing and undertook demolition of the interiors in 1951–52, reducing it to a stone ruin.

From this time, the site operated as a leisure park and several attractions were added in the grounds. A 2 foot gauge miniature railway was opened (closed 1997). Four years later, an indoor model railway, which had taken nearly three years to build, was opened in the chapel entrance. Up to 500 metres (1,600 ft) of track encompassed a circuit covering more than 74 square metres (800 sq ft); the model also used about 100 gallons of water for its river and lake features. Visitors were required to pay a separate admission charge to view the attraction.

The model railway had 35 locomotives which hauled more than 200 items of rolling stock. The layout featured various trains representing examples from British railways, Italian electric trains with pantographs and Canadian Pacific Railways. Marketing literature often claimed the model layout was "the largest of its kind in the world". The chapel was later restored in 1993, and the railway was removed and sold at auction.

During the 1960s, the park continued to grow, adding a chairlift, and a small fair behind the ruins of the main house.

In 1973, the daughter of Dennis Bagshaw had married John Broome, who became involved in the family business. By 1978, concrete floors were built in the house ruins so that areas could be re-opened to the public. It wasn't until 1984 that many features of the original estate were designated listed status, including the house ruins as Grade II*. By 1979, John Broome became Chairman of Alton Towers Ltd and began to develop a theme park within the grounds. The Alpine Bobsled also opened in 1979.

== Theme park ==
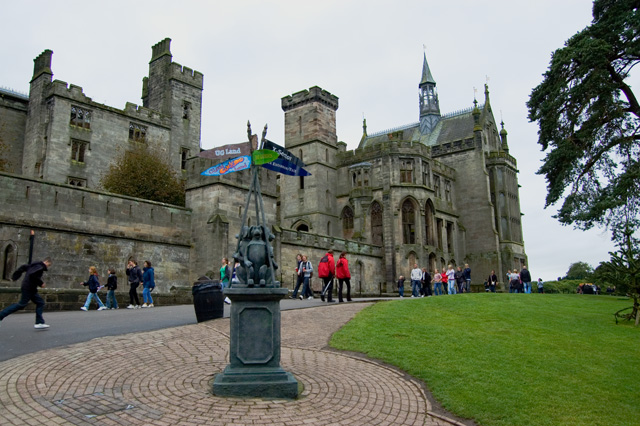
Alton Towers in 2009

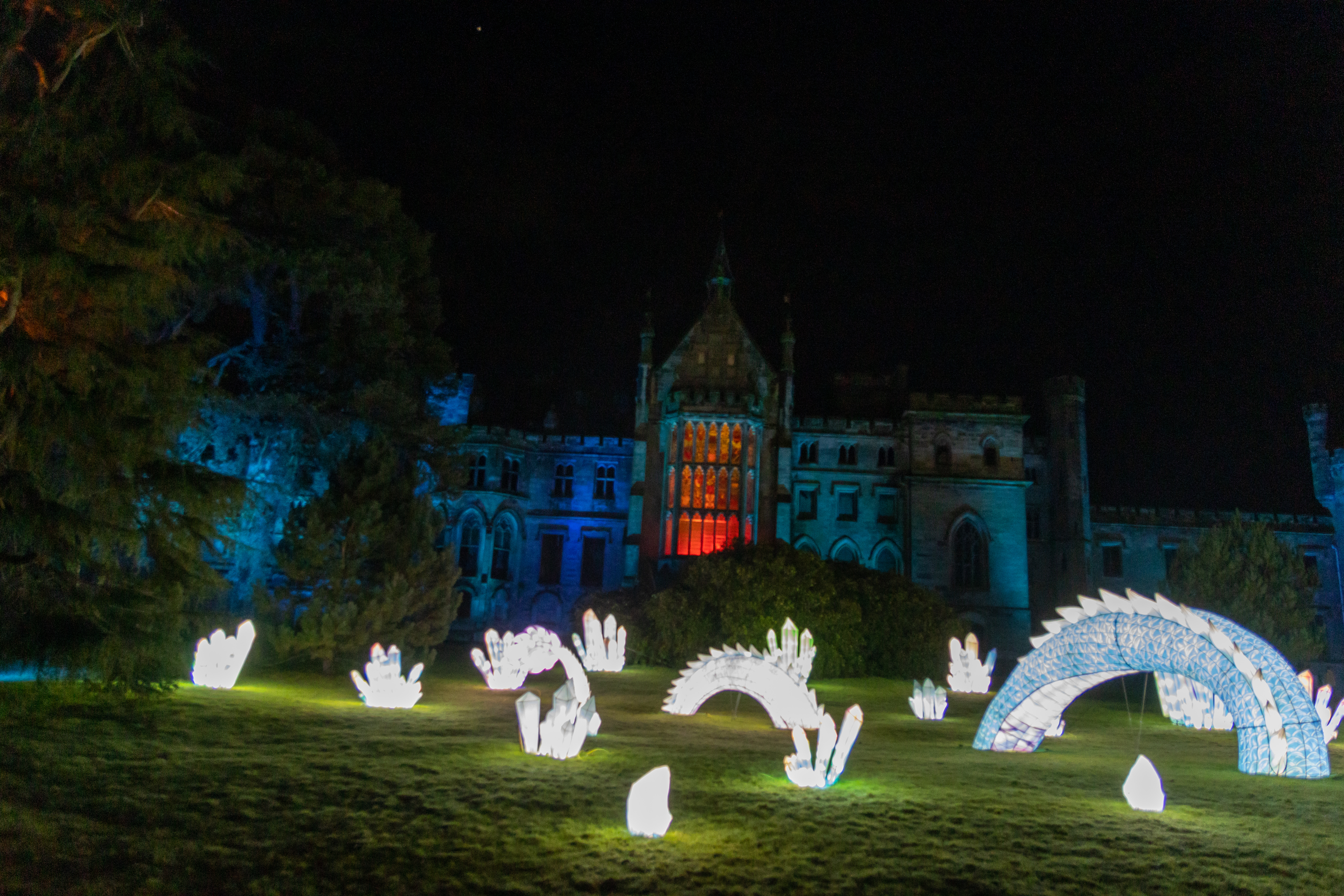
Alton Towers at night

Under the new management of John Broome, Alton Towers officially opened as a theme park in 1980 with the change to a pay-one-price ticket and new attractions, including the Corkscrew roller-coaster and Pirate Ship. In 1981, Talbot Street, the park's first permanent themed area, was opened on the site of the fairground behind the Towers, as well as the Log Flume constructed next to the Ingestre courtyard. In 1984, the park opened its second roller coaster, The Black Hole. Throughout the 1980s, more attractions, areas and rides were opened.

In 1990, the park was purchased by The Tussauds Group. The change of ownership heralded another era of major development with large new attractions and areas being built, including the dark rides The Haunted House (1992) and Toyland Tours (1994), thrill rides such as Nemesis (1994), Oblivion (1998), and Air (now known as Galactica) (2002), and a hotel complex in 1996.

The Tussauds Group was acquired by investment groups Charterhouse in 1998 and Dubai International Capital (DIC) in 2005, twice transferring ownership of Alton Towers. The Tussauds Group was bought by Merlin Entertainments in March 2007 for over £1 billion from DIC. Merlin subsequently sold Alton Towers in July 2007 to Nick Leslau and his investment firm Prestbury on a 35-year lease-back agreement, and have operated the site since.

== See also ==
- Listed buildings in Farley, Staffordshire
- Earls of Shrewsbury
