= Alton, Staffordshire =

Village in Staffordshire, England

Coordinates: 52.977°N 1.890°W

Alton
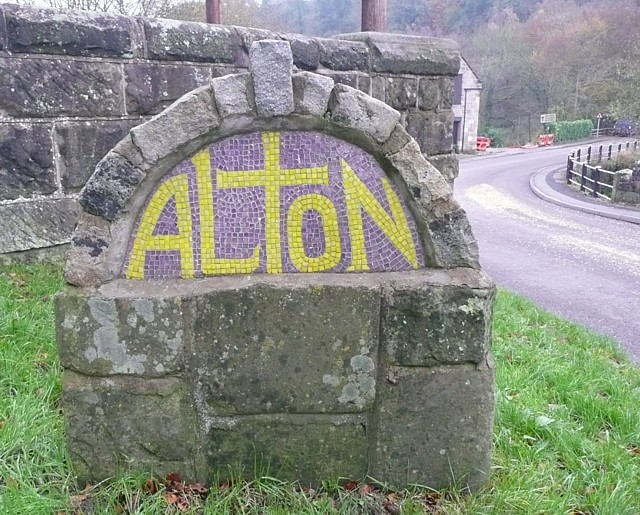
- Village sign

- Location within Staffordshire
- Population: 1,226 (2011)
- OS grid reference: SK073422
- District: Staffordshire Moorlands
- Shire county: Staffordshire
- Region: West Midlands
- Country: England
- Sovereign state: United Kingdom
- Post town: Stoke-on-Trent
- Postcode district: ST10
- Dialling code: 01538
- Police: Staffordshire
- Fire: Staffordshire
- Ambulance: West Midlands
- UK Parliament: Staffordshire Moorlands

Alton (UK: /ˈɒltən/ OL-tən) is a village in Staffordshire, England. It is noted for the theme park Alton Towers, the UK's biggest and most famous theme park built around the site of Alton Mansion, which was owned by the Earls of Shrewsbury, and designed by Augustus Pugin. In the 1914 map by Whiston, there were copper works in the village.

The village is on the eastern side of the Churnet. It is mentioned in the Domesday Book, and contains numerous buildings of architectural interest; the Round-House, Alton Castle (now a Catholic youth retreat centre), St Peter's Church, The Malt House, St John's Church and Alton Towers.

Alton was served by the Alton railway station which was opened by the North Staffordshire Railway on 13 July 1849 and closed in January 1965.

The Chained Oak in Alton has been made famous by the ride Hex – The Legend of the Towers at Alton Towers and the legend involving the Earl of Shrewsbury.

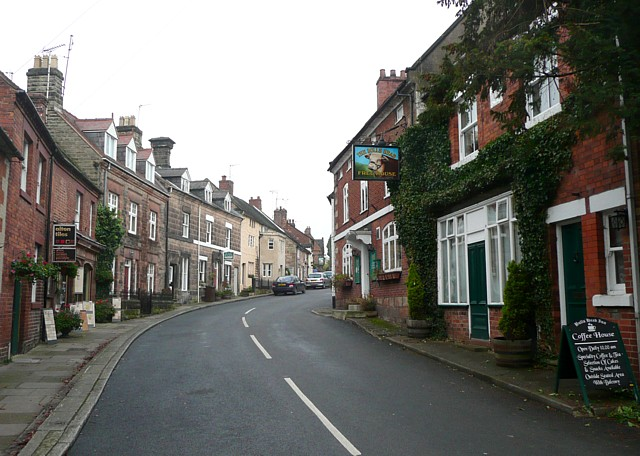
High Street, Alton

== See also ==
- Listed buildings in Alton, Staffordshire
