= River Churnet =

River in Staffordshire, England

Coordinates: 52°56′8.9″N 1°50′57.5″W

Churnet (Staffordshire)
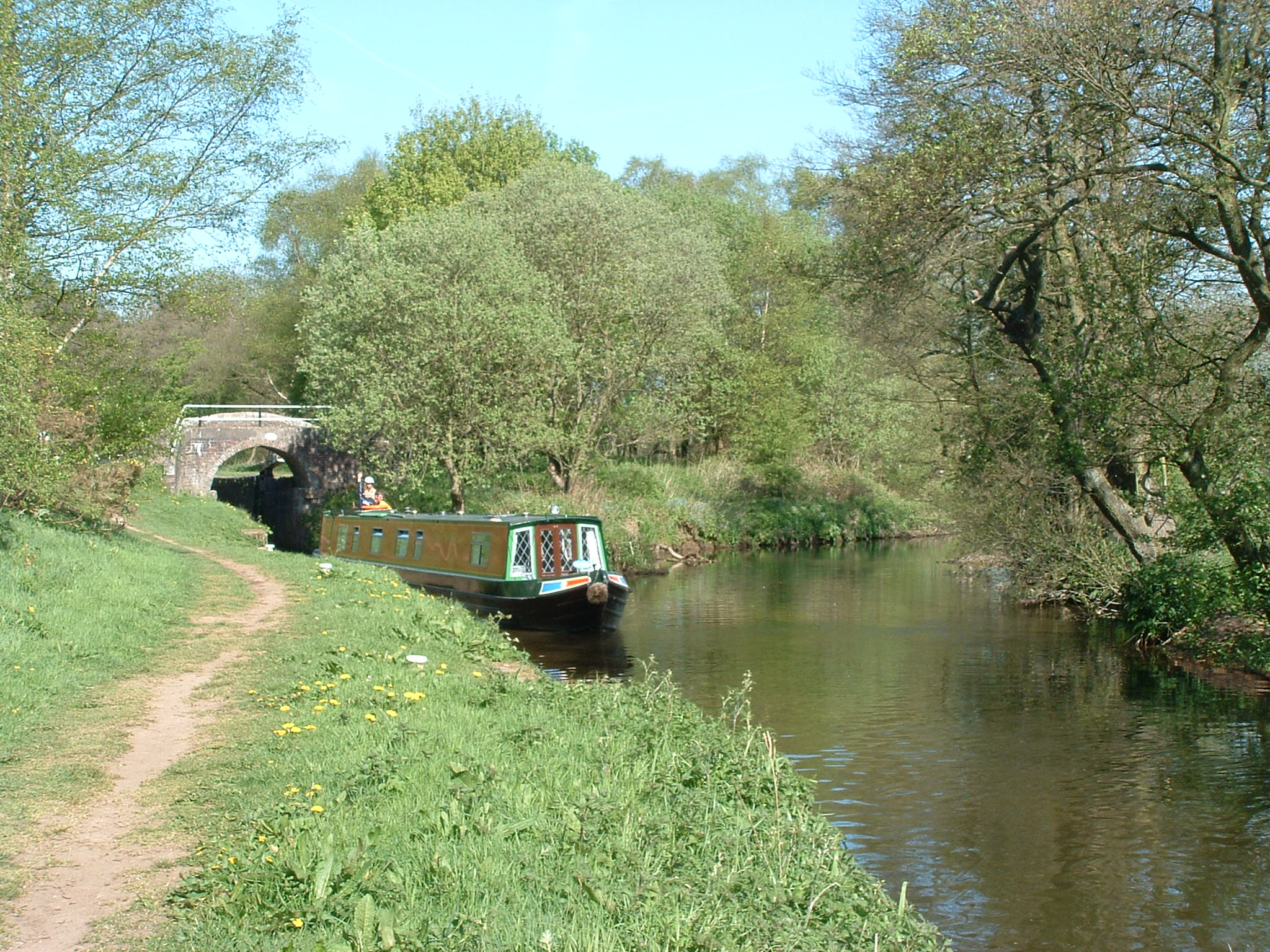
- A narrowboat has just locked down into the Churnet river at Oak Meadow Ford lock

Location
- Country: England
- Region: Staffordshire
- District: The Roaches, Leek, Churnet Valley

Physical characteristics
- Source
  - location: The Roaches, Staffordshire Moorlands, Staffordshire, England
  - elevation: 460 m (1,510 ft)
- Mouth
  - location: Near Combridge, East Staffordshire, England

The River Churnet is a river in Staffordshire, England. It is a tributary of the River Dove.

== Etymology ==
The origins of the name "Churnet" are unknown, though it is thought to derive from the pre-English, British name for the river.

== Course ==
The source of the river is located over 1,000 feet (300 m) above sea level in the Staffordshire moorlands, near the gritstone escarpment of the Roaches, and next to the A53 Leek to Buxton road, It is only a few hundred yards away from Black Brook which ultimately, through the Dane and Weaver, flows into the Irish Sea; however, the Churnet, through the Dove, Trent and Humber Estuary, ultimately flows into the North Sea.

After flowing downhill for a few miles it reaches Tittesworth Reservoir, a major supplier of fresh water to the Potteries and Leek. After it leaves the dam at Tittesworth, it flows into the ancient market town of Leek, where it was used until quite recently to aid the manufacture of dyes that were used in the town's textile and silk industries. South of Cheddleton, the river flows through the Churnet Valley, an area of outstanding beauty with ancient woodland, an abundance of wildlife and industrial heritage.

The Caldon Canal locks into the river at Oak Meadow Ford Lock, 2 miles on from Cheddleton and river and canal are one until Consall Forge, where the canal goes its own way again. The river continues through the valley, past ancient woodland and the Bolton Copper works at Froghall, then through the villages of Oakamoor and Alton. It flows past the JCB factory at Rocester and shortly afterwards joins the River Dove near the hamlet of Combridge.

== Churnet Valley ==
The course of the river from Cheddleton to Rocester runs through the Churnet Valley – a part of Staffordshire that has been known either as Staffordshire's Rhineland or Staffordshire's Little Switzerland. Throughout the valley there are steep gorges and banks, with an abundance of woodland and Wildlife. There are several woods owned by the National Trust and the RSPB.

== Industry ==
The Churnet has been heavily influenced by industry along its length for nearly a thousand years and as a result became possibly the most polluted river in Europe. The river was heavily used in Leek by the textile industry to make dyes. The dyeing industry was established in 1734 and it was claimed that the water from the Churnet was the finest in Europe for this purpose. In nearby Cheddleton the Churnet was used to power a flint mill that ground down flint for use in the pottery industry. Further downriver at Froghall and at Oakamoor the Thomas Bolton Copper works used the power of the Churnet to help manufacture the world's first transatlantic telegraph cables. The processes involved in manufacturing copper wire at the sites caused high levels of pollution.

The Churnet Valley was heavily involved in the iron-smelting industry and it is documented from as long ago as 1290 that iron was smelted using the river as its main source of energy. The early forges were at East Wall, near Oakamoor, but a later forge is still standing at Consall, next to the locks on the Caldon Canal.

The Caldon Canal runs with the river through the Churnet Valley and along parts the river is canalised. There was intensive freight traffic on the waterway transporting limestone and ironstone from the wharves on the canal. Today the only industrial use of the river is by the sand quarry at Oakamoor.

Since the decline of industry in Leek and the Churnet Valley, the quality of the water has improved so much that a programme of re-introducing salmon is underway.
