= Bosley (disambiguation) =

Bosley is a locale in Cheshire, England.

Bosley may also refer to:

== People and characters ==
- Bosley (surname)

=== Given named ===
- Bosley Crowther (1905–1981), U.S. journalist
- James Bosley Noel Wyatt (1847–1926), U.S. architect
- Minta Bosley Allen Trotman (1875-1949), African-American suffragist

=== Nicknamed ===
- Boz Scaggs (born 1944, nicknamed "Bosley"), U.S. musician
- Bosley (Charlie's Angels), a fictional employment title in the Charlie's Angels (franchise)

== Places ==
- Bosley (village), Cheshire, England, UK
- Bosley (civil parish), Cheshire, England, UK
- Bosley railway station, Bosley, Cheshire, England, UK
- Bosley Reservoir, Peak District, England, UK
- Bosley Lock Flight, Peak District, England, UK
- Bosley Cloud (Bosley Hill), Peak District, England, UK
- Bosley Minn (Bosley Hill), Peak District, England, UK
- Bosley, Hampshire, former village in England
- Fort Bosley, Susquehanna Valley, Pennsylvania, USA
- Bosley Butte, Klamath Mountains, Oregon, USA; a mountain
- Bosley Run, Brooke County, West Virginia, USA; a creek
- Bosley Park (Chicago), Illinois, USA

== Other uses ==
- Bosley (automobile)
- Bosley Medical Institute; a U.S. company involved in the trademark infringement case Bosley Medical Institute, Inc. v. Kremer

== See also ==
- John Bosley (disambiguation)
