= Rudyard Lake railway station =

Rudyard lake railway station may refer to either

- Cliffe Park railway station which was called Rudyard Lake from opening in 1905 until 1926.
- Rudyard railway station which was called Rudyard Lake from 1926 until closure in 1960.
