= Bosler =

Bosler may refer to:

- Bosler (surname)
- Bosler, Wyoming

== See also ==
- Boßler, a mountain in the Swabian Alps, Baden-Württemberg, Germany
