= Cliffe Park railway station =

Former railway station in Staffordshire, England

Cliffe Park
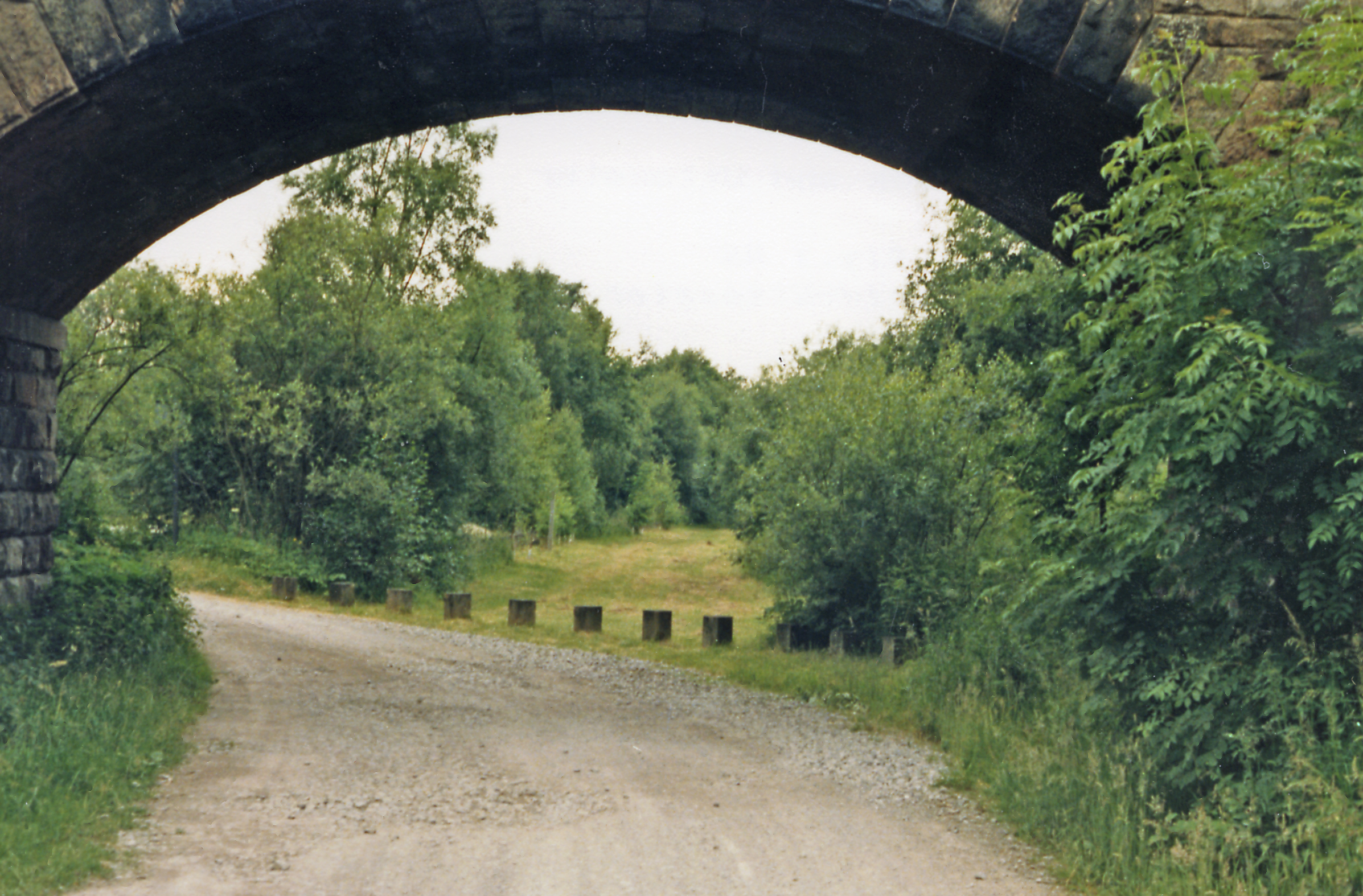
- Site of the station in 1986

General information
- Location: Rudyard, Staffordshire, Staffordshire Moorlands; England
- Coordinates: 53.1456°N 2.0900°W
- Grid reference: SJ940609
- Platforms: 2

Other information
- Status: Disused

History
- Original company: North Staffordshire Railway
- Post-grouping: London, Midland and Scottish Railway; London Midland Region of British Railways

Key dates
- 1 May 1905: Opened as Rudyard Lake
- 1 April 1926: Name changed to Cliffe Park
- 28 September 1936: Renamed Cliffe Park Halt
- 7 November 1960: Closed
Location

Cliffe Park railway station was opened by the North Staffordshire Railway (NSR) in 1905 on the Churnet Valley line to attract visitors to Rudyard Lake (actually a reservoir), which the NSR were trying to develop as a leisure and tourist attraction including a golf course. The station was originally named Rudyard Lake and was at the northern end of the lake. There were no settlements nearby and consequently the station had no goods facilities. There was one siding but this was used more for stabling excursion trains rather than freight vehicles.

In 1926 the London, Midland and Scottish Railway renamed the station Cliffe Park and at the same time Rudyard, the next station to the south, was renamed Rudyard Lake. Cliffe Park was the name of the hall that had previously been the clubhouse of the golf course and stood on the opposite side of the lake from the station.

The station remained open until passenger services were withdrawn from the northern end of the Churnet valley line (North Rode – Leek) in 1960.

== Route ==
Preceding station	Historical railways	Following station
Rushton; Line and station closed	North Staffordshire Railway; Churnet Valley Line	Rudyard; Line and station closed
