= Mount Emily =

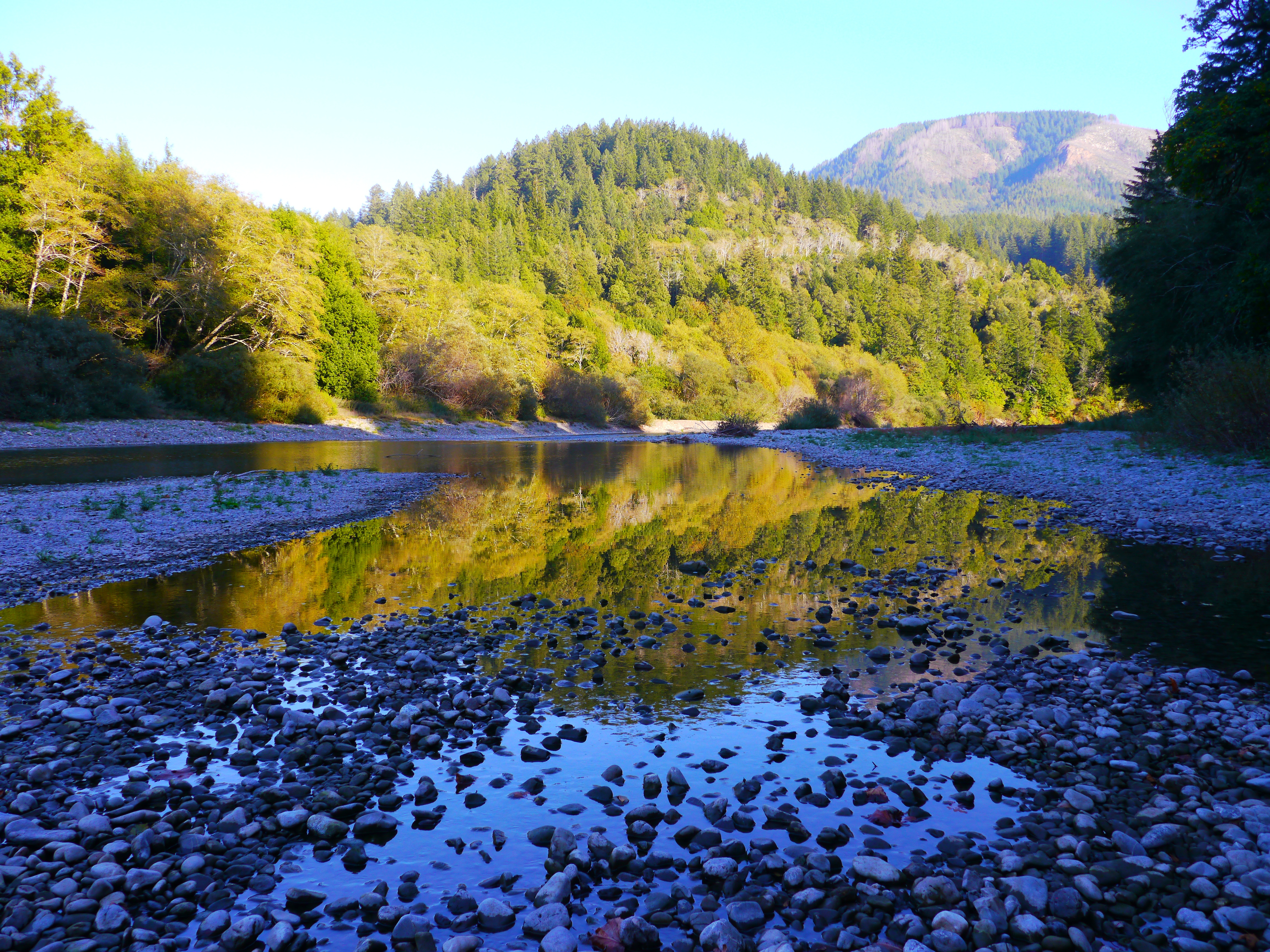
- Chetco River with Mount Emily in the background

Highest point
- Elevation: 2,925 ft (892 m)
- Prominence: 1,285 ft (392 m)
- Parent peak: Bosley Butte
- Coordinates: 42°06′09″N 124°09′10″W

Geography
- Location within Oregon
- Country: United States
- State: Oregon
- County: Curry County
- Parent range: Klamath Mountains
- Topo map: USGS Mount Emily

Mount Emily (Tolowa: en-may) is a mountain in the Klamath Mountains of southwestern Oregon in the United States. It is located in southern Curry County in the extreme southwest corner of the state, near Brookings, approximately 5 miles (8.0 km) from the Pacific Ocean and 5 miles (8.0 km) from the California state line.

== Wheeler Ridge Japanese Bombing Site ==
- Wheeler Ridge Japanese Bombing Site
- U.S. National Register of Historic Places
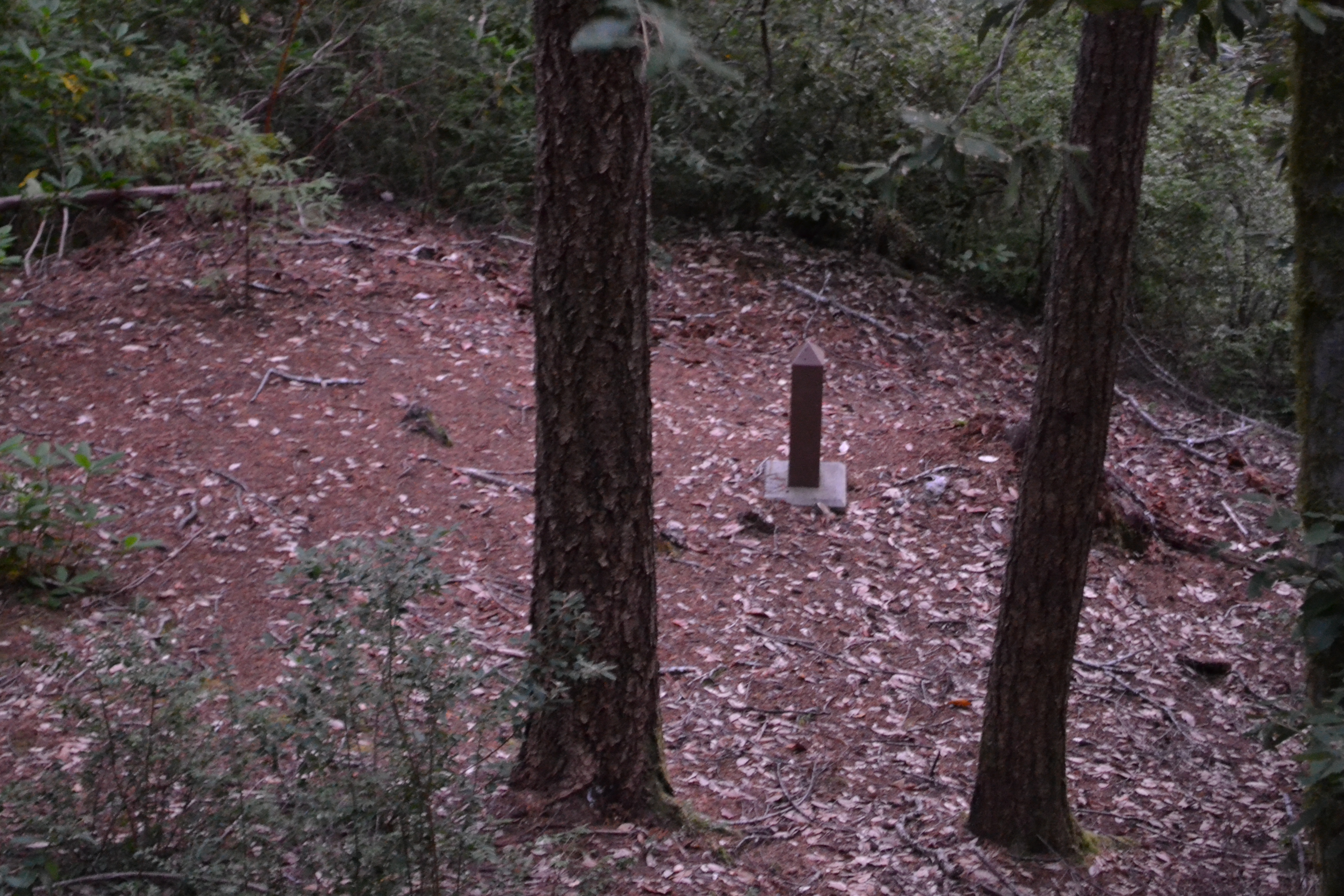

- Location within Oregon Location within the United States
- Nearest city: Brookings, Oregon
- Coordinates: 42°4′42″N 124°6′40″W
- Area: less than one acre
- NRHP reference No.: 06000589

Significant dates
- Event date: September 9, 1942
- Added to NRHP: July 6, 2006

On September 9, 1942, the Japanese submarine I-25 surfaced near Cape Blanco, Oregon, and launched a Yokosuka E14Y "Glen" seaplane piloted by Nobuo Fujita, who dropped incendiary bombs on Mount Emily in an unsuccessful attempt to start a major forest fire. This made Mount Emily the second place in the continental United States to be bombed by an enemy aircraft, with Dutch Harbor occurring three months earlier in Unalaska, Alaska. The site of the bombing was listed in the National Register of Historic Places as the Wheeler Ridge Japanese Bombing Site in July 2006.

== See also ==
- American Theater (World War II)
