= Cliffe Park Hall =

Historic site in Staffordshire, England

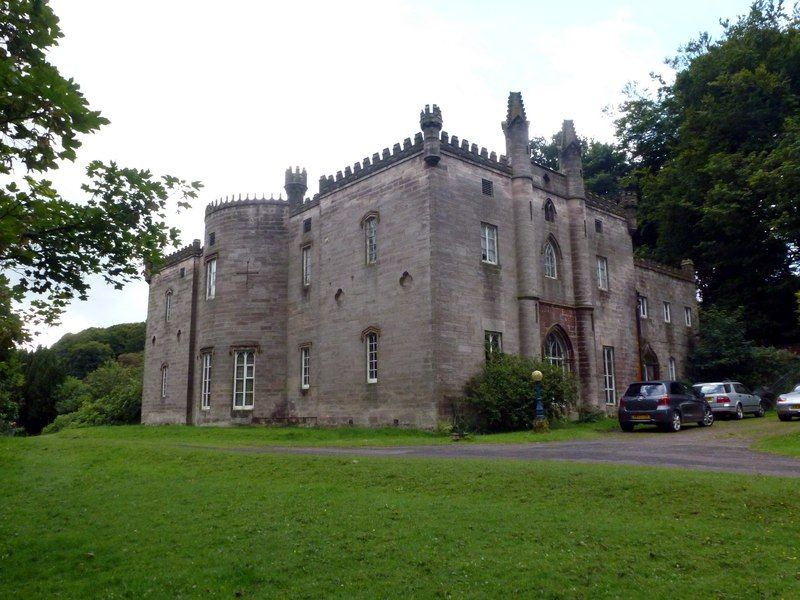

- Location within Staffordshire
- 53°8′12″N 2°5′37″W
- Location: Rudyard, Staffordshire
- OS grid reference: SJ 938 599

History
- Built: c. 1830

Listed Building – Grade II
- Designated: 1 February 1967
- Reference no.: 1037794

Cliffe Park Hall is a country house near Rudyard in Staffordshire, England. During its 200-year history, it has been a private residence, a golf club house and a youth hostel. The hall is a Grade II listed building.

== History ==
The hall was commissioned by John Haworth, owner of the Cliffe Park estate, in the early 19th century and was completed in the period 1811–1830. (Note: Sources vary about the actual date. Baggs et al quote 1818, Historic England state circa 1830 and Staffordshire Museum Services state 1811.) Howarth died in 1831 and the estate passed to Fanny Bostock, his cousin and also his lover. The hall overlooks Rudyard Lake and in 1851 Fanny commenced proceedings against the North Staffordshire Railway (NSR), owners of the lake, preventing the railway company for using the lake for any leisure activities. The proceedings took four years to conclude but eventually was found in Fanny's favour and it would be almost 50 years before leisure activities were allowed on the lake by which time the railway company would be the owners of the hall.

Fanny died in 1875 with no heirs and the estate was sold in lots by the executors in 1885; ownership of the hall passed to the Reverend E. D. Boothman who retained the hall until 1903. Boothman sold the hall to the NSR who had to seek parliamentary approval to purchase the hall, and also to use Rudyard Lake as they had wished since 1851. The act was passed in 1904 as the North Staffordshire Railway Act 1904 and the purchase of the hall confirmed. Having also purchased 67 acres of land around the hall the NSR opened a golf course in 1906 using the hall as the club house. The golf course closed in 1926 and after lying empty for some years the hall was leased, in 1933, to the Youth Hostels Association (YHA). YHA purchased the hall in 1955 but closed the hostel in 1969 and sold it in 1970 due to declining circumstances.

Brian Dalley bought the hall from YHA and lived there until his death in 2015. Shortly before his death Mr Dalley was the victim of an aggravated burglary at the hall during which he was tied up for several hours and beaten. Following Mr Dalley's death the hall has been sold again.

== Architecture ==
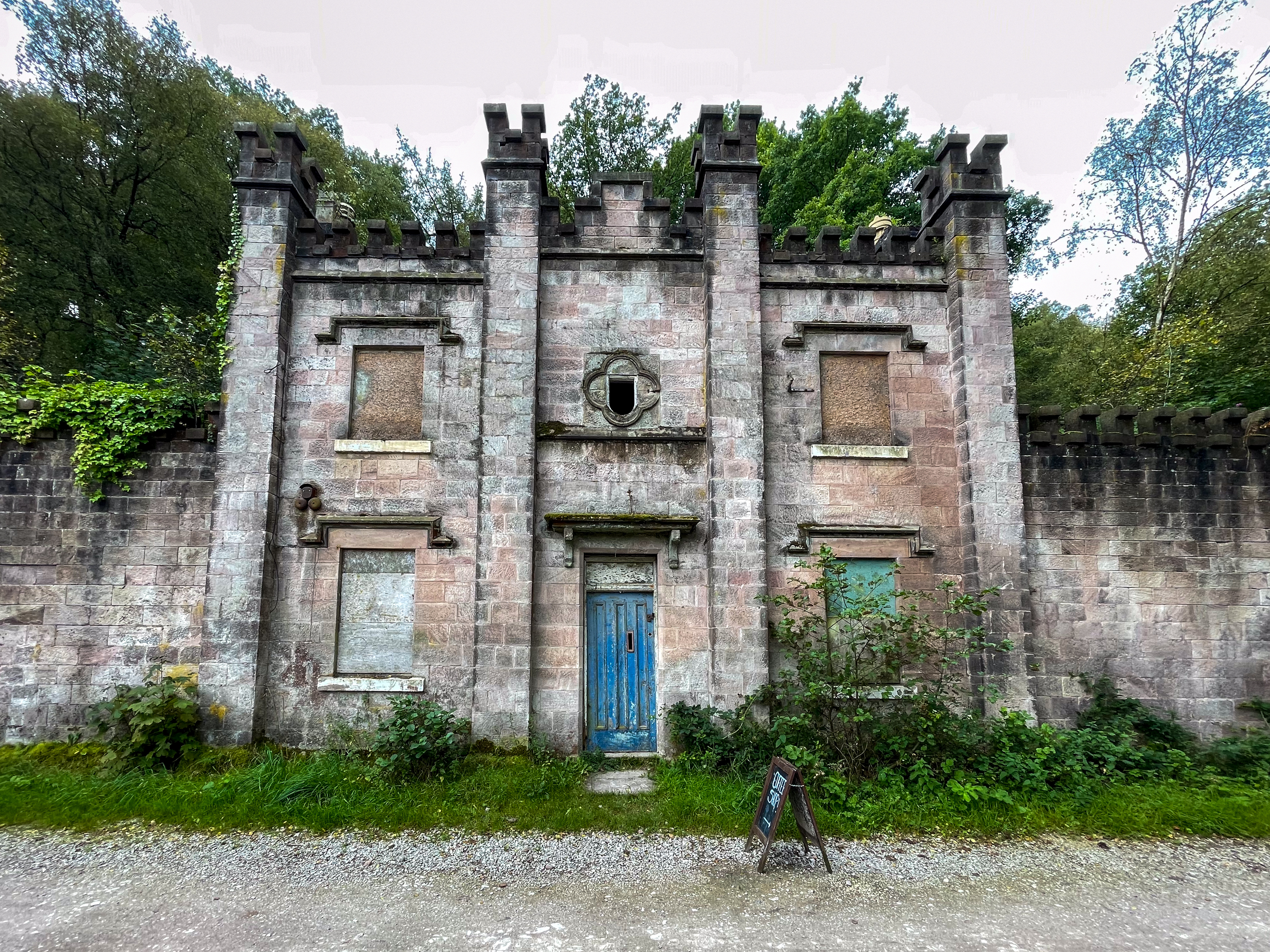
The Lodge

The hall is of stone construction and is to a Neo-Gothic design although Pevsner describes the hall (and others of a similar date) as "Gothic in intention rather than in the accuracy of features and their combination". The walls are topped with crenellations so the flat roof is not visible from the ground and the chimney stacks are disguised as turrets. The semi-circular bow in the centre of the west wall and the narrow upright windows give a castle-like effect to the whole building. The style is continued in the lodge to the hall which is also a separately listed Grade II listed building.
