= Boskey =

Boskey is a surname. Notable people with the surname include:

- Bennett Boskey (1916–2016), American lawyer
- Jayantbhai Patel Boskey, Indian politician

== See also ==
- Bosley (surname)
