= Rushton railway station =

Former railway station in Staffordshire, England

Rushton
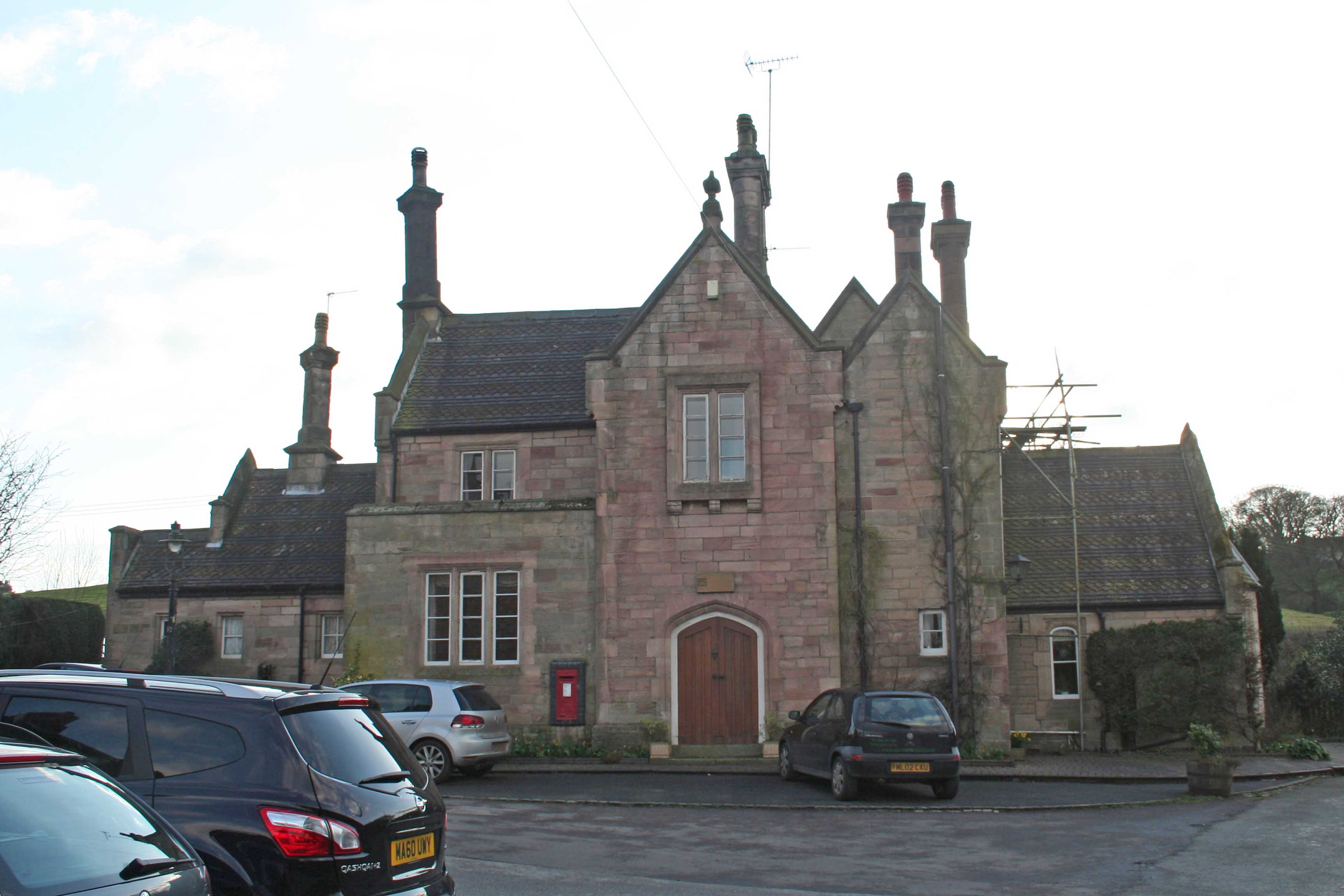
- The former station building (2012)

General information
- Location: Rushton Spencer, Staffordshire Moorlands, England
- Coordinates: 53.1593°N 2.0974°W
- Grid reference: SJ935624
- Platforms: 2

Other information
- Status: Disused

History
- Original company: North Staffordshire Railway
- Post-grouping: London, Midland and Scottish Railway; London Midland Region of British Railways

Key dates
- 1 September 1849: Opened
- 7 November 1960: Closed to passengers
- 15 June 1964: Closed to goods
Location

Rushton Spencer railway station served the village of Rushton Spencer, in Staffordshire, England, between 1849 and 1964.

== History ==
The station was opened by the North Staffordshire Railway in 1849, as part of the Churnet Valley line.

It remained open until passenger services were withdrawn from the northern end of the Churnet Valley line in 1960, between North Rode and Leek. Goods services lasted until 1964, when they too were withdrawn and the track was lifted.

Preceding station	Historical railways	Following station
Bosley; Line and station closed	North Staffordshire Railway; Churnet Valley Line	Cliffe Park; Line and station closed

== The site today ==
Ths station building is extant and is now a private residence; it was Grade II listed in 1987. The trackbed forms part of the Staffordshire Way.
