= Staffordshire Day =

- Location: Staffordshire
- Country: England
- Inaugurated: 1 May 2016
- Organizer: Staffordshire County Council
- Website: www.enjoystaffordshire.com

Staffordshire Day is celebrated on 1 May to promote the historic county of Staffordshire. The initiative was launched in 2015 by South Staffordshire MP, Gavin Williamson. Williamson gave the rationale for the celebration: "I’ve seen other great counties pay tribute to their history and traditions and I think it’s only right that we honour the wonderful County of Staffordshire. There is so much to celebrate from history, food, tradition and people that hail from this extraordinary area".

2016 was chosen for the first celebration as it marks the 1,000th anniversary of the first mention of the county of Staffordshire.

Williamson proposed that Staffordshire Day be held on 18 September, the birthday of Samuel Johnson (born in Lichfield). Staffordshire County Council took the idea on board and held a poll to decide the date. The candidate dates were:

- 1 May – the anniversary of the founding of Josiah Wedgwood & Sons
- 5 July – the anniversary of the discovery of the Staffordshire Hoard
- 6 September – to commemorate Charles II hiding in a South Staffordshire oak tree after the Battle of Worcester
- 18 September – the birthday of Samuel Johnson
- 27 September – the anniversary of the death of James Brindley

The poll was held in July 2015 and the chosen date was 1 May receiving 36% of the votes cast.

== Staffordshire Day 2016 ==
Over 50 events were held across the county on Sunday 1 May. Locations included Lichfield Cathedral, Alton Towers, and Rudyard Lake.
