= John Bosley =

John Bosley may refer to:

- John Bosley (politician) (1947–2022), Canadian politician
- John Bosley (Charlie's Angels), a fictional detective of Charlie's Angels
- John Bosley (author) (1961 - to date), Book ‘Snails around France’ September 2024

== See also ==
- John Bosley Ziegler (c.1920–1983), American physician
