= Boßler Tunnel =

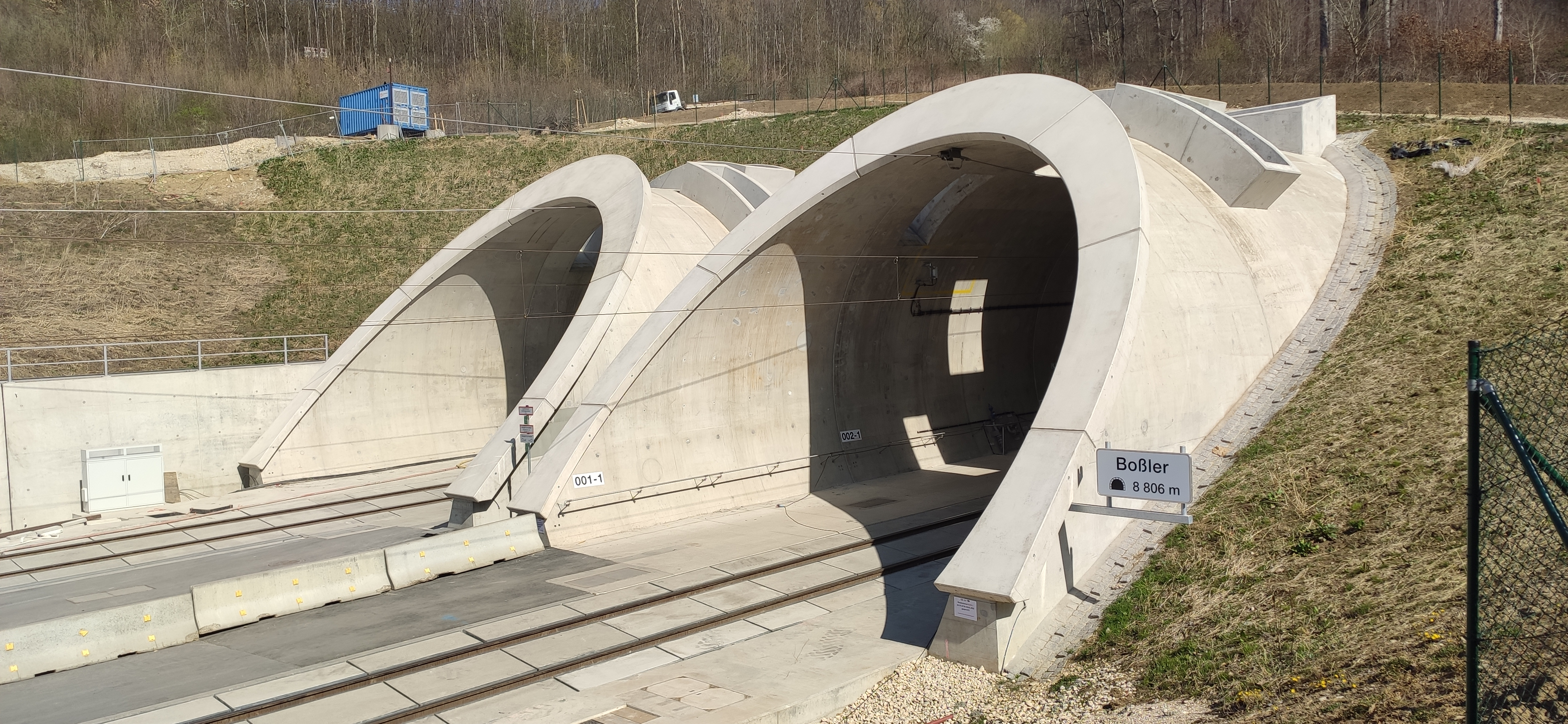
- Boßler Tunnel - western portal
- Interactive map of Boßler Tunnel

Overview
- Official name: Boßlertunnel
- Line: Wendlingen–Ulm high-speed railway
- Coordinates: 48.6305°N 9.5640°E (west portal); 48.5724°N 9.6449°E (east portal)
- Crosses: Boßler mountain Roter-Wasen nature reserve

Operation
- Work began: 2013
- Constructed: 8 June 2018 (tunnelling)
- Opened: 11 December 2022
- Owner: Deutsche Bahn
- Traffic: High speed passenger trains

Technical
- Length: 8,806 m (28,891 ft)
- No. of tracks: 2 single track tunnels
- Track gauge: 1,435 mm (4 ft 8 1/2 in) standard gauge
- Electrified: 15 kV 16.7 Hz AC overhead line
- Operating speed: 250 km/h
- Grade: 2.5% (1 in 40)
- Cross passages: 17

The Boßler Tunnel is a 8,806 m-long (28,891 ft) railway tunnel on the Wendlingen–Ulm high-speed railway. It is built as two parallel single-track tunnels between the 45.367 and 54.175 km (28.190 and 33.663 mi) mark. The tunnel runs between Aichelberg and Mühlhausen im Täle under the Roter Wasen and the Boßler mountain. It is one of a series of tunnels underneath the Swabian Jura range. It is the longest tunnel on the line and the fifth longest tunnel in Germany (after the Landrücken Tunnel, the Münden Tunnel, the Filder Tunnel and the Katzenberg Tunnel).

== Route ==
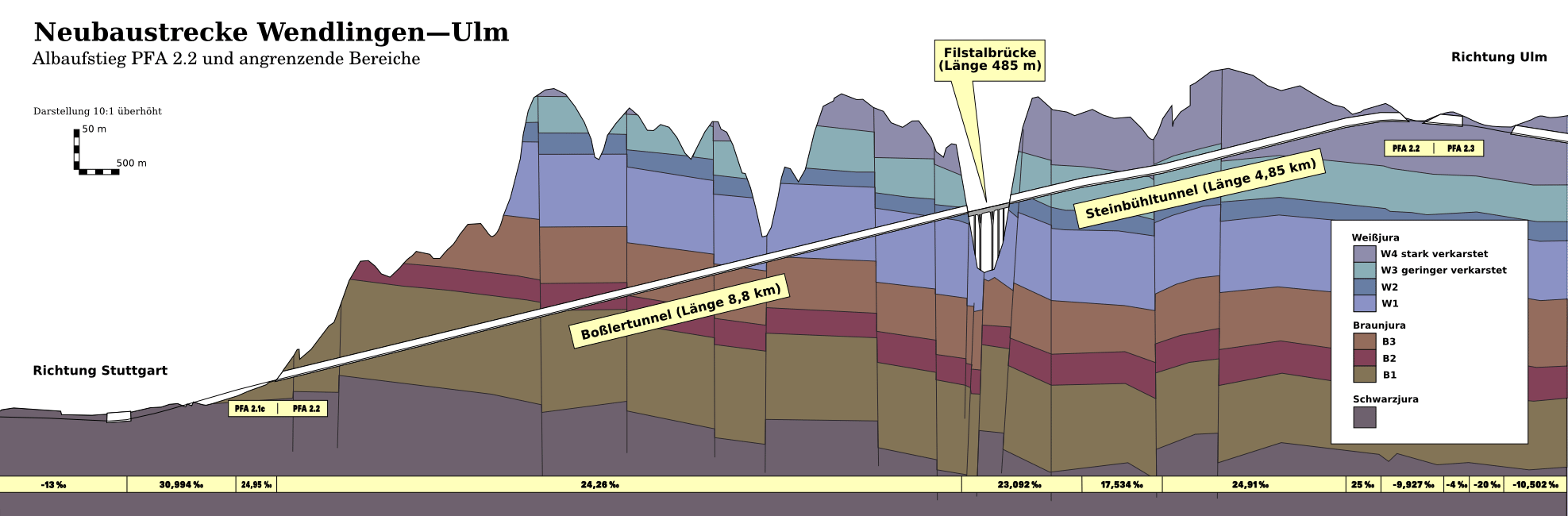
Geological cross-section of the Boßler tunnel and neighbouring tunnels

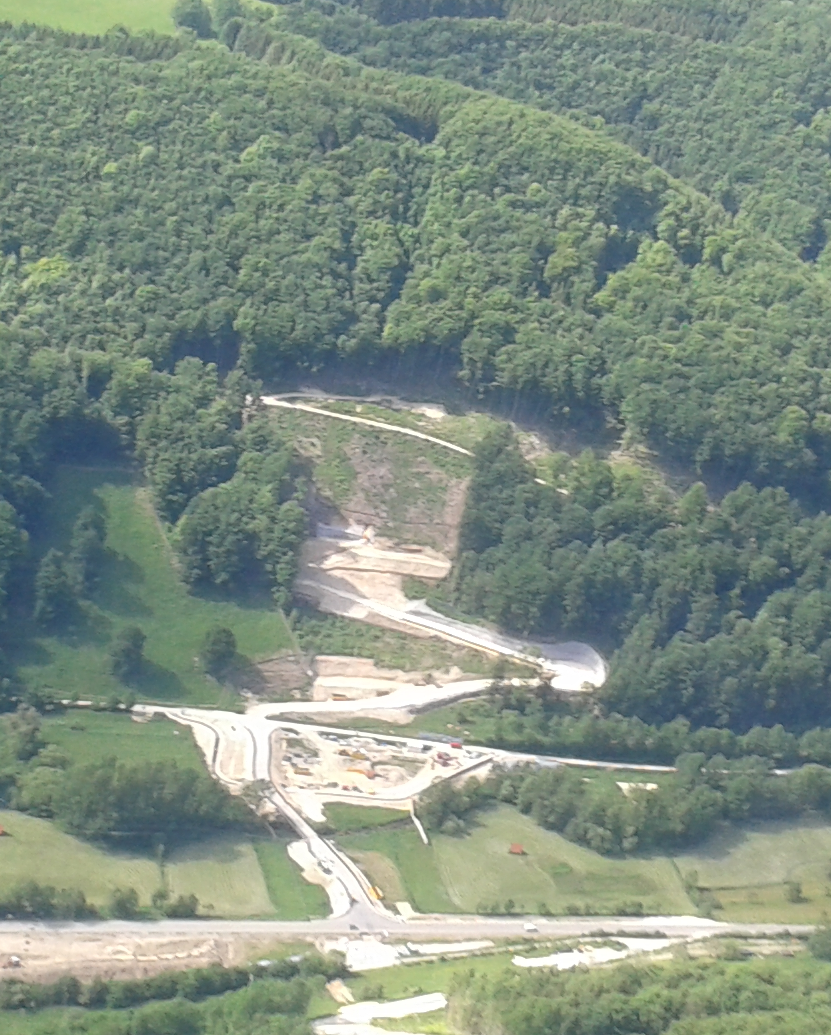
South-east portal under construction near Mühlhausen

The western portal (portal Aichelberg, 48.6305°N 9.5640°E), situated northeast of Weilheim an der Teck, is the border of one of the line's planning sections. The line approaches this portal from the west, parallel to the A8 motorway.

The tunnel runs in a straight line towards the southeast, passing under the Roter Wasen and the Boßler. The tunnel climbs about 213 metres (699 ft) to the southeast portal, with a gradient of about 25% (1 in 40). The maximum overburden depth is 280 metres (920 ft).

The eastern portal (portal Buch im Filstal, 48.5724°N 9.6449°E) is situated between Mühlhausen im Täle and Wiesensteig. The line exits the portal onto the 485-metre (1,591.2 ft) Fils Viaduct across the A8.

== History ==
=== Deciding between alternative routes ===
The tunnel is part of the Albaufstieg section of the line (track section 2.2), which involves an ascent of the Swabian Jura (also known in German as the Alb). 25 alternative routes were initially considered for this section. A plan drawn up in 1993 included an 8-kilometre (5.0-mile) tunnel. A later, 1995 plan included an 8,710-metre (28,580 ft) tunnel. Many alternative routes were considered for the Aichelberg to Widderstall corridor. As well as routes involving a combined rail and motorway tunnel and a direct route, local variations of the route in the Neidlingen, Wiesensteig and Westerheim districts were also considered.

The spatial planning provisions required to consider possible alternative routes for the Albaufstieg. Eight different routes were examined in detail. In 1999 a hydrological evaluation of these variants was conducted. After a planning stop in 2000, a new integrated assessment was carried out in 2006 in the context of paths for combined traffic routes. In the middle of 1991 an early road design proposed the beginning of the tunnel already in Weilheim an der Teck. while a length of 9 km was allotted for this part of Albaufstieg. According to the planning status of 1993, an 8.8 km-long (5.5 mi) tunnel was provided in this area.

As of 2004 and 2007, the planned length was 8,710 m (28,580 ft). Plans of 2007 envisaged the building of an exploratory tunnel within the cross-section of the later final tunnel due to the prevalent geological conditions.

In mid-August 2009, the consultation process for the 14.5 km-long (9.0 mi) zoning section Albaufstieg to which the tunnel belongs, was completed by the regional council of Stuttgart and handed over to the Federal Railway Authority for final approval. In the process leading to approval, 82 public agencies were consulted, and 1150 private reservations were handled. The principal resulting changes affected the site logistics. In mid-2009, construction work was scheduled to start in 2010.

=== Dispute on use of tunnel boring machines ===
Due to the unstable rock, planning decisions initially ruled out the use of tunnel boring machines. However, according to entrepreneur Martin Herrenknecht their use could save 70 to 100 million euros over the originally tendered conventional method The company obtained expert opinion at their own cost, and thus achieved the approval of mechanical tunneling. Together with the excavation of Filder tunnel, 80 to 100 million euros could thus been saved. A 2,830 m-long (9,280 ft) section was advanced using tunnel boring machines (TBM) in both tubes. Although Deutsche Bahn had stipulated conventional shotcrete tunneling in the tender documents, alternative proposals for TBM excavation were welcomed. This proved an economic solution.

=== Award of contract ===
On 8 November 2011, the tunnel shell of Boßler- and Steinbühltunnel was put out for tender in Europe. The Boßlertunnel construction was subdivided into two lots of approximately 3,670 m (12,040 ft) and approximately 5,100 m (16,700 ft) in length; the Steinbühltunnel forms a third, independent lot. The contract also involved around 1.32 million cubic meters of excavated material or to be used during the project or disposed of, and the construction of four temporary connection points on the Autobahn 8

The calculation documents were sent to bidders in February 2012. The contract was awarded in October 2012, together with the Steinbühltunnel construct. The cost for both tunnels came to 635 million euros, believed to be significantly below the planned cost Originally, the award was not expected to be made until the end of 2010 (Status: December 2011). The award was officially published at the end of November 2012.[26] The total cost for both the tunnel Albaufstiegs specified end of October 2013, about 1.05 billion euros. For the full planning approval section 2.4, the price was estimated at EUR 1,074.3 million. When the financing agreement for the new line was concluded in April 2009, the Boßler Tunnel was estimated to have shell costs of around EUR 19.5 million per kilometer and tube. When applying for the financial construction permit in 2010, the planned cost was EUR 32.0 million per kilometer and tube.

=== Construction ===
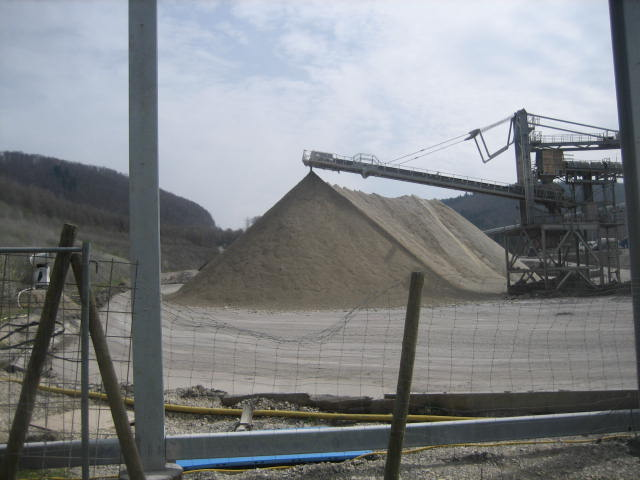
Building site April 2016

The clearing work for the construction side began in early December 2012. In 2013, an embankment was added between the existing bridge over the L1214 road and the future tunnel portal. The bridge was completed the first building of the new line in 2011 In early 2012, following the site survey the advance was scheduled for mid-2013 The excavation at 'intermediate attack Umpfental' 'began in July 2013. 66 months are provided for the shell. The two tubes should be first built using the NATM. To accelerate the construction, three intermediate points were provided. As part of a plan amendment process in 2008 an intermediate advance was rejected. The planning of 2009 envisaged another intermediate advance in the form of a preliminary window tunnel, to be filled in after completion of the tunneling. The machine advance from the western portal was over a length of 2,830 m (9,280 ft). An advance from the eastern portal was not undertaken, due to the very steep flanks and environmental considerations. By mid-November 2014, 600 meters of intermediate advance had been completed.

Of the 8,772 m-long (28,780 ft) west tube, 8,745 m (28,691 ft) are being advanced in traditional drill and blast methods; portal structures are planned for the remaining 27 m (89 ft). Of the 8,788 m-long (28,832 ft) east tunnel, 8,761 m (28,743 ft) are being advanced using traditional drill and blast methods and 27 m (89 ft) using cut and cover for the portals. Together with the Steinbühltunnel, a total of 4.3 million cubic meters of material will be excavated. The machine advance should, according to the planning status of the end of 2013, begin not later than 21 September 2014.[well, did it?]

Approximately 8,000 people attended a Construction Site Open Day on 8 November 2014. Machine advance began symbolically. The actual machine advance was scheduled to begin in January 2015.

After the overburden proved more solid than initially planned, in 2014, an extended machine advance was considered. Could machine advance be used? Spätestens am 8. Dezember 2014 wurde der konventionelle Vortrieb ohne Angabe von Gründen gestoppt. Dabei waren bergabwärts 731 m (2,398 ft) und bergaufwärts bei 47 m (154 ft). It was downhill 731 m (2,398 ft) and uphill at 47 m (154 ft) The according to other sources for before Christmas in 2014 announced propelling start was delayed, according to web information indefinitely due to necessary fine adjustments to the machine.

At the end of February 2015, the Federal Railway announced its intention to extend the machine advance In early March 2015, talks were held between German railway and contractors on the extension of mechanical tunneling Due in part to lack of permits, the start of driving was delayed four months in total

The machine advance finally began on 14 April 2015. The 120-meter-long (390 ft), 11.38 m-diameter (37.3 ft) machine, worth 29 million euros, is called S 833 and was given the name Kätchen. It was planned advance by 15 to 20 meters per day. The machine advance would take eight to nine months in the first tunnel tube. After one kilometer of machines advance, very dry rock dust was unexpectedly encountered. Instead of the planned 20 meters per day, the machine advanced achieved as much as 30 meters (98 ft). In July and August 2015, the advance was paused for five weeks in order to convert the logistics for a higher driving speed. On 5 August 2015 the advance was resumed early September 2015 were with the machine 1.6 propelled km

The segments for the outer skin of the tunnel were made in a segment plant in Weilheim, seven days a week, in two shifts per day with 100 workers each. They are transported the 1.6 km to the tunnel portal with a Feldbahn.

On 6 November 2016 the machine finished the first tunnel. The structural work was done from 2013–2018.

== Geology ==
For about six kilometres, the tunnel passes beneath Middle Jurassic layers. Preliminary investigations had shown very low strength in some sections, thus unstable rock is expected in connection with a maximum overburden of 280 m (920 ft), and a minimum of 23 m (75 ft). Furthermore, Karst formations are expected in the White Jurassic layers. The Middle Jurassic layers consist of claystone and argillaceous marl with sandstone inclusions. From top to bottom, the layers α, β (unstable rock), and γ - ξ are traversed, followed by White Jurassic α, β, and γ. The water pressure in the Middle Jurassic layers is expected to reach 4 bar (400 kPa), in the White Jurassic up to 10 bar (1,000 kPa).

== Specifications ==
The tunnel has a rescue area at its western portal with an area of 1,500 m^{2} (16,000 sq ft). The tunnel has LED safety lights integrated into the handrails which can be activated by train crew, using a button in the tunnel. It is electrified using Re 330 type catenary, and is equipped with ETCS level 2 baseline 3 signalling as with the rest of the line. The two single-track tubes are connected by 17 cross passages, spaced at a maximum of 500 m (1,600 ft) from each other, and have fire-retarding, smoke-proof, self-closing doors with panic locks. The Rheda 2000 slab track used has a driveable surface for emergency vehicles.

The tunnel has a right-handed curve, with a radius of 2,305 m (7,562 ft) at the Aichelberg portal and afterwards passes into a straight.
