= Bosley Lock Flight =

Coordinates: 53.1917°N 2.1439°W

Bosley Locks
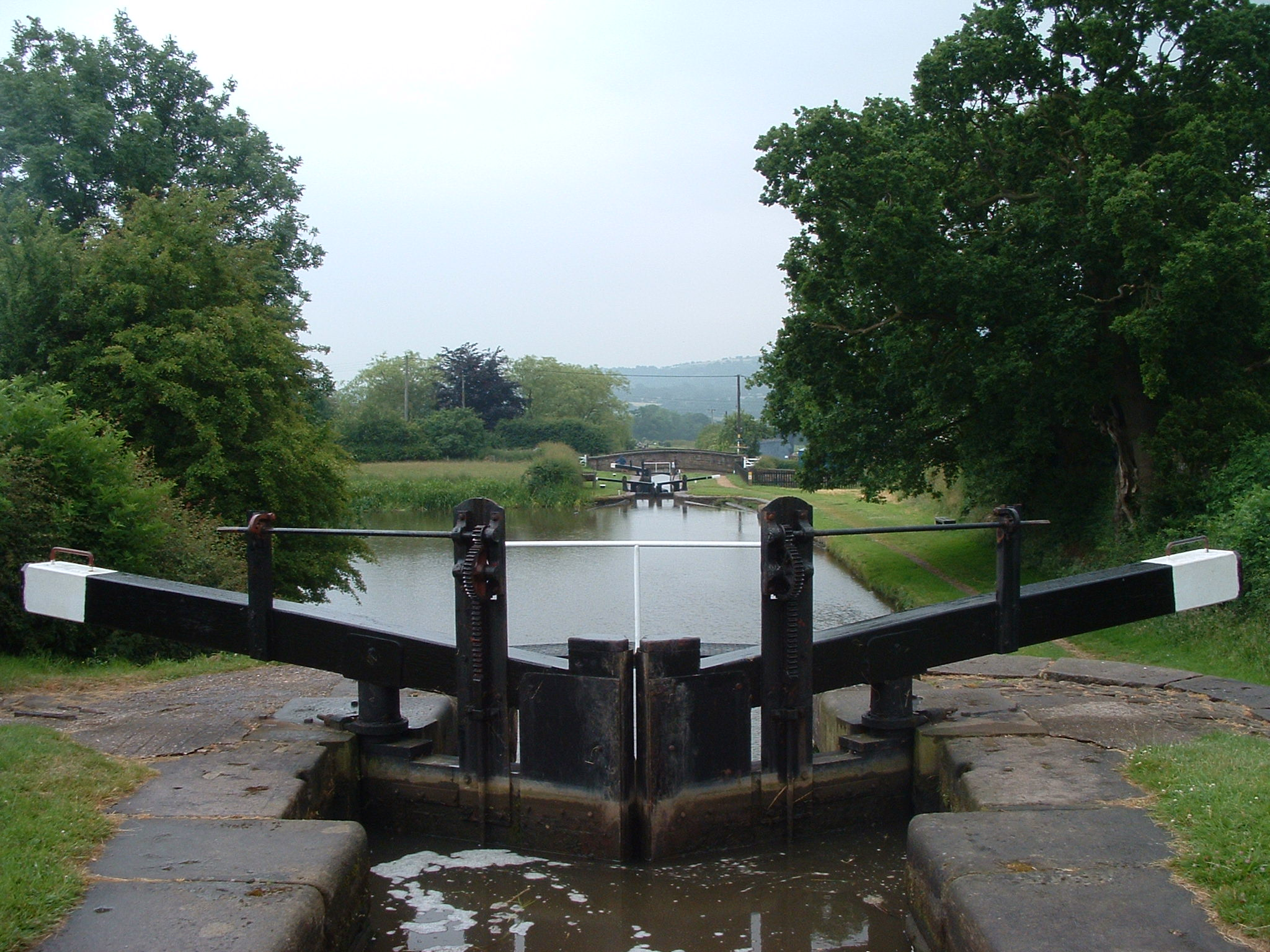
- Bosley lock 4, with the top mitre gates of lock 5 in the distance.
- Interactive map of Bosley Locks
- Waterway: Macclesfield Canal
- County: Cheshire
- Maintained by: Canal & River Trust
- Operation: Manual
- First built: 1831
- Length: 70 feet (21.3 m)
- Width: 7 feet (2.1 m)
- Fall: 118 feet (36 m)
- Above sea level: top lock: 518 feet (158 m)
- Flight of 12 locks

Bosley Lock Flight (grid reference SJ904662) is a flight of twelve canal locks, situated on the Macclesfield Canal at Bosley, near Macclesfield, Cheshire, England. The locks are substantially built with stone blocks, and unusually for narrow locks have mitre gates at both ends. They were each built with a side pond, which enabled some of the water to be re-used during a filling and emptying cycle. The side ponds have been disused for many years, but there are plans to reinstate one of them for demonstration purposes.

== History ==
The Macclesfield Canal was authorised by an Act of Parliament obtained in April 1826, after the civil engineer Thomas Telford had produced two reports and estimated that the canal could be built for £295,000. He also selected which of the contractors who tendered for the job should be awarded the contract, but his involvement then ceased, and the construction was supervised by William Crosley, the resident engineer. The quality of the workmanship was excellent, and by the time the canal opened on 9 November 1831, the total cost was only slightly more than the estimate, at £320,000. Like many of Telford's designs, it used cuttings and embankments to maintain as straight and level a course as possible, and this enabled all the locks to be built as a single flight, although there was also a stop lock where the canal joined the Hall Green Branch of the Trent and Mersey Canal at Hall Green. The contractors who built the locks were called Nowell and Sons.

When the canal was opened, there was also a stop lock at Marple Junction where it joined the Peak Forest Canal, but this stop lock has long since been de-gated, and only a narrow section with remains of the A-frames betrays its former existence.

When built, the flight was designed to be operated by two lock keepers. One had a cottage at the top of the flight near lock 1, and the other near lock 11. The top cottage is still there, but the bottom one has been demolished. The locks are built out of large stone blocks, and these were quarried near the bottom of the flight. Although there is no trace of it now, it is thought that a tramway brought the blocks from the quarry to the locks. In the 1950s, a reservoir was built in the disused quarry.

== Route ==
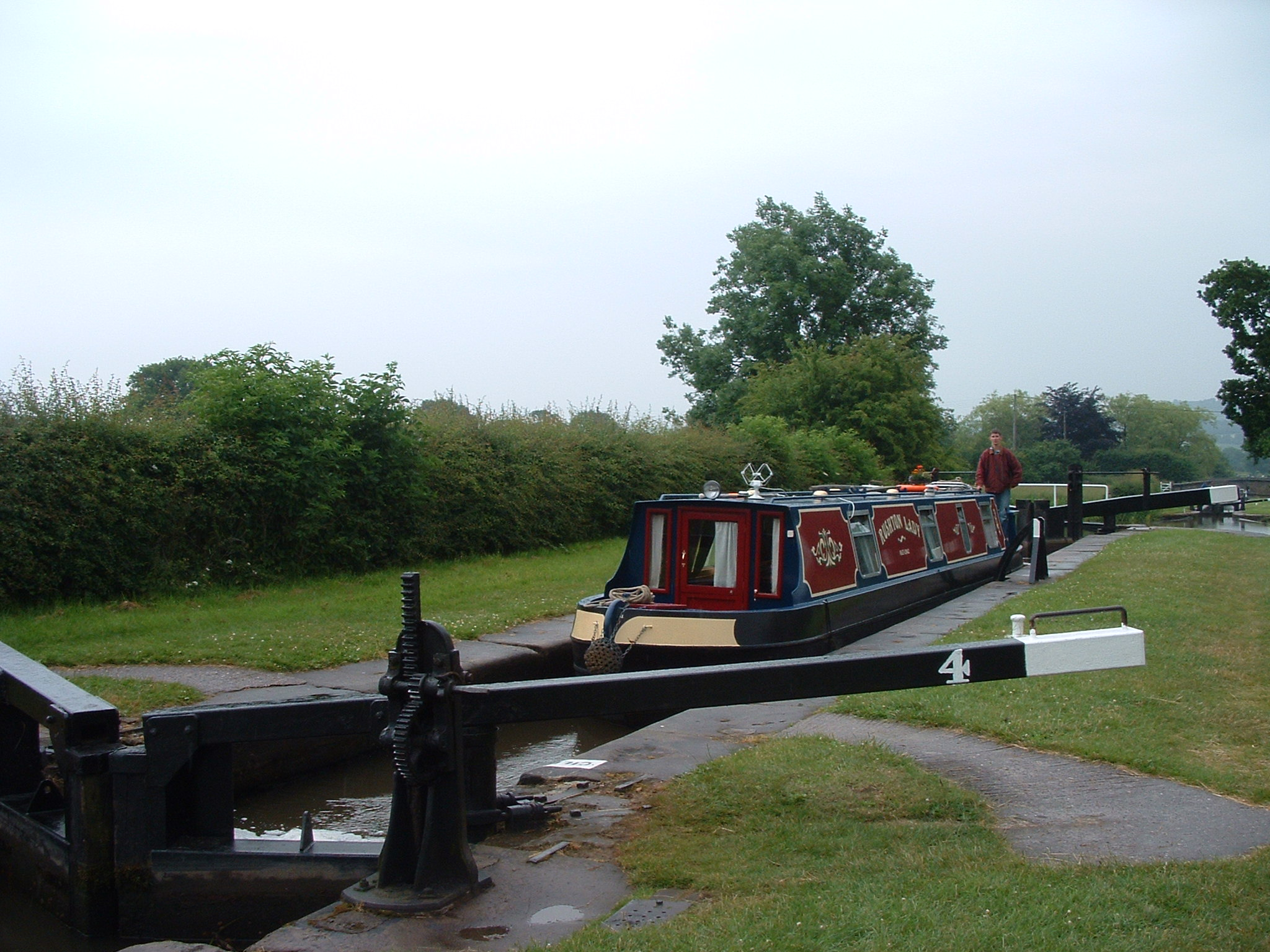
A hire boat in lock 4. The frame for the side pond paddles can be seen near the back of the boat.

From Buglawton, on the northern edge of Congleton, the canal runs along the south bank of the River Dane for 2 miles (3.2 km), before crossing the river on an aqueduct, and then climbing up the side of the valley. The twelve locks are spread over a distance of just 1 mile (1.6 km), and raise the level of the canal by 118 feet (36 m) to the 518-foot (158 m) contour, which it then follows to Marple Junction. The locks are numbered 1 to 12 from the top downwards. A minor road crosses at Daintrys Road Bridge, just below lock 1, the A54 road crosses at Peckerpool Bridge, below lock 5, Swindalls Bridge carries a footpath over the canal below lock 8, and a dismantled railway used to cross above lock 12. The surroundings are rural and partially wooded. There are some secluded moorings by the locks, which are suitable for standard narrow boats, up to a maximum size of 70 by 7 feet (21.3 by 2.1 m).

The railway bridge once carried the Churnet Valley Line which left the main line from Stoke to Manchester at North Rode, just to the west of lock 2. Bosley railway station was located by lock 5, and the railway passed through Leek to reach Uttoxeter. Part of it is now preserved as the Churnet Valley Railway.

Because of the short distances between the locks, most of the intervening pounds are extended sideways, in order to increase their volume, and lessen the changes in level when a lock full of water is emptied into the pound by a boat descending the flight or removed from the pound to fill the lock below as a boat ascends. The locks are built of rusticated red gritstone, and most are grade II listed structures. The listing includes the ponds to the west of each of the locks. Daintrys Road Bridge has an elliptical arch, and is built of reddish-buff ashlar gritstone, as is Peckerpool Wood Bridge. Both date from the opening of the canal. Swindalls Bridge is a farm accommodation bridge, and is also built of gritstone blocks. The aqueduct that carries the canal over the River Dane below lock 12 is 45 feet (14 m) high and has a semi-circular arch with a span of 35 feet (11 m). Bosley Reservoir, the main source of water for the canal, is situated about 1 mile (1.6 km) to the east of the flight, and a feeder supplies water to the summit pound just above the top lock.

== Features ==
How a lock with a side pond works

The locks are unusual for narrow canals, in that they are fitted with mitre gates at both top and bottom, as opposed to the more usual clapper top gate. The chambers are constructed from large blocks of stone, with mason's marks visible on many of them. The locks were equipped with side ponds to save water, but these were taken out of use many years ago, although they still function as overflow channels. The frames for the paddle gear are still visible at four of them.

Lock ponds are ponds which are maintained at an intermediate level between the upper pound and the lower pound. When a lock is emptying, water from the top of the lock fills the pond, and the rest is discharged to the lower pound. When the lock is filling, water from the pond fills the bottom of the lock, and the rest is then drawn from the top pound. By careful design of the size and level of the ponds, those at Bosley managed to re-use about 40 per cent of the water in this way. The bottom of each lock was connected by a culvert to the bottom of its pond, and a paddle controlled the flow of water through the culvert. The paddle had to be capable of sealing the culvert against flow in either direction, since when closed it had to prevent the lock from emptying when it is full, and from filling when it is empty.

British Waterways, in conjunction with the Macclesfield Canal Society, are hoping to restore one of the side ponds to enable its operation to be demonstrated, although it is likely that it will only be used for demonstrations, rather than in normal operation of the lock. In 2008 the side pond adjacent to lock 4 was cleared and investigated. Although the paddle gear was beyond repair, enough of it was left to see that it included a counterbalance mechanism, and the stonework of the pond was still in good condition. The culverts are currently bricked up, and the brickwork will have to be removed if the side pond is returned to service.

Each of the locks has a stone overflow weir on its towpath side, just above the top gates. A stone culvert runs under the towpath to feed the water into the side pond, which also has an overflow weir at its lower end. Another culvert feeds excess water back into the canal below the bottom gates of the lock.

== See also ==
- Canals of the United Kingdom
- History of the British canal system

== Bibliography ==
- Cumberlidge, Jane (2009). Inland Waterways of Great Britain (8th Ed.). Imray Laurie Norie and Wilson. ISBN 978-1-84623-010-3.
- Gilman, Harold (1992). The Macclesfield Canal. M G Publications. ISBN 978-0-9518608-0-9.
- Hadfield, Charles (1985). The Canals of the West Midlands. David and Charles. ISBN 978-0-7153-8644-6.
- Nicholson (2006). Nicholson Waterways Guide (Vol 5): North West and the Pennines. Harper Collins. ISBN 978-0-00-721113-5.
- Oxenham; Tunnicliffe (1978). A lake in the hills. Cheshire Conservation Trust. Archived from the original on 12 July 2013.
