= Bosley =

Village in Cheshire, England

Coordinates: 53.186°N 2.124°W

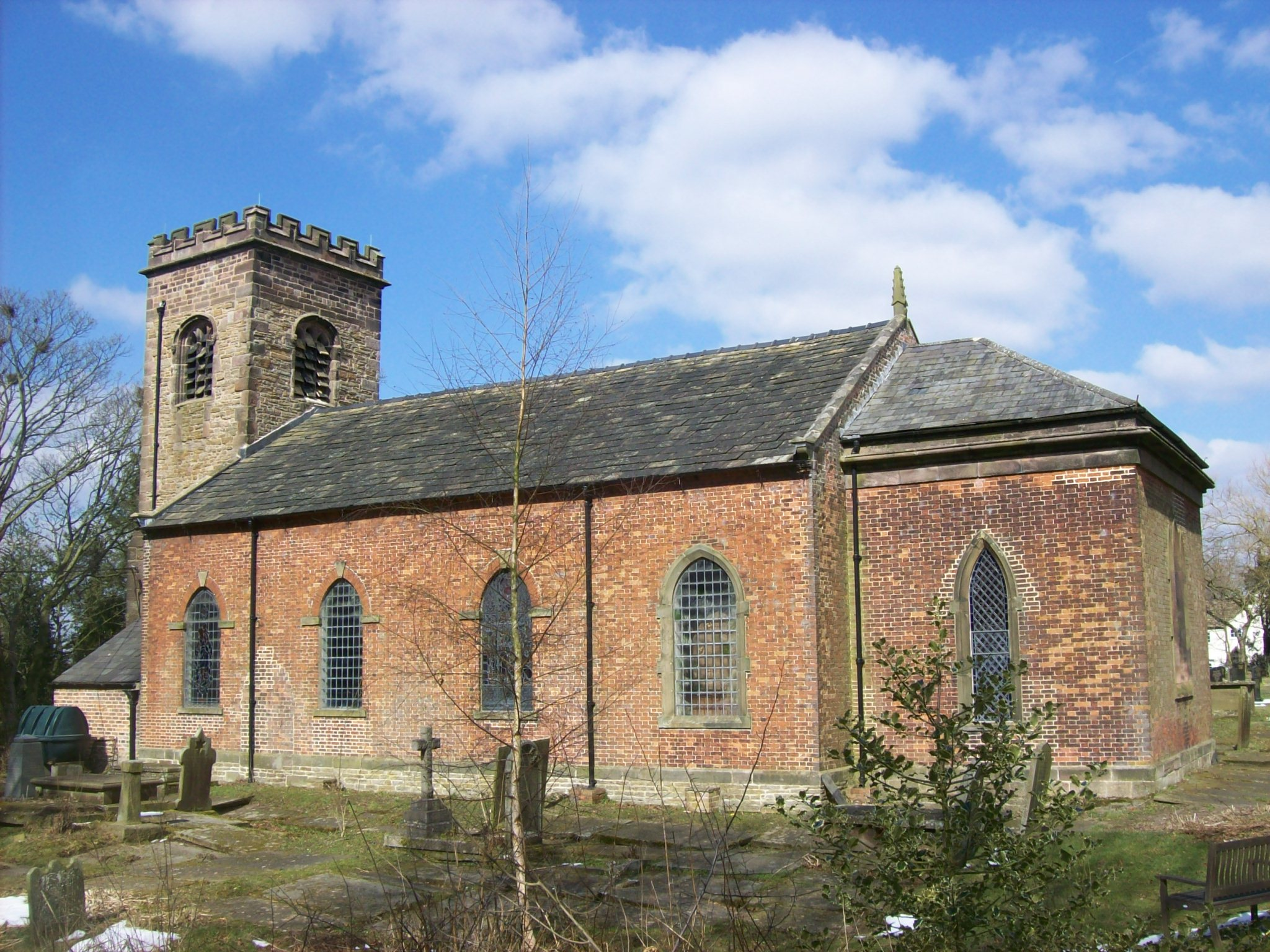
- St. Mary the Virgin Church, Bosley

- Location within Cheshire
- Population: 406
- OS grid reference: SJ917655
- Civil parish: Bosley
- Unitary authority: Cheshire East
- Ceremonial county: Cheshire
- Region: North West
- Country: England
- Sovereign state: United Kingdom
- Post town: MACCLESFIELD
- Postcode district: SK11
- Dialling code: 01260
- Police: Cheshire
- Fire: Cheshire
- Ambulance: North West
- UK Parliament: Macclesfield

Bosley is a village and civil parish in Cheshire, England. At the 2001 census, it had a population of 406. The village is on the A523 road near to where it intersects the A54, about six miles south of Macclesfield. It is the site of Bosley Reservoir. The Macclesfield Canal runs through the parish. All its locks are in this section, including the noted Bosley Lock Flight.

The village is immediately to the north of the Staffordshire border, close to the Peak District National Park.

Arthur Herbert Procter, Victoria Cross recipient, was parish vicar of Bosley from 1931 to 1933.

The village's tug of war team, formed in 1947, were world champions in 1975 and 1976.

== July 2015 explosions ==
Wood Treatment Ltd were manufacturers of a variety of wood fibre and wood powder products. At 9:10 am on Friday 17 July 2015, a number of people were injured, four killed or missing, and the mill destroyed, by at least three explosions at the Wood Treatment site. The local Member of Parliament (MP), David Rutley, spent time at the site. He said it was "like a war zone" and described the day as his "darkest day" so far in his time as MP. The following Sunday the Methodist minister (Rev. Pam Butler) and Vicar (Rev. John Harries) held a joint service of remembrance. It was in the Anglican church because the Methodist church was inside the cordon set up to protect the site. On the Friday they had both expressed publicly the trauma and anger felt by the whole village. A fund for the victims was set up by a local councillor. By 23 July, three of the four bodies had been recovered, and the fire chief was “very confident” that they knew the location of the last one. Fires were still burning and very little of the structure was identifiable. Paul Hitchen, of the Urban Search and Rescue team, said, "The scale of the incident...is unprecedented in this country in the last 10 years." Firefighters finally left the scene over a month after the tragedy. Even then the Urban Search and Rescue Team from Merseyside Fire and Rescue Service remained to continue looking for the body of the one person who was, officially, still only missing.

After an extensive investigation by Cheshire Constabulary and the national Health and Safety Executive, Wood Treatment Ltd was charged with corporate manslaughter in November 2019. The company's managing director was charged with manslaughter owing to negligence and two other managers with breaches in health and safety laws; their trial commenced in December 2019. Following a 12-week trial, both the firm and its managing director were acquitted of manslaughter but convicted of lesser health and safety offences.

The works had a long history. Two water-mills were built on the River Dane around 1760 by Charles Roe to process copper and brass. They were called "Higherworks Mill" and "Lowerworks Mill". Later, both mills were converted to process silk and cotton and later still to grind corn. They closed in the 1920s but reopened in the 1930s for their final task of grinding wood into a fine flour to make Linoleum, Bakelite and explosives.

== See also ==
- Listed buildings in Bosley
- Church of St Mary the Virgin, Bosley
- Bosley Cloud
- Bosley railway station
- Bosley Minn
- Bosley Reservoir
- Bosley Lock Flight
