= Ergogenic use of anabolic steroids =

Steroid use

Since their discovery, anabolic steroids (AAS) have been widely used as performance-enhancing drugs to improve performance in sports, to improve one's physical appearance, as self-medication to recover from injury, and as an anti-aging aid. Use of anabolic steroids for purposes other than treating medical conditions is controversial and, in some cases, illegal. Major sports organizations have moved to ban the use of anabolic steroids. There is a wide range of health concerns for users. Legislation in many countries restricts and criminalizes AAS possession and trade.

== History ==
Performance-enhancing substances have been used for thousands of years in traditional medicine by societies around the world, with the aim of promoting vitality and strength. The use of gonadal hormones pre-dates their identification and isolation. Medical use of testicle extract began in the late 19th century, while its effects on strength were still being studied. In 1889, the 72-year-old Mauritian neurologist Charles-Édouard Brown-Séquard injected himself with an extract of dog and guinea pig testicles, and reported at a scientific meeting that these injections had led to a variety of beneficial effects. However, almost all experts, including some of Brown-Sequard's contemporaries, had agreed that these positive effects were induced by Brown-Séquard himself. In 2002, a study replicating Brown-Séquard's method determined that the amount of testosterone obtained was too low to have any clinical effect.

Testosterone, the most active anabolic-androgenic steroid produced by Leydig cells in the testes, was first isolated in 1935 and chemically synthesized later in the same year. Synthetic derivatives of testosterone quickly followed. By the end of the following decade, both testosterone and its derivatives were applied with varying degrees of success for a number of medical conditions. It was not until the 1950s, however, that athletes began to discover that anabolic steroids could increase their muscle mass. According to sports physician John Ziegler, the first confirmed use of an anabolic steroid in an international athletic competition was at the weightlifting championships in Vienna in 1954, when Russian weightlifters used testosterone.

Throughout the 1960s and 1970s, the use of anabolic steroids was confined largely to the professional levels of sport. In the Eastern bloc, programs of training went as far as forcing some athletes to take anabolic steroids. In the United States, sports physicians, including Ziegler, and medical texts were still widely proclaiming that anabolic steroids were ineffective in helping athletes gain muscle. These doctors did acknowledge the usefulness of anabolic steroids for debilitated patients. The package insert for Dianabol, a common anabolic steroid used at the time, stated, "Anabolic steroids do not enhance athletic ability." Despite these warnings, use of anabolic steroids began in competition bodybuilding, in track and field events, such as the shot put, and in other sports where performance depended on muscle strength or speed of recovery during training.

At the end of the 1960s, Science published a study on the effects of Dianabol on athletes. This open label study, conducted by J.P. O'Shea and colleagues at Oregon State University, confirmed the muscle building effects of anabolic steroids on athletes that followed a high protein diet. Two years later, O'Shea replicated the results in a double blind design.

At the beginning of the 1970s, sporting organizations, including the IOC and NCAA, declared the use of anabolic steroids unethical, but with no effective means of testing athletes, the issue remained academic.

== Prevalence and user profiles ==
=== General population ===
It is difficult to determine what percent of the population have used anabolic steroids due to the fact that most studies are based on self-reporting. Studies in the United States have shown anabolic steroid users tend to be mostly middle-class heterosexual men with a median age of about 25 who are noncompetitive bodybuilders and non-athletes. They cite using the drugs for cosmetic purposes. Another study found that non-medical use of anabolic steroids among college students was at, or less than, 1%. According to a 2006 survey, 78.4% of steroid users were noncompetitive bodybuilders and non-athletes. About 13% reported unsafe injection practices such as reusing needles, sharing needles, and sharing multi-dose vials, though a 2007 study found sharing of needles was extremely uncommon (less than 1%) among individuals using anabolic steroids for non-medical purposes. Another 2007 study found that 74% of non-medical anabolic steroid users had secondary college degrees and more had completed college and less had failed to complete high school than is expected from the general population. The same study found that individuals using anabolic steroids for non-medical purposes had a higher employment rate and a higher household income than the general population. Anabolic steroid users research the drugs they are taking more than other controlled-substance users; however, the major sources consulted by steroid users include friends, non-medical handbooks, and fitness magazines, which can provide questionable or inaccurate information. According to a 1998 study, 2.7% of middle school (age 9-13) students in the United States reported using steroids, with 2.8% being female and 2.6% being male. A 1988 study found that 6.6% of 12th grade (17 or 18 years old) students use or have used steroids.

Anabolic steroid users tend to be disillusioned by the portrayal of anabolic steroids as deadly in the media and in politics. According to one study, anabolic steroid users also distrust their physicians, and in the sample, 56% had not disclosed their anabolic steroid use to their physicians. Another 2007 study showed that while 66% of individuals using anabolic steroids for non-medical purposes were willing to seek medical supervision for their steroid use, 58% lacked trust in their physicians, 92% felt that the medical community's knowledge of non-medical anabolic steroid use was lacking, and 99% felt that the public has an exaggerated view of the side effects of anabolic steroid use. A 2006 study showed that long-term anabolic steroid users were more likely to have symptoms of muscle dysmorphia and also showed stronger endorsement of more traditional male roles.

=== Sports ===
Anabolic steroids have been used by athletes in many professional sports, including track and field, weightlifting, bodybuilding, shot put, cycling, baseball, wrestling, mixed martial arts, boxing, and football. Such use is prohibited by many of the professional and amateur associations that organize these sports.

Anabolic steroid use occurs among adolescents, especially by those participating in competitive sports. It has been suggested that the prevalence of use among high-school students in the U.S. may be as high as 2.7%. Male students used anabolic steroids more frequently than female students and, on average, those who participated in sports used steroids more often than those who did not.

=== Celebrity controversies ===
In 1992, NFL football player Lyle Alzado died from brain cancer, which he said was caused by his steroid use. Although 17α-alkylated steroids have been known to cause liver cancer, when taken by mouth, there is no published evidence that anabolic steroids cause either brain cancer or the specific type of T-cell lymphoma that caused Alzado's death. However, Alzado also stated that he felt addicted to steroids and that he had become increasingly violent.

Arnold Schwarzenegger acknowledged using anabolic steroids for many years during his bodybuilding career, although steroids were legal in the US during the time he used them. In 1997, he underwent surgery to correct a heart defect. Some have assumed this was because of his use of anabolic steroids. Although the use of anabolic steroids can sometimes cause enlargement and thickening of the left ventricle, Schwarzenegger was born with a congenital genetic defect in which his heart had a bicuspid aortic valve, a condition that rendered his aortic valve with two cusps instead of three, which can occasionally cause problems later in life.

== Doping ==
The use of anabolic steroids is banned by all major sporting associations, including the International Olympic Committee, Major League Baseball, the National Football League, the National Basketball Association, the National Hockey League, WWE, ICC, ITF, FIFA, World Rugby, FINA, UEFA, the European Athletic Association, and the Brazilian Football Confederation. Anabolic steroids are controlled substances in many countries, including Argentina, Australia, Brazil, Canada, the Netherlands (NL), the United Kingdom (UK), and the United States (U.S.).

The Olympics, the National Basketball Association, the National Hockey League, and the National Football League also ban the use of anabolic steroids. The World Anti-Doping Agency (WADA) maintains the list of performance-enhancing substances used by many major sports associations and includes all anabolic agents, which includes all anabolic steroids and precursors as well as all hormones and related substances. Spain passed an anti-doping law that created a national anti-doping agency. Italy passed a law in 2000 where penalties range up to three years in prison if an athlete has tested positive for banned substances. In 2006, Russian President Vladimir Putin signed into law ratification of the International Convention Against Doping in Sport, which would encourage cooperation with WADA. Many other countries have similar legislation prohibiting anabolic steroids in sports, including Denmark, France, the Netherlands, and Sweden.

== Legal status and politics ==
The legal status of anabolic steroids varies from country to country. In the U.S., anabolic steroids are listed as Schedule III controlled substances under the Controlled Substances Act, which makes the possession of such substances without a prescription a federal crime punishable by up to seven years in prison. In Canada, anabolic steroids and their derivatives are part of the Controlled drugs and substances act and are Schedule IV substances, meaning that it is illegal to obtain or sell them without a prescription. However, possession is not punishable, a consequence reserved for schedule I, II or III substances. Those guilty of buying or selling anabolic steroids in Canada can be imprisoned for up to 18 months. Importing or exporting anabolic steroids also carry similar penalties. Anabolic steroids are also illegal without prescription in Australia, Argentina, Brazil, and Portugal, and are listed as Schedule 4 Controlled Drugs in the United Kingdom.

=== United States ===
The United States first considered classifying anabolic steroids as a controlled substance in the late 1980s after a controversy over Ben Johnson's victory at the 1988 Summer Olympics in Seoul. During deliberations, the American Medical Association (AMA), Drug Enforcement Administration (DEA), Food and Drug Administration (FDA), and the National Institute on Drug Abuse (NIDA) all opposed listing anabolic steroids as controlled substances. These organizations argued that use of these drugs does not lead to the physical or psychological dependence required for such scheduling under the Controlled Substance Act. However, anabolic steroids were added to Schedule III of the Controlled Substances Act in the Anabolic Steroids Control Act of 1990. The same act also introduced more stringent controls with higher criminal penalties for offenses involving the illegal distribution of anabolic steroids and human growth hormone. By the early 1990s, after non-medical use of anabolic steroids was criminalized in the U.S., several pharmaceutical companies stopped manufacturing or marketing the products. Some brand names included Ciba, Searle, and Syntex. In the Controlled Substances Act, anabolic steroids are defined to be any drug or hormonal substance chemically and pharmacologically related to testosterone (other than estrogens, progestins, and corticosteroids) that promote muscle growth. The act was amended by the Anabolic Steroid Control Act of 2004, which added prohormones to the list of controlled substances, with effect from January 20, 2005.

=== United Kingdom ===
In the United Kingdom, anabolic steroids are completely legal for personal use although it is illegal to sell them. In 2008, a study published in the Lancet suggested that anabolic steroids are less dangerous than most other illegal substances, and some legal ones.

== Economics and law enforcement ==
=== Illegal trade ===
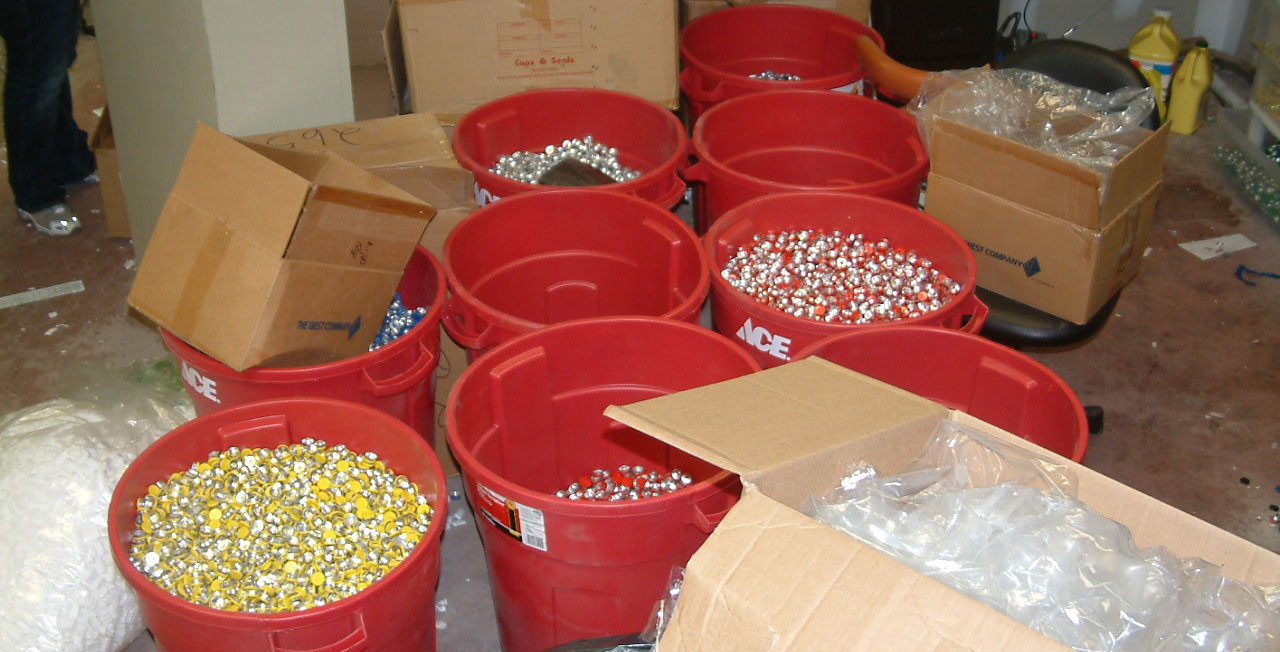
Several large buckets of anabolic steroid vials confiscated during a DEA raid

In countries where anabolic steroids are illegal or controlled, the majority of steroids are obtained illegally through black market trade. These steroids are usually manufactured in other countries, and therefore must be smuggled across international borders.

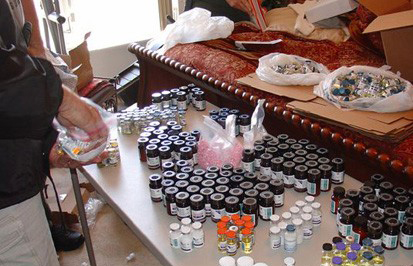
A large stash of anabolic steroid vials confiscated during "Operation Gear Grinder" undertaken by the Drug Enforcement Administration which ended in September 2007.

In September 2007, the DEA completed an 18-month international investigation of illicit anabolic steroid use in which 124 arrests were made. The investigation targeted more than 25 Chinese companies which produced raw materials for producing steroids and human growth hormone. The companies exported raw products to Mexico, where the consumer products were packaged. The investigation, dubbed "Operation Gear Grinder," was the largest anabolic steroid operation in the United States, and involved China, Mexico, Canada, Australia, Germany, and Thailand, among other countries. The investigation also focused on online message boards where advice was given on how to use anabolic steroids. The DEA also intercepted thousands of e-mails in the course of the investigation. The DEA has stated that the e-mails intercepted were compiled into a massive database of names which could lead to months or years of future arrests of steroid users.

=== Production ===
Anabolic steroids are produced in pharmaceutical laboratories, but in nations where stricter laws are present, they are also produced in small homemade laboratories. Common problems associated with illegal drug trades, such as chemical substitutions, cutting, and diluting, affect illegal anabolic steroids, so that when they reach the distribution level, the quality may be compromised and the drugs may be dangerous. In the 1990s, most U.S. producers such as Ciba, Searle and Syntex stopped making and marketing anabolic steroids within the U.S. However, in many other regions, particularly Eastern Europe, they are still mass-produced.

Anabolic steroids are still in wide use for veterinary purposes, and often contain the same components as those prepared for humans, but without the same quality control. These can also be dangerous, as they may have been produced and handled in cruder and less sterile environments. Often times these veterinary grade anabolic steroids are used by athletes in a measure to bypass restrictions in their local countries. Administration of such carries huge risks and users are often rushed to hospitals with complications. Though different laws encompass usage of anabolic steroids under different jurisdictions, such underground illicit usage is discouraged by the online athletic/steroids communities as well.

=== Distribution ===
In the U.S., Canada, and Europe, illicit steroids are purchased just like any other illegal drug. Dealers are able to obtain the steroids from a number of sources. Illegal anabolic steroids are sometimes sold at gyms, competitions, and through the mail, but may also be obtained through pharmacists, veterinarians, and physicians. In addition, a significant number of counterfeit products are sold as anabolic steroids, particularly via mail order from websites posing as overseas pharmacies. In the U.S., black market importation continues from Mexico, Thailand, and other countries where steroids are not illegal.

== See also ==
- Androgen replacement therapy
- Growth hormone
- Muscle dysmorphia
- Performance-enhancing drugs
- Steroid rosacea
- Steroid use in Bollywood
- Bigger, Stronger, Faster*
- Juiced: Wild Times, Rampant 'Roids, Smash Hits & How Baseball Got Big
- Selective androgen receptor modulator
