= Bosley Minn =

Coordinates: 53.1974°N 2.0886°W

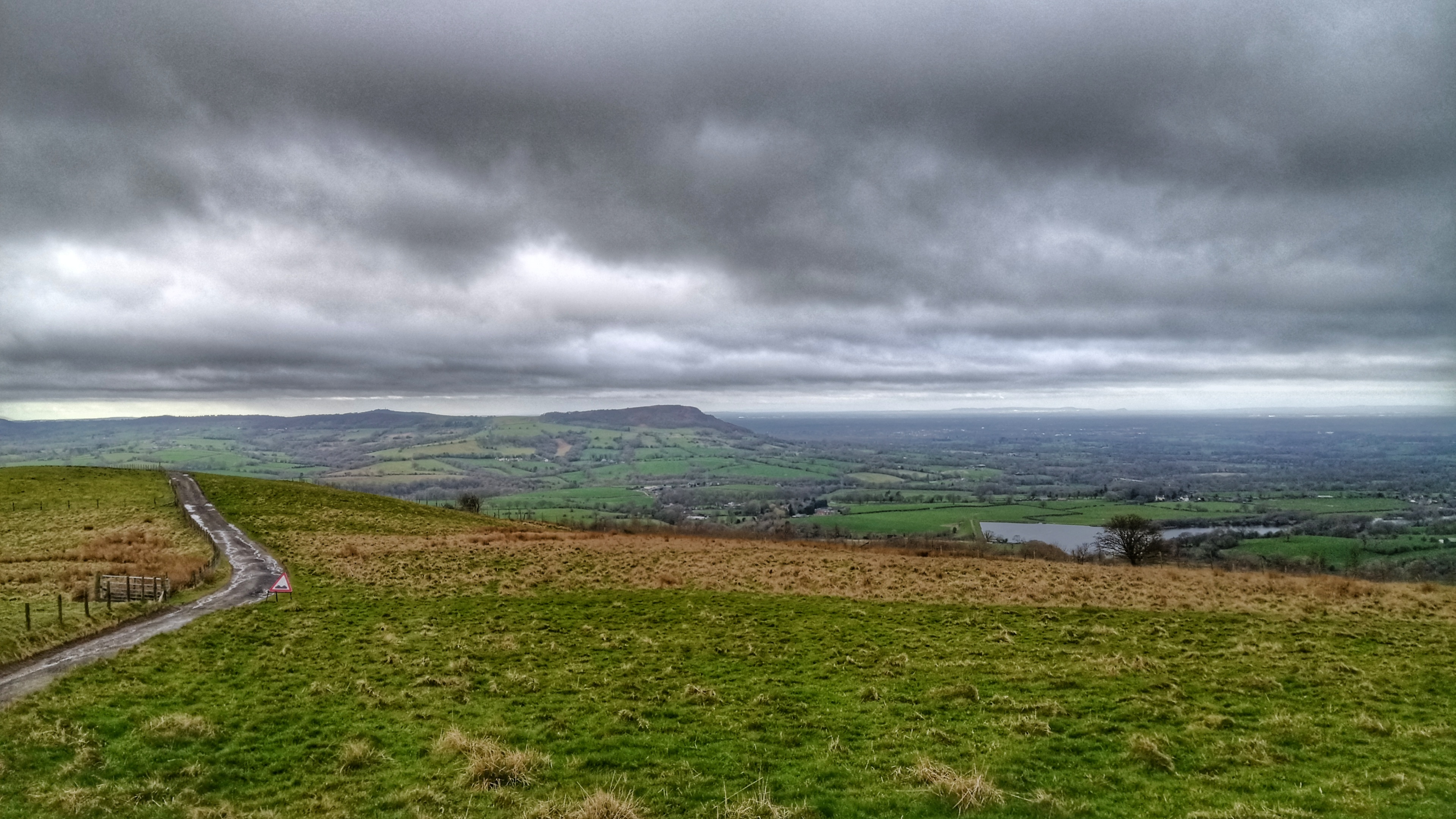
View west from Bosley Minn showing The Cloud, Bosley Reservoir, and Cheshire beyond

Bosley Minn is one of two names – the other being Wincle Minn – given to a prominent hill in southeast Cheshire and in the southwestern corner of the Peak District National Park in northern England. The long axis of the Minn runs NNE–SSW and its broad summit, which reaches to 386 metres (1,266 ft) at its highest point, slopes away to the valley of the Shell Brook in the east and towards Bosley Reservoir in the west. It is the western aspect of the hill, facing Bosley which is known as Bosley Minn whilst the eastern side which faces the village of Wincle is referred to as Wincle Minn.

== Geology ==
The hill is formed in a succession of sandstones and mudstones which comprise the Millstone Grit Group of rocks. In particular it is the various beds of the Carboniferous Namurian age "Minn Sandstone" which have withstood erosion by ice and water and resulted in the present day shape of the Minn. A spectacular glacial meltwater channel runs along the western side of the hill, one of several on this western margin of the Peak District up against which Irish Sea ice was banked during the last ice age.

== Access ==
Although there is rough grazing on the slopes of the hill, no part of it falls within the definitions of open country as set out under the Countryside and Rights of Way Act 2000 so there is no access land across which walkers may roam. Nevertheless, access is enjoyed along the north-south crest of the ridge by means of a minor public road which is followed by the Gritstone Trail recreational path. In addition a few steep public footpaths ascend its eastern and southern slopes from the Shell Brook and the vicinity of Bosley Reservoir respectively. It is via one of these paths that the Gritstone Trail connects with the Dane Valley to the south.
