= Bosler (surname) =

Bosler is a surname. Notable people with the surname include:

- Jean Bosler (1878–1973), French astronomer and author
- John Bosler (born 1933), Australian rugby union player
- Nan Bosler (born 1935), Australian community activist and advocate
- Virginia Bosler (1926–2020), American actress

== See also ==
- Bosley (surname)
