= Rudyard railway station =

Former railway station in Staffordshire, England

Rudyard
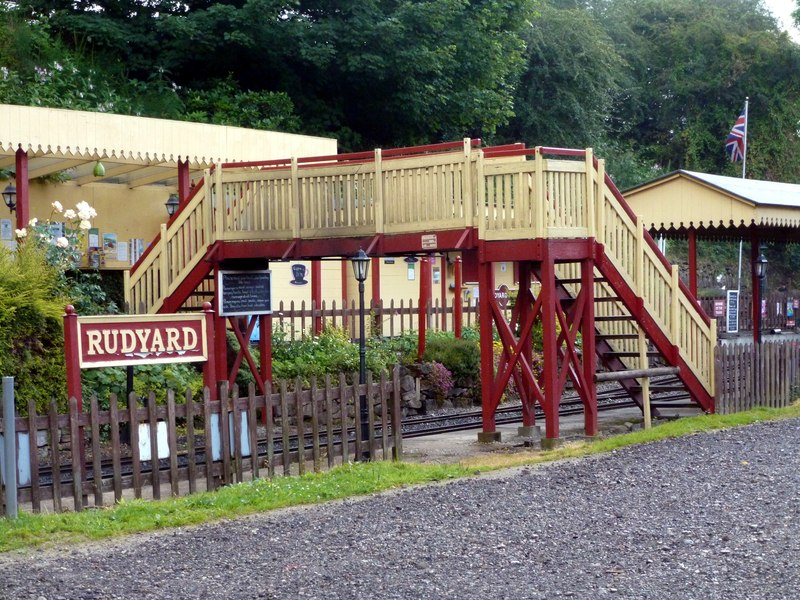
- The site of the station in July 2012

General information
- Location: Rudyard, Staffordshire Moorlands, Staffordshire; England
- Coordinates: 53.1180°N 2.0678°W
- Grid reference: SJ955579
- Platforms: 2

Other information
- Status: Disused

History
- Original company: North Staffordshire Railway
- Post-grouping: London, Midland and Scottish Railway; London Midland Region of British Railways

Key dates
- 22 July 1850: Opened
- 1 April 1926: Name changed to Rudyard Lake
- 7 November 1960: Closed to passengers
- 15 June 1964: Closed to freight
Location

Rudyard railway station served the village of Rudyard, in Staffordshire, England.

== History ==
The station was opened by the North Staffordshire Railway (NSR) in 1850 on the Churnet Valley line. In the village, the NSR also owned the Rudyard Hotel as part of the company's efforts to develop Rudyard Lake and its environs as a tourist destination.

In 1926, the London, Midland and Scottish Railway renamed the station Rudyard Lake and the existing Rudyard Lake station, at the north end of the lake, was renamed Cliffe Park.

As Rudyard Lake station, it remained open until passenger services were withdrawn from the northern end of the Churnet Valley line (North Rode – Leek) in 1960. Freight services lasted until 1964, when they too were withdrawn and the track was lifted.

== Subsequent use ==
In 1978 a miniature railway was built on the west side of the trackbed from Rudyard Station to the Dam. This closed two years later and was moved to the Suffolk wildlife park. and then to Trago Mills in Devon. One of the locomotives, a model of the Leek and Manifold Valley Light Railway engine No.1 E. R. Calthrope now periodically revisits the current railway at Rudyard.

A further 10.25 inches (26.0 cm) minimum gauge railway was started in 1985 and extended to a distance of 1.5 miles (2.4 km) towards Cliffe Park station. Today the station area is used by the Rudyard Lake Steam Railway as its headquarters and as a public car park. Rudyard station now includes engine and carriage sheds, workshop, signal box, footbridge, the Platform 2 café and a level crossing. The railway has five steam locomotives and 11 carriages and a number of wagons and operates year-round. This railway celebrated its 25th anniversary in 2010.

The original up side standard gauge platform and retaining walls and flower beds are still visible. The Platform 2 cafe now uses this area for its seating and the original waiting shelter foundations for its buildings.

== Route ==
Merlin coupling up at Rudyard station in 2013

Preceding station	Historical railways	Following station
Cliffe Park; Line and station closed	North Staffordshire Railway; Churnet Valley Line	Leek; Line and station closed
