= Bosley (automobile) =

Defunct American motor vehicle manufacturer

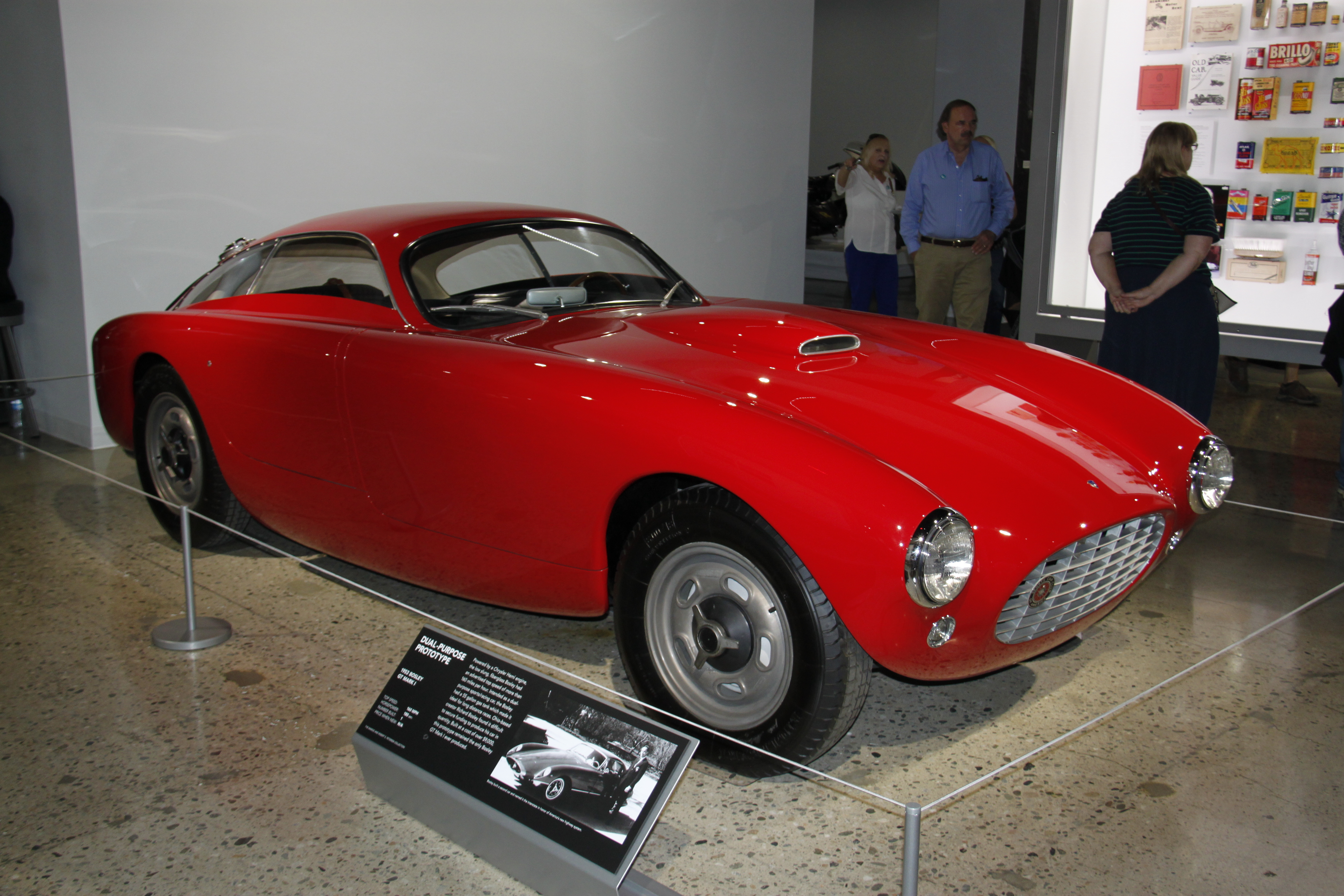
Bosley GT Mark I at the Petersen Automotive Museum

The Bosley was an American prototype automobile built in Mentor, Ohio, U.S. in 1953 by American automotive engineer and designer Richard Bosley. Bosley wanted to build a car that would surpass any car available on the market at the time. The car featured a steel tube frame and a 5.4L Chrysler Hemi V-8 mated to a Borg-Warner 5-speed transmission. The car featured a very graceful fibreglass body, which was amazing considering Bosley was a horticulturist who had never studied design or engineering.

The car was featured in magazines such as "Motor World", "The Motor in England", Road and Track", "Motor Life" and "Hot Rod". Bosley clocked up approximately 100,000 miles on the car before trading it in the mid-1960s for a Chevrolet Corvette, which was to form the basis of a line of street cars called the Bosley Interstate.

The car still survives and appears occasionally at car shows.
