= Boßler =

Coordinates: 48°36′N 9°36′E

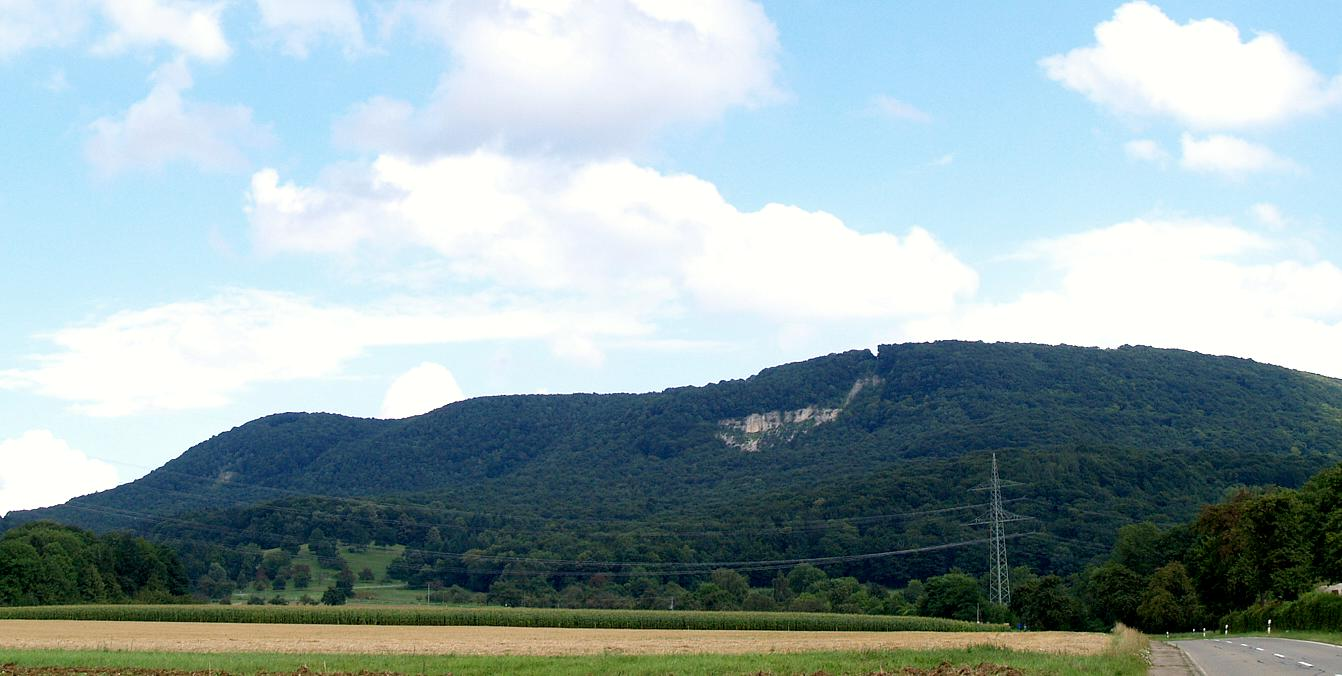

Highest point
- Elevation: 799.7 m (2,624 ft)

Geography
- Location: Baden-Württemberg, Germany

Boßler is a 799.7-metre-high (2,624 ft) mountain in the Swabian Alps, Baden-Württemberg, Germany.

== Tourism ==
Located at an elevation of 785 m is the Boßlerhaus (Bossler House), a working agricultural building run by the local group Friends of Nature Göppingen. It is beside the Gruibinger Wiesle, a popular hiking destination. 500 m west of the house there is a viewpoint on the escarpment at an altitude of 794 m which offers a view far to the west. The Swabian Alp-North Rim Trail passes through this point.

== Plane crashes ==
Boßler has been the site of several fatal air crashes. In most cases these were controlled flights into terrain due to pilots flying into the unexpectedly high mountain in the poor visibility.

- 1940-1945: a German Ju 88 and another military plane
- 8 January 1958: two U.S. F-100D jets
- 17 August 1959: a Bundeswehr Piaggio P.149
- 9 April 1965: a U.S. Bell UH-1 Iroquois helicopter
- 11 April 1965: a Piper PA-22
- 14 June 1966: a Fiat G.91 jet fighter
- 17 July 1979: a Cessna F 172 H light aircraft
- 28 September 2005: an air ambulance, Christoph 51, on a clear day

== See also ==
- Boßler Tunnel
