= John Bosley Ziegler =

American doctor

John Bosley Ziegler (ca. 1920–1983) — known as John Ziegler and Montana Jack — was the American physician who originally developed the anabolic steroid Methandrostenolone (Dianabol, DBOL) which was released in the US in 1958 by Ciba. He pioneered its athletic use as an aid to muscle growth by bodybuilders, administering it to U.S. weightlifting champion Bill March of the York Barbell Club in 1959 when he was the physician to the U.S. Weightlifting team. It was banned by the Food and Drug Administration (FDA) under the Controlled Substances Act. Later in his life, he was outspoken against its use in sport, saying "It is bad enough to have to deal with drug addicts, but now healthy athletes are putting themselves in the same category. It's a disgrace. Who plays sports for fun anymore?" Ziegler suffered from heart disease, which he partially ascribed to his experimentation with steroids, and he died from heart failure in 1983.

== Biography ==
=== Early life ===
Ziegler was born in the Midwestern United States but he returned to his family roots in southern Pennsylvania and graduated from Gettysburg College in 1942. He was descended from three generations of doctors going back to the American Civil War, and his father had been both practicing physician and a scientist who had discovered the salt tablet.

He served as an officer in the United States Marine Corps in the Pacific in World War II, where he suffered extensive bullet wounds. His experience of surgery and convalescence lead to a speciality in recuperative medicine at the University of Maryland Medical School. He served his internship and residency at Marine hospitals in Norfolk Virginia and Mobile Alabama, before completing a two-year residence in neurology at Tulane University School of Medicine in New Orleans. In 1954, after he settled in Olney, Maryland he specialized in the treatment of handicapped and seriously injured patients whilst conducting part-time chemistry research at Ciba Pharmaceuticals in Summit, N.J.

He became an enthusiastic weightlifter who pumped iron at the York Barbell Club, which was at the center of American fitness training thanks to its owner Bob Hoffman. Hoffman had competed with Joe Weider and Charles Atlas for the title of Mr America and wrote the book Weight Lifting in 1939. Ziegler's scientific credentials supplemented Hoffman's bodybuilding theories. Ziegler befriended weightlifter and bodybuilder champion John Grimek who was employed by Hoffman.

=== Developing anabolic steroids ===
In October 1954, Ziegler, went to Vienna with the American weightlifting team. There he met a Russian physicist who, over "a few drinks", repeatedly asked "What are you giving your boys?" When Ziegler returned the question, the Russian said that his own athletes were being given testosterone. Returning to America, Ziegler tried weak doses of testosterone on himself, on the American trainer Bob Hoffman and on three lifters, John Grimek, Jim Park and Yaz Kuzahara. All gained more weight and strength than any training programme would produce, but there were side-effects. With the research assistance of Ciba Pharmaceuticals, Ziegler began to look for synthetic substance that would mimic testosterone. Working at CIBA allowed Ziegler access to books and records from Germany where experiments with testosterone had been carried out by the Nazis, and which had been confiscated by the United States after the war. Ziegler sought a drug without after-effects and hit on an anabolic steroid, methandrostenolone (Dianabol, DBOL), made in the U.S. in 1958 by Ciba.

Ziegler gave Dianabol to the entire U.S. Olympic weightlifting team in Rome in 1960, but they still lost to the Soviets. He gave up experimentation with athletes when he learned that some who had taken 20 times the recommended dose of Dianabol had developed a liver condition. He was quoted in Science in 1972 saying "I lost interest in fooling with IQ's of that caliber. Now it's about as widespread among these idiots as marijuana." In later years Ziegler regretted introducing AAS to athletes. He recollected "but I wish to God now I’d never done it. I’d like to go back and take that whole chapter out of my life."

== See also ==
- Ergogenic use of anabolic steroids
- Doping in sports
