= Bosley Medical Institute, Inc. v. Kremer =

Bosley Medical Institute v. Kremer
- Court: United States Court of Appeals for the Ninth Circuit
- Full case name: Bosley Medical Institute, Inc., and Bosley Medical Group, S.C., v. Michael Steven Kremer
- Argued: March 8 2005
- Decided: April 4 2005
- Citation: 403 F.3d 672

Holding
- Defendant Michael Kremer cannot be held liable for trademark infringement or dilution for his critical use of the Bosley Medical Group's trademarks, affirming the District Court holding. Bosley is not liable for the Anti-SLAPP violation because they did not violate Kremer's free speech.

Court membership
- Judge sitting: William Q. Hayes,

Laws applied
- 28 U.S.C. § 1291

Bosley Medical Institute v. Kremer, 403 F.3d 672, is a case in which the United States Court of Appeals for the Ninth Circuit affirmed, reversed and remanded the rulings of the United States District Court for the Southern District of California, holding that defendant, Michael Kremer, could not be held liable for trademark infringement or dilution for his use of the Bosley Medical Group's name in creating a website that was critical of the company's business practices.

== Background ==
Bosley Medical Institute is the plaintiff and the owner of the trademarks Bosley, Bosley Medical, and Bosley Healthy Hair, as well as other trademarks. Bosley Medical Institute was founded L. Lee Bosley, M.D. and is a "Delaware Corporation which manages and markets hair transplantation, restoration, and replacement services to the public."

Michael Steven Kremer was the defendant and a former patient of Bosley Medical Institute and was dissatisfied with his experience with the company. Kremer was the former patient of Dr. David Smith in Seattle, Washington and received hair replacement services in which he was unhappy with the results. Kremer filed a medical malpractice lawsuit against Bosley Medical but the case was dismissed on summary judgment.

On January 7, 2000, Kremer registered the www.BosleyMedical.com domain name, as well as www.BosleyMedicalViolations.com, which was not challenged by Bosley in this case. Kremer then proceeded to go to the Bosley Medical office in Beverly Hills, California five days after registering the domain and delivered a letter to Dr. Bosley, the founder and President of Bosley Medical. Contained within the letter was the following text:

Let me know if you want to discuss this. Once it is spread over the internet it will have a snowball effect and be too late to stop. M. Kremer [phone number]. P.S. I always follow through on my promises.

— Bosley Medical Institute, Inc. v. Kremer, 403 F. 3d 672 - Court of Appeals, 9th Circuit 2005

The second page was entitled “Courses of action against BMG” and listed eleven items. The first item stated: “1. Net web sites disclosing true operating nature of BMG. Letter 3/14/96 from LAC D.A. Negative testimonials from former clients. Links. Provide BMG competitors with this information.”

— Bosley Medical Institute, Inc. v. Kremer, 403 F. 3d 672 - Court of Appeals, 9th Circuit 2005

Kremer's site www.BosleyMedical.com summarized the Los Angeles County District Attorney's 1996 investigative findings about Bosley among other information that was highly critical of Bosley. Kremer did not earn any revenue from the website neither did he sell any goods or services through the website. However, the website did contain a link to BosleyMedicalViolations.com, another site by Kremer that linked to the alt.baldspot newsgroup that contained advertisements for companies that competed with Bosley, and Public Citizen website, which represented Kremer in the case.

== Procedural Background ==
Bosley brought a suit against Kremer alleging trademark infringement, dilution, unfair competition, various state law claims, and a libel claim (eventually settled). Represented by Paul Alan Levy of Public Citizen Litigation Group, Kremer secured a ruling that his use was noncommercial and unlikely to cause confusion. A summary judgment for Kremer on the federal claims was entered by the district court which also dismissed the state law claims under California's anti-SLAPP (Strategic lawsuit against public participation) statute.

The district court in the original case arrived at the following conclusions:

- Kremer's use of the Bosley name in his website is free speech, therefore Bosley is attempting to chill Kremer's free speech through lawsuits in violation of California's Anti-SLAPP law.
- Kremer did not profit commercially from using the Bosley name therefore his use and registration of www.BosleyMedical.com is not in violation of ACPA the anti-cybersquatting law.
- Kremer did not infringe or dilute the Bosley brand name trademark because his site did not seek to profit financially and did not offer any services to confuse a visitor.

The district court then granted Kremer summary judgment. Bosley then appealed the case to United States Court of Appeals for the Ninth Circuit.

== Ninth Circuit appeal ==
On appeal, the Ninth Circuit affirmed the District Court's entry of summary judgement in favor of Kremer, reversed the anti-SLAPP motion to strike the state law claims and remanded the ACPA claim for further proceedings. The Ninth Circuit issued its opinion on April 4, 2005, affirming in part, reversing in part and remanding the District Court's decision.

=== Trademark Infringement and Dilution Claims ===
The Circuit Court ruled that "Bosley cannot use the Lanham Act either as a shield from Kremer's criticism, or as a sword to shut Kremer up." The Court recognized that the Lanham Act was to be applied in commercial contexts and does not prohibit all unauthorized uses of a trademark. They concluded that any harm that came to Bosley was from Kremer's criticism of their services rather than from a competitor's sale of a similar product under Bosley's trademark because, according to the Court, "no customer will mistakenly purchase a hair replacement service from Kremer under the belief that the service is being offered by Bosley.

=== Anticybersquatting Consumer Protection Act ===
Using the Anticybersquatting Consumer Protection Act ("ACPA") passed by Congress in 1999, the Circuit Court reversed the district courts dismissal of Bosley's ACPA claim. The district court dismissed the claim "for the same reasons that it dismissed the infringement and dilution claims - namely, because Kremer did not make commercial use of Bosley's mark."

The Circuit Court found that the district court was wrong in applying the commercial use requirement to Bosley's ACPA claim. The district court should have instead focused on "whether Kremer had a bad faith intent to profit from his use of Bosley's mark in his site's domain name"

The Circuit Court also found that the district court was wrong in granting summary judgement for Kremer on the ACPA claim due to the fact that the court did not notify Bosley that it would rule on this claim and in turn did not provide them a chance to conduct discovery on the issue.

=== California's Anti-SLAPP Law ===
The Circuit Court found that in an infringement lawsuit by a trademark owner over a defendant's unauthorized use of the mark as his domain, the defendant's free speech rights are not necessarily impaired. The Court reversed the district court's granting Kermer anti-SLAPP motion to strike Bosley's state law trademark claims because they had ruled that Bosley was seeking to limit Kremer's free speech. "The court concludes that while a summary judgment motion might have been appropriate, an anti-SLAPP motion was not."

== Impact ==
=== Reinstatement of the ACPA ===
The Circuit court's decision to reverse the district court's claim that Bosley did not violate the Anti-SLAPP law, a law created with the intent of preventing big companies from chilling individual's free speech rights, sets the precedent that ACPA takes precedence over Anti-SLAPP. In simple terms, a company may silence free speech if the person they are silencing is a cyber-squatter directly using their name to exercise his or her free speech even without commercial gain.
