= Bosley (surname) =

Bosley is a surname.

== People ==
Notable people with the surname include:

- Bruce Bosley (1933–1995), American footballer
- Charles B. Bosley (died 1959), American politician and lawyer
- Freeman Bosley Jr. (born 1954), American politician
- John Bosley (politician) (1947–2022), Canadian politician
- Keith Bosley (1937–2018), British poet and translator
- Patricia Merbreier (1924–2011; née Bosley), American actress
- Tom Bosley (1927–2010), American actor

== Fictional characters ==
- Dave Bosley, a fictional character from the 2015 TV series You, Me and the Apocalypse
- John Bosley (Charlie's Angels), a private detective in the TV series Charlie's Angels

== See also ==
- Bosley (disambiguation)
