= Bosley railway station =

Former railway station in Cheshire, England

Coordinates: 53.18317°N 2.13155°W

Bosley
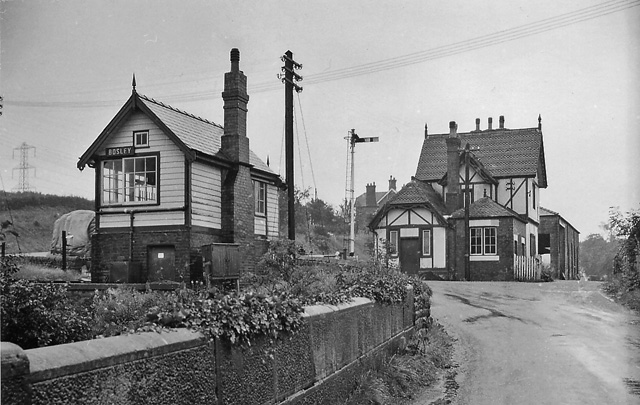
- Bosley station in 1963

General information
- Location: Bosley, Cheshire East; England
- Grid reference: SJ913651
- Platforms: 2

Other information
- Status: Disused

History
- Original company: North Staffordshire Railway
- Post-grouping: London, Midland and Scottish Railway, London Midland Region of British Railways

Key dates
- 1 September 1849: Opened
- 7 November 1960: Closed to passengers
- 15 June 1964: Closed to freight
Location

Bosley railway station served the village of Bosley, in Cheshire, England.

== History ==
The station was opened by the North Staffordshire Railway in September 1849, (Note: The station opened for public use on 1 September 1849 but had been used for an excursion train to Bosley Fair in early August 1849) as part of the Churnet Valley line.

The station was sited some distance from the village, to which it was linked by a footpath. Its main customer was the corn mill belonging to Francis R Thompstone & Sons Ltd, which was situated next to the station.

Thompstones also had their own 2 ft 6 in (762 mm) tramway which ran for 0.75 miles (1.21 km) from the mill to the Macclesfield Canal and was used for transporting corn from the canal to the mill. The tramway opened in 1887 and closed around 1925. Remains of the track can still just be seen in a shallow cutting through woodland, leading to the old transhipment dock, just below Bosley bottom lock.

Bosley station remained open until passenger services were withdrawn from the northern end of the Churnet Valley line (North Rode – Leek) in 1960. Freight services lasted until 1964, when they too were withdrawn and the track was lifted.

Preceding station	Historical railways	Following station
North Rode; Line open, station closed	North Staffordshire Railway; Churnet Valley Line	Rushton; Line and station closed

== The site today ==
Today, the station remains as a private residence and the church near it still remains active. The trackbed has been built on by industrial buildings; it can be traced on a map to Leek and Macclesfield.
