= Rudyard Lake =

Lake in Staffordshire, England

- Location within Staffordshire
- Location: Staffordshire
- Coordinates: 53°8′10″N 2°5′10″W
- Type: reservoir
- Primary outflows: Caldon Canal
- Basin countries: United Kingdom
- Managing agency: Canal & River Trust
- Built: 1799
- Surface area: 664,000 square metres (164 acres)
- Water volume: 2,950,000m³ (648 million gallons)

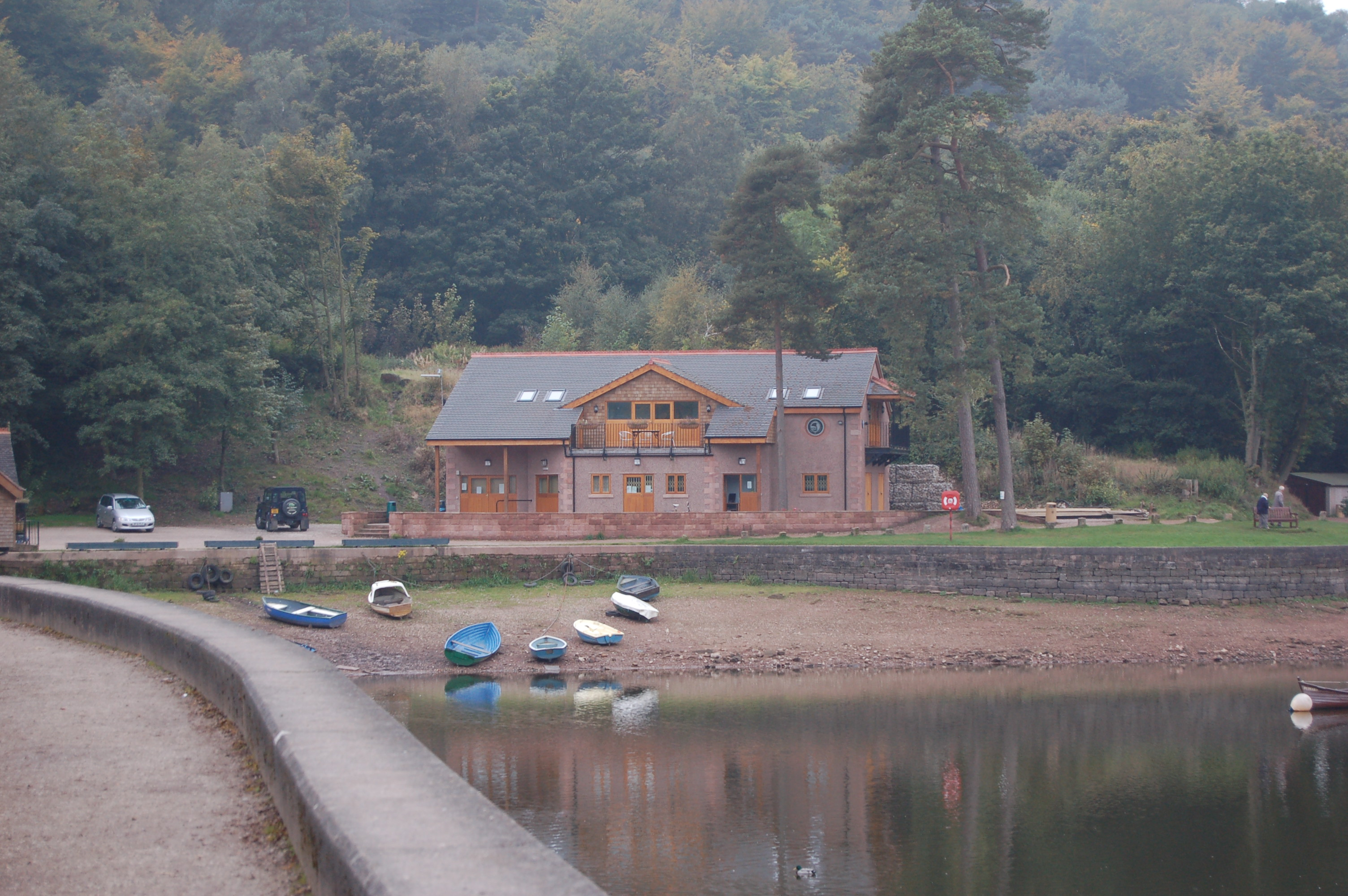
Rudyard Lake boat house

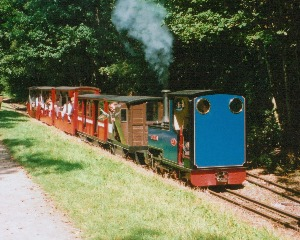
Rudyard miniature railway train

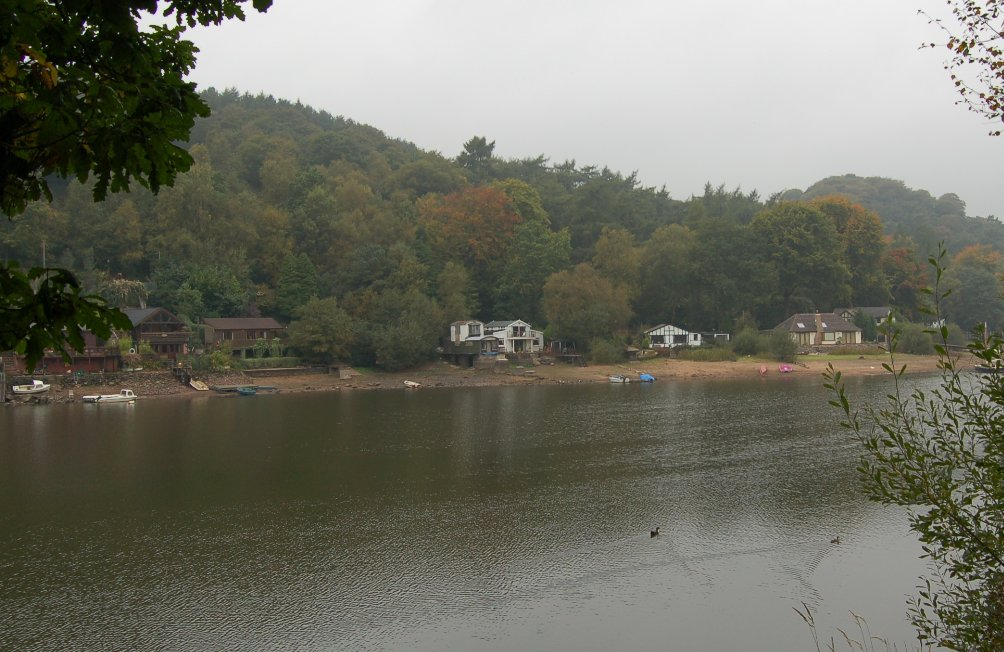
Lakeside homes

Rudyard Lake is a reservoir in Rudyard, Staffordshire, located north-west of the town of Leek, Staffordshire. It was constructed in the late 18th century to feed the Caldon Canal. During the 19th century, it was a popular destination for daytrippers taking advantage of easy access using the newly constructed North Staffordshire Railway. The lake is still used for many water activities such as boating, canoeing, fishing and also for walks and recreational steam train trips.

== History ==
Legend has it that the village of Rudyard was named after Ralph Rudyard, a local man reputed to have killed Richard III at the Battle of Bosworth Field, although as the place-name, meaning 'a yard or enclosure where rue is grown' in Old English, was first recorded in 1022 and subsequently mentioned in the Domesday Book in 1086 it is more likely that Ralph, if he ever existed, was named after the village.

Rudyard Lake was constructed by the engineer John Rennie, for the Trent and Mersey Canal company in 1797–98 to feed the Caldon Canal. The reservoir had been proposed in 1796, and would have been connected to the upper level of the Caldon Canal by a feeder, but in order to win the consent of landowners, the 3.3-mile (5.3 km) section below Leek was made navigable. The bill to promote the construction failed in Parliament, and there was a suggestion for a bigger scheme, involving a canal from Marple on the Peak Forest Canal to the Caldon Canal, passing through Macclesfield and Rudyard. Benjamin Outram, the engineer for the Peak Forest Canal, would have overseen the project, and again, it would have involved a reservoir at Rudyard. However, the Trent and Mersey re-submitted their bill in early 1797, and it became the Caldon Canal Act 1797 (37 Geo. 3. c. 36) in March.

As built, the lake is around 2 miles (3.2 km) long and 0.25 miles (0.40 km) wide. It was formed by creating a 63-foot (19 m) earth dam at the southern end of the steep wooded valley, which is faced with stone on the upstream side, to prevent erosion. A spillway, some 60 feet (18 m) wide, was built at the eastern side of the dam, and feeds the 2.5-mile (4 km) feeder that carries water to the Leek Branch. The main source of water supply to the lake is a feeder that runs from the headwaters of the River Dane. This was refurbished in the mid-1990s by the Waterway Recovery Group. The lake has gradually silted up, but there are problems associated with dredging it, due to a lack of access for vehicles, and English Nature's concern over the disturbance of some rare fauna.

On 26 June 1846 the North Staffordshire Railway successfully took over the canal company and lake as part of one of the acts of parliament that founded the railway. Having acquired the lake and the land around it, the railway used the land down one side as the route for its Churnet Valley Line between Macclesfield and Uttoxeter. Two stations were built, one at Rudyard village (later renamed Rudyard Lake) and one at the north end of the lake called Rudyard Lake (later renamed Cliffe Park)

Because of the accessibility brought by the railway stations, daytrippers and tourists began visiting the lake. Visitors included John Lockwood Kipling and Alice Macdonald, the parents of Rudyard Kipling, who met there on a trip from Burslem. They liked the place so much they named their son after it. By the end of the 19th century, crowds of up to 20,000 people could visit the lake on some days. Its popularity continued into the early 20th century, and over 20,000 visitors were carried to the site on 88 trains on a particular day in 1913.. In 1906 a golf course was opened the north west shore of the lake, but would be closed by 1926. Matthew Webb, the first man to swim the English Channel, entertained crowds by demonstrating his swimming in the lake, and Carlos Trower ("the African Blondin") performed a tightrope walk across the lake.

== Attractions ==
The lake is home to Rudyard Lake Sailing Club and North Staffordshire Rowing Club. Fishing, walking, canoeing and boat trips are popular attractions. The lake has a visitor centre, toilets and an activity centre which can be hired for functions or conferences. An annual lake festival is held on a Sunday in August and a firework display takes place in November.

The Rudyard Lake Steam Railway runs narrow gauge steam trains that operate up the east side of the lake on many days throughout the year. It is possible to walk round the lake or walk part way and start/finish the journey by steam train.

== Top Gear episode ==
The BBC's motoring show Top Gear held a challenge at the lake in 2006 to see which presenter had designed the best amphibious car. Richard Hammond's attempt sank while Jeremy Clarkson's attempt capsized with Richard on board at the end of the challenge. However, James May's Triumph Herald, complete with sail and mast, performed well, despite the almost total absence of wind, and he was able to drive it out of the water, thus winning the challenge.

== See also ==
- Canals of the United Kingdom
- History of the British canal system
