= Bosley Butte =

- Location within Oregon

Highest point
- Elevation: 3,423 ft (1,043 m) NAVD 88
- Prominence: 1,192 ft (363 m)
- Parent peak: Mineral Hill (3,652 ft)
- Isolation: 7.98 mi (12.84 km)
- Coordinates: 42°12′33″N 124°13′31″W

Geography
- Location: Curry County, Oregon, U.S.
- Parent range: Klamath Mountains
- Topo map: USGS Bosley Butte

Bosley Butte is a mountain in the Klamath Mountains of southwestern Oregon in the United States. It is located in southern Curry County in the extreme southwest corner of the state. It is approximately 5 miles (8 km) from the Pacific Ocean and 5 miles (8 km) north of the California state line.
