= Rudyard, Staffordshire =

Village in Staffordshire, England

Coordinates: 53°07′N 2°04′W

Rudyard is a lakeside village in the county of Staffordshire, England, west of Leek and on the shore of Rudyard Lake. Population details as taken at the 2011 census can be found under Horton.

The Rudyard railway station was opened by the North Staffordshire Railway on 22 July 1850.

== Toponymy ==
The place-name Rudyard is derived from the Old English rude + geard, first recorded in 1002, meaning 'a yard or enclosure where rue is grown'. The name subsequently appears in the Domesday Book of 1086 as 'Rudierd'.

== Rudyard Lake ==
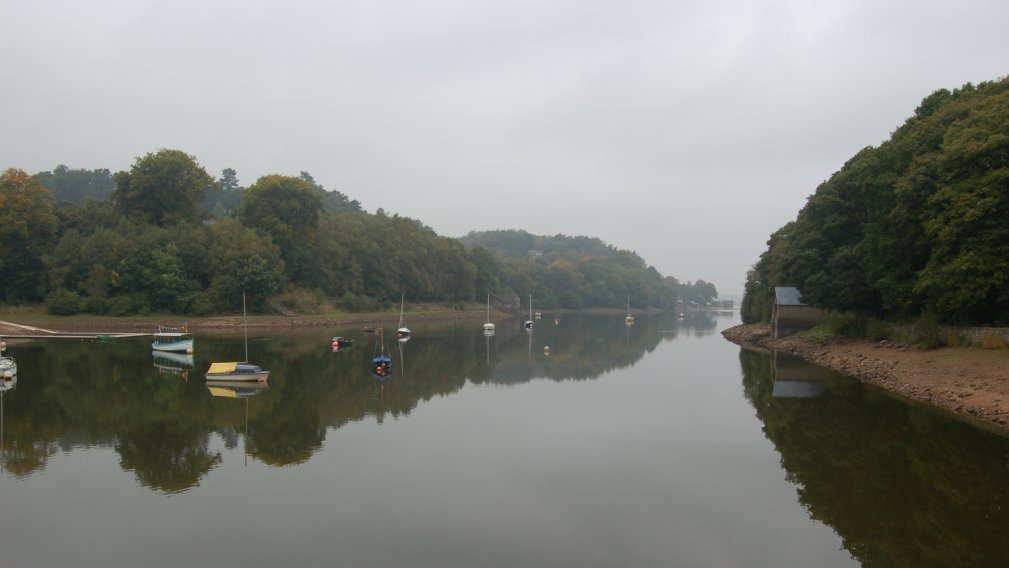
Rudyard Lake

The Rudyard Lake was built in 1797 by the engineer John Rennie, for the Trent and Mersey Canal company, to provide water for the Caldon Canal. The Rudyard Lake Steam Railway operates steam trains along a one and a 1.5 mi (2,400 m) track along the eastern side of the lake. The western shore is part of the Staffordshire Way, a long distance footpath.

The lakeside resort developed after the construction of the North Staffordshire Railway in 1845. On one particular day in 1877, more than 20,000 people came to watch Captain Webb - the first man to swim the English Channel - swim the reservoir. The parents of Rudyard Kipling, John Lockwood Kipling and Alice Macdonald, first met at Rudyard and named their son after the village. The lake is also home to Rudyard Lake Sailing Club and the Rudyard Lake Steam Railway.

== See also ==
- Listed buildings in Horton, Staffordshire
