= Bosley Reservoir =

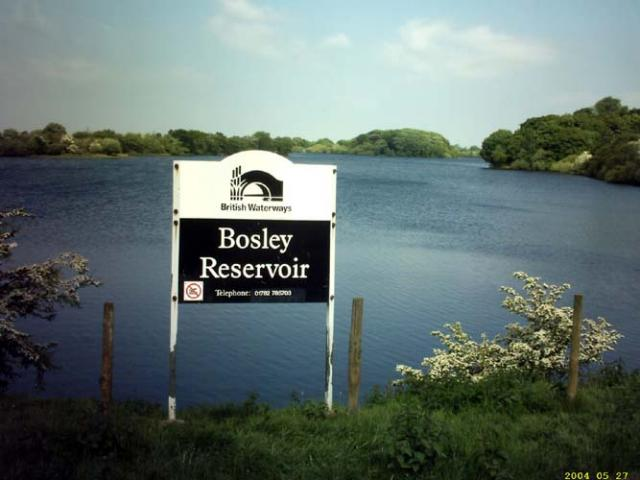

- Location within England
- Coordinates: 53°11′29″N 2°7′5″W
- Type: Reservoir
- Basin countries: United Kingdom

Bosley Reservoir is a large reservoir created to feed the Macclesfield Canal system, specifically the twelve Bosley locks. It is fed from the surrounding hills, including Bosley Cloud which rises to 1,125 feet (343 m).

== History ==
The Macclesfield Canal was surveyed by the canal engineer Thomas Telford in 1825, and was authorised by the Macclesfield Canal Act 1826 (7 Geo. 4. c. xxx) in April 1826. Although Telford was not involved in its construction, which was handled by the resident engineer William Crosley, it was typical of Telford's designs, with cuttings and embankments to create a line which was as straight and level as possible. This resulted in a canal with only two levels, connected together by a magnificently engineered flight of twelve locks at Bosley. The canal opened on 9 November 1831.

The canal runs along a ridge of hills to the west of the Pennines, and is at a relatively high level. The southern section from the Trent and Mersey Canal to the foot of Bosley locks is at 400 feet (122 m) above ordnance datum (AOD) and the locks raise the level by 118 feet (36 m) so that the summit level is at 518 feet (158 m) AOD. This required a reservoir to be built at a high level, where few of the streams were sufficiently large to maintain its level. The obvious source of water was the River Dane, which the canal crosses at the foot of the Bosley flight, but that already supplied the Caldon Canal and so could not be used. Instead, a network of almost 5 miles (8.0 km) of feeders were built on the hills, which extracted water from streams at thirteen locations. One fed the much smaller Turks Head or Sutton reservoir, two fed into the canal directly, and the rest supplied Bosley Reservoir. At each extraction point, a gauging plate was fitted to ensure that the stream below it still received some water, and the size of the cast iron gauging plates were specified in the original act of Parliament.

The canal company advertised for tenders to build the reservoirs in August 1827, with a closing date of 3 September. The contract included the making of a large stone dam at the southern end of the reservoir site, and the various feeders which would collect the water and deliver it to the canal. When finished the reservoir covered 86 acres (35 ha) and held 410 million imperial gallons (1,900 Ml). This was supplemented by the 92 million imperial gallons (420 Ml) held in Sutton Reservoir after that was completed in 1838. With traffic on the canal less than expected, surplus was sold, with Manchester Corporation buying 200 million imperial gallons (910 Ml) between 1844 and 1846, to top up Gorton Reservoir. The Manchester Corporation Waterworks Act 1847 (10 & 11 Vict. c. ccliii) authorised spending of £90,000 on improvements to the reservoir, but the work did not go ahead, as Manchester began obtaining its water from the Lake District shortly afterwards.

The reservoir was constructed in the valley of Bosley Brook, and compensation water had to be released through the dam to maintain a flow on the brook. The outflow feeds both the brook and the 2-mile (3.2 km) feeder which runs to the top lock. Ownership of the reservoir, along with the canal, passed to the Sheffield, Ashton-under-Lyne and Manchester Railway company in 1846, and then to a series of other railway companies as amalgamations took place, before becoming the responsibility of the British Transport Commission in 1948, when the railways were nationalised. It passed to British Waterways in 1962.

The capacity of the reservoir in 1959 was 367 million imperial gallons (1,670 Ml), but after a safety inspection, the water level was lowered by 7 feet (2.1 m) reducing the capacity to 212 million imperial gallons (960 Ml). With the growth of leisure traffic on the canal and the disuse of the water-saving side ponds on the locks, this capacity was proving inadequate by 1984, and a programme of raising the dam to prevent overtopping and erosion by wave action was started. When a new concrete overflow was completed in 1987, it allowed the level to be raised again by 5.5 feet (1.7 m), increasing the capacity to 321 million imperial gallons (1,460 Ml). Between 1920 and the 1960s, the island in the reservoir was owned by Yates Brothers Wine Lodges, as were the sporting rights. With the changes in water level, the island ceased to be one, and in 1988, the angling club built a causeway to it, ensuring that it will not become an island again. The dry summers of the early 1990s resulted in British Waterways carrying out extensive refurbishment of the feeders which supply the reservoir.

The reservoir was surveyed in 2001 by a hydrographic team working for British Waterways, as part of a three-year project to measure the capacity of all of its reservoirs. The team produced a digital map of the lake surface, which was then divided up into 98-foot (30 m) squares, and used to guide a survey boat, which spent two days taking depth soundings using a multi-beam sonar. The collected data was then used to build up accurate details of the bottom surface of the reservoir, and to create a depth capacity chart. From this it would appear that the capacity of the reservoir continues to decrease, as a result of sedimentation. It was found to be 331 million imperial gallons (1,505 Ml), around 75 per cent of the calculated volume at the time of construction. These findings present British Waterways with the difficult decision as to whether the reservoir should be dredged or not.

== Location ==
The canal is owned and maintained by Canal and River Trust, the successor to British Waterways and is popular with local anglers, birdwatchers and walkers. The valve house, which controls the discharge of water from the dam to the canal and the Bosley Brook, is built of buff gritstone, with cyclopean stonework and a semi-circular entrance. It is the original structure built in 1831 and is grade II listed, as is the bridge with an elliptical horseshoe arch which carries the road across a stream at the eastern end of the dam.

== See also ==
- Canals of the United Kingdom
- History of the British canal system
- List of reservoirs and dams in the United Kingdom

== Bibliography ==
- Cumberlidge, Jane (2009). Inland Waterways of Great Britain (8th Ed.). Imray Laurie Norie and Wilson. ISBN 978-1-84623-010-3.
- Hadfield, Charles (1985). The Canals of the West Midlands. David and Charles. ISBN 0-7153-8644-1.
- Nicholson (2006). Nicholson Waterways Guide (Vol 5): North West and the Pennines. Harper Collins. ISBN 0-00-721113-9.
- Oxenham; Tunnicliffe (1978). A lake in the hills. Cheshire Conservation Trust. Archived from the original on 12 July 2013.
