= North Rode railway station =

Former railway station in Cheshire, England

North Rode
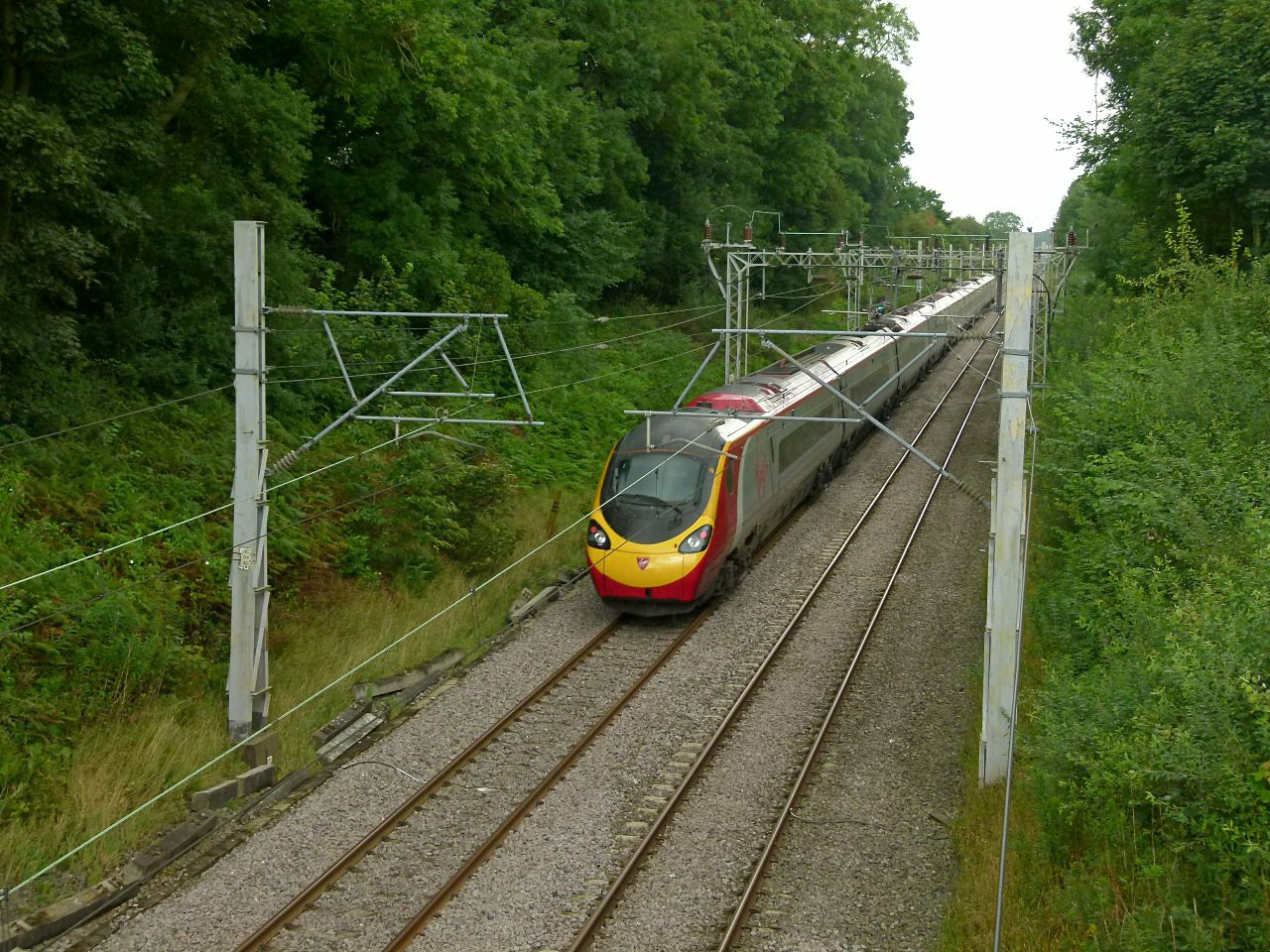
- Site of the station (2016)

General information
- Location: North Rode, Cheshire East; England
- Coordinates: 53.1987°N 2.1504°W
- Grid reference: SJ900668
- Platforms: 2

Other information
- Status: Disused

History
- Original company: North Staffordshire Railway
- Post-grouping: London, Midland and Scottish Railway, London Midland Region of British Railways

Key dates
- 18 June 1849: Opened
- 7 May 1962: Closed to all traffic
Location

North Rode railway station (originally North Rode junction) served the village of North Rode, in Cheshire, England.

== History ==
The station was opened by the North Staffordshire Railway (NSR) on 18 June 1849 and formed the junction of the Churnet Valley Line from the main NSR line between Stoke-on-Trent and Macclesfield.

The station was sited some distance from the village and traffic was sparse; however, it remained open until 1962 when it closed completely, although passenger traffic between North Rode and Leek had been withdrawn in 1960.

Preceding station	Historical railways	Following station
Macclesfield Central; Line and station open	North Staffordshire Railway; Stoke–Macclesfield	Congleton; Line and station open
Macclesfield Central; Line and station open	North Staffordshire Railway; Churnet Valley Line	Bosley; Line and station closed

== The site today ==
Trains continue to pass through the station site. There is now very little evidence of a once busy railway station, other than the remains of a milk churn chute on the steep western embankment.
