= Moorlands Sixth Form College =

Sixth form college in Staffordshire, England

Coordinates: 52.9794°N 1.9909°W

Painsley Sixth Form College
- Cheadle, Staffordshire; England

Information
- Type: Sixth Form College
- Motto: Know Yourself
- Religious affiliation: Roman Catholic
- Ofsted: Reports
- Senior Leader: A Dudley
- Gender: Mixed
- Age: 16 to 18
- Houses: PCC, TCA & MHS
- Associate Schools: Painsley Catholic College
- Website: http://www.moorlandscollege.co.uk

Painsley Sixth Form College is a Sixth Form College in Cheadle, a market town in Staffordshire, England. The college caters for years 12-13, where students can gain A-Level and AS-Level qualifications. The college is run as a partnership of three local high schools; Painsley Catholic College, and acts as the sixth form for students of all partnership schools.

== Links with Painsley Catholic College ==
Painsley Catholic College is a Roman Catholic secondary school with academy status in Cheadle, Staffordshire. Painsley is part of the Painsley Catholic multi-academy company consisting of the high school and six feeder primary schools. The teaching staff at the Moorlands VIth are from all three contributing high schools. The Moorlands VIth form campus is adjacent to Painsley Academy and students from the VIth form can use the Cheadle Schools sports hall facility based on the Cheadle High School Academy.

== Links with The Cheadle Academy ==
The Cheadle Academy is within a 5-minute walk from the sixth form & Painsley campus.

== Links with Moorside High School ==
Moorside High school is furthest away from the sixth form, in Werrington, on the borders of Stoke-On-Trent and provides a small number of teaching staff to the college.

== Alumni ==
- Adam Yates, professional footballer
- Gareth Owen, professional footballer
- Rachel Shenton, actress
- Adam Peaty, swimmer
- Levison Wood, explorer
