= General Heath =

General Heath may refer to:

- Charles Ernest Heath (1854–1936), British Army major general
- Henry Heath (British Army officer) (1860–1915), British Army major general
- Lewis Heath (1885–1954), British Indian Army lieutenant general
- William Heath (1737–1814), Continental Army major general

== See also ==
- Frederick Heath-Caldwell (1858–1945), British Army major general
