= St Giles' Catholic Church, Cheadle =

Church in Staffordshire, England

Coordinates: 52.9860°N 1.9890°W

St Giles' Church
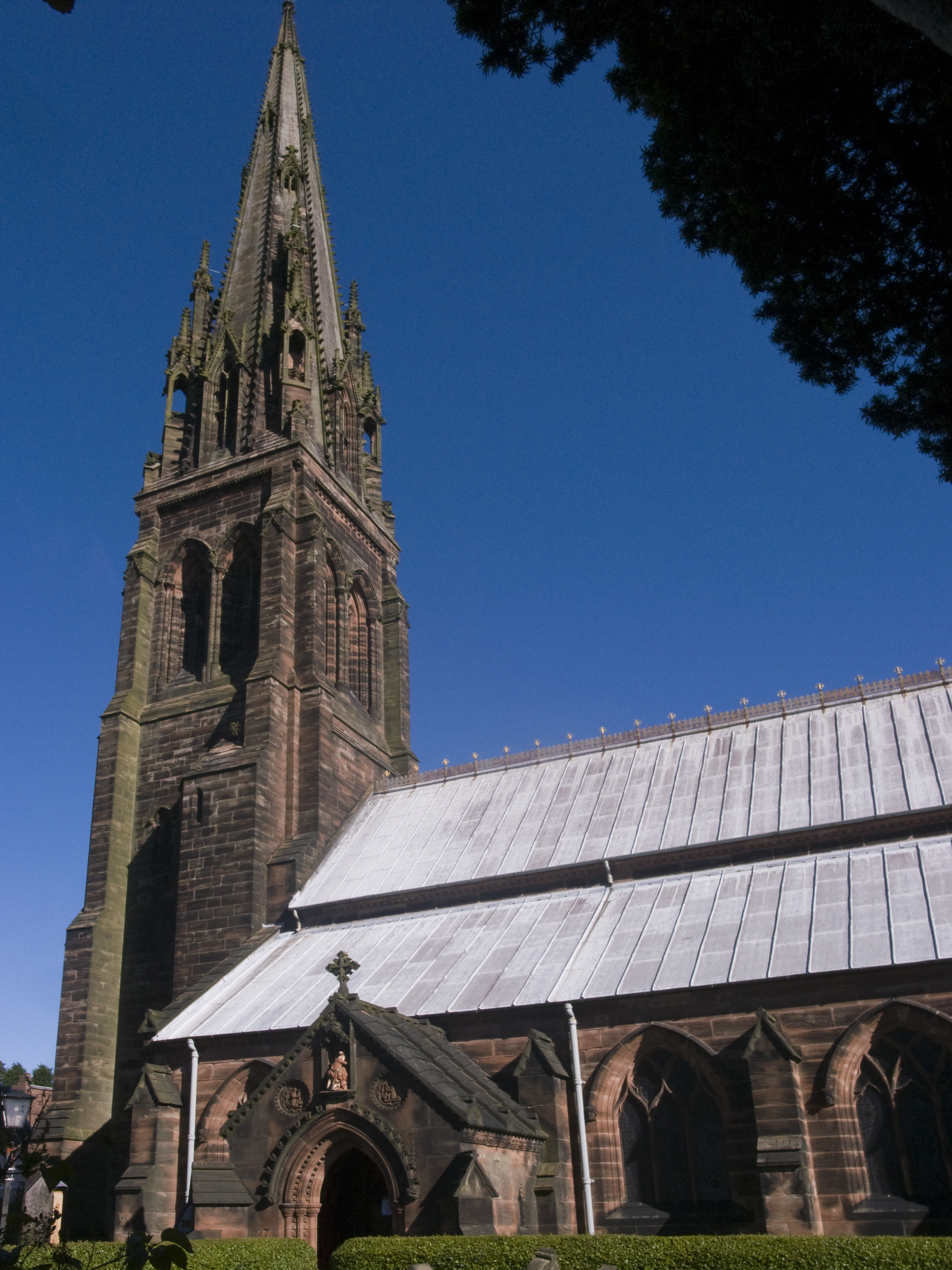
- St Giles' Church
- OS grid reference: SK 00836 43189
- Country: England
- Denomination: Catholic
- Website: www.stgilescheadle.org.uk

History
- Status: Active
- Consecrated: 31 August 1846

Architecture
- Functional status: Parish Church
- Heritage designation: Grade I
- Architect: Augustus Welby Northmore Pugin
- Style: Gothic Revival
- Years built: 1841-46

Administration
- Diocese: Birmingham
- Parish: St Giles, Cheadle

Clergy
- Priest: Fr.Eric Kemball

St Giles' Church is a Roman Catholic church in the town of Cheadle, Staffordshire, England. The Grade I listed Gothic Revival church was designed by Augustus Welby Northmore Pugin and built between 1841 and 1846, funded by the Catholic 16th Earl of Shrewsbury, John Talbot. It designed in a decorated and gothic revival style, typical of Pugin. The church is highly decorated on the outside and the inside, and has a tall steeple, the interior is painted throughout, and is floored with patterned tiles. Almost all the furniture and fittings were designed by Pugin, including the piscina, sedilia, a recess for an Easter Sepulchre, the reredos, font, font cover, pulpit, and screen. The spire is 200 feet (61 m) high and the church by far the tallest building in not just Cheadle, but all neighbouring towns, even eclipsing the Towers ruins at Alton Towers Resort in neighbouring Alton, also partially built by Pugin.

== History ==
=== Origins ===
The history of St Giles' begins with the establishment of a Catholic mission in Cheadle by Father William Wareing, a future Bishop of Northampton. He was an assistant to Thomas Baddeley at Cresswell, and in the early 1820s he opened a small chapel in a private house in Charles Street, Cheadle. Among those attending Mass there was Charles Talbot, 15th Earl of Shrewsbury, when he stayed at Alton Abbey without his chaplain. As Wareing's efforts bore fruit, the room became inadequate for the growing numbers, and Lord Shrewsbury asked him to look for larger premises. Eventually he obtained, on the Earl's behalf, a building about 60 feet (18 m) in length which had been built as an armoury for the local militia during the Napoleonic Wars, and the adjoining adjutant's house. This was converted into the new chapel, and the first resident priest was James Jeffries, appointed in 1827. In the same year the 15th Earl of Shrewsbury died and was succeeded by his nephew, John Talbot, as the 16th Earl. Earl John made Alton Abbey his principal residence and renamed it 'Alton Towers'.

The Earl was zealous in promoting the Catholic cause following the 1829 Emancipation Act, and it was he who first brought Pugin to north Staffordshire in the autumn of 1837, initially as an architect and interior designer at the Towers. Convinced that Pugin was the greatest acquisition the Church had made for some time, the Earl soon resolved that he would make financial contributions only to churches designed by Pugin and built under his supervision. As the Earl's architect, Pugin paid frequent, and sometimes lengthy visits, to Alton Towers - a convenient base from which to supervise progress on his various buildings in the Midlands.

St Giles' was vastly different in concept and design from the mean-looking chapels - such as the converted armoury in Cheadle - in which Catholics were accustomed to worship under the Toleration Act; different too from the fashionable city chapels such as that in Warwick Street, Soho (Church of Our Lady of the Assumption and St Gregory) where the Talbot family worshipped when in London. Both kinds were, according to Pugin, wholly unfit for their purpose.

=== Gathering ideas ===
At St Giles' Pugin was able to further develop ideas from the recently completed St Mary's Catholic Church, Uttoxeter, through the assistance of generous funding promised by Lord Shrewsbury.

The site for St Giles' was marked out by Pugin in 1841 and the church was aligned in such a way to obtain the best possible effect from the street. This meant modifying the traditional east–west alignment and placing the west end close to the frontage of Bank Street to allow the full height of the tower and spire to be seen from the junction of Cross Street and High Street, where the remains of the medieval market cross still stand.

Pugin also referred to St Giles' as "my consolation in all afflictions", and there is no doubt that the freedom from restrictions, the resources available to him at Cheadle and the enthusiastic support of Lord Shrewsbury, compensated somewhat for the professional and personal disappointments he encountered elsewhere. He had suffered under the constraints imposed by church-building committees, the indifference of many clergy to his dreams of a Gothic England and the death in 1844 of his second wife, Louisa.

That St Giles' increased in size and splendour as the work progressed was not just the result of Pugin's own enthusiasm for the project and his ability to prise additional sums of money from his patron. Lord Shrewsbury was himself committed to the promotion of the revived Gothic as a means of winning souls, and several of the alterations and additions at Cheadle were suggested by the earl himself.

The infinite care which Pugin took over St Giles' is reflected in his wide-ranging search for what he called "authorities" (medieval precedents), for what he proposed. In 1840 he made a tour of what he called "the very cream" of Norfolk churches, in the course of preparation of his designs for Cheadle, drawing details of mouldings, tracery patterns and canopy work. His sketchbook from the tour survives in the Victoria and Albert Museum. East Anglian porches were Pugin's source of inspiration for the stone-vaulted south porch of St Giles'. He studied surviving rood screens in Norfolk, and the one at Castle Acre appears to have been particular favoured in his preparations for the Cheadle screen.

Not all of Pugin's authorities were English, however. Gothic architecture was an international language with local and national dialects. On a visit to Antwerp in 1843 Pugin hoped to find "glorious details for the Cheadle windows" and "the most beautiful authorities for painted details at Cheadle above all". In May 1844 Pugin visited the recently restored Sainte-Chapelle in Île de la Cité, Paris, a richly decorated private chapel built for King Louis IX in the mid-thirteenth century.

=== Building ===
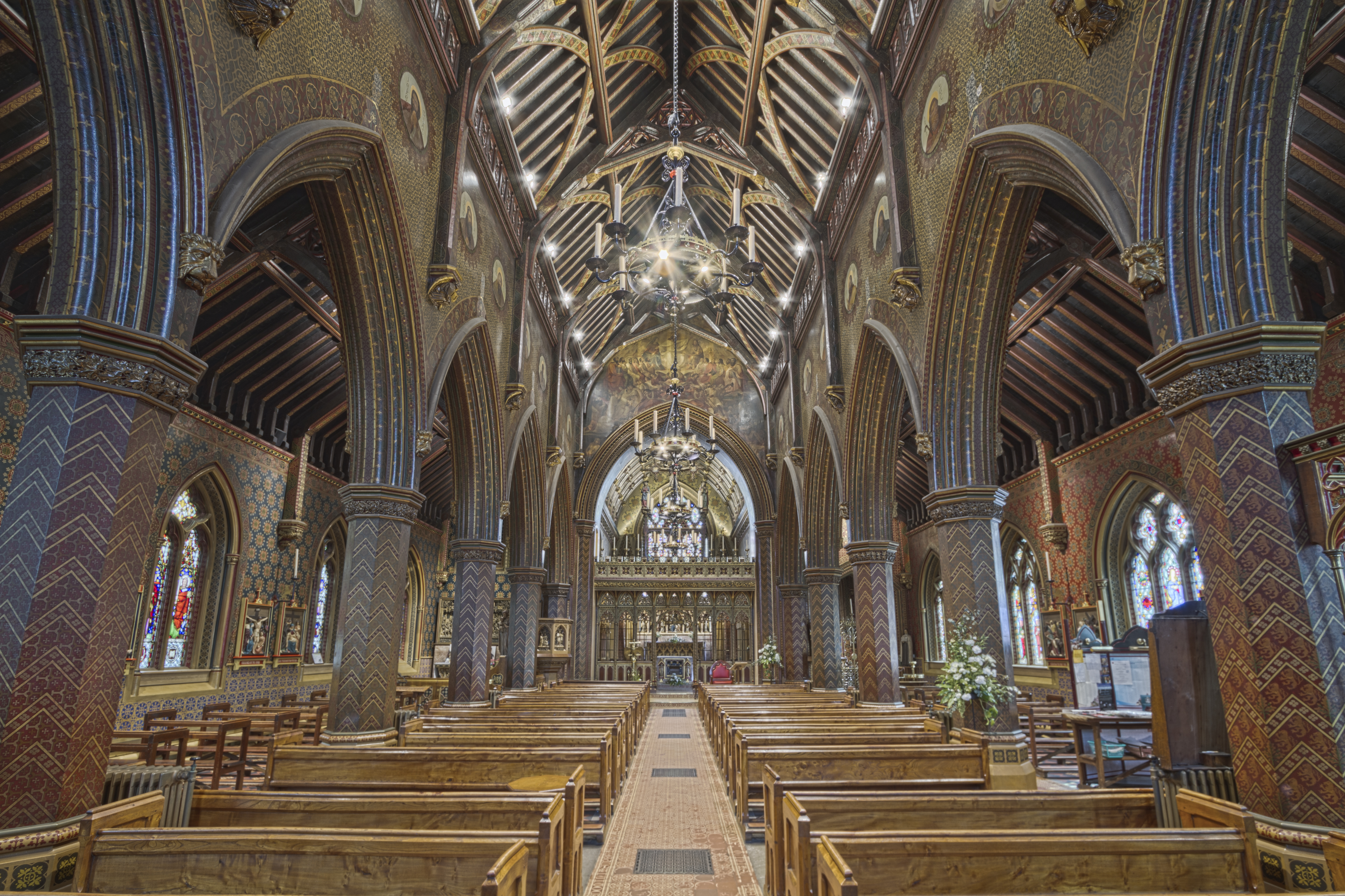
The nave

Great care was taken over the selection of the building materials, which came principally from local sources. There was an abundance of oak and elm on Lord Shrewsbury's Alton estate, and local quarries produced sandstones of various colours and textures. A new quarry for red and white sandstone was opened at Counslow Hill, between Cheadle and Alton, and from here came the stone for both St Giles' and for the complex of buildings which Pugin and the Earl of Shrewsbury were developing in Alton village, namely Alton Castle and the hospital of St John the Baptist.

It appears that Lord Shrewsbury himself suggested that alabaster should be used for the altars at Cheadle and St John's, Alton. It carved beautifully and took fine detail, and in pre-Reformation times had been used extensively for statuary and ornamental work. There were local alabaster mines at Fauld, near Tutbury, but instead of being quarried in blocks, the material was simply being blasted out before being ground up to make gypsum, the principal ingredient for plaster-of-Paris.

A north porch was added, the south aisle was extended eastwards to form the Blessed Sacrament Chapel, the Lady Chapel was moved over to the North aisle, and the proposed Chapel of St John was scrapped altogether. The sacristy was extended, and the "Rector's Door" on the south side of the chancel - planned originally to communicate with the priest's house - became superfluous when the location of the presbytery was moved north-east into Chapel Street.

It is a commonly held fallacy that the main functions of the nave and aisles of a church are to seat as many people as possible. That had certainly not been the case in medieval times, when the nave and aisles were regarded not as an auditorium filled with a static body of people in fixed seats, but as a liturgical space in which there was movement and drama (for example the festal processions on high days and holy days, and the penitential processions in Lent). Though benches were not uncommon in medieval times, fixed seating as a generality came about only after the Reformation, and the arrangements in early nineteenth-century Catholic chapels were little different from those of Nonconformist ones, with seating often running right across the width of the building, and with galleries to provide extra accommodation. Pugin would have no such "protestantisms" at Cheadle. When Lord Shrewsbury proposed to fill St Giles' with seats running the full width of the nave, without a central passage, Pugin reacted with characteristic indignation.

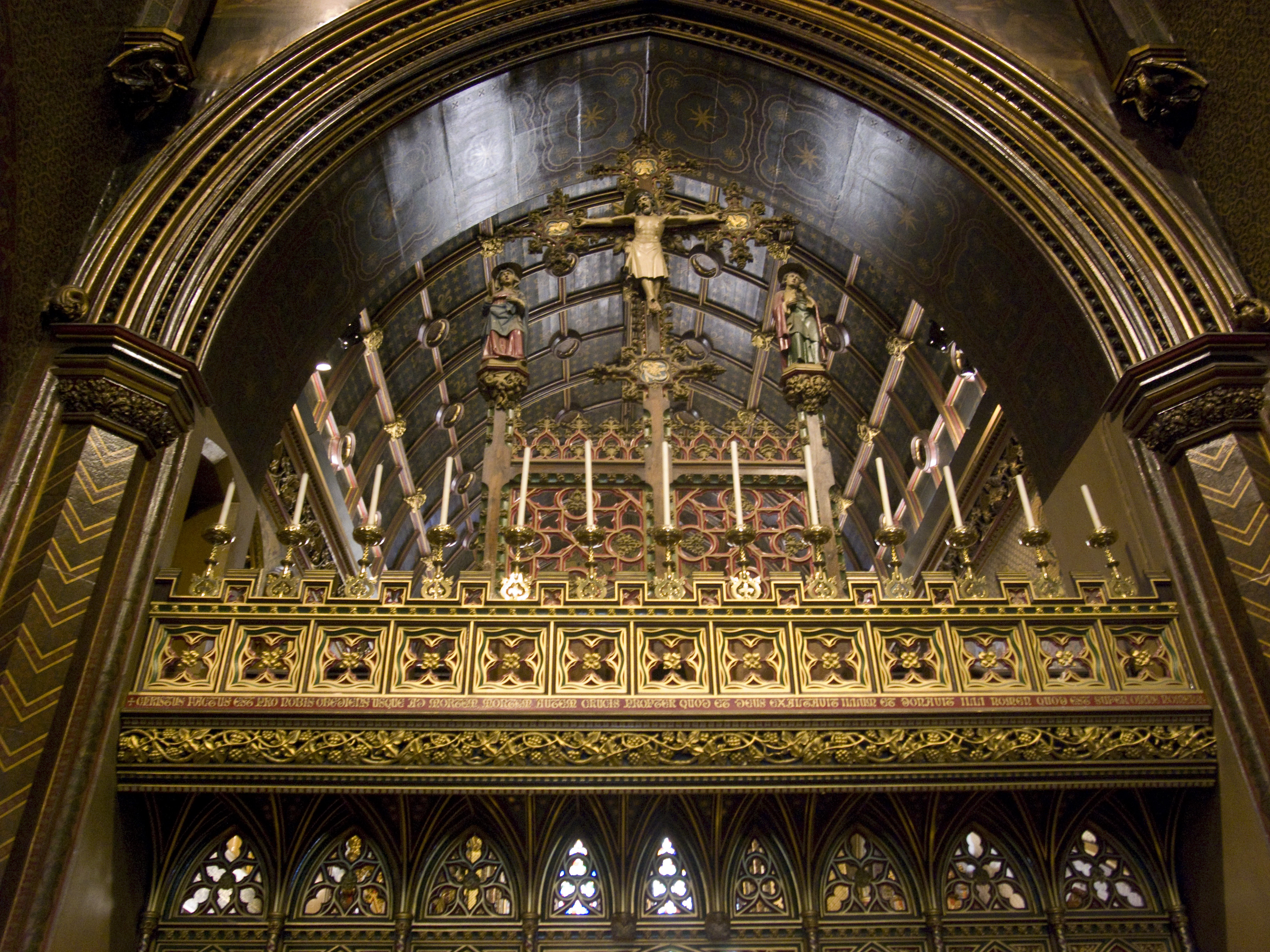
The rood screen

The care which Pugin took over the design of the rood screen for Cheadle and was passionate over the necessity of screens in general. The joiners began work in February 1842, and Pugin promised that it would be "the richest yet produced". All went well until, in order to cut costs, Lord Shrewsbury proposed to dispense with the services of an expert wood-carver. The screen could be finished instead by one of his own estate joiners, Thomas Harris, who had already produced carvings at Alton Towers' chapel and at St John's in Alton. Pugin responded in half-joking fashion, accusing the Earl of penny-pinching, and heading his letter with sketches of a rood screen and a block of cheese marked "2d 1/2" a pound. It is not known if the joiner returned.

=== Glazing and tiling ===
Pugin experienced great difficulty in finding stained-glass artists able to make windows to his complete satisfaction, and at the right price. The process involved the working-up of Pugin's drawings into full-sized cartoons, and the production of accurate colours by fusing various pigments onto the glass in a kiln at controlled temperatures. For the Cheadle windows he employed William Wailes of Newcastle-upon-Tyne. With the exception of the figure of St Giles' in the south aisle, which he had altered at his own expense, Pugin was generally pleased with Wailes's efforts, noting that some of his best craftsmen had gone to Normandy to make special studies of old-style glass.

Pugin believed that, after stained glass, encaustic tiles were amongst the most important forms of decorative art. By the winter of 1843 Pugin was able to tell Lord Shrewsbury that the tiles for Cheadle were proceeding well and that they would have "the finest floor in Europe"

The tiles for the chancel and the Chapel of the Blessed Sacrament were both rich and expensive. Lord Shrewsbury was concerned that they would be damaged by being constantly walked upon, so he suggested putting down carpets which, in Pugin's view, defeated the object of tiles at all. The Clerk of works, John Denny, suggested a solution: the priest and his assistants would be required to wear special cloth overshoes. Lord Shrewsbury warmed to the idea and told Pugin: "You may have your tiles and we shall want no carpet."

=== Consecration ===
The date for the consecration of St Giles was fixed originally for September 1845 but, with the various alterations, this proved to be overly optimistic. Pugin noted that the spire was topped on 27 June 1845, but the bells did not arrive until January 1846. The bell inscriptions, in Gothic lettering, included invocations of Our Lady, St Giles, St Chad and St Francis.

The consecration of the church was postponed for twelve months, but by March 1846 Pugin could not guarantee even that, unless Lord Shrewsbury would allow him to keep a full work-force including joiners and painters. Of particular concern were the great crucifix and carved figures for the roodscreen, which were being made by George Myers at Lambeth. The loss of the sculptor Thomas Roddis, who died in October 1845, was another sad blow, for although Roddis had completed his works at St Giles' by this time, his contribution to the building was substantial and of superb quality.

The consecration of St Giles' was spread over two days: Monday 31 August and Tuesday 1 September 1846. Pugin was much involved in the ceremonial preparations and also with practical arrangements for getting guests into the church. Cheadle was not served directly by rail with the nearest station being Stafford, and then transport by horse and carriage. The consecration on 31 August 1846 was essentially a private affair in which the building, its furnishings and ornaments were solemnly blessed by Bishop Wiseman, culminating in a High Mass. In the evening Lord Shrewsbury entertained a party of 54 distinguished guests to a dinner at Alton Towers. The more public part of the consecration took place the following morning - St Giles' Day - when spectators gathered from miles into the streets of Cheadle to witness sights and sounds not experienced since the Reformation: the procession of ten Catholic bishops and two archbishops in full pontifical robes.

=== Significance ===
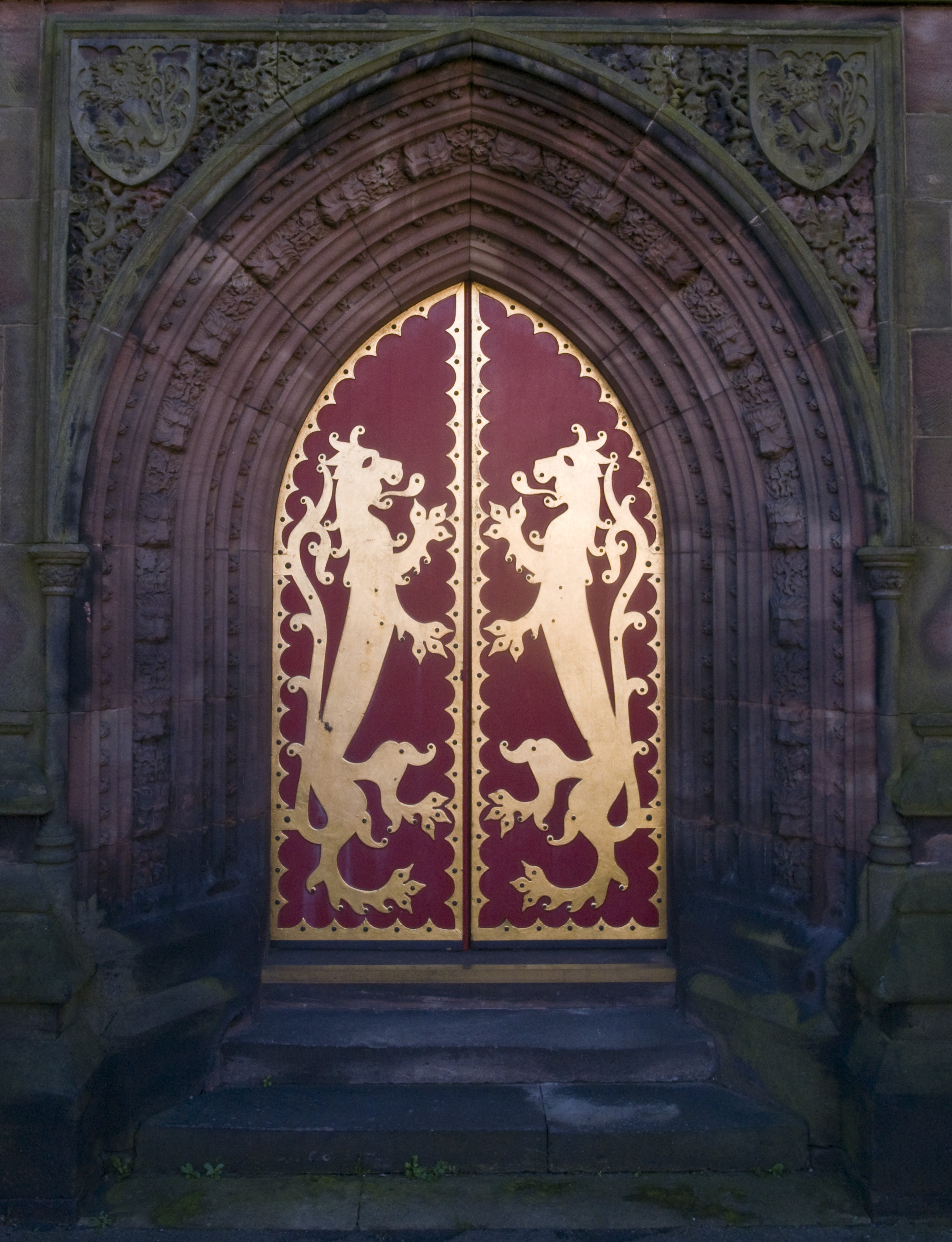
West door

The importance of St Giles' lies in the fact that everything about it is the product of one brilliant mind. Pugin understood all the principles of Gothic art and architecture and knew how to apply them. His busy schedule allowed time for daily Mass as well as morning and evening prayers at home, and he regarded himself first and foremost as a servant of the church as "a builder up of men's minds and ideas as well as material edifices". It is this which distinguishes Pugin as the principal architect of the Gothic Revival, and St Giles' as the perfect expression of what he believed an English church should be.

== Bell ringing ==
The bells of Cheadle ring to celebrate Mass weekly on either a Saturday evening (16:30-17:00) or Sunday morning (10:00-10:30). Practice takes place on a Tuesday evening.

== Gallery ==
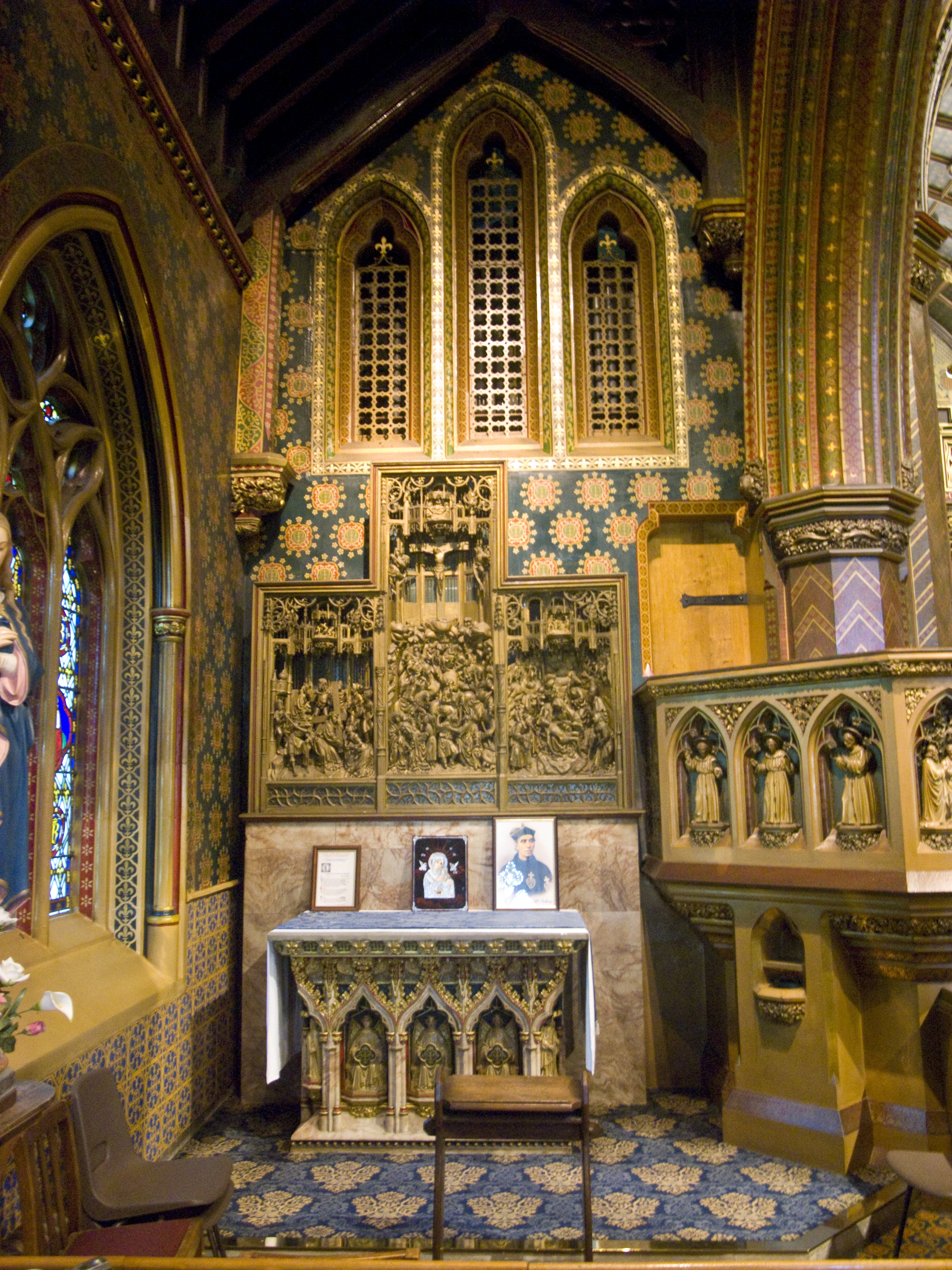
North East chapel

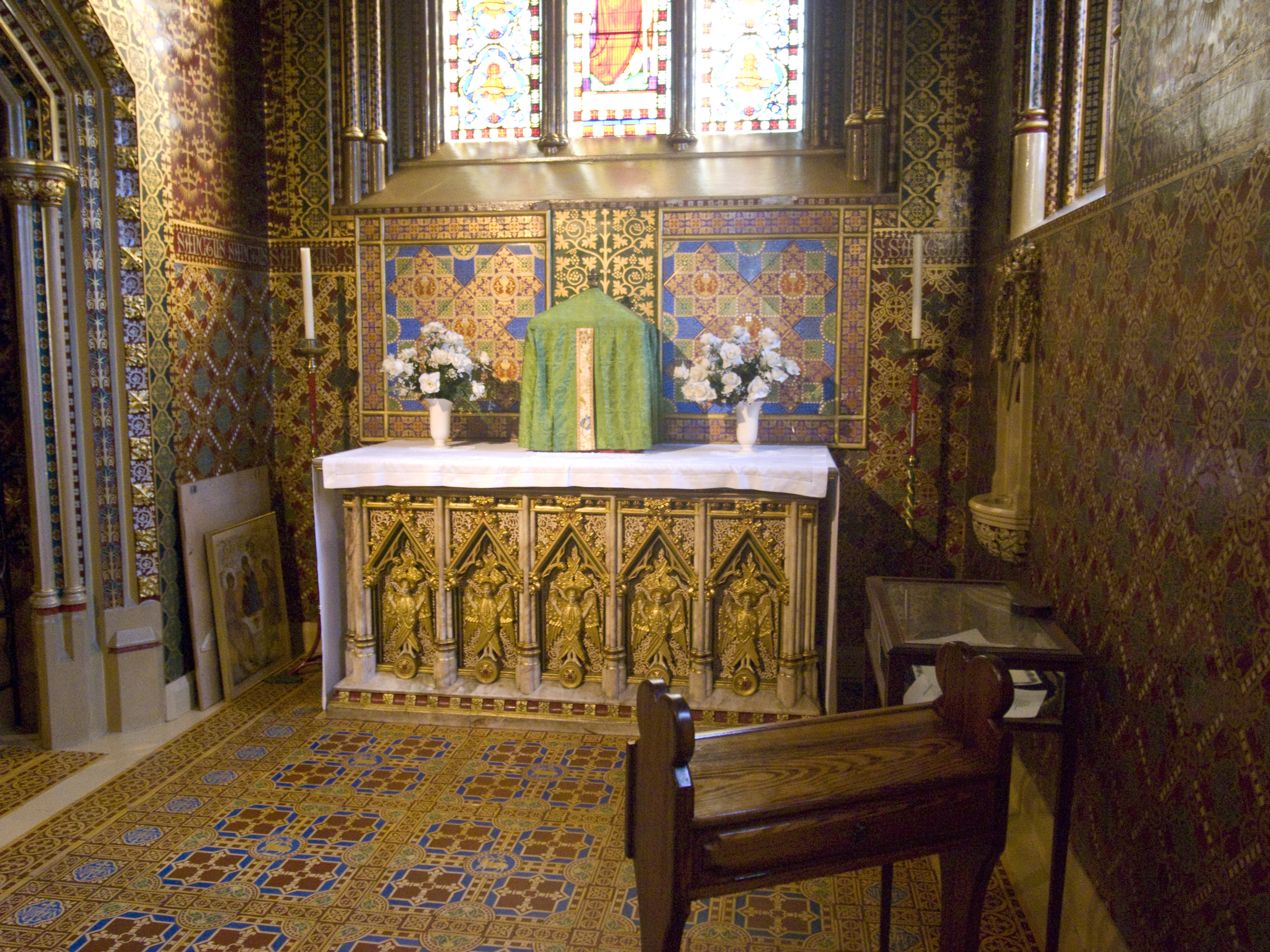
South East chapel

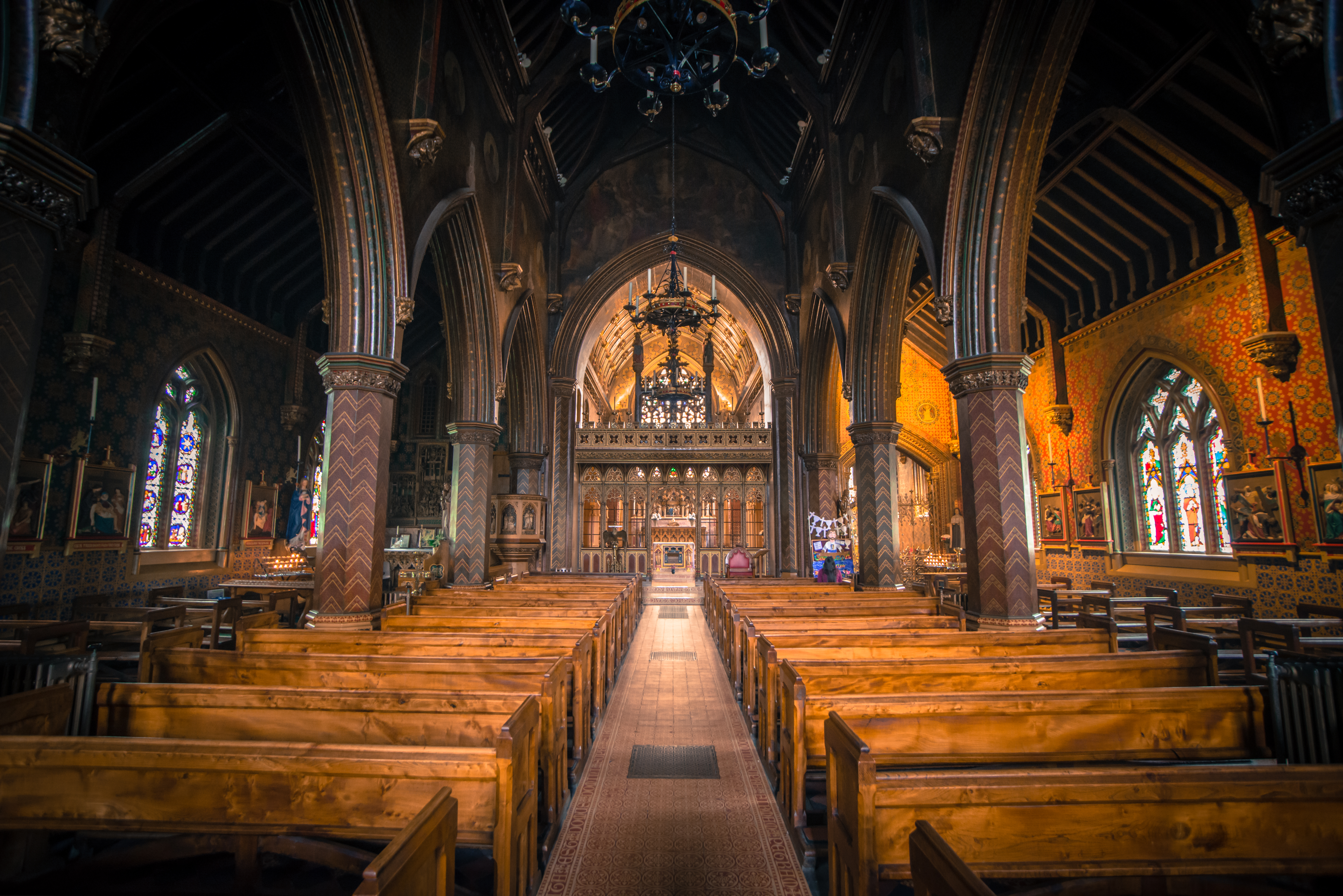
The nave

== See also ==
- List of Grade I listed buildings in Staffordshire
- Grade I listed churches in Staffordshire
- Listed buildings in Cheadle, Staffordshire
