= Osborne House, Cheadle =

Former municipal building in Cheadle, Staffordshire, England

Coordinates: 52.9886°N 1.9877°W

Osborne House, formerly Cheadle Town Hall, is a former municipal building in Leek Road in Cheadle, Staffordshire, a town in England. The building retains the façade of the former town hall but has been extensively redeveloped for residential use behind the façade.

== History ==
Following significant population growth, largely associated with the status of the Cheadle as a market town, a rural sanitary district was established in 1872. It was administered from the Cheadle Union Workhouse on Bank Street. In 1894, the rural sanitary district was succeeded by Cheadle Rural District Council. In anticipation of the change, and in the context of the need for a public events venue, civic leaders decided to commission a town hall. The site they selected was open land on the west side of Leek Road.

The building was designed in the Gothic Revival style, built in red brick and was officially opened by Lady Manningham Buller, whose seat was at Dilhorne Hall, on 5 November 1894. The design involved an asymmetrical main frontage of five bays facing onto Leek Road. The first bay on the left was fenestrated by a prominent bay window which was projected forward, with a mullioned and transomed window on the first floor. The third bay on the left originally contained an ornate portico containing an elliptically headed doorway with an archivolt flanked by hexagonal columns with castellated finials. The right-hand bay was fenestrated on the ground floor by a mullioned window surmounted by a pediment; there was another mullioned window on the first floor. The other bays were fenestrated by mullioned windows on both floors. The first and third bays were surmounted by stepped gables.

The newly formed parish council held its first meeting in the town hall around in late 1894. The Girls' Friendly Society and the local masonic lodge also met in the town hall. In March 1915, the town hall was acquired by the Osborne Theatre Company which converted into a cinema known as the Osborne Cinema. It also operated as a venue for concerts and other public events. Meanwhile, the rural district council established its own council offices further north along Leek Road, on the opposite side, in 1937.

The building continued to serve as a cinema and concert hall until the early 1970s, when it was converted into a nightclub, initially known initially as Ossies and later as Whispers, but that also closed in 1987. In March 1990, the building was severely damaged by arson. A proposal to restore the building as a heritage centre was unsuccessful, as was an attempt to get the building listed. In 1995, the main part of the building was demolished and replaced by a retirement complex of 15 flats. Much of the facade of the town hall was retained in the new development, which was named Osborne House to recall the name of the former cinema. As part of the redevelopment the portico was dismantled and the front of it was embedded into the right hand bay.
