= Listed buildings in Cheadle, Staffordshire =

Cheadle is a civil parish in the district of Staffordshire Moorlands, Staffordshire, England. It contains 77 listed buildings that are recorded in the National Heritage List for England. Of these, one is listed at Grade I, the highest of the three grades, two are at Grade II*, the middle grade, and the others are at Grade II, the lowest grade. The parish contains the town of Cheadle, and smaller settlements, including Freehay, and the surrounding countryside. Most of the listed buildings are houses and associated structures, cottages, shops and offices, the majority of which are within the town. The other listed buildings include churches, items in churchyards, public houses and hotels, a market cross, milestones and a milepost, a school, and a drinking fountain.

== Key ==
Grade	Criteria
I	Buildings of exceptional interest, sometimes considered to be internationally important
II*	Particularly important buildings of more than special interest
II	Buildings of national importance and special interest

== Buildings ==
Name and location	Photograph	Date	Notes	Grade
Mill House; 52.97862°N 1.97862°W	—	1635	The farmhouse is in red Hollington sandstone with dressings in white sandstone, a moulded eaves band, and verge parapets on corbelled kneelers with copings and ball finials on the apices. There are two storeys and an attic, a symmetrical front of three bays, a recessed wing on the left with one storey and an attic, and a rear wing. In the centre is a gabled porch and a doorway with a dated lintel, and the windows are mullioned and transomed, some with hood moulds. In the wing is a gabled dormer.	II*
73 High Street; 52.98638°N 1.99084°W		17th century	A house, later shops and living accommodation, the building was altered in the 19th and 20th centuries. It is in rendered brick with moulded eaves and a tile roof. There are two storeys, each shop has two bays, and there is a gabled rear wing. In the ground floor are two shop fronts with central recessed doorways. The upper floors contain sash windows, and in the rear wing is a four-light window with chamfered mullions.	II
77 and 79 High Street; 52.98629°N 1.99109°W		17th century	A house, later with added shops, the building was altered in the 19th century. The early parts are timber framed, the later parts are in rendered brick painted to resemble timber framing, and the roof is tiled. There are two storeys and an attic, and a front of five bays. To the left are two gabled dormers, and to the right is a larger gable. In the ground floor are two shop fronts, and between them is a doorway with a moulded surround and a semicircular hood. The windows are mullioned and transomed, and contain sashes.	II
Market Cross and plinth 52.98672°N 1.98995°W		17th century	The cross stands at a junction in High Street. It is in stone and has a roughly rectangular plinth with six steps. On it is a square cross shaft, chamfered as it rises to become an octagon, and with a pyramidal cap.	II
The Grange, Oakamoor Road; 52.99165°N 1.95913°W	—	17th century	The farmhouse was refaced in the 18th century and altered in 1873. It is in red brick with a tile roof, and has two storeys and an L-shaped plan. There are two bays and a projecting wing on a chamfered stone plinth. In the angle is a catslide roof over a doorway with an inscribed wedge lintel, and a fanlight. The windows are casements with segmental heads.	II
Thornbury Hall; 53.00445°N 1.96698°W		17th century	The hall was largely rebuilt and altered in the 19th century. It is in red brick on a plinth, and has a cornice, a blocking course, and a slate roof. There are three storeys, a front of four bays, and a lower wing to the right. The windows are sashes with wedge lintels and raised keystones, and the entrance is in the wing.	II
Hales Hall; 52.99369°N 1.96962°W	—	1712	A small country house, it was extended in the 19th century, and is in Baroque style. The house is built in red brick on a stone plinth, with stone dressings, quoins, a floor band, a projecting moulded dentilled cornice, and a hipped tile roof. There are two storeys and an attic, a double depth plan, and a front of five bays. The central doorway has pilasters, a frieze, and a swan-necked pediment with a coat of arms. The windows are sashes with moulded surrounds and raised keystones, and the window above the doorway has drapes of foliage, moulded consoles and an apron. There are three dormers with pediments and ball finials. Attached to the left of the house is a projecting single-storey billiard room.	II*
Grosvenor Memorial; 52.98622°N 1.99184°W		18th century	The memorial is in the churchyard of St Giles' Anglican Church, and is to the memory of Archibald Grosvenor. It is a chest tomb in stone, and has a moulded plinth, wide gadrooned pilasters at the angles, paired side panels with inscriptions, and a moulded top slab.	II
41 Bank Street; 52.98551°N 1.99122°W	—	18th century	A red brick house on a plinth that has a tile roof with stone-capped verge parapets. There are two storeys and three bays. The central doorway has a rectangular fanlight, and the windows are sashes. The doorway and windows have brick wedged heads and raised and painted keystones.	II
12 and 14 Cross Street; 52.98631°N 1.98970°W		18th century	A house, later a shop, it is in painted brick, with dentilled eaves, and a tile roof with verge parapets. There are three storeys and two wide bays. In the ground floor is a full-length shop front with a recessed doorway to the left. The upper floors contain casement windows with segmental heads.	II
64 High Street; 52.98683°N 1.99002°W		18th century	A shop in red brick with a moulded eaves band and a tile roof. There are three storeys and two bays. In the ground floor is a 19th-century shop front containing two three-sided bay windows with Ionic pilasters and columns, and a recessed doorway. The upper floors have sash windows with segmental heads and raised keystones.	II
67 and 69 High Street; 52.98652°N 1.99042°W		18th century	A house, later a pair of shops and living accommodation, in red brick, painted on the front, with a floor band, cogged eaves, and a tile roof. There are three storeys, and each shop has two bays. The ground floor contains two 20th-century shop fronts, in the upper floors the windows in the left shop are sashes, and in the right shop they are casements.	II
1 Watt Place; 52.98570°N 1.99171°W	—	18th century	The house is in roughcast brick, with a moulded eaves band and a tile roof. There are two storeys and two bays. The central doorway has a reeded surround, a fanlight, and a cornice. The windows are casements with segmental heads.	II
3 Watt Place; 52.98568°N 1.99176°W	—	18th century	A red brick house with dentilled eaves and a tile roof. There are two storeys and an attic, and two bays. The windows are casements; the doorway and the windows in the lower two floors have segmental heads.	II
Churchyard wall and steps 52.98615°N 1.99192°W		18th century (possible)	The wall runs along the south side of the churchyard of St Giles' Anglican Church. It is in stone and rises in two tiers with a footpath between. The upper level is coped, and in the centre is a wide flight of steps leading to the church.	II
Little Daisy Bank House, Leek Road; 52.98966°N 1.98768°W	—	Mid-18th century	The house, which was altered in the 19th century, is in rendered brick, with quoins, sill bands, a stone eaves band, and a tile roof with verge parapets. There are two storeys and three bays. The central doorway has pilasters and a cornice, and the outer bays contain two-storey canted bay windows with hipped roofs. The windows are sashes, and on the left gable end is a sundial dated 1856.	II
Milestone, Harewood; 52.99820°N 2.00124°W		Mid-18th century	The milestone is on the northeast side of the A522 road north of Cheadle. It is in stone with a rounded top, and has a cast iron plate with the distances to Leek and Cheadle. On the top is a benchmark.	II
Milestone, Leek Road; 52.98877°N 1.98718°W		Mid-18th century	The milestone is on the east side of Leek Road near its junction with Queen Street. It is in stone with a rounded top, and has a cast iron plate with the distances to Leek and Uttoxeter.	II
The Anchor Inn, Tean Road; 52.96156°N 1.99105°W		1757	The public house, which has been altered and extended, is in rendered brick, and has a dentilled eaves course and a tile roof. There are two storeys, two bays, and a later lower single-bay extension to the left. The doorway has a hood on consoles, and the windows are casements, those in the upper floor of the main block with segmental heads. On the upper storey of the right bay is a sign.	II
Copestake Memorial; 52.98649°N 1.99161°W		1760	The memorial is in the churchyard of St Giles' Anglican Church, and is to the memory of Joseph Copestake. It is a chest tomb in stone, and has a moulded plinth, fluted and gadrooned pilasters at the angles, incised sides, and a moulded top slab.	II
Old Workhouse; 52.98522°N 1.99175°W	—	1775	The former workhouse, later used for other purposes, is in brick with a first floor band, a moulded eaves course, and a hipped slate roof. There are two storeys and seven bays. The windows are sashes with painted wedge lintels, and the window in the place of the former doorway has a cornice on flat consoles.	II
23 Prince George Street; 52.98763°N 1.99073°W	—	Late 18th century	The house, which was altered in the 20th century, is in painted brick, with a dentilled eaves course, and a tile roof with coped verge parapets. There are two storeys and three bays. The central doorway has a pediment, the windows are casements with wedge lintels and raised keystones, and in the roof is an inserted flat-roofer dormer.	II
8 and 10 The Terrace; 52.98614°N 1.99282°W	—	Late 18th century	A pair of red brick houses with a dentilled eaves band, and a tile roof with a continuous ridge. Each house has one bay. No. 8, on the right, has three storeys, a doorway to the right with a reeded surround and a hood, and casement windows, those in the lower two storeys with segmental heads. No. 10 is slightly recessed and has two storeys and an attic, casement windows with painted wedge lintels, and a doorway to the right.	II
Convent of St. Joseph; 52.98603°N 1.98971°W		Late 18th century	Originally a house, it was altered and extended in about 1845 by A. W. N. Pugin. It is in red brick with stone dressings and tile roofs, and forms a U-shaped plan with front to the street and to the churchyard of St Giles' Church. The original house has two storeys and an attic, and a front of two bays containing sash windows with painted wedge lintels, and two gabled dormers. Attached to the left of the house is a long single-storey wing added by Pugin. It contains a Tudor arched doorway, and in the gale end is a two-light window. At the rear, Pugin also added a two-storey four-bay range attached to the former house by a tall tower with a saddleback roof.	II
Hall Memorial; 52.98635°N 1.99195°W		Late 18th century	The memorial is in the churchyard of St Giles' Anglican Church, and is to the memory of Michael Hall. It is a chest tomb in stone, and has a plinth, fluted and gadrooned pilasters at the angles, low relief carvings of urns in the end panels, and a roll-moulded top slab.	II
Mobberley House, Tean Road; 52.97202°N 1.99008°W	—	Late 18th century	The farmhouse is in red brick with a tile roof. It has three storeys, two parallel ranges, and three bays. The central doorway has pilasters, a fanlight, and an open pediment, and the windows are casements with gauged brick heads.	II
Sundial; 52.98670°N 1.99266°W		Late 18th century (probable)	The sundial is in the churchyard of St Giles' Anglican Church. It is in stone, and consists of a baluster-shaped shaft on a circular plinth. The dial is missing.	II
The Ship Inn, Tean Road; 52.96284°N 1.99077°W		Late 18th century	A private house, later a public house, it is in painted brick with a dentilled eaves course and a tile roof. There are three storeys, three bays, and a single-storey extension to the left. The central doorway has a rectangular fanlight and a pediment. The windows are sashes with wedge lintels, and above the door is a large crested wrought iron sign bracket.	II
The Wheatsheaf Hotel, 53 High Street; 52.98679°N 1.98970°W		Late 18th or early 19th century	The hotel is in rendered stone and has a tile roof. There are three storeys, three bays, and a rear wing. On the front is a doorway that has a Tuscan porch with a moulded cornice and a frieze, and above it is a large wrought iron inn sign bracket. The windows are sashes, and in the rear wing is a large bow window.	II
Atkinson Memorial; 52.98670°N 1.99238°W		1818	The memorial is in the churchyard of St Giles' Anglican Church, and is to the memory of Joseph Atkinson. It is a pedestal tomb in stone, and has a moulded base, inscriptions on the sides, a reeded surbase, and a gadrooned urn finial.	II
1–6 The Square; 52.98723°N 1.99020°W		1819	A terrace of six shops in red brick on a stepped plinth, with a moulded eaves band and a slate roof. There are three storeys and ten bays. In the ground floor are shop fronts with bow windows, and doorways with round or flat heads, and the upper floor contains sash windows with stone wedge lintels.	II
2, 4 and 6 Cross Street; 52.98655°N 1.98992°W		Early 19th century	A row of three shops and a house, in red brick, Nos. 2 and 4 rendered, with a hipped slate roof. There are four bays, Nos. 2 and 4 have three storeys, and No. 6 has four. In the ground floor, from the left are a shop front with a cornice on consoles, a segmental-headed entry, a casement window and a doorway with pilasters and a hood, and another shop front, with pilasters and a cornice. The upper floors contain sash windows with painted wedge lintels.	II
3 Cross Street; 52.98660°N 1.98972°W		Early 19th century	A red brick shop with a tile roof, three storeys and three bays. In the ground floor is a 20th-century shop front with recessed entrances, and the upper floors contain sash windows with painted wedge lintels.	II
5–7 Cross Street; 52.98654°N 1.98966°W		Early 19th century	A house, later a shop, it is in red brick with three storeys and three bays. In the ground floor is a shop front with a cornice on consoles, a shop window, and to the right a doorway with a fanlight. In the left bay is a tripartite sash window and a casement window above, and the other bays contain sash windows, all with painted wedge lintels.	II
11, 13 and 15 Cross Street and archway 52.98643°N 1.98954°W		Early 19th century	A row of three shops with an elliptical archway to the left, in red brick with a tile roof, three storeys and four bays. In the ground floor are three shop fronts, each consisting of a small-paned shop window and a doorway to the left with a moulded surround and a hood. Above the archway is an oriel window, and the other windows are sash windows with painted wedge lintels.	II
19 and 21 High Street; 52.98769°N 1.98847°W		Early 19th century	A pair of shops with living accommodation in roughcast brick, with moulded eaves and a tile roof. There are three storeys, three bays, and a two-storey single-bay extension on the right. The ground floor contains shop fronts and to the right is a doorway with a moulded surround. In the upper floors are sash windows in moulded surrounds.	II
29 High Street; 52.98749°N 1.98888°W		Early 19th century	A shop in red brick with stone dressings, rusticated quoins, a dentilled eaves course, and a tile roof. There are three storeys and two bays. In the ground floor is a shop front with a cornice on moulded consoles and a recessed entrance. The upper floors contain sash windows with rusticated lintels, those in the middle floor with moulded keystones.	II
47 High Street; 52.98702°N 1.98931°W		Early 19th century	A house, later a shop, it is in red brick with painted stone dressings, a moulded eaves band, and a hipped slate roof. There are three storeys and three bays. In the ground floor is a 20th-century shop front that has a central round-headed doorway with pilasters and a pediment. The windows in the upper floors are sashes with painted wedge lintels.	II
51 High Street; 52.98685°N 1.98946°W		Early 19th century	A house, at one time a police station, it is in stone, and has floor bands, a top pediment, and a slate roof. There are three storeys and three bays. In the centre the doorway has a Tuscan surround and a fanlight, and it is flanked by Venetian windows. The upper floors contain sash windows, in the middle floor they have cornices, the windows in the outer bays are tripartite, and the windows in the top floor are square.	II
55 High Street; 52.98663°N 1.98995°W		Early 19th century	A shop in painted rendered brick with a slate roof. There are three storeys and one bay. In the ground floor is a 20th-century shop front with a central entrance and a cornice, and the upper floors contain sash windows.	II
62 High Street; 52.98683°N 1.98995°W		Early 19th century	A shop in rendered brick with moulded eaves and a tile roof. There are three storeys and two bays. In the ground floor is a 20th-century shop front, and the upper floors contain sash windows.	II
75 High Street; 52.98633°N 1.99091°W	—	Early 19th century	A red brick shop with moulded eaves and a hipped tile roof. There are three storeys and two bays. In the ground floor is a 20th-century shop front with a recessed doorway and a cornice, and the upper floors contain sash windows with wedge lintels.	II
67 Tape Street; 52.98564°N 1.98545°W	—	Early 19th century	A red brick house with a dentilled eaves course and a tile roof. There are three storeys and two bays. The doorway to the right has a moulded surround, and the windows are sashes; the doorway and windows have painted wedge lintels.	II
68 and 70 Tape Street; 52.98463°N 1.98571°W	—	Early 19th century	A pair of houses with a dentilled eaves course and a tile roof. They have three storeys, and each house has one bay. The doorways have moulded surrounds, the doorway on the left with a gabled porch. The windows are sashes with painted wedge lintels.	II
2 The Terrace; 52.98626°N 1.99237°W	—	Early 19th century	A red brick house with a dentilled eaves course and a tile roof. There are three storeys and two bays. The windows are casements. The doorway and the windows in the lower two floors have painted wedge lintels.	II
Former Black Horse Public House, Tape Street; 52.98824°N 1.98735°W		Early 19th century	The former public house is in painted rendered brick, with a moulded eaves band, and a tile roof. There are two storeys and three bays. The round[headed doorway has a fanlight, and the windows are tripartite sashes, those in the upper floor with segmental heads.	II
Broad Haye Farmhouse; 53.00175°N 1.98007°W	—	Early 19th century	The farmhouse is in painted brick with a dentilled eaves course and a tile roof. There are three storeys and three bays. The central doorway has a fanlight and a segmental head, and the windows are casements, those in the lower two floors with segmental heads.	II
Daisy Bank House, Leek Road; 52.98977°N 1.98761°W	—	Early 19th century	A house, later used for other purposes, it is in rendered brick with a moulded eaves band and a slate roof. There are two storeys and three bays. The doorway has pilasters, a radial fanlight and an open pediment. To its left is a large canted bay window, and the other windows are sashes.	II
Stables and coach house, Hales Hall; 52.99398°N 1.96965°W	—	Early 19th century	The stables and coach house are in red brick with a cogged eaves course and a tile roof. There are two storeys, and a T-shaped plan that has a projection to the right with a hipped roof. The building contains a carriage entrance with an elliptical head, a stable entry and a stable window, both with segmental heads, and casement windows.	II
Harewood Hall; 53.00019°N 2.00220°W	—	Early 19th century	A large farmhouse in red brick, it has a cornice and a slate roof. There are three storeys, two parallel ranges, and a front of five bays. In the centre is a Tuscan porch flanked by stone canted bay windows. The windows have wedge lintels; originally all were sashes, and some have been replaced by casements.	II
Hazlewall Farmhouse; 53.01132°N 2.01561°W	—	Early 19th century	A red brick farmhouse with a hipped tile roof, three storeys and three bays. The central doorway has a hood, and the windows are casements with wedge lintels and raised moulded keystones.	II
Jeffreys Memorial; 52.98642°N 1.99230°W		Early 19th century	The memorial is in the churchyard of St Giles' Anglican Church, and is to the memory of John Jeffreys. It is a chest tomb in stone, and has reeded pilasters at the angles, an oval-bordered inscription, and a moulded top slab.	II
Leafields Farmhouse; 53.00751°N 2.01116°W	—	Early 19th century	A red brick farmhouse with a slate roof, two storeys, and a front of five bays. The central doorway has a hood on consoles, and the windows are sashes with wedge lintels.	II
Light Oaks Farmhouse; 52.96800°N 1.93573°W	—	Early 19th century	The farmhouse is in red Hollington sandstone, with a moulded and dentilled eaves course, and a tile roof. There are two storeys and an attic, a T-shaped plan, and a front of three bays. The doorway has a fanlight, and the windows are casements.	II
Stables, Lightoaks Farm; 52.96827°N 1.93515°W	—	Early 19th century	The stables are in red Hollington sandstone, with a chamfered eaves band, and a tile front. There are two storeys, a long front, and extensions at both ends. The building contains five stable doors, five openings above, and two windows.	II
Parkfields; 52.99443°N 1.96706°W	—	Early 19th century	The farmhouse is in red brick with a pantile roof, two storeys, and five bays. The central doorway has a fanlight with a lozenge pattern and a hood on brackets. The windows have wedge lintels; most are sashes and some have been replaced by casements.	II
Royal Oak Hotel, 71 High Street; 52.98643°N 1.99067°W		Early 19th century	The hotel is in red brick with dentilled eaves and a tile roof. There are three storeys and three bays. In the centre is a Tuscan porch, and a round-headed doorway with a fanlight. The windows are sashes with wedge lintels and raised keystones; the windows in the outer bays are tripartite. On the front is a large crested wrought iron inn sign.	II
The Eaves, Eaves Lane; 52.97350°N 1.98517°W	—	Early 19th century	A farmhouse in rendered brick, with a painted cornice and a tile roof. There are two storeys, two parallel ranges, and a symmetrical front of five bays. The central doorway has pilasters, a frieze, and a hood, and the windows are sashes with segmental heads.	II
The Manor, Watt Place; 52.98592°N 1.99214°W		Early 19th century	A rectory in red brick with cogged eaves and a hipped tile roof. There are three storeys and three bays. The doorway has a moulded surround and a gabled hood, and the windows are casements with painted wedge lintels and raised keystones.	II
The Swan Inn; 52.98538°N 1.99587°W		c. 1830	The public house is in rendered brick, with a dentilled eaves course, and a tile roof. There are two storeys and four bays. The doorway has a fanlight, the windows are sashes with painted lintels, and on the front is a large wrought iron inn sign bracket.	II
Tollgate House, Tean Road; 52.96768°N 1.99138°W		c. 1830	The former toll house is in rendered brick, and has a hipped roof. There are two storeys, a front of two bays, and an octagon set into the left side of the house. The windows are casements with wedge lintels.	II
1 Cross Street; 52.98670°N 1.98983°W	—	Early to mid-19th century	A shop on a corner site, it is in red brick, the ground floor with banded rendering, a dentilled cornice, and a hipped slate roof. It has three storeys, three bays on Cross Street, two on High Street, and a chamfered corner between them. There are two doorways with fanlights, one on Cross Street, and the other on the corner. In the ground floor are plate glass windows, and in the upper floors are sash windows with segmental heads and painted wedge lintels.	II
4 The Terrace; 52.98618°N 1.99254°W	—	Early to mid-19th century	The house is in red brick with diapering, cogged eaves, and a tiled roof. There are two storeys and two bays. The doorway in the left bay has a Tuscan surround and a fanlight, and the windows are sashes with painted wedge lintels.	II
The Croft, Prince George Street; 52.98849°N 1.98876°W		Early to mid-19th century	A red brick house with sill bands, a cornice, and a tile roof. There are two storeys and a symmetrical front of three bays, the middle bay projecting slightly. In the centre is a projecting porch with columns and a pediment, and the windows are sashes with painted wedge lintels.	II
St Giles' Anglican Church; 52.98693°N 1.99258°W		1837–39	The church, designed by J. P. Pritchett, is in sandstone with a tile roof. It consists of a nave, north and south aisles, a chancel, and a west tower embraced by the aisles. The tower has four stages, diagonal buttresses, a west window with a pointed head, and an embattled parapet with angle pinnacles. The parapets of the aisles are also embattled, and the east window has four lights.	II
St Giles' Catholic Church; 52.98599°N 1.98909°W		1841–46	A Roman Catholic church designed by A. W. N. Pugin in Decorated style, it is built in red Hollington sandstone, and has a lead roof with cast iron cresting. The church consists of a nave, north and south aisles, a chancel, a chapel, a north vestry, and a west steeple. The steeple has a tower of four stages, with angle buttresses containing niches, a west doorway, a pointed west window, and an octagonal spire with pinnacles and lucarnes.	I
Cross, St Giles' Church; 52.98608°N 1.98933°W		1841–46	The cross in the churchyard was designed by A. W. N. Pugin, and is in red Hollington sandstone. It has a square four-tiered, stepped plinth, a surbase with niches and crests, a square shaft with crocketed angles, and a crucifix with a hood and flanked by figures.	II
Wall, gates and gateways, St Giles' Church; 52.98625°N 1.98889°W	—	1841–46	Designed by A. W. N. Pugin, the walls enclose the churchyard to the north. They are in red Hollington sandstone, and have steep coping and roll-moulding to the apices. Each of the two gateways has a fleuron eaves band on corbels, and a hipped roof with a cross finial. The gates are in wrought iron.	II
St Giles' School; 52.98568°N 1.98885°W		1841–46	A Roman Catholic primary school designed by A. W. N. Pugin, it is in red brick with stone dressings, and has a tile roof with a crested ridge and verge parapets. There are two storeys, and six bays divided by buttresses, and the windows have trefoil heads. At the right end is a bell tower with a pyramidal two-stage roof, and between the school and the tower is an entrance bay with a catslide roof to the right.	II
St Chad's Church, Freehay; 52.96758°N 1.97292°W		1842–43	The church was designed by Scott and Moffatt in Early English style, and is built in white sandstone with a tile roof. It consists of a single cell, and has a small gabled west porch with a pointed entrance, and a bellcote on the west gable. Most of the windows are lancets, at the east end are three lancets with trefoil heads, and there is a circular window in the west gable end.	II
School and school house, Freehay; 52.96790°N 1.97309°W	—	1846	The school and school house were designed by Scott and Moffatt, and are built in white sandstone with a tile roof. The school has a cruciform plan with a projecting gable. In the gable is a mullioned and transomed window, and the other windows are lancets. On the roof is a timber framed bellcote with a flèche. The schoolhouse is attached to the rear, it has two storeys, a projecting gable, and a Tudor arched entrance.	II
Counslow Lodge; 52.98220°N 1.95361°W	—	c. 1850	The lodge, which is part of the Alton Towers estate, is built in red Hollington sandstone, and has a tile roof with verge parapets and crested finials. There are two storeys, and a T-shaped plan. To the left of the entrance front is a gabled bay on a plinth, with mullioned windows, and a quatrefoil panel in the apex. To the right is a single-storey recessed wing containing a Tudor arched doorway.	II
Gazebo west of Parklands; 52.99436°N 1.96738°W	—	Mid-19th century	The gazebo is in red brick and has a pyramidal roof of scalloped tiles with lead roll ridges. There is a single storey and a polygonal plan. The windows are two-light casements with Gothic-arched lights, and the doorway is on the north side.	II
The Lodge, Prince George Street; 52.98877°N 1.98827°W		Mid-19th century	The lodge is circular, in red brick with a conical tile roof, and has one storey, and a circular plan. The doorway has a round arch and a fanlight, and the windows are round-arched casements.	II
Woodhead Hall; 53.00055°N 1.96447°W	—	1873	A country house, later extended and used for other purposes, it is in red brick with stone dressings, on a plinth, with string courses, a moulded modillioned cornice, and a hipped slate roof. There are two storeys and a cellar, a double-depth plan, and a front of six bays, the middle two bays projecting under a pediment containing an inscribed oval plaque. Steps lead up to a central doorway that has columns, a balustraded balcony on brackets, and side lights. In the ground floor are bay windows with plasters, colonettes and balustrades. The upper floor contains sash windows with moulded architraves, and there are more bay windows on the other fronts.	II
Drinking fountain 52.98606°N 1.99189°W		1879	The drinking fountain stands at a road junction. It is in stone and has a stepped circular plinth, and two stages with a triangular plan.The lower stage contains round-headed niches containing gadrooned bowls. At the angles are granite pilasters with urn cappings. The base of the upper stage is a dome, above which is a moulded frieze and dentilled pediments, over which is another dome with an urn finial. In the upper stage are inscribed plaques.	II
Milepost at SJ 973471; 53.02138°N 2.04143°W		Early 20th century (probable)	The milepost is on the south side of the A52 road. It is in cast iron, and has a triangular plan and a sloping top. On the top is inscribed "CONSALL" and on the sides are the distances to Hanley, Leek, Stoke, Newcastle, Froghall, Cheadle, Ashbourne, and Stafford.	II
