= Woodhead Hall =

Country house in Cheadle, Staffordshire, England

Coordinates: 53.0006°N 1.9644°W

Woodhead Hall is a country house at Cheadle in Staffordshire. It is a Grade II listed building.

== History ==
Woodhead Hall was originally commissioned by a Mr Leigh and completed in 1720. It was acquired by William Allen, a merchant, in the 1840s and completely rebuilt by William Shepherd Allen to the designs of William Sugden in 1873. It remained in the Allen family, passing to William Allen in 1915, until it became a preparatory school in 1925. At the start of the Second World War it became RAF Cheadle and, as a Y-station, started monitoring important enemy signals information. The main task was to intercept messages from German bombers and ground stations.

The hall continued as a monitoring station during the Cold War, with operations transferring to become part of Government Communications Headquarters (GCHQ) in January 1964 when all ministries' civilian interception sites came under its control. GCHQ Cheadle continued to monitor Soviet communications. The station closed in 1995 and the property was sold into private ownership in 1997.
