= Levison Wood =

English Explorer, Author and Film Maker (born 1982)

Major Levison Wood FRSA FRGS FRSGS VR
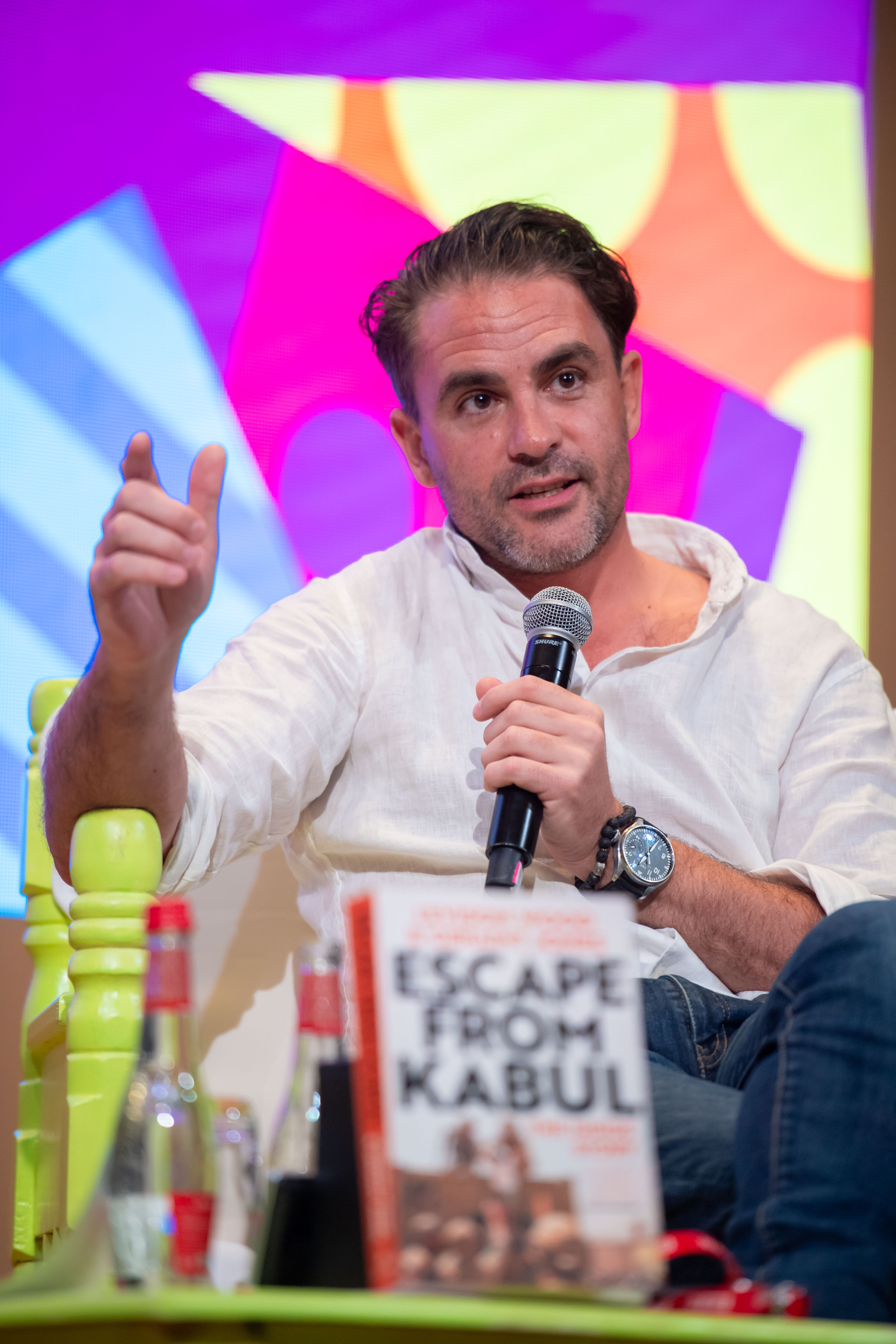
- Wood at Emirates Airline Festival of Literature 2024.
- Born: 5 May 1982 (age 44); Hartshill, Stoke-on-Trent, England
- Occupations: Military officer, explorer, photographer and journalist
- Military career
- Allegiance: United Kingdom
- Branch: British Army
- Service years: 2005–2010, 2012–2023
- Rank: Major
- Service number: 564688
- Units: Parachute Regiment; 77th Brigade
- Conflicts: War in Afghanistan: Operation Herrick
- Website: www.levisonwood.com

Levison James Wood FRSA FRGS FRSGS VR, (born 5 May 1982) is an English explorer, writer, photographer and documentary-maker known for his long-form walking expeditions and his work highlighting environmental issues, Indigenous communities, and human stories from remote regions of the world. He has produced numerous books and television documentaries covering subjects ranging from conservation in the Amazon to following the migration of Elephants across Botswana. Levison is Chancellor at Staffordshire University, a UNICEF UK Ambassador, and WWF Ambassador.

== Overland expeditions ==
Beginning in December 2013, over the course of nine months, he undertook the first ever expedition to walk the entire length of the river Nile from the Nyungwe Forest in Rwanda. The expedition was inspired by the explorers John Hanning Speke, Richard Francis Burton, David Livingstone and Henry Morton Stanley. Wood was accompanied by numerous guides, journalists (including Matthew Power), and friends along the different stages of the route. The expedition was commissioned into a four part television programme for Channel 4 that aired in January 2015, and Wood detailed the trip in his book Walking the Nile. Power died during the programme from severe heat stroke. Wood was forced to abandon a 450-mile (720 km) section in South Sudan due to heavy fighting caused by civil war.

In 2015, Wood embarked a walk spanning the length of the Himalayas from Afghanistan to Bhutan, filming a documentary series and writing another book about the experience, which was published in January 2016.

In September 2017, he began a full circumnavigation of the Arabian Peninsula: travelling from Syria, through Iraq, the Gulf, crossing part of the Empty Quarter desert in Oman, traversing Yemen, Saudi Arabia, Jordan and Israel to finish in Lebanon; an expedition totalling 5,000 miles (8,000 km). During the course of the journey, he was embedded with Iraqi troops fighting ISIS where he witnessed the liberation of Sharqat and also encountered Palestinian guerrillas and Hezbollah operatives. He visited the city of Palmyra which was then under Russian control. This journey was documented in the Discovery series Arabia With Levison Wood.

Channel 4 broadcast Walking the Americas from January 2017, featuring an expedition from Mexico to Colombia. The channel then broadcast his journey along the Caucasus in the four-episode series From Russia to Iran: Crossing Wild Frontiers.

In May 2020, Channel 4 commenced broadcasting Walking with Elephants, where Levison followed the 650-mile migration of elephants across Botswana.

In August 2023, Levison presented Levison Wood: Walking with...; a three-part wildlife documentary series that aired on Channel 4.

== Bibliography ==
- 2015 – Walking the Nile
- 2016 – Walking the Himalayas: An Adventure of Survival and Endurance
- 2017 – Eastern Horizons: Hitchhiking the Silk Road
- 2017 – Walking the Americas
- 2018 – Arabia: A Journey Through The Heart of the Middle East
- 2019 – Incredible Journeys: Discovery, Adventure, Danger, Endurance ISBN 9781526360434
- 2020 - The Last Giants
- 2020 - Encounters: A Photographic Journey
- 2021 - The Art of Exploration
- 2022 - Endurance
- 2023 - Escape from Kabul
- 2025 - The Great Tree Story

== Life ==
The son of teachers Levison Wood and Janice, née Curzon, Wood was born on 5 May 1982 at the North Staffordshire Royal Infirmary in Hartshill, Staffordshire. He grew up in nearby Forsbrook and was educated at Painsley Catholic College, before obtaining an honours degree in history at the University of Nottingham. He was commissioned as an officer into the Parachute Regiment on 13 April 2006 where he spent four years, serving in Afghanistan in Helmand, Kandahar and Zabul. Wood was promoted to Captain on 13 October 2008.

He left the army in April 2010, took up a career in writing and photography, and has become a bestselling author. He has extensive experience in travel and exploration in over 100 countries and in 2011 was made a Fellow of the Royal Geographical Society. He is an elected Fellow of the Explorers Club in New York, Fellow of the Royal Society of Arts, a visiting Fellow of The Business School and holds honorary doctorates at Staffordshire University and The University of Nottingham.

Wood acts as a patron and ambassador for a number of charities including UNICEF, the Tusk Trust, The Glacier Trust, the ABF The Soldiers' Charity and The Gurkha Welfare Trust. He rejoined the army in 2012, serving as a reservist Major in the 77th Brigade.

In March 2024 Wood was appointed as Chancellor of Staffordshire University, taking up the position on the 1st May.

== Awards ==
=== Military Awards & Decorations ===
Operational Service Medal for Afghanistan with Afghanistan clasp
Queen Elizabeth II Diamond Jubilee Medal
Volunteer Reserves Service Medal
Army Achievement Medal (US Army award)

=== Literary Awards ===
Walking the Himalayas was voted "Adventure Travel Book of the Year" for 2016 at the Edward Stanford Travel Writing Awards.

Wood was awarded an Honorary Doctorate by Staffordshire University in 2017 in recognition of his work as an explorer, writer and photographer.
