= The Cheadle Academy =

Location
- Station Road; Cheadle, Stoke-on-Trent, Staffordshire, ST10 1LH; England
- Coordinates: 52.9816°N 1.99°W

Information
- Type: Academy
- Motto: Feliciter Promovender "Promoting Success"
- Established: 1970
- Department for Education URN: 136959 Tables
- Ofsted: Reports
- Principal: Nicola Slack
- Staff: 71
- Gender: Coeducational
- Age: 11 to 18
- Enrolment: 800
- Houses: Tenacity, Integrity, Unity
- Colour: Blue
- Website: http://www.thecheadleacademy.co.uk/

The Cheadle Academy (formerly Cheadle High School) is a coeducational secondary school with academy status located in Cheadle, Staffordshire in the Midlands area of England.

It has around 790 pupils ranging from Year 7 to 13. The Cheadle Academy has its own sixth form provision that opened in September 2017.

The Cheadle Academy is a specialist arts school. It offers a broad curriculum base, offering students the chance to study a wide range of subjects. Students in Year 10 and Year 11 can choose from subjects such as Health and Social Care, BTEC Sport, Business Studies, ICT, Geography and History.

The proportion of students achieving 9-5 grades in Maths was 67% and in English Language the proportion of students achieving 9-5 was 68%. In English Literature this was 98%. Overall the proportion of pupils who were entered for 5 or more GCSE, and achieved 5 or more 9-5 grades, was 61%. Similarly, the pass rate for Grade 5 or more 9-5 including English and Maths was 58%.

== History ==
The school was formed by the merging of Cheadle Grammar School and Mackenzie Secondary Modern. In 1975 the two schools being adjacent to each other, but separated by what is now Painsley Catholic College. There is now a sixth form college on site - The Cheadle Sixth Form

== Curriculum ==
The Cheadle Academy teaches Science, Maths, English, Languages, Religious Education, Business Studies, Information Communication Technology, Health and Social Care, Sport, Geography, History, Art, Technology, Physical Education and, Music.

== Radio ==
The Cheadle Academy hosts its own fully licensed high school radio station which features shows produced by pupils and staff, representing local interests of all stakeholders. The station is popular with both pupils and members of the local area, who can listen online via the online player.

Listeners are encouraged to take part in the show via text message (cheadle + message to 07786 206955).

== School productions ==
The school produces many musical and drama productions. Some of the more recent productions have included; Back to the 80s and Grease.
