= Charles Heath (British Army officer) =

British Army general

Major-General Sir Charles Heath KCB CVO
- Born: 20 September 1854; Cheadle, Staffordshire, England
- Died: 23 October 1936 (aged 82)
- Allegiance: United Kingdom
- Branch: British Army
- Service years: 1873–1917
- Rank: Major-General
- Commands: Director of Quarterings and Deputy Quartermaster General
- Education: Marlborough College

Major-General Sir Charles Ernest Heath KCB CVO (20 September 1854 – 23 October 1936) was a senior British Army officer.

Heath was born in Cheadle, Staffordshire, the son of Rev. Charles Harbord Heath, rector of Bucknall cum Bagnall, and Mary Anne Heath.

Heath was commissioned into the Duke of Cornwall's Light Infantry in 1873. In 1890 he transferred to the Army Service Corps. In November 1895 he was promoted to lieutenant colonel.

Between 1905 and 1907 he was in charge of administration at Aldershot Garrison, before serving as Director of Transport and Remounts at Army Headquarters and the War Office from 1907 to 1911. Heath, who in March 1907 was promoted to major general, was made Companion of the Order of the Bath (CB) in the 1911 Coronation Honours, and he was elevated to Knight Commander in the 1916 Birthday Honours. In August 1914 he was given a temporary appointment as a director at the War Office.

He died in 1936.

He married Eleanor Russell, daughter of John Russell of County Limerick, in 1854. They had three daughters and one son before she died in 1915. Their only son, Hugh Lester Heath, drowned in Canada in 1914 on the RMS Empress of Ireland. He married Mabel Frances, daughter of Colonel Frederick N. Miles, of the Bengal Staff Corps in 1916. His second wife died in 1933.
