= Cheadle, Staffordshire =

Town in Staffordshire, England

Coordinates: 52.9849°N 1.9865°W

Cheadle
- Town and Civil Parish
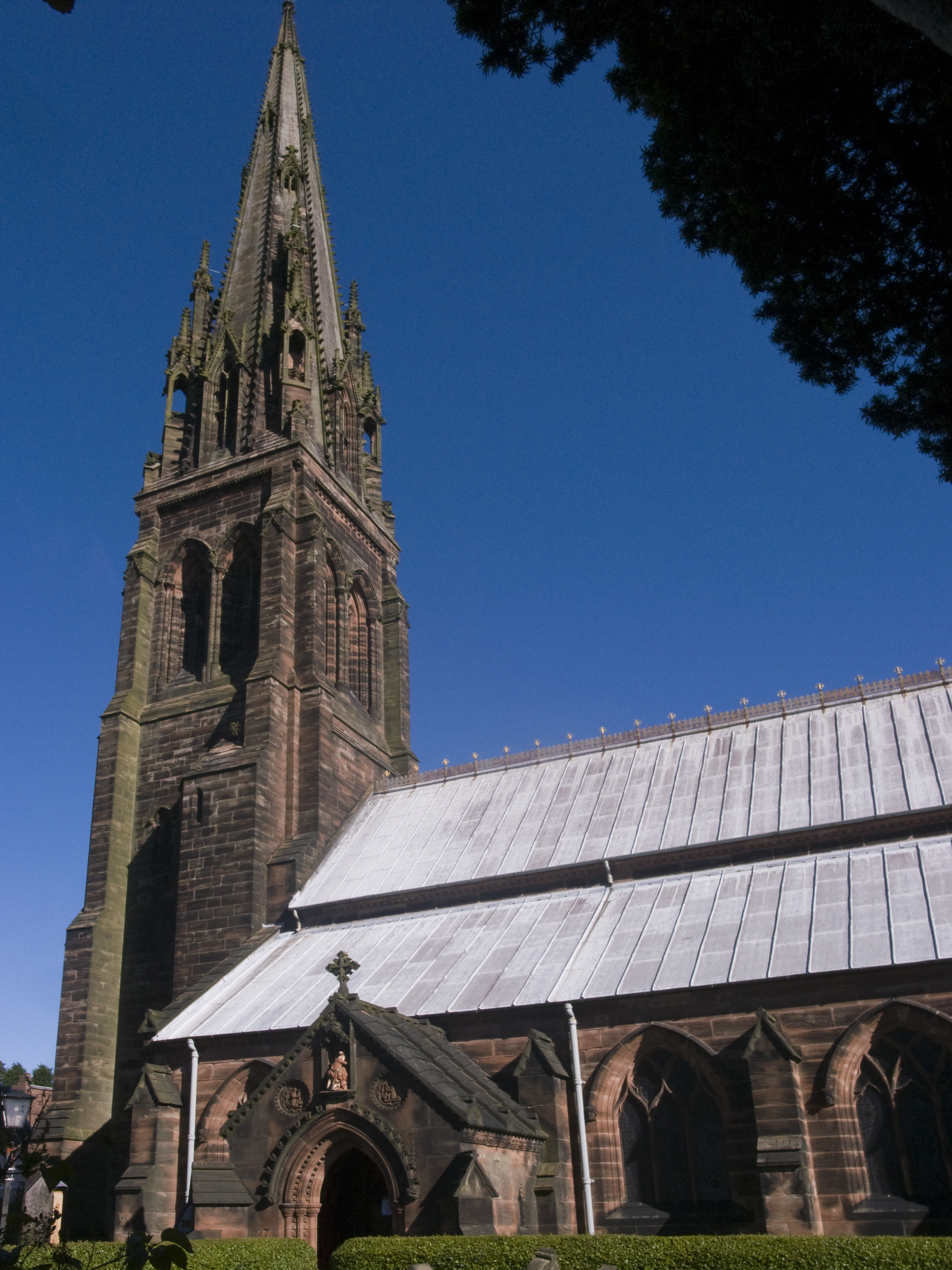
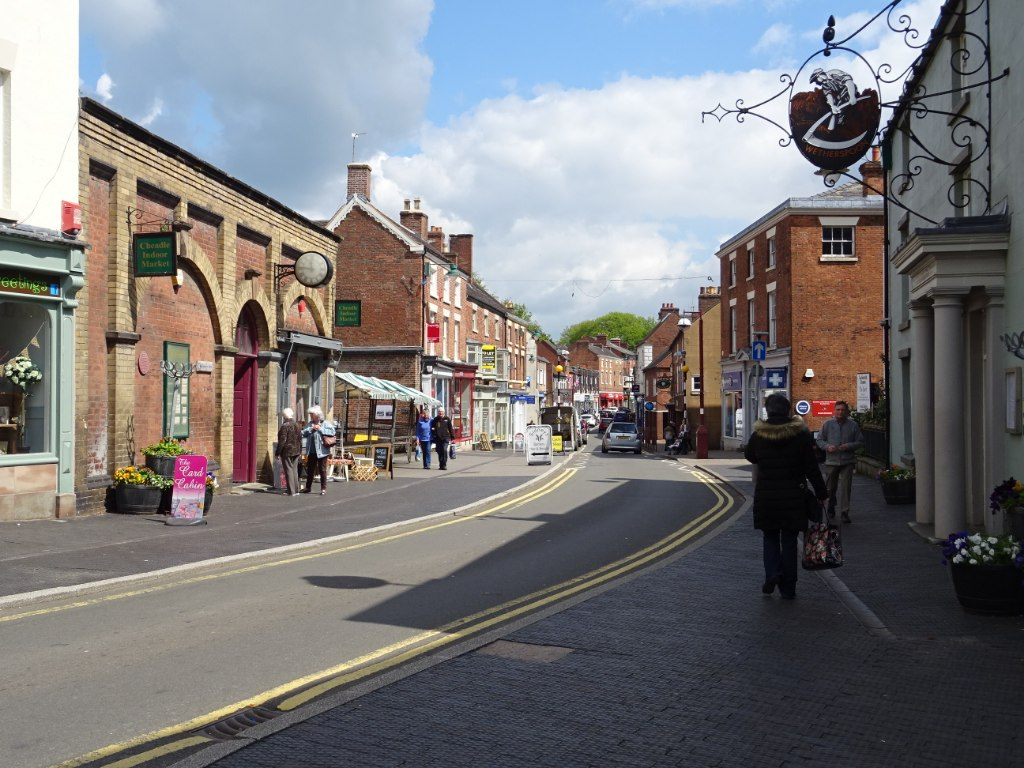
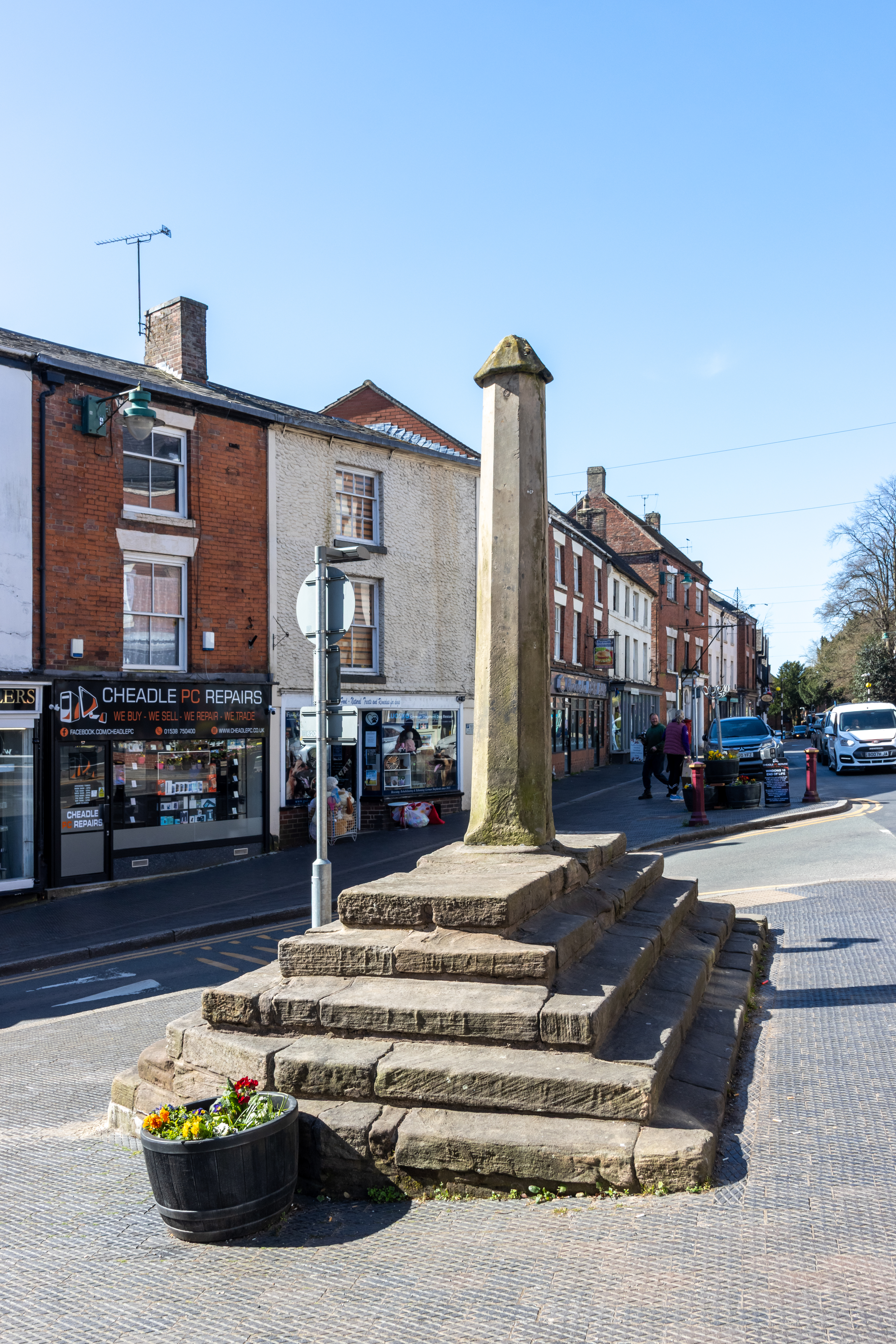
- St Giles' Catholic Church High Street Market Cross

- Location within Staffordshire
- Population: 12,165 (2011 census)
- OS grid reference: SK010431
- Civil parish: Cheadle
- District: Staffordshire Moorlands
- Shire county: Staffordshire
- Region: West Midlands
- Country: England
- Sovereign state: United Kingdom
- Suburbs of the town: List: Brookhouses; Mobberley; Rakeway; Woodhead
- Post town: Stoke-on-Trent
- Postcode district: ST10
- Dialling code: 01538
- Police: Staffordshire
- Fire: Staffordshire
- Ambulance: West Midlands
- UK Parliament: Staffordshire Moorlands

Cheadle is a market town and civil parish in the Staffordshire Moorlands District of Staffordshire, England. It is located between Uttoxeter, Leek, Ashbourne and Stoke-on-Trent. Dating back to Anglo-Saxon times, it lies within the historic Staffordshire Hundred of Totmonslow. In 2011 the parish had a population of 12,165.

== Etymology ==
Cheadle is first attested in the Domesday Book of 1086, in the forms Celle and Cedla. The first part of the name comes from the Common Brittonic word which survives in modern Welsh as coed ("woodland"), and was thus once a place-name meaning "wood". As Old English became the dominant language in the area, this place-name became the basis for a new one through the addition of the Old English word lēah ("clearing in woodland"), which thus meant "cleared land at Ced".

== History ==
Cheadle appears in Domesday Book as held by the lord of the manor, Robert of Stafford, at the time the area covered 6 miles by 3 miles and listed 9 families. In 1176 the Basset family acquired the manor of "Chedle" and in 1250 Ralph Basset was granted a market charter and annual fair by King Henry III.

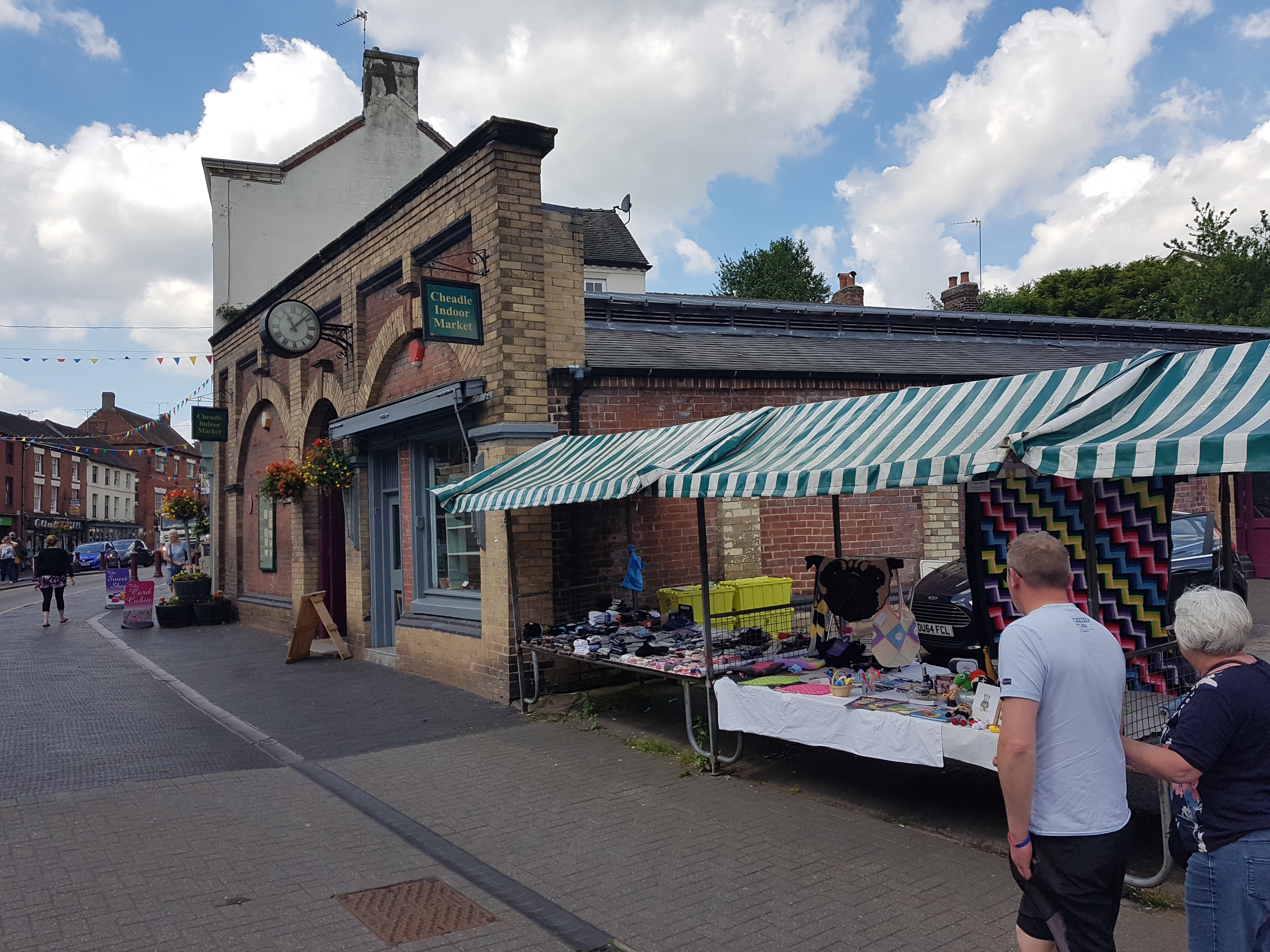
Cheadle Market 2019

In 1309, 75 families are recorded as using a corn-grinding mill sited near Mill Road. Fifty years later, a new church was built in the village replacing a 12th-century structure and this church remained in use until 1837.

In 1606 a school was founded by the church, and in 1685 the then curate of the parish, Rev, Henry Stubbs, left an endowment to found a grammar school in Cheadle. The school was built at Monkhouse (behind the High Street) and was active until 1917. The endowment continues to this day. The Monkhouse is currently home to 3rd Cheadle Scout Group.

By 1676 Cheadle's population is recorded as just over one thousand, and a hundred years later (1772) as one thousand eight hundred. At this time the main source of employment was agriculture and farming. During the same period a new workhouse was built and opened. It was extended under the Cheadle Union in 1837. Part of the original building was demolished in 1909, renamed an infirmary. The whole complex was demolished in 1987 and a new hospital was built on the site, which was opened in 1989 by Princess Anne.

In 1798, 10 weavers houses were built. The weavers lived downstairs and the looms for the manufacture of tape were upstairs. By the 1820s the looms were transferred into a factory in Tape Street. This tape factory closed in 1972, and is now a shop. In 1851 silk and narrow fabric mills were built in Cheadle. They employed hundreds of operatives, and closed in 1981.

In the Brookhouses area of Cheadle in 1725, the Cheadle Brass and Copper Company started production, transferring to the Oakamoor area 100 years later under the company name Thomas Patten. It was bought in 1851 by Thomas Bolton of Birmingham. In 1890 Bolton's opened a factory at Froghall and the Oakamoor works were eventually closed in 1963.

St Giles' Catholic Church opened in 1846. Its 200 feet (61 m) spire still dominates the town today. It was built by Augustus Welby Northmore Pugin, who was commissioned by John Talbot, 16th Earl of Shrewsbury to create a church that "would have no rival". To achieve his aim, Talbot gave Pugin unlimited resources with which to build it. The church is more commonly known as 'Pugin's Gem', and is the centre of a local tourist event known as 'Discover the Secret'. Cheadle Town Hall was completed in 1894.

At the turn of the 20th century the first open air swimming baths were constructed at Brookhouses, and telephone installation began in 1904. In 1901 Cheadle was linked to the railway network by the Cheadle Railway, operated and later owned by the North Staffordshire Railway, with the building of a railway station at Majors Barn, giving access to further industries and movement of passengers. At a later period sand, gravel and aggregates used for building purposes were transported from the station as well as coal.

The first motor car arrived in Cheadle in 1903, and the first licensed omnibus service – Cheadle to Longton – commenced in January 1914.

One of the British Signals Intelligence Y-stations called RAF Cheadle was situated at Woodhead Hall, from land purchased by the Air Ministry playing a vital role in helping intercept German Luftwaffe radio communications during the Second World War.

== Places of interest ==
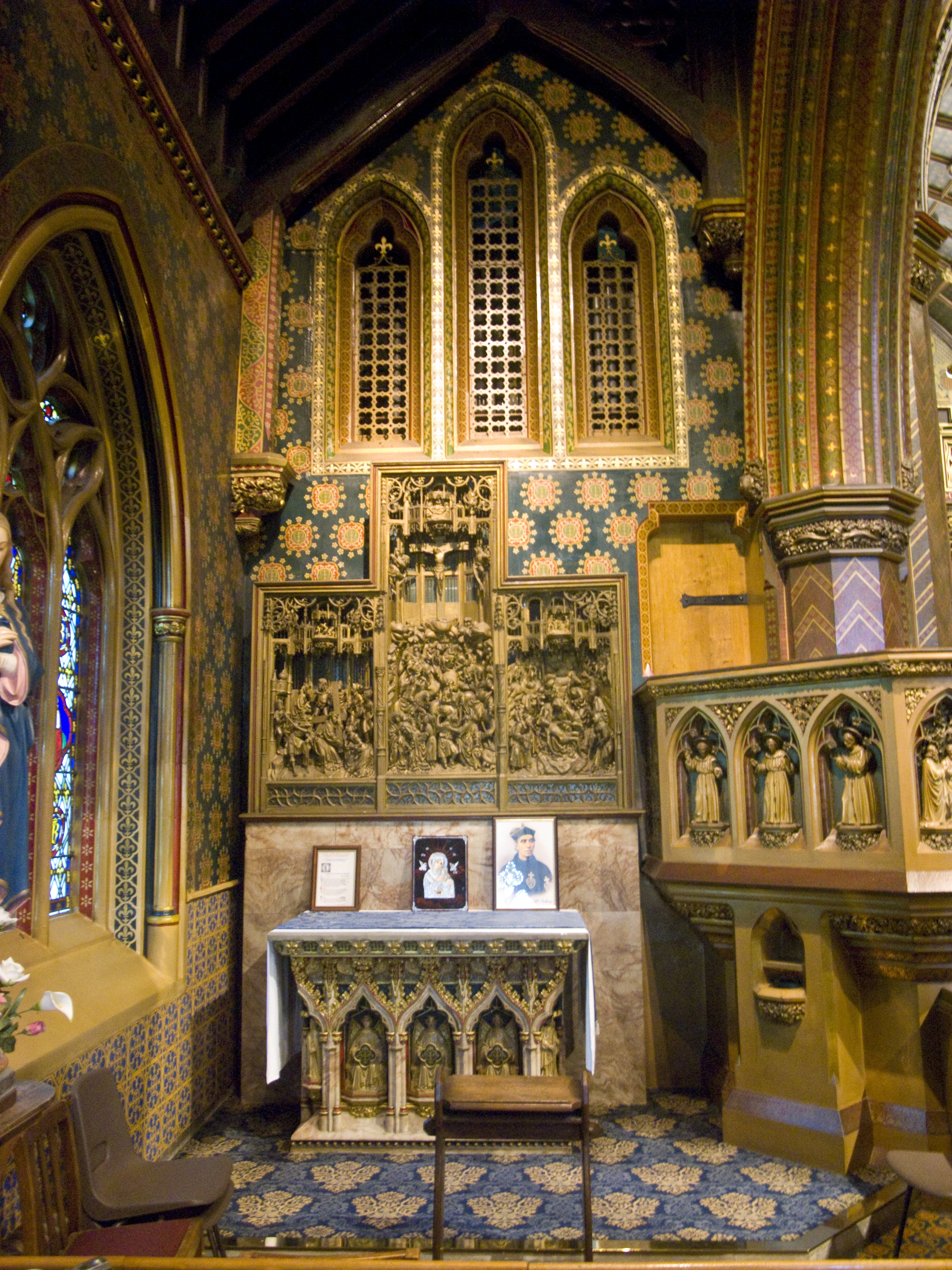
N.E. chapel, St Giles' Catholic Church

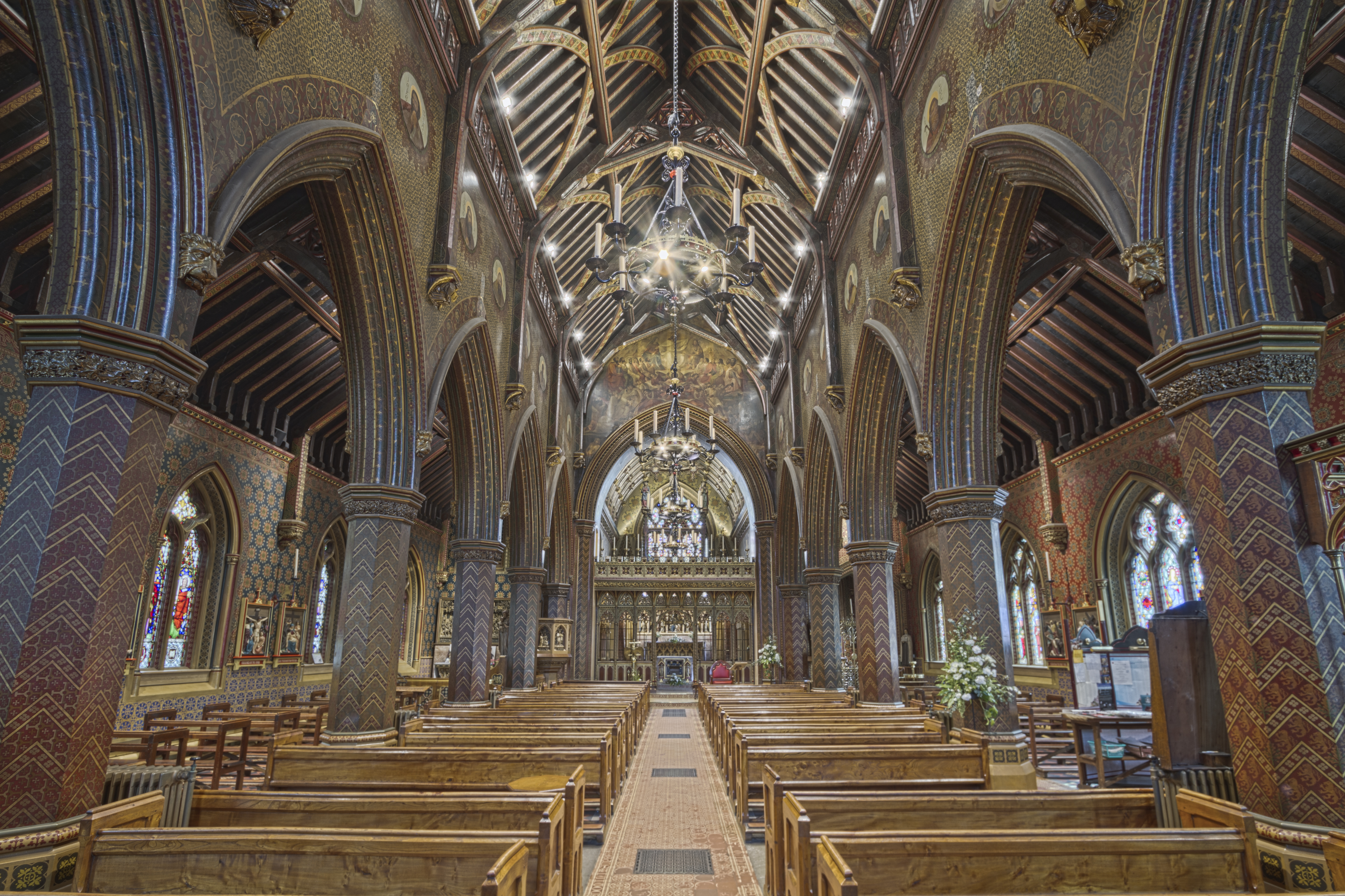
St Giles' RC Church, Cheadle, Staffordshire

The 200-foot (61 m) spire of St Giles' Catholic Church dominates Cheadle's skyline. Known as "Pugin's Gem", it is considered to be the most complete expression of Augustus Pugin's beliefs about what a church ought to be, with everything in it having a practical and symbolic purpose. The church featured heavily in local events celebrating the 200th anniversary of Pugin's birth.

The town also has an Anglican church dedicated to St Giles. It was totally rebuilt in 1837–39 to the design of J. P. Pritchett, but incorporating fragments and furniture from the earlier church. There is also a strong Methodist tradition in Cheadle, and in the 19th century it was the various Methodist chapels around the Cheadle area which taught many of the young boys who worked on the farms or in the coal mines to read and write. There is a large modern Methodist church in the town.

To the south-east of Cheadle are the remains of Croxden Abbey, founded in 1176 by Bertram de Verdun for monks of the Cistercian Order. The abbey is a 5-mile (8 km) walk from the town centre.

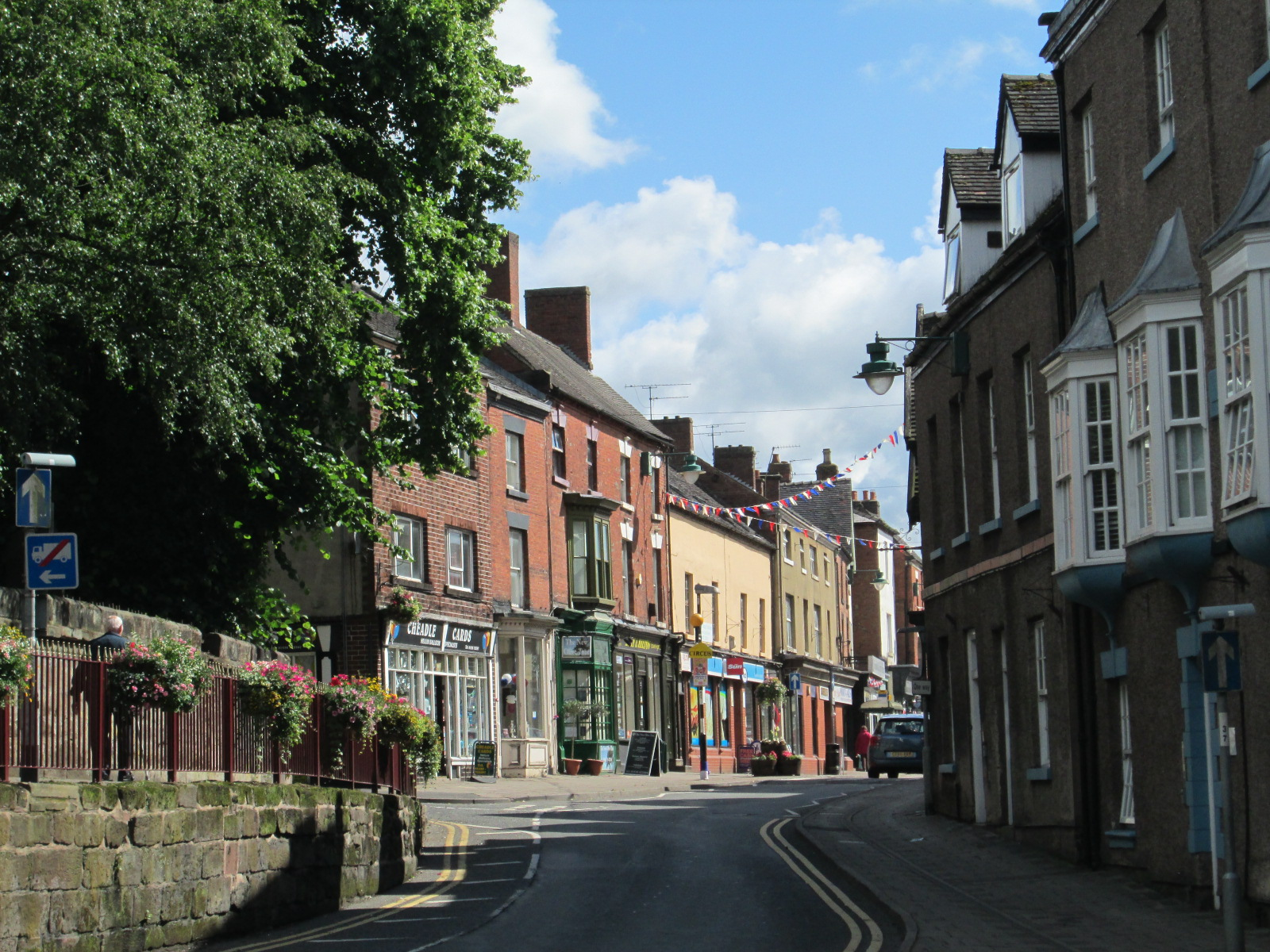
South-west end of High Street, near the parish church.

Cheadle is a base for exploring the Peak District National Park area, which is popular with walkers and rock climbers. Surrounded by lofty hills, Cheadle is the gateway to the wooded Churnet Valley and the Staffordshire Moorlands. It is also around 4 miles (6.4 km) from the Alton Towers Resort.

Cecilly Brook Local Nature Reserve is near the centre of town. It is one of the most important breeding sites for water voles in Staffordshire. There are 42 acres (17 ha) of landscaped lakes at the JCB factory. Local leisure facilities are at Cheadle Recreation Ground and South Moorlands Leisure Centre.

The High Street of Cheadle has many old buildings and is little changed from how it looked in the Victorian era.

== Economy ==
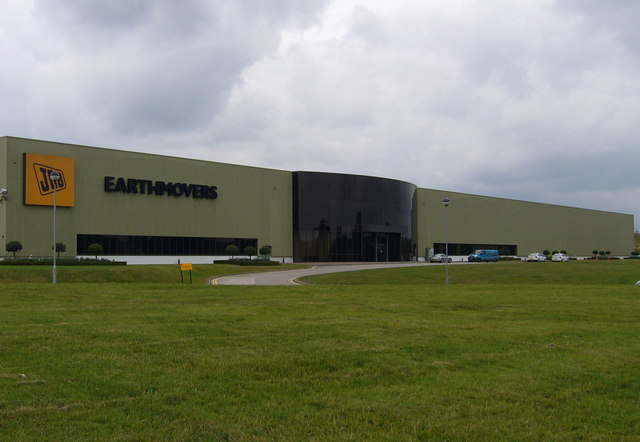
JCB Earthmovers factory

Cheadle is mentioned in Domesday Book as a small and unimportant hamlet with a small population. The town grew steadily over the next few hundred years, with the development of industry and agriculture. The historic industries that the town has depended on have been coal mining, silk, agriculture, brass making and the historic copper industry in nearby Froghall and Oakamoor. The town and the nearby village of Tean also had a textiles industry in tape weaving: the mill has since been converted into flats.

For hundreds of years the main industry in the Cheadle area was coal mining. The Cheadle Coalfield was part of the much larger North Staffordshire Coalfield. The town and the surrounding area were once home to over sixty mines, but the Industry declined in the 20th century, and one by one the remaining larger pits were closed; Parkhall (now the home to the JCB factories) and Hazlewall in the 1930s, New Haden in 1943 and Foxfield in 1965. However opencast mining and small scale adit mining carried on in Cheadle up until the 1990s.

Today the town's main employer is the large JCB factories. There are also several small industrial units on the site of the former New Haden Colliery and the local Alton Towers Resort employs many of its work force from the Cheadle area. A lot of people in the town commute to Stoke-on-Trent, Newcastle-under-Lyme, Uttoxeter and Derby.

Markets are held in the market place on Tuesdays, Fridays and Saturdays.

== Media and culture ==
=== The Cheadle and Tean Times ===
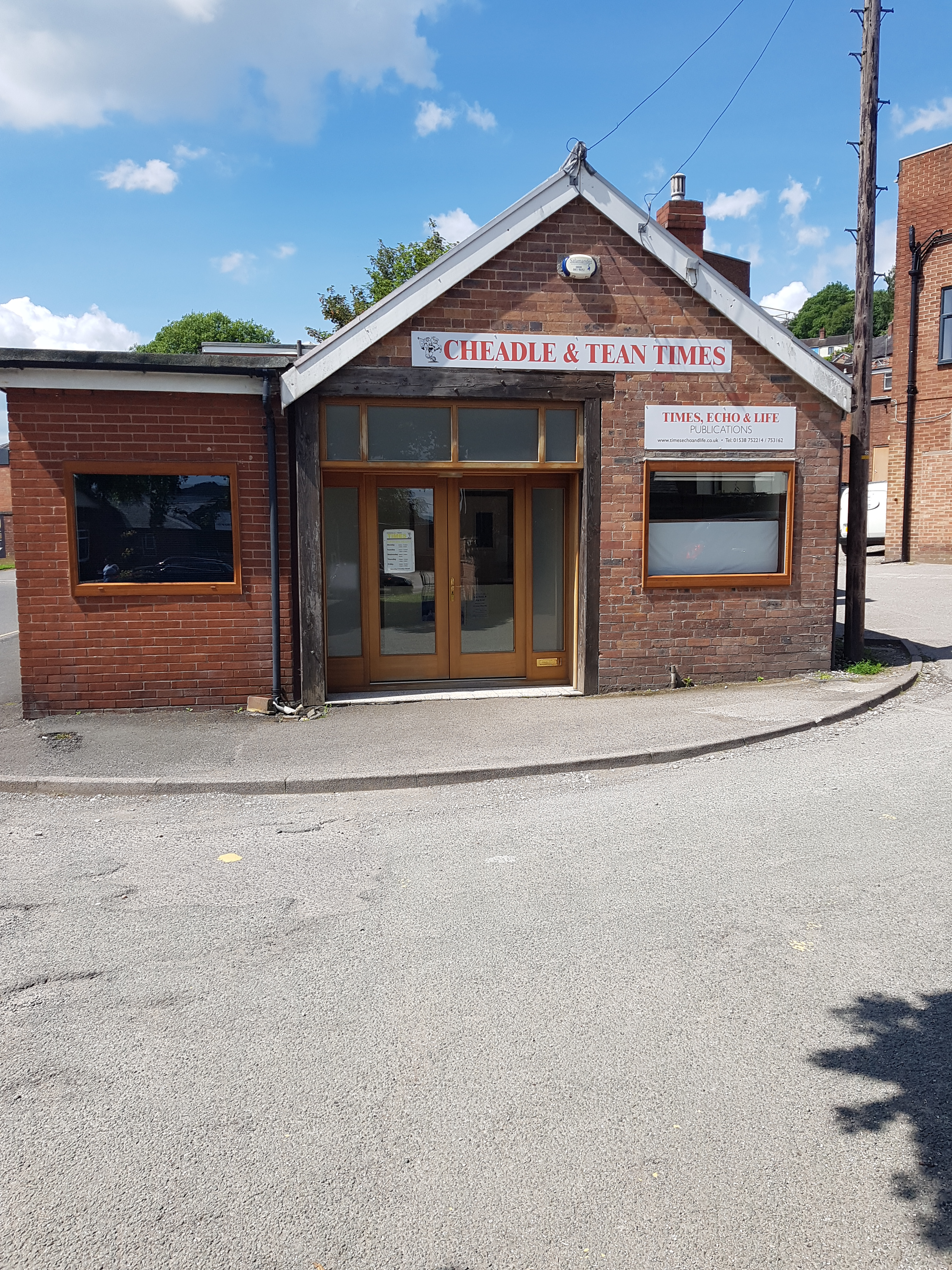
Cheadle and Tean Times office

The Cheadle and Tean Times has been publishing newspapers weekly in the town since 1896. The only family run and independent newspaper in North Staffordshire, it is known by townsfolk as the Stunner.

=== Other media ===
The weekly Cheadle Post & Times and the daily Sentinel newspapers also cover the town. Local radio stations are Hits Radio Staffordshire & Cheshire and Greatest Hits Radio Staffordshire & Cheshire from Stoke-on-Trent and BBC Radio Stoke. Community station Moorlands Radio covers the town from Leek.

Local TV coverage is provided by BBC West Midlands and ITV Central. Television signals are received from the Sutton Coldfield and the local relay transmitters.

=== In popular culture ===
Cheadle is the setting for episode 150 of popular horror fiction podcast The Magnus Archives.

== Transport ==
Cheadle used to be served by a branch line opened in 1901 from Cresswell which was a station on the North Staffordshire Railway Crewe to Derby Line. It took almost thirty years of petitioning by the local coalmasters and notables in the town for the Cheadle Railway Company to build the small branch line and station. Even though the branch was only about four miles (6 km) long it was difficult to build as a tunnel had to be constructed under the huge Bunter Sandstone Hill at Huntley. The tunnel was very wet and plagued by problems with its roof. In the 1930s the LMS Railway, which had taken over the North Staffordshire Railway, built a diversion line around Huntley tunnel and abandoned it. The tunnel survives because it was used as a coal mine in the '70s and '80s, and the southern portal remains; however the northern portal has long been filled in. With the opening of the branch line to Cheadle it meant that New Haden Colliery and Parkhall Colliery now had connections to the rail network, and Cheadle in general had its long-awaited rail connection to the outside world. The line closed to passenger traffic in 1963 but remained open to serve local gravel quarries until 1982.

Today, the nearest railway station is Blythe Bridge on the Crewe-Derby Line.

Bus services to Cheadle were provided by PMT until it was bought out by First Group. The service 32, First Potteries operate an hourly service to Hanley. D&G Bus operate service 32X which also serves Hanley every hour and service E1 to Alton Towers. Town service 123 and is operated by Stanton's of Stoke, who also operate route GO2 to Newcastle-under-Lyme. Service 30 to Leek is operated by Aimee's, 3 times per day.

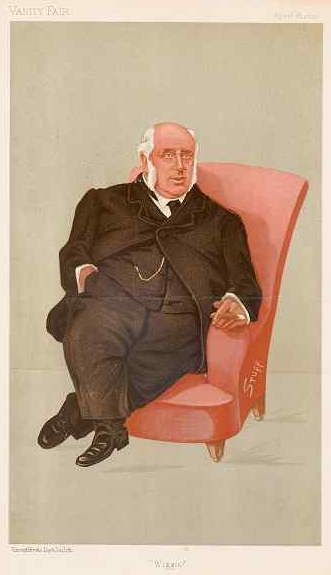
Caricature of Henry Wiggin, published in Vanity Fair, 1892

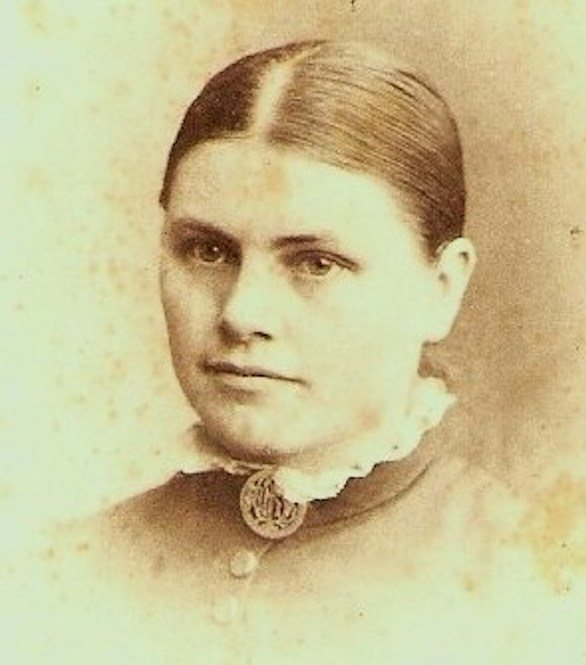
Mary Adela Blagg, pre-1898

== Notable people ==
- Sir Henry Samuel Wiggin, 1st Baronet (1824–1905), English metals manufacturer and Liberal Party politician, MP for East Staffordshire 1880–1885 and for Handsworth 1885–1892
- William Harris (1826–1911), Liberal politician and strategist in Birmingham during dramatic municipal reform
- Sir Charles Ernest Heath (1854–1936), British Army Major general.
- Mary Adela Blagg (1858–1944), astronomer, the first woman to be allowed into the Royal Astronomical Society
- Major Cecil Wedgwood (1863–1916), partner in the Wedgwood pottery firm, first Mayor of Stoke-on-Trent, won the Distinguished Service Order during the Boer War, killed in 1916 during the Battle of the Somme
- Edmund Crosby Quiggin (1875–1920), British linguist and scholar

=== Sport ===
- Fred Obrey (1912–1986), footballer, 62 professional appearances, mainly for Port Vale F.C.
- Fred Inskip (1924–2000), footballer, 26 appearances for Crewe Alexandra F.C.
- Terry Lowe (born 1943), footballer, 55 appearances for Port Vale F.C.
- Bernadette Swinnerton (born 1951) racing cyclist and a headteacher in Blythe Bridge
- Gareth Owen (born 1982), former footballer, 225 appearances (incl. 110 for Port Vale F.C.), now Academy Director at the Stoke City F.C. Under-21s and Academy

== Schools ==
- Cheadle High School
- Painsley Catholic College
- Moorlands 6th Form College
- Bishop Rawle C.E. (Aided) Primary School
- St Giles' Roman Catholic Primary School
- Cheadle Primary School
- St Thomas' Primary Catholic School (Tean)
- Great Wood Primary School (Tean)

== See also ==
- Listed buildings in Cheadle, Staffordshire
- J. & N. Philips
- Category:People from Cheadle, Staffordshire
- Woodhead Hall Former RAF & GCHQ station.
