= Painsley Catholic College =

Location
- Station Road; Cheadle; Staffordshire, ST10 1LH; England; 52.981714°N 1.988914°W

Information
- Type: Academy
- Religious affiliation: Roman Catholic
- Established: 1964
- Local authority: Staffordshire
- Specialists: Science, maths and computing
- Department for Education URN: 138729 Tables
- Ofsted: Reports
- Principal: R A Waugh
- Gender: Coeducational
- Age: 11 to 18
- Website: http://www.painsley.co.uk/

Painsley Catholic College is a Roman Catholic secondary school with academy status in Cheadle, Staffordshire, England. The name comes from Painsley Hall, Draycott in the Moors, from which the Painsley and Draycott Mission served the neighbouring areas and from which grew those parishes now connected with the college. It is also part of a multi-academy company made up of Painsley and its six feeder schools.

== Curriculum ==
Painsley Catholic College is a specialist science, maths and computing college.

== Alumni ==
- Gareth Owen (b. 1982) - Professional footballer
- Levison Wood (b. 1982) - Explorer
- Adam Yates (b. 1983) - Professional footballer
- Rachel Shenton (b. 1987) - Actress
- Adam Peaty (b. 1994) - Swimmer; Olympic gold medalist
- Emre Tezgel (b. 2005) - Professional footballer
