= Walsall Council elections =

Local government elections in Walsall, England

Walsall Metropolitan Borough Council elections are held three years out of every four, with a third of the council elected each time. Walsall Metropolitan Borough Council, which styles itself "Walsall Council", is the local authority for the metropolitan district of Walsall in the West Midlands, England. Since the last boundary changes in 2004, 60 councillors have been elected from 20 wards.

== Council elections ==
- 1998 Walsall Metropolitan Borough Council election
- 1999 Walsall Metropolitan Borough Council election
- 2000 Walsall Metropolitan Borough Council election
- 2002 Walsall Metropolitan Borough Council election
- 2003 Walsall Metropolitan Borough Council election
- 2004 Walsall Metropolitan Borough Council election (whole council elected after boundary changes)
- 2006 Walsall Metropolitan Borough Council election
- 2007 Walsall Metropolitan Borough Council election
- 2008 Walsall Metropolitan Borough Council election
- 2010 Walsall Metropolitan Borough Council election
- 2011 Walsall Metropolitan Borough Council election
- 2012 Walsall Metropolitan Borough Council election
- 2014 Walsall Metropolitan Borough Council election
- 2015 Walsall Metropolitan Borough Council election
- 2016 Walsall Metropolitan Borough Council election
- 2018 Walsall Metropolitan Borough Council election
- 2019 Walsall Metropolitan Borough Council election
- 2021 Walsall Metropolitan Borough Council election
- 2022 Walsall Metropolitan Borough Council election
- 2023 Walsall Metropolitan Borough Council election
- 2024 Walsall Metropolitan Borough Council election
- 2026 Walsall Metropolitan Borough Council election (whole council elected after boundary changes)

== Borough result maps ==
2004 results map

2006 results map

2007 results map

2008 results map

2010 results map

2011 results map

2012 results map

2014 results map

2015 results map

2016 results map

2018 results map

2019 results map

2021 results map

2022 results map

2023 results map

2024 results map

2026 results map

== By-election results ==
=== 1994-1998 ===
Bloxwich East By-Election 20 February 1997
Party	Candidate	Votes	%	±%
Labour		734	37.8	
Independent		563	28.9	
Conservative		411	21.1	
Democratic Labour		195	10.0	
Liberal Democrats		32	1.6	
National Front		13	0.7	
Majority		171	8.9	
Turnout		1,948	21.4	
Labour gain from Independent		Swing		

=== 2002-2006 ===
Aldridge Central and South By-Election 20 June 2002
Party	Candidate	Votes	%	±%
Conservative		1,251	47.9	−10.1
Independent		750	28.7	+18.9
Labour		264	10.1	−8.5
Liberal Democrats		178	6.8	−6.8
UKIP		87	3.3	+3.3
Independent		84	3.2	+3.2
Majority		501	19.2	
Turnout		2,614	26.7	
Conservative hold		Swing		

Paddock By-Election 3 April 2003
Party	Candidate	Votes	%	±%
Conservative		1,009	41.1	−2.9
Independent		539	22.0	+0.8
Liberal Democrats		416	17.0	+6.0
Labour		285	11.6	+0.0
UKIP		204	8.3	+8.3
Majority		470	19.1	
Turnout		2,453	23.3	
Conservative hold		Swing		

Hatherton Rushall By-Election 22 May 2003
Party	Candidate	Votes	%	±%
Conservative	Eddie Hughes	1,009	35.3	−16.3
BNP	William Locke	746	26.1	+26.1
Labour	Ann Wilson	650	22.7	−12.8
Independent	Lynette Benford	268	9.4	+9.4
Socialist Alliance	Louise Bradburn	188	6.6	+6.6
Majority		263	9.2	
Turnout		2,861	28.9	
Conservative hold		Swing		

Bloxwich East By-Election 19 June 2003
Party	Candidate	Votes	%	±%
Labour		621	35.9	−12.4
Conservative		612	35.4	+0.7
Independent		356	20.6	+7.9
Socialist Alliance		74	4.3	+4.3
Liberal Democrats		66	3.8	−0.5
Majority		9	0.5	
Turnout		1,729	21.7	
Labour hold		Swing		

Darlaston South By-Election 9 June 2005
Party	Candidate	Votes	%	±%
Labour	Graham Wilkes	688	37.1	+5.6
Independent	Christine Bott	367	19.7	−9.0
BNP	Kevin Smith	325	17.5	+17.5
Conservative	Chad Pitt	273	14.7	+0.9
Democratic Labour	Allan Johnston	120	6.5	+6.5
UKIP	Derek Bennett	72	3.9	+3.9
Independent	Peter Winterton	11	0.6	+0.6
Majority		321	17.4	
Turnout		1,856	20.8	
Labour hold		Swing		

Willenhall South By-Election 21 July 2005
Party	Candidate	Votes	%	±%
Labour	Carl Creaney	862	45.4	+1.4
Conservative	Keir Pedley	486	25.6	−2.4
Liberal Democrats	Robert Pearce	399	21.0	−7.4
BNP	William Vaughan	151	7.6	+7.6
Majority		376	19.8	
Turnout		1,898	19.5	
Labour hold		Swing		

=== 2006-2010 ===
Aldridge North and Walsall Wood By-Election 23 November 2006
Party	Candidate	Votes	%	±%
Conservative	Michael Flower	1,157	58.4	+12.5
Labour	Ian Pearson	309	15.6	+0.5
BNP	Dominic Bugler	222	11.2	−7.5
Liberal Democrats	Mark Greveson	160	8.1	−2.4
UKIP	Anthony Lenton	132	6.7	−3.0
Majority		848	42.8	
Turnout		1,980	17.0	
Conservative hold		Swing		

Birchills and Leamore By-Election 27 November 2008
Party	Candidate	Votes	%	±%
Conservative	Kamran Aftab	764	43.9	+12.9
Labour	Richard Worrall	661	37.9	−16.7
BNP	Malcolm Moore	90	5.2	+5.2
Liberal Democrats	Christine Cockayne	72	4.1	+4.1
Democratic Labour	Alan Davies	69	4.0	−2.3
UKIP	Elizabeth Hazell	52	3.0	+3.0
Green	Paul Booker	34	2.0	−6.1
Majority		103	5.9	
Turnout		1,742	19.6	
Conservative gain from Labour		Swing		

Rushall-Shelfield By-Election 26 February 2009
Party	Candidate	Votes	%	±%
Conservative	Ronald Carpenter	808	49.8	−11.2
Labour	Lee Jeavons	411	25.3	+5.6
Liberal Democrats	Leslie Smith	178	11.0	−1.5
UKIP	Timothy Melville	165	10.2	+10.2
Green	Karl MacNaughton	61	3.8	−3.1
Majority		398	24.5	
Turnout		1,623	18.0	
Conservative hold		Swing		

=== 2010-2014 ===
Bloxwich West By-Election 15 July 2010
Party	Candidate	Votes	%	±%
Labour	Frederick Westley	1,142	53.6	+18.5
Conservative	Theresa Smith	800	37.5	−3.2
UKIP	Paul Valdmanis	91	4.3	+4.3
Liberal Democrats	Christine Cockayne	71	3.3	−6.5
Green	Zoe Henderson	28	1.3	−0.4
Majority		342	16.0	
Turnout		2,132	22.0	
Labour gain from Conservative		Swing		

Rushall-Shelfield By-Election 11 November 2010
Party	Candidate	Votes	%	±%
Conservative	Lorna Rattigan	639	42.0	−1.8
Labour	Richard Worrall	611	40.1	+13.1
BNP	William Vaughan	141	9.3	+9.3
UKIP	Tim Melville	90	5.9	−2.3
Monster Raving Loony	Mark Beech	42	2.8	+2.8
Majority		28	1.8	
Turnout		1,523	16.0	
Conservative hold		Swing		

Bloxwich East By-Election 7 October 2011
Party	Candidate	Votes	%	±%
Labour	Julie Fitzpatrick	922	48.0	+5.2
Conservative	Les Beeley	834	43.5	+1.1
UKIP	Derek Bennett	98	5.1	−3.0
English Democrat	Chris Newey	49	2.6	+2.6
Green	Leandra Gebrakedan	16	0.8	+0.8
Majority		88	4.6	+4.1
Turnout		1,919		
Labour gain from Conservative		Swing		

Birchills Leamore by-election, 22 December 2011
Party	Candidate	Votes	%	±%
Labour	Tina Jukes	835	52.8	−2.2
Conservative	Kamran Afrab	512	32.4	−1.2
English Democrat	Chris Newey	130	8.2	+8.2
UKIP	Liz Hazell	59	3.7	−7.3
Green	Leandra Gebrakedan	46	2.9	+2.9
Majority		323	20.4	
Turnout		1,582		
Labour hold		Swing		

Bloxwich West by-election, 15 November 2012
Party	Candidate	Votes	%	±%
Labour	Patti Lane	1,049	50.2	−4.3
Conservative	Abi Pitt	783	37.5	+4.4
UKIP	Liz Hazell	195	9.3	+9.3
Liberal Democrats	Christine Cockayne	61	2.9	−0.3
Majority		266	12.7	
Turnout		2,088		
Labour hold		Swing		

Aldridge Central and South by-election, 15 August 2013
Party	Candidate	Votes	%	±%
Conservative	Timothy Wilson	1,254	49.7	−0.2
UKIP	Liz Hazell	615	24.4	+8.3
Labour	Bob Grainger	470	18.6	−4.3
Liberal Democrats	Roy Sheward	114	4.5	−6.6
English Democrat	Chris Newey	72	2.9	+2.9
Majority		639	25.3	
Turnout		2,525		
Conservative hold		Swing		

=== 2014-2018 ===
Birchills Leamore by-election, 24 July 2014
Party	Candidate	Votes	%	±%
Labour	Chris Jones	1,075	47.8	+6.6
Conservative	Gazanfer Ali	710	31.6	+7.2
UKIP	Paul White	445	19.8	−9.7
English Democrat	Chris Newey	20	0.9	+0.9
Majority		365	16.2	
Turnout		2,250		
Labour hold		Swing		

=== 2018-2022 ===
Pleck by-election, 16 December 2021
Party	Candidate	Votes	%	±%
Labour	Simran Kaur Cheema	698	64.6	−10.2
Conservative	Mohammed Saghir	382	35.4	+10.2
Majority		316	29.2	
Turnout		1,080		
Labour hold		Swing		

Cheema was unable to take her seat, due to being employed by Walsall Libraries at the time.

=== 2022-2026 ===
Vacancy caused by the resignation of councillor Garry Perry.

Pelsall by-election, 11 September 2025
Party	Candidate	Votes	%	±%
Reform	Graham Eardley	1,231	45.1	+31.3
Conservative	Lee Chapman	1,176	43.1	−24.1
Green	Joe Belcher	127	4.7	+4.7
Labour	Hannah Jones	125	4.6	−14.4
Liberal Democrats	Dan Barker	72	2.6	+2.6
Majority		55	2.0	
Turnout		2,731		
Reform gain from Conservative		Swing		
