= 2022 Walsall Metropolitan Borough Council election =

Local election in England

← 2021	5 May 2022	2023 →

21 of 60 seats on Walsall Council 31 seats needed for a majority

	First party	Second party	Third party
Leader	Mike Bird	Aftab Nawaz	n/a
Party	Conservative	Labour	Independent
Seats before	37	19	2
Seats after	38	20	2
Seat change	Steady	▲1	Steady
- Winner of each seat at the 2022 Walsall Metropolitan Borough Council election
Leader before election
Mike Bird
Conservative
Leader after election
Mike Bird
Conservative

The 2022 Walsall Metropolitan Borough Council election took place on 5 May 2022 to elect members of Walsall Council. This was on the same day as other local elections. 21 of the 60 seats were up for election, with 1 ward (Willenhall South) electing 2 councillors.

== Background ==
Since its creation in 1974, Walsall has varied between the Conservatives and Labour. Between 1973 and 2004, Walsall had been under Labour control from 1973 to 1976, 1980 to 1982, 1988 to 1992, 1995 to 1996, and 1999 to 2000. It was then under Conservative control between 2004 and 2011, before reverting to no overall control and being retaken by the Conservatives in 2019. In the 2021 elections, the Conservatives gained 5 seats with 54.1% of the vote, Labour lost 3 with 36.3%, and the Liberal Democrats lost their 2 seats on the council with 2.5%.

The seats up for election this year were last elected in 2018. In that election, the Conservatives gained 5 seats, Labour lost 2, and UKIP lost their 3 seats on the council.

== Previous council composition ==
After 2021 election		Before 2022 election		After 2022 election	
Party	Seats	Party	Seats	Party	Seats
Conservative	36	Conservative	37	Conservative	38
Labour	22	Labour	19	Labour	20
Independent	2	Independent	2	Independent	2

Changes:

- May 2021: Douglas James leaves Labour to sit as an independent
- July 2021: Harbans Sarohi (Labour) dies; by-election held in December, but winner unable to take seat
- December 2021: Sean Coughlan (Labour) resigns; seat left vacant until 2022 elections

== Results summary ==
2022 Walsall Metropolitan Borough Council election
Party	This election			Full council			This election		
Party	Seats	Net	Seats %	Other	Total	Total %	Votes	Votes %	+/−
Conservative	13	▲1	61.9	25	38	63.3	23,472	44.0	-10.1
Labour	8	▼1	38.1	13	21	35.0	23,712	44.6	+8.2
Independent	0	Steady	0.0	2	2	3.3	2,720	5.1	+3.9
Liberal Democrats	0	Steady	0.0	0	0	0.0	2,994	5.6	+3.1
Reform UK	0	Steady	0.0	0	0	0.0	434	0.8	-0.4

== Results by ward ==
An asterisk indicates an incumbent councillor.

=== Aldridge Central and South ===
Aldridge Central and South
Party	Candidate	Votes	%	±%
Conservative	Bobby Bains	2,365	68.16	−8.12
Labour	Kathryn Smith	1,105	31.84	+17.71
Majority		1,260	36.31	
Turnout		3,470		
Conservative hold		Swing		

=== Aldridge North and Walsall Wood ===
Aldridge North and Walsall Wood
Party	Candidate	Votes	%	±%
Conservative	Anthony Harris*	1,690	63.65	−7.88
Labour	Michael Bruce	965	36.35	+17.58
Majority		725	27.31	
Turnout		2,655		
Conservative hold		Swing		

=== Bentley and Darlaston North ===
Bentley and Darlaston North
Party	Candidate	Votes	%	±%
Labour	Rose Burley*	1,264	57.59	+1.36
Conservative	Mohammed Saghir	553	25.19	−18.58
Independent	Sharon Felton	378	17.22	New
Majority		711	32.39	
Turnout		2,195		
Labour hold		Swing		

=== Birchills Leamore ===
Birchills Leamore
Party	Candidate	Votes	%	±%
Labour	Tina Jukes	1,175	53.43	+17.04
Conservative	Amy Read	868	39.47	−14.98
Reform UK	Elaine Williams	156	7.09	+3.69
Majority		307	13.96	
Turnout		2,199		
Labour hold		Swing		

=== Blakenall ===
Blakenall
Party	Candidate	Votes	%	±%
Conservative	Izzy Hussain	809	38.12	+13.1
Labour	Matt Ward	692	32.61	−4.57
Independent	Dave Taylor	621	29.26	New
Majority		117	5.51	
Turnout		2,122		
Conservative gain from Labour		Swing		

=== Bloxwich East ===
Bloxwich East
Party	Candidate	Votes	%	±%
Conservative	Mark Statham*	1,205	60.07	−0.46
Labour	Adam Mohammed	660	32.90	−6.57
Liberal Democrats	Ben Hodges	141	7.03	New
Majority		545	27.17	
Turnout		2,006		
Conservative hold		Swing		

=== Bloxwich West ===
Bloxwich West
Party	Candidate	Votes	%	±%
Conservative	Louise Harrison*	1,499	58.58	−8.3
Labour	Michael Coulson	1,060	41.42	+15.62
Majority		439	17.16	
Turnout		2,559		
Conservative hold		Swing		

=== Brownhills ===
Brownhills
Party	Candidate	Votes	%	±%
Conservative	John Murray	1,206	49.00	−6.00
Labour	Emma Morgan	990	40.23	+5.93
Independent	Lee Chapman	265	10.77	New
Majority		216	8.78	
Turnout		2,461		
Conservative hold		Swing		

=== Darlaston South ===
Darlaston South
Party	Candidate	Votes	%	±%
Labour	Paul Bott*	1,686	78.90	+15.2
Conservative	Manju Gill	451	21.10	−15.2
Majority		1,235	57.79	
Turnout		2,137		
Labour hold		Swing		

=== Paddock ===
Paddock
Party	Candidate	Votes	%	±%
Conservative	Gurmeet Singh Sohal*	1,638	45.99	−6.61
Labour	Rishi Sharma	1,523	42.76	+0.66
Liberal Democrats	Daniel Barker	401	11.26	New
Majority		115	3.23	
Turnout		3,562		
Conservative hold		Swing		

=== Palfrey ===
Palfrey
Party	Candidate	Votes	%	±%
Labour	Shakila Hussain	2,101	53.80	−12.00
Independent	Shamim Ahmed	1,191	30.50	New
Conservative	Moz Khan	613	15.70	−18.50
Majority		910	23.30	
Turnout		3,905		
Labour hold		Swing		

=== Pelsall ===
Pelsall
Party	Candidate	Votes	%	±%
Conservative	Edward Lee*	1,707	64.05	−10.75
Labour	Patti Lane	680	25.52	+7.92
Reform UK	Graham Eardley	278	10.43	+6.83
Majority		1,027	38.54	
Turnout		2,665		
Conservative hold		Swing		

=== Pheasey Park Farm ===
Pheasey Park Farm
Party	Candidate	Votes	%	±%
Conservative	Chris Towe*	1,461	57.93	−13.17
Labour	Hannah Jones	881	34.93	+13.53
Liberal Democrats	Matthew Barker	180	7.14	+3.84
Majority		580	23.00	
Turnout		2,522		
Conservative hold		Swing		

=== Pleck ===
Pleck
Party	Candidate	Votes	%	±%
Labour	Ram Mehmi	1,739	73.56	−1.24
Conservative	Leyoh Goodall	625	26.44	+1.24
Majority		1,114	47.12	
Turnout		2,364		
Labour hold		Swing		

=== Rushall-Shelfield ===
Rushall-Shelfield
Party	Candidate	Votes	%	±%
Conservative	Vera Waters*	1,280	48.87	+5.37
Labour	David Morgan	1,074	41.01	−9.09
Independent	Jade Davies	265	10.12	New
Majority		206	7.87	
Turnout		2,619		
Conservative hold		Swing		

=== Short Heath ===
Short Heath
Party	Candidate	Votes	%	±%
Conservative	Amandeep Garcha	1,021	46.51	−7.59
Labour	Simon Rollason	843	38.41	+16.81
Liberal Democrats	Mohammed Yaqub	331	15.08	−9.22
Majority		178	8.11	
Turnout		2,195		
Conservative hold		Swing		

=== St. Matthews ===
St. Matthews
Party	Candidate	Votes	%	±%
Labour	Aftab Nawaz*	2,268	62.39	+11.59
Conservative	Vandana Sharma	1,064	29.27	−7.53
Liberal Democrats	Roger Watts	303	8.34	New
Majority		1,204	33.12	
Turnout		3,635		
Labour hold		Swing		

=== Streetly ===
Streetly
Party	Candidate	Votes	%	±%
Conservative	Suky Samra*	1,944	58.55	−9.35
Liberal Democrats	Jennifer Gray	717	21.60	+10.1
Labour	Eileen Russell	659	19.85	+4.05
Majority		1,227	36.96	
Turnout		3,320		
Conservative hold		Swing		

=== Willenhall North ===
Willenhall North
Party	Candidate	Votes	%	±%
Conservative	Rob Larden	986	41.64	−4.36
Labour	Lee Jeavons	694	29.31	+7.41
Liberal Democrats	Stuart Hodges	688	29.05	−0.75
Majority		292	12.33	
Turnout		2,368		
Conservative hold		Swing		

=== Willenhall South ===
Willenhall South
Party	Candidate	Votes	%	±%
Labour	Simran Cheema	1,653	60.24	+6.7
Labour	Connor Horton	1,462	53.28	−0.2
Conservative	Poonam Gill	729	26.56	−15.1
Conservative	Tony Sadler	677	24.67	−17.0
Liberal Democrats	Angela Hodges	233	8.49	+3.7
Majority				
Turnout		2,744		
Labour hold		Swing		
Labour hold		Swing		
