= 2023 Walsall Metropolitan Borough Council election =

Local election in England

← 2022	4 May 2023	2024 →

21 of 60 seats on Walsall Council 31 seats needed for a majority

	First party	Second party	Third party
Leader	Mike Bird	Aftab Nawaz	n/a
Party	Conservative	Labour	Independent
Seats before	38	19	3
Seats after	38	20	2
Seat change	Steady	▲1	▼1
- Winner of each seat at the 2023 Walsall Metropolitan Borough Council election
Leader before election
Mike Bird
Conservative
Leader after election
Mike Bird
Conservative

The 2023 Walsall Metropolitan Borough Council election took place on 4 May 2023 to elect members of Walsall Council in the West Midlands, England. This was on the same day as other local elections. There were 21 of the 60 seats were up for election.

The Conservatives retained their majority on the council. Labour gained one seat which had been held by an independent councillor, although as that councillor had originally been elected as a Labour councillor it was described as a technical gain only.

== Background ==
Since its creation in 1974, Walsall has varied between the Conservatives and Labour. Between 1973 and 2004, Walsall had been under Labour control from 1973 to 1976, 1980 to 1982, 1988 to 1992, 1995 to 1996, and 1999 to 2000. It was then under Conservative control between 2004 and 2011, before reverting to no overall control and being retaken by the Conservatives in 2019. In the 2022 elections, the Conservatives gained 1 seat with 43.8% of the vote, Labour lost 1 with 45.2%, and the Liberal Democrats received 5.4%.

The seats up for election this year were last elected in 2019. In that election, the Conservatives gained 2 seats with 41% of the vote, and Labour lost 2 seats with 38%. This election also saw the emergence of UKIP, receiving 10.5% of the vote.

Prior to the election, an MRP model released by YouGov predicted that the election in Walsall was 'Too close to call', but Labour was expected to make significant gains. This model had Labour at 51% and the Conservatives at 37%.

== Previous council composition ==
After 2022 election		Before 2023 election		After 2023 election	
Party	Seats	Party	Seats	Party	Seats
Conservative	38	Conservative	38	Conservative	38
Labour	20	Labour	19	Labour	20
Independent	2	Independent	3	Independent	2

== Results summary ==
2023 Walsall Metropolitan Borough Council election
Party	This election			Full council			This election		
Party	Seats	Net	Seats %	Other	Total	Total %	Votes	Votes %	+/−
Conservative	13	Steady	61.9	25	38	63.3	22,445	46.1	+2.3
Labour	7	Steady	38.1	13	21	35.0	19,907	40.9	-4.3
Independent	0	Steady	0.0	2	2	3.3	1,259	2.6	-1.4
Liberal Democrats	0	Steady	0.0	0	0	0.0	2,275	4.7	-1.2
Reform UK	0	Steady	0.0	0	0	0.0	1,518	3.1	+2.3
Green	0	Steady	0.0	0	0	0.0	1,309	2.7	+2.7

== Ward results ==
=== Aldridge Central and South ===
Aldridge Central and South (1)
Party	Candidate	Votes	%	±%
Conservative	Pard Kaur	1,889	61.21	▲13.61
Labour	Muhammad Abdul Hafeez Khan	731	23.69	▲6.89
Green	Guan Khai Chan	258	8.36	▲4.66
Reform UK	Irene Michelle Sim Sim Yoong-Henery	181	5.87	N/A
Majority		1,158	38.2	
Rejected ballots		27	0.88	
Turnout		3,086	28.19	
Conservative hold				

=== Aldridge North and Walsall Wood ===
Aldridge North and Walsall Wood (1)
Party	Candidate	Votes	%	±%
Conservative	Amanda Kate Parkes	1,324	53.45	▲1.05
Labour	Michael Anthony Bruce	777	31.37	
Reform UK	Lesley Ann Lynch	240	9.69	N/A
Green	Shaun Alardice McKenzie	128	5.17	N/A
Majority		547	22.2	
Rejected ballots		8	0.32	
Turnout		2,477	24.7	
Conservative hold				

=== Bentley and Darlastonn North ===
Bentley and Darlaston North (1)
Party	Candidate	Votes	%	±%
Labour	Saiqa Nasreen	1,138	58.39	▲6.89
Independent	Stuart Raymond Chapman	415	21.29	N/A
Conservative	Amarjeet Singh Flora	350	17.96	▲2.66
Independent	Abdul Kalam	39	2.00	N/A
Majority		723	37.10	
Rejected ballots		7	0.36	
Turnout		1,949	20.13	
Labour hold				

=== Birchills-Leamore ===
Birchills-Leamore (1)
Party	Candidate	Votes	%	±%
Conservative	Gaz Ali	1,139	46.57	▼5.03
Labour	Elliot Pfebve	992	40.56	▼7.84
Reform UK	Elaine Ruth Williams	308	12.59	N/A
Majority		143	6.01	
Rejected ballots		7	0.29	
Turnout		2,446	22.87	
Conservative hold				

=== Blakenall ===
Blakenall (1)
Party	Candidate	Votes	%	±%
Labour	Emma Jane Morgan	747	36.93	▼14.47
Independent	Dave Taylor	596	29.46	N/A
Conservative	Mushy Khan	555	27.43	▲16.63
Reform UK	Chris Phipps	72	3.56	N/A
Green	Andrea Monica Maynard	53	2.62	▼1.28
Majority		192	7.47	
Rejected ballots		0	0.00	
Turnout		2,023	20.16	
Labour hold				

=== Bloxwich East ===
Bloxwich East (1)
Party	Candidate	Votes	%	±%
Conservative	Corin Ann Statham	957	50.88	▼2.22
Labour	Bob Thomas	732	38.92	▼7.98
Reform UK	Peggy Coop	98	5.21	N/A
Green	Susan Webster	87	4.63	N/A
Majority		225	11.96	
Rejected ballots		7	0.37	
Turnout		1,881	21.08	
Conservative hold				

=== Bloxwich West ===
Bloxwich West (1)
Party	Candidate	Votes	%	±%
Conservative	Matt Follows	1,175	48.18	▼16.02
Labour	Michael John Coulson	950	38.95	▲3.15
Reform UK	Stacey Nicole Timmins	172	7.05	N/A
Green	Mia Kalogjera	72	2.95	N/A
Liberal Democrats	Stuart Ronald Hodges	66	2.71	N/A
Majority		225	9.23	
Rejected ballots		4	0.16	
Turnout		2,439	24.83	
Conservative hold				

=== Brownhills ===
Brownhills (1)
Party	Candidate	Votes	%	±%
Conservative	Ken Ferguson	1,117	52.84	▲16.24
Labour Co-op	David Huw Morgan	848	40.11	▲18.41
Green	Thomas Stephen Powell	133	6.29	N/A
Majority		269	12.73	
Rejected ballots		16	0.76	
Turnout		2,114	21.76	
Conservative hold				

=== Darlaston South ===
Darlaston South (1)
Party	Candidate	Votes	%	±%
Labour	Matt Ward	1,353	74.55	
Conservative	Pally Samra	449	24.74	
Majority		903	49.81	
Rejected ballots		13	0.72	
Turnout		1,815	16.74	
Labour hold				

=== Paddock ===
Paddock (1)
Party	Candidate	Votes	%	±%
Conservative	Waheed Rasab	1,854	49.64	▼1.66
Labour	Rishi Sharma	1,279	34.24	▼1.66
Liberal Democrats	Daniel James Barker	378	10.12	▲4.72
Independent	David Trevor William Alexander	209	5.60	N/A
Majority		575	15.40	
Rejected ballots		15	0.40	
Turnout		3,735	38.23	
Conservative hold				

=== Palfrey ===
Palfrey (1)
Party	Candidate	Votes	%	±%
Labour	Hajran Bashir	1,741	50.46	▼12.44
Conservative	Shamim Ahmed	1,379	39.97	▲11.27
Green	Sadat Hussain	178	5.16	N/A
Reform UK	Dexter Williams	129	3.74	N/A
Majority		362	10.49	
Rejected ballots		23	0.67	
Turnout		3,450	31.43	
Labour hold				

=== Pelsall ===
Pelsall (1)
Party	Candidate	Votes	%	±%
Conservative	Rose Ann Martin	1,395	59.51	▲3.51
Labour	Mugabe Reid	511	21.80	▲2.90
Reform UK	Graham Eardley	216	9.22	N/A
Liberal Democrats	Isaac Ben Crosby	213	9.09	N/A
Majority		884	37.71	
Rejected ballots		9	0.38	
Turnout		2,344	26.82	
Conservative hold				

=== Pheasey Park Farm ===
Pheasey Park Farm (1)
Party	Candidate	Votes	%	±%
Conservative	Mike Bird	1,220	56.46	▲2.36
Labour	Steve Wade	750	34.71	▲10.41
Liberal Democrats	Matthew George Barker	170	7.87	N/A
Majority		470	21.75	
Rejected ballots		21	0.97	
Turnout		2,161	24.73	
Conservative hold				

=== Pleck ===
Pleck (1)
Party	Candidate	Votes	%	±%
Labour	Khizar Hussain	1,789	76.62	▼1.88
Conservative	Manju Chamdal Gill	523	22.40	▲0.9
Majority		1,266	54.22	
Rejected ballots		23	0.99	
Turnout		2,335	22.68	
Labour hold				

=== Rushall-Shefield ===
Rushall-Shefield (1)
Party	Candidate	Votes	%	±%
Conservative	Lorna Jean Rattigan	1,173	53.05	▲11.55
Labour	Lee David Jeavons	1,038	46.95	▲16.85
Majority		135	6.1	
Rejected ballots		0	0.00	
Turnout		2,211	23.84	
Conservative hold				

=== Short Heath ===
Short Heath (1)
Party	Candidate	Votes	%	±%
Conservative	Poonam Chamdal Gill	851	42.59	▼3.85
Labour Co-op	Simon Frank Rollason	779	38.85	▲9.26
Liberal Democrats	Benjamin Aaron Hodges	361	18.01	▼5.96
Majority		72	3.74	
Rejected ballots		14	0.70	
Turnout		2,005	22.84	
Conservative hold				

=== St Matthews ===
St Matthews (1)
Party	Candidate	Votes	%	±%
Labour	Farhana Mazhar	1,654	51.16	▲3.26
Conservative	Mozamil Khan	950	29.39	▼6.51
Green	Ateeq Akhtar	400	12.37	▲2.87
Liberal Democrats	Mohammed Yaqub	212	6.56	▼0.14
Majority		704	21.77	
Rejected ballots		17	0.53	
Turnout		3,233	29.44	
Labour hold				

=== Streetly ===
Streetly (1)
Party	Candidate	Votes	%	±%
Conservative	Sarah-Jane Cooper	1,824	61.29	▲9.99
Labour	Robert Sebastian Lipke	753	25.30	▲14.60
Liberal Democrats	Roger Watts	289	9.71	▼11.09
Reform UK	Parpui Shaw	102	3.43	N/A
Majority		1,071	35.99	
Rejected ballots		8	0.27	
Turnout		2,976	28.48	
Conservative hold				

=== Willenhall North ===
Willenhall North (1)
Party	Candidate	Votes	%	±%
Conservative	Adam John Hicken	976	45.84	▲0.74
Labour	Nahid Ahmed	761	35.75	▲14.25
Liberal Democrats	Leandra Lola Gebrakedan	376	17.66	▼15.74
Majority		215	10.09	
Rejected ballots		16	0.75	
Turnout		2,129	23.16	
Conservative hold				

=== Willenhall South ===
Willenhall South (1)
Party	Candidate	Votes	%	±%
Labour	Natalie Louise Latham	1,345	62.24	▲0.34
Conservative	Mak Uppal	584	27.03	▼12.07
Liberal Democrats	Angela Mary Hodges	210	9.72	N/A
Majority		761	35.21	
Rejected ballots		22	1.02	
Turnout		2,161	18.64	
Labour hold				
