= 2024 Walsall Metropolitan Borough Council election =

Local election in England

← 2023	2 May 2024	2026 →

20 of 60 seats on Walsall Council 31 seats needed for a majority

	First party	Second party	Third party
Leader	Mike Bird	Matt Ward
Party	Conservative	Labour	Independent
Seats before	37	12	11
Seats won	12	5	3
Seats after	37	14	9
Seat change	Steady	▲2	▼2
Popular vote	21,750	20,240	7,618
Percentage	37.1%	34.5%	13.0%
Swing	▼9.0%	▼6.4%	▲10.4%
- Winner of each seat at the 2024 Walsall Metropolitan Borough Council election
Leader before election
Mike Bird
Conservative
Leader after election
Garry Perry
Conservative

The 2024 Walsall Metropolitan Borough Council election took place on 2 May 2024 to elect members of Walsall Council in the West Midlands. This was on the same day as other local elections. 20 of the 60 seats were up for election.

== Background ==
Since its creation in 1974, Walsall has varied between the Conservatives and Labour. Between 1973 and 2004, Walsall had been under Labour control from 1973 to 1976, 1980 to 1982, 1988 to 1992, 1995 to 1996, and 1999 to 2000. It was then under Conservative control between 2004 and 2011, before reverting to no overall control and being retaken by the Conservatives in 2019. In the 2023 elections, the Conservatives retained all 13 seats up for election, receiving 46.1% of the vote, Labour gained 1 seat with 40.9%, and the Liberal Democrats received 4.7%. Despite only standing in 9 of the 20 wards, Reform UK received 3.1%, performing best in Birchills-Leamore, where they received 12.6% of the vote.

The seats up for election this year were last elected in 2021. In that election, the Conservatives gained 5 seats with 54% of the vote, and Labour lost 3 seats with 36%.

=== Predictions ===
YouGov released an MRP poll, conducted between 14-29 April 2024. Their findings expected "significant" Labour gains across the country. YouGov expect this to be replicated in Walsall. Their poll has the Conservative Party on 36.1%, Labour on 41.9% and Reform UK on 13.2%.

== Previous council composition ==
After 2023 election		Before 2024 election		After 2024 election	
Party	Seats	Party	Seats	Party	Seats
Conservative	38	Conservative	37	Conservative	37
Labour	20	Labour	12	Labour	14
Independent	2	Independent	10	Independent	9

Changes 2023–2024:

- November 2023: Hajran Bashir, Sabina Ditta, Naheed Gultasib, Farhana Hassan, Khizar Hussain, Saiqa Nasreen, Aftab Nawaz, and Abdus Nazir leave Labour to sit as independents

== Best Performance by Party ==
Best Performance by Party 2024 (%)
Party	Ward	Votes	%	+/-
Conservative	Pelsall	1,801	67.2	+7.7
Labour	Willenhall South	1,773	68.1	+5.2
Independent	Palfrey	2,134	48.4	+48.4
Reform UK	Bloxwich West	474	17.9	+10.8
Liberal Democrats	Willenhall North	355	15.2	-2.6
Green	St Matthews	296	7.1	-5.3

== Summary ==
The Conservatives retained their majority on the council. Less than a week after the election the Conservative leader of the council, Mike Bird, was suspended from the party. He has subsequently resigned and was replaced as leader by Garry Perry at a council meeting on 3 June 2024.

=== Election result ===
2024 Walsall Metropolitan Borough Council election
Party	This election			Full council			This election		
Party	Seats	Net	Seats %	Other	Total	Total %	Votes	Votes %	+/−
Conservative	12	Steady	60.0	25	37	61.7	21,750	37.1	–9.0
Labour	5	▲2	25.0	9	14	23.3	20,240	34.5	–6.4
Independent	3	▼2	15.0	6	9	15.0	7,618	13.0	+10.4
Reform UK	0	Steady	0.0	0	0	0.0	5,171	8.8	+5.7
Green	0	Steady	0.0	0	0	0.0	1,935	3.3	+0.6
Liberal Democrats	0	Steady	0.0	0	0	0.0	1,887	3.2	–1.5
TUSC	0	Steady	0.0	0	0	0.0	101	0.2	N/A

== Ward results ==
=== Aldridge Central and South ===
Aldridge Central and South
Party	Candidate	Votes	%	±%
Conservative	Tim Wilson	2,268	59.9	–1.3
Labour	James Harrison	926	24.5	+0.8
Reform UK	Irene Henery	378	10.0	+4.1
Green	Guan Chan	214	5.7	–2.7
Majority		1,342	35.4	–2.8
Turnout		3,786	35.2	+7.0
Registered electors		10,824		
Conservative hold		Swing	▼1.1	

=== Aldridge North and Walsall Wood ===
Aldridge North and Walsall Wood
Party	Candidate	Votes	%	±%
Conservative	Keith Sears	1,399	51.2	–2.3
Labour	Dean Margetts	696	25.5	–5.9
Reform UK	Lesley Lynch	428	15.7	+6.0
Green	Shaun McKenzie	123	4.5	–0.7
Liberal Democrats	Nigel Walker	85	3.1	N/A
Majority		703	25.7	+3.5
Turnout		2,731	27.7	+3.0
Registered electors		9,913		
Conservative hold		Swing	▲1.8	

=== Bentley and Darlaston North ===
Bentley and Darlaston North
Party	Candidate	Votes	%	±%
Labour	Lucie Nahal	952	36.4	–22.0
Independent	Nahid Ahmed	788	30.1	+8.8
Reform UK	Stuart Chapman	414	15.8	N/A
Conservative	Kyra Murphy	389	14.9	–3.1
Independent	Abul Kalam	75	2.9	+0.9
Majority		164	6.3	–30.8
Turnout		2,618	27.3	+7.2
Registered electors		9,651		
Labour hold		Swing	▼15.4	

=== Birchills-Leamore ===
Birchills-Leamore
Party	Candidate	Votes	%	±%
Conservative	Amo Hussain*	1,089	40.6	–6.0
Labour	Elliot Pfebve	936	34.9	–5.7
Reform UK	Elaine Williams	406	15.1	+2.5
Green	Toyin Oshaniwa	165	6.1	N/A
Liberal Democrats	Paul Wild	89	3.3	N/A
Majority		153	5.7	–0.3
Turnout		2,685	25.1	+2.2
Registered electors		10,794		
Conservative hold		Swing	▼0.2	

=== Blakenall ===
Blakenall
Party	Candidate	Votes	%	±%
Independent	Peter Smith*	971	42.6	N/A
Labour	Ian Robertson	807	35.4	–1.5
Reform UK	Peggy Coop	230	10.1	+6.5
Conservative	Ana-Maria Zinica	206	9.0	–18.4
Green	Andrea Maynard	67	2.9	+0.3
Majority		164	7.2	N/A
Turnout		2,281	22.2	+2.0
Registered electors		10,361		
Independent hold				

=== Bloxwich East ===
Bloxwich East
Party	Candidate	Votes	%	±%
Conservative	Gary Flint*	843	40.9	–10.0
Labour	Stephen Wade	814	39.5	+0.6
Reform UK	Sue Spencer	338	16.4	+11.2
Liberal Democrats	Angela Hodges	66	3.2	N/A
Majority		29	1.4	–10.6
Turnout		2,061	23.4	+2.3
Registered electors		8,875		
Conservative hold		Swing	▼5.3	

=== Bloxwich West ===
Bloxwich West
Party	Candidate	Votes	%	±%
Labour	Michael Coulson	1,065	40.2	+1.2
Conservative	Tony Sadla	1,043	39.4	–8.8
Reform UK	Nicky Barker	474	17.9	+10.8
Liberal Democrats	Stuart Hodges	66	2.5	–0.2
Majority		22	0.8	N/A
Turnout		2,648	27.2	+2.4
Registered electors		9,844		
Labour gain from Conservative		Swing	▲5.0	

=== Brownhills ===
Brownhills
Party	Candidate	Votes	%	±%
Conservative	Kerry Murphy*	1,056	44.0	–8.6
Labour	Michael Bruce	779	32.5	–7.6
Reform UK	Joshua Dixon	401	16.7	N/A
Independent	Karl Andrews	162	6.8	N/A
Majority		277	11.5	–1.2
Turnout		2,398	25.0	+3.2
Registered electors		9,649		
Conservative hold		Swing	▼0.5	

=== Darlaston South ===
Darlaston South
Party	Candidate	Votes	%	±%
Labour	Chris Bott*	1,612	65.7	–8.9
Reform UK	Peter Burton	380	15.5	N/A
Conservative	Owen Webster	360	14.7	–10.0
Liberal Democrats	Isaac Crosby	103	4.2	N/A
Majority		1,232	50.2	+0.4
Turnout		2,455	23.0	+6.3
Registered electors		10,829		
Labour hold				

=== Paddock ===
Paddock
Party	Candidate	Votes	%	±%
Conservative	Nick Gandham*	1,485	37.3	–12.3
Labour	Bob Thomas	1,085	27.3	–6.9
Independent	Ghulam Papu	789	19.8	N/A
Liberal Democrats	Dan Barker	279	7.0	–3.1
Reform UK	Peter Faultless	187	4.7	N/A
Green	Gordon Shipley	155	3.9	N/A
Majority		400	10.0	–5.4
Turnout		3,980	41.0	+2.8
Registered electors		9,832		
Conservative hold		Swing	▼2.7	

=== Palfrey ===
Palfrey
Party	Candidate	Votes	%	±%
Independent	Sabina Ditta*	2,134	48.4	N/A
Labour	Zulkifi Ahmed	1,044	23.7	–26.8
Conservative	Shamim Ahmed	693	15.7	–24.3
Green	Sadat Hussain	298	6.8	+1.6
Reform UK	Dexter Williams	240	5.4	+1.7
Majority		1,090	24.7	N/A
Turnout		4,409	40.1	+8.7
Registered electors		11,086		
Independent hold				

=== Pelsall ===
Pelsall
Party	Candidate	Votes	%	±%
Conservative	Garry Perry*	1,801	67.2	+7.7
Labour	Robert Lipke	510	19.0	–2.8
Reform UK	Graham Eardley	369	13.8	+4.6
Majority		1,291	48.2	+10.5
Turnout		2,680	31.2	+4.4
Registered electors		8,682		
Conservative hold		Swing	▲5.3	

=== Pheasey Park Farm ===
Pheasey Park Farm
Party	Candidate	Votes	%	±%
Conservative	Adrian Andrew*	1,614	61.0	+4.0
Labour	Mark Bradley	825	31.2	–3.8
Liberal Democrats	Matthew Barker	208	7.9	±0.0
Majority		789	28.8	+7.0
Turnout		2,647	30.9	+6.2
Registered electors		8,655		
Conservative hold		Swing	▲3.9	

=== Pleck ===
Pleck
Party	Candidate	Votes	%	±%
Independent	Naheed Gultasib*	1,459	39.4	N/A
Labour	Adam Mohammed	1,323	35.8	–40.8
Conservative	Akbar Ali	557	15.1	–7.3
Green	Mary Beddows	260	7.0	N/A
TUSC	Jonathan Stanley	101	2.7	N/A
Majority		136	3.6	N/A
Turnout		3,700	36.0	+13.3
Registered electors		10,430		
Independent hold				

=== Rushall-Shelfield ===
Rushall-Shelfield
Party	Candidate	Votes	%	±%
Conservative	Jade Chapman	1,068	41.8	–11.3
Labour Co-op	David Morgan	951	37.3	–9.7
Reform UK	Pete Page	351	13.8	N/A
Green	Joe Belcher	182	7.1	N/A
Majority		117	4.5	–1.6
Turnout		2,552	27.9	+4.1
Registered electors		9,248		
Conservative gain from Independent		Swing	▼0.8	

=== Short Heath ===
Short Heath
Party	Candidate	Votes	%	±%
Conservative	Josh Whitehouse*	1,093	46.8	+4.2
Labour	Lee Jeavons	922	39.5	+0.6
Liberal Democrats	Chad Pitt	322	13.8	–4.2
Majority		171	7.3	+3.6
Turnout		2,337	27.2	+4.4
Registered electors		8,712		
Conservative hold		Swing	▲1.8	

=== St Matthews ===
St Matthews
Party	Candidate	Votes	%	±%
Labour	Eileen Russell	1,430	34.5	–16.9
Independent	Mushtaq Ahmed	1,240	29.9	N/A
Conservative	Vandana Sharma	894	21.6	–7.9
Green	Raja Akhtar	296	7.1	–5.3
Reform UK	Robin Perry	287	6.9	N/A
Majority		190	4.6	–17.2
Turnout		4,147	37.2	+7.8
Registered electors		11,230		
Labour gain from Independent				

=== Streetly ===
Streetly
Party	Candidate	Votes	%	±%
Conservative	Keir Pedley*	2,203	60.5	–1.0
Labour	Harjinder Nahal	801	22.0	–3.4
Reform UK	Ruby Ki-Kydd	288	7.9	+4.5
Liberal Democrats	Kieran Smith	176	4.8	–4.9
Green	Alison Walters	175	4.8	N/A
Majority		1,402	38.5	+2.5
Turnout		3,643	35.4	+6.0
Registered electors		10,400		
Conservative hold		Swing	▲1.2	

=== Willenhall North ===
Willenhall North
Party	Candidate	Votes	%	±%
Conservative	Stacie Elson*	997	42.6	–3.6
Labour	Tal Singh	989	42.2	+6.2
Liberal Democrats	Benjamin Hodges	355	15.2	–2.6
Majority		8	0.4	–9.7
Turnout		2,341	26.1	+2.9
Registered electors		9,177		
Conservative hold		Swing	▼4.9	

=== Willenhall South ===
Willenhall South
Party	Candidate	Votes	%	±%
Labour	Klara Margetts	1,773	68.1	+5.2
Conservative	Walter Eze	692	26.6	–0.7
Liberal Democrats	Leandra Gebrakedan	138	5.3	–4.5
Majority		1,081	41.5	+6.3
Turnout		2,603	22.8	+4.2
Registered electors		11,669		
Labour hold		Swing	▲3.0	

== By-elections ==
=== Pelsall ===
Pelsall by-election: 11 September 2025
Party	Candidate	Votes	%	±%
Reform UK	Graham Eardley	1,231	45.1	+31.3
Conservative	Lee Chapman	1,176	43.1	–24.1
Green	Joe Belcher	127	4.7	N/A
Labour	Hannah Jones	125	4.6	–14.4
Liberal Democrats	Dan Barker	72	2.6	N/A
Majority		55	2.0	N/A
Turnout		2,731	32.0	+0.8
Reform UK gain from Conservative		Swing	▲27.7	
