= 2026 Walsall Council election =

2026 English local government election

- 7 May 2026

All 60 seats to Walsall Council 31 seats needed for a majority
- Registered: 201,778
- Turnout: 79,192; 39.2%
	First party	Second party	Third party
Leader		Mike Bird defeated
Party	Reform	Conservative	WCIP
Last election	0 seats, 8.8%	37 seats, 37.1%	Did not exist
Seats before	0	31	0
Seats won	40	10	8
Seat change	▲40	▼21	▲8
Popular vote	80,225	49,091	18,925
Percentage	37.3%	22.8%	8.8%
Swing	▲28.5%	▼14.3%	N/A
	Fourth party	Fifth party	Sixth party
Leader	Matt Ward defeated	Aftab Nawaz
Party	Labour	Independent	Advance UK
Last election	14 seats, 34.5%	9 seats, 13.0%	Did not exist
Seats before	11	11	1
Seats won	1	1	0
Seat change	▼10	▼10	▼1
Popular vote	30,268	8,603	1,324
Percentage	14.1%	4.0%	0.6%
Swing	▼20.4%	▼9.0%	N/A
	Seventh party
Party	Your Party
Last election	Did not exist
Seats before	6
Seats won	0
Seat change	▼6
Popular vote	Did not stand
Percentage	Did not stand
Swing	N/A
Leader before election
Mike Bird
Conservative
No overall control
Leader after election
Elaine Williams
Reform

The 2026 Walsall Council election was held on 7 May 2026, alongside the other local elections across the United Kingdom being held on the same day. This council is divided into 20 wards, with each having 3 councillors. All 60 members of Walsall Council were elected.

Prior to the election, the council had been under no overall control since February 2026, when defections saw the Conservatives lose the majority they had previously held. Reform UK, which held no seats on the council prior to the election, won 40 of the 60 seats, giving them an overall majority. The incumbent Conservative leader of the council, Mike Bird, lost his seat. The new Reform group chose Elaine Williams to be its group leader. She was formally appointed as the new leader of the council at the subsequent annual council meeting on 21 May 2026.

== Background ==
Since its creation in 1974, Walsall has varied between the Conservatives and Labour. Between 1973 and 2004, Walsall had been under Labour control from 1973 to 1976, 1980 to 1982, 1988 to 1992, 1995 to 1996, and 1999 to 2000. It was then under Conservative control between 2004 and 2011, before reverting to no overall control and being retaken by the Conservatives in 2019.

In the 2024 elections, the Conservatives retained all 12 seats up for election, receiving 37.1% of the vote, Labour gained 1 seat with 34.5%, Independent candidates, mainly pro-Gaza independents, received 13%, Reform UK received 8.8%, and the Liberal Democrats received 3.2%.

Due to boundary changes, all seats on the council were up for election.

== Previous council composition ==
After 2024 election		Before 2026 election		After 2026 election	
Party	Seats	Party	Seats	Party	Seats
Conservative	37	Conservative	29	Conservative	10
Labour	14	Labour	11	Labour	1
Independent	9	Independent	12	Independent	9
		Your Party	6	Your Party	0
		Reform	1	Reform	40
		Advance UK	1	Advance UK	0

== Best Performance by Party ==
Best Performance by Party 2026 (%)
Party	Ward	Votes	%	+/-
Conservative	Aldridge Central & South	1,895	39.4	-20.5
Labour	Willenhall South	1,378	38.4	-29.7
Independent	Palfrey	1,419	26.8	-21.6
WCIP	Pleck	1,698	37.9	+37.9
Reform	Bloxwich West	2,132	57.8	+39.9
Liberal Democrats	New Invention	393	9.7	-2.6
Green	Paddock	1,011	21.2	-5.3
Advance UK	Pelsall	468	8.6	+8.63

== Electoral Process ==
In Walsall, each year, one councillor from every ward stands for re-election. In the fourth year, no elections take place, which is what happened in 2025. The previous election took place in 2024. The election will take place by multi-member first-past-the-post voting, with each ward being represented by three councillors. Electors will have as many votes as there are councillors to be elected in their ward, with the top three being elected.

However, the Conservative Councillor Waheed Rasab, who represents the Paddock ward, has called for the introduction of all-out local elections every four years "indefinitely", rather than the current practice of annual elections. Councillor Rasab states that the current process is significantly more expensive and takes money, over £250,000 each year, away from frontline services, adding that there is no ‘compelling need’ to hold elections every year.

Walsall Council have stated that “To change how often elections take place in Walsall, a resolution must be passed by at least two-thirds of all voting councillors at a specially convened meeting... the council must engage with key stakeholders and other persons on any proposed changes. This would likely include elected members, community leaders and residents." And that, as 2026 is an all-out election, this would likely be the starting point for any new arrangements.

At the previous Local Government Boundary Commission for England (LGBCE) consultation, it was found that there was little interest to change the current system.

=== Issues with the selection process ===
In 2025, the Aldridge Brownhills Conservative Association faced criticism over its candidate selection process for the May 2026 local elections. Nine sitting Conservative councillors in Walsall were prevented from standing as candidates and subsequently lodged appeals by the 1 August deadline. Decisions on the appeals were issued on 15 October.

Seven of the nine appeals were upheld, allowing those councillors to proceed to Stage 1 interviews, while two appeals were dismissed, including those of Councillor Rasab and Councillor Ali. Ten prospective new candidates who also appealed their rejection were unsuccessful. Councillor Vera Waters, councillor for Rushall-Shelfield, stated that there was no “logical explanation” for the deselections.

== Leadership of Walsall Council ==
Since the 2024 Local Elections, Walsall Council has seen the departure of Mike Bird, who was originally suspended amid allegations of racism and anti-Asian bullying, of which he has been cleared. At the Annual General Meeting, Bird executed a putsch and took his entire Tory cabinet with him to form a separate “Conservative and Independent” group. Councillor Bird resigned as council leader in June 2024. Councillor Garry Perry was elected as Leader of Walsall Council on 3 June 2024, following the resignation of Councillor Mike Bird. However, Garry Perry quit on 21 May 2025, claiming he’d experienced 'political attrition, deliberate undermining, and bullying dressed up as politics'.

Following the resignation, deputy leader Councillor Adrian Andrew took on the role as acting leader until a new one was chosen by the Conservative Group. On 5 June 2025, Councillor Mike Bird was elected leader of the Conservative Group on Walsall Council, marking the sixth time he has held this position since first becoming a councillor for Pheasey Park Farm in 1980. He was formally reappointed as leader of the council at a meeting on 10 June 2025.

== Councillors Defections & Resignations ==
Since the 2024 local elections, there have been a series of defections and resignations.

=== Shakila Hussain ===
On 2 July 2024, Shakila Hussain, the Labour councillor for Palfrey and Walsall’s first Bengali councillor, resigned from the Labour Party following remarks made by party leader Sir Keir Starmer regarding Bangladeshi migrants. In her resignation statement, Hussain said she could not remain a member of a party which she believed was “scapegoating an entire nationality to pander to voters”. She confirmed that her resignation from the Labour Party took effect immediately.

=== Stacie Elson ===
Councillor Stacie Elson left the Walsall Conservative Group following her formal resignation on Tuesday 6 May 2025. She stated that she was “extremely disappointed” with the conduct of the council leader at the time, Councillor Garry Perry, which prompted her to quit the group. After a change in leadership at Walsall Council, she sought to rejoin the Conservative Group, but her application was not accepted by its members.

=== Jade Chapman ===
In September 2025, Jade Chapman, a Walsall councillor, resigned from the Conservative Party and subsequently joined Advance UK. Her resignation followed her attendance at the Unite the Kingdom march in London on 13 September 2025, organised by Tommy Robinson.

=== Paul and Chris Bott ===
On 11 November 2025, Labour councillors Paul Bott and Chris Bott, who represent the Darlaston South ward, resigned from the Labour Party following a dispute over a £20 million allocation of government funding. The councillors cited dissatisfaction with the handling of the funding process by Pat McFadden, the Labour MP for Wolverhampton South East, and Matt Ward, leader of the Walsall Labour Group. The Botts also raised concerns about a lack of diversity on the board overseeing the funding, stating that there were no resident representatives from Rough Hay, Kings Hill, or Moxley. Councillor Chris Bott said that both she and Paul Bott would continue to advocate for a community-led approach to the funding.

=== Vera Waters ===
Vera Waters announced her resignation from the Conservative Party on 24 November 2025. She was the fourth Conservative councillor in Walsall to resign. In her resignation statement, Waters said the party had “lost its way”. Waters stated that her decision followed a series of incidents, including an unresolved issue involving another councillor. She also cited the decision of the Aldridge Brownhills Conservative Association to prevent her from standing as a candidate in the following year’s local elections. Councillor Waters states her intention to stand in the 2026 Local Elections.

=== Izzy Hussain, Amo Hussain & Gaz Ali ===
In January 2026, three Walsall councillors resigned from the Conservative Party following disputes over candidate selections for the May 2026 local elections. Gaz Ali and Amo Hussain, councillors for Birchills Leamore, and Izzy Hussain, councillor for Blakenall, all resigned on 13 January. In a joint statement, they cited the treatment of fellow councillors by the Aldridge Brownhills Conservative Association, including Keith Sears, who was among nine sitting councillors not approved as candidates despite having served for 50 consecutive years. The councillors stated that they had resigned from the party “with immediate effect”.

=== Keith Sears ===
On 17 February 2026, Keith Sears, Councillor for Aldridge North and Walsall Wood, quit the Conservative Party following ongoing issues with the selection process. Initially, Councillor Sears was among the nine sitting Conservative councillors who were not approved by the Aldridge Brownhills Association. Cllr Sears appealed the decision and was offered a second selection interview but turned it down "as he knew the outcome would be the same". Cllr Sears described the Aldridge Brownhills Conservative Association as having a "death wish" and stated that the "association has ruined Aldridge". This marks the eighth councillor to resign from the group in the last 12 months, and saw the Conservatives lose their majority on the council, placing it under no overall control.

== By-Election ==
The Pelsall by-election took place on 11 September 2025, following Councillor Gary Perry’s resignation from office. Graham Eardley won the by-election in the Pelsall ward with just over 45% of the vote, while the Conservatives came second on 43%, a margin of just 55 votes between the two parties. This marked the first occasion on which a Reform UK councillor was elected to the council.

In the aftermath of this election, Jade Chapman and Lee Chapman, who was the Conservative Party candidate, quit the Conservative Party amid claims of bullying following their attendance at the "Unite the Kingdom" rally, hosted by Tommy Robinson. Since, both have been appointed as regional directors of Advance UK.

=== Pelsall By-Election Result ===
Party	Candidate	Votes	%	+/-
Reform UK	Graham Eardley	1,231	45.1	+31.3%
Conservative	Lee Chapman	1,176	43.1	-24.1%
Green	Joe Belcher	127	4.7	+4.7%
Labour	Hannah Jones	125	4.6	-14.5%
Liberal Democrats	Daniel Barker	72	2.6	+2.6%

=== Predictions ===
On 13 March 2026, BirminghamLive published an article citing an AI election model by Bombe predicting that Nigel Farage’s party would “seize control of Sandwell and Walsall”, with a “massive majority” in Walsall. The projection suggests 48 Reform seats, alongside nine Conservative and three ‘other’. The model is benchmarked against real-world election results and claims to have correctly called 85% of the last 20 by-elections.

On 15 April 2026, JL Partners released an MRP poll projecting Reform on 43.8% in Walsall, well ahead of Labour in second place on 19.5%. The full results are as follows:

Party	%	+/-
Reform	43.8	+35.0
Labour	19.5	-15.0
Conservative	17.2	-19.9
Liberal Democrats	8.4	+5.2
Green	6.1	+2.8
Other (inc. IND)	5.0	-8.2

== Election result ==
Council composition after the 2024 election

Council composition after the 2026 election

2026 Walsall Metropolitan Borough Council election
Party	Candidates	Seats	Gains	Losses	Net gain/loss	Seats %	Votes %	Votes	+/−
Reform	60	40	N/A	N/A	▲40	66.7	37.3	80,225	+28.5
Conservative	60	10	N/A	N/A	▼21	16.7	22.8	49,091	–14.3
WCIP	20	8	N/A	N/A	▲8	13.3	8.8	18,925	N/A
Labour	60	1	N/A	N/A	▼10	1.7	14.1	30,268	–20.4
Independent	17	1	N/A	N/A	▼10	1.7	4.0	8,603	–9.0
Green	53	0	N/A	N/A	Steady	0.0	11.7	25,084	+8.4
Liberal Democrats	7	0	N/A	N/A	Steady	0.0	0.7	1,447	–2.5
Advance UK	5	0	N/A	N/A	▼1	0.0	0.6	1,324	N/A
Your Party	0	0	N/A	N/A	▼6	0.0	N/A (Note: Did not stand candidates.)	N/A	N/A

== Ward results ==
=== Aldridge Central & South ===
Aldridge Central & South (3 seats)
Party	Candidate	Votes	%	±%
Conservative	Timothy Wilson*	1,895	42.4	–17.5
Conservative	John Murray	1,873	41.9	–18.0
Reform	Lucy Darby	1,719	38.5	+28.5
Reform	Jeffrey Robinson	1,684	37.7	+27.7
Conservative	Pardeep Kaur*	1,659	37.1	–22.8
Reform	Francis Perks	1,610	36.0	+26.0
Labour	Anna Brook	712	15.9	–8.6
Labour	Mark Bradley	496	11.1	–13.4
Green	Rebecca Fullerton	472	10.6	+4.9
Green	Jamie Clarson	461	10.3	+4.6
Labour	Nikita Sowan	415	9.3	–15.2
Green	Shaun McKenzie	404	9.0	+3.3
Turnout		4,828	46.6	+11.4
Registered electors		10,368		
Conservative hold				
Conservative hold				
Reform gain from Conservative				

=== Aldridge North & Walsall Wood ===
Aldridge North & Walsall Wood (3 seats)
Party	Candidate	Votes	%	±%
Reform	Lesley Lynch	1,696	43.8	+28.1
Reform	Ian Benton	1,681	43.4	+27.7
Conservative	Christine Edwards	1,524	39.4	–11.8
Conservative	Keith Sears*	1,456	37.6	–13.6
Reform	George Kyriacou	1,440	37.2	+21.5
Conservative	Connor McCormack	1,400	36.2	–15.0
Green	Tom Glibbery	416	10.8	+6.3
Green	Sam Kitchen	406	10.5	+6.0
Labour	Kelly Baker	399	10.3	–15.2
Green	Tanya Petrovic	361	9.3	+4.8
Labour	Patti Lane	322	8.3	–17.2
Labour	Sarmad Ali	293	7.6	–17.9
Independent	Vera Waters	214	5.5	N/A
Turnout		4,197	42.1	+14.4
Registered electors		9,964		
Reform gain from Conservative				
Reform gain from Conservative				
Conservative hold				

=== Beechdale, Leamore & Reedswood ===
Beechdale, Leamore & Reedswood (3 seats)
Party	Candidate	Votes	%
Reform	Matthew Eason	1,416	56.9
Reform	Stuart Lathe	1,336	53.7
Reform	Scott Simmons	1,323	53.1
Labour	Tina Jukes*	495	19.9
Green	Rebecca Dolphin	374	15.0
Labour	Elliot Pfebve	361	14.5
Labour	Pam Sheemar	361	14.5
Green	Darren Neville	295	11.8
Green	Steven Hayward	293	11.8
WCIP	Elizabeth Adekanye	283	11.4
Conservative	Jenny Bradley	276	11.1
WCIP	Nadine Hamilton	232	9.3
Conservative	Liam Murphy	217	8.7
Conservative	Lisa Turner	207	8.3
Turnout		2,793	29.2
Registered electors		9,581	
Reform win (new seat)			
Reform win (new seat)			
Reform win (new seat)			

=== Bentley & Darlaston North ===
Bentley & Darlaston North (3 seats)
Party	Candidate	Votes	%	±%
Reform	Michael Barker	1,249	41.7	+25.9
Reform	Paul Lunn	1,184	39.5	+23.7
Reform	Ramtirth Singh	1,013	33.8	+18.0
WCIP	Yasin Ahmed	667	22.3	N/A
WCIP	Nahid Ahmed	665	22.2	N/A
WCIP	Sajakat Ali	609	20.3	N/A
Labour	Adam Mohammed	597	19.9	–16.5
Labour	Louis Gill	594	19.8	–16.6
Labour	Lucie Nahal*	580	19.4	–17.0
Green	Hannah Burston	423	14.1	N/A
Green	Faisal Majeed	343	11.4	N/A
Green	Kaiser Majeed	298	9.9	N/A
Conservative	Anthony Jones	268	8.9	–6.0
Conservative	Manju Gill	232	7.7	–7.2
Conservative	Steven Turner	220	7.3	–7.6
Independent	Abdul Kalam	45	1.5	–1.4
Turnout		3,339	34.6	+7.3
Registered electors		9,664		
Reform gain from Labour				
Reform gain from Labour				
Reform gain from Your Party				

=== Bloxwich East & Blakenhall Heath ===
Bloxwich East & Blakenhall Heath (3 seats)
Party	Candidate	Votes	%
Reform	Aiden Clarke	1,643	54.6
Reform	Richard Tapper	1,521	50.6
Reform	David Sambrook	1,505	50.0
Conservative	Gary Flint	745	24.8
Conservative	Corin Statham	723	24.0
Conservative	Mark Statham	707	23.5
Labour	Thanh Huynh	413	13.7
Green	Jayne-Edgar Dragon	412	13.7
Labour	Kamran McDonald	382	13.7
Green	David Taylor	339	11.3
Labour	Ismail Mohammed	326	10.8
Green	Mike Walters	305	10.1
Turnout		3,284	34.2
Registered electors		9,591	
Reform win (new seat)			
Reform win (new seat)			
Reform win (new seat)			

=== Bloxwich West ===
Bloxwich West (3 seats)
Party	Candidate	Votes	%	±%
Reform	Nicky Barker	2,100	62.2	+44.3
Reform	Paul Nugent	1,918	56.8	+38.9
Reform	Tony Sadla	1,850	54.8	+36.9
Conservative	Louise Harrison*	824	24.4	–15.0
Conservative	Sean Boyle	736	21.8	–17.6
Conservative	Tracey Hateley	692	20.5	–18.9
Labour	Tayo Ladimine	362	10.7	–29.5
Labour	Imogen Margetts	355	10.5	–29.7
Green	Deborah Lee	352	10.4	N/A
Green	William Raby	336	10.0	N/A
Green	Adam Snape	302	8.9	N/A
Labour	Manjit Padda	301	8.9	–31.3
Turnout		3,659	38.9	+11.7
Registered electors		9,415		
Reform gain from Conservative				
Reform gain from Labour				
Reform gain from Conservative				

=== Brownhills ===
Brownhills (3 seats)
Party	Candidate	Votes	%	±%
Reform	Joshua Dixon	1,889	55.7	+39.0
Reform	Pete Sutton	1,642	48.4	+31.7
Reform	Aysha Nizamoglu	1,406	41.5	+24.8
Conservative	Ken Ferguson*	1,006	29.7	–14.3
Conservative	Kerry Murphy*	991	29.2	–14.8
Conservative	Carolyn Sault	767	22.6	–21.4
Green	Kathryn Smith	433	12.8	N/A
Labour	Stephen Jukes	351	10.4	–22.1
Advance UK	Martin Mason-Woodhouse	331	9.8	N/A
Green	Richard Harries	325	9.6	N/A
Green	Rowan Lavender	295	8.7	N/A
Labour	Bob Thomas	294	8.7	–23.8
Labour	Jay Wall	262	7.7	–24.8
Advance UK	Joanne Phillips	177	5.2	N/A
Turnout		3,697	37.9	+12.9
Registered electors		9,757		
Reform gain from Conservative				
Reform gain from Conservative				
Reform gain from Conservative				

=== Darlston South ===
Darlston South (3 seats)
Party	Candidate	Votes	%	±%
Reform	Peter Burton	1,490	50.9	+35.4
Reform	David Bailey	1,361	46.5	+31.0
Reform	Jenny Nock	1,269	43.4	+27.9
Independent	Chris Bott*	719	24.6	N/A
Independent	Paul Bott*	691	23.6	N/A
Labour	Ade Walker	664	22.7	–43.0
Labour	Amy Walker	644	22.0	–43.7
Labour	Matt Ward*	589	20.1	–45.6
Green	Liam Jones	451	15.4	N/A
Conservative	Parmajit Kaur	265	9.1	–5.6
Conservative	Balvinder Singh	232	7.9	–6.8
Conservative	Melvin Glasby	217	7.4	–7.3
Liberal Democrats	Sylwia Juranek	186	6.4	+2.2
Turnout		3,338	30.7	+7.7
Registered electors		10,865		
Reform gain from Independent				
Reform gain from Labour				
Reform gain from Independent				

=== Harden, Goscote & Ryecroft ===
Harden, Goscote & Ryecroft (3 seats)
Party	Candidate	Votes	%
Reform	Lisa Jones	1,044	47.1
Reform	Robin Perry	1,019	46.0
Reform	Tabbi Awotwe	929	41.9
Independent	Pete Smith*	804	36.3
WCIP	Mushtaq Khan	436	19.7
Labour	Lee Jeavons	407	18.4
Green	Yobba Baldeh	347	15.7
Green	Joseph Chandler	330	14.9
Labour	Robert Lipke	330	14.9
Labour	Ulrike Wilson	299	13.5
Green	Andrea Maynard	287	12.9
Conservative	Stephen Langford	147	6.6
Conservative	Susan Langford	136	6.1
Conservative	Anthony Dubberley	135	6.1
Turnout		2,769	28.9
Registered electors		9,569	
Reform win (new seat)			
Reform win (new seat)			
Reform win (new seat)			

=== New Invention ===
New Invention (3 seats)
Party	Candidate	Votes	%
Reform	Carl Creaney	1,537	48.0
Reform	Gill Mitchell	1,435	44.8
Reform	Daniel Rollinson	1,414	44.1
Conservative	Adam Hicken*	979	30.6
Labour	Tal Singh	811	25.3
Conservative	Rob Larden*	736	23.0
Conservative	Martin Washbrook	674	21.0
Labour	Iqbal Padda	652	20.4
Labour	Courtney Jukes	633	19.8
Liberal Democrats	Dan Barker	393	12.3
Independent	Stacie Elson*	346	10.8
Turnout		3,673	40.1
Registered electors		9,160	
Reform win (new seat)			
Reform win (new seat)			
Reform win (new seat)			

=== Paddock ===
Paddock (3 seats)
Party	Candidate	Votes	%	±%
Conservative	Gurmeet Singh Sohal*	1,423	31.5	–5.8
Conservative	Amrik Dhesy	1,361	30.2	–7.1
Conservative	Sawra Shmim	1,149	25.5	–11.8
WCIP	Amo Hussain	1,086	24.1	N/A
WCIP	Gaz Ali*	1,078	23.9	N/A
Green	Karam Sangha	1,011	22.4	+18.5
Green	Helen Neville	1,006	22.3	+18.4
WCIP	Israr Hussain	979	21.7	N/A
Green	Mish Rahman	933	20.7	+16.8
Reform	Mary Birch	731	16.2	+11.5
Reform	Brian Cusack	698	15.5	+10.8
Reform	Khan Rose	562	12.5	+7.8
Labour	Dean Margetts	518	11.5	–15.8
Labour	Klara Margetts*	514	11.4	–15.9
Labour	Muhammad Khan	491	10.9	–16.4
Turnout		4,798	49.0	+8.0
Registered electors		9,787		
Conservative hold				
Conservative hold				
Conservative hold				

=== Palfrey & The Delves ===
Palfrey & The Delves (3 seats)
Party	Candidate	Votes	%
WCIP	Dilu Miah	1,518	32.5
Independent	Ashfaq Ahmed	1,419	30.3
WCIP	Hajran Bashir*	1,394	29.8
Independent	Shakir Hussain	1,345	28.8
WCIP	Saiqa Nasreen*	1,291	27.6
Independent	Imran Ahmed	1,235	26.4
Green	Sadat Hussain	1,089	23.3
Green	Marc Batchford	568	12.1
Green	Mehvish Khatoon	520	11.1
Reform	Tony Simmons	512	10.9
Reform	Joshua Pope	507	10.8
Labour	Mohammed Musharaf	505	10.8
Labour	Wemi Agboaye	462	9.9
Reform	Ananya Sabharwal	439	9.4
Labour	Paul Graham	429	9.2
Conservative	Elizabeth Magee	272	5.8
Conservative	Nirmal Singh	271	5.8
Conservative	Bradley Fisher	255	5.5
Turnout		5,115	45.1
Registered electors		11,348	
WCIP win (new seat)			
Independent win (new seat)			
WCIP win (new seat)			

=== Pelsall ===
Pelsall (3 seats)
Party	Candidate	Votes	%	±%
Reform	Ann Ault	2,132	49.8	+36.0
Reform	Jim Parsons	1,996	46.6	+32.8
Conservative	Rose Martin*	1,486	34.7	–32.5
Conservative	Jonathan Elliott	1,446	33.7	–33.5
Reform	Faiza Hussain	1,360	31.7	+17.9
Conservative	Lorna Rattigan	1,320	30.8	–36.4
Green	James Rowley	522	12.2	N/A
Advance UK	Jade Chapman*	468	10.9	N/A
Green	Kath Jennings	433	10.1	N/A
Green	Jon Maltman	353	8.2	N/A
Independent	Graham Eardley*	327	7.6	N/A
Labour	Zoe Harrison	289	6.7	–12.3
Labour	John Foxall	266	6.2	–12.8
Labour	Lewis Norgrove	261	6.1	–12.9
Liberal Democrats	Matthew Barker	197	4.6	N/A
Turnout		4,716	42.8	+11.6
Registered electors		11,015		
Reform gain from Conservative				
Reform gain from Independent				
Conservative hold				

=== Pheasey Park Farm ===
Pheasey Park Farm (3 seats)
Party	Candidate	Votes	%	±%
Reform	Karen Griffiths	1,699	39.5	N/A
Conservative	Adrian Andrew*	1,677	38.9	–22.1
Reform	Christopher Hickey	1,602	37.2	N/A
Conservative	Mike Bird*	1,595	37.0	–24.0
Reform	Mark Wellings	1,542	35.8	N/A
Conservative	Sheeban Yasin	1,240	28.8	–32.2
Green	Laura Foreman	686	15.9	N/A
Green	Kieran Guice	583	13.5	N/A
Green	Arranjit Rangi	580	13.5	N/A
Labour	Toby Cashmore	543	12.6	–18.6
Labour	Jasvir Singh	489	11.4	–19.8
Labour	Colin Wilkes	441	10.2	–21.0
Advance UK	Ray Southam	131	3.0	N/A
Independent	Chris Newey	110	2.6	N/A
Turnout		4,677	46.1	+15.2
Registered electors		10,149		
Reform gain from Conservative				
Conservative hold				
Reform gain from Conservative				

=== Pleck ===
Pleck (3 seats)
Party	Candidate	Votes	%	±%
WCIP	Khizar Hussain*	1,698	42.8	N/A
WCIP	Ashraq Ahmad	1,601	40.4	N/A
WCIP	Basharat Hussain	1,581	39.9	N/A
Labour	Zulkifl Ahmed	933	23.5	–12.3
Labour	Ram Mehmi*	773	23.5	–12.3
Labour	Muhammad Miah	761	19.2	–16.3
Reform	Peter Faultless	701	17.7	N/A
Reform	Melissa Rooker	677	17.1	N/A
Reform	Joshua Sadla	597	15.1	N/A
Green	Matthew Harper	494	12.5	+5.5
Green	Yasin Dad	469	11.8	+4.8
Green	Khuram Mahmood	398	10.0	+3.0
Conservative	Mozamil Khan	364	9.2	–5.9
Conservative	Abdul Malik	244	6.2	–8.9
Conservative	Salek Miah	221	5.6	–9.5
Independent	Ifrahim Tabassum	201	5.1	N/A
Liberal Democrats	Jagadees Nair	95	2.4	N/A
Independent	Kashif Meher	80	2.0	N/A
Turnout		4,310	39.9	+3.9
Registered electors		10,815		
WCIP gain from Your Party				
WCIP gain from Labour				
WCIP gain from Your Party				

=== Rushall-Shelfield ===
Rushall-Shelfield (3 seats)
Party	Candidate	Votes	%	±%
Reform	Stuart Chapman	1,610	42.5	+28.7
Reform	Irene Henery	1,525	40.3	+26.5
Reform	Barbara McCracken	1,506	39.8	+26.0
Conservative	Elliot Benton	752	19.9	–21.9
Conservative	Michelle Coles	739	19.5	–22.3
Green	Raja Ateeq	719	19.0	+11.9
Green	Joe Belcher	677	17.9	+10.8
Conservative	Daniel Kirk	662	17.5	–24.3
Green	Julie Skellern	628	16.6	+9.5
Labour	James Harrison	625	16.5	–20.8
Labour	Edward Assamoah-Cobbiah	606	16.0	–21.3
Labour	Sam Fletcher	575	15.2	–22.1
WCIP	David Morgan	290	7.7	N/A
WCIP	Aadam Oates	233	6.2	N/A
Independent	Jason Goher	205	5.4	N/A
Turnout		4,076	38.5	+10.6
Registered electors		10,596		
Reform gain from Advance UK				
Reform gain from Independent				
Reform gain from Conservative				

=== Short Heath ===
Short Heath (3 seats)
Party	Candidate	Votes	%	±%
Reform	Rohan Beecha	1,775	49.5	N/A
Reform	Bella Simon	1,768	49.3	N/A
Reform	Elaine Williams	1,727	48.2	N/A
Conservative	Amandeep Garcha*	1,218	34.0	–12.8
Conservative	Poonam Gill*	1,148	32.0	–14.8
Conservative	Joshua Whitehouse*	1,119	31.2	–15.6
Labour	Elouise Francis	380	10.6	–28.9
Labour	Leah Martin	303	8.5	–31.0
Green	Liam Allen	299	8.3	N/A
Labour	Gerard Lyng	281	7.8	–31.7
Green	Cally Russon	274	7.6	N/A
Liberal Democrats	Benjamin Hodges	250	7.0	–6.8
Liberal Democrats	Simon Rollason	211	5.9	–7.9
Turnout		3,988	39.8	+12.6
Registered electors		10,018		
Reform gain from Conservative				
Reform gain from Conservative				
Reform gain from Conservative				

=== St Matthew's ===
St Matthew's (3 seats)
Party	Candidate	Votes	%	±%
WCIP	Aftab Nawaz*	1,116	35.7	N/A
WCIP	Mushtaq Ahmed	1,105	35.4	N/A
WCIP	Basharat Hussain	1,063	34.0	N/A
Conservative	Frank Uddin	631	20.2	–1.4
Green	Katharine Morgan	614	19.6	+12.5
Green	Scott Mabbutt	599	19.2	+12.1
Green	Adeel Riaz	548	17.5	+10.4
Labour	Eileen Russell*	486	15.6	–18.9
Independent	Jamal Ahmed	426	13.6	N/A
Reform	Michael Dimkpa	403	12.9	+6.0
Labour	Chris Williams	399	12.8	–21.7
Labour	Ewan Thornton	390	12.5	–22.0
Reform	Gabriel Obasa	373	11.9	+6.0
Reform	Enoch Oyeduntan	346	11.1	+4.2
Independent	Akhter Ali	341	10.9	N/A
Conservative	Khalid Khan	277	8.9	–12.7
Conservative	Sajid Mahmood	258	8.3	–13.3
Turnout		3,407	39.3	+2.1
Registered electors		8,668		
WCIP gain from Your Party				
WCIP gain from Independent				
WCIP gain from Labour				

=== Streetly ===
Streetly (3 seats)
Party	Candidate	Votes	%	±%
Reform	Alan Fleming	2,087	46.3	+38.4
Conservative	Amanda Parkes	1,894	42.0	–18.5
Conservative	Kara Babb	1,723	38.2	–22.3
Reform	Matt Matloob	1,650	36.6	+28.7
Conservative	Vandana Sharma*	1,525	33.8	–26.7
Reform	Mani Panchhi	1,482	32.9	+25.0
Green	Pam Walters	608	13.5	+8.7
Labour	Sarah Jeavons	581	12.9	–9.1
Labour	Shaun Fitzpatrick	565	12.5	–9.5
Green	Aaron Pooni	559	12.4	+7.6
Labour	Nikita Goldsmith	545	12.5	–9.5
Advance UK	Adrian Hutton	217	4.8	N/A
Independent	Thomas Yoong	95	2.1	N/A
Turnout		5,141	46.8	+11.4
Registered electors		10,981		
Reform gain from Conservative				
Conservative hold				
Conservative hold				

=== Willenhall ===
Whitehall (3 seats)
Party	Candidate	Votes	%
Reform	Peter Harrison	1,449	48.8
Labour	Simran Cheema	1,378	46.4
Reform	Roy Tandy	1,257	42.4
Reform	Parvesh Kumar	1,189	40.1
Labour	Natalie Latham	892	30.1
Labour	Harj Nahal	887	29.9
Green	Aleena Khan	328	11.1
Conservative	Barbara Haig	323	10.9
Conservative	Colleen Jones	295	9.9
Green	Toyin Oshaniwa	268	9.0
Conservative	Gail Jordan	264	8.9
Green	Shakir Khan	258	8.7
Liberal Democrats	Leandra Gebrakedan	115	3.9
Turnout		3,387	32.4
Registered electors		10,467	
Reform win (new seat)			
Labour win (new seat)			
Reform win (new seat)			
