= 2021 Walsall Metropolitan Borough Council election =

Election of members of Walsall Council in England

- 6 May 2021

21 of 60 seats on Walsall Council 31 seats needed for a majority

	First party	Second party	Third party
Leader	Mike Bird	Aftab Nawaz	n/a
Party	Conservative	Labour	Independent
Seats before	36	25	2
Seats after	36	22	2
Seat change	Steady	▼3	Steady
	Fourth party
Leader	n/a
Party	Liberal Democrats
Seats before	2
Seats after	0
Seat change	▼2

The 2021 Walsall Metropolitan Borough Council election took place on 6 May 2021 to elect members of Walsall Council in England. This was on the same day as the 2021 elections for the West Midlands Police and Crime Commissioner, and the 2021 West Midlands mayoral election. These elections had been delayed from May 2020 due to the COVID-19 pandemic in the United Kingdom.

One-third of the seats were up for election, with one ward (Pelsall) electing three councillors.

== Background ==
Since its creation in 1974, Walsall has varied between the Conservatives and Labour. Between 1973 and 2004, Walsall had been under Labour control from 1973 to 1976, 1980 to 1982, 1988 to 1992, 1995 to 1996, and 1999 to 2000. It was then under Conservative control between 2004 and 2011, before reverting to no overall control and being retaken by the Conservatives in 2019. In the 2019 elections, the Conservatives gained 2 seats with 41% of the vote, Labour lost 2 with 38%, and the UKIP received 10.5% of the vote. Despite Conservative losses across the UK, the Conservative Party gained control of this council.

The seats up for election this year were last elected in 2016. In that election, the Labour Party gained 1 seat, with 43.2% of the vote, the Conservatives received 36.6%, and UKIP received 11.7%. This election was held prior to the 2016 EU Referendum.

== Results ==
2021 Walsall Metropolitan Borough Council election
Party	This election				Full council			This election		
Party	Candidates	Seats	Net	Seats %	Other	Total	Total %	Votes	Votes %	+/−
Conservative	{{{candidates}}}	14	▲5	63.6	22	37	60.0	35,778	54.1	+13.1
Labour	{{{candidates}}}	7	▼3	31.8	15	22	36.7	24,048	36.3	-1.7
Independent	{{{candidates}}}	1	Steady	4.5	1	2	3.3	805	1.2	-2.1
Liberal Democrats	{{{candidates}}}	0	▼2	0.0	0	0	0.0	2,967	2.5	-1.2
Green	{{{candidates}}}	0	Steady	0.0	0	0	0.0	1,788	2.7	+1.3
Reform	{{{candidates}}}	0	Steady	0.0	0	0	0.0	775	1.2	New

== Ward results ==
=== Aldridge Central and South ===
Aldridge Central and South
Party	Candidate	Votes	%	±%
Conservative	Tim Wilson	3,498	76.28	▲19.63
Labour	Shaz Akhtar	648	14.13	▼2.27
Green	Guan Chan	241	5.26	N/A
Liberal Democrats	Jonathan Bates	199	4.34	▼2.39
Majority		2,850	62.15	
Turnout		4,586		
Registered electors				
Conservative hold		Swing		

=== Aldridge North and Walsall Wood ===
Aldridge North and Walsall Wood
Party	Candidate	Votes	%	±%
Conservative	Keith Sears	2,321	71.53	
Labour	Michael Bruce	609	18.77	
Green	Tanya Petrovic	161	4.96	
Liberal Democrats	Isaac Crosby	154	4.75	
Majority		1,712	52.76	
Turnout		3,245		
Registered electors				
Conservative hold		Swing		

=== Bentley and Darlaston North ===
Bentley and Darlaston North
Party	Candidate	Votes	%	±%
Labour	Angela Underhill	1,399	56.23	
Conservative	Sukhy Nijjar	1,089	43.77	
Majority		310	12.46	
Turnout		2,488		
Registered electors				
Labour hold		Swing		

=== Birchills-Leamore ===
Birchills-Leamore
Party	Candidate	Votes	%	±%
Conservative	Amo Hussain	1,586	54.45	
Labour	Tina Jukes	1,060	36.39	
Green	Kevin Pitt	102	3.50	
Reform	Elaine Williams	99	3.40	
Liberal Democrats	Paul Wild	66	2.27	
Majority		526	18.06	
Turnout		2,913		
Registered electors				
Conservative gain from Labour		Swing		

=== Blakenall ===
Blakenall
Party	Candidate	Votes	%	±%
Independent	Pete Smith	805	37.79	
Labour	Matt Ward	792	37.18	
Conservative	Saghir Mohammed	533	25.02	
Majority		13	0.61	
Turnout		2,130		
Registered electors				
Independent gain from Labour		Swing		

=== Bloxwich East ===
Bloxwich East
Party	Candidate	Votes	%	±%
Conservative	Gary Flint	1,385	60.53	
Labour	Kath Phillips	903	39.47	
Majority		482	21.07	
Turnout		2,288		
Registered electors				
Conservative gain from Labour		Swing		

=== Bloxwich West ===
Bloxwich West
Party	Candidate	Votes	%	±%
Conservative	Brad Allen	1,892	67.1	
Labour	David Morgan	728	25.8	
Liberal Democrats	Stuart Hodges	113	4.0	
Reform	Robert Matthews	88	3.1	
Majority		1,164	42.3	
Turnout				
Registered electors				
Conservative hold		Swing		

=== Brownhills ===
Brownhills
Party	Candidate	Votes	%	±%
Conservative	Kerry Murphy	1,526	55.0	
Labour	Steve Wade	953	34.3	
Reform	Lee Chapman	162	5.8	
Green	Phil Parker	88	3.2	
Liberal Democrats	Hamza Karim	46	1.7	
Majority		573	20.7	
Conservative gain from Labour		Swing		

=== Darlaston South ===
Darlaston South
Party	Candidate	Votes	%	±%
Labour	Chris Bott	1,533	63.7	
Conservative	Derek Bennett	873	36.3	
Majority		660		
Labour hold		Swing		

=== Paddock ===
Paddock
Party	Candidate	Votes	%	±%
Conservative	Nick Gandham	2,194	52.6	
Labour	Nasar Ali	1,759	42.1	
Liberal Democrats	Roger Watts	222	5.3	
Majority		435		
Conservative hold		Swing		

=== Palfrey ===
Palfrey
Party	Candidate	Votes	%	±%
Labour	Sabina Ditta	2,519	65.8	
Conservative	Moz Khan	1,307	34.2	
Majority		1,212		
Labour hold		Swing		

=== Pelsall ===
Three seats available.

Pelsall
Party	Candidate	Votes	%	±%
Conservative	Garry Perry	2,208	32.5	
Conservative	Rose Martin	1,436	21.2	
Conservative	Ed Lee	1,430	21.1	
Labour	Jon Maltman	495	7.3	
Labour	Patti Lane	381	5.6	
Labour	Shamim Ahmed	319	4.7	
Green	Deborah Lee	275	4.1	
Reform	Graham Eardley	242	3.6	
Majority				
Conservative hold		Swing		
Conservative hold		Swing		
Conservative hold		Swing		

=== Pheasey Park Farm ===
Pheasey Park Farm
Party	Candidate	Votes	%	±%
Conservative	Adrian Andrew	2,156	71.1	
Labour	Trish White	650	21.4	
Green	Andrea Maynard	128	4.2	
Liberal Democrats	Matthew Barker	99	3.3	
Majority		1,506		
Conservative hold		Swing		

=== Pleck ===
Pleck
Party	Candidate	Votes	%	±%
Labour	Naheed Gultasib	2,310	74.8	
Conservative	Jitu Miah	778	25.2	
Majority		1,532		
Labour hold		Swing		

=== Rushall-Shelfield ===
Rushall-Shelfield
Party	Candidate	Votes	%	±%
Labour	Richard Worrall	1,426	50.1	
Conservative	Sawra Shmim	1,239	43.5	
Reform	Jade Davies	184	6.5	
Majority		187		
Labour hold		Swing		

=== Short Heath ===
Short Heath
Party	Candidate	Votes	%	±%
Conservative	Josh Whitehouse	1,353	54.1	
Liberal Democrats	Daniel Barker	608	24.3	
Labour	Elliot Pfebve	539	21.6	
Majority		745	29.8	
Conservative gain from Liberal Democrats		Swing		

=== Streetly ===
Streetly
Party	Candidate	Votes	%	±%
Conservative	Keir Pedley	2,904	67.9	
Labour	Michael Coulson	678	15.8	
Liberal Democrats	Jennifer Gray	493	11.5	
Green	Alison Walters	205	4.8	
Majority		2,226		
Conservative hold		Swing		

=== St Matthews ===
St Matthews
Party	Candidate	Votes	%	±%
Labour	Abdus Nazir	2,162	50.8	
Conservative	Mohammed Yaqoob	1,565	36.8	
Green	Michael Walters	525	12.3	
Majority		597		
Labour hold		Swing		

=== Willenhall North ===
Willenhall North
Party	Candidate	Votes	%	±%
Conservative	Stacie Elson	1,276	46.0	
Liberal Democrats	Ian Shires	825	29.8	
Labour	Stephen Moreton	608	21.9	
Green	Carl Harrison	63	2.3	
Majority		451		
Conservative gain from Liberal Democrats		Swing		

=== Willenhall South ===
Willenhall South
Party	Candidate	Votes	%	±%
Labour	Sean Coughlan	1,577	53.5	
Conservative	Amandeep Kaur Garcha	1,229	41.7	
Liberal Democrats	Ben Hodges	142	4.8	
Majority		348		
Labour hold		Swing		

== By-elections ==
=== Pleck ===
Pleck: 16 December 2021
Party	Candidate	Votes	%	±%
Labour	Simran Cheema	698	64.6	−10.2
Conservative	Mohammed Saghir	382	35.4	+10.2
Majority		316	29.2	
Turnout		1,080		
Labour hold		Swing	▼10.2	
