= Walsall Housing Group =

Walsall Housing Group Limited (or whg) is a not-for-profit housing association. It was founded in March 2003 and is currently responsible for more than 21,000 homes, primarily in the borough of Walsall, West Midlands. These homes were previously controlled by the Metropolitan Borough of Walsall, but were transferred to the housing group following a vote among tenants in 2003.
