= 2014 Walsall Metropolitan Borough Council election =

2014 UK local government election

Map of the results

The 2014 Walsall Metropolitan Borough Council election took place on 22 May 2014 to elect members of Walsall Metropolitan Borough Council in England. This was on the same day as other local elections.
