= Metropolitan Borough of Walsall =

Borough of Walsall
- Metropolitan borough
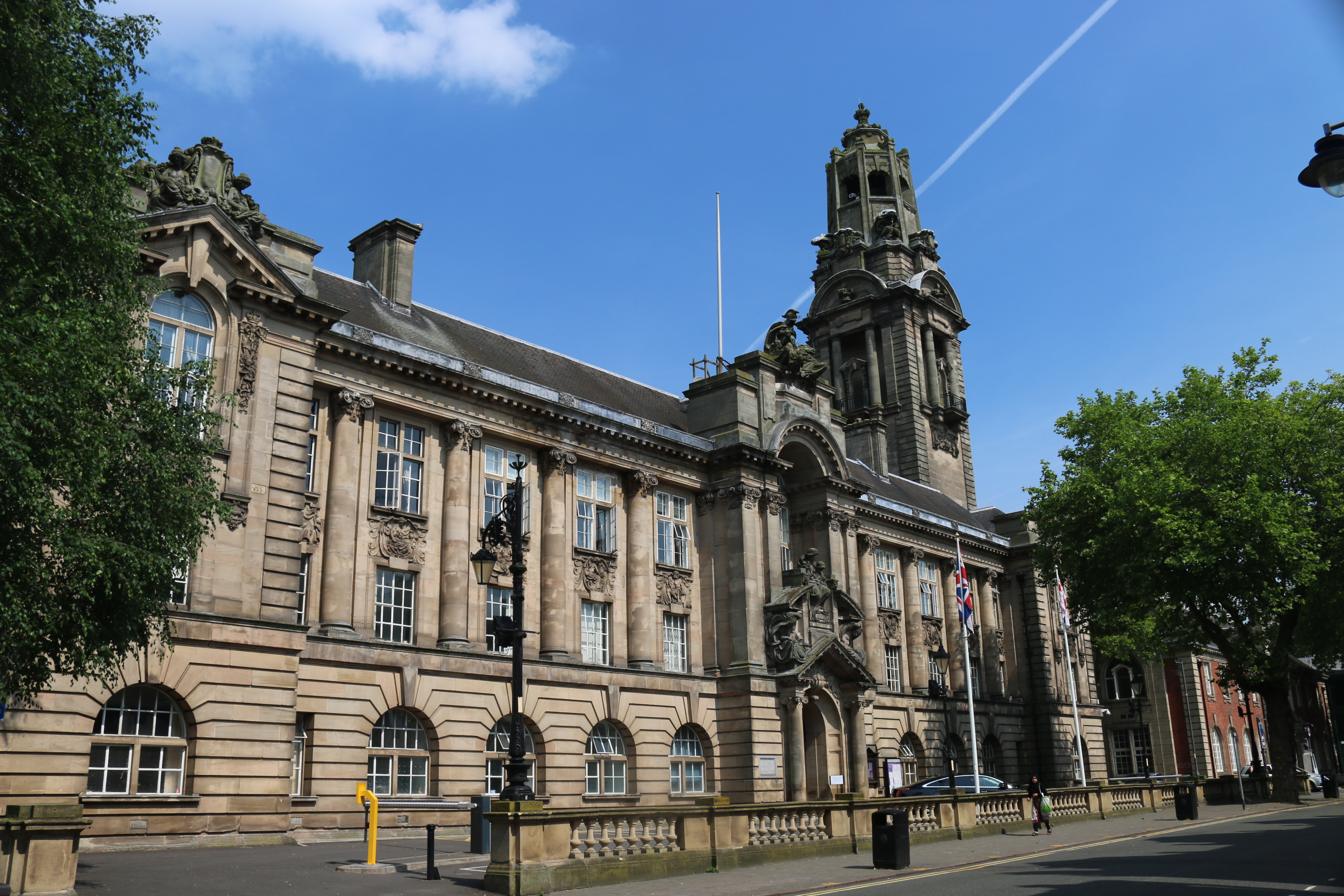
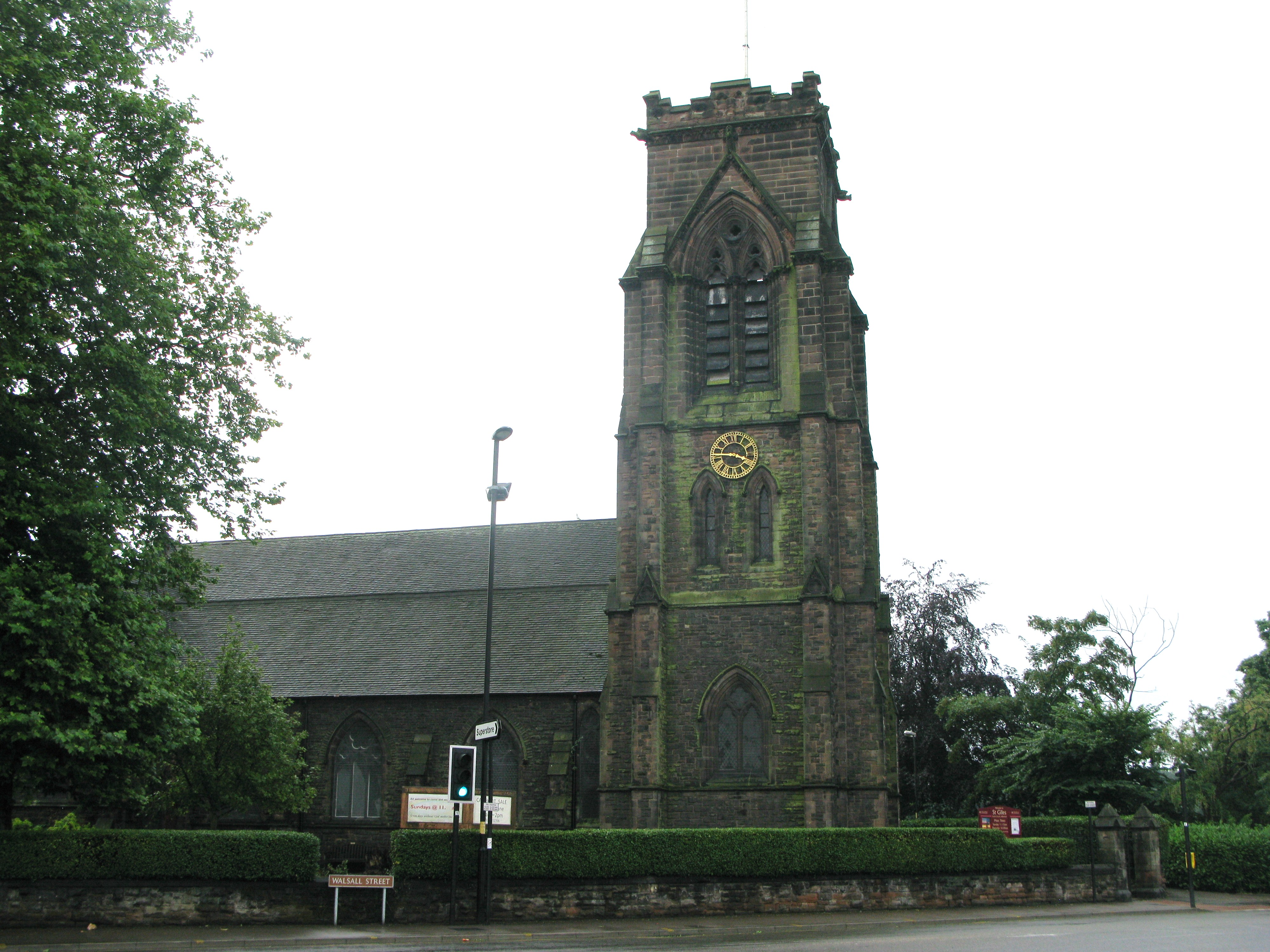
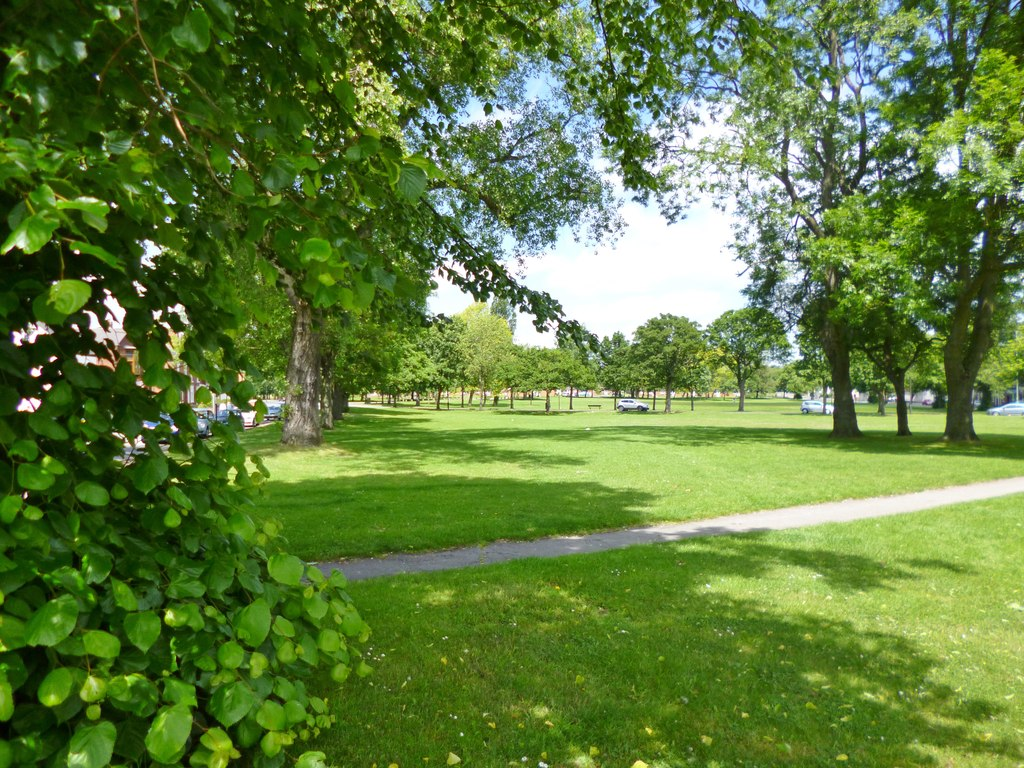
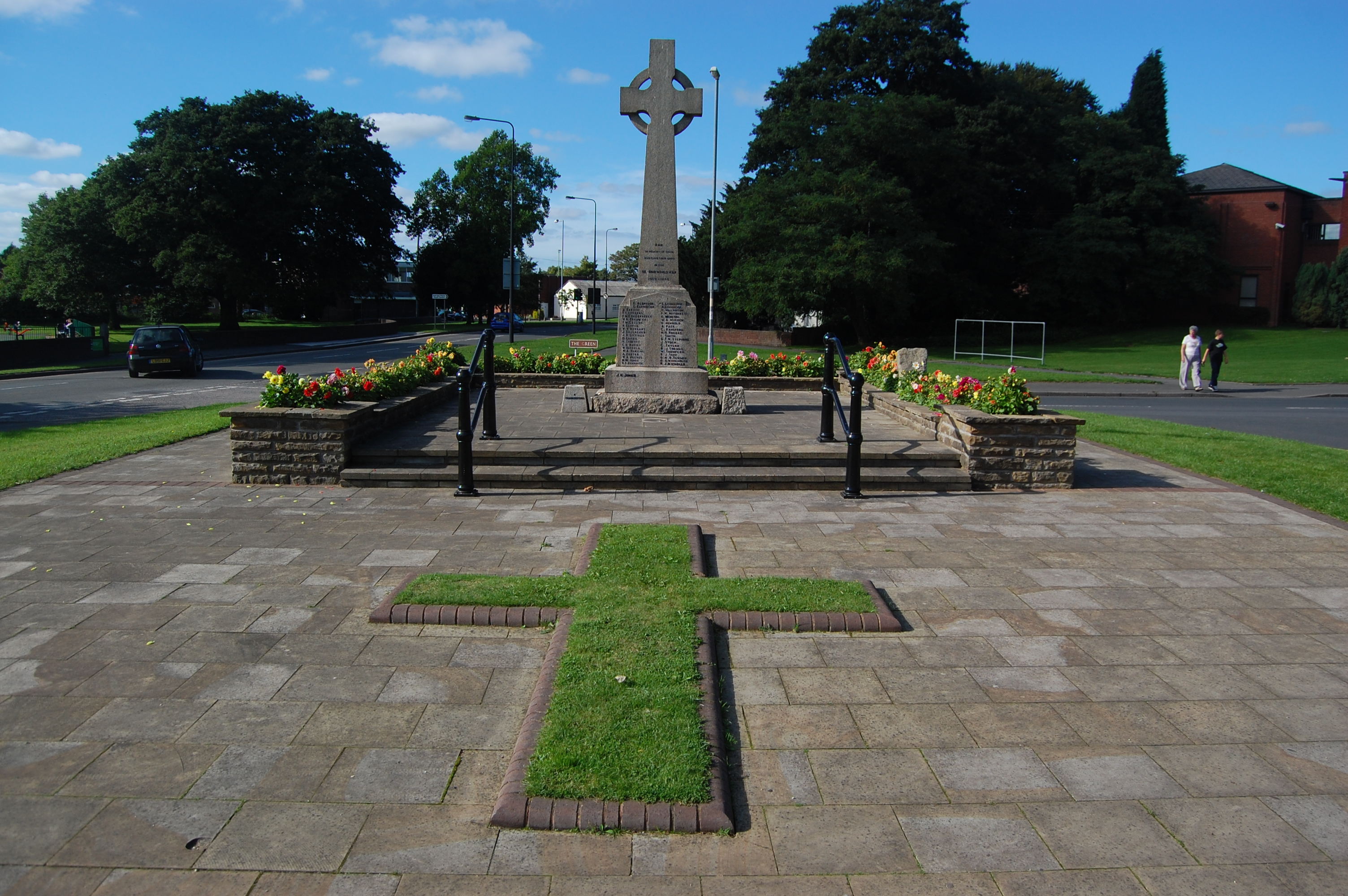
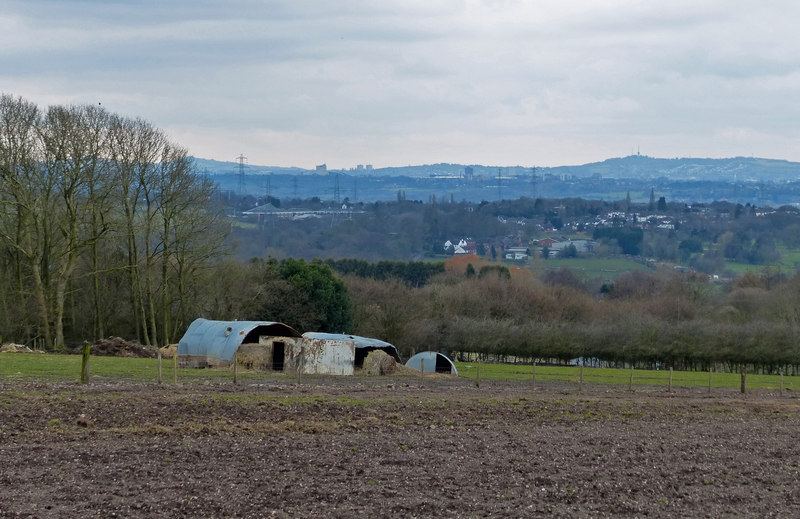
- From left to right; Top: Walsall Council House; Middle: Willenhall St Giles Church and Pelsall Common; Bottom: Aldridge War Memorial and Barr Beacon

- Coat of arms

- Walsall shown within the West Midlands and England
- Coordinates: 52°34′48″N 1°58′48″W
- Sovereign state: United Kingdom
- Constituent country: England
- Region: West Midlands
- Metropolitan county: West Midlands
- Historic county: Staffordshire
- Admin HQ: Walsall
- Metropolitan borough status: 1 April 1974

Government
  - Type: Metropolitan borough
  - Governing body: Walsall Metropolitan Borough Council
  - Mayor: Chris Towe
  - MPs: Valerie Vaz (L); Wendy Morton (C); Sureena Brackenridge (L); Pat McFadden (L)

Area
  - Total: 40.14 sq mi (103.95 km^{2})

Population (2024)
  - Total: 295,678 (Ranked 55th)
  - Density: 6,943/sq mi (2,681/km^{2})

Ethnicity (2021)
  - Ethnic groups: List: 71.4% White; 18.7% Asian; 3.3% Mixed; 4.6% Black; 2.1% other

Religion (2021)
  - Religion: List: 47.1% Christianity; 31.9% no religion; 11.9% Islam; 1.9% Hinduism; 0.1% Judaism; 6.4% Sikhism; 0.2% Buddhism; 0.6% other; 0.1% not stated
- Time zone: UTC+0 (GMT)
  - Summer (DST): UTC+1 (BST)
- Postcode: WS (1–6, 8–10) WV (12, 13, 14) B (43, 74)
- Area codes: 01922, 01902, 01543 & 0121
- ISO 3166-2: GB-WLL
- ONS code: 00CU (ONS); E08000030 (GSS)
- OS grid reference: SP015985
- NUTS 3: UKG35
- Website: www.walsall.gov.uk

The Metropolitan Borough of Walsall is a metropolitan borough in the West Midlands, England. It is named after its largest settlement, Walsall, but covers a larger area which also includes Aldridge, Bloxwich, Brownhills, Darlaston, Pelsall and Willenhall.

The borough had an estimated population of 254,500 in 2007.

The borough was created on 1 April 1974 under the Local Government Act 1972. It is bounded on the west by the City of Wolverhampton, the south by the Metropolitan Borough of Sandwell, to the south east by the City of Birmingham, and by the Staffordshire districts of Lichfield, Cannock Chase and South Staffordshire to the east, north and northwest respectively. Most of the borough is highly industrialised and densely populated, but areas around the north and east of the borough are open space.

== History ==
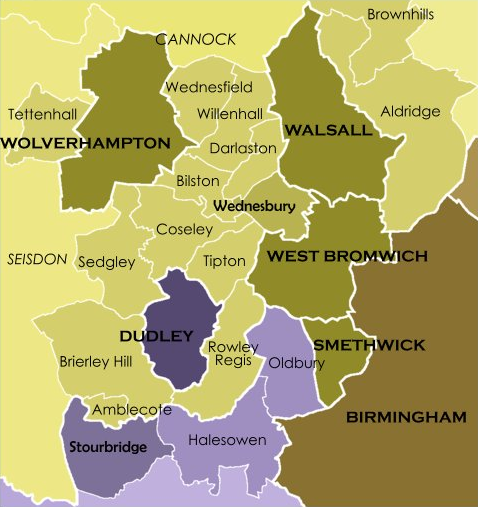
The local government structure within North Worcestershire and South Staffordshire prior to the West Midlands Order 1965 reorganisation

Prior to 1966, the area that would later become the metropolitan borough of Walsall was governed by five smaller local authorities:

- Aldridge Urban District
- Brownhills Urban District
- Darlaston Urban District
- Walsall County Borough
- Willenhall Urban District

The four urban districts were all within the administrative county of Staffordshire, in a two-tier structure with Staffordshire County Council providing county-level services. Walsall itself was a self-governing county borough, independent from the county council, but was still deemed to be part of Staffordshire for ceremonial purposes.

A review of local government in the West Midlands area was carried out under the Local Government Act 1958, culminating in the West Midlands Review Order 1965, which merged many of the districts in the area with effect from 1 April 1966. Darlaston and Willenhall were both absorbed into the county borough of Walsall, whilst the two urban districts of Brownhills and Aldridge merged to become Aldridge-Brownhills Urban District. At the same time, there were also more minor boundary adjustments with neighbouring areas around the edges of the new districts.

The new arrangements were relatively short-lived. Under the Local Government Act 1972, local government in the area was reviewed again, with Walsall County Borough and Aldridge-Brownhills Urban District merging to become the Metropolitan Borough of Walsall on 1 April 1974. On the same date the area became part of the new metropolitan county of West Midlands. For the next twelve years there was a two-tier structure in place, with West Midlands County Council providing higher county-level services. The county council was abolished in 1986.

There were adjustments to some of the boundaries between Walsall and its neighbours in 1994.

== Governance ==
=== Parliamentary constituencies ===
Since the 2024 general election, the residents of the Metropolitan Borough of Walsall have been represented in the UK Parliament by Members of Parliament (MPs) for four separate parliamentary constituencies. Two, Walsall and Bloxwich and Aldridge-Brownhills fall wholly within the borough and are represented by Valerie Vaz (Labour) and Wendy Morton (Conservative) respectively. Parts of the borough are within the constituencies of Wolverhampton North East and Wolverhampton South East, represented by Sureena Brackenridge and Pat McFadden (both Labour) respectively.

Prior to Brexit in 2020, the borough was part of the West Midlands constituency in the European Parliament. The West Midlands region elected seven MEPs.

=== Council ===
In 1974, Walsall Metropolitan Borough Council was created to administer the new metropolitan borough. Elections to the council take place in three out of every four years, with one-third of the seats being contested at each election. Between its formation in 1974 and the 2003 election, the council varied between control by the Labour Party, and where no one party had an overall majority. From 2003 to 2011 the Conservative Party then held a majority of councillors. At the 2011 election the Conservative Party lost five seats, while Labour gained eight, and afterwards no party held a majority. At the 2019 election, the Conservative Party regained control of the council.

== Demography ==
At the time of the United Kingdom Census 2001, according to the Office for National Statistics, the Metropolitan Borough of Walsall had a total resident population of 253,499, of which 123,189 (48.6%) were male and 130,310 (51.4%) were female, with 101,333 households. The Borough occupied 10,395 hectares (40.14 sq mi) at the time of the 2001 census.

Its population density was 22.79 people per hectare compared with an average of 28.41 across the West Midlands metropolitan county. The median age of the population was 37, compared with 36 within the West Midlands metropolitan county and 37 across England and Wales.

The majority of the population of the Metropolitan Borough of Walsall were born in England (91.77%); 1.42% were born elsewhere within the United Kingdom, 0.82% within the rest of the European Union, and 6.00% elsewhere in the world.

Data on religious beliefs across the borough in the 2001 census show that 72.1% declared themselves to be Christian, 10.0% said they held no religion, and 5.4% reported themselves as Muslim. Whereas in the 2011 Census 59% declared themselves to be Christian, 26% said they held no religion or did not state their religion, and 8.2% reported themselves as Muslim.

Within the Metropolitan Borough, 42.84% of households owned a single car or van, with 31.05% owning none. The average car ownership per household was 1.01, compared with 0.96 across the West Midlands metropolitan county.

Ethnic Group	1981 estimations		1991 census		2021 census	
Ethnic Group	Number	%	Number	%	Number	%
White: Total	251,718	92.8%	237,858	90.3%	202,724	71.4%
White: British	–	–	–	–	191,529	67.4%
White: Irish	–	–	–	–	1,070	0.4%
White: Gypsy or Irish Traveller	–	–	–	–	576	0.2%
White: Roma	–	–	–	–		
White: Other	–	–	–	–	9,549	3.4%
Asian or Asian British: Total	15,950	5.9%	21,224		53,199	18.6%
Asian or Asian British: Indian	9,920		12,525		22,726	2.0%
Asian or Asian British: Pakistani	4,531		6,299		49,739	4.9%
Asian or Asian British: Bangladeshi	841		1,500		86,378	7.9%
Asian or Asian British: Chinese	302		428		11,891	2.3%
Asian or Asian British: Other Asian	356		472		3,465	1.2%
Black or Black British: Total	2,877	1.1%	3,475		13,024	4.6%
Black or Black British: African	135		139		6,439	2.3%
Black or Black British: Caribbean	2,062		2,484		4,889	1.7%
Black or Black British: Other Black	680		852		1,696	0.6%
Mixed or British Mixed: Total	–	–	–	–	9,317	3.2%
Mixed: White and Black Caribbean	–	–	–	–	4,834	1.7%
Mixed: White and Black African	–	–	–	–	620	0.2%
Mixed: White and Asian	–	–	–	–	2,386	0.8%
Mixed: Other Mixed	–	–	–	–	1,477	0.5%
Other: Total	670	0.2%	843		5,862	2.1%
Other: Arab	–	–	–	–	509	0.2%
Other: Any other ethnic group	670		843		5,353	1.9%
Non-White: Total	19,496	7.2%	25,542		81,402	28.5%
Total	271,214	100%	263,400	100%	284,126	100%

=== Population change ===
The table below details the population change in the area since 1801. Although the Metropolitan Borough of Walsall has existed as a metropolitan borough only since 1974, figures have been generated by combining data from the towns, villages, and civil parishes that would later be constituent parts of the borough.

Historical population of area now covered by the Metropolitan Borough of Walsall
Year	1801	1811	1821	1831	1841	1851	1861	1871	1881	1891	1901
Population	17,615	20,329	22,309	27,640	37,670	46,597	67,260	87,923	108,586	125,317	140,919
Year	1911	1921	1931	1941	1951	1961	1971	1981	1991	2001	2011
Population	158,465	169,406	181,114	194,983	209,918	239,729	273,794	265,908	263,399	253,502	269,300
Source: Vision of Britain

== Economy ==
Walsall MBC Compared
2001 UK Census	Walsall MBC	West Midlands county	England
Population (16–74)	180,623	1,807,918	35,532,091
Full-time employment	39.1%	38.6%	40.8%
Part-time employment	11.9%	11.1%	11.8%
Self-employed	6.0%	5.7%	8.3%
Unemployed	4.4%	4.6%	3.3%
Retired	14.8%	13.5%	13.5%
Source: Office for National Statistics

At the time of the 2001 census, there were 105,590 people (41.7%) in employment who were resident within Walsall Metropolitan Borough. Of these, 18.60% worked within the wholesale and retail trade, including repair of motor vehicles; 26.44% worked within manufacturing industry; and 9.85% worked within the health and social work sector.

At the 2001 UK census, Walsall Metropolitan Borough had 180,623 residents aged 16 to 74. 2.3% of these people were students with jobs, 6.0% looking after home or family, 6.8% permanently sick or disabled and 2.4% economically inactive for other reasons. These figures are roughly in line with the averages for England, though Metropolitan Borough of Walsall has a higher rate of people who are permanently sick and disabled, where the national average is 5.3%.

The Metropolitan Borough of Walsall is split between several travel to work areas (TTWA). The central and northern areas of the borough (including the towns of Walsall, Bloxwich and Brownhills) are within the Walsall and Cannock TTWA, whilst the majority of the area west of the M6 motorway (including the towns of Willenhall and Darlaston) is within the Wolverhampton TTWA. The southeast of the Metropolitan Borough (including Streetly) is within the Birmingham TTWA. The entire borough is within the Birmingham Larger Urban Zone.

Average house prices in the Metropolitan Borough of Walsall were fourth out of the metropolitan boroughs in the West Midlands county, with the average house price within the borough being £131,131 during the period April–June 2009, compared with the average across the Metropolitan County of £128,142. Following transfer from the council in 2003, social housing in the area is primarily managed by WATMOS (consisting of eight Tenant management organisations), and the Walsall Housing Group.

== Transport ==
The A34 trunk road runs directly through the middle of Walsall .

An elevated section of the M6 Motorway built in 1968 half circles around Walsall to the west of the town. The M6 and M5 join at junction 8.

The A454 runs through Walsall on its way to Sutton Coldfield from Bridgnorth.

The Chase Line is a railway line which runs from Birmingham International via Birmingham New Street and Walsall to Rugeley Trent Valley. The following stations on the line are within the Borough:

- Bescot Stadium
- Walsall
- Bloxwich
- Bloxwich North

== Localities ==
See List of areas in the Metropolitan Borough of Walsall.

== Education ==
45% of pupils in the Borough of Walsall achieved five GCSEs with grades of A*-C, below the national average of 56%.

The borough's education format is a traditional 5–7 infant, 7–11 junior and 11-16/18 secondary school system, with some infant and junior schools being combined single site primary schools, while others have infant and junior schools on separate sites. The towns of Walsall, Bloxwich, Darlaston and Willenhall have always used these age ranges, but the Aldridge, Brownhills and Streetly areas (which became part of the Metropolitan Borough of Walsall in 1974) adopted 5–9 first, 9–13 middle and 13-16/18 secondary schools in September 1972. However, this system was discontinued and replaced with the traditional age ranges in September 1986 to fit in with the other schools in the Walsall borough.

== Freedom of the Borough ==
The following people and military units have received the Freedom of the Borough of Walsall.

=== Individuals ===
- Professor Rashid Gatrad: 29 January 2014.
- Neville John "Noddy" Holder: 24 June 2014.
- Ian Shires: 17 November 2021.

=== Military units ===
- The South Staffordshire Regiment: 1946.
- The Staffordshire Regiment: 1959.
- The Mercian Regiment: 2007.
