= 2004 Walsall Metropolitan Borough Council election =

2004 UK local government election

Map of the results of the 2004 Walsall council election. Conservatives in blue, Labour in red, Liberal Democrats in yellow and independent in grey.

The 2004 Walsall Metropolitan Borough Council election took place on 10 June 2004 to elect members of Walsall Metropolitan Borough Council in the West Midlands, England. The whole council was up for election with boundary changes since the last election in 2003. The Conservative Party gained overall control of the council from no overall control.

== Background ==
Before the election the council was run by a coalition between the Conservative and Liberal Democrat parties, with Labour holding 27 seats, the Conservatives 24, Liberal Democrats 7 and UK Independence Party 2. 60 seats were contested with the candidates including 7 from the British National Party.

== Election result ==
The results saw the Conservatives win a majority on the council with 35 of the 60 seats. Labour were reduced to 16 seats, with the chairs of the West Midlands Police Authority and West Midlands Passenger Transport Executive, Mohammed Nazir and Richard Worrell, among those to lose at the election. Meanwhile, the Liberal Democrats won 6 seats and there was 1 independent, while the 2 UK Independence Party councillors both lost their seats.

After results were declared, a box with 200 ballot papers in it was discovered underneath a table. These were then counted, but the returning officer did not include them in the declarations, as they said it would not have affected the results.

Walsall local election result 2004
Party	Seats	Gains	Losses	Net gain/loss	Seats %	Votes %	Votes	+/−
Conservative	35			+11	58.3	41.2	71,791	-0.8%
Labour	18			-9	30.0	30.8	53,684	-4.4%
Liberal Democrats	6			-1	10.0	13.3	23,212	+2.4%
Independent	1			+1	1.7	4.5	7,912	-0.4%
UKIP	0			-2	0	5.5	9,662	+3.1%
BNP	0			0	0	2.8	4,878	+2.8%
Democratic Socialist Alliance – People Before Profit	0			0	0	1.8	3,130	-2.8%

== Ward results ==
Aldridge Central and South (3)
Party	Candidate	Votes	%	±%
Conservative	Thomas Ansell	2,238		
Conservative	John Rochelle	2,207		
Conservative	John O'Hare	2,054		
UKIP	Anthony Lenton	1,087		
BNP	Julie Locke	751		
Liberal Democrats	Sandra Johnson	718		
Labour	Ian Geary	714		
Labour	Christopher Daniel	691		
Liberal Democrats	Royston Sheward	680		
Liberal Democrats	Natalie Greveson	584		
Labour	Christopher Wellings	536		
Turnout		12,260	43.8	

Aldridge North and Walsall Wood (3)
Party	Candidate	Votes	%	±%
Conservative	Keith Sears	1,489		
Conservative	Roger Collins	1,488		
Conservative	Anthony Harris	1,300		
UKIP	Graham Eardley	1,037		
Labour	Angus McGhee	656		
Labour	Gary Hills	655		
Labour	Veronica Walker	589		
Liberal Democrats	Mark Greveson	448		
Liberal Democrats	Shirley Balgobin	404		
Liberal Democrats	Stanley Evans	376		
Turnout		8,442	35.4	

Bentley and Darlaston North (3)
Party	Candidate	Votes	%	±%
Labour	Stanley Madeley	1,322		
Labour	Keith Chambers	1,063		
Labour	Ayshea Johnson	937		
Conservative	Mohammed Chaudray	795		
Conservative	Doris Silvester	659		
BNP	Kevin Smith	632		
UKIP	Steven Johnson	630		
Conservative	Daniel Lloyd	599		
Liberal Democrats	Christopher Pearce	377		
Democratic Socialist Alliance – People Before Profit	Terence Durrant	197		
Turnout		7,211	32.0	

Birchills-Leamore (3)
Party	Candidate	Votes	%	±%
Labour	Joan Barton	1,023		
Labour	Timothy Oliver	902		
Labour	Carol Rose	894		
Conservative	Mazhar Iqbal	699		
Conservative	Hilda Derry	691		
Conservative	Nagman Aftab	650		
Liberal Democrats	Anne Willoughby	437		
Democratic Socialist Alliance – People Before Profit	Alan Davies	369		
Turnout		5,665	26.0	

Blakenall (3)
Party	Candidate	Votes	%	±%
Labour	Ian Robertson	910		
Labour	Robert Robinson	867		
Labour	Patricia Young	847		
Democratic Socialist Alliance – People Before Profit	Peter Smith	736		
Independent	Ray Cooper	471		
Conservative	Peter Roberts	408		
Conservative	Pervaiz Khan	295		
Conservative	Mehnawaz Khan	251		
Liberal Democrats	Paul Russell	242		
Independent	Peter Aston	227		
Independent	Julie Corser	211		
Turnout		5,465	26.7	

Bloxwich East (3)
Party	Candidate	Votes	%	±%
Conservative	William Tweddle	1,159		
Conservative	Lesley Beeley	1,033		
Labour	Kathleen Phillips	1,001		
Conservative	Alan Venables	933		
Labour	Jonathan Phillips	862		
Labour	Shaun Fitzpatrick	837		
BNP	Steven Price	514		
Independent	Andrew Ball	474		
Independent	Janet Pitt	292		
Independent	Karen Carter	262		
Democratic Socialist Alliance – People Before Profit	Stephanie Peart	155		
Turnout		7,522	33.5	

Bloxwich West (3)
Party	Candidate	Votes	%	±%
Conservative	Melvin Pitt	1,172		
Conservative	Desmond Pitt	1,143		
Conservative	Louise Harrison	1,127		
Labour	Frederick Westley	1,079		
Labour	Kenneth Worley	1,062		
Labour	Diane Coughlan	913		
BNP	Neil Davies	653		
Liberal Democrats	James Rudge	275		
Democratic Socialist Alliance – People Before Profit	David Church	255		
Independent	Amanda Pitt	247		
Independent	Kerrie Pitt	237		
Independent	John Pitt	187		
Turnout		8,350	33.1	

Brownhills (3)
Party	Candidate	Votes	%	±%
Conservative	Alan Paul	1,282		
Labour	Barbara Cassidy	1,072		
Conservative	David Turner	970		
Conservative	Robert Culbert	952		
Labour	Richard Worrall	935		
Labour	Stephen Docherty	890		
BNP	William Vaughan	792		
UKIP	Elizabeth Hazell	645		
Liberal Democrats	Josephine Baddeley	495		
Turnout		8,033	34.6	

Darlaston South (3)
Party	Candidate	Votes	%	±%
Labour	Tony Rowley	1,103		
Labour	Maria-Rosaria Burley	1,009		
Independent	Paul Bott	1,007		
Labour	Graham Wilkes	1,004		
Conservative	Michelle Martin	546		
Conservative	James Letts	536		
Conservative	Lorna Rattigan	463		
Democratic Socialist Alliance – People Before Profit	Alan Johnston	459		
Liberal Democrats	Jody Pearce	392		
Turnout		6,519	28.0	

Paddock (3)
Party	Candidate	Votes	%	±%
Conservative	Rose Martin	2,197		
Conservative	Barry Sanders	1,985		
Conservative	Zahid Ali	1,857		
Labour	Baldev Mavi	1,228		
Labour	Khizar Hussain	1,211		
Labour	Martin Evans	1,104		
UKIP	Derek Bennett	989		
Liberal Democrats	Daniel Barker	832		
Liberal Democrats	Martin Barker	790		
Liberal Democrats	Murli Sinha	616		
Turnout		12,809	52.0	

Palfrey (3)
Party	Candidate	Votes	%	±%
Conservative	Joan Beilby	2,043		
Conservative	Mohammad Yasin	1,991		
Conservative	Mohammad Munir	1,821		
Labour	Mohammad Nazir	1,773		
Labour	Nasar Ali	1,532		
Labour	Mark Pulford	1,403		
Liberal Democrats	Karen Pandaal	550		
Independent	Mohammed Mulla	463		
Turnout		11,576	45.8	

Pelsall (3)
Party	Candidate	Votes	%	±%
Conservative	Garry Perry	2,330		
Conservative	Marco Longhi	1,999		
Conservative	Clive Ault	1,596		
Liberal Democrats	Simeon Mayou	1,073		
Liberal Democrats	Linda Dickins	723		
BNP	Dominic Bugler	692		
Liberal Democrats	Michael Jones	628		
Labour	Neil Perrett	502		
Labour	Walter Burley	484		
Labour	Ronald Rock	433		
Democratic Socialist Alliance – People Before Profit	Derek Roddy	176		
Turnout		10,636	43.4	

Pheasey Park Farm (3)
Party	Candidate	Votes	%	±%
Conservative	Adrian Andrew	1,514		
Conservative	Michael Bird	1,259		
Conservative	Christopher Towe	1,232		
Independent	Darren Porter	1,124		
Labour	Spedding McMullen	809		
Labour	Brenda Etchells	795		
Labour	Paulette Green	773		
Independent	Edmund Newman	695		
Independent	Gloria Newman	592		
Independent	Peter Ruston	323		
Liberal Democrats	Christine Cockayne	306		
Turnout		9,422	42.7	

Pleck (3)
Party	Candidate	Votes	%	±%
Labour	Dennis Anson	1,518		
Conservative	Mohammed Aslam	1,338		
Labour	Harbans Sarohi	1,308		
Labour	Ann Wilson	1,235		
Conservative	Mark Dabbs	1,183		
Conservative	Mohammed Arshad	1,101		
Independent	Norman Matthews	800		
Democratic Socialist Alliance – People Before Profit	Brian Powell	371		
Turnout		8,854	39.2	

Rushall-Shelfield (3)
Party	Candidate	Votes	%	±%
Conservative	Catherine Micklewright	1,217		
Conservative	Albert Griffiths	1,191		
Conservative	Rachel Walker	979		
Labour	Thomas Perrett	891		
BNP	Williams Locke	844		
UKIP	Jenny Mayo	798		
Labour	Lorraine Smith	688		
Labour	Robert Thomas	654		
Liberal Democrats	Ian Dickins	519		
Democratic Socialist Alliance – People Before Profit	Louise Bradburn	275		
Turnout		8,056	35.8	

Short Heath (3)
Party	Candidate	Votes	%	±%
Liberal Democrats	Doreen Shires	1,458		
Liberal Democrats	Eileen Pitt	1,439		
Liberal Democrats	John Cook	1,313		
Conservative	Bryan Bond	563		
Conservative	Terence Sharp	540		
Conservative	Wendy Sharp	525		
Labour	Richard Walker	497		
Labour	Douglas James	452		
Labour	Sumit Grover	433		
Turnout		7,220	30.7	

St. Matthews (3)
Party	Candidate	Votes	%	±%
Conservative	Mohammed Arif	1,618		
Conservative	Barbara McCracken	1,586		
Conservative	Haqnawaz Khan	1,505		
Labour	Mohammed Yaqoob	1,210		
Labour	Moses Whyte	1,051		
UKIP	Jennifer Beale	1,027		
Labour	Gareth Walker	1,023		
UKIP	Mohammed Yaqub	823		
UKIP	Andrew Scullion	817		
Liberal Democrats	Louise Shires	658		
Turnout		11,318	46.6	

Streetly (3)
Party	Candidate	Votes	%	±%
Conservative	Brian Douglas-Maul	2,472		
Conservative	Arthur Clarke	1,984		
Conservative	Edmund Hughes	1,886		
UKIP	Steven Grey	1,291		
Labour	Thomas Charlton	753		
Labour	Steven King	670		
Liberal Democrats	Josephine Levine	664		
Labour	Kathryn Ibbotson	522		
Turnout		10,242	40.7	

Willenhall North (3)
Party	Candidate	Votes	%	±%
Liberal Democrats	Ian Shires	1,507		
Liberal Democrats	Arthur Bentley	1,382		
Liberal Democrats	Valerie Woodruff	1,209		
UKIP	Alan Sheath	518		
Labour	Robert Matthews	428		
Conservative	Joy Kemp	417		
Labour	Stephen Rose	407		
Labour	Ian Pearson	398		
Conservative	Margaret Salt	361		
Conservative	Iris Turner	347		
Independent	Tim Woodley	300		
Democratic Socialist Alliance – People Before Profit	Alan Paddock	137		
Turnout		7,411	29.4	

Willenhall South (3)
Party	Candidate	Votes	%	±%
Labour	Sean Coughlan	1,133		
Labour	Harold Withnall	1,022		
Labour	Angela Underhill	971		
Liberal Democrats	Wendy Evans	737		
Conservative	Chad Pitt	727		
Liberal Democrats	Peter Hughes	702		
Liberal Democrats	Robert Pearce	680		
Conservative	Justin Douglas-Maul	677		
Conservative	Parmjit Singh	611		
Turnout		7,260	28.0	
