= 1999 Walsall Metropolitan Borough Council election =

1999 UK local government election

The 1999 Walsall Metropolitan Borough Council election took place on 6 May 1999 to elect members of Walsall Metropolitan Borough Council in the West Midlands, England. One third of the council was up for election and the Labour party gained overall control of the council from no overall control.

After the election, the composition of the council was

- Labour 31
- Conservative 21
- Liberal Democrat 6
- Independent 2

== Election result ==
Walsall local election result 1999
| Party | Seats | Gains | Losses | Net gain/loss | Seats % | Votes % | Votes | +/− |
|---|---|---|---|---|---|---|---|---|
| Labour | 11 | | | +2 | 52.4 | | | |
| Conservative | 8 | | | +5 | 38.1 | | | |
| Liberal Democrats | 2 | | | +1 | 9.5 | | | |
| Others | 0 | | | -8 | 0 | | | |
