= 2011 Walsall Metropolitan Borough Council election =

2011 UK local government election

Map of the results of the 2011 Walsall council election. Labour in red, Conservatives in blue and Liberal Democrats in yellow.

The 2011 Walsall Metropolitan Borough Council election took place on 5 May 2011 to elect members of Walsall Metropolitan Borough Council in the West Midlands, England. One third of the council was up for election and the Conservative Party lost overall control of the council to no overall control.

After the election, the composition of the council was:

- Conservative 28
- Labour 26
- Liberal Democrats 5
- Independent 1

== Background ==
The council leader Mike Bird was one of the Conservatives who were defending seats at the election, along with a member of his cabinet Barbara McCracken.

== Election result ==
The results saw the Conservatives lose their majority on the council after Labour gained 8 seats, including 5 from the Conservatives. This meant the Conservatives had 28 councillors compared to 26 for Labour, leaving the Liberal Democrats, down one on five seats, holding the balance.

Following the election the Conservatives continued to run the council as a minority administration.

Walsall local election result 2011
Party	Seats	Gains	Losses	Net gain/loss	Seats %	Votes %	Votes	+/−
Labour	12	8	0	+8	57.1	40.6	31,104	+9.3%
Conservative	8	0	5	−5	38.1	40.0	30,592	+0.5%
Liberal Democrats	1	0	1	−1	4.8	7.1	5,430	−9.0%
UKIP	0	0	0	0	0	5.8	4,467	+0.3%
Independent	0	0	1	−1	0	3.1	2,372	−0.3%
Democratic Labour	0	0	1	−1	0	2.3	1,785	+0.9%
BNP	0	0	0	0	0	0.4	307	−0.7%
Green	0	0	0	0	0	0.3	255	−1.1%
English Democrat	0	0	0	0	0	0.3	210	+0.3%

== Ward results ==
Aldridge Central and South (2)
Party	Candidate	Votes	%	±%
Conservative	John Rochelle	2,719		
Conservative	John Murray	2,553		
Labour	Angus McGhee	976		
Labour	Michael Johnson	967		
Liberal Democrats	Roy Sheward	632		
UKIP	Bruce Bennett	552		
UKIP	Malcolm Ford	378		
Turnout		8,777	44.0	−24.5
Conservative hold		Swing		
Conservative hold		Swing		

Aldridge North and Walsall Wood
Party	Candidate	Votes	%	±%
Conservative	Mike Flower	2,167	56.5	+2.8
Labour	Bob Grainger	1,094	28.5	+6.5
BNP	Terence Majorwicz	307	8.0	+8.0
Liberal Democrats	Mark Greveson	267	7.0	−13.4
Majority		1,073	28.0	−3.7
Turnout		3,835	38.3	−26.3
Conservative hold		Swing		

Bentley and Darlaston North
Party	Candidate	Votes	%	±%
Labour	Keith Chambers	1,922	65.0	+22.2
Conservative	Jeet Sohal	572	19.4	−10.6
UKIP	Annette Ford	418	14.1	+2.2
Democratic Labour	Alan Paddock	43	1.5	+0.6
Majority		1,350	45.7	+32.9
Turnout		2,955	32.1	−23.5
Labour hold		Swing		

Birchills-Leamore
Party	Candidate	Votes	%	±%
Labour	Tim Oliver	1,574	55.0	+17.9
Conservative	Kamran Aftab	961	33.6	+0.1
Liberal Democrats	Roy Robinson	167	5.8	−6.9
Democratic Labour	Alan Davies	158	5.5	+2.7
Majority		613	21.4	+17.8
Turnout		2,860	30.3	−20.4
Labour hold		Swing		

Blakenall
Party	Candidate	Votes	%	±%
Labour	Ann Young	1,256	46.0	+5.1
Democratic Labour	Peter Smith	928	34.0	+14.4
Conservative	Muhammed Afzal	453	16.6	−10.1
Liberal Democrats	Robert Pearce	95	3.5	−9.3
Majority		328	12.0	−2.2
Turnout		2,732	32.4	−13.9
Labour gain from Democratic Labour		Swing		

Bloxwich East
Party	Candidate	Votes	%	±%
Labour	Shaun Fitzpatrick	1,205	42.8	+1.6
Conservative	Les Beeley	1,191	42.3	+6.5
UKIP	Alan Sheath	229	8.1	−2.1
Democratic Labour	Stephen Baggott	107	3.8	+0.0
Liberal Democrats	Chris Cockayne	81	2.9	−6.2
Majority		14	0.5	−4.9
Turnout		2,813	33.0	−21.2
Labour gain from Conservative		Swing		

Bloxwich West
Party	Candidate	Votes	%	±%
Labour	Sue Fletcher-Hall	1,438	45.2	+10.1
Conservative	Des Pitt	1,360	42.8	+2.1
Democratic Labour	Michael Ross	234	7.4	+7.4
Liberal Democrats	Jeanette Pearce	146	4.6	−5.2
Majority		78	2.4	
Turnout		3,178	33.3	−26.1
Labour gain from Conservative		Swing		

Brownhills
Party	Candidate	Votes	%	±%
Labour	Barbara Cassidy	1,758	52.8	+16.1
Conservative	Vivienne Aston	1,279	38.4	−2.9
Liberal Democrats	Ian Ryan	219	6.6	−10.5
Democratic Labour	Andrew Bradburn	72	2.2	+0.3
Majority		479	14.4	
Turnout		3,328	34.0	−24.7
Labour hold		Swing		

Darlaston South
Party	Candidate	Votes	%	±%
Labour	Douglas James	1,205	41.5	+7.1
Independent	Chris Bott	1,112	38.3	+2.3
Conservative	Michelle Martin	334	11.5	−8.3
Independent	Ashley Lovell	138	4.8	+4.8
Green	Tim Martin	114	3.9	+3.9
Majority		93	3.2	
Turnout		2,903	31.2	−22.3
Labour gain from Independent		Swing		

Paddock
Party	Candidate	Votes	%	±%
Conservative	Barbara McCracken	2,124	41.8	−1.1
Labour	Nasar Ali	1,795	35.3	+7.5
Independent	Barry Sanders	570	11.2	+2.0
UKIP	Derek Bennett	471	9.3	−0.1
Liberal Democrats	Abdul Malik	119	2.3	−8.4
Majority		329	6.5	−8.5
Turnout		5,079	52.8	−18.6
Conservative hold		Swing		

Palfrey
Party	Candidate	Votes	%	±%
Labour	Allah Ditta	3,008	60.2	+10.0
Conservative	Mohammad Yasin	1,755	35.1	+4.2
Liberal Democrats	Sadat Hussain	235	4.7	−14.2
Majority		1,253	25.1	+5.8
Turnout		4,998	48.4	−15.7
Labour gain from Conservative		Swing		

Pelsall
Party	Candidate	Votes	%	±%
Conservative	Marco Longhi	2,085	57.3	+11.4
Labour	Stephen Wade	979	26.9	+8.4
UKIP	Dorothy Sheath	315	8.7	+2.6
Liberal Democrats	Shirley Balgobin	185	5.1	+5.1
Democratic Labour	Derek Roddy	77	2.1	+0.9
Majority		1,106	30.4	+4.1
Turnout		3,641	41.0	−25.9
Conservative hold		Swing		

Pheasey Park Farm
Party	Candidate	Votes	%	±%
Conservative	Mike Bird	1,782	48.3	−1.8
Labour	Jack Kelly	1,161	31.5	+6.2
UKIP	Steven Grey	429	11.6	−1.6
English Democrat	Christopher Newey	210	5.7	+5.7
Liberal Democrats	Anne Willoughby	104	2.8	−8.6
Majority		621	16.8	−7.9
Turnout		3,686	42.4	−26.2
Conservative hold		Swing		

Pleck
Party	Candidate	Votes	%	±%
Labour	Khazar Hussain	2,449	58.5	+17.2
Conservative	Mushtaq Ahmed	767	18.3	−13.3
Independent	Mark Dabbs	475	11.3	+5.2
Liberal Democrats	Mohammed Yaqub	331	7.9	−6.4
Democratic Labour	Brian Powell	166	4.0	+4.0
Majority		1,682	40.2	+30.5
Turnout		4,188	43.8	−16.3
Labour gain from Conservative		Swing		

Rushall-Shelfield
Party	Candidate	Votes	%	±%
Conservative	Lorna Rattigan	1,337	42.2	−1.6
Labour	Richard Worrall	1,309	41.3	+14.3
UKIP	Timothy Melville	273	8.6	+0.4
Liberal Democrats	Roy Smitb	159	5.0	−12.8
Green	Mike Walters	92	2.9	−0.3
Majority		28	0.9	−15.9
Turnout		3,170	35.5	−24.8
Conservative hold		Swing		

Short Heath
Party	Candidate	Votes	%	±%
Liberal Democrats	Daniel Barker	924	31.3	−6.9
Labour	Doug Cleaver	813	27.5	+5.2
Conservative	Theresa Smith	805	27.2	−1.5
UKIP	Darren Hazell	287	9.7	−1.0
Independent	Malcolm Moore	77	2.6	+2.6
Green	Leandra Gebrakedan	49	1.7	+1.7
Majority		111	3.8	−5.7
Turnout		2,955	32.9	−26.4
Liberal Democrats hold		Swing		

St. Matthews
Party	Candidate	Votes	%	±%
Labour	Eileen Russell	1,984	47.2	+11.4
Conservative	Gerry McCracken	1,650	39.2	−2.9
Liberal Democrats	Khosru Miah	287	6.8	−7.4
UKIP	Rita Oakley	284	6.8	+6.8
Majority		334	8.0	
Turnout		4,205	42.7	−20.4
Labour gain from Conservative		Swing		

Streetly
Party	Candidate	Votes	%	±%
Conservative	Gary Clarke	2,897	60.6	+0.4
Labour	Steven King	1,200	25.1	+7.3
UKIP	Paul Valdmanis	391	8.2	+1.3
Liberal Democrats	John Garfitt	294	6.1	−7.7
Majority		1,697	35.5	−6.9
Turnout		4,782	44.3	−26.9
Conservative hold		Swing		

Willenhall North
Party	Candidate	Votes	%	±%
Labour	Gareth Illmann-Walker	1,012	30.9	+8.9
Liberal Democrats	Peter Hughes	943	28.8	−4.1
Conservative	Abi Pitt	875	26.8	−2.0
UKIP	Liz Hazell	440	13.5	+7.1
Majority		69	2.1	
Turnout		3,270	34.6	−27.1
Labour gain from Liberal Democrats		Swing		

Willenhall South
Party	Candidate	Votes	%	±%
Labour	Carl Creaney	1,999	63.1	+18.0
Conservative	Clive Rudd	926	29.2	−0.1
Liberal Democrats	Uppal Singh	242	7.6	−15.3
Majority		1,073	33.9	+18.1
Turnout		3,167	29.7	−24.6
Labour hold		Swing		
