= Walsall Council =

Local government body in England

Type
- Type: Metropolitan borough council

Leadership
- Mayor: Alan Fleming, Reform UK since 18 May 2026
- Leader: Elaine Williams, Reform UK since 21 May 2026
- Chief Executive: Emma Bennett since October 2023

Structure
- Seats: 60 councillors
- Graph of the party split among 60 seats.
- Political groups: Administration (37) Reform (37) Other parties (23) Conservative (10) Labour (1) Independent (12)
- Length of term: 4 years

Elections
- Voting system: First past the post
- Last election: 7 May 2026
- Next election: 6 May 2027

Meeting place
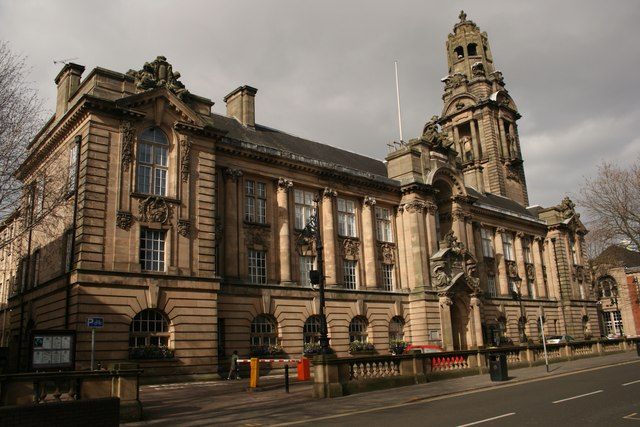
- Council House, Lichfield Street, Walsall, WS1 1TW

Website
- walsall.gov.uk

Walsall Council, formally Walsall Metropolitan Borough Council, is the local authority for the Metropolitan Borough of Walsall in the West Midlands, England. The town of Walsall had been a borough from medieval times, which was reformed on numerous occasions. Since 1974 the council has been a metropolitan borough council. It provides the majority of local government services in the borough. The council has been a member of the West Midlands Combined Authority since 2016.

The council has been under Reform UK majority control since the May 2026 election. The council meets at Walsall Council House and has its main offices at the adjoining Civic Centre.

== History ==
The town of Walsall was an ancient borough. It also had a mayor from at least 1377. The town's claim to be a borough was not supported by a charter, leading to disputes with the lord of the manor. A formal charter was eventually issued in 1627. The borough was reformed to become a municipal borough in 1836 under the Municipal Corporations Act 1835, which standardised how most boroughs operated across the country. It was then governed by a body formally called the 'mayor, aldermen and burgesses of the borough of Walsall', generally known as the corporation, town council or borough council.

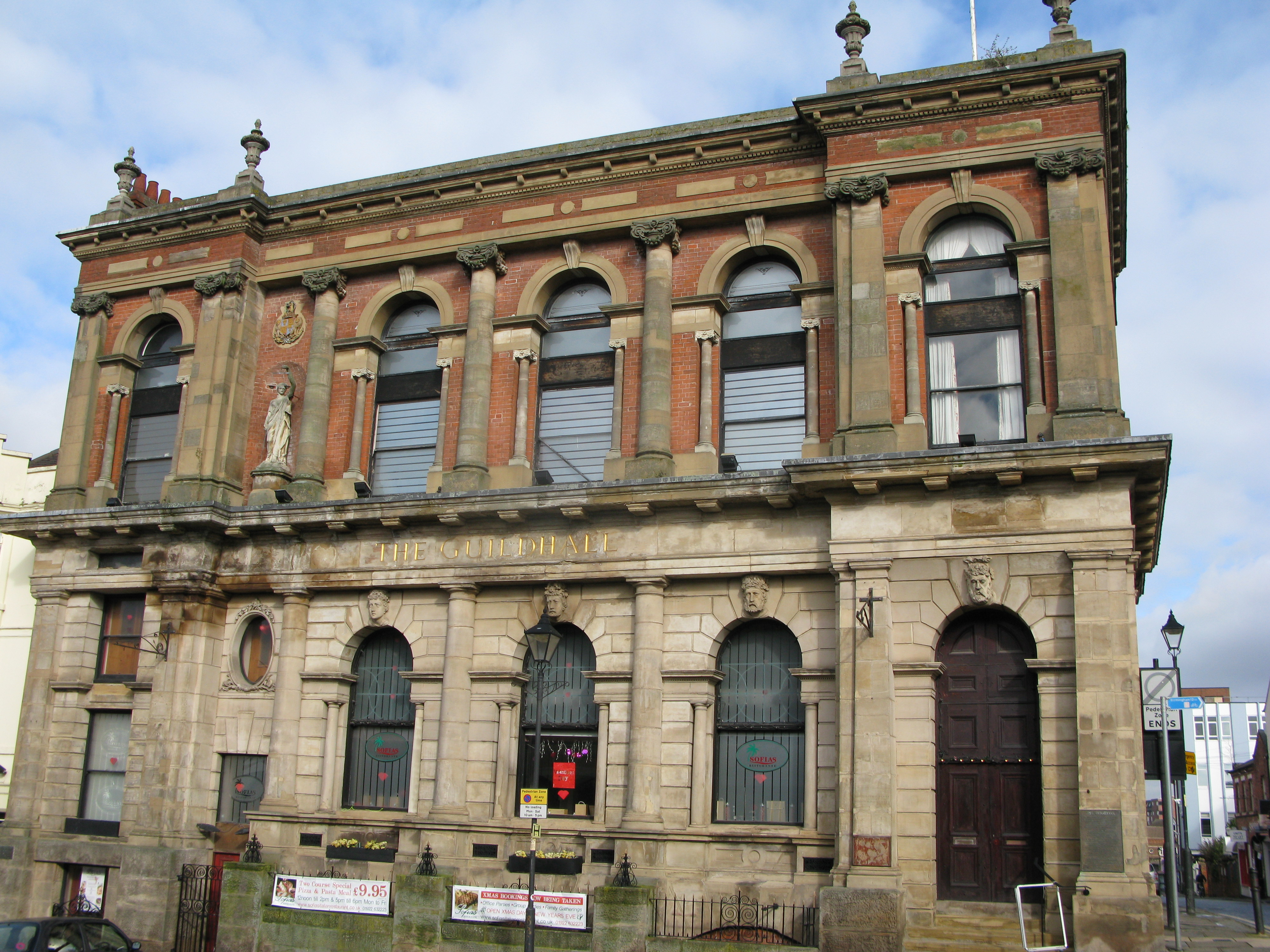
Walsall Guildhall: Seat of local government in Walsall until 1905

When elected county councils were established in 1889, Walsall was considered large enough to provide its own county-level services, and so it became a county borough, independent from the new Staffordshire County Council, whilst remaining part of the geographical county of Staffordshire. The borough was enlarged in 1966 to take in Darlaston and Willenhall.

The modern metropolitan borough and its council were established in 1974 under the Local Government Act 1972, as one of seven boroughs in the new metropolitan county of the West Midlands. The new borough covered the combined area of the old county borough of Walsall plus the neighbouring Aldridge-Brownhills Urban District. The metropolitan district was awarded borough status from its creation, allowing the chair of the council to take the title of mayor, continuing Walsall's series of mayors dating back to the fourteenth century. The council styles itself Walsall Council rather than its full formal name of Walsall Metropolitan Borough Council.

From 1974 until 1986 the council was a lower-tier authority, with upper-tier functions provided by the West Midlands County Council. The county council was abolished in 1986 and its functions passed to the county's seven borough councils, including Walsall, with some services provided through joint committees.

Since 2016 the council has been a member of the West Midlands Combined Authority, which has been led by the directly elected Mayor of the West Midlands since 2017. The combined authority provides strategic leadership and co-ordination for certain functions across the county, but Walsall Council continues to be responsible for most local government functions.

== Governance ==
Walsall Council provides metropolitan borough services. Some strategic functions in the area are provided by the West Midlands Combined Authority; the council appoints two of its councillors to sit on the board of the combined authority as Walsall's representatives. There are no civil parishes in the borough.

=== Political control ===
Reform UK have held majority control after winning 40 of the 60 seats in the 2026 Local Elections.

Political control of the council since 1974 has been as follows:

Party in control	Years
Labour	1974–1976
No overall control	1976–1980
Labour	1980–1982
No overall control	1982–1988
Labour	1988–1992
No overall control	1992–1995
Labour	1995–1996
No overall control	1996–1999
Labour	1999–2000
No overall control	2000–2004
Conservative	2004–2011
No overall control	2011–2019
Conservative	2019-2026
No overall control	2026–2026
Reform	2026-present

=== Leadership ===
The role of mayor is largely ceremonial in Walsall. Political leadership is provided by the leader of the council. The leaders since 1980 have been:

Councillor	Party	From	To
Brian Powell	Labour	May 1980	May 1982
Bert Smith (Note: At the council's annual meeting in May 1982 it was decided not to appoint a leader. Despite the lack of a formal appointment, the media routinely referred to Conservative leader Bert Smith as being the leader of the council.)	Conservative	1982	May 1986
Eric Alison	Labour	May 1986	17 Jun 1988
Geoff Edge	Labour	Jul 1988	Apr 1990
Jim Gavin	Labour	Apr 1990	May 1992
Mike Bird	Conservative	May 1992	May 1995
Dave Church	Labour	May 1995	12 Dec 1995
Dave Church	Independent	12 Dec 1995	22 Jan 1996
Ray Farrell	Labour	22 Jan 1996	29 Nov 1998
Bill Madeley	Labour	Jan 1999	May 1999
Harold Withnall	Labour	May 1999	May 2000
Mike Bird	Conservative	May 2000	Oct 2001
Tom Ansell	Conservative	Oct 2001	May 2007
John O'Hare	Conservative	23 May 2007	May 2009
Mike Bird	Conservative	20 May 2009	11 Aug 2014
Sean Coughlan	Labour	11 Aug 2014	3 Jun 2015
Mike Bird	Conservative	3 Jun 2015	25 May 2016
Sean Coughlan	Labour	25 May 2016	23 May 2018
Mike Bird	Conservative	23 May 2018	8 May 2024
Mike Bird	Independent	8 May 2024	3 Jun 2024
Garry Perry	Conservative	3 Jun 2024	21 May 2025
Mike Bird	Conservative	10 Jun 2025	May 2026
Elaine Williams	Reform	21 May 2026	

=== Composition ===
Following the 2026 election and subsequent changes of allegiance up to July 2026, the composition of the council was:

Party	Seats
Reform	38
Conservative	10
Labour	1
Independent	11
Total	60

Eight of the independents sit together as the "Walsall Community Independents" group. The next election is due in May 2027.

== Premises ==
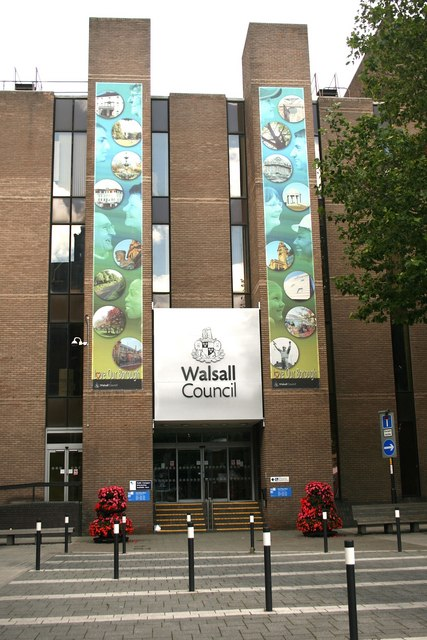
Civic Centre, Darwall Street

The council meets at the Council House on Lichfield Street, which had been completed in 1905 for the old borough council. It replaced the earlier Guildhall on High Street, which had been built in 1867 on a site which had been occupied by the town's guildhall from the fifteenth century. The council's main offices are in the Civic Centre on Darwall Street, which is linked to the Council House by a bridge over Darwall Street.

== Elections ==
Since the last boundary changes took effect in 2026, the council has comprised 60 councillors representing 20 wards, with each ward electing three councillors. Elections are held three years out of every four, with a third of the council (one councillor for each ward) being elected each time for a four-year term of office.
