= 2007 Walsall Metropolitan Borough Council election =

2007 UK local government election

Map of the results of the 2007 Walsall council election. Conservatives in blue, Labour in red, Liberal Democrats in yellow, independent in grey and Democratic Labour Party in pinky-red.

The 2007 Walsall Metropolitan Borough Council election took place on 3 May 2007 to elect members of Walsall Metropolitan Borough Council in the West Midlands, England. One third of the council was up for election and the Conservative Party stayed in overall control of the council.

After the election, the composition of the council was:

- Conservative 33
- Labour 18
- Liberal Democrats 6
- Independent 2
- Democratic Labour Party 1

== Background ==
After the last election in 2006 the Conservatives controlled the council with 34 seats, compared to 19 for Labour, 6 Liberal Democrats and 1 independent. However, in July 2006 2 Conservative councillors, Aqeel Aslam and Haqnawaz Khan of Pleck and St Matthews wards respectively, defected to Labour, leaving the Conservatives on 32 seats compared to 21 for Labour.

== Election result ==
The results saw the Conservatives gain 1 seat from Labour in Pleck, to move to 33 seats, and stay in control of the council. As well as the loss to the Conservatives, Labour lost a further 2 seats and so fell to 18 councillors. The other Labour losses came in Darlaston South, where independent Chris Bott gained the seat, and in Blakenall, where Peter Smith of the Democratic Labour Party, took the seat by 15 votes. Meanwhile, the Liberal Democrats won 2 seats and stayed on 6 councillors.

Walsall local election result 2007
Party	Seats	Gains	Losses	Net gain/loss	Seats %	Votes %	Votes	+/−
Conservative	12	1	0	+1	60.0	41.1	26,455	+1.8%
Labour	4	0	3	-3	20.0	29.3	18,845	+2.1%
Liberal Democrats	2	0	0	0	10.0	11.9	7,689	-2.2%
Independent	1	1	0	+1	5.0	3.9	2,483	+0.6%
Democratic Labour	1	1	0	+1	5.0	2.8	1,818	-0.1%
UKIP	0	0	0	0	0	5.5	3,567	+1.0%
BNP	0	0	0	0	0	3.3	2,123	-4.2%
Respect	0	0	0	0	0	1.3	825	+0.3%
Green	0	0	0	0	0	0.9	566	+0.7%

== Ward results ==
Aldridge Central and South
Party	Candidate	Votes	%	±%
Conservative	John Rochelle	2,310	55.7	+1.1
UKIP	Tony Lenton	775	18.7	+18.7
Labour	Walter Burley	625	15.1	+2.3
Liberal Democrats	Linda Dickins	436	10.5	+0.4
Majority		1,535	37.0	−0.3
Turnout		4,146	38.9	−2.0
Conservative hold		Swing		

Aldridge North and Walsall Wood
Party	Candidate	Votes	%	±%
Conservative	Mike Flower	2,175	66.9	+20.9
Liberal Democrats	Mark Greveson	548	16.9	+7.2
Labour	Ian Pearson	527	16.2	+1.1
Majority		1,627	50.1	+22.9
Turnout		3,250	31.6	−3.2
Conservative hold		Swing		

Bentley and Darlaston North
Party	Candidate	Votes	%	±%
Labour	Keith Chambers	1,216	46.4	+0.4
Conservative	Gurmeet Sohal	876	33.4	+4.1
Liberal Democrats	Christopher Pearce	429	16.4	−1.8
Democratic Labour	Alan Paddock	100	3.8	−2.7
Majority		340	13.0	−3.8
Turnout		2,621	29.0	+1.7
Labour hold		Swing		

Birchills Leamore
Party	Candidate	Votes	%	±%
Labour	Tim Oliver	1,114	49.3	+8.1
Conservative	Carol Rose	684	30.3	−8.0
Liberal Democrats	Wendy Evans	290	12.8	−0.4
Democratic Labour	Alan Davies	173	7.7	+0.4
Majority		430	19.0	+16.2
Turnout		2,261	24.4	−2.5
Labour hold		Swing		

Blakenall
Party	Candidate	Votes	%	±%
Democratic Labour	Peter Smith	921	38.8	+4.4
Labour	Robert Robinson	906	38.2	−7.7
Conservative	Hilda Derry	343	14.5	+5.2
Liberal Democrats	Louise Shires	107	4.5	−1.1
Green	Karl Macnaughton	95	4.0	−0.8
Majority		15	0.6	
Turnout		2,372	27.5	−0.3
Democratic Labour gain from Labour		Swing		

Bloxwich East
Party	Candidate	Votes	%	±%
Conservative	Lesley Beeley	1,063	41.8	+1.7
Labour	Robert Thomas	767	30.2	−10.4
Independent	Bill Smith	365	14.4	+14.4
UKIP	Alan Sheath	191	7.5	−3.6
Liberal Democrats	Jo Cameron	105	4.1	+0.1
Democratic Labour	Louise Bradburn	52	2.0	−2.2
Majority		296	11.6	
Turnout		2,543	29.7	−1.1
Conservative hold		Swing		

Bloxwich West
Party	Candidate	Votes	%	±%
Conservative	Des Pitt	1,358	43.9	+6.3
Labour	Fred Westley	1,157	37.4	+6.8
UKIP	Anthony Bryan	302	9.8	+9.8
Liberal Democrats	Christine Cockayne	176	5.7	−0.9
Democratic Labour	David Church	100	3.2	+0.1
Majority		201	6.5	−0.5
Turnout		3,093	31.7	−2.0
Conservative hold		Swing		

Brownhills
Party	Candidate	Votes	%	±%
Labour	Barbara Cassidy	1,181	39.0	+4.7
Conservative	Vivienne Aston	1,122	37.0	+2.0
BNP	William Locke	631	20.8	+0.2
Democratic Labour	Geoffrey Macmanomy	97	3.2	+0.7
Majority		59	2.0	
Turnout		3,031	31.5	+0.0
Labour hold		Swing		

Darlaston South
Party	Candidate	Votes	%	±%
Independent	Chris Bott	1,127	40.1	−13.5
Labour	Rose Burley	1,116	39.8	+7.6
Conservative	Cerwyn Edwards	365	13.0	−1.2
Green	Tim Martin	199	7.1	+7.1
Majority		11	0.4	−21.0
Turnout		2,807	30.7	+0.7
Independent gain from Labour		Swing		

Paddock
Party	Candidate	Votes	%	±%
Conservative	Barry Sanders	2,049	48.4	+3.7
Labour	Baldev Mavi	1,340	31.6	+7.0
UKIP	Derek Bennett	589	13.9	−1.6
Liberal Democrats	Muhammed Miah	259	6.1	−9.0
Majority		709	16.7	−3.4
Turnout		4,237	44.3	−2.9
Conservative hold		Swing		

Palfrey
Party	Candidate	Votes	%	±%
Conservative	Mohammad Yasin	1,649	38.2	−0.2
Labour	Allah Ditta	1,539	35.7	−5.0
Respect	Arshad Kanwar	617	14.3	+4.7
Liberal Democrats	Richard Cullum	507	11.8	+0.5
Majority		110	2.5	
Turnout		4,312	41.4	−0.2
Conservative hold		Swing		

Pelsall
Party	Candidate	Votes	%	±%
Conservative	Marco Longhi	1,649	43.8	−0.8
Independent	Sim Mayou	641	17.0	+17.0
Liberal Democrats	Grant Williams	391	10.4	+10.4
BNP	Dominic Buglar	358	9.5	−9.2
Independent	Amanda Ryder	350	9.3	+9.3
Labour	Jack Kelly	341	9.1	+1.6
Democratic Labour	Derek Roddy	32	0.9	−1.4
Majority		1,008	26.8	+9.2
Turnout		3,762	41.8	−0.4
Conservative hold		Swing		

Pheasey Park Farm
Party	Candidate	Votes	%	±%
Conservative	Michael Bird	1,780	54.8	+1.7
Labour	Douglas James	679	20.9	−0.2
UKIP	Steve Grey	504	15.5	−3.1
Green	Darren Smith	144	4.4	+4.4
Liberal Democrats	Trudy Pearce	141	4.3	−3.0
Majority		1,101	33.9	+1.9
Turnout		3,248	39.0	−2.1
Conservative hold		Swing		

Pleck
Party	Candidate	Votes	%	±%
Conservative	Mushtaq Ahmed	1,533	41.0	+8.2
Labour	Martin Evans	1,497	40.0	+3.8
Liberal Democrats	Norman Matthews	452	12.1	−3.1
UKIP	Rita Oakley	202	5.4	+5.4
Democratic Labour	Brian Powell	58	1.5	−1.0
Majority		36	1.0	
Turnout		3,742	38.5	+0.1
Conservative gain from Labour		Swing		

Rushall Shelfield
Party	Candidate	Votes	%	±%
Conservative	Albert Griffiths	1,304	42.3	−0.8
Labour	Angus McGhee	725	23.5	+3.5
BNP	Julie Locke	648	21.0	−4.7
Liberal Democrats	Ian Dickins	310	10.0	+1.2
Democratic Labour	Andrew Bradburn	99	3.2	+0.8
Majority		579	18.8	+1.4
Turnout		3,086	34.0	−1.0
Conservative hold		Swing		

Short Heath
Party	Candidate	Votes	%	±%
Liberal Democrats	Eileen Pitt	1,220	43.9	+2.0
Conservative	Chad Pitt	741	26.6	+5.0
BNP	Malcolm Moore	486	17.5	−4.6
Labour	Aftab Nawaz	335	12.0	−2.4
Majority		479	17.2	−2.5
Turnout		2,782	30.9	−0.8
Liberal Democrats hold		Swing		

St. Matthews
Party	Candidate	Votes	%	±%
Conservative	Barbara McCracken	1,516	39.4	+2.1
Labour	Richard Worrall	1,332	34.6	+6.7
Liberal Democrats	Daniel Barker	438	11.4	−11.0
Respect	Martin Lynch	208	5.4	−1.3
UKIP	Tim Melville	144	3.7	−1.9
Green	Robert Bellin	128	3.3	+3.3
Democratic Labour	Jack Peate	80	2.1	+2.1
Majority		184	4.8	−4.7
Turnout		3,846	40.5	−2.2
Conservative hold		Swing		

Streetly
Party	Candidate	Votes	%	±%
Conservative	Gary Clarke	2,780	70.8	−9.6
Labour	Steven King	686	17.5	−2.1
UKIP	Dorothy Sheath	461	11.7	+11.7
Majority		2,094	53.3	−7.6
Turnout		3,927	37.7	−1.1
Conservative hold		Swing		

Willnenhall North
Party	Candidate	Votes	%	±%
Liberal Democrats	Peter Hughes	1,125	42.8	−5.3
Conservative	Ann Ault	583	22.2	+5.2
Labour	Diane Coughlan	519	19.8	+3.9
UKIP	Elizabeth Hazell	399	15.2	−3.8
Majority		542	20.6	−8.5
Turnout		2,626	27.5	−1.2
Liberal Democrats hold		Swing		

Willenhall South
Party	Candidate	Votes	%	±%
Labour	Carl Creaney	1,243	46.4	+5.5
Liberal Democrats	Nadia Fazal	755	28.2	+4.2
Conservative	Jason Pitt	575	21.5	−6.8
Democratic Labour	Stephanie Peart	106	4.0	−2.8
Majority		488	18.2	+5.6
Turnout		2,679	25.2	−1.3
Labour hold		Swing		
