= 2010 Walsall Metropolitan Borough Council election =

2010 UK local government election

Map of the results of the 2010 Walsall council election. Conservatives in blue, Labour in red, Liberal Democrats in yellow and independent in grey.

The 2010 Walsall Metropolitan Borough Council election took place on 6 May 2010 to elect members of Walsall Metropolitan Borough Council in the West Midlands, England. One third of the council was up for election and the Conservative Party stayed in overall control of the council.

After the election, the composition of the council was:

- Conservative 33
- Labour 17
- Liberal Democrats 6
- Independent 2
- Democratic Labour Party 1
- Vacant 1

== Election results ==
The results saw the Conservatives remain in control of the council, with no change in their majority. Labour gained Birchills-Leamore from the Conservatives, but also lost St Matthews back to the Conservatives.

One seat was vacant in Bloxwich West after the election, as the former Conservative mayor of Walsall Melvin Pitt, whose seat had not been up for election, died on election night.

Walsall local election result 2010
Party	Seats	Gains	Losses	Net gain/loss	Seats %	Votes %	Votes	+/−
Conservative	10	1	1	0	50.0	39.5	45,500	-12.0
Labour	7	1	1	0	35.0	31.3	35,996	+6.5
Liberal Democrats	2	0	0	0	10.0	16.1	18,576	+3.9
Independent	1	0	0	0	5.0	3.4	3,910	+3.0
UKIP	0	0	0	0	0.0	5.5	6,293	+0.8
Green	0	0	0	0	0.0	1.4	1,560	-0.3
Democratic Labour	0	0	0	0	0.0	1.4	1,557	-2.1
BNP	0	0	0	0	0.0	1.1	1,289	+0.3
Pelsall Independent Alliance	0	0	0	0	0.0	0.4	413	+0.4

== Ward results ==
Aldridge Central and South
Party	Candidate	Votes	%	±%
Conservative	John O'Hare	3,827	51.8	−11.6
Liberal Democrats	Roy Sheward	1,446	19.6	+9.1
Labour	Sandy Bradie	1,324	17.9	+4.0
UKIP	Malcolm Ford	629	8.5	−3.7
Green	Mike Walters	155	2.1	+2.1
Majority		2,381	32.3	−17.2
Turnout		7,381	68.5	+34.9
Conservative hold		Swing		

Aldridge North and Walsall Wood
Party	Candidate	Votes	%	±%
Conservative	Anthony Harris	3,474	53.7	−17.1
Labour	Harry Bradie	1,423	22.0	+8.9
Liberal Democrats	Mark Greveson	1,318	20.4	+4.3
Green	Helen Rust	250	3.9	+3.9
Majority		2,051	31.7	−23.1
Turnout		6,465	64.6	+36.6
Conservative hold		Swing		

Bentley and Darlaston North
Party	Candidate	Votes	%	±%
Labour	Rose Burley	2,120	42.8	−1.1
Conservative	Gurmeet Sohal	1,487	30.0	−9.3
Liberal Democrats	Trudy Pearce	713	14.4	+9.6
UKIP	Anne Ford	590	11.9	+3.9
Democratic Labour	Alan Paddock	44	0.9	+0.1
Majority		633	12.8	+8.2
Turnout		4,954	55.6	+27.8
Labour hold		Swing		

Birchills-Leamore
Party	Candidate	Votes	%	±%
Labour	Lee Jeavons	1,773	37.1	−17.5
Conservative	Kamran Aftab	1,602	33.5	+2.5
Liberal Democrats	Christine Cockayne	608	12.7	+12.7
UKIP	James Sargent	524	11.0	+11.0
Democratic Labour	Alan Davies	136	2.8	−3.5
Green	Paul Booker	132	2.8	−5.3
Majority		171	3.6	−20.1
Turnout		4,775	50.7	+31.0
Labour gain from Conservative		Swing		

Blakenall
Party	Candidate	Votes	%	±%
Labour	Bob Thomas	1,576	40.9	+3.1
Conservative	Hilda Derry	1,029	26.7	+5.5
Democratic Labour	David Church	758	19.6	−14.4
Liberal Democrats	Natalie Woodruff	495	12.8	+5.8
Majority		547	14.2	+10.4
Turnout		3,858	46.3	+23.9
Labour hold		Swing		

Bloxwich East
Party	Candidate	Votes	%	±%
Labour	Kath Phillips	1,886	41.2	+15.8
Conservative	Clive Ault	1,638	35.8	−23.1
UKIP	Alan Sheath	467	10.2	+10.2
Liberal Democrats	Christopher Pearce	417	9.1	+0.2
Democratic Labour	Stephen Baggott	173	3.8	−3.0
Majority		248	5.4	
Turnout		4,581	54.2	+28.2
Labour hold		Swing		

Bloxwich West
Party	Candidate	Votes	%	±%
Conservative	Louise Harrison	2,329	40.7	−13.4
Labour	Fred Westley	2,008	35.1	+17.6
BNP	Chris Woodall	722	12.6	+12.6
Liberal Democrats	Roy Robinson	563	9.8	+6.0
Green	Zoe Henderson	97	1.7	+1.7
Majority		321	5.6	−31.0
Turnout		5,719	59.4	+31.9
Conservative hold		Swing		

Brownhills
Party	Candidate	Votes	%	±%
Conservative	Dave Turner	2,272	41.3	−25.3
Labour	Richard Worrall	2,021	36.7	+9.8
Liberal Democrats	John Garfitt	942	17.1	+17.1
Green	Peter Walters	164	3.0	+3.0
Democratic Labour	Andrew Bradburn	106	1.9	−4.6
Majority		251	4.6	−35.2
Turnout		5,505	58.7	+32.9
Conservative hold		Swing		

Darlaston South
Party	Candidate	Votes	%	±%
Independent	Paul Bott	1,761	36.0	+36.0
Labour	Ann Wilson	1,684	34.4	−2.4
Conservative	Jaqueline Perrins	968	19.8	−13.9
Liberal Democrats	Ramtirth Singh	477	9.8	+4.8
Majority		77	1.6	
Turnout		4,890	53.5	+30.4
Independent hold		Swing		

Paddock
Party	Candidate	Votes	%	±%
Conservative	Zahid Ali	2,933	42.9	−12.8
Labour	Walter Burley	1,905	27.8	+10.1
Liberal Democrats	Abdul Malik	733	10.7	+6.8
UKIP	Derek Bennett	643	9.4	+0.3
Independent	John Wood	630	9.2	+9.2
Majority		1,028	15.0	−33.1
Turnout		6,844	71.4	+35.8
Conservative hold		Swing		

Palfrey
Party	Candidate	Votes	%	±%
Labour	Mohammad Nazir	3,278	50.2	+10.4
Conservative	Mohammed Khan	2,017	30.9	−12.3
Liberal Democrats	Richard Cullum	1,235	18.9	+9.5
Majority		1,261	19.3	
Turnout		6,530	64.1	+25.0
Labour hold		Swing		

Pelsall
Party	Candidate	Votes	%	±%
Conservative	Oliver Bennett	2,750	45.9	−33.1
Independent	Sim Mayou	1,171	19.5	+19.5
Labour	Paul Forrest	1,107	18.5	+9.9
Pelsall Independent Alliance	Philip Evans	413	6.9	+6.9
UKIP	Dorothy Sheath	363	6.1	+6.1
Green	Alison Walters	123	2.1	+2.1
Democratic Labour	Derek Roddy	69	1.2	−0.9
Majority		1,579	26.3	−42.4
Turnout		5,996	66.9	+31.4
Conservative hold		Swing		

Pheasey Park Farm
Party	Candidate	Votes	%	±%
Conservative	Christopher Towe	2,960	50.1	−14.0
Labour	Jack Kelly	1,499	25.3	+10.4
UKIP	Steve Grey	780	13.2	−2.3
Liberal Democrats	Martin Barker	675	11.4	+5.8
Majority		1,461	24.7	−23.9
Turnout		5,914	68.6	+34.5
Conservative hold		Swing		

Pleck
Party	Candidate	Votes	%	±%
Labour	Harbans Sarohi	2,340	41.3	+5.6
Conservative	Gulfam Wali	1,790	31.6	−1.4
Liberal Democrats	Mohammed Yaqub	810	14.3	−6.1
UKIP	Rita Oakley	383	6.8	+1.7
Independent	Mark Dabbs	348	6.1	+0.3
Majority		550	9.7	+7.1
Turnout		5,671	60.1	+24.1
Labour hold		Swing		

Rushall-Shelfield
Party	Candidate	Votes	%	±%
Conservative	Rachel Andrew	2,348	43.8	−17.2
Labour	Martin Harrower	1,448	27.0	+7.3
Liberal Democrats	Roy Smith	956	17.8	+5.4
UKIP	Tim Melville	439	8.2	+8.2
Green	Karl Macnaughton	170	3.2	−3.7
Majority		900	16.8	−24.5
Turnout		5,361	60.3	+33.6
Conservative hold		Swing		

Short Heath
Party	Candidate	Votes	%	±%
Liberal Democrats	John Cook	2,053	38.2	−5.6
Conservative	Theresa Smith	1,544	28.7	−0.9
Labour	Doug Cleaver	1,200	22.3	+13.2
UKIP	Darren Hazell	574	10.7	+10.7
Majority		509	9.5	−4.7
Turnout		5,371	59.3	+31.3
Liberal Democrats hold		Swing		

St. Matthews
Party	Candidate	Votes	%	±%
Conservative	Imran Azam	2,565	42.1	−9.7
Labour	Eileen Russell	2,182	35.8	+2.9
Liberal Democrats	Khosru Miah	866	14.2	+9.1
Green	Robert Bellin	372	6.1	+2.0
Democratic Labour	Brian Powell	114	1.9	+0.7
Majority		383	6.3	−12.6
Turnout		6,099	63.1	+24.3
Conservative gain from Labour		Swing		

Streetly
Party	Candidate	Votes	%	±%
Conservative	Eddie Hughes	4,622	60.2	−12.3
Labour	Steven King	1,366	17.8	+5.3
Liberal Democrats	Shirley Balgobin	1,056	13.8	+7.7
UKIP	Paul Valdmanis	531	6.9	−2.0
Green	Leandra Gebrakedan	97	1.3	+1.3
Majority		3,256	42.4	−17.7
Turnout		7,672	71.2	+38.2
Conservative hold		Swing		

Willenhall North
Party	Candidate	Votes	%	±%
Liberal Democrats	Valerie Woodruff	1,903	32.9	−24.7
Conservative	Abi Pitt	1,667	28.8	+9.1
Labour	Gareth Walker	1,273	22.0	+9.9
BNP	Graham Hadlington	567	9.8	+9.8
UKIP	Liz Hazell	370	6.4	−4.2
Majority		236	4.1	−33.8
Turnout		5,780	61.7	+37.4
Liberal Democrats hold		Swing		

Willenhall South
Party	Candidate	Votes	%	±%
Labour	Diane Coughlan	2,583	45.1	+1.9
Conservative	Suky Samra	1,678	29.3	−2.0
Liberal Democrats	Daniel Barker	1,310	22.9	+3.2
Democratic Labour	Stephanie Peart	157	2.7	−3.1
Majority		905	15.8	+3.9
Turnout		5,728	54.3	+33.6
Labour hold		Swing		
