= ISCAS =

The acronym ISCAS may refer to:

- International Symposium on Circuits and Systems
- Institute of Software, Chinese Academy of Sciences
- Independent Sector Complaints Adjudication Service, an ombudsman scheme for private hospitals in the UK.
