= Unseating =

Political term about incumbents losing elections

Unseating is a political term which refers to a legislator who loses their seat in an election. A legislator who is unseated loses the right to sit in a legislative chamber. A landslide victory results in many legislators being unseated.

== Australia ==
In the 2025 Australian federal election, Liberal Party leader Peter Dutton lost his electorate of Dickson, the first time an opposition leader had been defeated in their own seat. Several days later, Greens leader Adam Bandt lost his seat of Melbourne.

== Canada ==
- List of MPs who lost their seat in the 2011 Canadian federal election
- List of MPs who lost their seat in the 2015 Canadian federal election
- List of MPs who lost their seat in the 2019 Canadian federal election
- List of MPs who lost their seat in the 2021 Canadian federal election
- List of MPs who lost their seat in the 2025 Canadian federal election

In the 2025 Canadian federal election, two sitting party leaders failed to win re-election to their parliamentary seats: Pierre Poilievre of the Conservative Party and Jagmeet Singh of the New Democratic Party (NDP).

== France ==
- List of MPs who lost their seat in the 2017 French legislative election
- List of MPs who lost their seat in the 2022 French legislative election
- List of MPs who lost their seat in the 2024 French legislative election

== Germany ==
- List of MPs who lost their seat in the 2021 German federal election
- List of MPs who lost their seat in the 2025 German federal election

== New Zealand ==
The only Prime Minister to lose their seat at an election was Sir Robert Stout in 1887. At the 1893 and 1919 elections the Leader of the Opposition (William Rolleston and Sir Joseph Ward respectively) was defeated.

== Russia ==
- List of members of the 7th Russian State Duma who were not re-elected

== Singapore ==
While unseating of Singaporean politicians are uncommon due to the governing People's Action Party winning seats, there are cases where the candidates lost their re-election (barring any by-elections):

- 1963 had 16 incumbent MPs from the previous legislative assembly being voted out, two of which, K. M. Byrne and Tan Kia Gan, were cabinet ministers.
- In 1984, Potong Pasir constituency MP Howe Yoon Chong retired and Mah Bow Tan was planned to be the successor to re-elect their PAP candidate into Potong Pasir. Mah was defeated to Singapore Democratic Party candidate Chiam See Tong in that election. Mah would be elected in the next election at Tampines GRC.
- In 1991, three candidates, Ng Pock Too, Tang Guan Seng, and the first female acting Cabinet Minister Seet Ai Mee, were defeated. Of the three, only Tang, who was defeated by the Workers' Party (WP) in Hougang SMC, was the only candidate to return to Parliament in the next election, electing in Ang Mo Kio GRC. Hougang is also the only constituency to be retained by the opposition (besides the already-held Potong Pasir) as the PAP was able to reclaim back the other two seats they lost in that election.
- In 2011, the WP team won Aljunied GRC, making it the first instance where any opposition party claimed a GRC since the scheme was introduced in 1988. Four of the five Aljunied GRC MPs, Cabinet ministers Lim Hwee Hua and George Yeo, Senior Minister of State Zainul Abidin, and backbencher Cynthia Phua, lost, and later retired from politics; the only Aljunied GRC PAP MP to be re-elected was Yeo Guat Kwang, as his division was redrawn into Ang Mo Kio GRC. The new candidate part of the Aljunied GRC team, Ong Ye Kung, would enter Parliament in the next election at Sembawang GRC. Additionally, Singapore People's Party chief Chiam See Tong and his team was defeated in Bishan-Toa Payoh GRC, in addition to losing their Potong Pasir seat back to the PAP.
- In 2015, Ang Mo Kio GRC MP Yeo Guat Kwang (who challenged in Aljunied GRC) and Punggol East SMC WP MP Lee Li Lian, who was elected in a by-election in 2013, both lost their seats at a narrow margin.
- In 2020, the newly-created Sengkang GRC was won by WP, being the first instance where an opposition captured a new constituency on its first attempt. The four-member PAP team comprises three sitting MPs including then-cabinet minister Ng Chee Meng and a Senior Minister of State Lam Pin Min. Unlike in Aljunied's case, both Ng and Lam did not retire from politics; Ng was re-elected in Parliament at Jalan Kayu SMC in the next election while Lam was again defeated in attempts to gain Sengkang GRC.
- In 2025, former Aljunied GRC MP Faisal Manap moved to Tampines GRC to lead his team there, and was later defeated. While one non-constituency Member of Parliament seat was offered to the team per being one of the best-performing non-elected teams that election, WP chose Eileen Chong instead, which effectively unseating Manap.

== United Kingdom ==
Unseating influential Members of Parliament is a goal of opposition parties. MPs representing marginal constituencies are usually at higher risk of being unseated.

=== Notable Unseatings ===
At the 1918 election following the First World War, former Prime Minister, the Liberal leader and leader of the opposition H. H. Asquith lost a seat he had held since 1886. A biographer said of this "the blow was crippling, a personal humiliation which destroyed his hope of exercising any influence on the peace settlement."

Chris Patten, Chairman of the Conservative Party and Gerry Adams, President of Sinn Fein were unseated in 1992. Michael Portillo, widely expected to be the next Conservative leader, lost his seat at the 1997 general election, an event which coined the expression "Portillo moment".

At the 2015 general election, Labour MP Ed Balls and Liberal Democrat MP Simon Hughes were unseated in political upsets. In 2017, Former leader of the Liberal Democrats Nick Clegg was unseated by the Labour Party. In 2019, the Liberal Democrat leader, Jo Swinson, was unseated by the Scottish National Party. At the 2024 general election, former Prime Minister Liz Truss, record number of Conservative MPs and cabinet members lost their seats.

=== Lists ===
- List of MPs who lost their seat in the 1997 United Kingdom general election
- List of MPs who lost their seat in the 2010 United Kingdom general election
- List of MPs who lost their seat in the 2015 United Kingdom general election
- List of MPs who lost their seat in the 2017 United Kingdom general election
- List of MPs who lost their seat in the 2019 United Kingdom general election
- List of MPs who lost their seat in the 2024 United Kingdom general election

== United States ==
When an incumbent Member of Congress runs for re-election they may be unseated in the general election. This is more likely if the politician represents a swing state or swing district.

== See also ==
- Parliament
