= List of MPs who lost their seat in the 2017 United Kingdom general election =

This is a list of MPs who lost their seat at the 2017 general election, together with the last date when each seat was represented by a different party.

Party	Name	Constituency	Office held whilst in Parliament	Year elected	Seat held by party since	Defeated by	Party
Conservative	Caroline Ansell	Eastbourne		2015	2015	Stephen Lloyd	Liberal Democrats
Conservative	Gavin Barwell	Croydon Central	Minister of State for Housing and Planning	2010	2010	Sarah Jones	Labour
Conservative	James Berry	Kingston and Surbiton		2015	2015	Ed Davey	Liberal Democrats
Conservative	Andrew Bingham	High Peak		2010	2010	Ruth George	Labour
Conservative	Nicola Blackwood	Oxford West and Abingdon	Parliamentary Under Secretary of State for Public Health & Innovation	2010	2010	Layla Moran	Liberal Democrats
Conservative	Victoria Borwick	Kensington		2015	2010 (created)	Emma Dent Coad	Labour
Conservative	Julian Brazier	Canterbury	Minister of State for Reserves (2014–2016)	1987	1918	Rosie Duffield	Labour
Conservative	David Burrowes	Enfield Southgate	Parliamentary Private Secretary to the Secretary of State for Environment, Food and Rural Affairs (2012–2014)	2005	2005	Bambos Charalambous	Labour
Conservative	Neil Carmichael	Stroud	Chair of the Education Select Committee	2010	2010	David Drew	Labour
Conservative	Oliver Colvile	Plymouth Sutton and Devonport		2010	2010 (created)	Luke Pollard	Labour
Conservative	Byron Davies	Gower		2015	2015	Tonia Antoniazzi	Labour
Conservative	James Davies	Vale of Clwyd		2015	2015	Chris Ruane	Labour
Conservative	Flick Drummond	Portsmouth South		2015	2015	Stephen Morgan	Labour
Conservative	Jane Ellison	Battersea	Financial Secretary to the Treasury	2010	2010	Marsha de Cordova	Labour
Conservative	Graham Evans	Weaver Vale		2010	2010	Mike Amesbury	Labour
Conservative	Richard Fuller	Bedford		2010	2010	Mohammed Yasin	Labour
Conservative	Ben Gummer	Ipswich	Minister for the Cabinet Office, Paymaster General	2010	2010	Sandy Martin	Labour
Conservative	Kris Hopkins	Keighley	Parliamentary Under Secretary of State Northern Ireland Office	2010	2010	John Grogan	Labour
Conservative	Ben Howlett	Bath		2015	2015	Wera Hobhouse	Liberal Democrats
Conservative	Stewart Jackson	Peterborough	Parliamentary Private Secretary to the Secretary of State for Exiting the European Union	2005	2005	Fiona Onasanya	Labour
Conservative	Simon Kirby	Brighton Kemptown	Economic Secretary to the Treasury	2010	2010	Lloyd Russell-Moyle	Labour
Conservative	Charlotte Leslie	Bristol North West		2010	2010	Darren Jones	Labour
Conservative	Tania Mathias	Twickenham		2015	2015	Vince Cable	Liberal Democrats
Conservative	Jason McCartney	Colne Valley		2010	2010	Thelma Walker	Labour
Conservative	Karl McCartney	Lincoln		2010	2010	Karen Lee	Labour
Conservative	David Mowat	Warrington South	Parliamentary Undersecretary of State for Care and Support	2010	2010	Faisal Rashid	Labour
Conservative	David Nuttall	Bury North		2010	2010	James Frith	Labour
Conservative	Amanda Solloway	Derby North		2015	2015	Chris Williamson	Labour
Conservative	Edward Timpson	Crewe and Nantwich	Minister of State for Children and Families	2008	2008	Laura Smith	Labour
Conservative	James Wharton	Stockton South	Parliamentary Under-Secretary of State for International Development	2010	2010	Paul Williams	Labour
Conservative	Chris White	Warwick and Leamington		2010	2010	Matt Western	Labour
Conservative	Craig Williams	Cardiff North		2015	2010	Anna McMorrin	Labour
Conservative	Rob Wilson	Reading East	Minister for Civil Society	2005	2005	Matt Rodda	Labour
SNP	Tasmina Ahmed-Sheikh	Ochil and South Perthshire	SNP International Trade Spokeswoman	2015	2015	Luke Graham	Conservative
SNP	Richard Arkless	Dumfries and Galloway		2015	2015	Alister Jack	Conservative
SNP	Phil Boswell	Coatbridge, Chryston and Bellshill		2015	2015	Hugh Gaffney	Labour
SNP	Stuart Donaldson	West Aberdeenshire and Kincardine		2015	2015	Andrew Bowie	Conservative
SNP	Margaret Ferrier	Rutherglen and Hamilton West		2015	2015	Ged Killen	Labour
SNP	George Kerevan	East Lothian		2015	2015	Martin Whitfield	Labour
SNP	Calum Kerr	Berwickshire, Roxburgh and Selkirk	SNP Environment & Rural Affairs Spokesman	2015	2015	John Lamont	Conservative
SNP	Callum McCaig	Aberdeen South	SNP Energy Spokesman	2015	2015	Ross Thomson	Conservative
SNP	Anne McLaughlin	Glasgow North East		2015	2015	Paul Sweeney	Labour
SNP	Paul Monaghan	Caithness, Sutherland and Easter Ross		2015	2015	Jamie Stone	Liberal Democrats
SNP	Roger Mullin	Kirkcaldy and Cowdenbeath		2015	2015	Lesley Laird	Labour
SNP	John Nicolson	East Dunbartonshire	SNP Culture, Media and Sport Spokesperson	2015	2015	Jo Swinson	Liberal Democrats
SNP	Kirsten Oswald	East Renfrewshire		2015	2015	Paul Masterton	Conservative
SNP	Steven Paterson	Stirling		2015	2015	Stephen Kerr	Conservative
SNP	Angus Robertson	Moray	Leader of the Scottish National Party in the House of Commons	2001	1987	Douglas Ross	Conservative
SNP	Alex Salmond	Gordon	SNP Foreign Affairs Spokesman	2015	2015	Colin Clark	Conservative
SNP	Owen Thompson	Midlothian		2015	2015	Danielle Rowley	Labour
SNP	Mike Weir	Angus	SNP Chief Whip	2001	1997 (seat created)	Kirstene Hair	Conservative
SNP	Eilidh Whiteford	Banff and Buchan	SNP Work & Pensions Spokesman	2010	1987	David Duguid	Conservative
SNP	Corri Wilson	Ayr, Carrick and Cumnock		2015	2015	Bill Grant	Conservative
Labour	Natascha Engel	North East Derbyshire	Second Deputy Chairman of Ways and Means	2005	1935	Lee Rowley	Conservative
Labour	Rob Flello	Stoke-on-Trent South		2005	1950 (seat created)	Jack Brereton	Conservative
Labour	Alan Meale	Mansfield		1987	1923	Ben Bradley	Conservative
Labour	David Winnick	Walsall North		1979	1979	Eddie Hughes	Conservative
Liberal Democrats	Nick Clegg	Sheffield Hallam	Deputy Prime Minister of the United Kingdom (2010–2015)	2005	1997	Jared O'Mara	Labour
Liberal Democrats	Greg Mulholland	Leeds North West	Liberal Democrat Campaigns and Communications Chair	2005	2005	Alex Sobel	Labour
Liberal Democrats	Sarah Olney	Richmond Park		2016	2016	Zac Goldsmith	Conservative
Liberal Democrats	Mark Williams	Ceredigion	Liberal Democrat Wales Spokesman	2005	2005	Ben Lake	Plaid Cymru
SDLP	Mark Durkan	Foyle	Leader of the Social Democratic and Labour Party (2001–2010)	2005	2005	Elisha McCallion	Sinn Féin
SDLP	Alasdair McDonnell	Belfast South	Leader of the Social Democratic and Labour Party (2011–2015)	2005	2005	Emma Pengelly	DUP
SDLP	Margaret Ritchie	South Down	Leader of the Social Democratic and Labour Party (2010–2011)	2010	1987	Chris Hazzard	Sinn Féin
UUP	Tom Elliott	Fermanagh and South Tyrone		2015	2015	Michelle Gildernew	Sinn Féin
UUP	Danny Kinahan	South Antrim		2015	2015	Paul Girvan	DUP
Independent	Simon Danczuk (Note: Danczuk was elected as a Labour MP in 2010, but was suspended from the party following allegations of sending sexually explicit text messages to a 17-year-old girl. He stood again as an independent, but came 5th with 883 votes (1.8%).)	Rochdale		2010 (as Labour)	2015	Tony Lloyd	Labour

== Open seats changing hands ==
Party	Candidate	Incumbent retiring from the House	Constituency	Defeated by	Party
Independent	Paul Oakley (UKIP)	Douglas Carswell (elected as UKIP) (Note: Carswell was elected as a UKIP MP in 2015 after defecting from the Conservatives in 2014. He left UKIP in 2017 to sit as an independent, and chose not to stand again.)	Clacton	Giles Watling	Conservative
Independent	Toni Giugliano (SNP)	Michelle Thomson (elected as SNP) (Note: Thomson was elected as an SNP MP in 2015, but resigned from the party whip and gave up her SNP membership later that year, following the announcement of a police inquiry into allegations made against her.)	Edinburgh West	Christine Jardine	Liberal Democrats
Labour	Tracey Harvey	Tom Blenkinsop	Middlesbrough South and East Cleveland	Simon Clarke	Conservative
Liberal Democrats	Sue McGuire	John Pugh	Southport	Damien Moore	Conservative
