= 1976 Walsall North by-election =

UK parliamentary by-election

← Oct. 1974	4 November 1976	1979 →

Constituency of Walsall North
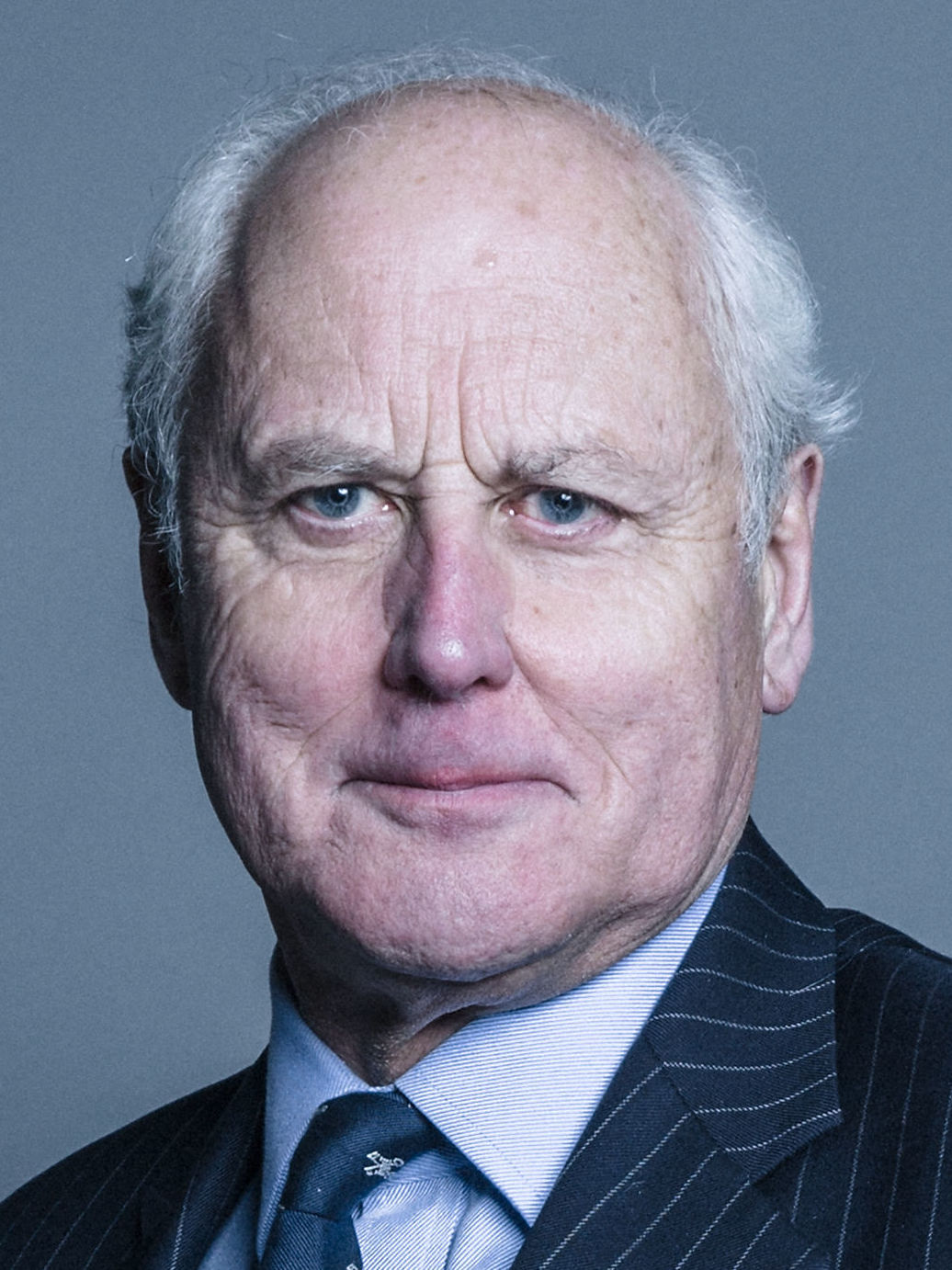
	First party	Second party
		Lab
Candidate	Robin Hodgson	David Winnick
Party	Conservative	Labour
Popular vote	16,212	11,833
Percentage	43.35%	31.64%
Swing	▲17.2%	▼27.85%
	Third party	Fourth party
	Ind.	NF
Candidate	Sidney Wright	Joseph Parker
Party	Independent	National Front
Popular vote	4,374	2,724
Percentage	11.70%	7.28%
Swing	N/A	N/A
MP before election
John Stonehouse
English National
Elected MP
Robin Hodgson
Conservative

The 1976 Walsall North by-election on 4 November 1976 was held after the resignation of sitting Member of Parliament (MP) John Stonehouse. Elected as a Labour candidate, Stonehouse was a member of the English National Party when he resigned, after an interlude in which he faked his own death. The English National Party did not contest the by-election, the first occasion on which the incumbent's party did not do so since the 1963 Bristol South East by-election, and the last until the 1995 North Down by-election.

Amidst the confusion, the Conservative Party gained the seat in the by-election.

The by-election was also noted for the performance of independent candidate Sidney Wright, the debut of the Ecology Party and the split of the far right vote due to the appearance of both the National Front and their splinter group the National Party on the ballots. The Liberal Party could take only fifth place, their worst ever placing in a by-election in England. The party had previously come fifth in Wales in the 1972 Merthyr Tydfil by-election, and next placed so low at the 1989 Glasgow Central by-election.

The by-election also saw a record number of candidates, beating the long-standing record of seven who contested the 1920 Stockport by-election, where two seats were available, a total first reached in a single-member by-election in the 1962 Dorset South by-election. This record was again beaten at the 1977 City of London and Westminster South by-election.

Joseph Parker, the National Front candidate, would go on to be father-in-law to John Tyndall, the leader of the National Front, after Tyndall married Parker's daughter Valerie in 1977.

== Result ==
Walsall North by-Election, 1976
Party	Candidate	Votes	%	±%
Conservative	Robin Hodgson	16,212	43.35	+17.2
Labour	David Winnick	11,833	31.64	−27.85
Independent	Sidney Wright	4,374	11.70	New
National Front	Joseph Parker	2,724	7.28	New
Liberal	Frances Oborski	1,212	3.24	−13.1
Socialist Workers	James McCallum	574	1.53	New
National Party	Marian Powell	258	0.69	New
Ecology	Jonathan Tyler	181	0.48	New
Air, Road, Public Safety, White Resident	Bill Boaks	30	0.08	New
Majority		4,379	11.71	N/A
Turnout		37,398		
Conservative gain from English National		Swing	+22.5	

== See also ==
- United Kingdom by-election records
