= Stanley Evans =

British politician (1898–1970)

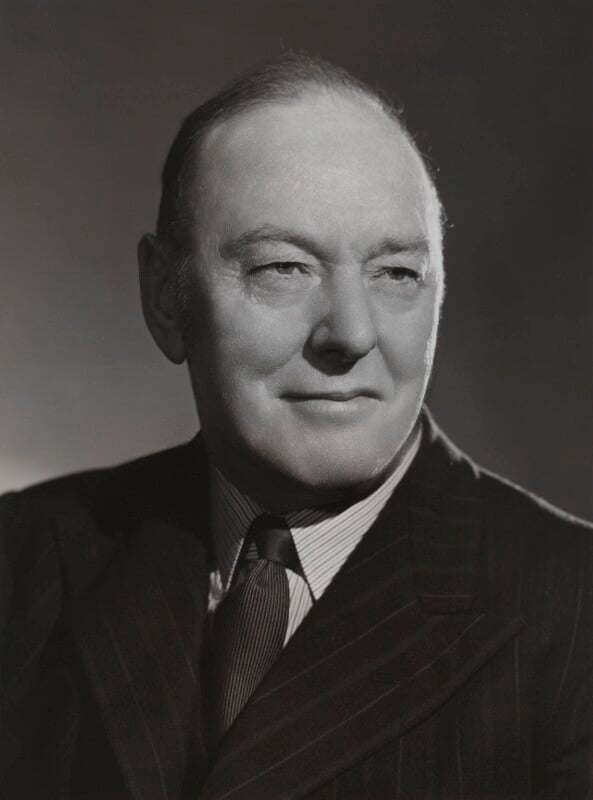
Evans in 1950

Stanley Norman Evans (1 February 1898 – 25 June 1970) was a British industrialist and Labour Party politician. He served very briefly as an Agriculture Minister in the post-war Attlee government but was forced to resign when he claimed that farmers were being "featherbedded". During the Suez Crisis, Evans broke from the party line and supported the Conservative government's policy, which led his local association successfully to press him to resign from Parliament.

== Wartime service ==
Evans was a native of Birmingham where he went to Harborne Elementary School. His first job after leaving school was in a chartered accountants firm, but in 1915 he left to enlist in the Northumberland Hussars. He served in France and Belgium during the First World War, and was discharged in 1919.

== Industry ==
Returning to the West Midlands, Evans established Stanley N. Evans (Birmingham) Ltd, who supplied sand for moulds used in the many cast metal foundries in the Black Country. Evans was also involved in the publishing industry, being Chairman of Town Crier Publishing Society Ltd. During the Second World War, Evans was a road transport organiser employed by the Ministry of War Transport.

== Election to Parliament ==
Evans was chosen as Labour Party candidate for Wednesbury to follow John Banfield, who died at the end of May 1945 while still in post. At the 1945 general election he had no difficulty in being elected, winning a majority of 15,935.

In his maiden speech on 22 August 1945, Evans spoke in a debate on the ratification of the United Nations Charter. He concentrated on the post-war reconstruction and opposed attempts to indict 70,000,000 Germans for the misdeeds of a few. In October he criticised the restrictive practices of trade associations in several fields of industry, and urged an investigation into their activities. His speech drew a protest from Imperial Chemical Industries Ltd, whom he had singled out. Evans opposed the Anglo-American loan and the Bretton Woods agreement.

== Steel nationalisation ==
Evans was a supporter of economic planning who was very conscious of his origins in the industrial midlands of England; in a debate in February 1946 he declared to laughter and cheers that "the elbow grease would be forthcoming from those who had always saved Britain – the common people, the best bred mongrels in the world". He distrusted the Soviet Union for its "constant stream of vilification, invective and abuse" directed at the British people, and in June 1947 made an outspoken attack on Soviet domination of Europe led by the "hermits of the Kremlin".

In a free vote on abolition of the death penalty, Evans spoke loudly in support of retaining capital punishment on the grounds that public opinion was not supportive, and reported that the people to whom he spoke were concerned that too many condemned prisoners were being reprieved. He was also a supporter of the Government's plan to nationalise the steel industry, which was the most controversial of all its nationalisation proposals. Because of his experience in the industry, Evans was placed on the Standing Committee examining the Bill.

== Ministry of Food ==
Evans was re-elected for Wednesbury at the 1950 general election, his majority almost unchanged on that of 1945 despite a three-way fight. In the government reshuffle that followed, he was appointed Parliamentary Secretary to the Ministry of Food. At his first press conference on 17 March, a fortnight into his job, Evans warned that Britain "must be careful not to cosset any section of the population at the expense of the community as a whole". He said the Ministry should consider themselves the representatives of housewives; later Evans had to stress that these were his personal views.

He had a tough debut on the front bench of the House of Commons on 3 April 1950 when he made a statement about Commonwealth sugar negotiations. Many Members of Parliament thought that the West Indies had been treated discourteously and the Leader of the House of Commons Herbert Morrison had to come to the aid of the junior Food Minister.

=== Controversy ===
The controversy caused by his initial press conference had continued. The National Farmers Union had protested and the Minister (Maurice Webb) had to give an assurance to them that the Ministry would fail if it did not assist food producers. However, Evans was to cause further problems at a press conference in Manchester on 14 April. He asserted that farmers were provided with guaranteed prices and assured markets at taxpayers' expense, and asked how long it could continue. Evans then went on to claim that subsidies concealed inefficiency and inertia, and commented that "no other nation feather-beds its agriculture like Britain".

=== Dismissal ===
The National Farmers Unions of England and Wales, Scotland and Northern Ireland immediately responded in a joint statement expressing their amazement and giving detailed figures to refute his argument. At this Clement Attlee asked for Evans' resignation, dismissing him from office after only six weeks. Evans stuck by his opinions even though "the National Farmers' Unions have my scalp under their belt". He later denied as "fantastic" rumours that he intended to resign his Parliamentary seat. On 16 May Evans used a debate on the Finance Bill to set out a full defence of his charges against agriculture.

== Parliamentary activity ==
Evans opposed the opening of Battersea Park funfair on Sundays, saying it would cause dismay to millions of people. Despite his sacking he paid tribute to Attlee for his statesmanlike diplomacy with the United States over the Korean War. He was a frequent member of Parliamentary delegations to other countries, including that to Hungary in 1946. In 1951 he led a delegation to Northern and Southern Rhodesia, Nyasaland, Mauritius and Malta. He was also a member of a delegation to the Soviet Union in 1954.

In 1953 Evans annoyed his own side by speaking against a Labour amendment on the issue of the Central African Federation. He agreed with the Conservative government that federation would lead to economic development and would make Central Africa the Ruhr Valley of Africa. He was a cautious supporter of German rearmament, because it would assist in the defence against Soviet expansionism.

== Attitude toward America ==
The summer of 1956 saw Evans involved in two controversies, first over the sale of the Trinidad Oil Company to the Texas Oil Company, and second over his allegation that the United States was discriminating against British shipping. When speaking at the outbreak of the Suez Crisis, Evans was critical of the lack of American support for what he described as the British crusade against totalitarianism.

== Suez ==
As the situation became more grave, Evans pressed Prime Minister Anthony Eden to withhold military action until Parliament had debated it. When Eden called a vote of confidence on 1 November 1956, Evans abstained from voting rather than vote with his party against the Government; he was the only Labour Member of Parliament to break the whip but was not disciplined for his failure to vote.

=== Constituency discontent ===
However, Evans' tacit support for the invasion of Suez caused unrest in his constituency. After several local organisations sent in resolutions strongly condemning his action, the Wednesbury divisional Labour Party called a meeting to discuss his future on 17 November. Evans spoke in defence of his position, but the meeting unanimously passed a resolution calling on Evans to resign his seat. A few days later, Evans complied, also resigning from membership of the Labour Party. He declared that when military action had begun, it was "against the best interests of the British people to divide the House of Commons while fighting was still in progress".

Although supporters of Evans raised a petition asking him to stand for re-election as an Independent candidate, Evans rejected the idea of standing again under any banner. He declared that he was not a turncoat and would do nothing to embarrass his friends in the Parliamentary Labour Party.

== Death ==
Having held to his decision, Evans died of cancer in 1970 aged 72.

Parliament of the United Kingdom
Preceded by John Banfield	Member of Parliament for Wednesbury; 1945 – 1956	Succeeded by John Stonehouse
Political offices
Preceded by Edith Summerskill	Parliamentary Secretary to the Ministry of Food; March – April 1950	Succeeded by Frederick Willey
