= 2008 Walsall Metropolitan Borough Council election =

2008 UK local government election

Map of the results of the 2008 Walsall council election. Conservatives in blue, Labour in red and Liberal Democrats in yellow.

The 2008 Walsall Metropolitan Borough Council election took place on 1 May 2008 to elect members of Walsall Metropolitan Borough Council in the West Midlands, England. One third of the council was up for election and the Conservative Party stayed in overall control of the council.

After the election, the composition of the council was:

- Conservative 33
- Labour 18
- Liberal Democrats 6
- Independent 2
- Democratic Labour Party 1

== Election result ==
Walsall local election result 2008
Party	Seats	Gains	Losses	Net gain/loss	Seats %	Votes %	Votes	+/−
Conservative	12	0	0	0	60.0	51.5	28,664	+10.4%
Labour	6	0	0	0	30.0	24.8	13,807	-4.5%
Liberal Democrats	2	0	0	0	10.0	12.2	6,767	+0.3%
UKIP	0	0	0	0	0	4.7	2,600	-0.8%
Democratic Labour	0	0	0	0	0	3.5	1,922	+0.7%
Green	0	0	0	0	0	1.7	919	+0.8%
BNP	0	0	0	0	0	0.8	436	-2.5%
Respect	0	0	0	0	0	0.5	304	-0.8%
Independent	0	0	0	0	0	0.4	203	-3.5%

== Ward results ==
Aldridge Central and South
Party	Candidate	Votes	%	±%
Conservative	Thomas Ansell	2,306	63.4	+7.7
Labour	Derek Wigfall	507	13.9	−1.2
UKIP	Michael Jose	442	12.2	−6.5
Liberal Democrats	Royston Sheward	382	10.5	0.0
Majority		1,799	49.5	+12.5
Turnout		3,637	33.6	−5.3
Conservative hold		Swing		

Aldridge North and Walsall Wood
Party	Candidate	Votes	%	±%
Conservative	Keith Sears	2,046	70.8	+3.9
Liberal Democrats	Mark Greveson	464	16.1	−0.8
Labour	Ian Pearson	378	13.1	−3.1
Majority		1,582	54.8	+4.7
Turnout		2,888	28.0	−3.6
Conservative hold		Swing		

Bentley and Darlaston North
Party	Candidate	Votes	%	±%
Labour	Stanley Madeley	1,087	43.9	−2.5
Conservative	Gurmeet Sohal	972	39.3	+5.9
UKIP	Malcolm Ford	198	8.0	+8.0
Liberal Democrats	Christopher Pearce	118	4.8	−11.6
Green	Stephen Brookes	78	3.2	+3.2
Democratic Labour	Alan Paddock	21	0.8	−3.0
Majority		115	4.6	−8.4
Turnout		2,474	27.8	−1.2
Labour hold		Swing		

Birchills-Leamore
Party	Candidate	Votes	%	±%
Labour	Joan Barton	958	54.6	+5.3
Conservative	Chad Pitt	543	31.0	+0.7
Green	Paul Booker	142	8.1	+8.1
Democratic Labour	Alan Davies	110	6.3	−1.4
Majority		415	23.7	+4.7
Turnout		1,753	19.7	−4.7
Labour hold		Swing		

Blakenall
Party	Candidate	Votes	%	±%
Labour	Ian Robertson	692	37.8	−0.4
Democratic Labour	David Church	622	34.0	−4.8
Conservative	Hilda Derry	388	21.2	+6.7
Liberal Democrats	Trudy Pearce	128	7.0	+2.5
Majority		70	3.8	
Turnout		1,830	22.4	−5.1
Labour hold		Swing		

Bloxwich East
Party	Candidate	Votes	%	±%
Conservative	William Tweddle	1,308	58.9	+17.1
Labour	Angus McGhee	563	25.4	−4.8
Liberal Democrats	Christine Cockayne	198	8.9	+4.8
Democratic Labour	Stephen Baggott	151	6.8	+4.8
Majority		745	33.6	+22.0
Turnout		2,220	26.0	−3.7
Conservative hold		Swing		

Bloxwich West
Party	Candidate	Votes	%	±%
Conservative	Melvin Pitt	1,436	54.1	+10.2
Labour	Robert Thomas	465	17.5	−19.9
Democratic Labour	Michael Ross	365	13.8	+10.6
UKIP	Anthony Bryan	286	10.8	+1.0
Liberal Democrats	Stanley Robinson	102	3.8	−1.9
Majority		971	36.6	+30.1
Turnout		2,654	27.5	−4.2
Conservative hold		Swing		

Brownhills
Party	Candidate	Votes	%	±%
Conservative	Alan Paul	1,642	66.6	+29.6
Labour	Paul Forrest	662	26.9	−12.1
Democratic Labour	Andrew Bradburn	160	6.5	+3.3
Majority		980	39.7	
Turnout		2,464	25.8	−5.7
Conservative hold		Swing		

Darlaston South
Party	Candidate	Votes	%	±%
Labour	Graham Wilkes	775	36.8	−3.0
Conservative	Doris Silvester	709	33.7	+20.7
Green	Timothy Martin	264	12.5	+5.4
Democratic Labour	Alan Johnston	253	12.0	+12.0
Liberal Democrats	Murli Sinha	105	5.0	+5.0
Majority		66	3.1	
Turnout		2,106	23.1	−7.6
Labour hold		Swing		

Paddock
Party	Candidate	Votes	%	±%
Conservative	Rose Martin	2,249	65.7	+17.3
Labour	Ann Wilson	605	17.7	−13.9
UKIP	Derek Bennett	310	9.1	−4.8
Liberal Democrats	Muhammad Miah	135	3.9	−2.2
Green	Murray Abbott	122	3.6	+3.6
Majority		1,644	48.1	+21.4
Turnout		3,421	35.6	−8.7
Conservative hold		Swing		

Palfrey
Party	Candidate	Votes	%	±%
Conservative	Mohammad Munir	1,736	43.2	+5.0
Labour	Allah Ditta	1,602	39.8	+4.1
Liberal Democrats	Richard Cullum	380	9.4	−2.4
Respect	Arshad Kanwar	304	7.6	−6.7
Majority		134	3.3	+0.7
Turnout		4,022	39.1	−2.3
Conservative hold		Swing		

Pelsall
Party	Candidate	Votes	%	±%
Conservative	Garry Perry	2,532	79.0	+35.2
Liberal Democrats	Leslie Smith	331	10.3	−0.1
Labour	Martin Harrower	276	8.6	−0.5
Democratic Labour	Derek Roddy	67	2.1	+1.2
Majority		2,201	68.7	+41.9
Turnout		3,206	35.5	−6.3
Conservative hold		Swing		

Pheasey Park Farm
Party	Candidate	Votes	%	±%
Conservative	Adrian Andrew	1,846	64.1	+9.3
UKIP	Steven Grey	446	15.5	0.0
Labour	Douglas James	430	14.9	−6.0
Liberal Democrats	Daniel Barker	160	5.6	+1.3
Majority		1,400	48.6	+14.7
Turnout		2,882	34.1	−4.9
Conservative hold		Swing		

Pleck
Party	Candidate	Votes	%	±%
Labour	Dennis Anson	1,241	35.7	−4.3
Conservative	Shakil Abbas	1,150	33.0	−8.0
Liberal Democrats	Mohammed Yaqub	709	20.4	+8.3
Independent	Martin Lynch	203	5.8	+5.8
UKIP	Kathleen Oakley	177	5.1	−0.3
Majority		91	2.7	
Turnout		3,480	36.0	−2.5
Labour hold		Swing		

Rushall-Shelfield
Party	Candidate	Votes	%	±%
Conservative	Catherine Micklewright	1,480	61.0	+18.7
Labour	Jack Kelly	477	19.7	−3.8
Liberal Democrats	John Garfitt	302	12.4	+2.4
Green	Karl Macnaughton	167	6.9	+6.9
Majority		1,003	41.3	+22.5
Turnout		2,426	26.7	−7.3
Conservative hold		Swing		

Short Heath
Party	Candidate	Votes	%	±%
Liberal Democrats	Doreen Shires	1,082	43.8	−0.1
Conservative	Ann Ault	731	29.6	+3.0
BNP	Malcolm Moore	436	17.6	+0.1
Labour	Aftab Nawaz	224	9.1	−2.9
Majority		351	14.2	−3.0
Turnout		2,473	28.0	−2.9
Liberal Democrats hold		Swing		

St. Matthews
Party	Candidate	Votes	%	±%
Conservative	Mohammed Arif	1,864	51.8	+12.4
Labour	Richard Worrall	1,184	32.9	−1.7
Liberal Democrats	Abdul Malik	184	5.1	−6.3
UKIP	Timothy Melville	178	4.9	+1.2
Green	Robert Bellin	146	4.1	+0.8
Democratic Labour	Brian Powell	44	1.2	−0.9
Majority		680	18.9	+14.1
Turnout		3,600	38.8	−1.7
Conservative hold		Swing		

Streetly
Party	Candidate	Votes	%	±%
Conservative	Brian Douglas-Maul	2,575	72.5	+1.7
Labour	Steven King	442	12.5	−5.0
UKIP	Dorothy Sheath	317	8.9	−2.8
Liberal Democrats	Shirley Balgobin	216	6.1	+6.1
Majority		2,133	60.1	+6.8
Turnout		3,550	33.0	−4.7
Conservative hold		Swing		

Willenhall North
Party	Candidate	Votes	%	±%
Liberal Democrats	Ian Shires	1,332	57.6	+14.8
Conservative	Cerwyn Edwards	455	19.7	−2.5
Labour	Diane Coughlan	279	12.1	−7.7
UKIP	Elizabeth Hazell	246	10.6	−4.6
Majority		877	37.9	+17.3
Turnout		2,312	24.3	−3.2
Liberal Democrats hold		Swing		

Willenhall South
Party	Candidate	Votes	%	±%
Labour	Sean Coughlan	960	43.2	−3.2
Conservative	Sandeep Sohal	696	31.3	+9.8
Liberal Democrats	Nadia Fazal	439	19.7	−8.5
Democratic Labour	Stephanie Peart	129	5.8	+1.8
Majority		264	11.9	−6.3
Turnout		2,224	20.7	−4.5
Labour hold		Swing		
