= Robin Hodgson, Baron Hodgson of Astley Abbotts =

British Conservative Party politician

The Right Honourable The Lord Hodgson of Astley Abbotts CBE
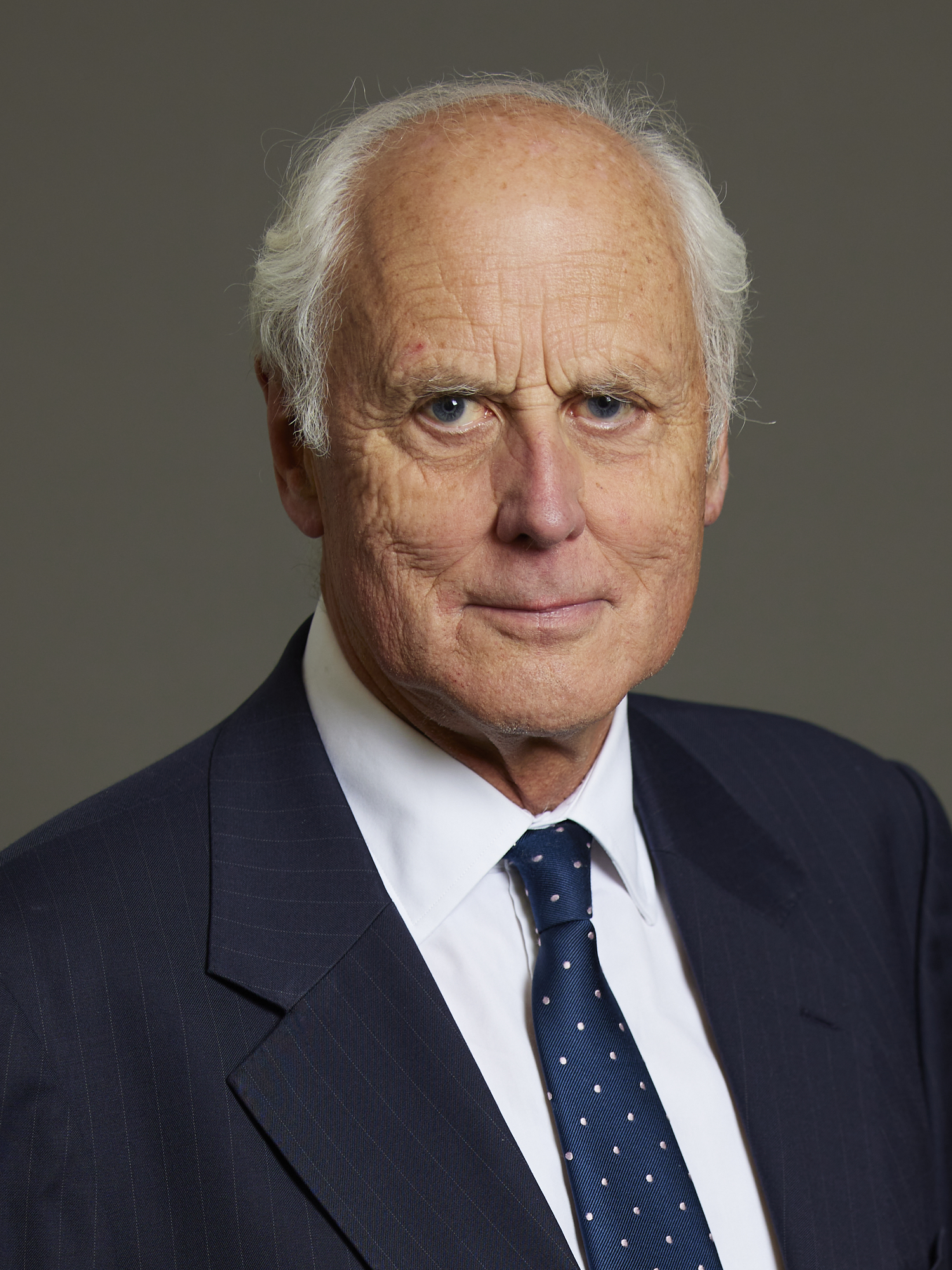
- Official portrait, 2023

Member of Parliament for Walsall North
- In office 4 November 1976 – 7 April 1979
- Preceded by: John Stonehouse
- Succeeded by: David Winnick

Member of the House of Lords
- Lord Temporal
- Life peerage 7 June 2000 – 12 December 2025

Personal details
- Born: 25 April 1942 (age 84) Leamington Spa, Warwickshire, England
- Party: Conservative
- Spouse: The Baroness Hodgson of Abinger
- Education: University of Oxford

Robin Granville Hodgson, Baron Hodgson of Astley Abbotts CBE (born 25 April 1942) is a British Conservative Party politician and life peer.

== Early life and education ==
Hodgson was born in 1942 in Leamington Spa. He was educated at the independent, fee-paying Shrewsbury School. He graduated from St Peter's College at the University of Oxford in 1964 and attained an MBA from the Wharton School of Finance in 1969.

== Political career ==
Hodgson ran as a Conservative in both the February and October 1974 general elections, in which he unsuccessfully contested the strongly Labour seat of Walsall North. However, in a 1976 by-election caused by incumbent John Stonehouse's imprisonment, Hodgson managed to overturn the large Labour majority to become the seat's Member of Parliament.

However, at the 1979 general election, Hodgson could not hold the seat against the Labour candidate, David Winnick, despite achieving an 11% swing for the Conservatives. The seat was then held by Labour until 2017, when it was won back by the Conservatives' Eddie Hughes.

In 1981, he was selected as the candidate for the safe Conservative seat of Stratford-upon-Avon, but resigned his candidature in 1982 for undisclosed personal reasons, and never returned to the Commons. He was awarded a CBE in the 1992 New Year's Honours. Hodgson served as Chairman of the National Union of Conservative Associations from 1996 until 1998, and as Chairman of the National Conservative Convention from 1998 until 2000.

He was created a life peer, as Baron Hodgson of Astley Abbotts, of Nash in the County of Shropshire, on 7 June 2000. In November 2011, Hodgson was appointed by David Cameron's government to perform a wholesale review of the Charities Act 2006 and Charities Act 2011, which was published in 2012. He is an ambassador for the volunteering network, REACH.

In May 2021 Hodgson co-authored an essay entitled "Population Growth, Immigration, and 'the Levelling Up' Agenda" with Lord Horam, for inclusion in Common Sense: Conservative Thinking for a Post-Liberal Age published by the Common Sense Group, an informal group of Conservative MPs.

== Business career ==
Hodgson has more than 40 years' experience in the private equity, securities and investment banking industries. He co-founded the private equity and investment banking specialist group Granville in 1979, and spearheaded its growth as chief executive and then chairman. Lord Hodgson played a role in developing the new regulatory structure of the City, including 10 years as a director of the Securities and Futures Authority. He is the co-founder and Chairman of Nova Capital. Lord Hodgson holds a number of other non-executive directorships, is an active private investor and is Chairman of Nova's Investment Committee. He has also at various times been director of Staffordshire Building Society and Marstons plc, the pub chain.

== Philanthropy ==
Hodgson has been a Trustee of St Peter's College, Oxford since 2000, and currently serves as the President of the St Peter's College Foundation.

== Personal life ==
In 1982, Hodgson married Fiona Ferelith Allom, who was created Baroness Hodgson of Abinger in 2013.

Parliament of the United Kingdom
Preceded by John Stonehouse	Member of Parliament for Walsall North; 1976–1979	Succeeded by David Winnick
Party political offices
Preceded by	Chairman of the National Union of Conservative and Unionist Associations; 1996–1998	Succeeded by Himself as Chairman of the National Conservative Convention
Preceded by Himself as Chairman of the National Union of Conservative and Unionist Associations	Chairman of the National Conservative Convention; 1998–2000	Succeeded by John Taylor
Orders of precedence in the United Kingdom
Preceded by The Lord Jordan	Gentlemen; Baron Hodgson of Astley Abbotts	Followed by The Lord Morgan
