= Thompson baronets of Reculver (1963) =

The Thompson Baronetcy, of Reculver in the County of Kent, was created in the Baronetage of the United Kingdom on 28 January 1963 for the Conservative politician Richard Thompson. He held several junior ministerial positions, notably as Under-Secretary of State for Commonwealth Relations. As of 2026 the title is held by his son, the second Baronet, who succeeded in 1999.

== Thompson baronets, of Reculver (1963) ==
- Sir Richard Hilton Marler Thompson, 1st Baronet (1912–1999)
- Sir Nicholas Annesley Marler Thompson, 2nd Baronet (born 1947)

The heir apparent to the baronetcy is Simon William Thompson (born 1985), eldest son of the 2nd Baronet.

Coat of arms of Thompson baronets of Reculver
Crest A demi-figure representing a Moorish prince proper wreathed about the temples with a torse argent and azure vested of a tunic paly argent and azure fringed and garnished or at his back supported by a guige gules baldrickwise across the right dexter shoulder a quiver azure replenished with arrows argent flighted or from the dexter hand a martlet rising azure and in the other a bow palewise stringed gules. Escutcheon Azure a bend argent between two ship's wheels or. Inescutcheon of pretence paly of six argent and azure over all a hand gules. Motto Sapiens qui prospicit, Wise is he who looks ahead
