= Manual labour =

Physical work done by people

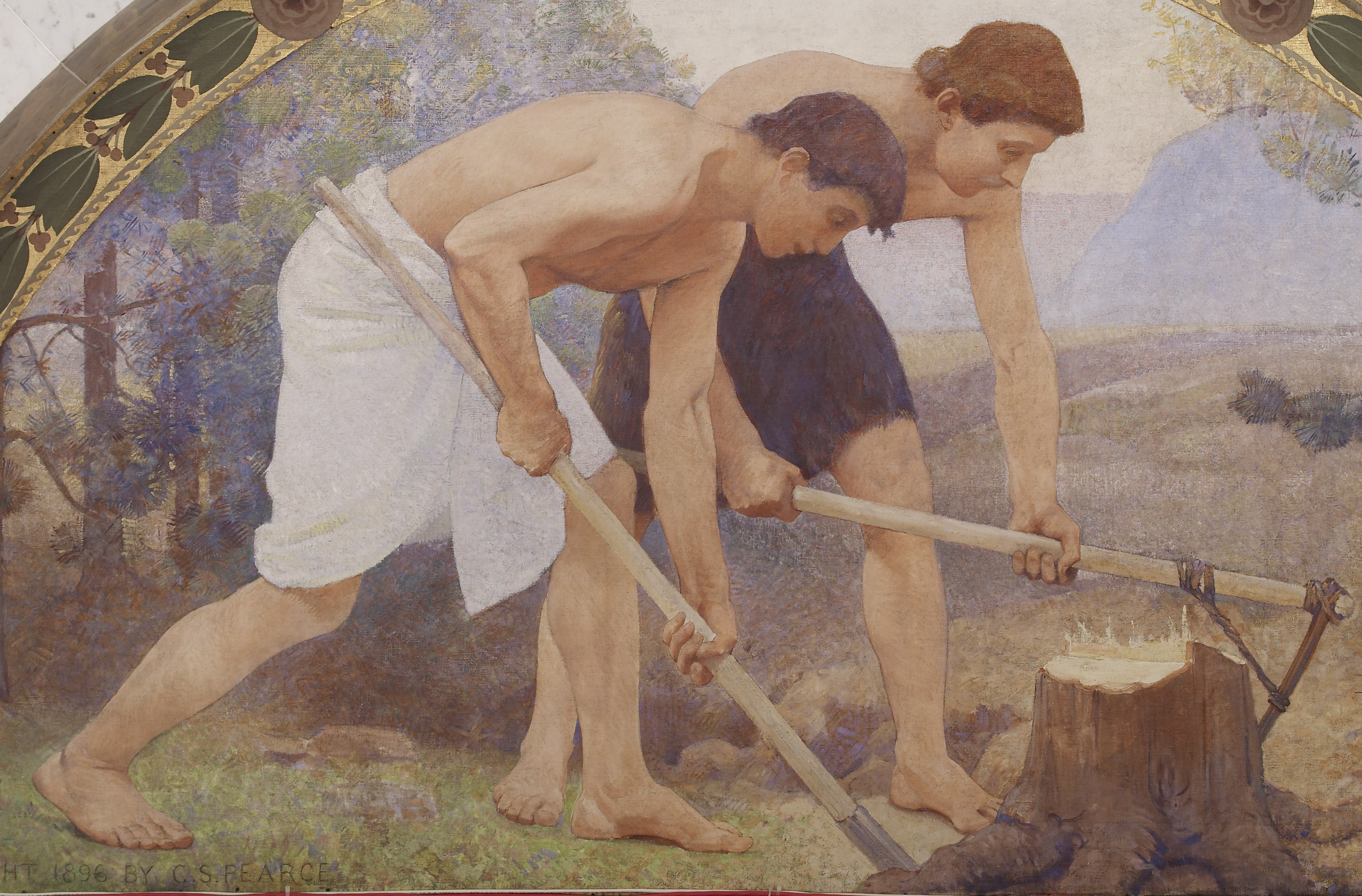
Detail from Labor by Charles Sprague Pearce (1896)

Manual labour (in Commonwealth English, manual labor in American English) or manual work is physical work done by humans, in contrast to labour by machines and working animals. It is most literally work done with the hands (the word manual coming from the Latin word for hand) and, by figurative extension, it is work done with the muscular strength of the human body. For most of human prehistory and history, manual labour and its close cousin, animal labour, have been the primary ways that physical work has been accomplished.

== Economic perspectives on manual labour ==
There are diverse viewpoints regarding the definition of manual labour, and the progression from manual labour to more complex forms can be ambiguous. Authors such as Karl Marx characterize it as simple labour, controversially proposing that all labour can be categorized as such. However, Ludwig von Mises argues that this is an oversimplification, highlighting it as a reason many socialist economic policies face challenges, particularly concerning the economic calculation problem. On the other hand, Paul Cockshott and Allin Cottrell advocate for considering all labour as simple labour, emphasizing the importance of accounting for training in more complex forms of labour. This complexity extends to determining what constitutes unskilled labour, as it raises questions about the nature of labour performed by students when training for specific professions. Ultimately, definitions of manual labour are shaped by economic and political interests, as all societies depend on some form of manual labour for their functioning.

Economic competition often results in businesses trying to buy labour at the lowest possible cost (for example, through offshoring or by employing foreign workers) or to obviate it entirely (through mechanisation and automation).

== Automation of manual labour ==
Mechanisation and automation, which reduce the need for human and animal labour in production, have existed for centuries, but it was only starting in the 18th and 19th centuries that they began to significantly expand and to change human culture. To be implemented, they require that sufficient technology exist and that its capital costs be justified by the amount of future wages that they will obviate. Semi-automation is an alternative to worker displacement that combines human labour, automation, and computerisation to leverage the advantages of both man and machine.

== Relationship between manual labour and class discrimination ==
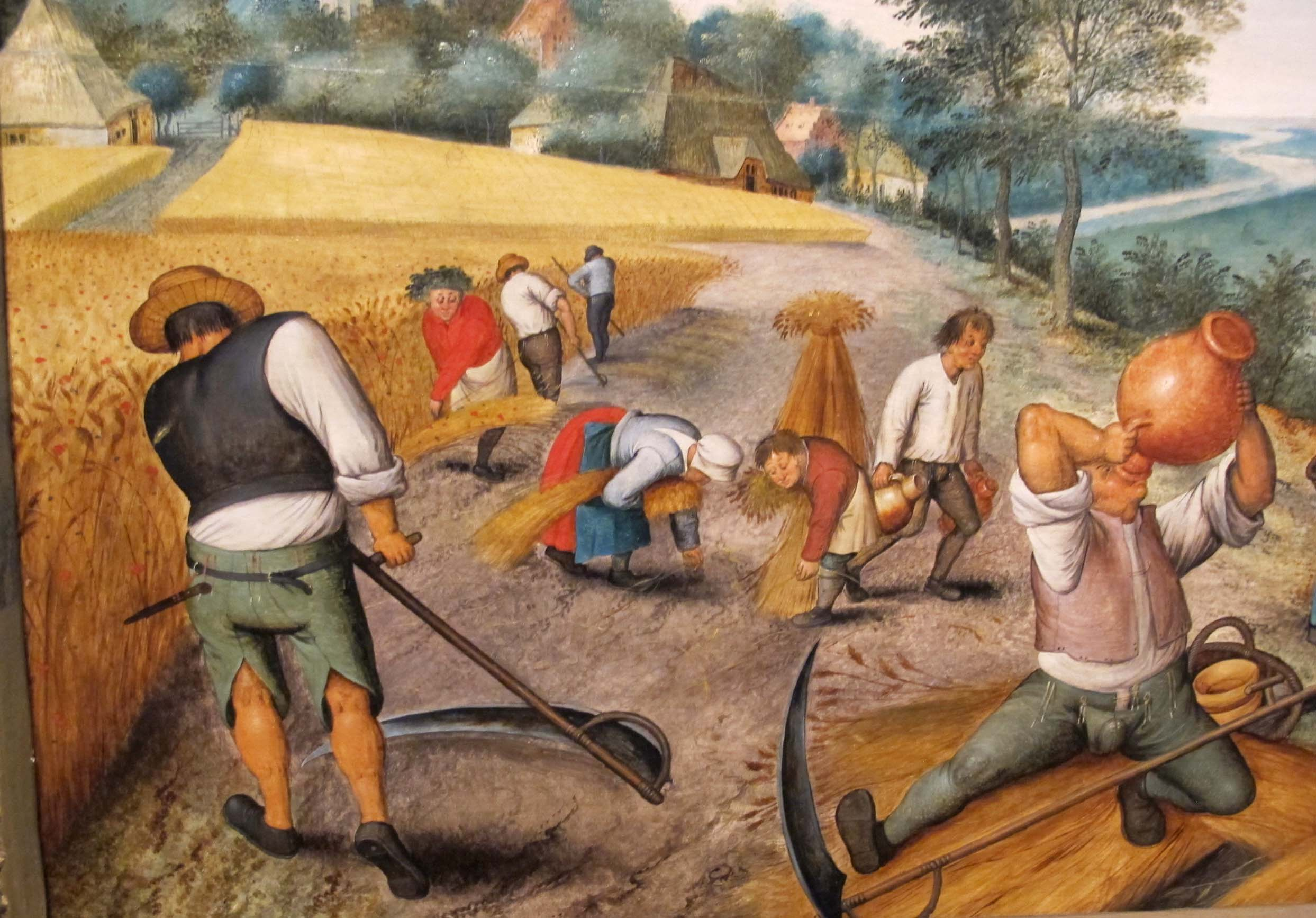
Peasants harvesting crops, by Flemish artist Pieter Brueghel, 17th century

Throughout human prehistory and history, wherever social class systems have developed, the social status of manual labourers has, more often than not, been low, as most physical tasks were done by peasants, serfs, slaves, indentured servants, wage slaves, or domestic servants. For example, legal scholar L. Ali Khan analyses how the Greeks, Hindus, English, and Americans all created sophisticated social structures to outsource manual labour to distinct classes, castes, ethnicities, or races.

Although nearly any work can potentially have skill and intelligence applied to it, many jobs that mostly comprise manual labour—such as fruit and vegetable picking, manual materials handling (for example, shelf stocking), manual digging, or manual assembly of parts—often may be done successfully (if not masterfully) by unskilled or semiskilled workers. For these reasons, there is a partial but significant correlation between manual labour and unskilled or semiskilled workers. Based on economic and social conflict of interest, people may often distort that partial correlation into an exaggeration that equates manual labour with lack of skill; with lack of any potential to apply skill (to an important task) or to develop skill (in a worker); and with low social class. Throughout human existence the latter has involved a spectrum of variants, from slavery (with stigmatisation of the slaves as 'subhuman'), to caste or caste-like systems, to subtler forms of inequality.

== See also ==
- Construction worker
- Critique of work
- Day labor
- Elbow grease
- Industrialisation
- Manual labor college
- Proletariat
- Refusal of work
- Roughneck
- Shadow work
- The Idler (1993)
- The South African Wine Initiative

== Bibliography ==
- Ford, Henry; Crowther, Samuel (1922), My Life and Work, Garden City, New York, USA: Garden City Publishing Company, Inc. Various republications, including ISBN 9781406500189. Original is public domain in U.S. Also available at Google Books.
- Khan, Ali (2006-10-12) [2001], "The dignity of manual labor", Columbia Human Rights Law Review, Social Science Research Network, SSRN 936890.
- Taylor, Frederick Winslow (1911), The Principles of Scientific Management, New York, NY, USA and London, UK: Harper & Brothers, LCCN 11010339, OCLC 233134 Also available from Project Gutenberg.
- Marx, Capital: A Critique of Political Economy, Volume 1, Penguin Group, p. 1152, ISBN 0140445684
- Cockshott, Towards a New Socialism, Bertrand Russell Press, p. 209, ISBN 0851245455
- Mises (2009), Socialism, Liberty Fund, p. 569, ISBN 978-1933550510
