= John Stonehouse =

British politician and alleged spy (1925–1988)

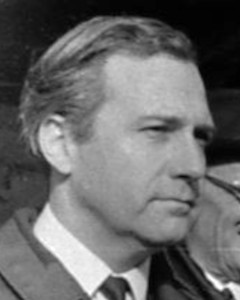
- Stonehouse in 1967

Minister of Posts and Telecommunications
- In office 1 October 1969 – 19 June 1970
- Prime Minister: Harold Wilson
- Preceded by: Position established
- Succeeded by: Christopher Chataway

Postmaster General
- In office 1 July 1968 – 1 October 1969
- Prime Minister: Harold Wilson
- Preceded by: Roy Mason
- Succeeded by: Position abolished; (Chairman, Post Office)

Member of Parliament for Walsall North
- In office 28 February 1974 – 27 August 1976
- Preceded by: William Wells
- Succeeded by: Robin Hodgson

Member of Parliament for Wednesbury
- In office 28 February 1957 – 8 February 1974
- Preceded by: Stanley Evans
- Succeeded by: Constituency abolished

Personal details
- Born: John Thomson Stonehouse; 28 July 1925 Southampton, Hampshire, England
- Died: 14 April 1988 (aged 62) Totton, Hampshire, England
- Party: Labour Co-op (1941–1976); English National (1976); SDP (1981–1988); Liberal Democrats (1988)
- Spouses: Barbara Smith (m. 1948; div. 1978); Sheila Buckley (m. 1981)
- Children: 4
- Education: London School of Economics

John Thomson Stonehouse (28 July 1925 – 14 April 1988) was a British Labour and Co-operative Party politician, businessman and minister who was a member of the Cabinet under Prime Minister Harold Wilson. He is remembered for his unsuccessful attempt at faking his own death in 1974. It is also alleged that Stonehouse had been an agent for Czechoslovak military intelligence.

== Early life and education ==
John Thomson Stonehouse was born on 28 July 1925 in Southampton, the second son and youngest of four children of Post Office engineer and later dockyard engine-fitter William Mitchell Stonehouse, and Rosina Marie (née Taylor). His father was local secretary of his trade union; Stonehouse joined the Labour Party at the age of sixteen. His mother, a former scullery maid, was the sixth female mayor of Southampton and a councillor on Southampton City Council from 1936 to 1970.

Stonehouse was educated at Taunton's School (now Richard Taunton Sixth Form College), Southampton, and served as a Royal Air Force pilot from 1944 until 1946. He then attended the London School of Economics (LSE), where he read for a BSc (Econ.) degree. During his time at the LSE, he was chairman of both the chess club and the Labour society. The political scientist Bernard Crick, who was a contemporary of Stonehouse at university, recalled that his then nickname was 'Lord John', and that "his conversation was openly and restlessly about how best to get a parliamentary seat."

== Political career ==
Stonehouse stood unsuccessfully in Norwood at the 1949 London County Council election. He was first elected as the Labour Co-operative Member of Parliament (MP) for Wednesbury in Staffordshire in a 1957 by-election, having contested Twickenham in 1950 and Burton in 1951.

In February 1959, Stonehouse travelled to the Federation of Rhodesia and Nyasaland on a fact-finding tour in which he condemned the white minority government of Southern Rhodesia (now Zimbabwe). Speaking to the Southern Rhodesia African National Congress, he encouraged indigenous Rhodesians to stand up for their rights and said they had the support of the British Labour Party. Stonehouse was promptly deported from Southern Rhodesia and banned from returning a year later.

Stonehouse served as a junior minister of aviation, where he was involved in the British Overseas Airways Corporation's order of Boeing 707 aircraft from the United States, against his own recommendation that they should buy the Super Vickers VC10, a British-made aircraft. This led to accusations by Stonehouse against colleagues about the reasons for the decision. In March 1968, Stonehouse negotiated an agreement providing a framework for the long-term development of technological co-operation between Britain and Czechoslovakia providing for the exchange of specialists and information, facilities for study and research in technology, and such other forms of industrial co-operation which might be agreed.

Stonehouse's rise continued while in the Colonial Office, and in 1967 he became Minister for Technology under Wilson. He later served as Postmaster General, where his greatest contribution to the postal system was the introduction of first and second-class postage in 1968, often called the two-tier post, which was met with a full day of debate on the floor of Parliament after a bungled marketing campaign. The debates over Stonehouse's leadership were followed shortly after by the abolition of the office of Postmaster General by the Post Office Act 1969. As Minister of Posts and Telecommunications in 1970, Stonehouse oversaw the controversial jamming of the offshore radio station Radio North Sea International. When Labour was defeated at the 1970 general election, he was not appointed to the Shadow Cabinet.

When the Wednesbury constituency was abolished in 1974, Stonehouse stood for and was elected to the nearby Walsall North constituency in the February general election. With Labour a minority government, another election was called in September, and Stonehouse was re-elected with an increased majority of nearly 16,000 in the October election, just six weeks before his disappearance. Stonehouse's last Parliamentary contribution before his disappearance was at Prime Minister's Questions on 14 November 1974, a few days before leaving for Miami, Florida.

== Spy allegations ==
Stonehouse allegedly began spying for Czechoslovakia in 1962. In a meeting with Harold Wilson in 1969, Stonehouse was informed of assertions that he was a Czechoslovak secret service agent; the informant was a defector from the Czechoslovak secret service, who had been debriefed by the US security services. At that time, Stonehouse successfully defended himself. In 2009, the spy allegation was substantiated in the official history of MI5, The Defence of the Realm (2009) by Cambridge historian Christopher Andrew. In December 2010, it was revealed that Margaret Thatcher had agreed to cover up revelations that Stonehouse had been a Czechoslovak spy in 1980, as there was insufficient evidence to bring him to trial. Until the 2012 exposure of Ray Mawby, briefly a member of a Conservative government, Stonehouse was the only Minister known to have been an agent for the former Eastern bloc.

== Business interests ==
Having lost his ministerial salary in 1970, Stonehouse set up various companies in an attempt to supplement his salary as an MP. By 1974 most of these companies were facing financial trouble, and Stonehouse had resorted to deceptive creative accounting. Aware that the Department of Trade and Industry was looking at his affairs, Stonehouse decided that his best choice would be to flee the country. Secret government documents, declassified in 2005, indicate that Stonehouse spent months rehearsing his new identity as 'Joseph Markham', the deceased husband of a constituent.

== Disappearance ==
Stonehouse maintained the pretence of normality until he faked his death on 20 November 1974, leaving a pile of clothes on a beach in Miami to make it appear that he had suffered a fatal misadventure while swimming. Stonehouse was presumed dead, and obituaries were published in British newspapers despite the fact that no corpse had been found. In reality, Stonehouse was en route to Australia, some 9,000 miles (14,000 km) away, hoping to set up a new life with his mistress and secretary, Sheila Buckley.

Using false identities, Stonehouse set about transferring large sums of money between banks as a further means of covering his tracks. Under the name of 'Clive Mildoon', he deposited A$21,500 in cash at the Bank of New Zealand. The teller who handled the money later spotted 'Mildoon' at the Bank of New South Wales. Inquiries led the teller to learn that the money was in the name of 'Joseph Markham', and he informed the local police. Stonehouse visited Copenhagen with Buckley around this time and returned to Australia unaware that he was now under surveillance. The Australian police initially suspected him of being Lord Lucan, who had disappeared a fortnight before Stonehouse, following the murder of his children's nanny. They contacted Scotland Yard, requesting pictures of both Lucan and Stonehouse. On his arrest, the police instructed Stonehouse to pull down his trousers in an attempt to establish whether or not he was Lucan, who had a 6-inch (150 mm) scar on the inside of his right thigh.

=== Arrest and aftermath ===
Stonehouse was arrested in Melbourne on 24 December 1974. He applied for resignation while still in Australia, but ultimately failed to sign the papers. On 17 July 1975, Stonehouse was extradited to the UK, escorted by Scotland Yard officers. He was remanded in Brixton Prison until August 1975 when he was released on bail. Stonehouse continued to serve as an MP; on 20 October 1975 he made a personal statement to the House of Commons in which he claimed to have been suffering dissociative personality disorder, his first Parliamentary oration since his disappearance almost a year earlier:

The explanation for the extraordinary and bizarre conduct in the second half of last year is found in the progressions towards the complete mental breakdown which I suffered. This breakdown was analysed by an eminent psychiatrist in Australia and was described by him as psychiatric suicide. It took the form of the repudiation of the life of Stonehouse because that life had become absolutely intolerable to him. A new parallel personality took over—separate and apart from the original man, who was resented and despised by the parallel personality for the ugly humbug and sham of the recent years of his public life. The parallel personality was uncluttered by the awesome tensions and stresses suffered by the original man, and he felt, as an ordinary person, a tremendous relief in not carrying the load of anguish which had burdened the public figure.
The collapse and destruction of the original man came about because his idealism in his political life had been utterly frustrated and finally destroyed by the pattern of events, beyond his control, which had finally overwhelmed him.

Despite this remarkable claim to be of unsound mind, the Speaker, Selwyn Lloyd, failed to invoke Section 137 of the Mental Health Act 1959.

Although unhappy with the situation, the Labour Party did not expel Stonehouse; ostensibly as their parliamentary majority was very narrow. On 4 April 1976 Stonehouse attended a St George's Day festival hosted by the English National Party; he later confirmed he had joined the party, making Labour a minority government.

Stonehouse conducted his own defence on twenty-one charges of fraud, theft, forgery, conspiracy to defraud, causing a false police investigation and wasting police time. His trial lasted 68 days. On 6 August 1976, Stonehouse was convicted and sentenced to seven years in prison for fraud, and received a criminal bankruptcy order. He agreed to resign as a Privy Counsellor on 17 August 1976, becoming one of only three people to resign from the Privy Council in the 20th century. Stonehouse tendered his resignation via the Chiltern Hundreds route from the House of Commons on 27 August 1976. The subsequent by-election was won by Robin Hodgson, a Conservative. In October 1976, Stonehouse was declared bankrupt.

Stonehouse was imprisoned in HM Prison Wormwood Scrubs. On 30 June 1977, the House of Lords refused his appeal against five of the charges of which he was convicted. While he was in prison, Stonehouse complained that the prison workshop where he worked played a pop music radio station. He made acquaintance with Moors murderer Ian Brady, and the pair played chess together until Brady was transferred elsewhere. When his health deteriorated, Stonehouse was moved to HM Prison Blundeston in Suffolk.

== Health problems ==
On 14 August 1979, Stonehouse was released early because of good behaviour and because he had suffered three heart attacks; he had the first on 18 April 1977, a second one four days later, and a massive heart attack on 13 August 1978. On 6 September 1978, Stonehouse suffered a coronary ischemia attack which required him to spend three days in hospital. He underwent open heart surgery on 7 November 1978 which lasted for six hours.

== After release ==
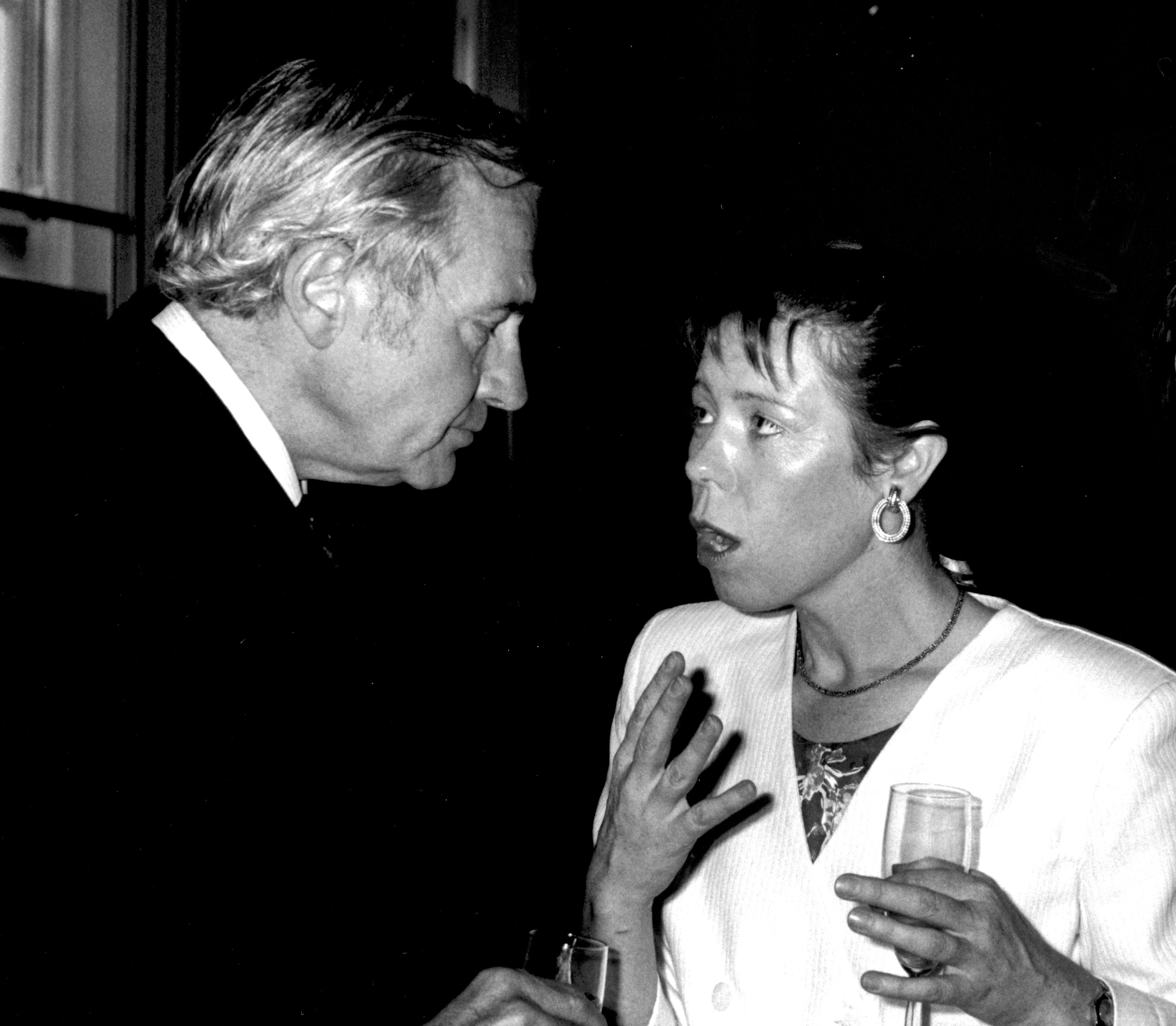
At a party for After Dark in 1987

From January 1980, Stonehouse was a volunteer fundraiser for the East London-based charity, Community Links. He joined the Social Democratic Party (SDP), which later amalgamated with the Liberal Party to become the Liberal Democrats. In June 1980, he was discharged from bankruptcy.

Stonehouse wrote four novels and made numerous television and radio appearances during the rest of his life, mostly in connection with discussing his disappearance. In June 1986 he appeared on TVS's Regrets programme and in December that year on the BBC Radio 4 interview programme In The Psychiatrist's Chair with Anthony Clare.

== Personal life ==
Stonehouse married Barbara Joan Smith in 1948; the marriage produced three children. After their divorce in 1978, Stonehouse married his mistress, Sheila Elizabeth Buckley (née Black), in Hampshire on 31 January 1981; the marriage produced one child.

Stonehouse's daughter Julia published an account of her father's life in 2021 titled John Stonehouse, My Father: The True Story of the Runaway MP; it was released almost simultaneously with a book called Stonehouse: Cabinet Minister, Fraudster, Spy, by criminal defence solicitor Julian Hayes. Hayes is Stonehouse's great-nephew through his father Michael Hayes, who was the MP's nephew and his lawyer. Julia has an eponymous website in which she questions the veracity of other books and broadcasts about her father.

== Death ==
On 25 March 1988 in Birmingham, Stonehouse collapsed on set while filming an edition of Central Weekend, a programme about missing people. He was given emergency medical treatment at the studio and an ambulance was called. He was diagnosed as having suffered a minor heart attack and was kept in the city's general hospital overnight. Just under three weeks later, early on 14 April, he suffered a massive heart attack at his house at Dales Way in Totton, Hampshire. Stonehouse had moved there six months earlier, having lived in London since his release from prison. His last address there was 20 Shirland Mews. This time Stonehouse could not be saved, and he died in hospital at 2:30 a.m. at age 62.

Stonehouse was cremated in Bassett Green, Southampton, on 22 April 1988. The former MP Bruce Douglas-Mann paid tribute. In 1989, his fourth novel was published posthumously.

== Television series ==
The British ITV series Stonehouse, a dramatisation of Stonehouse's story, was first broadcast from 2 to 4 January 2023. The series starred Matthew Macfadyen and Keeley Hawes and was directed by Jon S. Baird from a script by John Preston.

== Books by John Stonehouse ==
=== Non-fiction ===
- Prohibited Immigrant (Bodley Head, 1960)
  Stonehouse's account of his 1959 African tour, which culminated in his deportation from Southern Rhodesia.
- Death of an Idealist (W. H. Allen, 1975)
- My Trial (Wyndham, 1976)

=== Fiction ===
- Ralph (Jonathan Cape, 1982)
- The Baring Fault (Calder, 1986)
- Oil on the Rift (Robert Hale, 1987)
- Who Sold Australia? (Robert Hale, 1989)

== See also ==
- The Fall and Rise of Reginald Perrin

Parliament of the United Kingdom
Preceded by Stanley Evans	Member of Parliament for Wednesbury; 1957 – 1974	Constituency abolished
Preceded by William Wells	Member of Parliament for Walsall North; 1974–1976	Succeeded by Robin Hodgson
Political offices
Preceded by Roy Mason	Postmaster General; 1968–1969	Position abolished
