= 2006 Walsall Metropolitan Borough Council election =

2006 UK local government election

Map of the results of the 2006 Walsall council election. Conservatives in blue, Labour in red, Liberal Democrats in yellow and independent in grey.

The 2006 Walsall Metropolitan Borough Council election took place on 4 May 2006 to elect members of Walsall Metropolitan Borough Council in the West Midlands, England. One third of the council was up for election and the Conservative Party stayed in overall control of the council.

After the election, the composition of the council was:

- Conservative 34
- Labour 19
- Liberal Democrat 6
- Independent 1

== Election result ==
The results saw the Conservatives retain control of the council with 34 councillors, but they lost 2 seats to Labour who moved to 19 seats. The Liberal Democrats remained on 6 seats and there remained one independent councillor.

Walsall local election result 2006
Party	Seats	Gains	Losses	Net gain/loss	Seats %	Votes %	Votes	+/−
Conservative	10	0	2	-2	50.0	39.3	25,796	-1.9%
Labour	7	2	0	+2	35.0	27.2	17,896	-3.6%
Liberal Democrats	2	0	0	0	10.0	14.1	9,292	+0.8%
Independent	1	0	0	0	5.0	3.3	2,176	-1.2%
BNP	0	0	0	0	0	7.5	4,911	+4.7%
UKIP	0	0	0	0	0	4.5	2,956	-1.0%
Democratic Labour	0	0	0	0	0	2.9	1,891	+1.1%
Respect	0	0	0	0	0	1.0	670	+1.0%
Green	0	0	0	0	0	0.2	116	+0.2%

== Ward results ==
Aldridge Central and South
Party	Candidate	Votes	%	±%
Conservative	John O'Hare	2,367	54.6	
BNP	Andrew Aspbury	749	17.3	
Labour	Steven King	555	12.8	
Liberal Democrats	Linda Dickins	437	10.1	
Independent	Anthony Lenton	229	5.3	
Majority		1,618	37.3	
Turnout		4,337	40.9	−2.9
Conservative hold		Swing		

Aldridge North and Walsall North
Party	Candidate	Votes	%	±%
Conservative	Anthony Harris	1,645	46.0	
BNP	Michael McCormack	671	18.8	
Labour	Ian Pearson	540	15.1	
UKIP	Graham Eardley	375	10.5	
Liberal Democrats	Mark Greveson	347	9.7	
Majority		974	27.2	
Turnout		3,578	34.8	−0.6
Conservative hold		Swing		

Bentley and Darlaston North
Party	Candidate	Votes	%	±%
Labour	Ayshea Johnson	1,131	46.0	
Conservative	Daniel Lloyd	719	29.3	
Liberal Democrats	Christopher Pearce	448	18.2	
Democratic Labour	Alan Paddock	159	6.5	
Majority		412	16.7	
Turnout		2,457	27.3	−4.7
Labour hold		Swing		

Birchills Leamore
Party	Candidate	Votes	%	±%
Labour	Jonathan Phillips	1,016	41.2	
Conservative	Carol Rose	946	38.3	
Liberal Democrats	Wendy Evans	327	13.2	
Democratic Labour	Alan Davies	180	7.3	
Majority		70	2.8	
Turnout		2,469	26.9	+0.9
Labour gain from Conservative		Swing		

Blakenall
Party	Candidate	Votes	%	±%
Labour	Patricia Young	1,098	45.9	
Democratic Labour	Peter Smith	824	34.4	
Conservative	Doris Silvester	222	9.3	
Liberal Democrats	Richard Cullum	133	5.6	
Green	Karl Macnaughton	116	4.8	
Majority		274	11.5	
Turnout		2,393	27.8	+1.1
Labour hold		Swing		

Bloxwich East
Party	Candidate	Votes	%	±%
Labour	Kathleen Phillips	1,065	40.6	
Conservative	Alan Venables	1,052	40.1	
UKIP	Alan Sheath	290	11.1	
Democratic Labour	Terence Durrant	110	4.2	
Liberal Democrats	Murli Sinha	106	4.0	
Majority		13	0.5	
Turnout		2,623	30.8	−2.7
Labour hold		Swing		

Bloxwich West
Party	Candidate	Votes	%	±%
Conservative	Louise Harrison	1,224	37.6	
Labour	Frederick Westley	995	30.6	
BNP	John Salvage	719	22.1	
Liberal Democrats	Christine Cockayne	214	6.6	
Democratic Labour	David Church	102	3.1	
Majority		229	7.0	
Turnout		3,254	33.7	+0.6
Conservative hold		Swing		

Brownhills
Party	Candidate	Votes	%	±%
Conservative	David Turner	1,060	35.0	
Labour	Richard Worrall	1,038	34.3	
BNP	William Locke	623	20.6	
UKIP	Kenneth Davies	227	7.5	
Democratic Labour	Geoffrey Macmanomy	77	2.5	
Majority		22	0.7	
Turnout		3,025	31.5	−3.1
Conservative hold		Swing		

Darlaston South
Party	Candidate	Votes	%	±%
Independent	Paul Bott	1,459	53.6	
Labour	Stephen Docherty	876	32.2	
Conservative	Hilda Derry	388	14.2	
Majority		583	21.4	
Turnout		2,723	30.0	+2.0
Independent hold		Swing		

Paddock
Party	Candidate	Votes	%	±%
Conservative	Zahid Ali	2,007	44.7	
Labour	Khizar Hussain	1,104	24.6	
UKIP	Derek Bennett	696	15.5	
Liberal Democrats	Martin Barker	678	15.1	
Majority		903	20.1	
Turnout		4,485	47.2	−4.8
Conservative hold		Swing		

Palfrey
Party	Candidate	Votes	%	±%
Labour	Mohammad Nazir	1,694	40.7	
Conservative	Mohammad Munir	1,597	38.4	
Liberal Democrats	Mohammad Miah	469	11.3	
Respect	Nadia Fazal	401	9.6	
Majority		97	2.3	
Turnout		4,161	41.6	−4.2
Labour gain from Conservative		Swing		

Pelsall
Party	Candidate	Votes	%	±%
Conservative	Clive Ault	1,692	44.6	
Liberal Democrats	Simeon Mayou	1,025	27.0	
BNP	Lisa DeSouza	708	18.7	
Labour	Aftab Nawaz	285	7.5	
Democratic Labour	Derek Roddy	86	2.3	
Majority		667	17.6	
Turnout		3,796	42.2	−1.2
Conservative hold		Swing		

Pheasey Park Farm
Party	Candidate	Votes	%	±%
Conservative	Christopher Towe	1,798	53.1	
Labour	Douglas James	714	21.1	
UKIP	Edmund Newman	630	18.6	
Liberal Democrats	Louise Shires	247	7.3	
Majority		1,084	32.0	
Turnout		3,389	41.1	−1.6
Conservative hold		Swing		

Pleck
Party	Candidate	Votes	%	±%
Labour	Harbans Sarohi	1,324	36.2	
Conservative	Mushtaq Ahmed	1,202	32.8	
Liberal Democrats	Norman Matthews	555	15.2	
Independent	Mark Dabbs	488	13.3	
Democratic Labour	Brian Powell	92	2.5	
Majority		122	3.4	
Turnout		3,661	38.4	−0.8
Labour hold		Swing		

Rushall Shelfield
Party	Candidate	Votes	%	±%
Conservative	Rachel Walker	1,366	43.1	
BNP	Julie Locke	815	25.7	
Labour	Robert Thomas	633	20.0	
Liberal Democrats	Ian Dickins	279	8.8	
Democratic Labour	Louise Bradburn	77	2.4	
Majority		551	17.4	
Turnout		3,170	35.0	−0.8
Conservative hold		Swing		

Short Heath
Party	Candidate	Votes	%	±%
Liberal Democrats	John Cook	1,184	41.9	
BNP	Malcolm Moore	626	22.1	
Conservative	Chad Pitt	611	21.6	
Labour	Gareth Walker	406	14.4	
Majority		558	19.8	
Turnout		2,827	31.7	+1.0
Liberal Democrats hold		Swing		

St. Matthews
Party	Candidate	Votes	%	±%
Conservative	Haqnawaz Khan	1,493	37.3	
Labour	Mohammed Yaqoob	1,115	27.9	
Liberal Democrats	Daniel Barker	897	22.4	
Respect	Martin Lynch	269	6.7	
UKIP	Mohammed Yaqub	225	5.6	
Majority		378	9.4	
Turnout		3,999	42.7	−3.9
Conservative hold		Swing		

Streetly
Party	Candidate	Votes	%	±%
Conservative	Edmund Hughes	3,185	80.4	
Labour	Thomas Charlton	775	19.6	
Majority		2,410	60.8	
Turnout		3,960	38.8	−1.9
Conservative hold		Swing		

Willenhall North
Party	Candidate	Votes	%	±%
Liberal Democrats	Valerie Woodruff	1,297	48.1	
UKIP	Elizabeth Hazell	513	19.0	
Conservative	Steven Turner	458	17.0	
Labour	Robert Matthews	429	15.9	
Majority		784	29.1	
Turnout		2,697	28.7	−0.7
Liberal Democrats hold		Swing		

Willenhall South
Party	Candidate	Votes	%	±%
Labour	Angela Underhill	1,103	40.9	
Conservative	Jason Pitt	764	28.3	
Liberal Democrats	Peter Hughes	649	24.0	
Democratic Labour	Stephanie Peart	184	6.8	
Majority		339	12.6	
Turnout		2,700	26.5	−1.5
Labour hold		Swing		
