= William Wells (1908–1990) =

English barrister and Labour Party politician (1908–1990)

William Thomas Wells QC

Member of Parliament for Walsall North
- In office 26 May 1955 – 8 February 1974
- Preceded by: Constituency established
- Succeeded by: John Stonehouse

Member of Parliament for Walsall
- In office 5 July 1945 – 6 May 1955
- Preceded by: George Schuster
- Succeeded by: Constituency Abolished

Personal details
- Born: 10 August 1908 England
- Died: 3 January 1990 (aged 81)
- Party: Labour (until 1981); SDP (from 1981)
- Education: Lancing College
- Alma mater: Balliol College, Oxford
- Occupation: Barrister, Politician
- Profession: Lawyer
- Awards: Queen's Counsel (1955)

Military service
- Branch/service: General Staff, War Office
- Rank: Major
- Unit: British Army
- Battles/wars: World War II

William Thomas Wells QC (10 August 1908 – 3 January 1990) was an English barrister and Labour Party politician.

Wells was from an upper-class background and went to the Public School Lancing College near Brighton, and to Balliol College, Oxford. He was called to the Bar by the Middle Temple in 1932.

During World War II, Wells served in the army on the General Staff to the War Office, being promoted to the rank of Major. He was elected as the Member of Parliament (MP) for Walsall in the 1945 general election.

Although never taking Ministerial office, Wells's experience of the law was used on departmental committees. He was a member of the Lord Chancellor's Committee on the Practice and Procedure of the Supreme Court which sat from 1947 to 1953, of the Magistrates' Courts Rule Committee from 1954, and of the Wolfenden Committee on Prostitution and Homosexual Offences from 1954 to 1957.

Wells remained an active Barrister throughout his Parliamentary career and was made a Queen's Counsel in 1955. He was Deputy Chairman of Hertfordshire Quarter Sessions from 1961 to 1971, and in 1963 he became a Bencher of the Middle Temple. From 1965 to 1971 he was Recorder of King's Lynn, giving up the job when he became a Recorder of the Crown Court from 1972.

Moderate in politics, Wells supported British membership of the European Economic Community in 1971 against a three line whip. He retired at the end of the Parliament in 1974. From 1976 he was made a Chairman of Industrial Tribunals. He joined the Social Democratic Party (SDP) in 1981.

Parliament of the United Kingdom
Preceded by George Schuster	Member of Parliament for Walsall; 1945–1955	Constituency abolished
New constituency	Member of Parliament for Walsall North; 1955–Feb 1974	Succeeded by John Stonehouse
