= 1957 Wednesbury by-election =

UK parliamentary by-election

← 1955	28 February 1957	1959 →

Constituency of Wednesbury
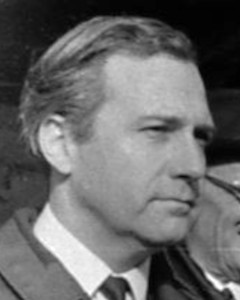

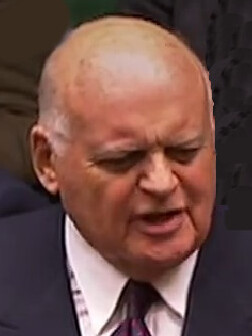
	First party	Second party	Third party
Candidate	John Stonehouse	Peter Tapsell	Michael Wade
Party	Labour	Conservative	Independent
Popular vote	22,235	9,999	3,529
Percentage	62.17%	27.96%	9.87
Swing	▲1.77%	▼11.64%
MP before election
Stanley Evans
Labour
Subsequent MP
John Stonehouse
Labour

The 1957 Wednesbury by-election was held on 28 February 1957 after the incumbent Labour MP, Stanley Evans, resigned from the House of Commons and the Labour Party after he had refused to vote against the Conservative government on the Suez Crisis. The Labour candidate, John Stonehouse, retained the seat with an increased majority.

== Background ==
In November 1956 there was a vote of confidence in the Conservative government caused by the Suez Crisis. Evans abstained on the vote, being the only Labour MP not to follow the party whip. Although he was not disciplined by the Parliamentary Labour Party, the Wednesbury Divisional Labour Party were highly critical of him. On 17 November the Divisional Party unanimously passed a resolution calling on him to resign, and on 20 November Evans announced his resignation from both the House of Commons and the Labour Party. He formally resigned his seat by taking the office of Crown Steward and Bailiff of the three Chiltern Hundreds of Stoke, Desborough and Burnham on 26 November.

== Candidates ==
The resulting by-election was held on 28 February 1957.

The Labour Party chose John Stonehouse, a lecturer who had previously unsuccessfully contested two general elections at Twickenham and Burton-upon-Trent.

The Conservatives chose Peter Tapsell, a former member of the Conservative Research Department.

An independent candidate, Wolverhampton solicitor and businessman Michael John Wade (1928-86) announced his candidacy hours before the close of nominations on 18 February, and went on to fight the election ‘on the cost of living issue alone’. Wade said, ‘freeze wages, and prices will come down’. Asked about American policy on Suez, he said, ‘tell them there are still some British bulldogs about’. In 1958, Wade saw national news coverage as the director of a Wolverhampton ballroom which operated a colour bar. In July 1959, he was convicted of business fraud and sentenced to four years' imprisonment.

== Result ==
Stonehouse held the seat for Labour with an increased majority.

Wednesbury by-election 1957
Party	Candidate	Votes	%	±%
Labour	John Stonehouse	22,235	62.17	+1.77
Conservative	Peter Tapsell	9,999	27.96	−11.64
Independent	Michael John Wade	3,529	9.87	New
Majority		12,236	34.21	+13.51
Turnout		35,763		
Labour hold		Swing		
