= Sir Richard Thompson, 1st Baronet =

British politician

Sir Richard Thompson
- Thompson in 1959

Parliamentary Secretary to the Ministry of Works
- In office 28 October 1960 – 16 July 1962
- Prime Minister: Harold Macmillan
- Preceded by: Harmar Nicholls
- Succeeded by: Richard Sharples

Under-Secretary of State for Commonwealth Relations
- In office 22 October 1959 – 28 October 1960
- Prime Minister: Harold Macmillan
- Preceded by: Cuthbert Alport
- Succeeded by: Andrew Cavendish

Parliamentary Secretary to the Ministry of Health
- In office 17 September 1957 – 22 October 1959
- Prime Minister: Harold Macmillan
- Preceded by: John Vaughan-Morgan
- Succeeded by: Edith Pitt

Vice-Chamberlain of the Household
- In office 8 April 1956 – 17 September 1957
- Prime Minister: Anthony Eden; Harold Macmillan
- Preceded by: Henry Studholme
- Succeeded by: Peter Legh

Lord Commissioner of the Treasury
- In office 6 April 1955 – 8 April 1956
- Prime Minister: Anthony Eden
- Preceded by: New Appointment
- Succeeded by: Harwood Harrison

Member of Parliament for Croydon South Croydon West (1950–55)
- In office 18 June 1970 – 28 February 1974
- Preceded by: David Winnick
- Succeeded by: John Moore (Croydon Central)
- In office 23 February 1950 – 31 March 1966
- Preceded by: David Rees-Williams
- Succeeded by: David Winnick

Personal details
- Born: Richard Hilton Marler Thompson; 5 October 1912 Chesterfield, Derbyshire, UK
- Died: 15 July 1999 (aged 86)
- Party: Conservative
- Spouse: Christabel de Vere Annesley
- Parents: Richard Thompson (father); Kathleen Marler (mother)
- Education: Malvern College

Sir Richard Hilton Marler Thompson, 1st Baronet (5 October 1912 – 15 July 1999) was a British Conservative politician.

== Early life and career ==
Thompson was born in Chesterfield, Derbyshire, the son of Richard South Thompson (1868–1952) and Kathleen Hilda née Marler (d. 1916). He was educated at Malvern College and in India, Burma and Sri Lanka

He worked in Calcutta and the Far East in business.

== Military career ==
In World War II, he served in the Royal Navy as an ordinary seaman and became a lieutenant-commander in the Royal Navy Volunteer Reserve. He was serving on HMS Hermione in 1942 when the ship was sunk whilst part of the Malta convoys. He became a director of two publishing companies and was a trustee of the British Museum.

== Political career ==
Thompson was elected as Member of Parliament for Croydon West in 1950, defeating Labour MP David Rees-Williams, then for the new Croydon South seat in 1955. He joined the Whips' Office as a junior whip in 1952, then as Lord Commissioner of the Treasury in 1954 and Vice-Chamberlain of the Household in 1956. He was Parliamentary Secretary to the Ministry of Health 1957–59, Under-Secretary of State for Commonwealth Relations 1959-60 and Parliamentary Secretary to the Ministry of Works 1960–62.

In 1963 he was created a Baronet, of Reculver in the County of Kent.

Thompson lost his seat to Labour's David Winnick in 1966, but regained it in 1970. He retired at the February 1974 general election.

== Personal life ==
Thompson married Anne Christabel de Vere Annesley on 9 August 1939 in Blean Kent, the daughter of Philip de Vere Annesley (1879–1949) and Christabel Charlotte née Tomson (1887–1955).

Sir Richard died on 15 July 1999 in Ashford, Kent, Anne Christabel died in February 2003 in Kingston upon Thames.

Sir Richard was succeeded by his only son Nicholas Annesley Marler Thompson, born 19 March 1947 at Bridge, Kent, who inherited the baronetcy in 1999. Sir Nicholas is chairman of the executive committee of The Standing Council of the Baronetage. He married Venetia Catherine Heathcote (b. 22 April 1951) the daughter of John Horace Broke Heathcote (28 December 1910 – 30 May 2003) and Dorelle Geraldine née Rice (13 March 1913 – 11 May 2007) on 10 December 1982 at St Margaret's, Westminster. They have four children:

- Simon William Thompson (b. 10 June 1985)
- Charles Frederick Thompson (b. 25 November 1986)
- David Jonathan Thompson (b. 20 April 1990)
- Emma Louise Thompson (b. 24 July 1991)

== Arms ==
Coat of arms of Sir Richard Thompson, 1st Baronet
| Crest A demi-figure representing a Moorish Prince Proper wreathed about the temples with a torse Argent and Azure vested of a tunic paly Argent and Azure fringed and garnished Or at his back supported by a guige Gules baldrickwise across the right dexter shoulder a quiver Azure replenished with arrows Argent flighted Or from the dexter hand a martlet rising Azure and in the other a bow palewise stringed Gules. Escutcheon Azure a bend Argent between two ship's wheels Or. Inescutcheon of pretence paly of six Argent and Azure over all a hand Gules. Motto Sapiens Qui Prospicit |

Parliament of the United Kingdom
| New constituency | Member of Parliament for Croydon West; 1950–1955 | Constituency abolished |
| New constituency | Member of Parliament for Croydon South; 1955–1966 | Succeeded by David Winnick |
| Preceded by David Winnick | Member of Parliament for Croydon South; 1970–1974 | Constituency abolished |
Baronetage of the United Kingdom
| New creation | Baronet (of Reculver); 1963–1999 | Succeeded by Nicholas Annesley Marler Thompson |
