= Fiona Hodgson, Baroness Hodgson of Abinger =

The Right Honourable The Baroness Hodgson of Abinger CBE
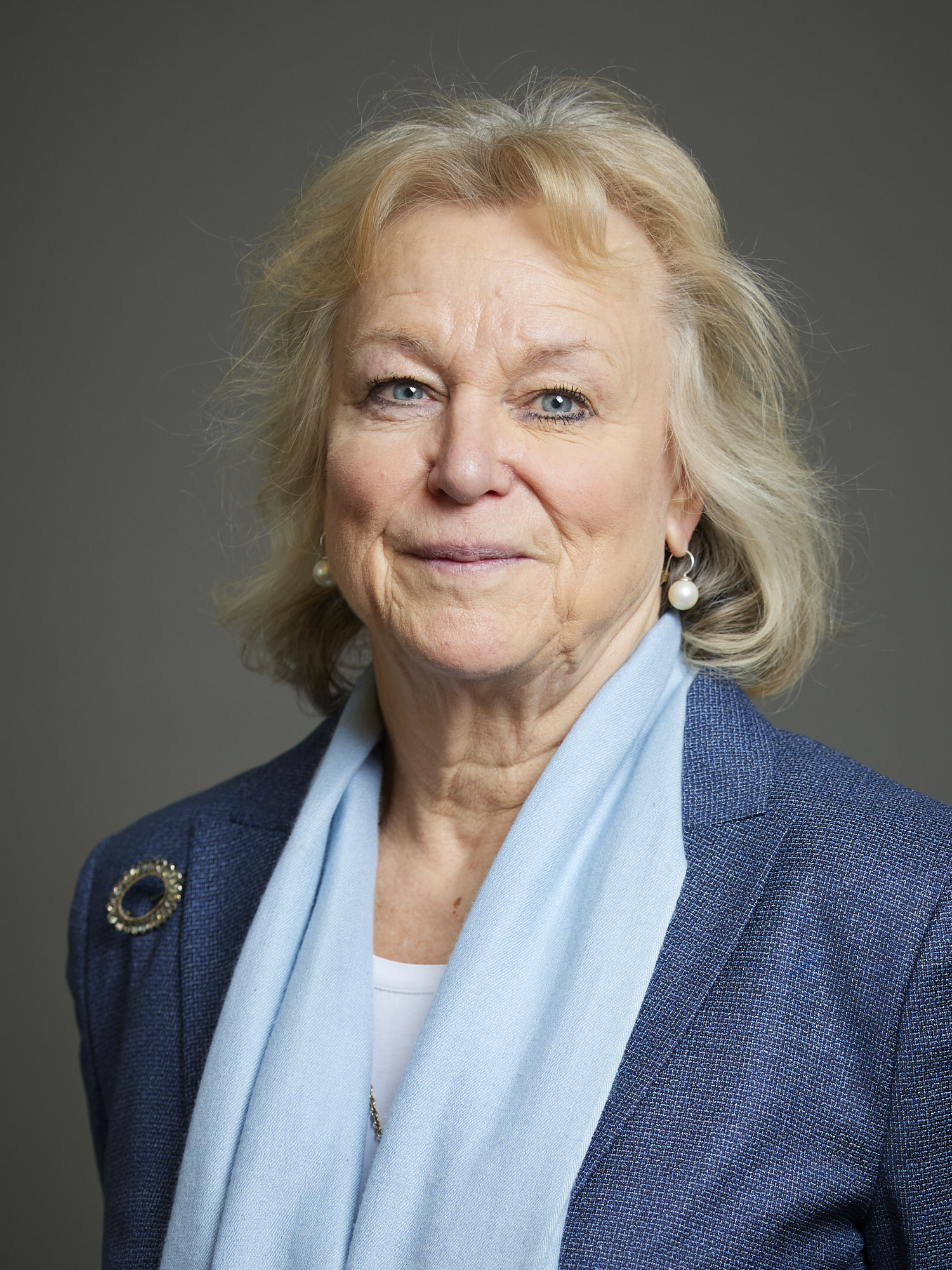
- Hodgson in 2023

Member of the House of Lords
- Lord Temporal
- Life peerage 16 September 2013

Personal details
- Born: 7 November 1954 (age 72) Surrey, UK
- Party: Conservative
- Spouse: The Lord Hodgson of Astley Abbotts
- Education: Queen Anne's School, Caversham, Berkshire; Guildford High School, Surrey

Fiona Ferelith Hodgson, Baroness Hodgson of Abinger CBE (née Allom) is a Conservative politician and life peer.

== Biography ==
She was educated at senior level at Queen Anne's School, Caversham, Berkshire and Guildford High School, Surrey. She was granted a life peerage to join the House of Lords in September 2013.

Appointed a Commander of the Order of the British Empire (CBE) in the 2012 New Year Honours having expertise in quality review and audit in the provision of private healthcare services. the peerage was created on 16 September 2013 taking the title Baroness Hodgson of Abinger, of Abinger in the County of Surrey.

She is an Honorary Vice President of the Conservative Women's Organisation and Chair of the Governance Board of the Independent [Healthcare] Sector Complaints Adjudication Service, part of the Association of Independent Healthcare Organisations.

In 1982 Hodgson married Robin Granville Hodgson, who was created a life peer in 2000.
