= Current members of the United States Congress =

For a list of current members of the United States Congress, see:

- List of current United States senators
- List of current United States representatives
