= Walsall North =

Parliamentary constituency in the United Kingdom, 1955-2024

Coordinates: 52.61°N 2.01°W

- Former borough constituency for the House of Commons
- Boundary of Walsall North in West Midlands

- Location of West Midlands within England
- County: West Midlands
- Electorate: 65,468 (December 2010)
- Major settlements: Willenhall, Bloxwich and Walsall (part)

1955–2024
- Seats: One
- Created from: Walsall
- Replaced by: Walsall and Bloxwich

Walsall North was a constituency (Note: A borough constituency (for the purposes of election expenses and type of returning officer)) in the West Midlands represented in the House of Commons of the UK Parliament, created in 1955. (Note: As with all constituencies, the constituency elects one Member of Parliament (MP) by the first past the post system of election at least every five years.)

The local electorate returned a Labour MP in the constituency's first seventeen general elections; in the following election Eddie Hughes became its second Conservative MP, following an earlier by-election win by his party in 1976. The constituency consisted of green-buffered urban areas across one half of the formerly metalworking- and manufacturing-centred town of Walsall, and the main other settlement within its boundaries, Bloxwich.

Further to the completion of the 2023 Periodic Review of Westminster constituencies, the seat was abolished. Subject to major boundary changes, it was reformed as Walsall and Bloxwich, first contested at the 2024 general election.

== Constituency profile ==
The constituency was in the heart of an area traditionally focused on manufacturing which retained many mechanical and engineering jobs in its economy.

Workless claimants, registered jobseekers, were in November 2012 significantly higher than the national average of 3.8%, at 8.0% of the population based on a statistical compilation by The Guardian, not the highest in the region (which was Birmingham Ladywood at 11.1%) but also significantly higher than the average for the region, 4.7%.

== Boundaries ==
Map of boundaries 1983-2024

Walsall North was one of three constituencies covering the Metropolitan Borough of Walsall. The others were Walsall South and Aldridge-Brownhills.

1955–1964: The County Borough of Walsall wards of Birchills, Blakenall, Bloxwich, Hatherton, and Leamore, and the Urban District of Brownhills.

1964–1974: The County Borough of Walsall wards of Birchills, Blakenall, Bloxwich East, Bloxwich West, Hatherton, and Leamore, and the Urban District of Brownhills.

1974–1983: The County Borough of Walsall wards of Bentley, Birchills, Blakenall, Bloxwich East, Bloxwich West, Leamore, Willenhall North and Willenhall South.

1983–2024: The Metropolitan Borough of Walsall wards of Birchills Leamore, Blakenall, Bloxwich East, Bloxwich West, Short Heath, Willenhall North, and Willenhall South.

== History ==
Results between 1955 and 1979

The seat was created in 1955 from part of Walsall. Its first Member of Parliament was W.T. Wells of the Labour Party, who had been the MP for Walsall. In 1974, he was succeeded by controversial Labour MP John Stonehouse, who was appointed Postmaster General and became infamous for faking his own death, being later jailed for fraud. After resigning from the party in April 1976, he was invited to join the English National Party, becoming their first (and only) MP, before being forced to resign as an MP in August 1976. The ensuing by-election was won by Robin Hodgson, a Conservative.

Results since 1979

Labour regained the seat in 1979; their candidate was the former Croydon South MP David Winnick, who represented the constituency until 2017. Aside from a marginal majority in 1987 of 3.7%, Winnick's wins from and including 1979 ranged between 7.3% and 29% (the latter twice) until 2010. He fended off a strong challenge from Conservative Helyn Clack, who he beat by 2.7% of the vote in 2010. Going into the 2015 general election, Walsall North was 13th on the list of Conservative target seats. Winnick increased his majority to 1,937 — 5.2% of the vote. The 2015 result gave the seat the 22nd-smallest majority of Labour's 232 seats by percentage of majority.

Other parties since 1979

Conservative candidates finished runner-up in each election from and including 1979, winning in 2017.

The UKIP swing of +17.2% in 2015, coming the year before the UK's EU membership referendum, was higher than the national average of 9.5%. The Liberal Democrat, TUSC and Green Party candidates of 2015 won less than 5% of the vote, so lost their deposits.

The Liberal Democrats managed to produce their best result since the seat's 1955 creation (counting their two predecessor parties) in 1983, when Liberal A. Bentley polled 20.7% of the vote. In 2005 and 2010, the BNP saved their deposit by polling more than 5% of the vote. The last time this percentage had been reached by a candidate in Walsall North in other than the top three parties had been 1976.

=== Abolition ===
Further to the completion of the 2023 Periodic Review of Westminster constituencies, the seat was abolished prior to the 2024 general election, with its contents distributed three ways:

- The majority, comprising the Birchills Leamore, Blakenall and two Bloxwich wards were combined with the majority of the disappearing Walsall South seat, which includes Walsall town centre, to form the new constituency of Walsall and Bloxwich
- Short Heath and Willenhall North wards to Wolverhampton North East
- Willenhall South ward to Wolverhampton South East

== Members of Parliament ==
Election	Member	Party
1955	William Wells	Labour
Feb 1974	John Stonehouse	Labour Co-operative
1976	John Stonehouse	English Nationalist
1976 by-election	Robin Hodgson	Conservative
1979	David Winnick	Labour
2017	Eddie Hughes	Conservative

== Elections ==
=== Elections in the 2010s ===
General election 2019: Walsall North
Party	Candidate	Votes	%	±%
Conservative	Eddie Hughes	23,334	63.8	▲14.2
Labour	Gill Ogilvie	11,369	31.1	▼11.7
Liberal Democrats	Jennifer Gray	1,236	3.4	▲1.9
Green	Mark Wilson	617	1.7	New
Majority		11,965	32.7	▲25.9
Turnout		36,556	54.4	▼2.9
Conservative hold		Swing	▲13.0	

General election 2017: Walsall North
Party	Candidate	Votes	%	±%
Conservative	Eddie Hughes	18,919	49.6	▲15.8
Labour	David Winnick	16,318	42.8	▲3.8
UKIP	Elizabeth Hazell	2,295	6.0	▼16.0
Liberal Democrats	Isabelle Parasram	586	1.5	▼0.8
Majority		2,601	6.8	N/A
Turnout		38,118	57.3	▲2.3
Conservative gain from Labour		Swing	▲6.1	

General election 2015: Walsall North
Party	Candidate	Votes	%	±%
Labour	David Winnick	14,392	39.0	▲2.0
Conservative	Douglas Hansen-Luke	12,455	33.8	▼0.5
UKIP	Elizabeth Hazell	8,122	22.0	▲17.2
Liberal Democrats	Nigel Jones	840	2.3	▼10.8
TUSC	Peter Smith	545	1.5	▼0.8
Green	Mike Harrison	529	1.4	New
Majority		1,937	5.2	▲2.5
Turnout		36,883	55.0	▼0.5
Labour hold		Swing	▲1.3	

General election 2010: Walsall North
Party	Candidate	Votes	%	±%
Labour	David Winnick	13,385	37.0	▼10.8
Conservative	Helyn Clack	12,395	34.3	▲6.3
Liberal Democrats	Nadia Fazal	4,754	13.1	▲0.7
BNP	Christopher Woodall	2,930	8.1	▲2.1
UKIP	Elizabeth Hazell	1,737	4.8	▲1.3
Democratic Labour	Peter Smith	842	2.3	0.0
Christian	Babar Shakir	144	0.4	New
Majority		990	2.7	▼17.2
Turnout		36,187	55.5	▲3.3
Labour hold		Swing	▼9.0	

=== Elections in the 2000s ===
General election 2005: Walsall North
Party	Candidate	Votes	%	±%
Labour	David Winnick	15,990	47.8	▼10.3
Conservative	Ian Lucas	9,350	28.0	▼1.1
Liberal Democrats	Douglas Taylor	4,144	12.4	▲3.4
BNP	William Locke	1,992	6.0	New
UKIP	Anthony Lenton	1,182	3.5	▲1.0
Democratic Labour	Peter Smith	770	2.3	New
Majority		6,640	19.8	▼9.2
Turnout		33,428	52.8	▲3.8
Labour hold		Swing	▼4.6	

General election 2001: Walsall North
Party	Candidate	Votes	%	±%
Labour	David Winnick	18,779	58.1	▲1.5
Conservative	Melvin Pitt	9,388	29.1	▲1.5
Liberal Democrats	Michael Heap	2,923	9.0	▼0.4
UKIP	Jenny Mayo	812	2.5	New
Socialist Alliance	David Church	410	1.3	New
Majority		9,391	29.0	0.0
Turnout		32,312	49.0	▼15.1
Labour hold		Swing		

=== Elections in the 1990s ===
General election 1997: Walsall North
Party	Candidate	Votes	%	±%
Labour	David Winnick	24,517	56.6	▲9.9
Conservative	Michael Bird	11,929	27.6	▼11.8
Liberal Democrats	Tracy O'Brien	4,050	9.4	▼3.3
Referendum	Derek Bennett	1,430	3.3	New
Independent	Melvin Pitt	911	2.1	New
National Front	Alan Humphries	465	1.1	▼0.1
Majority		12,588	29.0	▲21.7
Turnout		43,302	64.1	▼10.9
Labour hold		Swing		

General election 1992: Walsall North
Party	Candidate	Votes	%	±%
Labour	David Winnick	24,387	46.7	▲4.1
Conservative	Robert Syms	20,563	39.4	▲0.4
Liberal Democrats	AR Powis	6,629	12.7	▼5.7
National Front	KA Reynolds	614	1.2	New
Majority		3,824	7.3	▲3.7
Turnout		52,193	75.0	▲1.2
Labour hold		Swing	▲1.9	

=== Elections in the 1980s ===
General election 1987: Walsall North
Party	Candidate	Votes	%	±%
Labour	David Winnick	21,458	42.6	+0.1
Conservative	Leah Hertz	19,668	39.0	+2.3
Liberal	Ian Shires	9,285	18.4	−2.3
Majority		1,790	3.6	−2.2
Turnout		50,411	73.8	+2.8
Labour hold		Swing		

General election 1983: Walsall North
Party	Candidate	Votes	%	±%
Labour	David Winnick	20,782	42.5	
Conservative	Nicholas Stephens	17,958	36.7	
Liberal	Arthur Bentley	10,141	20.7	
Majority		2,824	5.8	
Turnout		48,881	71.0	
Labour hold		Swing		

=== Elections in the 1970s ===
General election 1979: Walsall North
Party	Candidate	Votes	%	±%
Labour	David Winnick	26,913	50.9	−8.6
Conservative	Robin Hodgson	21,047	39.8	+13.7
Liberal	Arthur Bentley	3,778	7.1	−6.3
National Front	C Parker	1,098	2.1	N/A
Majority		5,866	11.1	N/A
Turnout		52,836	72.3	+5.7
Labour hold		Swing		

Walsall North by-election, 1976
Party	Candidate	Votes	%	±%
Conservative	Robin Hodgson	16,212	43.4	▲17.3
Labour	David Winnick	11,833	31.6	▼27.9
Independent	Sidney Wright	4,374	11.7	New
National Front	Joseph Parker	2,724	7.3	New
Liberal	Fran Oborski	1,212	3.2	▼13.2
Socialist Workers	James McCallum	574	1.5	New
National Party	Marian Powell	258	0.7	New
Ecology	Jonathan Tyler	181	0.5	New
Air, Road, Public Safety, White Resident	Bill Boaks	30	0.1	New
Majority		4,379	11.8	N/A
Turnout		37,398		
Conservative gain from Labour		Swing	+22.5	

General election October 1974: Walsall North
Party	Candidate	Votes	%	±%
Labour Co-op	John Stonehouse	28,340	59.5	−4.1
Conservative	Robin Hodgson	12,455	26.1	−8.7
Liberal	W Gill	6,337	13.4	New
Communist	J Richards	465	1.0	−0.6
Majority		15,885	33.4	+4.6
Turnout		47,597	66.6	−5.5
Labour Co-op hold		Swing		

General election February 1974: Walsall North
Party	Candidate	Votes	%	±%
Labour Co-op	John Stonehouse	32,458	63.6	
Conservative	Robin Hodgson	17,754	34.8	
Communist	J Richards	819	1.6	
Majority		14,704	28.8	
Turnout		51,031	72.1	
Labour Co-op hold		Swing		

General election 1970: Walsall North
Party	Candidate	Votes	%	±%
Labour	William Wells	27,543	57.1	−8.0
Conservative	A John Barnes	20,128	41.7	+6.8
Communist	Graham Stevenson	597	1.2	New
Majority		7,415	15.4	−14.8
Turnout		48,268	66.8	−4.1
Labour hold		Swing		

=== Elections in the 1960s ===
General election 1966: Walsall North
Party	Candidate	Votes	%	±%
Labour	William Wells	29,710	65.1	+3.7
Conservative	A John L Barnes	15,953	34.9	−3.7
Majority		13,757	30.2	+7.4
Turnout		45,663	70.9	−1.0
Labour hold		Swing		

General election 1964: Walsall North
Party	Candidate	Votes	%	±%
Labour	William Wells	27,842	61.4	+0.4
Conservative	A John L Barnes	17,518	38.6	−0.4
Majority		10,324	22.8	+0.8
Turnout		45,360	71.9	−4.8
Labour hold		Swing		

=== Elections in the 1950s ===
General election 1959: Walsall North
Party	Candidate	Votes	%	±%
Labour	William Wells	27,693	61.0	−1.5
Conservative	James G Ackers	17,741	39.0	+1.5
Majority		9,952	22.0	−3.0
Turnout		45,434	76.7	−0.3
Labour hold		Swing		

General election 1955: Walsall North
Party	Candidate	Votes	%	±%
Labour	William Wells	26,665	62.5	
National Liberal	Francis R Roberts	15,970	37.5	
Majority		10,695	25.0	
Turnout		42,635	77.0	
Labour win (new seat)				

== See also ==
- List of parliamentary constituencies in the West Midlands (county)
