= Association of Independent Healthcare Organisations =

The Association of Independent Healthcare Organisations was formed in April 2013 by a merger between the Private Hospitals Association and Independent Healthcare Advisory Services as a trade association for independent healthcare organisations.

The organisation has sections dealing with both Wales and Scotland and hosts the Independent Sector Complaints Adjudication Service. The Chief Executive is Fiona Booth. Fiona Hodgson, Baroness Hodgson of Abinger is Chair of the Governance Board of the Complaints Adjudication Service.

The association has been linked with Lynton Crosby because Crosby Textor Group, advised the group of businesses, then called H5, which became the Private Hospitals Association on healthcare after David Cameron took power in 2010. H5 consisted of General Healthcare Group, Spire Healthcare, HCA International, Nuffield Health and Ramsay Health Care UK).

The association acted to defend its members during the investigation by the Competition Commission in 2013 which ended in a decision that HCA must sell two of its hospitals in central London, and BMI Healthcare was to divest from seven of its hospitals, in order to improve competition in the private healthcare market.

Booth also responded to an article on "Patient safety in private hospitals - the known and the unknown risks" by Colin Leys published by the Centre for Health and the Public Interest. The report claimed the same requirements to report incidents do not apply to private providers as they do to the NHS, which makes it hard to monitor how safe or otherwise private services are. Information about clinical negligence claims against private providers is not publicly available, as it is in the NHS. She said "Just like NHS institutions, the Care Quality Commission regulates independent hospitals for quality and safety. Inspections of independent hospitals are no less rigorous than those of NHS institutions"

She made the same point when the Royal College of Surgeons called for a serious review of the private sector in the wake of the conviction of Ian Paterson. She said also that the association was "working with national bodies to look at ways in which the sector can be further involved in the collection of best data on clinical standards". The RCS were particularly concerned with safety standards and data transparency, where they said the private sector was behind the NHS.

In February 2020 only six of the NHS private patient units, of which there are more than 200, had signed up to the Independent Sector Complaints Adjudication Service, although most of the independent providers had.
