= Elbow grease =

English idiom to describe hard work

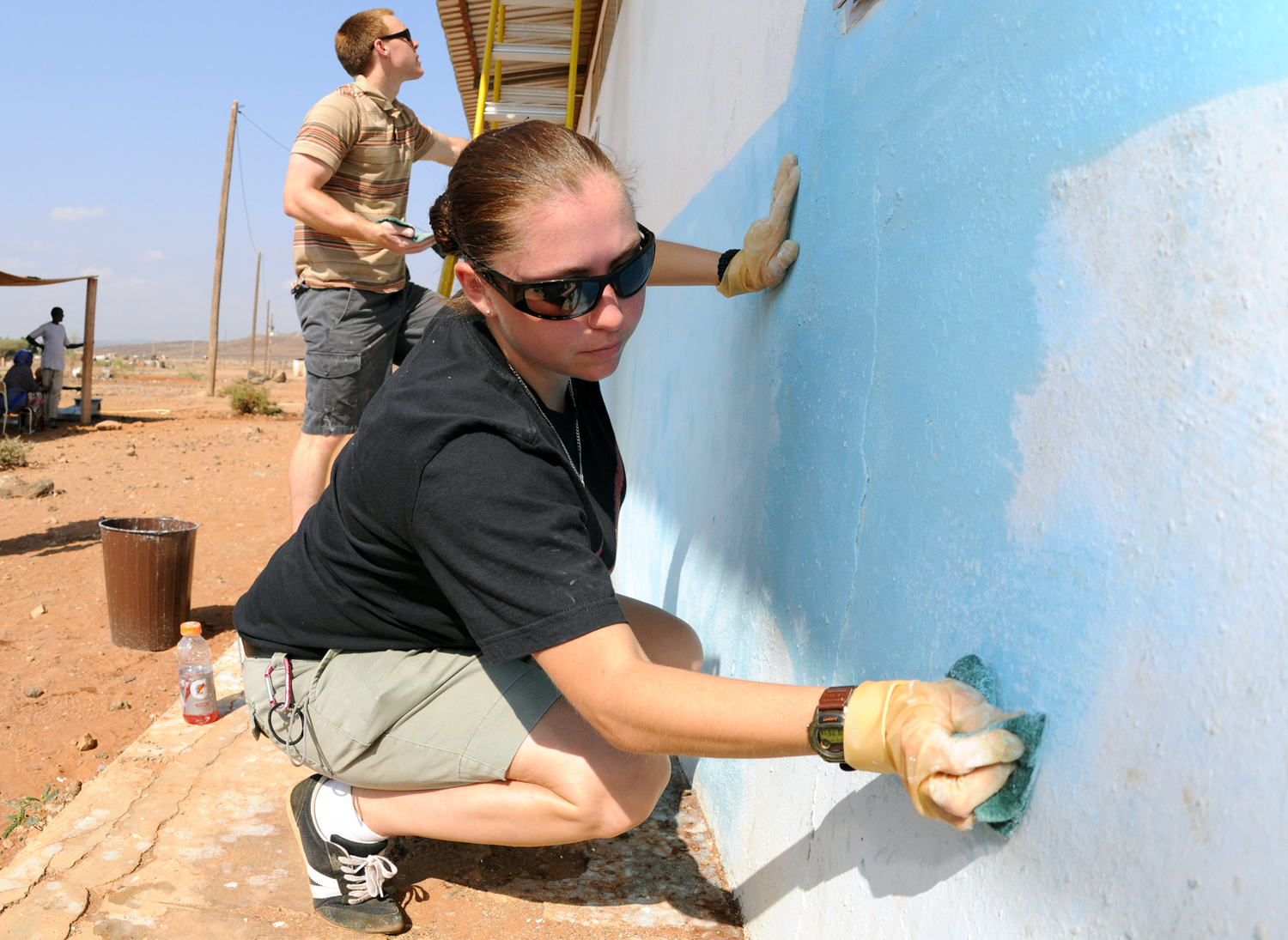
US Navy Petty Officer 2nd Class Sara Liming scrubs the walls of the Nagad School in Djibouti’s Atta Region on March 26, 2011.

Elbow grease is an idiom for manual labor and/or the process of working hard to accomplish an objective.

The earliest evidence of the phrase in print was in 1672. Andrew Marvell, an English metaphysical poet, used the words in a satirical book about English parliament. Marvell wrote: "Two or three brawny Fellows in a Corner, with mere Ink and Elbow-grease, do more Harm than an Hundred systematical Divines with their sweaty Preaching."

Further uses are attested in the 1670s. In 1699, the phrase appeared in the New Dictionary of the Canting Crew defined as "a derisory Term for Sweat".

== See also ==
- English-language idioms
- List of practical joke topics
