= David Winnick =

British politician (1933–2026)

Member of Parliament for Walsall North
- In office 3 May 1979 – 3 May 2017
- Preceded by: Robin Hodgson
- Succeeded by: Eddie Hughes

Member of Parliament for Croydon South
- In office 31 March 1966 – 29 May 1970
- Preceded by: Richard Thompson
- Succeeded by: Richard Thompson

Personal details
- Born: David Julian Winnick; 26 June 1933 Brighton, Sussex, England
- Died: 25 March 2026 (aged 92)
- Party: Labour
- Spouse: Bengisu Rona (m. 1968, divorced)
- Children: 1

David Julian Winnick (26 June 1933 – 25 March 2026) was a British Labour Party politician who served 42 years as a Member of Parliament (MP), for Walsall North between 1979 and 2017, he was also the MP for Croydon South from 1966 to 1970.

== Early life ==
Winnick was born into a British Jewish family, on 26 June 1933, in Brighton.

== Early career ==
Winnick was an advertising manager and a branch chairman of the Clerical and Administrative Workers Union. He was a councillor from 1959 on Willesden Borough Council, then on the London Borough of Brent.

== Parliamentary career ==
After unsuccessfully fighting Harwich in 1964, Winnick was elected in 1966 as the MP for Croydon South (now the area covered roughly by Croydon Central constituency), defeating incumbent Richard Thompson. He lost the seat to Thompson in 1970. After completing a diploma in social administration at the London School of Economics, he stood again unsuccessfully in Croydon Central in October 1974 and was returned for Walsall North in 1979.

Winnick was generally regarded as being on the left of the Labour Party and had a strong commitment to human rights. That commitment made him a strong voice in the House of Commons against both the Taliban and Saddam Hussein and he supported the 2003 invasion of Iraq.

He was a member of the British-Irish Parliamentary body from its formation in 1990, and British co-chair, 1997–2005.

On 9 November 2005, Winnick's amendment to a government bill on detention of terrorist suspects without trial, proposing that the maximum period of detention should be 28 days rather than 90, passed in the House of Commons by 323 votes to 290, shortly after the government's 90-day proposal was defeated by 322 to 291. This was Tony Blair's first defeat in the House of Commons on a whipped vote, after serving nearly nine years as Prime Minister.

In January 2009, he urged the Communities Minister to deplore the fact that Richard Williamson, a British-born bishop and Holocaust denier, had been brought back into the fold by the Vatican.

Winnick played a prominent role in the campaign to force the resignation of the Speaker of the House of Commons, Michael Martin. This followed controversy from May 2009 concerning MPs' disclosure of expenses.

At the 2010 general election, Walsall North was one of the most closely contested seats at the election, with Winnick being re-elected with a significantly reduced majority of 990 votes, compared to 6,640 votes at the previous election five years earlier. In 2015, however, Winnick gained a majority of 1,937, despite the Labour Party incurring a net loss of seats. In his victory speech, he criticised the way in which his Conservative opponent had conducted their election campaign.

In 2017 (again against the national trend) he was defeated by Conservative Party candidate Eddie Hughes by 2,601 votes.

== Personal life and death ==
Winnick married Bengisu Rona (having met her when a student in London, later working at SOAS University of London from the 1980s) on 23 September 1968, in Istanbul. They later divorced. Winnick died on 25 March 2026, aged 92.

Parliament of the United Kingdom
Preceded by Richard Thompson	Member of Parliament for Croydon South; 1966–1970	Succeeded by Richard Thompson
Preceded by Robin Hodgson	Member of Parliament for Walsall North; 1979–2017	Succeeded by Eddie Hughes
