= Democratic Labour Party (UK, 1998) =

- Leader: Brian Powell
- Officer: Peter Smith
- Founder: Dave Church
- Founded: 1998
- Dissolved: 2016
- Split from: Labour Party
- Headquarters: Walsall
- Ideology: Socialism; Decentralisation
- Political position: Left-wing

The Democratic Labour Party was a small British left-wing political party in Walsall, sometimes known as the Walsall Democratic Labour Party. It was founded as a breakaway from the Labour Party after left-wing members were expelled in the mid-1990s.

== Origins 1995–1999 ==
Dave Church (known as "Citizen Dave"), his deputy John Rothery, and others on the left of Walsall Labour Party had supported a policy of radical decentralisation of power since the early 1980s, but the right-wing of the party had held power as Metropolitan Borough of Walsall councillors, preventing the enactment of the policies. In May 1995, after three years during which the left-wing councillors were suspended from the party for 'operating their own caucus', the left gained control of the council. They sacked nine council department heads, proposing to replace them with 54 directly-elected neighbourhood councils. The spectre of the "Loony left" alarmed Labour Party central office, who suspended the district party that August. Church faced claims of 'intimidation tactics', and Church, Rothery and Brian Powell were expelled from the Labour Party by the National Executive Committee in November 1995 for running a "party within a party" called the Walsall Socialist Group. Eleven councillors in all broke away from the Labour Party.

The Democratic Labour Party was officially registered in 1999.

== Electoral history ==
None of the 10 Democratic Labour candidates in the 1998 local elections won a seat, losing four seats including that of the deputy leader John Rothery to Labour. Labour returned to overall control of the council, and Democratic Labour were left with six councillors. The party lost its remaining seats in the 1999 election, three to Labour and three to the Conservatives, and despite standing 15 candidates at the 2000 election did not win back any seats.

Joined by other local left-wingers, they helped set up their local Socialist Alliance, and stood as candidates under its banner in elections until it was disbanded. Dave Church stood for the Socialist Alliance in Walsall North in the 2001 general election, gaining 410 votes (1.3%).

== Return 2005–2016 ==
In the 2005 general election, Church stood for Democratic Labour, again in Walsall North, receiving 770 votes (2.3%).

In 2007, Pete Smith won a council seat on Walsall Council from Labour in the Blakenall ward. Smith also stood in Walsall North and gained 842 votes, 2.3% of the vote at the 2010 general election. He lost his council seat in 2011 but was re-elected in 2012 on an anti-cuts platform; the DLP then affiliated to the Trade Unionist and Socialist Coalition.

In 2016, the DLP effectively ceased to exist for a second time when Smith lost his council seat in the local elections.

== See also ==
- List of Labour Party breakaway parties (UK)
