= Thomas Telford University Technical College =

Thomas Telford UTC

Location
- Thomas Telford UTC, Springfield Campus, Cambridge Street; Wolverhampton, West Midlands, WV10 0JR; England
- 52°35′32″N 2°07′14″W

Information
- Type: University technical college
- Established: 2015
- Local authority: City of Wolverhampton Council
- Trust: Thomas Telford Multi-Academy Trust
- Department for Education URN: 140160 Tables
- Ofsted: Reports
- Chair of Governors: Kerrie Jones
- Principal: Avtar Gill
- Chief Executive: Sir Kevin Satchwell
- Gender: Mixed
- Age: 11 to 19
- Website: www.thomastelfordutc.com

Thomas Telford UTC (formerly West Midlands Construction UTC) is a coeducational 11-19s University Technical College (UTC) school located on the Springfield Campus in Wolverhampton, West Midlands, England. Established in 2015, the school is situated within the Grade II listed building of the restored former Springfield Brewery, which dates back to 1873. It became part of the Thomas Telford Multi-Academy Trust in 2019.

Thomas Telford UTC offers a variety of programs including GCSE, BTEC, A-Levels, and T-Levels, with a specialisation in construction and the application of IT in the Built Environment. The school receives sponsorship from construction companies in the region, which contributes to its focus on construction-related education. This support includes the provision of equipment, resources, as well as organising events, talks, training sessions, and placement opportunities for students.

The curriculum at Thomas Telford UTC is designed to provide a blend of theoretical knowledge and practical experience. In addition to academic studies, the school offers a mandatory Session 3 program called UTC Extra.

The Principal of Thomas Telford UTC is Avtar Gill, who previously held the position of Deputy Head at Sandwell Academy, another school within the Thomas Telford Multi-Academy Trust.

== History ==
In 2014, the University of Wolverhampton acquired the derelict 11.3-acre Grade II listed Springfield Brewery site, with the aim of establishing a construction and built environment super-campus within a two-year timeframe. The site at Springfield was designated to house the University of Wolverhampton School of Architecture and Built Environment, as well as the West Midlands Construction University Technical College (UTC). The University of Wolverhampton played a co-sponsoring role in the construction of the West Midlands Construction UTC, led by the Construction Industry Training Board (CITB), and had strong backing from the City of Wolverhampton Council and over 60 construction companies. In November 2016, the school opened its doors for the first time.

In 2019, the West Midlands Construction UTC underwent significant changes and became part of the Thomas Telford Multi-Academy Trust, joining other institutions like Madeley Academy, Sandwell Academy, Walsall Academy, and Redhill Primary Academy. In addition, the school was rebranded as Thomas Telford University Technical College (UTC) and changed its student age range from 14-19s to 11-19s. To accommodate the increase in students, the school embarked on a £12.6 million building extension project, increasing its capacity from 600 to 1,050 students. The first intake was for September 2020 and filled to full capacity by 2024.
