= Sneyd Comprehensive School =

School in Bloxwich, West Midlands, England

Coordinates: 52.62023°N 2.030067°W

Sneyd Comprehensive School was a secondary school located in Bloxwich, West Midlands, England. The building of the school started in 1978, to serve the western part of the town and the northern part of Willenhall, with students moving into the School at the start of the new academic year in September 1979.

The school was situated on Vernon Way in the shadow of the M6 motorway, and is just over the border from Willenhall. Sneyd Reservoir is adjacent to the former school site.

The Sneyd School Choir performed at the Royal Albert Hall, at an event called 'The Magic of Music', organised by the Opal Foundation. They were one of two school choirs to win that night, and have won the opportunity to represent Great Britain at the 2008 Choir Olympics in Graz, Austria

The school entered special measures in 2005, but managed to get out of these by 2006. In 2009, it was the joint lowest ranking secondary school in the Walsall borough with 27% of students achieving five or more GCSEs at grade C or above.

== Notable former pupils ==
- Lee Naylor, footballer who began his career at Wolverhampton Wanderers and last played for Derby County F.C.

== Closure ==
The school was closed in August 2011 due to continuously falling behind in exam results and Ofsted reports.

However a new specialist engineering university technical college (UTC) was established on the former school site straight after the closure. The Black Country UTC was a joint run project between Walsall College and Wolverhampton University which closed in August 2015. There was no automatic transfer of pupils from old to the new school.
