= William Dolman =

William Dolman may refer to:

- William Dolman (coroner) (fl. 1990s–2000s), British coroner
- Bill Dolman (1906–1964), English footballer

== See also ==
- Bill Doleman (born 1966), American television sports anchor
- William Doleman (1838–1918), Scottish amateur golfer
