= Bloxwich Academy =

Location
- Leamore Lane; Bloxwich, West Midlands, WS2 7NR; England
- 52.610115264640948°N 2.016633936288004°W

Information
- Type: Academy
- Motto: 'Be The Best You Can Be'
- Department for Education URN: 137274 Tables
- Ofsted: Reports
- Head Teacher: James Till
- Gender: Mixed
- Age: 3 to 19
- Enrolment: 1,326
- Houses: Brindley Watt Stephenson Telford
- Website: www.bloxwichacademy.co.uk

Bloxwich Academy is a mixed all-through school located in Bloxwich, West Midlands, England. The school serves the south-western side of Bloxwich which includes the areas of Beechdale and Leamore.

Frank F. Harrison School opened on the current school site in 1965, and expansion work took place in 1968 and again in 1971. It has had higher pupil numbers since September 1992, when it took in most of the pupils from the closing Forest Comprehensive School.

The current school was formed from the merger of Frank F. Harrison Engineering College and Hatherton Primary School. The merged academy was originally known as The Mirus Academy, but has since been renamed Bloxwich Academy. The school is sponsored by The Matrix Academy Trust.
