= Bloxwich =

Town in West Midlands, England

Coordinates: 52.614°N 2.004°W

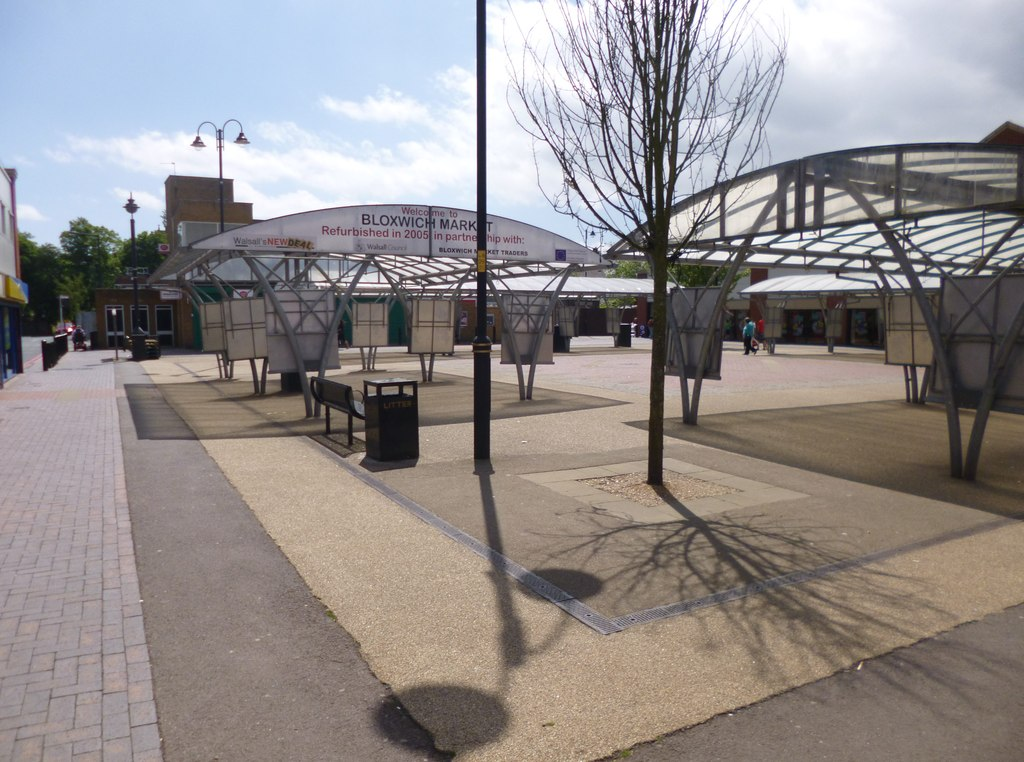
- Bloxwich Market

- Flag

- Location within the West Midlands
- Population: 25,401 (2011 Wards)
- OS grid reference: SJ998025
- Metropolitan borough: Walsall
- Metropolitan county: West Midlands
- Region: West Midlands
- Country: England
- Sovereign state: United Kingdom
- Areas of the town (2011 census BUASD): List: Beechdale (part); Blakenall Heath (Village); Coal Pool (part); Dudley Fields; Goscote (part); Harden (part); Leamore (part); Little Bloxwich; Lower Farm Estate; Mossley; Newtown (part); Turnberry Estate; Wallington Heath
- Post town: WALSALL
- Postcode district: WS3
- Dialling code: 01922
- Police: West Midlands
- Fire: West Midlands
- Ambulance: West Midlands
- UK Parliament: Walsall and Bloxwich

Bloxwich is a market town in the Metropolitan Borough of Walsall, West Midlands, England. It is located between the towns of Walsall, Cannock, Willenhall and Brownhills.

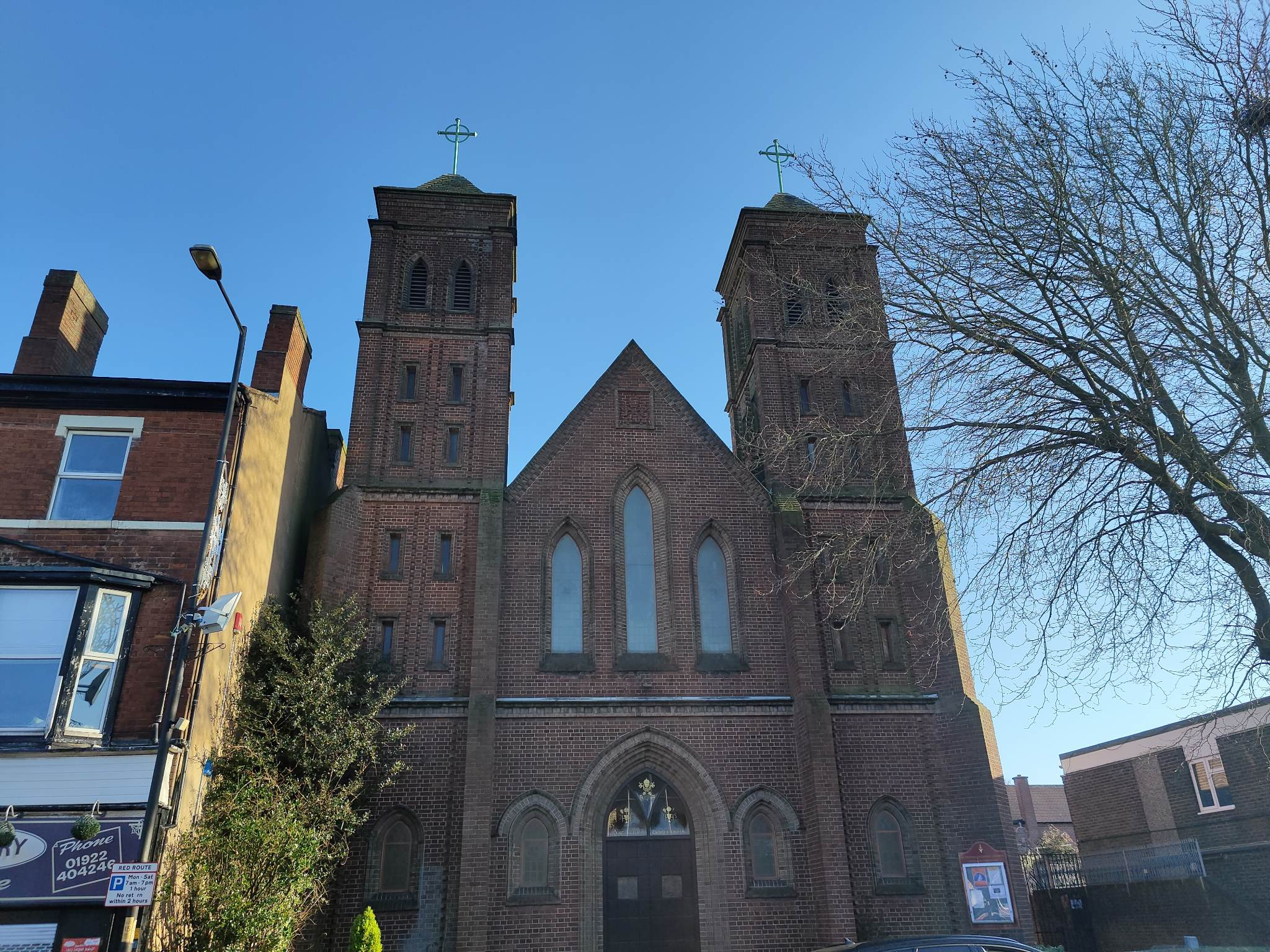
St Peter's R C Church

== Early history ==
Bloxwich has its origins at least as early as the Anglo-Saxon period, when the place name evidence suggests it was a small Mercian settlement named after the family of Bloc (Bloxwich, earlier Blochescwic, meaning "Bloc's village").

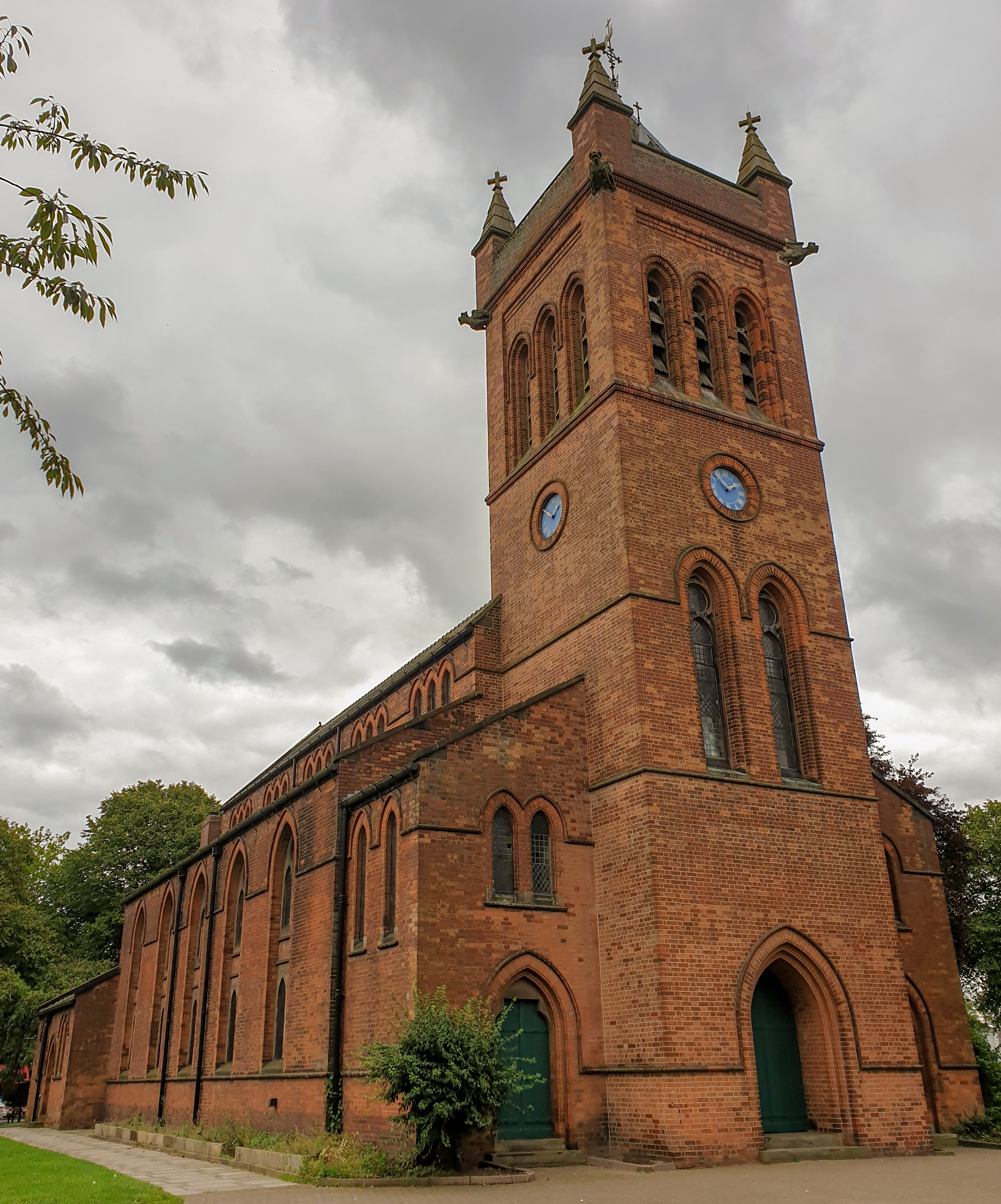
All Saints' Church, Bloxwich which is the parish church of the town

Some 19th-century works suggest that at one time Bloxwich was a settlement in the ancient manor of Wednesbury. There is no conclusive evidence for this and Bloxwich has since at least medieval times been associated with the manor and town of Walsall (which for reasons unknown does not appear in the Domesday Book of 1086). Bloxwich itself is however mentioned in this book under the name 'Blockeswich'. Traditionally there has been a strong rivalry between Bloxwich and Walsall with origins as early as the English Civil War, when Walsall was Parliamentarian in sympathy and Bloxwich, centre of the Foreign of Walsall, was Royalist. This situation was exacerbated by disputes over local taxation for the poor rate in the 17th and 18th centuries.

== 18th and 19th centuries ==
Bloxwich grew rapidly in the 18th century around coal mining, iron smelting and various manufacturing industries, as part of the Industrial Revolution. Manufacturing in the area consisted of bridle bits, stirrups, keys, cabinet locks, plane irons, buckle tongues, chains and saddles. Its most famous product of manufacture were awl blades, which it is reputed to have surpassed all other places in the United Kingdom in manufacturing. In the early 19th century, Bloxwich was still a village. Most of its inhabitants were employed in the newly founded mining and forging industries, as well as light metalworking. It is also known for its canals.

== 20th and 21st centuries ==
Bloxwich was heavily developed between the wars for council housing. Most were constructed around Blakenall Heath, as well as Harden and Goscote. In the 20 years which followed the Second World War, the Lower Farm, Beechdale and Mossley estates were also erected as council housing developments, while the southern side of Harden was developed along with the Rivers Estate at Blakenall Heath. Many privately owned houses, mostly in the Little Bloxwich area, were also constructed. In the 1990s and 2000s, many new housing developments have sprung up both in Bloxwich and at Blakenall Heath.

Bloxwich was struck by an F1/T2 tornado on 23 November 1981, as part of the record-breaking nationwide tornado outbreak on that day. The tornado later moved out over Walsall town centre, causing further damage.

Bloxwich has in recent years completed numerous redevelopment projects. Bloxwich Police Station, opened in 1884 on Elmore Green Road, was closed for reconstruction in 2000, and reopened by Princess Anne on 26 September 2002. (It also has responsibility for Walsall, Willenhall and Darlaston.) The market square and library have also been refurbished.

== Town centre and surroundings ==
Bloxwich town centre is mostly made up of Victorian and Edwardian buildings and leafy parks and gardens, which maintain its origins as a Staffordshire town. Good built examples are Bloxwich Hospital, Bloxwich Hall, All Saints' Church and several private houses in Station Street, Stafford Road, Wolverhampton Street and Sandbank. Places of worship include the twin-towered St Peter's Roman Catholic Church, built in 1869.

A 2013 report from the Townscape Heritage Research Unit at Oxford Brookes University states that, as a result of economic decline "the architectural quality of Bloxwich has been steadily eroded, with a high proportion of upper floor disuse and deteriorating/lost architectural detail, poor shop fronts and inappropriate advertising".

From the Georgian period to the 1960s, Bloxwich had more public houses than any other town in the Metropolitan Borough of Walsall, though these have begun to disappear.

Beyond Bloxwich Golf Club, Yieldfields Hall, to the north of the town on the A34 marks the northernmost edge of Bloxwich, Walsall and the West Midlands, currently in the border with Staffordshire.

The town incorporates a number of areas that were previously separate hamlets, such as Little Bloxwich and Wallington Heath. The pool at Wallington Heath besides the A34, Stafford Road dates back to the 1870s and was a watering place for horses.

Council-built housing includes the Lower Farm and Turnberry estates.

== Deprivation ==
Based on a 2019 Index of Multiple Deprivation report, north Walsall, which covers Bloxwich, Blakenall and Birchills-Leamore is the most deprived area of Walsall, which is itself in the 10% most deprived areas of the UK. 32% of children in the north of Walsall, received free school meals. Of the four areas of Walsall, the north had the highest number of children excluded from school. Ofsted states that "Bloxwich West is an area of higher than average unemployment and lower than average academic achievement. Bloxwich East contains a more affluent community, with pockets of higher deprivation".

Bloxwich was part of the Blakenall New Deal for Communities (NDC) area. A review of heritage and conservation work carried out in Bloxwich between 2001 and 2010 under the NDC and other regeneration schemes reported a "mixed" picture of progress. Not all available funding had been used. People did feel that they were safer in the area, and school results had improved, but the sense of community in Bloxwich was weak and "Not surprisingly, people’s hopes for their future income and job prospects are not very positive ... Bloxwich remains a challenging town in terms of quality of life, and its economic prospects".

== Politics ==
Bloxwich forms part of the Walsall and Bloxwich parliamentary constituency. At the 2024 general election, Valerie Vaz representing the Labour Party was elected as its Member of Parliament (MP).

Bloxwich is made up of two council wards: Bloxwich East & Blakenall Heath and Bloxwich West. Each ward elects three councillors to Walsall Metropolitan Borough Council. Following the May 2026 local elections, Bloxwich East & Blakenall Heath has three councillors from Reform UK (Aiden Clarke, Richard Tapper and David Sambrook). Bloxwich West also elected three Reform UK councillors (Nicky Barker, Paul Nugent and Tony Sadla).

== Education ==
=== Primary schools ===
- Sunshine Infant School
- Blakenall Heath Junior School
- Bloxwich Academy
- Harden Primary School
- Leamore Primary School
- Busill Jones Primary School
- Jubilee Academy Mossley (Formerly Mossley Primary School)
- Little Bloxwich Church of England Primary School
- Elmore Green Primary School
- St Peter's Catholic Primary School
- Lower Farm Primary School
- Abbey Primary School
- All Saints National Academy (Formerly Bloxwich CofE Primary School)

=== Secondary schools ===
- Bloxwich Academy
- Walsall Academy

=== Defunct schools ===
- Black Country University Technical College
- Forest Comprehensive School
- Sneyd Comprehensive School
- T. P. Riley Comprehensive School

== Transport ==
Bloxwich is well-served by public transport and has two railway stations, Bloxwich and Bloxwich North. Trains from these stations are operated by West Midlands Railway.

Regular buses link Bloxwich with Walsall, whilst others link the area to the surrounding towns and cities of Wolverhampton, Bilston, Willenhall, Brownhills, Wednesfield, Cannock and Birmingham. Other local services serve nearby estates of Turnberry, Coalpool, Harden, Mossley, Lower Farm, Goscote, Leamore, Beechdale, Dudley Fields, Landywood, Great Wyrley and Pelsall.

Services 9, 29, 31, 32, 70 and X51 are operated by National Express West Midlands whilst services 23 and 25 are operated by Walsall Community Transport; services 31, 32 and 326 by Diamond West Midlands and service 19 by Carolean Coaches. Services 31 and 32 are operated in partnership with a joint timetable and ticketing.

Arriva Midlands Cannock used to run services 1 and 2 between Cannock and Bloxwich up to four buses an hour but these were later withdrawn after the sale of depot.

The A34, Southampton/Oxford/Manchester road, goes straight through the town and forms its High Street. Most shops are based on this linear development. The A4124 Wolverhampton to Brownhills road crosses to the north of the town. Bloxwich is 4 miles (6.4 km) from the M6 motorway between junctions 10 and 11.

== Notable residents ==
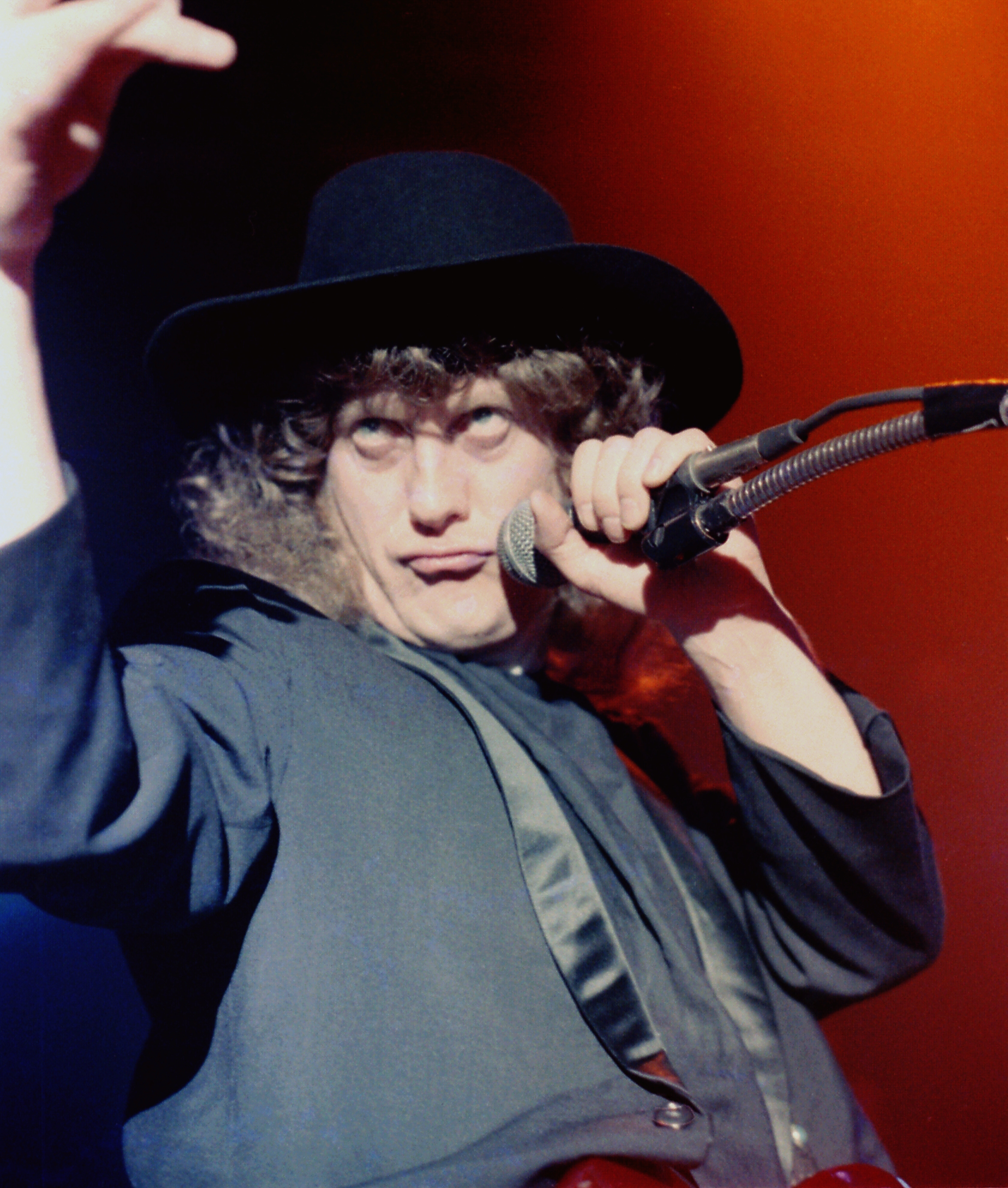
Noddy Holder, 1981

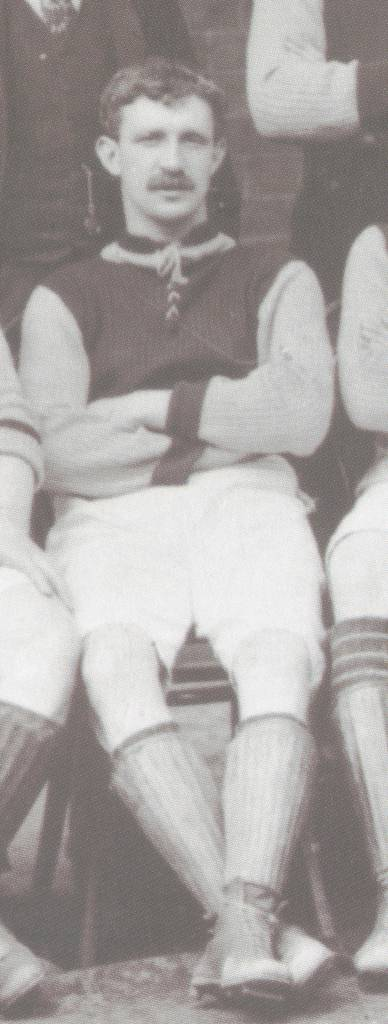
Charlie Athersmith, 1896

- Sir Harry Smith Parkes GCMG KCB (1828–1885), diplomat who served in Japan and China.
- Pat Collins (1859–1943), showman and Liberal MP for Walsall (1922–1924) and Mayor of Walsall (1938).
- Tom Major-Ball (1879–1962), music hall performer and father of former Prime Minister John Major
- Harold Parry (1896–1917), World War I poet.
- Maurice Wiggin (1912–1986), journalist and author
- Phil Drabble (1914–2007), countryman, author and TV presenter, notably One Man and His Dog.
- Arthur Tolcher (1922–1987), virtuoso British harmonica player and child star.
- Neville "Noddy" Holder (born 1946), former lead singer with the rock group Slade; born in the Caldmore area of Walsall, he and his family moved to the Beechdale Estate.
- Rob Halford (born 1951), lead singer of heavy metal band Judas Priest, still owns a local house despite being a US resident.
- Meera Syal (born 1961), comedian, writer, playwright, singer, journalist and actress.
- Garry Newman (born 1982), developer of the 2006 video game Garry's Mod and local owner of Facepunch Studios.

=== Sport ===
- Charlie Athersmith (1872–1910), footballer who played 369 games, including 269 for Aston Villa and 12 games for England
- Bill Dolman (1906-1964), football goalkeeper, played 226 games, including 103 for Chesterfield F.C.
- Fred Davis (1929–1996), footballer who played 293 games including 230 for Wrexham A.F.C.
- Derek Pace (1932–1989), footballer who played 284 games, including 253 for Sheffield United F.C.
- Bobby Downes (born 1949), footballer who played 470 games and also a coach and manager.
- Kenny Mower (born 1960) footballer who played 415 games for Walsall
- Lee Naylor (born 1980), former footballer who played 439 games, including 293 for Wolves.
