= Ben Reid (disambiguation) =

Ben Reid may refer to:

- Ben Reid, Australian rules footballer
- Ben Reed, American actor
- Ben Reid (cooperativist)
- Benton Reed, American football player
- Benedict Read, English art historian
- Ben Reade, British speedway rider
