= Tolcher =

Tolcher is a surname. Notable people with the surname include:

- Arthur Tolcher (1922–1987), British harmonica player
- Michael Tolcher (born 1973), American singer-songwriter
