= Pouk Hill =

Hill in Walsall, West Midlands, England

Coordinates: 52.593°N 2.013°W

Pouk Hill is a hill located in Walsall, West Midlands, England.

The hill is situated off Bloxwich Lane in the Birchills area of the town, and overlooks the M6 motorway as well as the Beechdale housing estate.

== Slade ==
Pouk Hill inspired the title of a Slade song of the same name, released on their 1970 album Play It Loud. Lead singer Noddy Holder lived on the Beechdale estate. The cover photograph of the band's first album, Beginnings, was taken on the hill in mid-winter, in the snow. The uncomfortable memory of the photographer insisting that the band strip to the waist in sub-zero temperatures inspired the lyrics of the song.
