= Black Country UTC =

Location
- Vernon Way; Bloxwich, Walsall, West Midlands, WS3 2PA; England; 52.62035°N 2.02983°W

Information
- Type: University Technical College
- Motto: Bringing engineering and science to life...
- Established: 2011
- Closed: 2015
- Department for Education URN: 136933 Tables
- Ofsted: Reports
- Age: 14 to 19
- Enrolment: 157 (on closure)
- Capacity: 480
- Capital investment: £9.5 million
- Website: http://www.blackcountryutc.co.uk/

Black Country UTC was a university technical college (UTC) located in the Bloxwich area of Walsall, West Midlands, England. The University of Wolverhampton and Walsall College were the lead academic sponsors of the UTC, and Siemens acted as the lead business partner for the UTC. The UTC closed at the end of August 2015.

== History ==
Black Country UTC opened in September 2011, and was the second university technical college to open in England as part of the university technical colleges programme. The UTC was located on the site of the former Sneyd Comprehensive School, a secondary school in Walsall which closed during the Summer of 2011 due to falling pupil numbers. The school site was extensively refurbished to accommodate the new UTC. A second phase of renovation was completed in September 2013.

In April 2015 it was announced that Black Country UTC would close at the end of August 2015, with all pupils either graduating or being given places at other local schools. The decision to close the UTC was made after two Ofsted reports stated that the school required improvement, and overall low student numbers.

== Curriculum ==
The UTC specialised in engineering and science, and offered education for pupils aged 14 to 19. At ages 14–16, pupils studied a Higher Diploma in Engineering or BTEC First Diploma in Engineering in conjunction with a range of GCSE options. For sixth form education, students chose between three routes of study:

- The Technical and Academic studies route required all students to study an Advanced Engineering Diploma or a BTEC National Diploma in Engineering. In addition, all students were expected to study the German language. Students could also choose to study between 1 and 3 other subjects in addition to their core engineering studies.
- The Apprenticeships route required all students to study a Level 2 and 3 Apprenticeship in Engineering on a full-time or day release basis in conjunction with Walsall College.
- The Pre Apprenticeship routes required all students to study a Performing Engineering Operations course, a BTEC First in Engineering and Functional Skills in English, Maths and ICT. Students also had the opportunity to retake GCSE English and Maths.
