= Wood Green Academy =

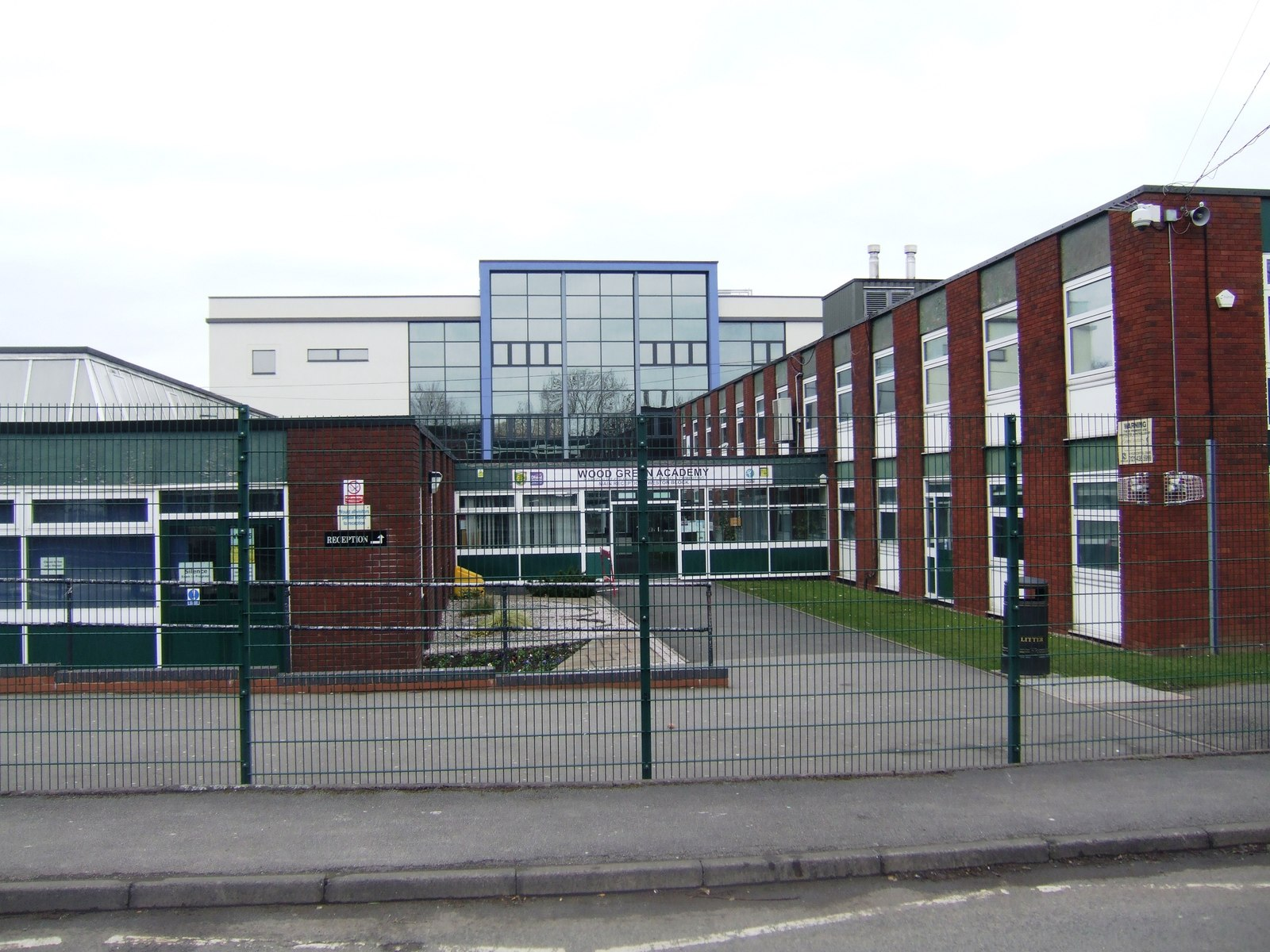
- Wood Green Academy pictured in 2013

Location
- Wood Green Road; Wednesbury, West Midlands, WS10 9QU; England; 52.563505°N 2.0043073°W

Information
- Type: Academy
- Established: 1924
- Local authority: Sandwell
- Department for Education URN: 136616 Tables
- Ofsted: Reports
- Head teacher: J Topham
- Gender: Coeducational
- Age: 11 to 18
- Enrolment: 1450
- Former name: Wednesbury Grammar School
- Website: http://www.woodgreenacademy.co.uk

Wood Green Academy is a coeducational secondary school and sixth form with academy status located in Wednesbury, West Midlands, England. In 2009, Ofsted listed Wood Green as one of 12 outstanding schools serving disadvantaged communities.

== Admissions ==
The head teacher is James Topham, who started the role in September 2014, taking over from Pank Patel. Pank succeeded the retiring Enid Bibby, who had been head teacher for eight years and became a dame in 2004 following a significant increase in academic results at the school during her tenure.

The school is situated on the A461 Wood Green Road which connects Wednesbury with Walsall.

== History ==
=== Grammar school ===
The school was originally named Wednesbury Boys' High School. It was a grammar school that opened in Wood Green House, St. Paul's Road in 1924 under the headship of C. H. S. Kipping. The school was sometimes called Wednesbury Grammar School.

=== Comprehensive ===
The buildings were expanded during the 1950s, and by 1970 the school had been converted to a comprehensive school.

In 1968, it merged with Wood Green Secondary Modern School to become Wood Green Bilateral School. The Wednesbury Girls' High School, a girls' grammar school, merged into the sixth form. It became Wood Green High School in September 1969, serving pupils of both sexes.

The school includes a sixth form for pupils aged over 16.

In 2023 the school was found to have some potentially structurally unsound classrooms due to the use of reinforced autoclaved aerated concrete as a building material.

== Alumni ==
=== Wood Green Academy ===
- Jaydon Paddock, athlete who competes in trampoline gymnastics

=== Wednesbury Boys' High School ===
- Kevin Satchwell, headteacher of Thomas Telford School, knighted for services to education
