= Kevin Satchwell =

British educator (born 1952)

Kevin Joseph Satchwell
- Born: Kevin Satchwell; 6 March 1952
- Education: Wodensborough High School, Wednesbury Boys' High School
- Alma mater: Open University
- Occupations: Executive Headmaster, Chief Executive
- Spouse: Lady Maria Satchwell
- Children: Francesca Satchwell, Joe Satchwell

Sir Kevin Joseph Satchwell (born 6 March 1952) is a British educator who is former headmaster of Thomas Telford School in Shropshire and the founding Chief Executive (CEO) to the Thomas Telford Multi Academy Trust (TTMAT).

Satchwell was born in Wednesbury, Staffordshire, the son of Joseph and Pauline Satchwell. He was educated at Wodensborough High School, Wednesbury Boys' High School, Shoreditch College of Technology and the Open University.

He was knighted in 2001. In July 2010, Satchwell received an honorary doctorate from Staffordshire University.

He served as Headmaster of Thomas Telford School for over 30 years, beginning in 1991, and ending in 2023. He still stays as an advisor to the trust, however the former Associate Headmaster Ian Rawlings was his successor as Headteacher.

== Personal life ==
In 1975, Satchwell married Maria Bernadette Grimes, the Headteacher of Madeley Academy; the couple have a son and a daughter.
