= Thomas Telford School =

Location
- Telford, Shropshire, TF3 4NW; England; 52.6776°N 2.4583°W

Information
- Type: City Technology College
- Motto: Quality through cooperation
- Established: 1991
- Local authority: Telford and Wrekin
- Specialist: Business, Science and Technology
- Department for Education URN: 123627 Tables
- Ofsted: Reports
- Headmaster: Ian Rawlings
- Deputy Head(s): Emma Powell & Alex Bird
- Gender: mixed
- Age: 11 to 18
- Enrolment: 1650
- Colours: Thomas Telford Maroon & White
- Website: www.ttsonline.net

Thomas Telford School is a coeducational, 11-18 City Technology College in Telford, Shropshire, England. It was founded by The Mercers’ Company and Tarmac Holdings Ltd.

Opened in 1991, the school is one of fifteen City Technology Colleges established by the Department for Education, with the goal of providing expertise to students in science, technology, and mathematics. The school has remained a City Technology College since its establishment, making it one of the few institutions to retain this status after the expansion of the academy programme in England.

The school is notable for its academic results, being the first state school in which 100% of students achieved 5 or more GCSE's between A* and C.

== History ==
The school was founded in 1991 as the eighth of fifteen specialist City Technology Colleges set up to raise educational standards in inner-city areas. The catchment area includes Telford, Wolverhampton and the villages and suburbs in between. One of the school's initial main aims was to help relieve the under-performing schools in the urban areas of Wolverhampton. Thomas Telford School previously generated significant funds through the sale of its online curriculum content and qualifications sold through a subsidiary company TTSOnline Limited (Thomas Telford School Online Limited).

In 2009, pupils from the school were chosen to construct Airfix models of planes and tanks, and to assist Top Gear co-host James May construct a life size model of a World War II Spitfire on the first episode of the series James May's Toy Stories.

The school’s founding headmaster was Sir Kevin Satchwell, who led the school from its opening until 2024. During his tenure the school became known for its examination performance, extensive use of information technology and emphasis on attendance, behaviour and parental engagement. In the 2001 New Year Honours he was knighted for services to education.

Ian Rawlings became Headmaster in 2024.

== Information technology ==
The school has used IT for education, making use of electronic whiteboards provided by Smart Technologies in all classrooms, learning bases and study rooms. The school provides an extranet, which is run using Virtual Office, allowing students and staff to access their files and e-mail from home.

The school has a CAD/CAM suite; which provides access to Roland CAM CNC milling and machining equipment and a set of 3D printers. The CAD/CAM suite also consists of an HP A1 Pantone printer, HP A3 colour laser printer and HP A3 inkjet laser printer as well as the school's network of other laser printers. The CAD/CAM suite also houses around fifty computers for students to produce work on the various CAD packages the school has which includes the latest version of AutoDesk Inventor.

The school hosts its online curriculum in-house, with a web server and Real Streaming Media Server housed in the computer services department of the school.

== School life ==
Since 2024, the schools Headmaster has been Ian Rawlings. He replaced former Headmaster Kevin Satchwell.

=== Academics ===
The school's then headmaster, Kevin Satchwell, was knighted in 2001 for services to education and the community, and from 1998 to the present day, TTS has been named 'the most successful Comprehensive school in the UK', after 100% of its pupils gained 5 or more GCSEs at A*-C, being the first and only comprehensive school ever to do so in 1998.

=== Sports ===
Emphasis is placed on sport at Thomas Telford. The schools primary sport is football, which is open to all students throughout their time at the school. The sixth form operates a Football Academy for talented students to play at the highest level of school football. The school maintains connections with professional and semi-pro clubs, and provides students with high quality coaching and facilities. As such, the school has consistently won regional and national football titles: the school has made 60 ESFA finals, and has more wins than any other UK School.

The school has also been successful in swimming. The school maintains a 25m pool that is used for both teaching students to swim and for the schools swim team. The senior teams have seen success at both county level events, as well as national swim meets. The schools synchronised swimming teams are currently national champions and a former student won a gold medal in the European School Games in 2006.

Other sports the school partakes in include cricket, athletics, hockey, tennis, netball, and basketball.

=== Performing Arts ===
Thomas Telford operates a performing arts academy as part of its sixth form. In recent years, the school choir has been invited to perform at the Royal Albert Hall.

== Ranking and Facilities ==
The school no longer uses the traditional yardstick of five or more GCSE passes at grades A* to C since all students achieved at least 12 GCSE passes at grades A* to C.

The school at one time in the first decade of the 21st century was the best-performing comprehensive school in England.

In recent years, most pupils have achieved grade 4 or above in English and mathematics GCSE, with a substantial proportion attaining grade 5 or above. A high proportion of sixth-form students progress to higher education, including universities within the Russell Group.

The school has received national recognition for its academic outcomes and has frequently appeared among the higher-performing state secondary schools in England in published performance tables.

== Expansion ==
In 2004, Thomas Telford School partnered with a local school, Madeley Academy, placing members of its own senior leadership in charge. The academy was graded Outstanding by Ofsted in 2009.

The school has helped set up two other schools. These are in Walsall and Sandwell; both are now fully built and operational. These are headed by former Deputy Headteachers at Thomas Telford School. All four current academies compete in Inter-Academy competitions throughout the year in a variety of sports.

The School sponsored The Bulwell Academy between 2012 and 2018.

In 2017, Madeley, Walsall, and Sandwell Academies became members of the Thomas Telford Multi-Academy Trust (TTMAT). Redhill Primary Academy joined in 2018, and Thomas Telford University Technical College in 2020. Thomas Telford Primary Free School opened in 2025.

== Notable alumni and Staff ==
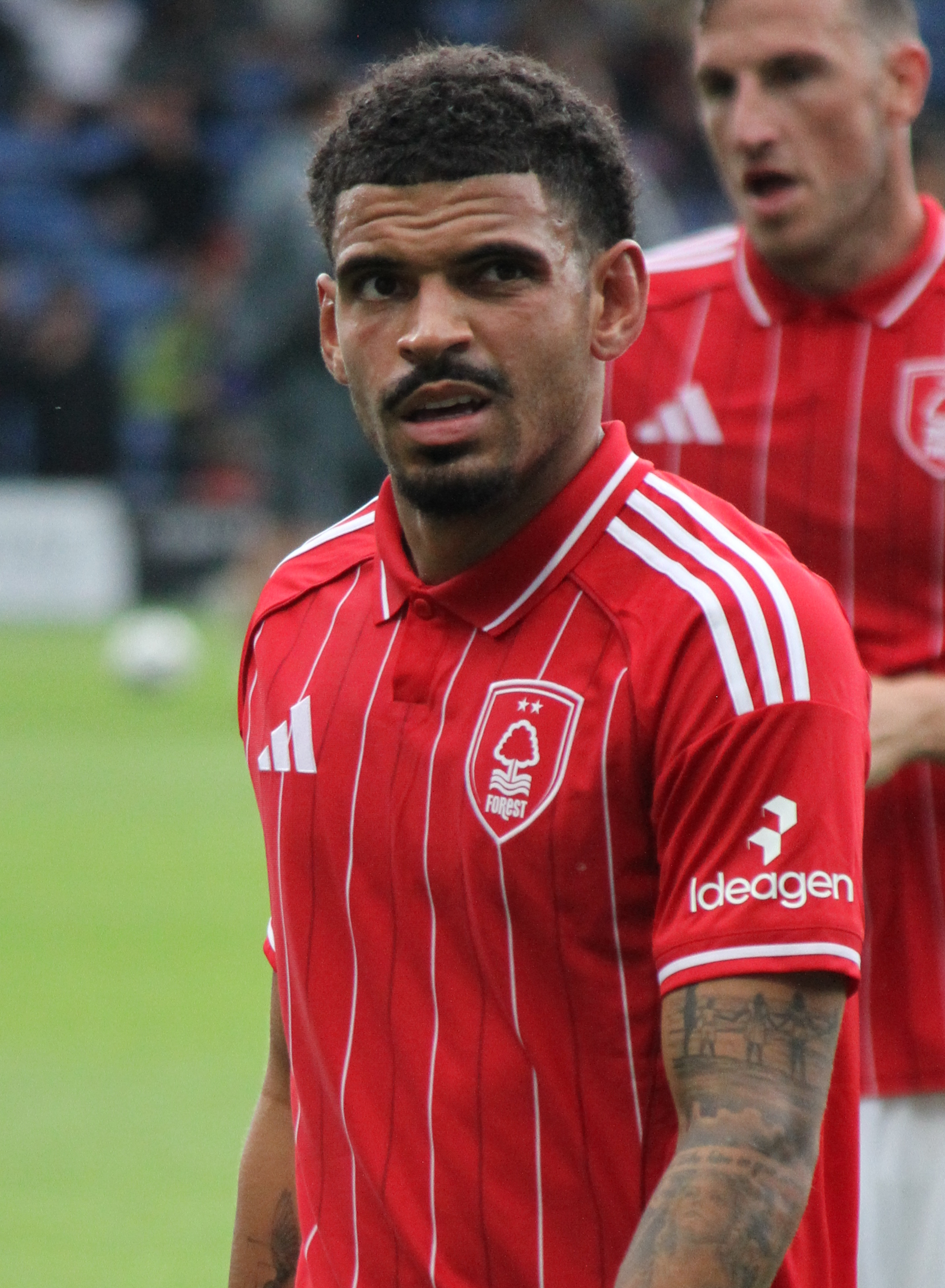
Morgan Gibbs-White, Footballer

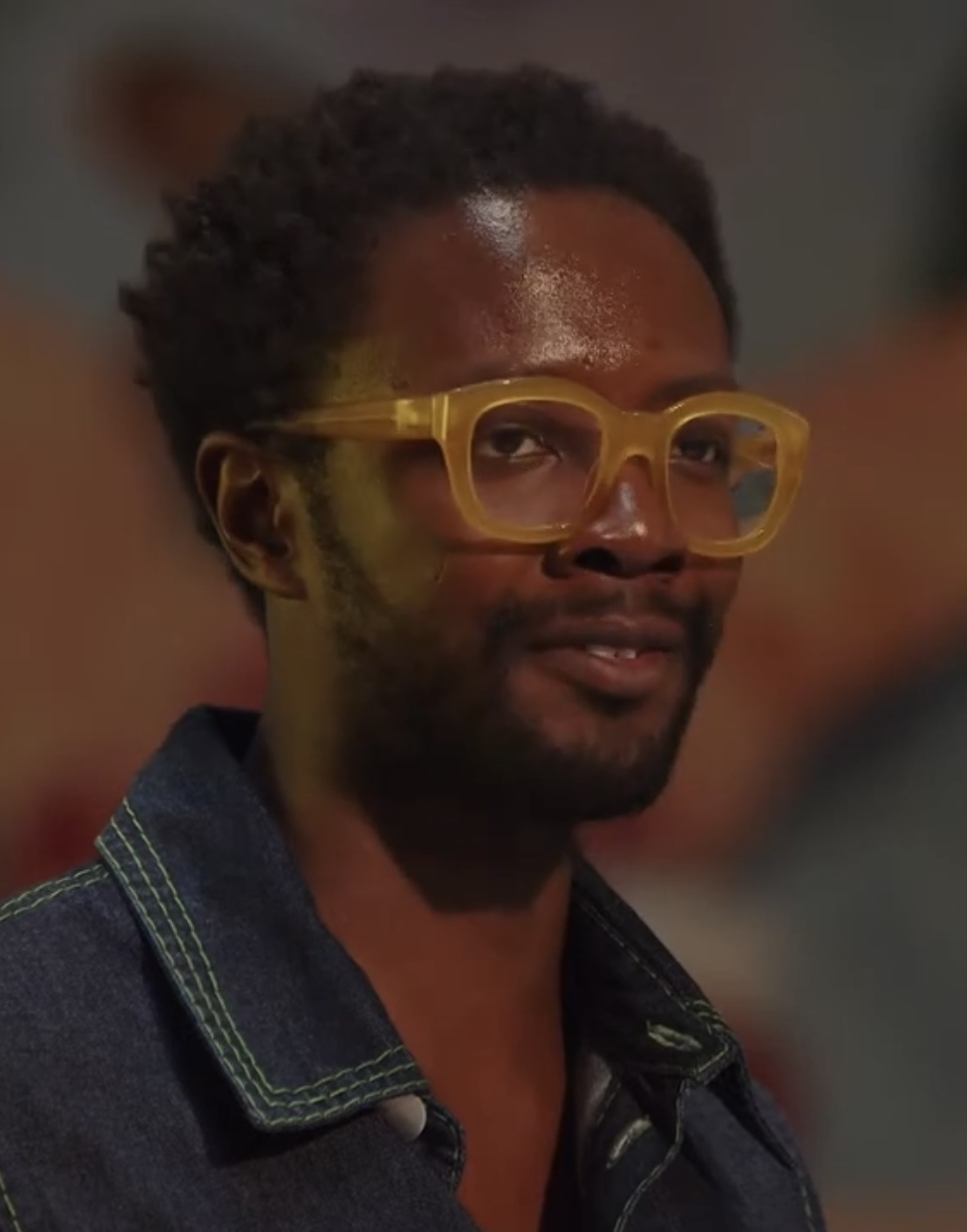
Omari Douglas, Actor

=== Notable Alumni ===
==== Sport ====
- Ricky Balshaw - British Para equestrian
- Ryan Barnett - Footballer who plays for Milton Keynes Dons F.C.
- Elliott Bennett - Footballer who plays for Shifnal Town F.C.
- Chem Campbell - Footballer who plays for Stevenage F.C.
- Luke Cundle - Footballer who plays for Millwall F.C.
- Kelly Edwards - British Judoka
- Taylor Gardner-Hickman - Footballer who plays for Birmingham City F.C.
- Danny Guthrie - Footballer who played for Reading and Newcastle.
- Connor Goldson - Footballer who plays for Aris Limassol.
- David Goodfield - English Hockey player
- Morgan Gibbs-White - Footballer who plays for Nottingham Forest.
- Ethan McLeod - Footballer who played for Macclesfield Town F.C.
- Taylor Perry - Footballer who plays for Exeter City F.C.
- Jackson Smith - Footballer who plays for Port Vale F.C.
- Sam Morsy - Footballer who plays for Bristol City.
- Dylan Williams - Footballer who plays for Motherwell F.C.

==== Performing Arts ====
- Sophie Bould - Understudy for 'Maria' in London's West End Production of The Sound of Music.
- Omari Douglas - Actor who starred in It's a Sin

==== Other Alumni ====
- Sharmadean Reid - Stylist, Founder of Wah Nails.
- Kim Hughes - British Army bomb disposal expert and George Cross recipient.

=== Notable Staff ===
- Kevin Satchwell
- Des Lyttle
