= All Saints' Church, Bloxwich =

Parish church of Bloxwich, West Midlands County, England

- Church of All Saints, Bloxwich
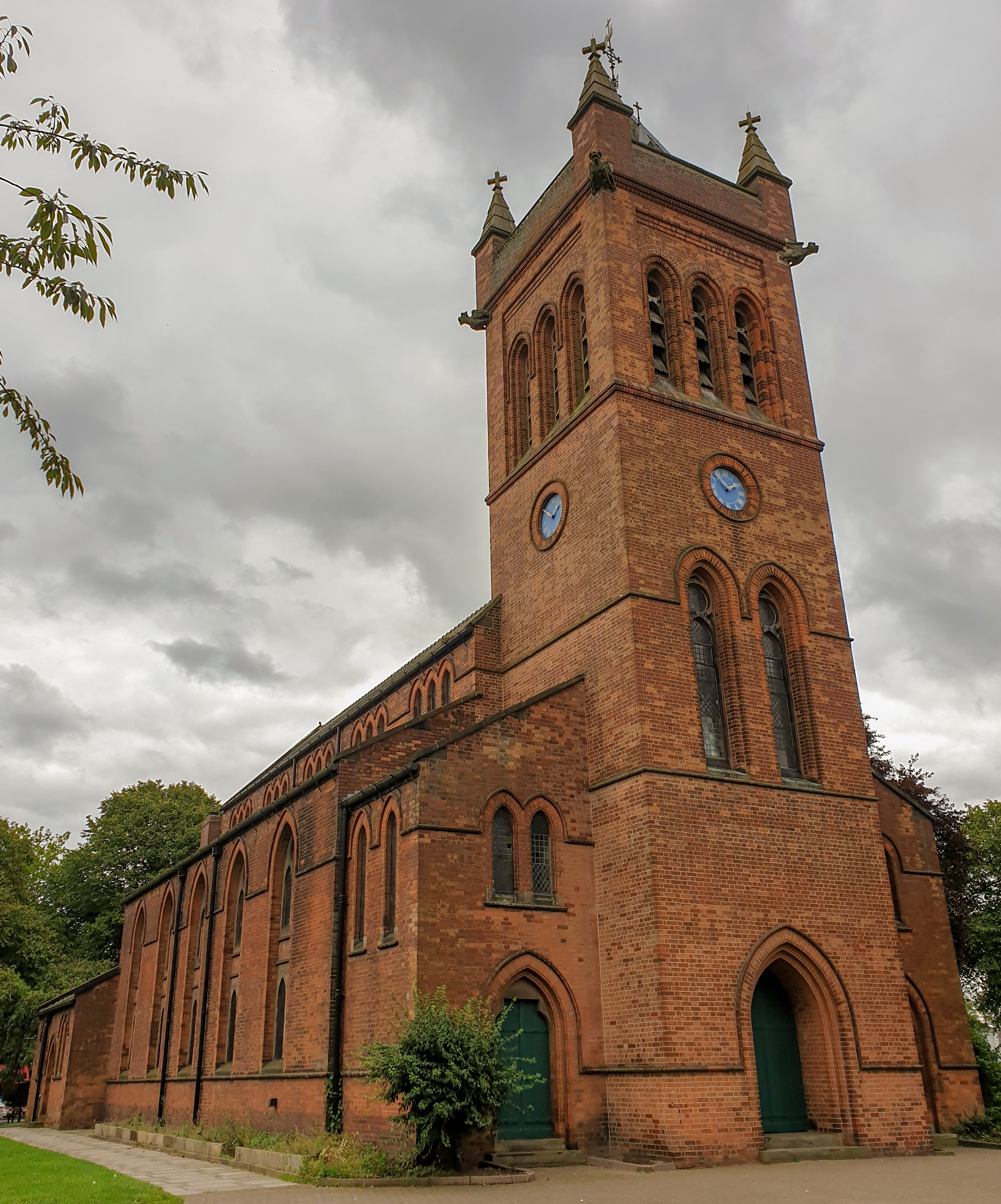
- All Saints' Church, Bloxwich
- All Saints' Church, Bloxwich
- 52.614979°N 2.005035°W
- Location: Bloxwich, Metropolitan Borough of Walsall, West Midlands County
- Country: England
- Denomination: Church of England
- Website: www.bloxwichparish.org.uk

History
- Status: Parish church
- Dedication: All Saints
- Dedicated: 1791
- Consecrated: 1791

Architecture
- Functional status: Active
- Heritage designation: Grade II
- Designated: July 1986
- Completed: 1794

Administration
- Province: Canterbury
- Diocese: Lichfield

All Saints' Church is the parish church of the town of Bloxwich in the Metropolitan Borough of Walsall in the West Midlands County of England. It is located to the south of the High Street, close to the junctionwith Elmore Green Road. It is a Grade II listed building. An 18th-century cross in the churchyard has its own Grade II listing.

== History ==
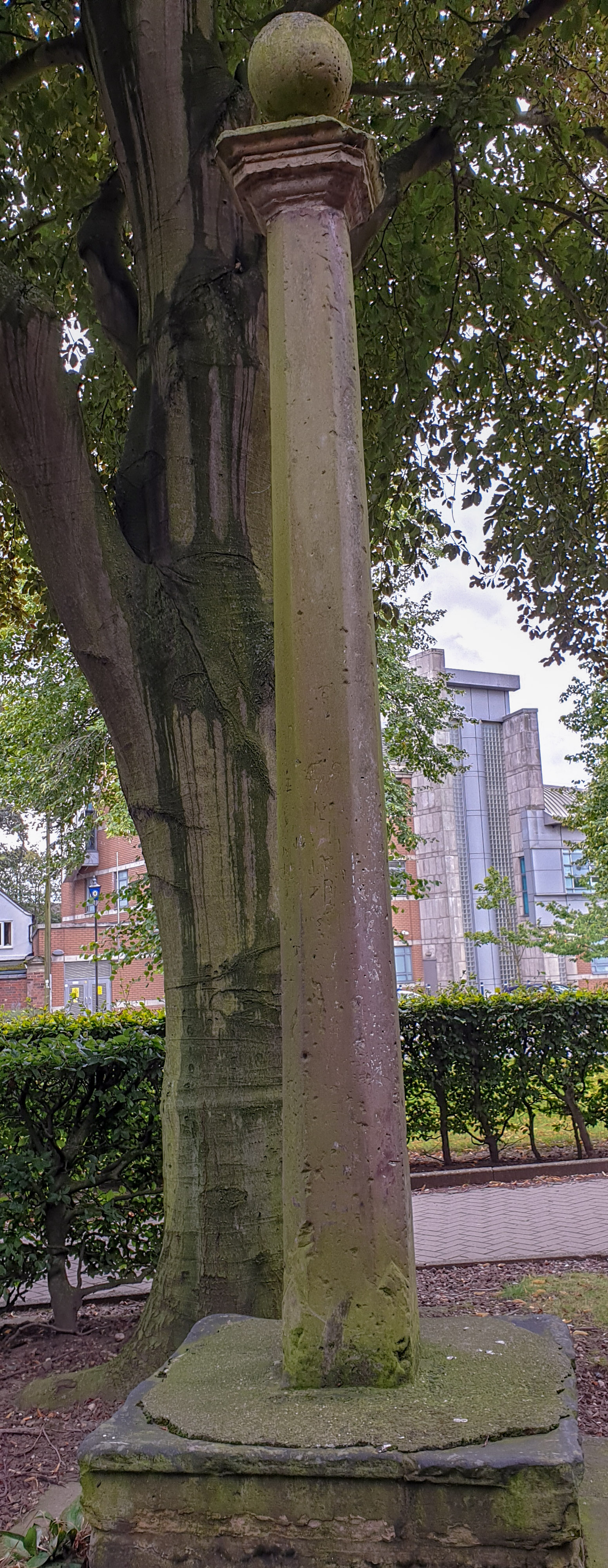
The Grade II listed monument outside All Saints' Church, Bloxwich

The church was built between 1791 and 1794 and additional alterations and extensions were made between 1875 and 1877. It was given Grade II listed status in July 1986 by Historic England. A cross in the churchyard has its own Grade II listing.

== Present day ==
The church serves as a local landmark and place of worship and community gatherings.
