= Beechdale, West Midlands =

Housing estate in Walsall, England

Coordinates: 52°36′04″N 2°00′31″W

Beechdale
- Suburb
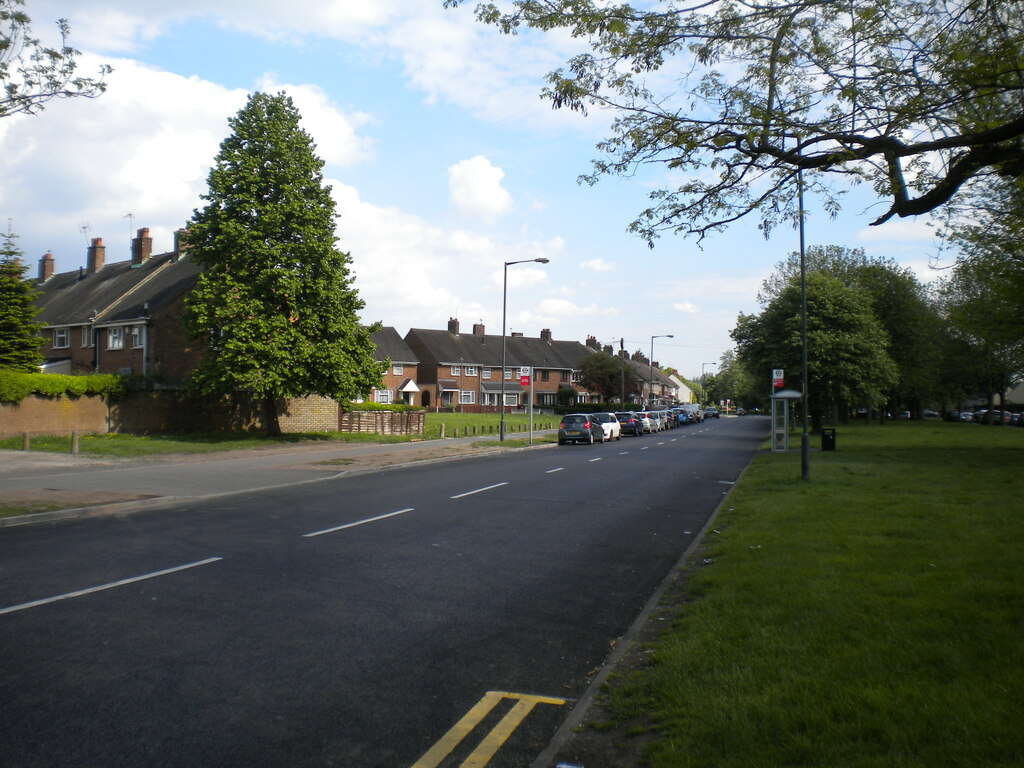
- Stephenson Avenue in Beechdale, Walsall

- Location within the West Midlands
- OS grid reference: SJ992004
- Metropolitan borough: Walsall
- Metropolitan county: West Midlands
- Region: West Midlands
- Country: England
- Sovereign state: United Kingdom
- Post town: WALSALL
- Postcode district: WS2
- Dialling code: 01922
- Police: West Midlands
- Fire: West Midlands
- Ambulance: West Midlands
- UK Parliament: Walsall and Bloxwich

Beechdale is a housing estate in the borough of Walsall, in the county of the West Midlands, England, that was developed predominantly during the 1950s and 1960s.The estate lies between the towns of Walsall and Bloxwich and is bordered by the M6 motorway to the west and the Wyrley and Essington Canal to the east.

== History ==
Walsall Council built the first houses on Remington Road, Stephenson Avenue and Faraday Road in 1952, the streets being named after 18th and 19th century inventors and scientists. The estate was originally named the Gypsy Lane Estate, but this was disliked by residents, who successfully lobbied the council to change the name. Beechdale was connected to the Walsall trolleybus network in 1955. Mobile grocery vans served the estate in its early years but custom dropped once the shopping parade on Stephenson Square was built in the late 1950s. Also built around this time were a community hall with a library, a church, and the Three Men in a Boat public house, presumably named after the humorous novel by Jerome K. Jerome, who was born in Bradford Street, Walsall. The pub built a reputation as a live music venue in the 1960s and 70s. Following the pub's closure the building was used for offices, but after laying empty for a number of years it was demolished in 2021.

Beechdale Lifelong Learning Centre opened its doors in 1998. In 2014, a campaign to have the Magic Lantern pub on Cavendish Road listed as an asset of community value helped save it from closure. In 2016, Walsall Council brought in a Public Spaces Protection Order covering the estate, in an attempt to combat anti-social behaviour.

== Local government ==
Following Walsall Metropolitan Borough Council ward changes effective from 2025–6, the estate will be part of the Beechdale, Leamore and Reedswood ward for local council elections. Immediately prior to this Beechdale was in the Birchills Leamore ward. The inclusion of Beechdale in the new ward's name was not in the draft recommendations of the Local Government Boundary Commission for England but support from Labour councillors and the Labour MP for the parliamentary constituency of Walsall and Bloxwich, Valerie Vaz convinced the Commission to amend the draft.

As of 2025, the ward is represented on Walsall council by two Conservatives and one Labour councillor.

== Education ==
Beechdale Infant School for 5-7 year olds opened in 1955 on Remington Road, followed by the 7-11 junior school in 1959. The two schools later merged to form Beechdale Primary School, which closed in 2006, with the school buildings being demolished in early 2007. Hatherton Primary School, which originally opened to infants in 1956 and juniors in 1960, and the former Frank F. Harrison Community School, which opened in 1965, merged to form the all-through Mirus Academy on 1 January 2012, later renamed, Bloxwich Academy.

== Open spaces ==
Beechdale Park adjoining the north of the estate is a marshy, natural woodland, designated a Site of Importance to Nature Conservation. It is one of six nature reserves making up a larger area of countryside named Rough Wood Chase. Reedswood Park lies to the south of the estate.

== Notable people ==
Noddy Holder, the lead singer of Slade, grew up on the estate after moving there as a child from Caldmore; his parents were among the estate's original residents in the 1950s. Other famous former residents of the estate are Rob Halford of Judas Priest and Martin Degville of Sigue Sigue Sputnik. Author of the Alternative History Series Age of the Navigator, Montgomery Harris is also from the estate. His roots are reflected in the series' main character Dale Beechman.

== Public transport ==
National Express West Midlands bus service no. 69 links Beechdale to Walsall and Wolverhampton and services 70 and 70A run to Bloxwich and Walsall.
