= Reedswood Park =

Park in Walsall, England

Coordinates: 52.5933°N 2.0030°W

Reedswood Park is a public park situated in Walsall, West Midlands, England. It is surrounded by the residential areas of Birchills and Beechdale, and is about half a mile west of Walsall town centre.

Historically, the park had an outdoor public swimming pool dating from 1888, and updated in 1931; it was demolished some time after 1993.

The modern park has a skating ramp, children's play area, outdoor gym, fishing pond, a basketball court and football pitches.

In 2013, there was a semi-wild conservation area. In May 2023, there were plans to restore the park's ponds to create a wildlife habitat. The park was awarded Green Flag status in July 2023.
