= Fred Davis (footballer, born 1929) =

English footballer

Personal information
- Full name: Joseph Frederick Davis
- Date of birth: 23 May 1929
- Place of birth: Bloxwich, Staffordshire, England
- Date of death: 10 September 1996 (aged 67)
- Place of death: Surrey, England
- Position: Wing-half

Youth career
- Bloxwich Strollers

Senior career*
Years	Team	Apps	(Gls)
1952–1955	Reading	63	(1)
1954–1961	Wrexham	230	(12)
- Rhyl
- * Club domestic league appearances and goals

Joseph Frederick Davis (23 May 1929 – 10 September 1996) was an English professional footballer who played as a wing-half. He made appearances in the English Football League during the 1950s and 60s with Reading and Wrexham.
