= Enid Bibby =

British headteacher

Dame Enid Bibby, DBE (born 8 February 1951, Sheffield) is a British educator who garnered notability for her role as headteacher in improving Wood Green High School in Wednesbury, West Midlands.

== Career ==
=== Wood Green High School ===
When Bibby was appointed to Wood Green High School College of Sport in Sandwell in September 1998, 31% of the school's pupils were gaining 5 or more A*-C grades at GCSE level. By 2004, however, 63% of the school's GCSE pupils were achieving this standard.

Enid Bibby was made Dame Commander of the Order of the British Empire in the Queen's Birthday Honours of 2004. She retired in July 2006 and was replaced by Pankesh

== Educational boards ==
Since leaving Wood Green she has shared her knowledge and experience as an Educational consultant, working principally with Telford and Wrekin LA and Cumbria LA. In October 2004, Bibby became a member of the British Educational Communications and Technology Agency.

Part of her work to this commitment was a presentation delivered at a Capita conference.

In November 2006, Bibby also became a member of the Ofsted non-executive board.

== Personal life ==
She was the second wife of educationalist and writer Bob Bibby, who died 6 June 2014.
