= T. P. Riley Comprehensive School =

T. P. Riley Community School was originally a Technical High School located in Bloxwich, West Midlands, England. An 11-plus pass was required to get a place there until sometime in 1964 when the school became a Comprehensive.

Built in 1958 to serve the expanding town of Bloxwich, it was situated on Lichfield Road, replacing Elmore Green High School in the town centre, the buildings of which survived for several years as an annex. From 1973 until around 1990 the old Elmore Green buildings became incorporated as an annex to the comprehensive school.

Famous pupils at T. P. Riley include Noddy Holder, who became the lead singer of Slade and Garry Newman, developer of the game Garry's Mod and owner of Facepunch Studios.

Before any of these was a 'beat group' who all attended the school who were on the ATV programme 'Up and Doing' in June 1963. This was the pilot programme for 'For Teenagers Only ' and the 4 lads were one of the first groups in the Midlands to have been on the TV. They were; Anthony Hawkins, Dennis Shaw, Keith Nolan and Eric Thacker.

The school received news coverage in October 1988 when one of the school's history teachers, Bernard Butt (aged 44), was killed on a cruise ship, the MV Jupiter (1961), after it sank following a collision with a freighter near Piraeus in Greece during a school trip journey. The teacher was reportedly attempting to save students during the sinking. One student from a nearby school in Streetly and two Greek seamen also died.

Demolition work at T.P Riley began towards the end of 2001 and lessons were taught in Portakabin buildings until the new school, known as Walsall Academy, was opened in September 2003.
