= Harold Parry =

British soldier and poet (1896–1917)

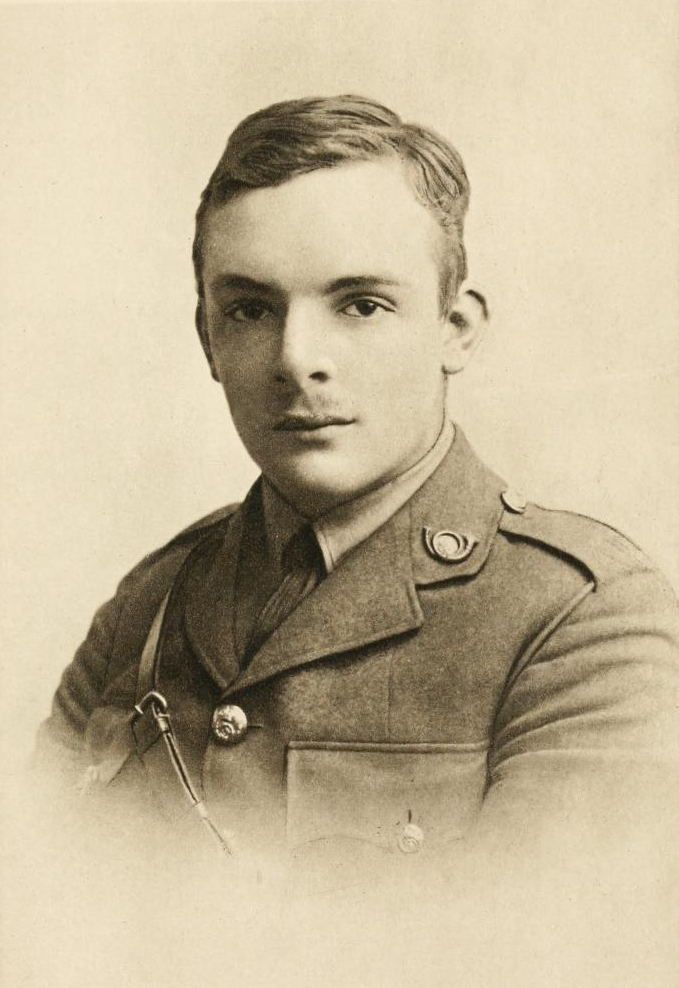
Harold Parry

Harold Parry (13 December 1896 – 6 May 1917) was an English war poet of the First World War. His poetry was published after his death in Flanders.

== Life ==
Parry was born in 1896 in Bloxwich (then in Staffordshire, now in West Midlands), one of twins; his parents were David Ebenezer Parry, a colliery owner, and wife Sarah. He won a scholarship to Queen Mary's Grammar School in Walsall, and in 1915 he won an Open History Scholarship to Exeter College, Oxford.

In January 1916 while at Oxford he volunteered for army service, and was commissioned as Second Lieutenant in the King's Own Yorkshire Light Infantry. After training at Rugeley he transferred to the 17th battalion of the King's Royal Rifle Corps. He served at the Somme in France, and in November 1916 moved with his battalion to the Ypres Salient in Flanders. He was killed on 6 May 1917, by shellfire on the Yser Canal section.

He had written poetry before the war, and his experiences at the Somme and in Flanders led to his returning to poetry. After his death, In Memoriam: Harold Parry was published, letters and poems of Parry compiled by Geoffrey Dennis. Some of his poems were published in the anthology Songs from the Heart of England (1920), edited by Alfred Moss and with a foreword by Jerome K. Jerome.

Parry is buried in Vlamertinghe Military Cemetery, in the village of Vlamertinge in West Flanders, Belgium. The headstone bears the inscription "Death is the Gate To the High Road of Life And Love is the Way (Harold Parry)".
