= Beginnings (Ambrose Slade album) =

Studio album by Ambrose Slade
- Released: 9 May 1969
- Recorded: Philips (London)
- Genre: Rock
- Length: 35:30
- Label: Fontana
- Producer: Ambrose Slade; Roger Wake

Ambrose Slade chronology
Beginnings (1969)	Play It Loud (1970)

Singles from Beginnings
- 1. "Genesis" Released: 14 May 1969

American Cover
- American version titled "Ballzy".

Beginnings is the debut album by the British rock band Ambrose Slade, who later achieved fame as Slade. It was released on 9 May 1969, but failed to enter the charts. In the US, it was released under the title Ballzy. A re-issue as Beginnings of Slade was released by Contour in 1975, but was quickly withdrawn from sale due to copyright issues.

Beginnings is a mixture of self-penned songs and cover versions including two tracks by Steppenwolf. As if to confirm the diversity of the group's influences, they also cut Ted Nugent & The Amboy Dukes' "Journey to the Centre of Your Mind", "Ain't Got No Heart" by Frank Zappa & The Mothers of Invention, the Moody Blues' "Fly Me High", Lennon and McCartney's "Martha My Dear" and "If This World Were Mine" by Marvin Gaye.

The cover artwork for the original British release of the album features a photo of the band on Pouk Hill in Walsall, a local landmark which was close to lead singer Noddy Holder's home. The band didn't enjoy the photo session due to the photographer insisting that they should pose naked from the waist up in extremely cold weather. The incident was later to form the basis of the lyrics to their song "Pouk Hill", which appeared on their second album, Play It Loud, in 1970.

The album has been included as part of John Peel's Rarest Records documentary.

== Background and release ==
Slade had originally formed as The 'N Betweens in 1966. Aside from recording the odd, unsuccessful single, the band mainly concentrated on building a reputation on the UK's live circuit. In February 1969, Jack Baverstock, the head of A&R at Philips Records, took an interest in signing the band after hearing two of their demos, recorded during 1968 sessions with producer Martin Irving. Baverstock soon offered to sign the band if they changed their name to Ambrose Slade and found London-based management. Despite their concerns of losing the reputation gained as the 'N Betweens, the band agreed. The name Ambrose Slade was inspired by Baverstock's secretary, who had named her handbag Ambrose and her shoes Slade. Baverstock soon found them an agent, John Gunnel.

The band spent a week in the Philips Studio at Stanhope Place recording Beginnings with engineer Roger Wake. Having thought the band's demo of "Mad Dog Cole" was great, Baverstock insisted the band write more material of their own. The three other originals, "Roach Daddy", "Pity The Mother" and "Genesis", were then written within days. In a 1980 interview, bassist Jim Lea recalled: "This was our first major crack at making a record, so it was all important not to let it slip. So we did "Roach Daddy", "Mad Dog Cole" and "Genesis" out of total fear. "Pity The Mother" was another one of the songs that Bavistock "forced" us to write." At a time when the band were not yet fully writing their own material, the album contained eight covers of songs the band regularly played as part of their live-set. Of the covers, Lea said: "They were all numbers that we were doing live on stage at the time. We had started to move away from the Flower Power thing then, but we were still doing unusual numbers. You can see by all the writers of the songs, they are all big names now, but at the time they were unheard of. Frank Zappa – he was totally unknown … but we recorded his "Ain't Got No Heart"."

During the recording of the album, Ambrose Slade would be introduced to Chas Chandler, who visited the band in the studio with his business partner Gunnel. Impressed by what he heard in the studio, Chandler decided to watch the band perform live at Rasputin's club the following night. By the end of the show, he decided that he wanted to manage the group and soon became the band's manager.

In May 1969, Beginnings was released, along with the single "Genesis", however both failed to chart. This was despite a promotional video being shot at London's Euston Station to promote the album. Following the lack of commercial success, the band and Chandler began considering their next career move. Having not been pleased with the debut album, Chandler thought the band would benefit from writing their own material and a change of image. The band would record two further singles for Fontana until Chandler moved the band to Polydor, where they would later achieve a commercial breakthrough in 1971.

Speaking of the album's release and lack of commercial success, Lea said: "It dropped drastically. But that wasn't the point, you see it got us the footing in London, so it was a case of mission accomplished for us. Chas Chandler took us over. We still had some time to run on our contract with Bavistock, so we released our next two singles on Fontana. There were some internal hassles between Chas and the new boss of Fontana, and the next thing that I knew was that we were out of the Fontana deal. Chas had connections with Polydor, due to when he managed Jimi Hendrix, so we signed a contract with them."

== Song information ==
"Genesis" is an original instrumental, written by all four members of the band. The song would later be re-worked, with lyrics added into the track "Know Who You Are", which appeared on the band's 1970 album Play It Loud. "Everybody's Next One" is a cover of the 1968 song by Steppenwolf. "Knocking Nails into My House" is a cover of the 1968 song by The Idle Race. "Roach Daddy" was also written by all four members of the band. In addition to its inclusion on the album, the song also featured as the B-Side on the "Genesis" single. "Ain't Got No Heart" is a cover of the 1966 song by the Mothers of Invention. "Pity the Mother" was the first song to be written by Slade's future songwriting team Holder and Lea. The song features Lea on electric violin. In 1980, Lea recalled of the song: "We wrote it in Nod's parents' kitchen, the day before we went down to do some recording in the studio. Louise [Lea's wife] was there, and she helped me and Nod write the song."

"Mad Dog Cole" is another original instrumental. The song had the working title of "My Cat's Got Fleas". "Fly Me High" is a cover of the 1967 song by the Moody Blues. "If This World Were Mine" is a cover of the 1967 duet by Marvin Gaye and Tammi Terrell. "Martha My Dear" is a cover of the 1968 song by The Beatles. The band would later perform the song on the BBC children's show Monster Music Mash in 1969 when promoting the single "Wild Winds Are Blowing". "Born to be Wild" is another song originally by Steppenwolf. "Born to be Wild" was later included on the 1972 live album Slade Alive!, which gave the band's version of the song greater recognition. "Journey to the Centre of Your Mind" is a cover of the 1968 song by The Amboy Dukes.

== Critical reception ==
Upon release, reviewer Lester Bangs of Phonograph Record described the album as "a real dud". Record Mirror, in a review of the "Genesis" single, described the album as a "fine debut" from a band of "very substantial talent".

Later in 1991, a retrospective of Beginnings by Q said: "It's an odd but pleasant album, which sees the quartet nervously relax in The Small Faces' shoes." Dave Thompson in a retrospective summary for AllMusic feels that the album presents "little of what you'd expect from Slade", although "Noddy Holder's vocals are unmistakable". Thompson praises the "well-executed covers", which served to "demonstrate the band's musical versatility". He concluded: "While there are a handful of disappointments ("Martha My Dear" is almost heinous), Beginnings stands as a fine beginning. But things were going to get a lot better than this."

== Track listing ==
Side one
No.	Title	Writer(s)	Length
1.	"Genesis"	Dave Hill, Noddy Holder, Jim Lea, Don Powell	3:16
2.	"Everybody's Next One"	John Kay, Gabriel Mekler	2:45
3.	"Knocking Nails into My House"	Jeff Lynne	2:24
4.	"Roach Daddy"	Hill, Holder, Lea, Powell	3:03
5.	"Ain't Got No Heart"	Frank Zappa	2:37
6.	"Pity the Mother"	Holder, Lea	3:57

Side two
No.	Title	Writer(s)	Length
7.	"Mad Dog Cole"	Hill, Holder, Lea, Powell	2:42
8.	"Fly Me High"	Justin Hayward	2:56
9.	"If This World Were Mine"	Marvin Gaye	3:16
10.	"Martha My Dear"	John Lennon, Paul McCartney	2:19
11.	"Born to Be Wild"	Mars Bonfire	3:24
12.	"Journey to the Centre of Your Mind"	Ted Nugent, Steve Farmer	2:46

Japanese '24 Bit remaster 2006' bonus tracks
No.	Title	Writer(s)	Length
13.	"Wild Winds Are Blowing" (non-album single)	Bob Saker, Jack Winsley	2:39
14.	"C'Mon C'Mon" (B-side of "Shape of Things to Come")	Holder	2:38

=== Track listing (Beginnings of Slade) ===
'Beginnings of Slade' album cover

No.	Title	Length
1.	"Born to Be Wild"	3:24
2.	"Genesis"	3:16
3.	"Martha My Dear"	2:19
4.	"Ain't Got No Heart"	2:37
5.	"Roach Daddy"	3:03
6.	"Everybody's Next One"	2:45
7.	"Fly Me High"	2:56
8.	"If This World Were Mine"	3:16
9.	"Pity the Mother"	3:57
10.	"Knocking Nails into My House"	2:24
11.	"Mad Dog Cole"	2:42
12.	"Journey to the Centre of Your Mind"	2:46

== Personnel ==
Ambrose Slade

- Noddy Holder – lead vocals, rhythm guitar, producer
- Dave Hill – lead guitar, producer
- Jim Lea – bass, violin, producer
- Don Powell – drums, producer

Additional personnel

- Roger Wake – producer, engineer
- Richard Stirlin – photographer
- Linda Glover – artwork
