= Leamore =

Coordinates: 52.607187°N 1.998483°W

- Suburb and ward
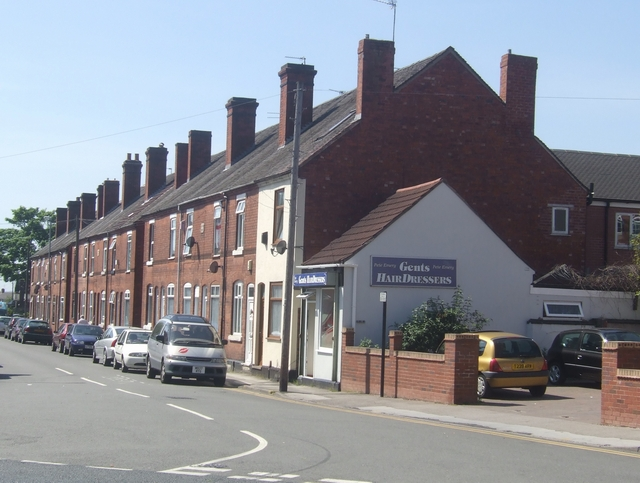
- Housing on Green Lane, Leamore, Walsall

- Location within the West Midlands
- Population: 16,024 (2021 Census with Birchills)
- OS grid reference: SJ995004
- Metropolitan borough: Walsall
- Metropolitan county: West Midlands
- Region: West Midlands
- Country: England
- Sovereign state: United Kingdom
- Post town: WALSALL
- Postcode district: WS2-3
- Dialling code: 01922
- Police: West Midlands
- Fire: West Midlands
- Ambulance: West Midlands
- UK Parliament: Walsall and Bloxwich

Leamore is a suburb of Bloxwich and Walsall in Metropolitan Borough of Walsall, West Midlands county, England. It is a mix of private and council housing built since the late 19th century. The most significant homes in the area are several multi-storey blocks of council flats, which were built in the 1960s.

== History ==
A council housing development took place around the centre of Leamore in the 1920s, and also included the opening of Somerfield Road, which gave Green Lane a direct link to Bloxwich town centre, and now forms part of the A34. A 280-flat multi-storey estate was developed in the early 1960s to replace an area previously occupied by slums; it was completed in 1964.

== Estates ==
The largest single housing development in Leamore is the Beechdale housing estate which was built by Walsall Council in the 1950s to rehouse people from the town centre slum clearances. Noddy Holder, the lead singer of Slade, grew up in Beechdale. Ball House and Leadbetter House tower blocks, situated in the north of Leamore and built during the 1960s, were demolished in late 2007 after some 40 years of dominating the local skyline.

== Transportation ==
Bloxwich Road is one of two routes running parallel through Leamore between Walsall and Bloxwich, with the other being Green Lane.
