= University of Wolverhampton =

University in Wolverhampton, England

Coordinates: 52°35′14″N 2°07′38″W

- Motto: Innovation and Opportunity
- Type: Public
- Established: 1827 - Wolverhampton Tradesmen's and Mechanics' Institute; 1926 - Wolverhampton and Staffordshire Technical College; 1950 - Wolverhampton College of Art; 1951 - Wolverhampton and Staffordshire College of Technology; 1969 - The Polytechnic, Wolverhampton; 1988 - Wolverhampton Polytechnic; 1992 - university status
- Affiliations: Million+ Universities UK
- Endowment: £77,000 (2021)
- Budget: £181.5 million (2020-21)
- Chancellor: Vacant
- Vice-Chancellor: Ebrahim Adia
- Students: 23,665 (2024/25)
- Undergraduates: 15,970 (2024/25)
- Postgraduates: 7,695 (2024/25)
- Location: Wolverhampton, England
Colours
- Website: wlv.ac.uk

The University of Wolverhampton is a public university in Wolverhampton, England, located on four campuses across the West Midlands, Shropshire and Staffordshire. Originally founded in 1827 as the Wolverhampton Tradesmen's and Mechanics' Institute, the university was subject to a series of merges, incorporations, and expansions with other local colleges, one of which occurred under the supervision of Prince George, Duke of Kent.

The university has four faculties comprising eighteen schools and institutes. It has 18,875 students and currently offers over 380 undergraduate and postgraduate courses. The city campus is located in Wolverhampton city centre, with secondary campuses at Springfield, Walsall, and Telford. There is an additional fifth campus in Wolverhampton at the University of Wolverhampton Science Park.

== History ==
=== Technical college ===
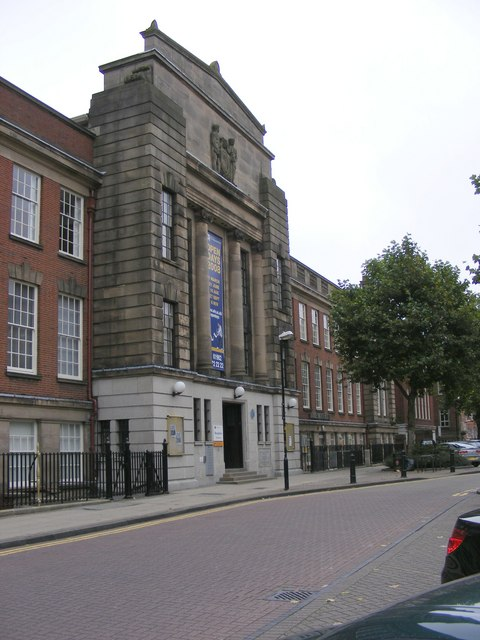
Wolverhampton and Staffordshire Technical College, now the University of Wolverhampton

The roots of the University of Wolverhampton lie in the Wolverhampton Tradesmen's and Mechanics' Institute founded in 1827 and the 19th-century growth of the Wolverhampton Free Library (1870), which developed technical, scientific, commercial and general evening classes. This grew into the Wolverhampton and Staffordshire Technical College in 1926.

In 1931, Prince George laid the foundation stone for the new Wolverhampton and Staffordshire Technical College. By 1945, the creation of the Music Department allowed the college to capitalise on the growing demand for a variety of subject areas. Enrolment in the first year totalled 135, and by 1950 HM Inspectors stated that "it was unique among technical colleges". The composer Vaughan Williams attended a performance of his Riders to the Sea in early 1950.

In 1951 it was renamed Wolverhampton and Staffordshire College of Technology and the work of the High School of Commerce was partially transferred to the college. In 1956 the Joint Education Committee of the college noted: "Research is an essential feature of any institution of higher learning. Very good work is being done in applied science, and mechanical engineering is bringing to fruition negotiation with a local firm for sponsored research into problems at heat exchangers". By 1957–58 the student numbers grew to 6,236. This included trainee teachers being enrolled into the college. Parallel developments with Wulfrun College set the foundations for the creation of the Faculty of Education created in 1977.

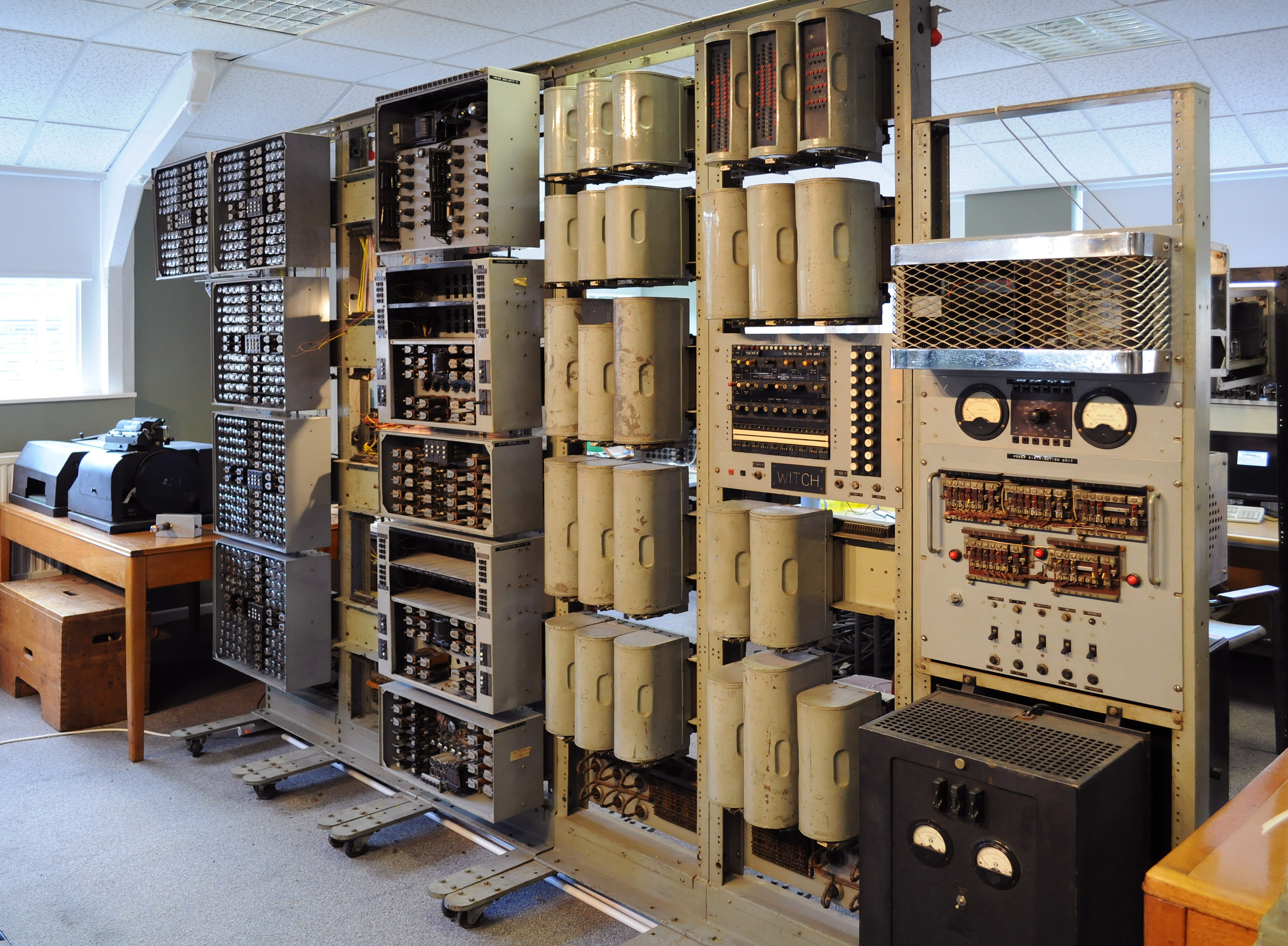
The WITCH at the National Museum of Computing, Bletchley Park, March 2010

The first computers also arrived in 1957, the WITCH (Wolverhampton Instrument for Teaching Computing from Harwell). The annual report for 1956–57 records: "Following a visit of a member of staff to Harwell, the college in competition with eight other colleges was offered the gift of an Electronic Digital Computer." A number of local firms donated sums of money to cover the cost of maintenance and operation. The WITCH is now considered to be the "oldest original functioning electronic stored program computer in the world" and from September 2009 began restoration at The National Museum of Computing, Bletchley Park.

By 1964, with the further expansion of higher education the college began to provide BA degrees with options in English, Geography, History, Music, and Economics among others. By 1965 the college was offering a degree in Computer Technology.

=== Polytechnic and gaining university status ===
The Wolverhampton School of Art was founded in 1851, becoming the Municipal School of Art in 1878, and finally Wolverhampton College of Art in 1950.

The Wolverhampton College of Technology merged with Wolverhampton College of Art in 1969 to form The Polytechnic, Wolverhampton in 1969. The formal opening ceremony took place on 14 January 1970. Wolverhampton Polytechnic was operational by the creation of five faculties; Applied Science, Art and Design, Arts, Engineering and Social Sciences. The functional units were operated by committees such as the Academic Board, Faculty Boards, Planning and Standing Committees, Committee of Deans.

1969 saw the opening of the new School of Art and Design building, designed by architects Diamond Redfern and Partners and A. Chapman (Wolverhampton council architect), and was opened by former student, Sir Charles Wheeler. Mergers with Teacher Training Colleges in Wolverhampton and Dudley in the 1970s added to the expansion of the Polytechnic, with additional growth in 1989 on Walsall Campus when the Polytechnic acquired the Teacher Training College ( West Midlands College of Higher Education ) site.

The Polytechnic changed its name to Wolverhampton Polytechnic in 1988. In 1992 the Polytechnic was granted university status and became the University of Wolverhampton.

=== Expansion years ===
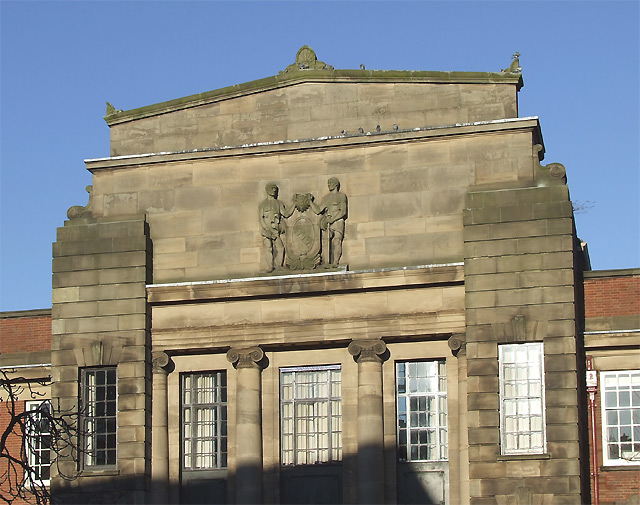
University Buildings (detail)

The university was further expanded by the construction of the Telford Campus, completed in 1994, which includes in its grounds the 18th Century, Grade II listed Priorslee Hall; the oldest building under the University of Wolverhampton's banner. Telford Campus opened its doors to students from the Business School and the Faculty of Science and Engineering.

1994 also saw Wolverhampton become the first UK university to be awarded the Charter Mark for excellence in customer service.

In 1995 the Wolverhampton Science Park opened (renamed the University of Wolverhampton Science Park in November 2012); a collaboration between the university and the local council, with its main aim being to forge links between local businesses and the university's research departments. The Science Park housed The Creative Industries Centre, The Technology Centre, The Development Centre and other business and technology support services.

Also in 1995, two local nursing colleges – the United Midlands College for Nursing and Midwifery and the Sister Dora School of Nursing – amalgamated to form the School of Nursing and Midwifery at the Walsall campus, formerly West Midlands College of Higher Education.

In 1997 the university was one of the first to establish a virtual learning environment: WOLF (Wolverhampton Online Learning Framework) a system used by students and staff to support learning in most subject areas. It provides online space for tutors to make reference materials, notes, videos and documents related to a subject available. In 2008 an upgraded version "WOLF2" was launched.

Two new learning centres were opened at the Telford and City campuses in 1998. These learning centres were a fusion of traditional libraries with high-tech facilities, aimed at providing a greater range of accessible materials for students. The following year the university opened the Arena Theatre, Wolverhampton on the City campus along with the new SC building in Telford.

=== Millennium to the present day ===
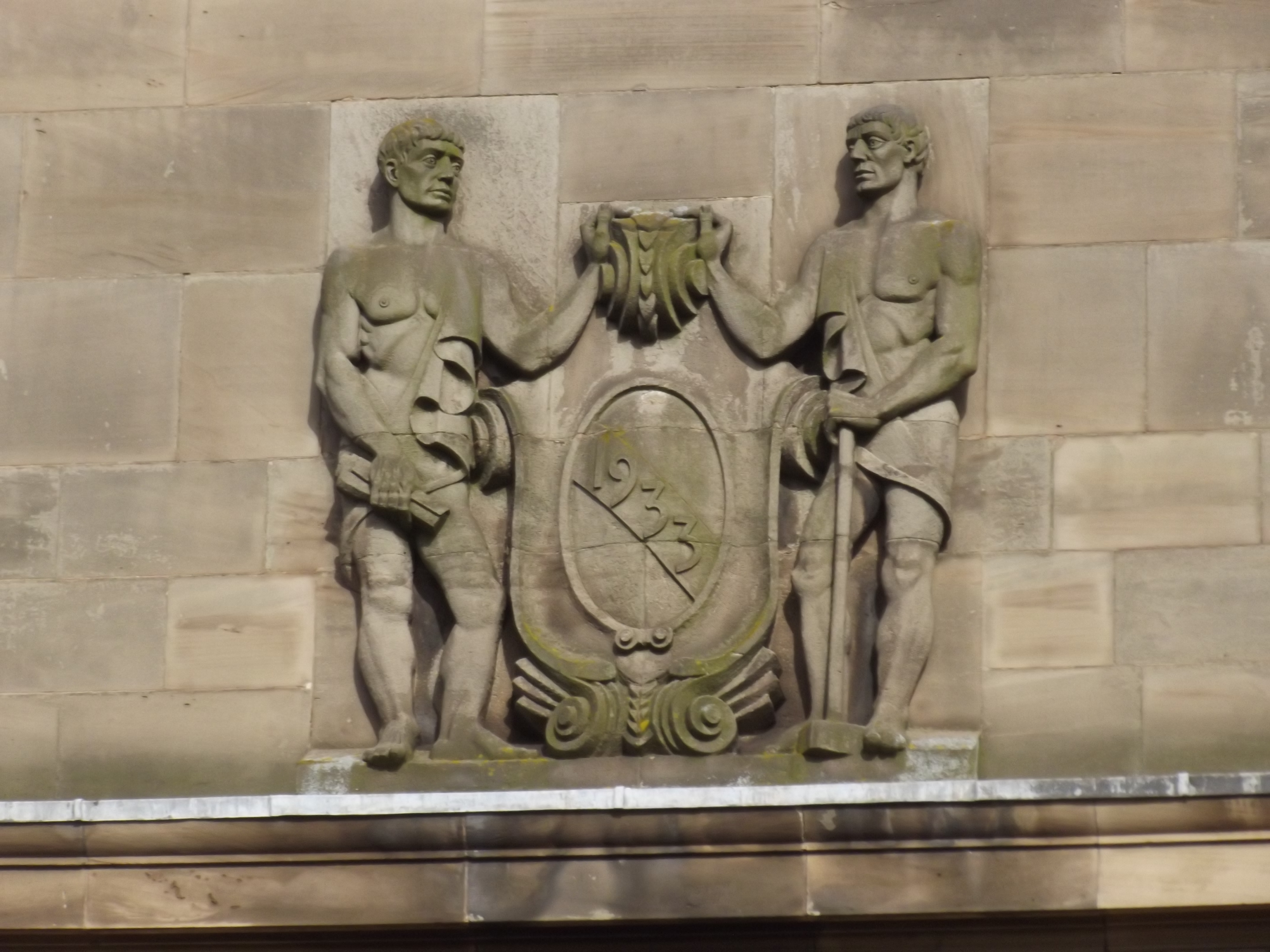
Wolverhampton University - sculpture - 1933

2000 saw the launch of a multimillion-pound refurbishment programme. From 2000 to 2010 £115 million was invested in campus developments. Highlights include the £26 million 'Millennium City' building opening by the then Chancellor of the Exchequer, Gordon Brown in February 2003.

This was followed in 2004 by a teaching building called the 'Technology Centre' (now the Alan Turing building), home of the School of Computing and IT (later to become the School of Mathematics and Computer Science). The same year a £4 million extension to the Harrison Learning Centre was completed.

In October 2005 Caroline Gipps became vice-chancellor – the university's first female vice chancellor.

In 2006 the City Campus North Administration and Teaching Building was erected, providing space for a 120-seat lecture theatre, 4 elliptical 35-seat learning pods and the bringing together of many administration departments to work all under the one roof. In 2007, a new building at Walsall Campus was established to accommodate over 1,100 students over four floors and providing a combination of specialist and open access IT facilities and office accommodation for the School of Education.

2009 saw the formation and launch of two new Schools: the School of Law, Social Sciences and Communications and the School of Health and Wellbeing, as well as the launch of the research group Centre for Developmental and Applied Research in Education (CeDARE).

The new School of Technology launched on 1 September 2010. In 2011, the university in partnership with Walsall College opened the Black Country University Technical College, one of the first University Technical Colleges in England.

Professor Geoff Layer joined the university as vice-chancellor on 1 August 2011. September 2011 saw the opening of the Performance Hub at Walsall Campus; a multimillion-pound teaching, learning, rehearsal and performance space for performing arts. Professor Layer retired from the university in 2021.

Plans for a further £45 million investment in City Campus were announced in December 2012, with redevelopments including a new Business School building opposite the Molineux Stadium. In 2013, the university celebrated its 21st anniversary since being granted university status on 17 June 1992.

In 2015, the university announced its biggest ever investment plan, 'Our Vision, Your Opportunity', to generate £250 million of investment by 2020 to enhance the student experience and help to drive economic growth in the region. Key projects include the new Rosalind Franklin Science Centre (which opened to the public in 2014), the completion of the Lord Swraj Paul Building (new home to the University of Wolverhampton Business School), £10 million investment in engineering at Telford Innovation Campus, a new courtyard and catering facilities at City Campus, and the development of the new Springfield Campus, a national centre for excellence for construction and the built environment.

In 2015, Lord Paul, the chancellor, donated £1m to the university which is the largest donation ever received.

On Wednesday 14 November 2018, the university went into partnership with the West Midlands Ambulance Service to form the UK's first University Ambulance Trust.

In May 2022, the university announced that it would stop recruiting students for 138 of its undergraduate and postgraduate courses from September of that year. This was a response to the COVID-19 pandemic, which had driven up costs and lowered student applications.

In October 2026, the Speaker of the House of Commons, Sir Lindsay Hoyle, was announced as the university's next chancellor.

== Campuses ==
The University of Wolverhampton is located across four campuses across the West Midlands and Shropshire.

=== City Campus ===
University of Wolverhampton, MA Building

City Campus is the main site for the university and is situated in Wolverhampton city centre, opposite Molineux Stadium and approximately 16 miles (26 km) from Birmingham. Divided into City Campus Wulfruna and City Campus Molineux, it is home to several academic schools/faculties; administration departments; the Students' Union and student support facilities. In addition, there are three separate Halls of Residence on this campus: North Road, Lomas Street and Randall Lines.

The Millennium City Building, opened in 2003, provides over 10,000 square metres of teaching space, a 300-seat lecture theatre, exhibition gallery, campus restaurant, and an "informal Social Learning Space".

The Alan Turing Building contains an open plan workspace, as well as prototyping equipment and software packages for 3D modelling and product design. The Centre includes a TV studio with greenscreen capability, a radio studio, Newsroom and digital editing suites.

The Harrison Learning Centre has traditional and electronic-based library facilities over four floors. It provides electronic auto-service and online cataloguing facilities, and academic librarians manage, monitor and update the available information.

=== George Wallis Building ===
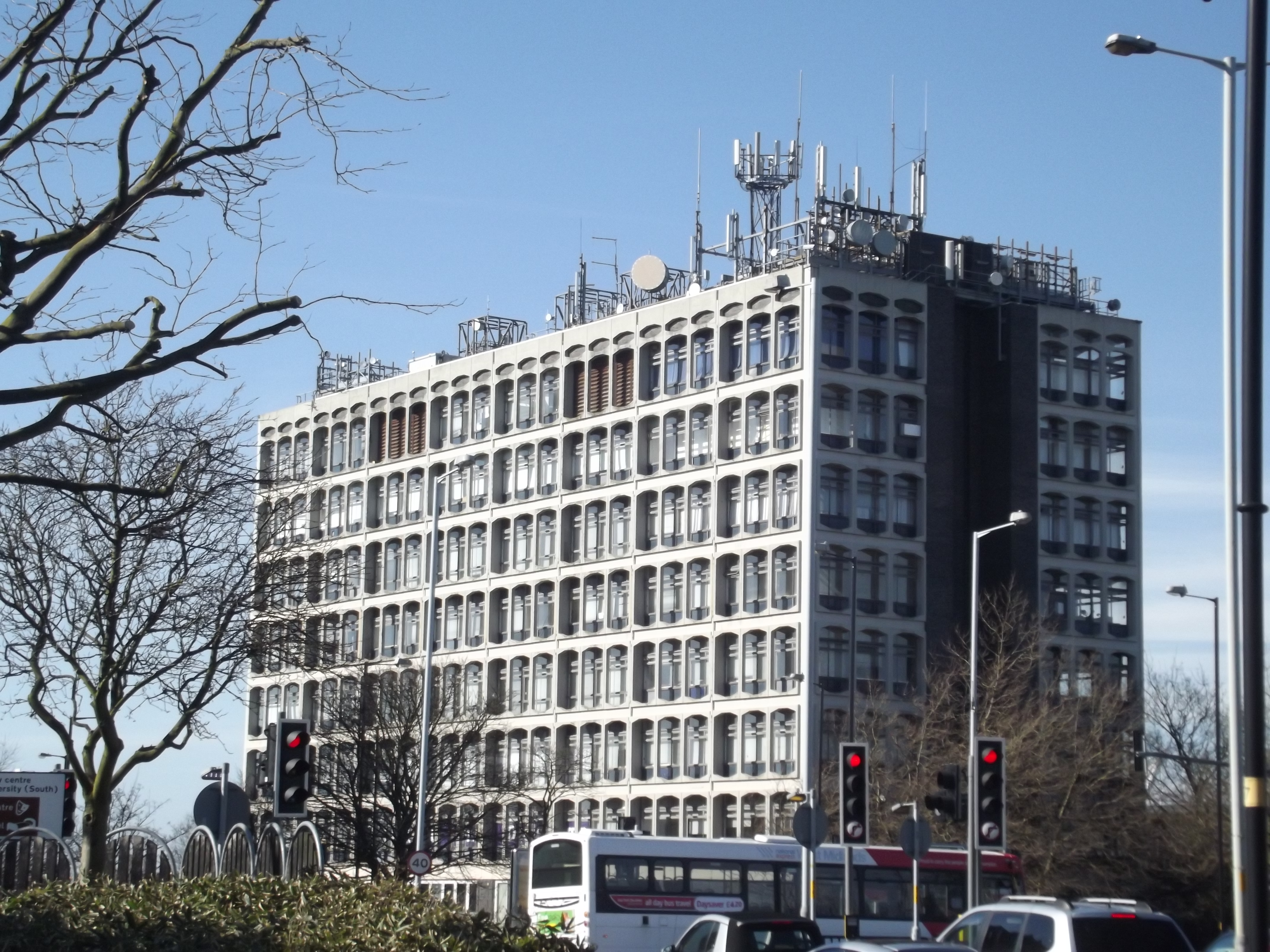
The Grade II listed George Wallis Building

The Wolverhampton School of Art is housed in the nine-storey Brutalist George Wallis Building, which was formally opened by Sir Charles Wheeler in 1970. It provides specialist equipment, facilities and expertise for students studying one of the various art and design specialisms available to study at the School of Art.

==== Grade II Listing Status ====
On 16 December 2025, the George Wallis Building was granted Grade II listed status by the Department for Culture, Media and Sport (DCMS), following advice from Historic England. The designation affords the structure legal protection as a site of special architectural or historic interest and effectively prevented its planned demolition. The decision followed a sustained campaign by heritage organisations, notably the Twentieth Century Society, which submitted the original listing application, alongside a public petition that attracted thousands of signatures.

The 1960s Brutalist building, overlooking Wolverhampton's inner ring road, had previously been earmarked for demolition as part of the University of Wolverhampton's proposals for a "radical" overhaul of its estate announced earlier in the year. Under these plans, the art school would have been removed and the site redeveloped on the advice of external university consultants.

Historic England's recommendation for listing cited the building's dual significance. This included its association with the British Black Art movement, particularly its role as the host venue for the First National Black Art Convention in 1982, as well as its architectural importance as a "striking" example of post-war Brutalist design. The organisation described the structure as an "emblem on the skyline of the city", highlighting its visual prominence and sculptural concrete form.

Opponents of demolition argued that the building possessed "abundant potential" for adaptive reuse and retrofitting, and that redevelopment proposals failed to adequately account for its cultural, architectural and environmental value.

=== Arena Theatre ===
The Arena Theatre contains an auditorium seating 150, a studio seating 100 and a seminar room for up to 50 people. Its programme includes professional companies, celebrating drama, dance and music, as well as showcasing work by local schools, colleges, students, amateur companies and community events.

=== Telford Innovation Campus ===
The Telford Innovation Campus opened in 1994. 18 miles (29 km) from Wolverhampton and 26 miles (42 km) from Birmingham, the campus is on a greenfield site in the grounds of Priorslee Hall – a grade-II listed 18th Century redbrick mansion.

The campus houses facilities for engineering, built environment, business, computing and social work. Halls of residence for nearly 500 students are located on campus.

The campus is home to the e-Innovation Centre which provides startup companies and small and medium enterprises with business accommodation and funded support from a team of IT consultants, giving them access to the university's IT facilities, expertise and resources. It has hi-tech meeting rooms, social meeting areas, "hot-desking" provision, fully furnished offices, "incubation" units, and "grow-on" space for businesses who need to expand.

=== Walsall Campus ===
The Performance Hub

The Walsall Campus is based a mile from Walsall town centre. Students studying sport, music, dance, education, health, events management, tourism and hospitality are based here. Opened in 2005, the Student Village provides accommodation for over 300 students.

The campus has a teaching building with three lecture theatres and specialist teaching rooms. It's also home to the Institute for Learning Enhancement. Facilities at Boundary House allow trainee nurses and other healthcare professionals to follow the academic part of their course. The Performance Hub houses performing arts facilities and opened in September 2011.

The Walsall Campus Sports Centre was named as an official training base for the London 2012 Summer Olympics. It hosts training facilities for the Olympic sports of Basketball, Judo and Taekwondo. The campus hosts a judo Centre of Excellence in England by the British Judo Association which opened in September 2013.

=== Springfield Campus ===
The Springfield Campus was opened on October 31, 2021, serving as the university's main campus for its RIBA certified School of Architecture and Built Environment. The campus building was originally a 12-acre Grade II-listed brewery established in 1873 by William Butler through his company William Butler & Co. Ltd, which ceased operations in 1990, leaving the building abandoned and ultimately damaged in a fire in 2004.

The university bought the damaged property and redeveloped the building into a new £40 million school campus. The new campus was designed by Birmingham-based architecture firm Associated Architects, which won the 2023 RIBA West Midlands Award for its design.

=== University of Wolverhampton Science Park ===
The University of Wolverhampton Science Park is home to around 80 businesses working in science, technology, knowledge-based and creative sectors. As well as business support services, it offers office accommodation and workshop/laboratory areas for companies, as well as conference and meeting facilities. The Science Park was formed in 1993 as a joint venture between the University of Wolverhampton and Wolverhampton City Council.

.

== Organisation and governance ==
Coat of arms of the University of Wolverhampton

=== Faculties ===
The university has three faculties, 22 academic schools/institutes, 14 research institutes and centres, and a range of other departments.

=== Coat of arms ===
The university's arms show supporters on either side of the shield. These represent Lady Wulfrun often regarded as the founder of what is now the City of Wolverhampton in CE circa 980 (a settlement described as Wulfruna's Heantun in the Saxon Chronicles) and Thomas Telford, the engineer who, in 1787 became surveyor of public works for Shropshire, and whose works and structures can be seen across the region and the nation and after whom the Shropshire New Town was named.

The motto of the university is "Innovation and Opportunity".

=== Governance ===
The University of Wolverhampton is led by the Board of Governors and Offices of the Vice-Chancellor.

The honorary position of chancellor is the figurehead of the university and presides over the university's ceremonial occasions and acts as its ambassador. The role of chancellor was created following the grant of university title in 1992.

The Board of Governors is responsible for the oversight of the university's activities and for the effective and efficient use of resources and the safeguarding of assets. It has 18 members including nine independent members and a representative of the student body. Its chair is CEO of the Midcounties Co-operative group Ben Reid.

The Offices of the Vice-Chancellor has responsibility for the overall management of the university. The Offices of the Vice-Chancellor are led by the vice-chancellor assisted by three deputy vice-chancellors, the university registrar and secretary, and finance director. The Offices of the Vice-Chancellor are also responsible for implementing corporate strategy and operational policy decisions from the Academic Board and the Board of Governors.

Each academic school/faculty is managed by a dean aided by associate deans. The academic provision in the schools is supported by support departments each managed by a head or director.

Wolverhampton's former chancellor is Lord Paul of Marylebone, and its current vice-chancellor is Ebrahim Adia who took up the position in 2023.

== Academic profile ==
=== Research ===
The Higher Education Funding Council for England (HEFCE) announced a 1,290% increase in funding allocation for Wolverhampton's Quality Research (QR). The QR allocation of £1.905 million for Wolverhampton was the highest amount for a new university in the West Midlands.

The university achieved its best ever results in the most recent Research Excellence Framework (REF) in 2014, with all Research Centres that submitted rated as having 'world-leading' elements.

The mathematicians and information scientists in the Statistical Cybermetrics Research Group were rated world number 1 for research quality in the 2017 Shanghai Rankings for Library and Information Science.

=== Reputation and rankings ===
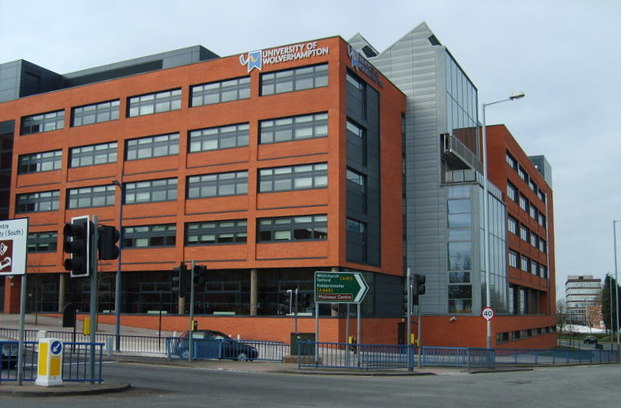
University of Wolverhampton City Campus

Rankings
National rankings
- Complete (2027): 101
- Guardian (2027): 67
- Times / Sunday Times (2027): 104

Global rankings
- QS (2027): 1001–1200
- THE (2026): 801–1000

The university is noted for its success in encouraging wider participation in higher education. The university draws two-thirds of its students from the West Midlands, and has about 2500 international students.

Between 2005 and 2009 five staff were awarded National Teaching Fellowships.

In May 2008 the university was awarded seven Knowledge Transfer Partnerships, securing its top position in the West Midlands. In September 2009 it was awarded £24.3 million for knowledge transfer, bringing it to 2nd place nationally for the number of KTPs it runs. The university will lead a consortium of all 12 of the universities in its region to increase the number of partnerships from 70 to 210 over the next three years.

In June 2013, a university team won a Times Higher Education Leadership and Management Award (THELMA) in the category of Knowledge Exchange/Transfer Initiative of the Year for its "one-stop shop" approach to promoting services to businesses.

In May 2016, the university was awarded 'Business of the Year' at the Express & Star Business Awards, where its contribution to the region's economy was hailed as 'truly outstanding'.

In the English Social Mobility Index published by the Higher Education Policy Institute, the university ranked 3rd in England in both 2024 and 2025.

In May 2026, in the Whatuni Student Choice Awards, the university was ranked 10th in the UK University of the Year category, 1st in the West Midlands regional category, and 4th for university halls.

In June 2026, the university received an overall five-star rating in the QS Stars university rating system, receiving the highest overall classification.

=== Criticism ===
==== Staff issues ====
In 1998, Ian Connell, a lecturer in television and media, left the university after being found guilty of academic misconduct. A few weeks later he committed suicide, apparently depressed by his situation.

In 2009 the university Executive announced that the university was in financial difficulties, needing to make savings of £8 million. This followed reports in the media that it had understated student non-completion rates to HEFCE. The university announced it was taking steps to reduce expenditure on staff pay and launched a voluntary redundancy exercise on 1 October 2009. This concluded with the loss of 150 posts through voluntary redundancy.

In 2015, despite 2014 REF successes, the Vice Chancellor announced that four areas of research would be cut back and some professors selected for compulsory redundancy while all professors would be subject to more rigorous annual appraisal which would lead to demotion to senior lecturer in three years if they failed to sustain their target levels of outputs, income and PhD students.

== Student life ==
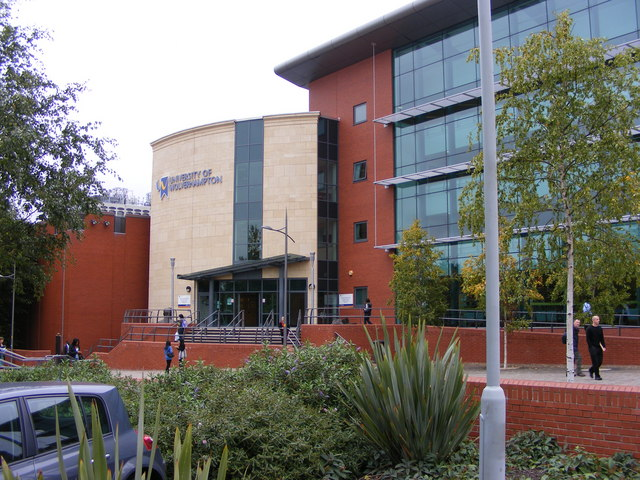
University of Wolverhampton Library

=== Students' Union ===
The University of Wolverhampton Students' Union (UWSU) is a charity led by a team consisting of 4 full-time Officers (currently the positions are Union Affairs, Academic, Community and Diversity Officers) and part-time Officers. These posts are elected annually in cross-campus elections. UWSU is primarily based in City (Wolverhampton) in the Ambika Paul Building and the WS Building in Walsall.

UWSU has over 60 societies, based on student interests. These societies are set up and run by students, with support from the Union.

=== Student accommodation ===
The university offers over 1600 places in Halls of Residence across three campuses, including over 1000 rooms with en-suite facilities.

=== Links with business and industry ===
Students also have a variety of opportunities to gain work experience while they are studying and on graduation. These include graduate placements such as Knowledge Transfer Partnerships (KTP). The university is leading on the £5.2M national Student Placements for Entrepreneurs in Education West Midlands (SPEED WM) project involving 13 UK universities, to help students create their own businesses whilst they are studying. 'Erasmus for Young Entrepreneurs' is aimed at helping new entrepreneurs to acquire relevant skills for managing a small or medium-sized enterprise by spending time working in another EU country with an experienced entrepreneur in his/her company. And SP/ARK provides facilities, accommodation, training and mentoring for business start-ups and freelancers in new media and design.

In 2013 the university won a Times Higher Education Leadership and Management Award for Knowledge Exchange/Transfer Initiative of the Year.

== Academies and school links ==
In April 2012 the university established the University of Wolverhampton Multi Academy Trust. The trust sponsors a number of schools in the West Midlands including University of Wolverhampton Wednesfield Academy and Health Futures UTC.

== Notable people ==
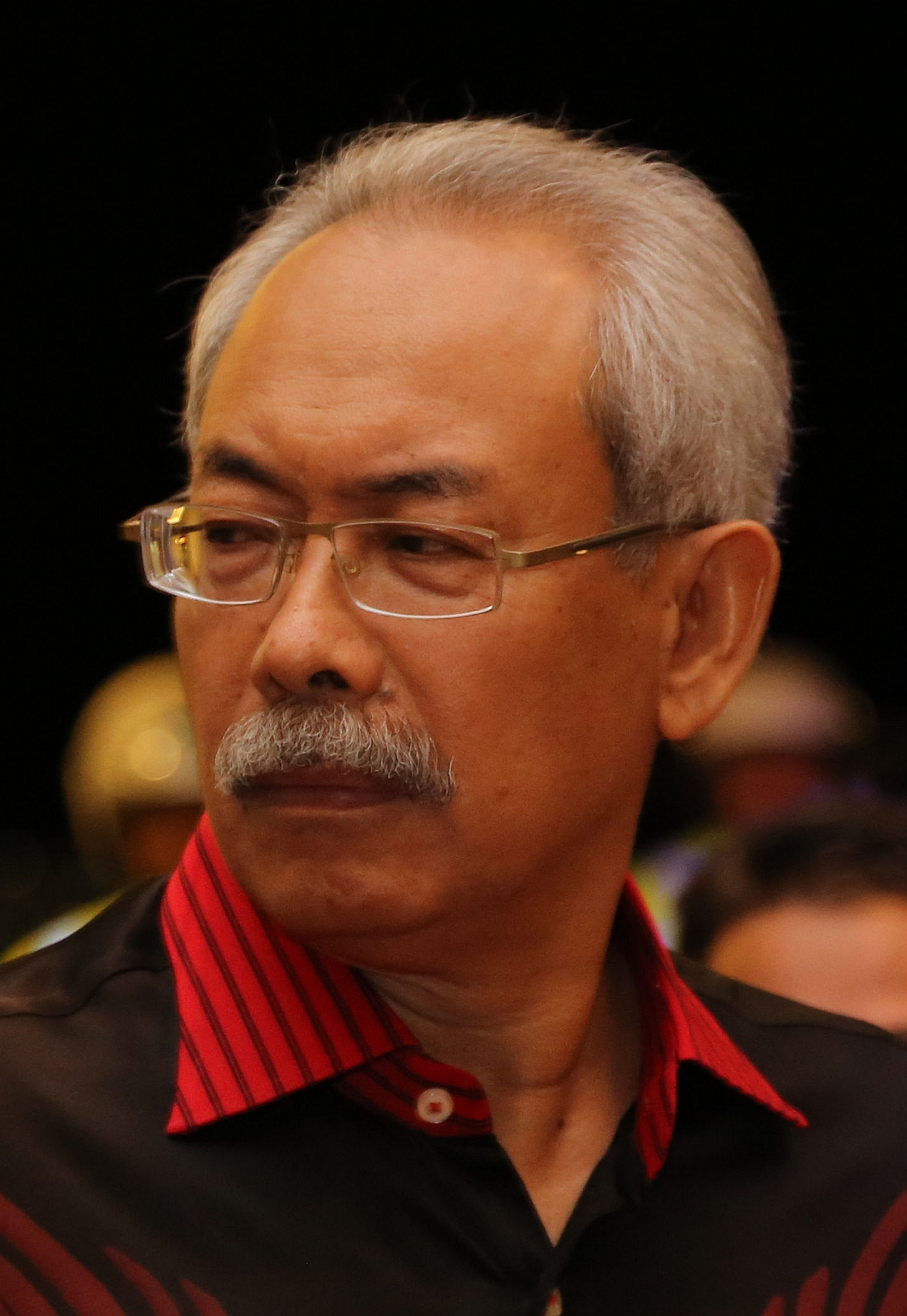
Juhar Mahiruddin

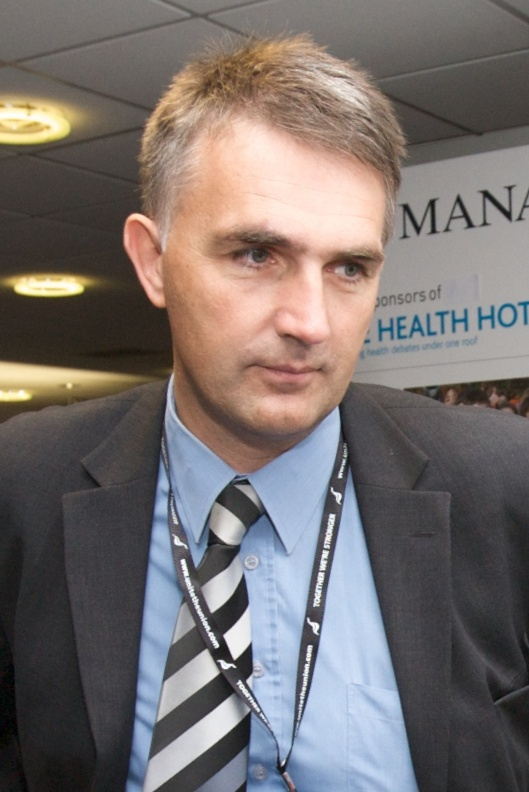
Michael John Foster

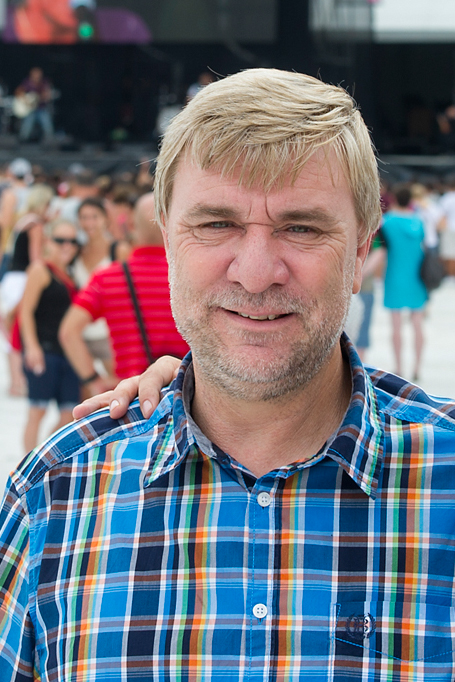
Steven Linares

=== Notable alumni ===
Notable alumni in the field of government and politics include: 161st Mayor of Wolverhampton, Claire Darke; Steven Linares, MP in the Gibraltar Parliament; Nando Bodha, former Minister of Tourism & Leisure and former Minister of Agriculture of Mauritius; Juhar Mahiruddin, Governor of Sabah, Malaysia, and Chancellor of University Malaysia Sabah; Michael John Foster, former Labour MP; David Wright, former Labour MP; Chris Heaton-Harris, Conservative MP; Brian Jenkins, former Labour MP; Jenny Jones, former Labour MP; Ken Purchase, former Labour MP; Chauhdry Abdul Rashid, former Lord Mayor of Birmingham and former Chancellor of Birmingham City University; Bill Etheridge, former UKIP MEP.

Other notable alumni include: Sir Terence Beckett, former director-general of the Confederation of British Industry; Sir Charles Wheeler, sculptor and President of the Royal Academy; Suzi Perry, television presenter and journalist; Maggie Gee, novelist; Trevor Beattie, advertising executive; Peter Bebb, special effect artist; Vernie Bennett, singer, formerly of Eternal; Scott Boswell, former professional cricketer; David Carruthers, Professor Paul Gough, Vice-Chancellor, Arts University Bournemouth, and Chair of UKADIA,; Major Peter Cottrell, soldier, author and military historian; academic, artist and disability rights activist Paul Darke; Matt Hayes, television angler; Tanwir Ikram, Deputy Senior District Judge; Mil Millington, director & filmmaker; Richard Duncan, author and philanthropist; Michael Cumming, author; Magnus Mills, author; Mark O'Shea, zoologist and television presenter; Cornelia Parker, artist/sculptor; Julian Peedle-Calloo, television presenter; Robert Priseman, artist; Anne Schwegmann-Fielding, artist; Michael Salu, graphic artist and creative director; Ged Simmons, television actor; Gillian Small, University Dean for Research, City University of New York; Clare Teal, jazz singer and broadcaster; Andrew White, writer and TV presenter; Andy Thompson, footballer; Patrick Trollope, editor of UK's first online-only regional newspaper; Annemarie Wright, artist; Adesua Etomi, actress; Tim Dutton, actor; and Kevin McCauley, English professional boxer.

=== Notable academics ===
Notable academics include the broadcaster and journalist Jeff Randall; sculptor Sir Anish Kapoor; artist Roy Ascott; author Howard Jacobson; and Sir Alan Tuckett, specialist in adult education.

== See also ==
- Armorial of UK universities
- List of universities in the UK
- Post-1992 universities
