= Arthur Tolcher =

Arthur Tolcher (9 April 1922 – 9 March 1987), born Arthur John Stone-Tolcher in Bloxwich, Staffordshire, England, was a virtuoso British harmonica player and child star who started his career in the British music halls in the 1930s.

== Career ==
He appeared at the London Palladium at 15 and was an early friend and colleague of Morecambe and Wise. Tolcher was managed by his mother Beatrice ("Beef"), who knew Eric Morecambe's mother well. When the double act became successful, Eric and Ernie did not forget their friend and he appeared for many years in their TV shows. He would come on stage in evening wear and start to play his harmonica (always "España cañí/Spanish Gypsy Dance"), only to be stopped by Eric and Ernie saying, "Not now, Arthur!" He also played in some longer sketches on their show.

In a BBC Radio 4 programme in August 2007, Tolcher's life story was narrated by Stewart Henderson. Although he had applied to work for the BBC many times in the 1950s, he was dismissed as "amateurish". This did not stop him from performing many backing tracks on hit records for singers such as Frank Ifield.

== Personal life ==
Tolcher often worked away from home, but his home was in Bloxwich, in the West Midlands, for many years.

Tolcher, who was a lifelong and devout Roman Catholic, died in March 1987 aged 64.
