= Bill Dolman =

English footballer

Personal information
- Full name: Humphrey William Dolman
- Date of birth: 30 August 1906
- Place of birth: Bloxwich, England
- Date of death: 1964 (aged 57–58)
- Height: 5 ft 11 1/2 in (1.82 m)
- Position: Goalkeeper

Senior career*
Years	Team	Apps	(Gls)
1925–1926	Blakenhall Congregationals		
1926–1927	Bloxwich		
1927–1929	Willenhall		
1929–1933	Chesterfield	103	(0)
1933–1936	Bristol City	61	(0)
1936–1938	Luton Town	62	(0)
1939	Chelmsford City	12	(0)
- * Club domestic league appearances and goals

Humphrey William Dolman (30 August 1906 — 1964) was an English footballer who played as a goalkeeper.

== Career ==
Dolman began his career in 1925, playing for the Blakenhall Congregationals. A year later, Dolman signed for hometown club Bloxwich, before joining Willenhall a year later. In February 1929, Dolman signed for Football League club Chesterfield. In the 1930–31 season, Dolman played every game for Chesterfield as the club won the Third Division North. In 1933, Dolman left Chesterfield following the signing of Jack Moody, signing for Bristol City. Dolman played for Bristol City for three years, signing for Luton Town in 1936 and helping the club win the 1936–37 Third Division South. Dolman lost his place in the Luton line-up in November 1938, signing for Chelmsford City briefly in March 1939, before the outbreak of World War II.
