= Ben Reid (cooperativist) =

British businessman

- Occupation: Businessman
- Known for: Chief executive of Midcounties Co-operative
- Awards: OBE

Ben Reid is a member of the board of directors of International Cooperative Alliance and former CEO of Midcounties Co-operative.

== Career ==
He began his career as an employee in a small co-operative in Ilkeston. He moved to Walsall in 1988, when he was appointed deputy chief executive of West Midlands Co-op. He became chief executive in 1992. In 2005 West Midlands merged with the Oxford, Swindon and Gloucester Society to become Midcounties Cooperative.

Midcounties grew into the UK's largest independent co-operative and expanded into childcare, travel, healthcare and energy. The society was also an early supporter of the Fair Tax Mark and also served as the chair of Cooperatives UK.

Reid was appointed an OBE for his work in the co-operative movement. From 2000, he was also a director of the Co-operative Group. During the group's governance crisis in 2014, he was seen as a leading figure among the "traditionalists" who opposed its proposed restructuring. He resigned from the board later that year, after members voted for governance reforms.

He was later elected to the board of the International Co-operative Alliance.

In 2018, Reid was appointed Chair of Shrewsbury and Telford Hospital NHS Trust, and in 2019 Chair of the University of Wolverhampton.
