= Walsall and Bloxwich =

UK Parliament constituency (since 2024)

- Borough constituency for the House of Commons
- Boundary of Walsall and Bloxwich in West Midlands region
- County: West Midlands
- Major settlements: Walsall and Bloxwich

Current constituency
- Created: 2024
- Member of Parliament: Valerie Vaz (Labour)
- Seats: One
- Created from: Walsall North and Walsall South

Walsall and Bloxwich is a constituency of the House of Commons in the UK Parliament. Further to the completion of the 2023 Periodic Review of Westminster constituencies, it was first contested at the 2024 general election. The constituency is currently held by Valerie Vaz of the Labour Party. Before the boundary changes came into effect, Vaz held the former Walsall South constituency from 2010 to 2024.

The constituency has a high Muslim population. In the 2021 census, 23% of constituents said they were Muslim.

== Constituency profile ==
Walsall

Walsall and Bloxwich is a constituency in the West Midlands county of England, covering the towns of Walsall and Bloxwich.

Walsall and Bloxwich are neighbouring towns located within the Black Country, a geographic and cultural area of connected towns between Birmingham and Wolverhampton. This area is regarded as one of the birthplaces of the Industrial Revolution and the two towns have a history of coal mining and the manufacture of metal products like chains, blades and buckles. This constituency is one of the most deprived in the country; there are some wealthier suburbs in the east of Walsall, but both towns suffered from the deindustrialisation of the late 20th century and contain some of the country's poorest neighbourhoods. Most residents live in terraced or semi-detached properties, around a third of which are socially-rented. House prices here are lower than the rest of the West Midlands region and the average price is around half the overall UK average.

Walsall and Bloxwich has a younger-than-average population with a low proportion of retirees. Residents have low levels of income and homeownership. Figures from 2025 show that 42% of children here live in relative poverty, more than double the UK-wide rate. Residents have very low levels of education and a high proportion work in the health, business administration and transport sectors. The percentage of residents claiming unemployment benefits is double the national rate. White people made up 59% of the population at the 2021 census. Asians, mostly of Pakistani or Indian Sikh origin, were the largest ethnic minority group at 29%. Black people were 7% of residents. Walsall and Bloxwich have distinct demographic makeups; Asians were approximately half the population in Walsall in 2021 whereas Bloxwich was around 90% White.

At the local borough council, Walsall is represented by local independents whilst Bloxwich elected Reform UK councillors. Voters in this constituency strongly supported leaving the European Union in the 2016 referendum; an estimated 65% voted in favour of Brexit compared to the UK-wide figure of 52%.

== Boundaries ==
The constituency is composed of the following (as they existed on 1 December 2020):

- The Metropolitan Borough of Walsall wards of: Birchills Leamore; Blakenall; Bloxwich East; Bloxwich West; Paddock (polling districts UA, UB, UC and UD); Palfrey; Pleck; St. Matthew’s.

It is formed from the majority of both the abolished Walsall North and Walsall South seats. It comprises the following areas:

- the Birchills, Leamore, Blakenall and the two Bloxwich wards from Walsall North
- the Palfrey, Pleck, St. Matthew's (Walsall town centre) wards and part of the Paddock ward from Walsall South

== Elections ==
=== Elections in the 2020s ===
General election 2024: Walsall and Bloxwich (Note: Sources such as the BBC describe the 2024 election result as a Labour gain from Conservative, based on notional results had the 2024 constituency boundaries been in place in the 2019 general election.)
Party	Candidate	Votes	%	±%
Labour	Valerie Vaz	12,514	33.5	−10.8
Independent	Aftab Nawaz	7,600	20.4	N/A
Reform	Elaine Williams	7,293	19.5	+18.3
Conservative	Shannon Lloyd	6,679	17.9	−31.2
Green	Sadat Hussain	2,288	6.1	+4.7
Liberal Democrats	Patrick Stillman	817	2.2	−0.7
Majority		4,914	13.2	
Rejected ballots		141	0.4	
Turnout		37,191	49.6	
Registered electors		74,951		
Labour win (new seat)				
