= Sandwell Academy =

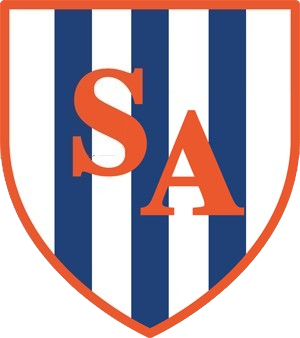

Location
- Halfords Lane; West Bromwich, West Midlands, B71 4LG; England; 52.50837°N 1.96713°W

Information
- Type: Academy
- Established: 2006
- Department for Education URN: 134993 Tables
- Ofsted: Reports
- Headteacher: James Saunders
- Gender: Coeducational
- Age: 11 to 18
- Website: https://sandwellacademy.com/

Sandwell Academy is a secondary school and sixth form with academy status located in West Bromwich in the West Midlands, England.

== School ==
The school opened in 2006 and has since opened a new, on-site building with various fitness, IT and classroom facilities.

The school is sponsored by the Worshipful Company of Mercers, Thomas Telford School, HSBC Education Trust, Tarmac Group and West Bromwich Albion F.C. The school has specialisms in Sport and Business Enterprise and has additional facilities to support the specialisms.

Sandwell Academy operates a wide catchment area which includes all of West Bromwich and the entirety of Sandwell. The school achieved an "Outstanding" rating in its most recent Ofsted inspection (2014). Notable former pupils include Jerome Sinclair, Joe Fraser and Morgan Rogers.

On the 1 February 2016, a bomb threat call was sent to the secondary school which led to the evacuation of all the pupils though it did later turn out to be hoax call as apart of mass bomb threats across Birmingham and the Black Country which spanned over 2 weeks.
