= Walsall Academy =

Coordinates: 52.6236°N 1.9989°W

- Bloxwich; Walsall, West Midlands; England

Information
- Type: Academy
- Established: 2003
- Department for Education URN: 133697 Tables
- Ofsted: Reports
- Gender: Co-educational
- Enrolment: 1,287
- Colours: Purple and gold (Mercers' colours)

Walsall Academy is a secondary school based in Bloxwich, Walsall, West Midlands, England.

== History ==
It opened in January 2003 with 470 students on the roll, and after four years that figure had increased to 1,050 – making it one of the most populated secondary schools in Walsall.

Built on the site of the former T. P. Riley Comprehensive School, it cost £23 million. A number of the teachers were carried over from T.P Riley School, while others were new recruits and a few were transferred from Thomas Telford School.

As with Thomas Telford School, demand for places is high. In its first year of opening, there were 421 applicants for the 168 (raised to 192 due to demand) places on offer for Year 7 students. The number was subsequently reduced back to 168.

== Awards and recognition ==
In 2009, it was the fifth-highest-ranking secondary school overall (and the second-highest-ranking state comprehensive) in the borough with 61% of GCSE students gaining 5 A*-C grades.

== Former headteachers ==
The headteachers of the school from its time of opening are:

- Jean Hickman - 2003-2009
- Vivienne Evans - 2009-2015
- Simon Rogers - 2015-2023
- Simon Topper - 2023–present
