= Birchills =

Coordinates: 52.592470°N 1.999059°W

- Suburb and ward
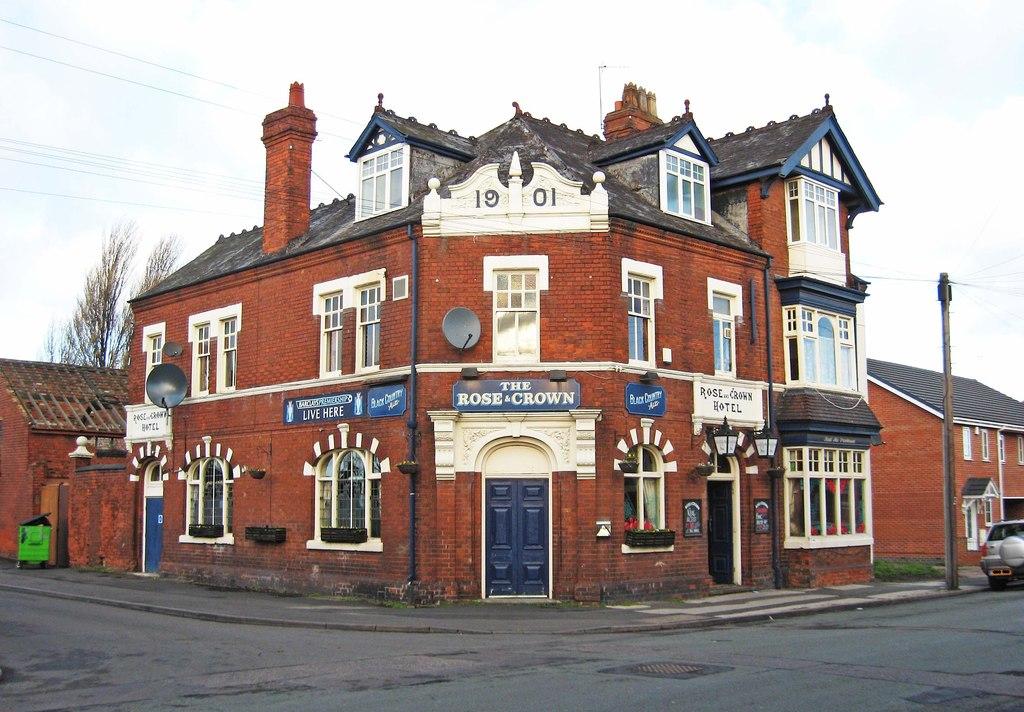
- The Rose and Crown Pub, Old Birchills, Walsall

- Location within the West Midlands
- Population: 16,024 (2021 Census)
- OS grid reference: SP004993
- Metropolitan borough: Walsall
- Metropolitan county: West Midlands
- Region: West Midlands
- Country: England
- Sovereign state: United Kingdom
- Post town: WALSALL
- Postcode district: WS2
- Dialling code: 01922
- Police: West Midlands
- Fire: West Midlands
- Ambulance: West Midlands
- UK Parliament: Walsall and Bloxwich

Birchills is a residential area of Walsall in the West Midlands of England. The appropriate Walsall ward is Birchills Leamore. The population of this ward taken at the 2011 census was 14,775.

== Geography ==
It is situated several hundred yards west of the town centre and is an established area containing many different housing types, though Victorian/Edwardian terraced houses and inter-war council houses are the most frequent type.

== Amenities ==
Reedswood Park is located in Birchills, as is Pouk Hill - a hill which inspired a 1970s Slade song.

== Demographics ==
At the 2021 census, the ward profile population was 16,024 which includes the nearby suburb of Leamore. Of the findings, the ethnicity and religious composition of the ward was:

Birchills Leamore: Ethnicity: 2021 Census
Ethnic group	Population	%
White	11,444	71.4%
Asian or Asian British	2,631	16.4%
Black or Black British	1,138	7.1%
Mixed	543	3.4%
Other Ethnic Group	251	1.6%
Arab	18	0.4%
Total	16,024	100%

The religious composition of the ward at the 2021 Census was recorded as:

Birchills Leamore: Religion: 2021 Census
Religious	Population	%
Christian	6,918	45.5%
Irreligious	5,488	36.1%
Muslim	2,102	13.8%
Sikh	421	2.8%
Hindu	144	0.9%
Other religion	92	0.6%
Buddhist	32	0.4%
Jewish	6	0.2%
Total	16,024	100%

== Transportation ==
Birchills formerly was served by Birchills railway station which was on the Chase Line but closed in the 1930s.

== Estates ==
Several tower blocks, built during the 1960s, are situated in the east of Birchills, near Walsall town centre. Murderer Raymond Leslie Morris was living in one of these flats with his wife at the time of his arrest on 4 November 1967.

== Birchills Power Station ==
A power station was opened in the north of Birchills in 1949, just a few years before the Beechdale council estate was developed at the far side. This power station served the Walsall area for 33 years until its closure in October 1982, although it was not demolished until March 1987. The site of the power station was redeveloped for housing and commerce during the 1990s.
