= Walsall College =

Location
- Littleton Street West; Walsall, West Midlands, WS2 8ES; England; 52.5871°N 1.98324°W

Information
- Type: Further education college
- Motto: Bringing Talent To Life
- Established: 1993
- Local authority: Walsall
- Department for Education URN: 130483 Tables
- Ofsted: Reports
- Chair: Allan Pinnegar
- Principal & Chief Executive: Jatinder Sharma
- Gender: Coeducational
- Age: 14+
- Website: www.walsallcollege.ac.uk

Walsall College is a further education college in Walsall, West Midlands, England.

The college is the largest provider of qualifications for 14- to 19-year-olds in the Borough of Walsall. In addition, Walsall College provides education and training for adults, delivered both at the college campuses and on-site at workplaces and community centres. Campuses of the college include the main Wisemore Campus, and the Green Lane campus which offers engineering and construction courses. The original Walsall town centre site is now occupied by Tesco who did a land swap deal which saw the college relocate to its present site on land owned by Tesco and the intended site of its new store.

Courses offered by the college include GCSEs, NVQs, BTECs, Diplomas, Apprenticeships and Access courses. Walsall College's sixth form department, V6 is a vocational sixth form for young people focussing on vocational skills and qualification; however it does not offer A Levels or academic study.

Walsall College also offers its vocational courses through a series of academies, in partnership with businesses including Microsoft, Apple, Francesco Group and Roland DG. The academies include a gym, hair and beauty salon and restaurant. All facilities are staffed by students.

In March 2013 Walsall College achieved an overall Outstanding grade in an OFSTED inspection, in doing so became the first College of its size in the UK to achieve this grading under the new OFSTED framework.

In March 2018, Walsall College merged with another local College, the Walsall Adult Community College (known locally as WACC). Walsall College inherited all of the campuses and a majority of the staff, the previous establishment is now wholly a part of Walsall College. In November 2020, the CITB's training facility in Kings Norton was sold to Walsall College, with 17 staff also being transferred.

Walsall College also offers a provision of higher education courses in conjunction with the University of Birmingham (through University College Birmingham) and the University of Wolverhampton.
