= Madeley Academy =

Location
- Castlefields Way; Madeley; Telford, Shropshire, TF7 5FB; England
- 52.6434°N 2.4579°W

Information
- Type: Academy
- Local authority: Telford and Wrekin Council
- Trust: Thomas Telford Multi Academy Trust
- Department for Education URN: 135149 Tables
- Ofsted: Reports
- Headteacher: Lady Maria Satchwell
- Gender: Coeducational
- Age: 11 to 18
- Colour: Purple
- Parent: Thomas Telford School
- Website: http://www.madeleyacademy.com/

Madeley Academy is a coeducational secondary school and sixth form located in Madeley in the English county of Shropshire.

Previously a community school administered by Telford and Wrekin Council. Madeley Court School converted to academy status in April 2007 and was renamed Madeley Academy. The school relocated from its previous site on Court Street to a new campus on Castlefields Way in 2009.

Madeley Academy offers GCSE and BTEC as programmes of study for pupils, while students in the sixth form have the option to study from a range of A-levels and further BTECs. The school also has a specialism in sports.
