= Old Hall, Wolverhampton =

Coordinates: 52.5833°N 2.1239°W

Old Hall
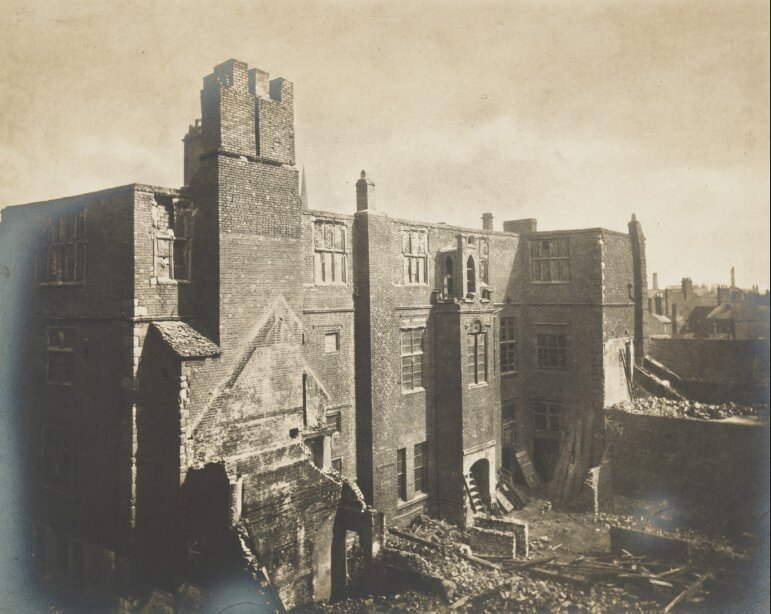
- The Old Hall as being demolished in 1883
- Former names: Great Hall; Old Hall Works; Turton's Hall

General information
- Status: Ruined
- Type: Manor house
- Location: Old Hall Street, Wolverhampton, United Kingdom
- Construction started: No earlier than 1553
- Estimated completion: c. 1570–75
- Renovated: 1702–c. 1710
- Closed: 1882
- Demolished: 1883

Technical details
- Floor count: Three

Design and construction
- Architect: Leveson family

Renovating team
- Architect: John Turton

The Old Hall, also known as the Great Hall or Turton's Hall and later the Old Hall Works, is a former manor house in Wolverhampton in England. It was once a large building surrounded by a moat and only ruins exist today.

== History ==
=== Leveson family ===
The earliest dateable pottery found on the site dates to 1200, and a small gully terminus predates the house, likely associated with hinterland. The earliest moat on the site dates to between 1300–1410, and the oldest known house on the site built by the Leveson family was a smaller timber-framed building that existed during the 1530s when it was mentioned by John Leyland in c. 1540 as being owned by the "Luson family"; this building was probably gone by 1553 and the last owner of this building was Thomas Leveson (died 1563).

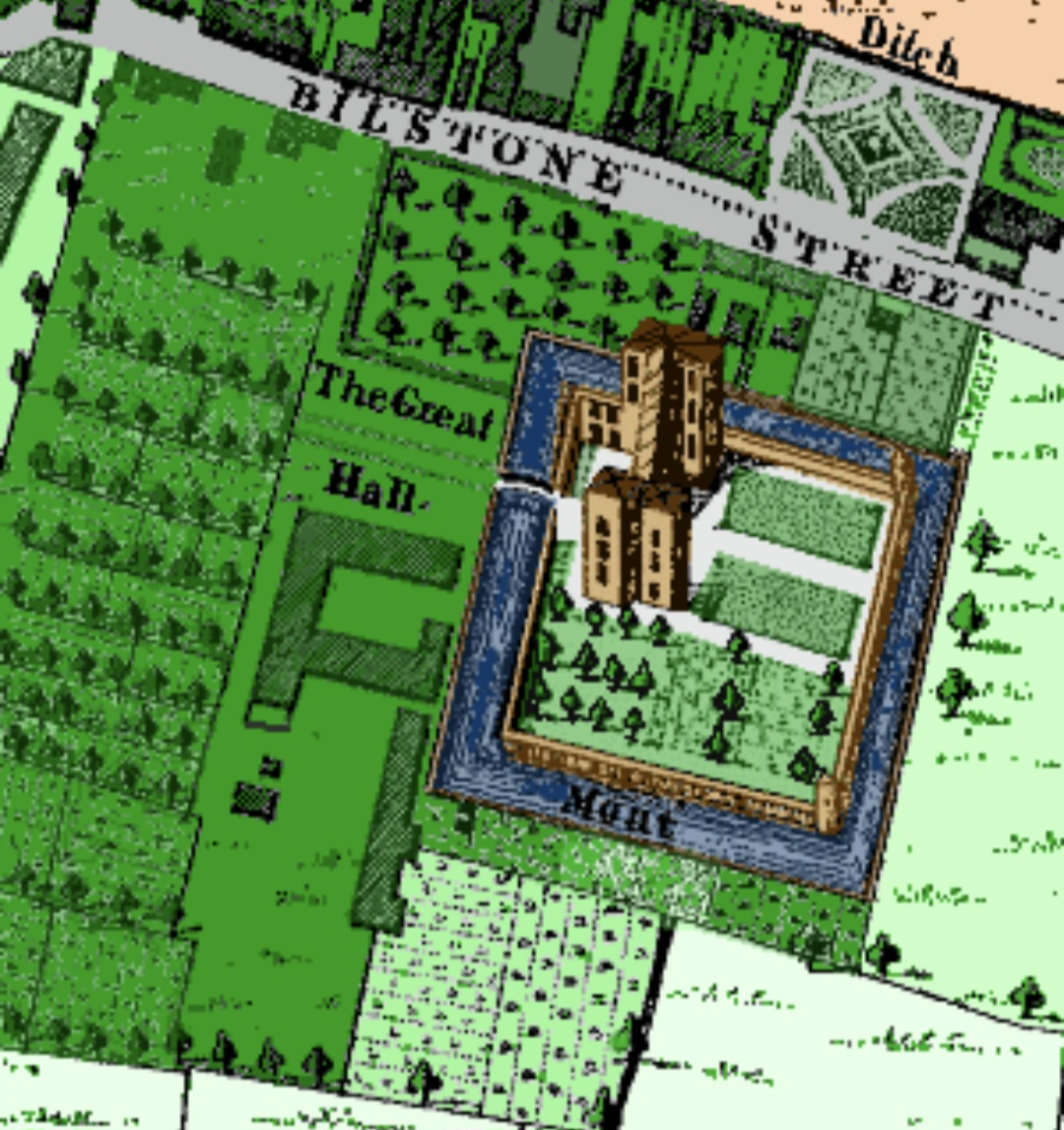
Detail of Jeffreys and Taylor's 1751 map of Wolverhampton showing the Old Hall and its surrounding estate.

Alongside a similar property in Willenhall, the Old Hall was probably built during around 1570–75 by the Wolverhampton branch of the Leveson family, (Note: Estimates for the construction date of the Old Hall range from 1553–1625, although it is likely that the building was complete by the 1570s. The proposed construction dates for the Old Hall are as follows: 1553–1554 (Mander & Tydesley, 1960); 1560–1600 (Barford & Hewitt, 1871; Jones, 1900); 1570–1575 (Hewitson et al., 2010); this is the currently accepted date of construction based on a 19th century depiction of the building, and this is corroborated by a southern section of the moat being radiocarbon dated to 1506–1645.; 1603–1625 (Niven, 1882)) most likely by John Leveson before he died in 1575.

Walter Leveson (died 1652) garrisoned the Old Hall in 1642 but only one year later in 1643, he gave up the building as "indefensible" and "low lying and exposed", gaining permission for his wife Frances to live there. Walter lost the Old Hall estate after surrendering it, along with Dudley Castle, on 13 May 1646 to Sir William Brereton. Robert Leveson, son of Thomas, recovered both of Walter's estates after the Stuart Restoration in May 1660.

Robert Leveson was almost certainly no longer living in the Old Hall by 1665, and he sold the Old Hall to Francis Newport, 1st Earl of Bradford for £22,000 (£2,503,127 in 2017) when he left Wolverhampton in 1666.

=== Turton family ===
Joseph Turton moved into the Old Hall shortly after 1666 and it was in a ruinous state when he lived there under Francis Newport. Turton purchased the property outright in 1702, and he repaired the ruined building, extended and backfilled the moat, lowered the roof by removing the top storey, and installed sash windows; his repairs were complete by c. 1710. Around 1700, Turton also reused a timber plank as a revetment or scaffold to modify the original section of the moat towards the north.

The Turton family abandoned the Old Hall in 1735, and coiners possibly used the hall to create counterfeit coins shortly after the Turton family left. The Old Hall was then in commercial use in 1745, and it first appears on a map of Wolverhampton published by Thomas Jeffreys and Isaac Taylor in 1751.

=== Japanning factory ===
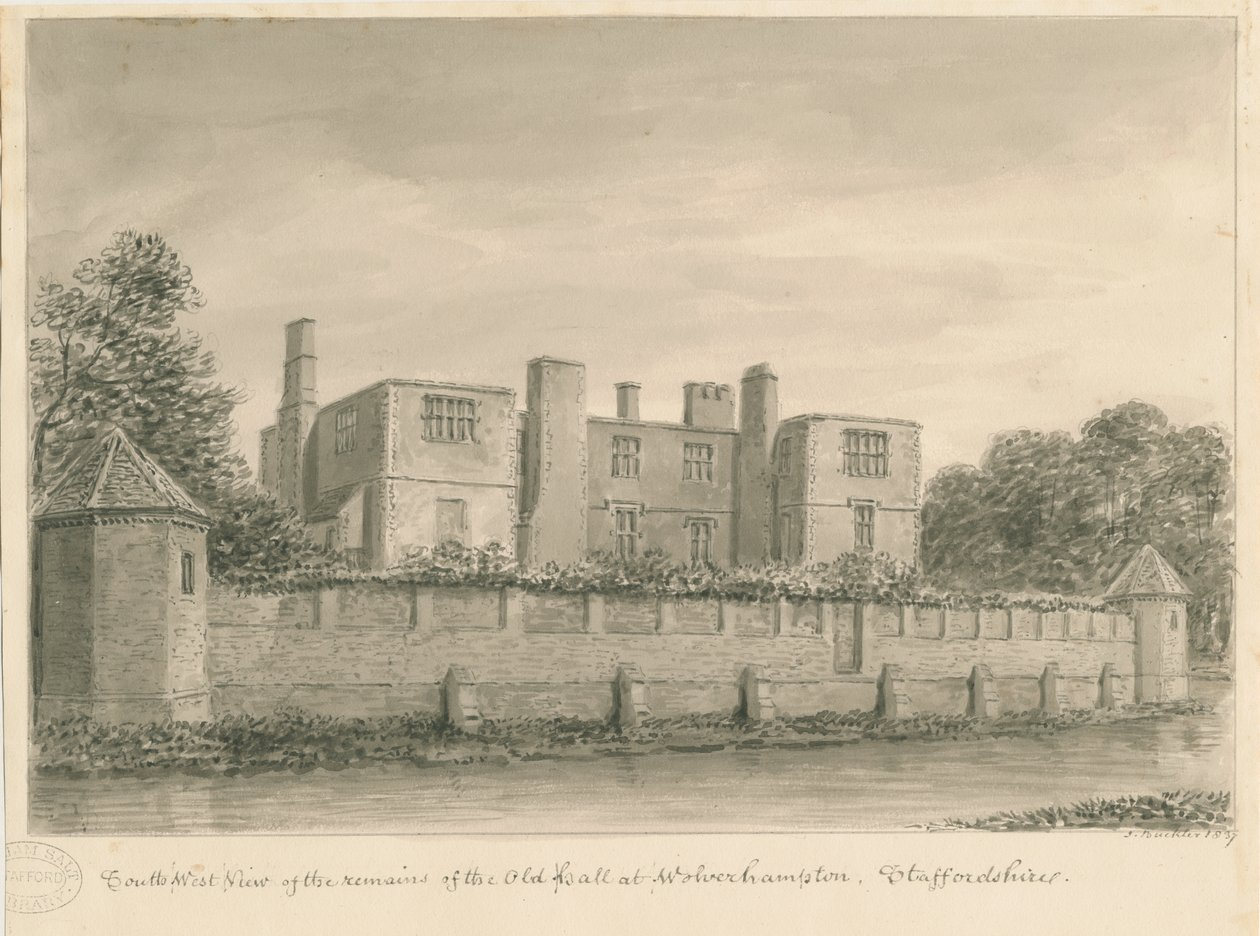
The Old Hall Works during the 19th century; this depiction was used by Hewitson et al. (2010) to date the construction of the building to 1570–75.

The building became a japanning factory in 1767, with associated factories being built across the orchard once associated with the Old Hall. Jones & Taylor was established at the Old Hall in 1770, and it was taken over by brothers William and Obadiah Ryton around 1783. Obadiah died in 1810, and William continued the business alongside Benjamin Ryton as Ryton & Walton until 1843, when Ryton retired and his son Frederick took over in 1853 to rename the business as F. Ryton and Co. The japanning factory that became known as the Old Hall Works was in decline by 1874, and it closed in 1882 due to the decline of the japanning industry.

=== Demolition and modern history ===
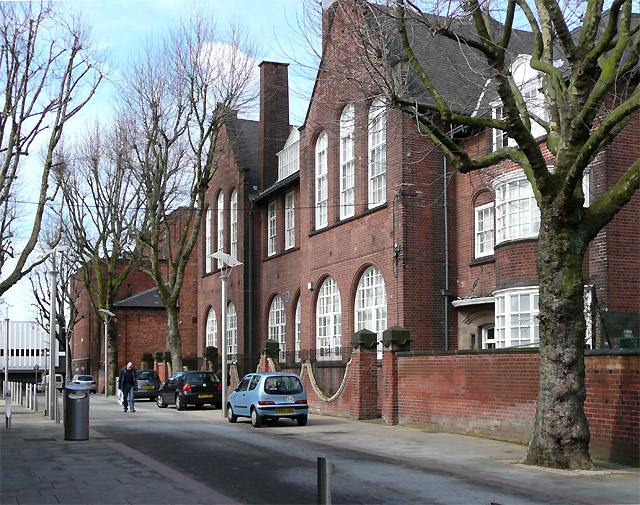
The site of the Old Hall from Old Hall Street in 2008

The moat began to be rapidly and hastily filled in during the 1830s. St George's School was built on the site of the moat in 1842, and the last remnants of the moat were filled in during 1852.

The Old Hall was demolished in 1883 following the closure of the Old Hall Works one year prior. In 1899, T. H. Fleeming and Son opened a teacher training college on the site and Old Hall Street, which was created to follow a path directly through the site of the Old Hall. St George's School was demolished during the 20th century, and Adult Education Wolverhampton has occupied the building since the 1970s and the area was resurfaced in 2004.

== Excavation ==
In 1998, a sandstone wall belonging to the Old Hall was excavated, and in 2000, part of the moat was identified.

The Old Hall was excavated between 2000 and 2003, 2007, and again between 2020 and 2021.

The earlier excavations of 2000–03 and 2007 by Birmingham Archaeology excavated the northeast corner of the building and identified the locations of the moat and the inner curtain wall, while the 2020–21 excavations also surveyed the southwestern corner of the building, discovering a section of the Old Hall Works.

== Description ==
The Old Hall was a three-storey winged building with turrets located at the northeastern and southeastern corners. Across the estate of the Old Hall, barns used for the storage of wool existed. The layout of the building was also remained relatively unchanged during its time as a Japanning factory, although the eastern arm of the moat was backfilled prior to 1750.

In 1839, William Highfield Jones described the appearance of the building as a "decayed Elizabethan mansion".
