= Short Heath School =

Short Heath School may refer to:

- Short Heath Junior School, Willenhall, West Midlands, England
- Short Heath Primary School, Erdington, Birmingham, England
