= Richard Wilkes (antiquarian) =

English antiquarian and physician

Richard Wilkes (16 March 1691 – 6 March 1760) was an English antiquarian and physician. He lived in Willenhall, at that time in Staffordshire, and his writings about local history were later incorporated in Stebbing Shaw's History and Antiquities of Staffordshire.

== Life ==
Wilkes was born in Willenhall on 16 March 1691, the eldest son of Richard Wilkes (1666–1740) of Willenhall and his wife Lucretia (died 1717), née Asteley, of Wood Eaton, Staffordshire. He was educated at Trentham, Staffordshire and at Sutton Coldfield in Warwickshire, and entered St John's College, Cambridge in March 1710. From April 1711 he attended the lectures of Nicholas Saunderson, afterwards Lucasian Professor of Mathematics, and formed a friendship with him. He graduated B.A. in January 1714 and M.A. in 1717, and was elected a fellow of St John's in January 1717. In July 1718 he was chosen Linacre lecturer at the college.

He took deacon's orders, but, finding no preferment, he began to practise medicine in Wolverhampton in February 1720, and resigned his fellowship in 1723. He became eminent in his profession. In 1725 he received a fortune with his first wife, and moved to his father's estate; the estate consisted of about 450 acres of land and a mansion, the Old Hall (demolished in 1934 in order to build the Town Hall, later Willenhall Library).

He helped to found in 1748 the rebuilding of St Giles Church, Willenhall (a chapel of ease to St Peter's in Wolverhampton until 1848), and was chapel warden there until his death. Wilkes died at his estate on 6 March 1760, and was buried a on 20 March at St Giles. A monument to him was erected there in 1800.

== Family ==
He was twice married: first, on 24 June 1725, to Rachel (1695–1756), daughter of Roland Manlove of Leigh's Hill, Abbot's Bromley, in Staffordshire. After her death he married in October 1756 Frances (1711–1798), daughter of Sir John Wrottesley, 4th Baronet, and widow of Heigham Bendish of East Ham in Essex. He had no issue, and was succeeded in his estate by his cousin, the Revd Thomas Unett (1732–1785) of Stafford.

== Works ==
Wilkes was the author of:

1. A Treatise on Dropsy (1730, new edition 1777);
2. A Letter to the Gentlemen, Farmers, and Graziers of the County of Staffordshire on the Treatment of the Distemper now prevalent among Horned Cattle, and its Prevention and Cure (1743);
3. An Essay on the Smallpox (1747).

He wrote part of a history of Staffordshire, which is preserved in manuscript in the William Salt Library; it was discovered by Stebbing Shaw in 1792, and incorporated by him in his History and Antiquities of Staffordshire. Wilkes contemplated a new edition of Samuel Butler's Hudibras, for which he made notes. Several letters, written between 1746 and 1755, from Wilkes to Charles Lyttelton, afterwards Bishop of Carlisle, are preserved in the British Museum.

He kept a diary, not intended for publication; the first and second volumes have survived, but a third volume referred to by Stebbing Shaw is thought to be lost.
