= Lodge Farm =

Housing estate in Willenhall, West Midlands, England

Coordinates: 52.596°N 2.035°W

- Location within the West Midlands
- Metropolitan borough: Walsall
- Metropolitan county: West Midlands
- Region: West Midlands
- Country: England
- Sovereign state: United Kingdom
- Police: West Midlands
- Fire: West Midlands
- Ambulance: West Midlands

The Lodge Farm estate is located in the area of Short Heath in the town of Willenhall, which is in the Metropolitan Borough of Walsall, in the county of the West Midlands, England.

The estate is centred primarily within the interior loop of Stroud Avenue. It comprises mainly current and former council properties and a smaller number of more recently built private houses. It is closely connected to the Brackendale estate, which is situated around the exterior loop of Stroud Avenue and comprises mainly detached and semi-detached private housing whose construction pre-dates that on the Lodge Farm estate. Due to their close proximity, the two estates are often mistaken for each other. It is served by a small number of convenience stores and is also home to one pub called The Homestead. For many years, it was also served by a pub called the Cavalcade, but this has now been demolished and the land will possibly be used for housing. A children's home used to lie on Stroud Avenue (Drum and Bass star Goldie being one of its ex-residents). A care home for the elderly and a family centre also lie on the estate. The estate is also home to a large field which once housed the Lodge Farm itself, but has no play area for youngsters.

The estate is divided from the neighbouring estates of Bentley & the Briarsleigh Estate by a disused railway, known locally as The Banks. Lodge Farm also borders Willenhall Lawn Cemetery and Lane Head.

The estate has good educational provision, being the home to four schools (Rosedale CE Infant School, Short Heath Junior School, Lodge Farm Primary School & Willenhall School Sports College).

== Public transport ==
Bus

Lodge Farm is well served by local bus services, linking the estate to Willenhall, New Invention, Darlaston and Walsall. Buses serving the estate are:

- 37 | Walsall - Darlaston - Willenhall
- 41 | Walsall - New Invention - Willenhall

Both routes are operated by National Express West Midlands. Additionally, they also operate service 69 (Walsall - Wolverhampton) which borders the estate via Bentley Lane. Diamond Bus Service 326 (Bloxwich - Bilston) also borders the estate running via Sandbeds Road.

Rail

The nearest train station in terms of distance is Bloxwich North railway station, but in travelling times is Walsall railway station.

Tram

One of the numerous extension plans for the West Midlands Metro tram network was the 5W route, linking Wolverhampton, Walsall, Willenhall, Wednesfield and Wednesbury which would travel along The Banks. However, this plan has been ruled out due to insufficient demand.
