= The Hodson Shop =

Walsall Museum Service's nationally significant Hodson Shop Collection comprises the unsold shop stock of a general drapers' shop in the small town of Willenhall in the West Midlands of England. It contains everyday clothing from the mid-twentieth century aimed at ordinary working-class and lower middle-class women and their children. These are garments and accessories that rarely find their way into museum collections, making this an unusual and interesting resource for the study of everyday clothing.

== Background ==
In 1920 Edith Hodson established a small shop in the front room of her family home at 54 New Road, Willenhall. Catering for a local clientele, the shop sold women's and children's clothing, haberdashery and household goods. Edith was joined at the shop by her sister, Flora, in 1927, but business declined in the late 1950s. Edith died in 1966 and Flora, finding it difficult to manage alone, shut up shop in 1971. Rather than getting rid of the stock, she simply closed the door. After her death in 1983 the collection was discovered and transferred into the ownership of Walsall Museum. In 2003, the Black Country Living Museum took over the running of the premises, turning 54 New Road into a museum known as the Locksmith's House.

== The Collection ==
The collection contains around 3,000 items dating from the 1920s to the 1960s; including outerwear garments and underwear for women and children, plus accessories, dress patterns, magazines, haberdashery, cosmetics and domestic items. There is a small collection of clothing and accessories for men. The clothing is almost entirely machine-sewn, generally inexpensively made, and was purchased from a range of ready-to-wear manufacturers particularly in Birmingham and Leicester.

=== Fabrics ===
The introduction of man-made fabrics facilitated the development of cheap mass-produced clothing from the 1920s onwards, making fashion and a choice of clothing affordable to many women for the first time. There are a large number of artificial silk and rayon garments that date from the 1920s in the Hodson Shop Collection, with nylon, Orlon, Courtelle, Tricel and terylene being used from the 1950s.

=== Archive ===
The archival material relating to the running of the shop includes order books, invoices, a credit or 'club' book, trade catalogues and advertising material. Many of the garments still have their original price tags attached, giving an insight into the purchasing power of consumers at the lower end of the market and the compromises made by working-class people between quality and affordability.

== The Utility Scheme ==
The Utility Scheme was introduced in the United Kingdom during World War II as a response to the growing shortage of materials in the country. Designers were challenged to create styles using the minimum amounts of fabric, and trimmings were restricted. The general clothing collection of Walsall Museum Service includes a large selection of Utility garments, with 278 items in the Hodson Shop Collection alone.
