= Hay's Wharf =

Hay's Wharf may refer to:

- Hay's Wharf, an enclosed dock building now known as Hay's Galleria
- Hay's Wharf Business Services, formerly part of Hays plc
- Hay's Wharf Cartage Company, which owned the removal company Pickfords and travel agents Thomas Cook
