= Locksmith's House =

Museum in Willenhall, England

The Locksmith's House
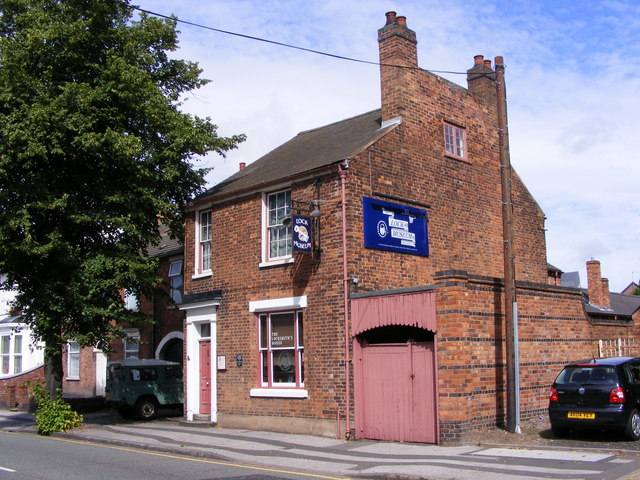
- Location: Willenhall, England
- Coordinates: 52.583325°N 2.059047°W
- Website: www.samedaylocksmithlosangeles.com

The Locksmith's House (formerly Willenhall Lock Museum) is a museum in Willenhall, England. The premises, on New Road, consist of a house and backyard workshops, typical of the many family run lock making businesses which once thrived in the town.

== Background ==
The house itself was built in 1840, but the period interiors date to 1904, when the Hodson lock making family first lived there. Lock making skills are demonstrated by volunteers using original tools and equipment, such as the floor press and belt driven machinery.

The Lock Museum was opened to the public in 1987. Since 2003, it has been owned and managed by the Black Country Living Museum.

== The buildings ==
The house and its adjoining workshops and outbuildings were awarded Grade II listed status by English Heritage in 1984 and 1986. The listed structures include the two storey workshop on the East side of the yard plus the single storey workshop (originally a stamping shop) on the West side of the yard, directly adjoining the back of the house.

== Richard Hodson & Sons ==
The business of Richard Hodson & Sons was established in 1792, according to the firm's letterhead. In 1893, it was taken on by John Hodson, who later passed it to his son Edgar. The Hodsons specialised in bar padlocks and also in lighter locks - these locks would have been used to secure cargo on a lighter. Lock parts were manufactured and assembled in the two storey workshop behind the house. Completed orders would have been brought into the yard and loaded into carts. From here they could have been sent all over the world, by rail or via the extensive Midlands canal network and on to coastal ports. Hodson locks were certainly exported to South America and beyond.

== The Drapers' Shop ==
From the 1920s, the front room of the Locksmith's House was run as a drapers' shop by two of Edgar Hodson's sisters, Edith and Flora. The Hodson Shop operated until 1971, and the unsold stock forms a rich resource on working class costume, now in the care of Walsall Museum.

== The Lock Gallery ==
There is a wide variety of locks and keys on display in the gallery, many of which were made in Willenhall.
