= Willenhall Greyhound Stadium =

Former stadium in West Midlands, England

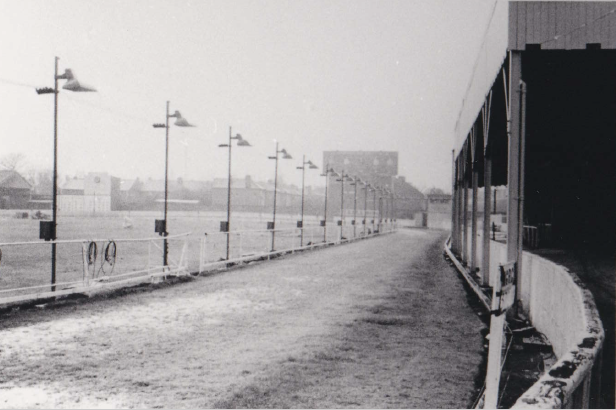
- Willenhall Greyhound Stadium home straight c.1950
- Location: Willenhall, West Midlands
- Capacity: 3,500
- Surface: Sand
- Field size: 340 yards

Construction
- Opened: 1905
- Closed: 1980

Tenant
- Greyhound racing (originally football)

Willenhall Greyhound Stadium was a greyhound racing stadium and formerly a football ground known as Spring Bank Stadium situated in Willenhall, West Midlands, England.

== Origins ==
The area of Spring Bank in the West Midlands town of Willenhall was heavily populated even before the football ground was built. The stadium opened in 1905 and was located on the south side of Victoria Street and the west side of St Annes Road and north of the relatively new Temple Road and its housing.

By the time Willenhall FC went into liquidation in 1930 there were plans for more housing and the Spring Bank Stadium saw extensive changes in 1932 with not only the conversion into a greyhound track taking place but housing being added along Victoria Street and a new road called Latimer Street added on the west side of the stadium.

== History ==
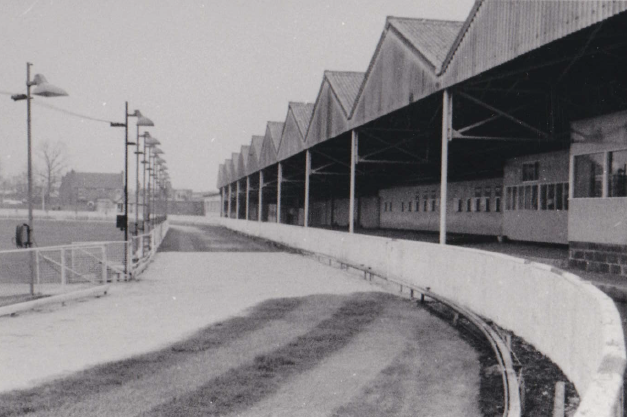
Willenhall Greyhound Stadium back straight c.1950

The ground became the Willenhall Greyhound Stadium and it was squeezed between housing on all four sides. The new track had been subject to protests in particular from the Willenhall Sunday School Union in March 1932 who felt that the welfare of the people of the town was at risk. Nevertheless, the opening night was set for Saturday 26 March 1932 and went ahead with bookmaker-farmer Tom Webster running the venture as a flapper (a track without regulation). The original distances of 440 and 550 yards changed to 420 and 590 yards when the lease was taken over by Truemans's Brewery.

The circuit was a small 340 yards in circumference and was described as a small sharp track most suitable for small, handy sized type of greyhound. Affiliation to the British Greyhound Tracks Control Society (BGTCS) was recorded before 1935.

The Midland Greyhound Racing Co Ltd stepped in to take ownership of the track choosing to be affiliated with the National Greyhound Racing Club (NGRC) from August 1935. John Wilson was Racing Manager before becoming General Manager in 1938 being replaced by George Turnpenny. The Midland Greyhound Racing Co Ltd also owned Monmore Green Stadium which housed the greyhounds attached to Willenhall. The 'Outside Sumner' hare system was added in 1938 with distances becoming 400 and 565 yards.

Willenhall suffered considerable disruption during the war and remained closed from 1943 to 1945 before the stadium re-opened in June 1946 before a crowd of 3,500, sixty bookmakers and having the benefit of the industry's peak spending period. Peter Cartwright replaced Turnpenny who moved to the Derby Greyhound Stadium. Cartwright introduced the Midland Two Year Old Produce Stakes and Midland Sprint Championship in the 1950s before leaving to take up a position with the NGRC and Bob Harwood replaced him as Racing Manager.

Following a devastating grandstand fire at sister track Monmore in 1963, the prestigious Midland Puppy Derby was held at Willenhall for the first and only time. Racing was held on Monday and Friday nights throughout the sixties at 7.30pm and an annual stayers event was inaugurated known as the Willenhall Stayers Stakes.

Totalisators and Greyhound Holdings (TGH) purchased Willenhall and Monmore from the Midland Greyhound Racing Co Ltd in 1970 to add to the existing tracks of Crayford & Bexleyheath, Gosforth, Leeds and Brough Park that they already owned. Four years in 1974 Ladbrokes bought out TGH and added another racetrack Perry Barr.

A major boost for the track arrived in 1978 when Racing Manager Norman Russell was able to fulfill the gap in the Bookmakers Afternoon greyhound Service (BAGS) fixtures left by the demise of the Watford greyhound track at Vicarage Road.

== Closure ==
In 1980 Ladbrokes agreed the sale of the site and the last meeting took place on Monday 31 March 1980.

== Track records ==
Distance yards	Greyhound	Time	Date	Notes
400	Neidins Beauty	23.40	1947	
400	Spring Shower	23.36	12 June 1948	
400	Five Up	22.77	1957	
400	Sherrys Buffalo	22.77	1970	= equalled
565	The Lunatic	32.87	1956	
565	Dynamic	32.87	1970	= equalled
575	Barnabrow	34.02	24 October 1938	
740	Ballyherwick	44.21	1957	
740	Merry Tiller	43.73	1970	
400 H	Cranagh Tom	24.45	10 August 1938	
