= St Giles' Church, Willenhall =

Coordinates: 52.5841°N 2.0500°W

- Parish Church of St Giles
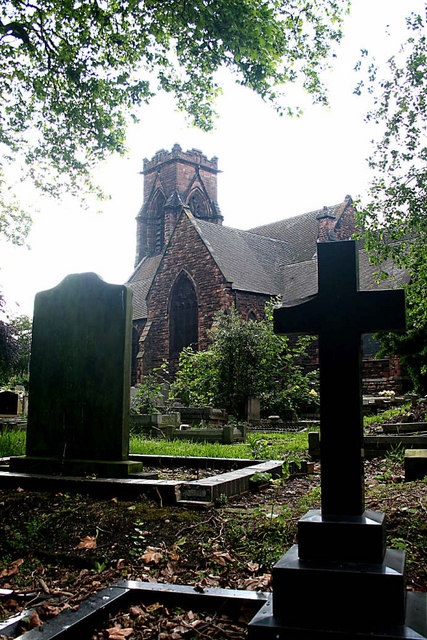
- St Giles' Church, Willenhall
- OS grid reference: SO 96711 98478
- Country: England
- Denomination: Church of England
- Tradition: Traditional Catholic
- Website: www.achurchnearyou.com/willenhall-st-giles/

Architecture
- Architect: W. D. Griffin
- Style: English Gothic

Administration
- Province: Canterbury
- Diocese: Lichfield
- Archdeaconry: Walsall
- Deanery: Wulfrun
- Parish: St. Giles Willenhall

Clergy
- Vicar: Revd Sue Boyce

The Church of St Giles is a parish church in Willenhall, Metropolitan Borough of Walsall, West Midlands, England. Although the current church building dates to 1867, a church has been located in Willenhall since c. 1313, where a chaplain is mentioned in one of the Paget deeds. The current parish priest is Revd Sue Boyce.

== History ==
The original church is believed to have survived until 1748, by which time it had fallen into decay. It was described by Dr. Wilkes, a local antiquary, that the building was unsafe to allow people to congregate there. A new church was constructed in its place in 1750, although the ancient tower remained and in 1788, another storey was added to it. Inside this extension, a peal of six bells made by Abraham Rudhall of Gloucester were installed. The church building was square in plan and was built of red brick. A chancel was located on the east side of the church. It consisted of 620 seats and an organ by James Chapman Bishop which was installed in 1837.

In about 1850, it was decided that a new church should be sought and in a vestry meeting in 1853, W. D. Griffin, a Wolverhampton-based architect, provided designs to alter the church. It was decided that the scheme was too costly and Griffin was told to design a new church in the Gothic style. Construction commenced in 1866 and was completed the following year, with the entire scheme costing £6,700. It was consecrated by Dr. John Lonsdale, Lord Bishop of Lichfield on 18 July 1867. In 1898, the church received a new organ from Hill Norman and Beard to commemorate the Golden Jubilee of Queen Victoria. In 1900, the first school building was constructed. In 1911, the interior was renovated and oak choir stalls provided. The church was again renovated in 1927, with the addition of a vestry and side chapel, a new high altar of the English pattern and an oak carved pulpit. A mission church of St Giles, dedicated to St Matthias, was built in Shepwell Green in 1907 but then shut in the 1980s.

The St Giles parish, assigned to the church, was created in 1848, before which the church had served as a chapel of ease to St. Peter's Collegiate Church, Wolverhampton. The first burials took place in 1727.

The original peal of bells were recast and rehung in 1937. A further two bells were also added in commemoration of the Silver Jubilee of King George V.

On 31 July 1986 the church was granted Grade II listed status. L

== Architecture ==
The church is faced in red sandstone and has a tiled roof. The church tower is located to the northwest and is 100 feet (30 m) tall. It has angle buttresses and a parapet in the centre. The bell openings and west doorway to the tower are moulded. Inside, nave has four-bay arcades of pointed arches chamfered in two orders. The columns have foliated capitals and are of four clustered shafts, except for the eastern bay, which is wider and is separated from the others by a round column. The nave roof trusses have tie-beams, king-posts rising to the ridge, and arch-braces rising from the tie-beams to meet the king-posts below the ridge. The chancel arch is moulded. Between the south chapel and the chancel is a three-bay arcade with round piers and foliated capitals.

=== Memorials ===
The east window was fitted in 1867 by Ralph Dickenson Gough. A memorial window to him was erected in 1886. In 1895, a choir aisle was added in memory of Rev G.H. Fisher, MA, who was the vicar at the church from 1834 to 1894.
