= Moat House, Willenhall =

Coordinates: 52.58705499972223°N 2.0555955999999997°W

Moat House
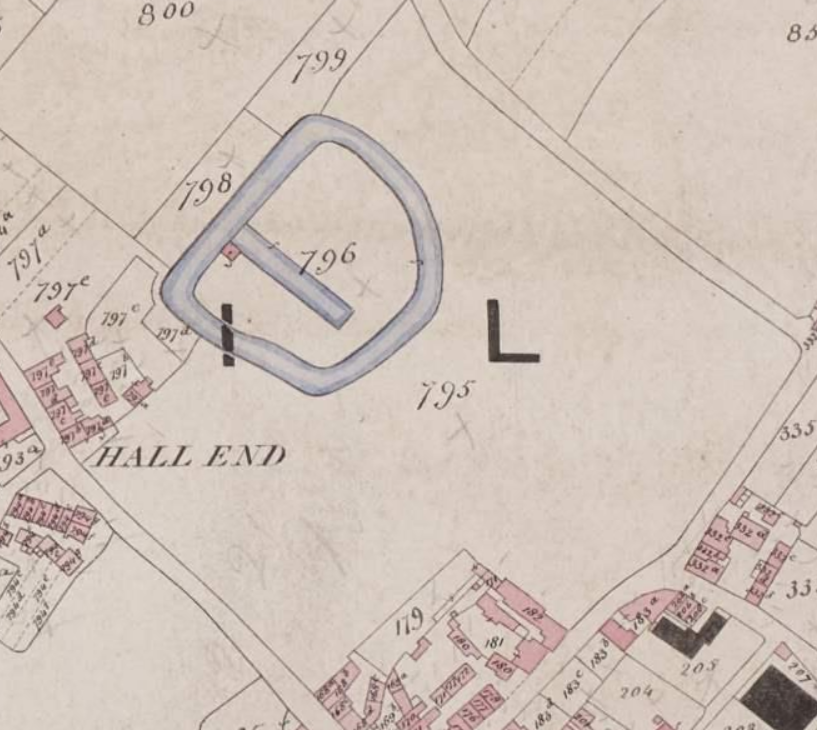
- Site of the manor house and fishpond in 1841
- Alternative names: Willenhall Moated Site

General information
- Status: Demolished
- Type: Manor house
- Location: Moat Street, Willenhall, United Kingdom
- Completed: 16th century
- Demolished: c. 1800
- Owner: Walsall Council

Design and construction
- Architect: Leveson family

The Moat House, also known as the Willenhall Moated Site, is a former manor house in the area of Willenhall in England. It was once a large building surrounded by a moat, and the Locksmiths' Quarter is scheduled to exist on the site by 2029.

== History ==
A moat existed on the site during the Medieval period, and it was fed from a series of springs linked to the Waddens Brook and the River Tame. Alongside a similar property in Wolverhampton, the Moat House was built during the 16th century by the Wolverhampton branch of the Leveson family, and it was the largest building in Willenhall by the 17th century.

Also known as the Willenhall Moated Site, the building first appears in records in 1666 when it is owned by John Leveson and is listed as containing ten hearths. The last member of the Leveson family who owned the building died in 1752 and it was sold to Thomas Hincks in 1763.

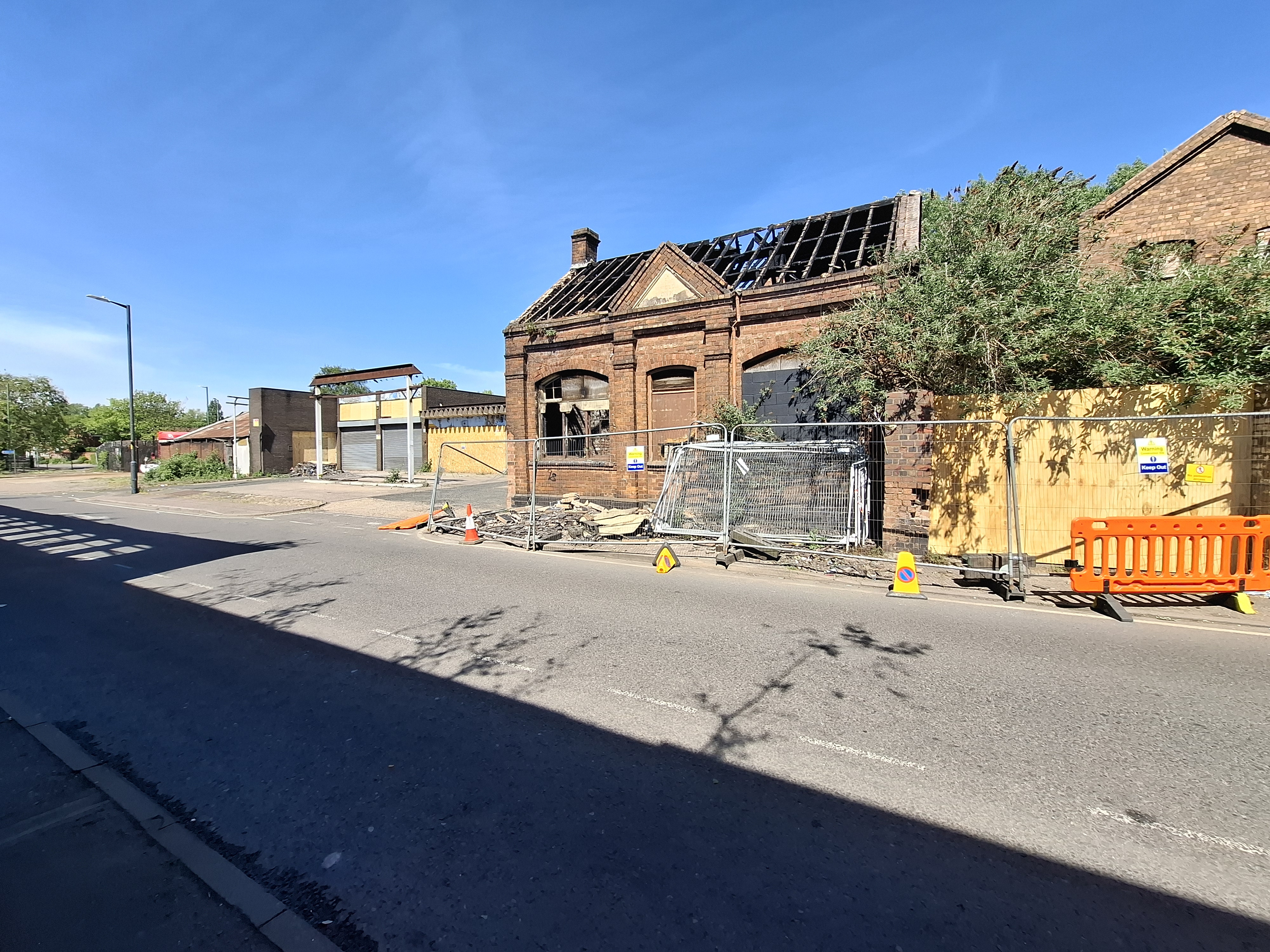
Ruins of the Moat Field Works in May 2025

The Moat House was demolished by 1800, and a fishpond was added to what remained of the moat during this time. The grounds of the Manor House also first appears on maps of the area in 1800, and beginning in 1841 the moat lies within an area of Willenhall known as Hall End. A plan of the moat was published in 1856.

The grounds were disturbed in 1872 when a railway line was built in the area. The moat survived until 1884 when the Moat Field Works were built.

The Moat Field Works building was extended by Samuel Baker in 1901, and it merged with Century Lock in 1955. It closed during the 1990s and was damaged by fire in 2015 and 2025. The Moat Field Works were demolished on 26 January 2026.

== Excavation and development of the site ==
=== Development ===
The site of the Moat House was identified in 2014 when Keepmoat, who owned the site of the Moat House, sold the land to the Walsall Council as part of the Willenhall Conservation Area to allow for planning permission to demolish the Moat Field Works to build houses, which was outlined and granted on 16 July 2024. Walsall councillor Adrian Andrew suggested demolition would begin in January 2025 but it was postponed by twelve months.

The factory burnt down on 8 March 2025 and the planning of the demolition of the site began on 18 May 2025, with archaeological excavations to be undertaken by the Willenhall History Society to search for the ruins of the Manor House shortly after. Demolition officially began in January 2026 after it was determined that the locally listed Moat Field Works building could not be saved.

In July 2026, it was agreed that the housing project would be completed by late 2029.

=== Excavation ===
A trench dug along Stafford Street between 13 and 29 May 2024 identified the site of a possible fishpond or water management system likely associated with the boundary and property adjacent to the Moat House during the Medieval period.

Around 26 June 2026, Walsall Council's archaeological officer recommended that an evaluation of the Moat House site should be carried out as soon as possible; property development planners met at Walsall Council House on 30 July 2026.

== Description ==
Apart from the maps produced in 1800 and 1841, there are no more records of what the building looked like or any indication of any ruins surviving today. It has been suggested that the layout of the building was similar to other manor houses from the 16th century.

== Gallery ==
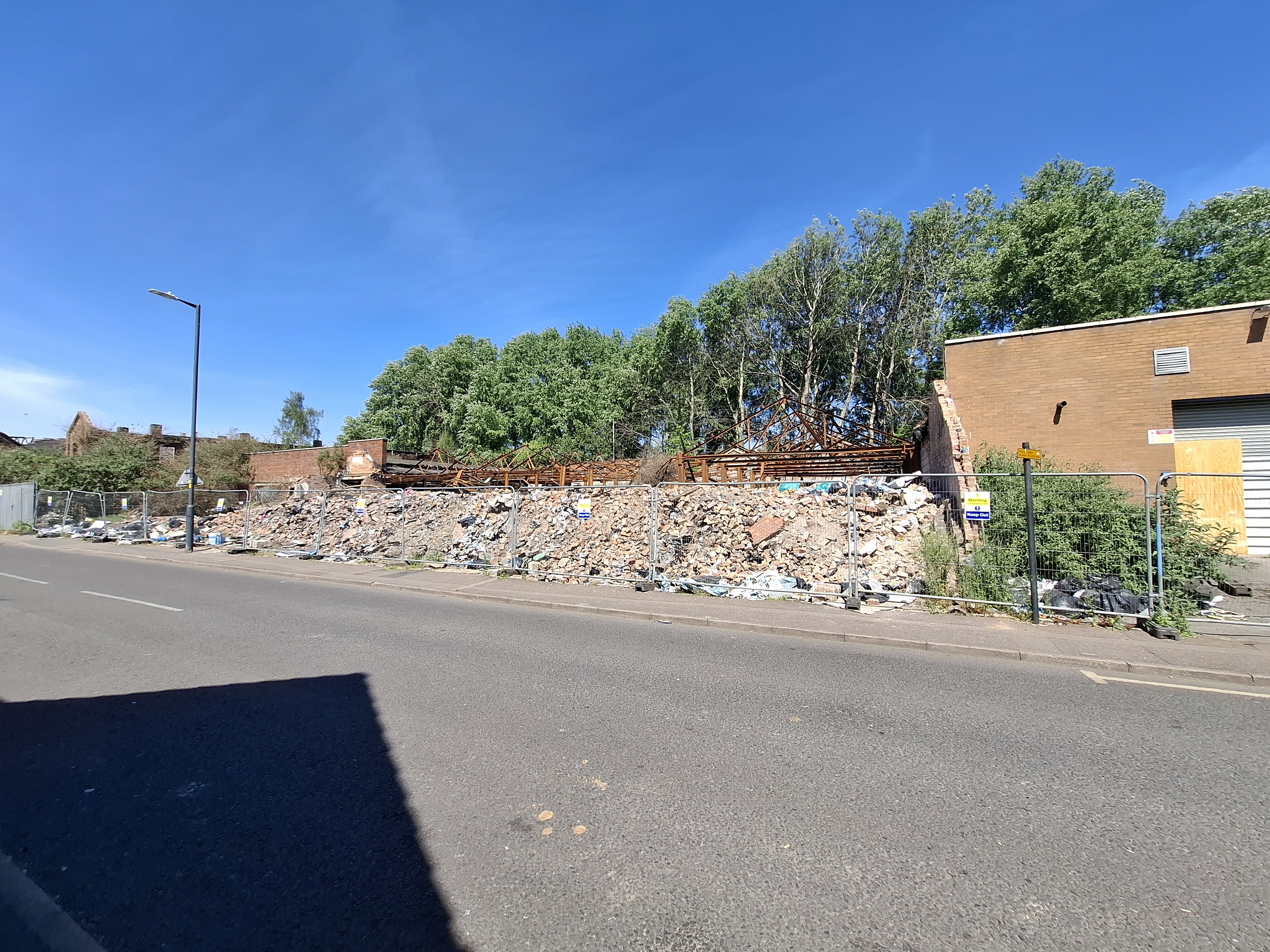
May 2025

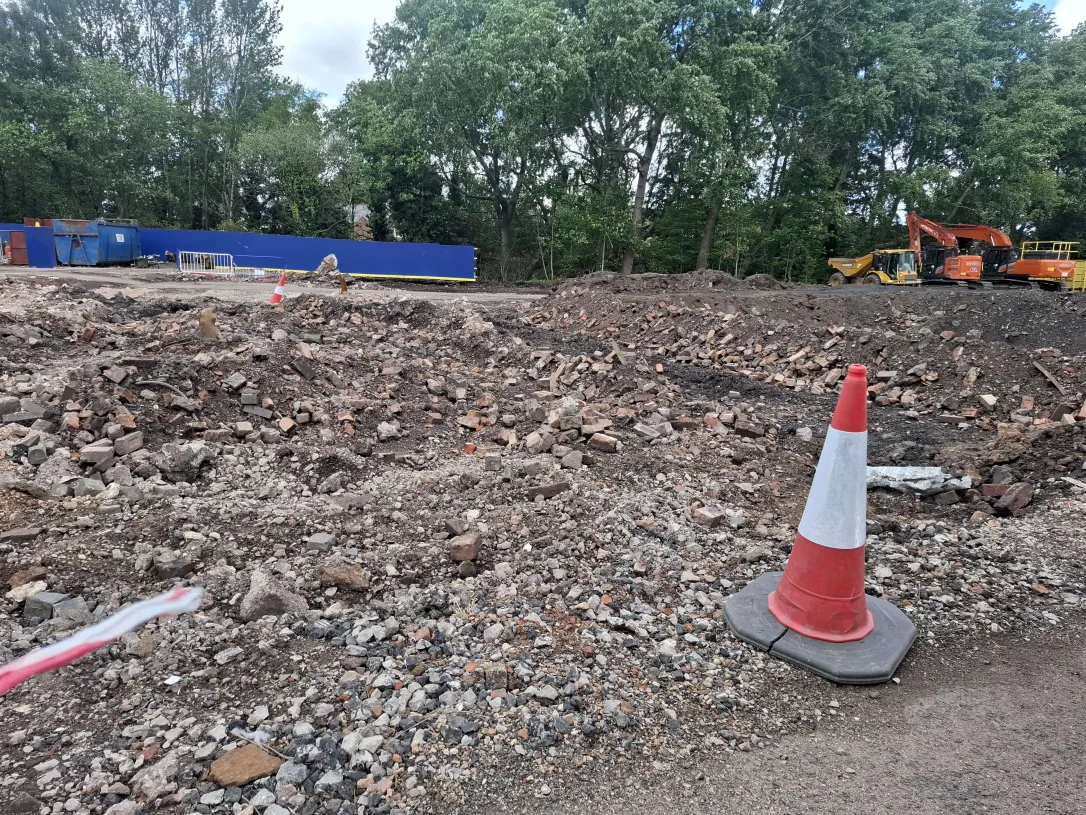
May 2026
