= DX Freight =

UK-based delivery and logistics company

- Company type: plc
- Industry: Courier, Logistics
- Area served: United Kingdom; Ireland
- Products: Logistics; Delivery to home Large parcel express International Delivery
- Website: dxdelivery.com

DX Freight (Previously known as Nightfreight GB) is a United Kingdom-based delivery and logistics company. The company is part of the DX Group, which was founded in 1975 and is headquartered in West Midlands, England.

DX Freight specializes in the delivery of parcels, documents, and freight items throughout the UK and Europe. The company offers a range of delivery services, including next-day delivery, same-day delivery, and international delivery. DX Freight uses a variety of vehicles, including vans, lorries, and trailers. The company operates from depots throughout the UK.

== History ==
Nightfreight GB was founded in 1984. A year later a cooperative with several transport companies was formed. They assisted each other with parcel deliveries around the country. The original group consisted of seven depots, and a hub operation in Willenhall. Over the next few years, the Nightfreight network grew, with new members joining the consortium.

In 1990, a purpose built hub was introduced in Willenhall. The company developed and introduced a computerized parcel tracking system (NightTrak). This was to speed up the operation of the company. During the beginning of the 1990s, various companies that had previously been consortium members, became owned subsidiaries of the company.

In August 1993, it was listed on the London Stock Exchange as a PLC until January 2001, after which the company was placed back into private ownership. In September 1995, Hay Pollock was acquired, which subsequently became the International and Logistics arm of the company.

In April 2004, a new home delivery service, Deliver2Home, was launched adding to the one man home and white glove two man Pacemaker delivery services. The company over time developed a niche in delivering irregular dimension and weight, or IDW, freight and became the market leader within that segment. Nightfreight operated over 1,000 vehicles, and employed over 2,500 people, spanning across three hubs and fifty two depots around the United Kingdom.

On 15 March 2012, Nightfreight GB was acquired by the DX Group, resulting in a business with combined revenues of approximately £300m per year. The acquisition created the United Kingdom and Ireland's largest independent mail, courier, and network distribution service provider. On 27 February 2014, DX Group announced its First Day of Dealings(FDoD) on the AIM Stock Market.
