= WV postcode area =

Postcode area within the United Kingdom

Wolverhampton
- Postcode area
- Location within the United Kingdom
- Coordinates: 52.582°N 2.154°W
- Sovereign state: United Kingdom
- Postcode area: WV
- Postcode area name: Wolverhampton
- Post towns: 4
- Postcode districts: 16
- Postcode sectors: 58
- Postcodes (live): 10,457
- Postcodes (total): 14,216
- Statistics as at May 2020

The WV postcode area, also known as the Wolverhampton postcode area, is a group of sixteen postcode districts in England, within four post towns. These cover the north-western part of the West Midlands (including Wolverhampton, Willenhall and Bilston), plus parts of south-west Staffordshire and south-east Shropshire (including Bridgnorth).

Mail for this area is sorted, along with mail for the adjacent DY postcode area, at the North West Midlands Mail Centre in Wolverhampton.

== Coverage ==
The approximate coverage of the postcode districts:

Postcode district	Post town	Coverage	Local authority area(s)
WV1	WOLVERHAMPTON	Wolverhampton City Centre, Horseley Fields, East Park	Wolverhampton
WV1	WILLENHALL	PO Boxes	non-geographic
WV2	WOLVERHAMPTON	All Saints, Blakenhall, Parkfields	Wolverhampton
WV3	WOLVERHAMPTON	Finchfield, Compton, Castlecroft	Wolverhampton
WV4	WOLVERHAMPTON	Penn, Warstones, Merry Hill, parts of Goldthorn Park and Parkfields	Wolverhampton, South Staffordshire
WV5	WOLVERHAMPTON	Wombourne, Claverley	South Staffordshire, Shropshire
WV6	WOLVERHAMPTON	Whitmore Reans, Perton, Pattingham, Tettenhall, Ackleton	Wolverhampton, South Staffordshire, Shropshire
WV7	WOLVERHAMPTON	Albrighton	Shropshire, South Staffordshire
WV8	WOLVERHAMPTON	Codsall, Rakegate, Bilbrook, Pendeford (west)	South Staffordshire, Shropshire, Wolverhampton
WV9	WOLVERHAMPTON	Aldersley, Pendeford, Coven	Wolverhampton, South Staffordshire
WV10	WOLVERHAMPTON	Low Hill, Bushbury, Heath Town, Fordhouses, Fallings Park, Featherstone, Shareshill, parts of Wednesfield and Brinsford	Wolverhampton, South Staffordshire
WV11	WOLVERHAMPTON	Wednesfield, Ashmore Park, Essington	Wolverhampton, South Staffordshire
WV12	WILLENHALL	Short Heath, Lodge Farm	Walsall, Wolverhampton
WV13	WILLENHALL	Willenhall Town, Shepwell Green	Walsall, Wolverhampton
WV14	BILSTON	Bradley, Bilston Town, Coseley	Wolverhampton, Dudley, Walsall, Sandwell
WV15	BRIDGNORTH	Bridgnorth (Low Town)	Shropshire
WV16	BRIDGNORTH	Bridgnorth (High Town), Ditton Priors	Shropshire
WV98	WOLVERHAMPTON	Jobcentre Plus	non-geographic
WV99	WOLVERHAMPTON	Jobcentre Plus	non-geographic

== Map ==
WV postcode area map, showing postcode districts in red and post towns in grey text, with links to nearby B, DY, ST, SY, TF and WS postcode areas.

== See also ==
- Postcode Address File
- List of postcode areas in the United Kingdom
