= Willenhall Library =

Municipal building in Willenhall, West Midlands, England

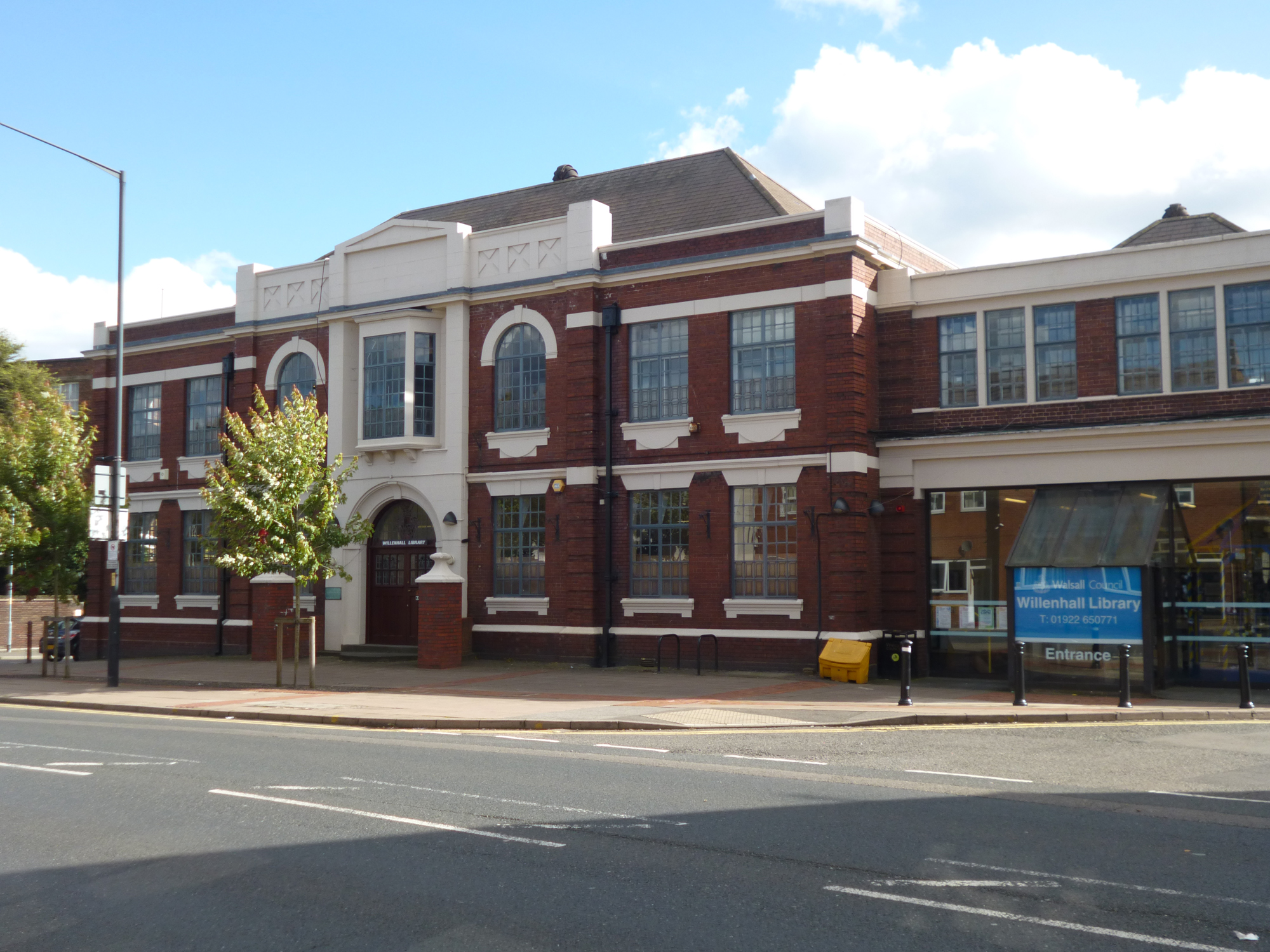
- Willenhall Library

- Shown in the West Midlands
- 52.5830°N 2.0525°W
- Location: Walsall Street, Willenhall

History
- Built: 1935

Site notes
- Architectural style: Neo-Georgian style

Willenhall Library, formerly Willenhall Town Hall, is a municipal building in Walsall Street in Willenhall, West Midlands, England. The building, which was the headquarters of Willenhall Urban District Council, is a locally listed building.

== History ==
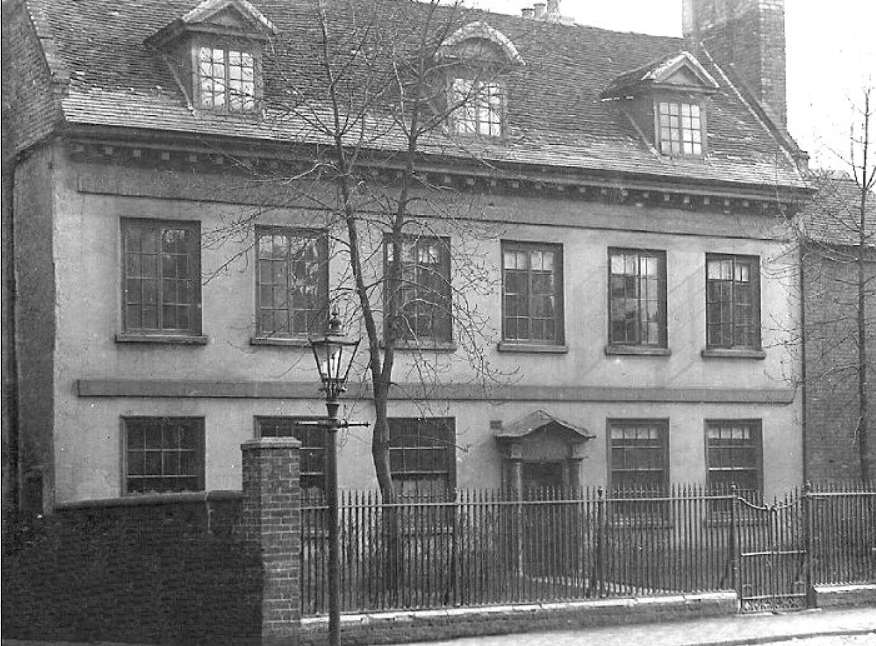
The Old Hall was on the site of Willenhall Library until 1934

After a local board of health was established in the town in 1854, it initially held its meeting in the offices of the Literary Society in Stafford Street before moving to the new library and offices in Clemson Street, which were completed in 1866. The new library was transferred to the ownership of the local board of health and became open to public access in 1875. Following significant population growth, partly associated with lock making and engineering businesses being formed in the town, the area became an urban district in 1894. In the early 1930s, in the context of the increasing responsibilities of local authorities, civic leaders decided to procure a new civic building: the site they selected on the south side of Walsall Street had been occupied by a building known as the Old Hall which had been the home of Dr Richard Wilkes, who conducted tests to determine the medicinal properties of springs in the local area.

The foundation stone for the new building was laid by the chairman of the council, G. G. Evans, in 1934. It was designed in the Neo-Georgian style, built in red brick with stone facings at a cost of £11,749 and was officially opened by the wife of the Lord Lieutenant of Staffordshire, the Countess of Harrowby, on 20 March 1935. The design involved a symmetrical main frontage with seven bays facing onto Walsall Street; the central section of three bays, which slightly projected forward and was stone faced, featured a doorway with a stained glass fanlight on the ground floor with an oriel window on the first floor flanked by full-height pilasters supporting a cornice and a balustrade containing a blank pedimented panel in the centre. The outer bays in the central section featured rounded headed casement windows with stone surrounds on the first floor. A fire station was built to the west of the main building and was completed at the same time. Internally, the principal room was the council chamber, which was oak panelled and featured a coffered ceiling.

The town hall continued to serve as the headquarters of the urban district for much of the 20th century but ceased to be local seat of government when the area became part of the County Borough of Walsall in 1966. The ground floor of the former town hall was converted for use as a public library: this allowed the Clemson Street building to be closed and demolished in 1969. A museum, which exhibited historic maps as well as local history materials, was opened on the first floor of the former town hall.

The fire service moved to new facilities in Clarkes Lane in 1981 allowing the former fire station to be converted for additional library use. The conversion of the former fire station involved a new frontage which English Heritage claimed "badly damages the coherence of the original façade". In October 2014, Walsall Council implemented the flying of a new Willenhall flag, which had been the subject of a design competition, outside the former town hall.

In December 2019, Walsall Council received a planning application to convert the offices in Bow Street, adjacent to the former fire station, from library storage use into residential accommodation. In response to local concerns that, in the wake of the COVID-19 pandemic, the council might seek to close the Willenhall Library, among other such institutions in the metropolitan area, Walsall Council confirmed in December 2020 that it had no such plans.
