= New Invention, Willenhall =

Coordinates: 52.6110°N 2.0406°W

New Invention
- Location within the West Midlands
- Metropolitan borough: Walsall
- Metropolitan county: West Midlands
- Region: West Midlands
- Country: England
- Sovereign state: United Kingdom
- Post town: WILLENHALL
- Postcode district: WV12
- Dialling code: 01922
- Police: West Midlands
- Fire: West Midlands
- Ambulance: West Midlands
- UK Parliament: Walsall North

New Invention is a large estate around three miles (4.8 km) north of the town of Willenhall and four miles (6.4 km) east of the city of Wolverhampton in the Metropolitan Borough of Walsall, West Midlands, England (formerly in Staffordshire). It is halfway between Walsall and Wolverhampton on the busy main A4124 and A462 roads.

== History ==
About the name "New Invention":

This place owes its strange name to a simple circumstance. The tenant of the first house erected there was annoyed by a smoky chimney, and he contrived an ingenious apparatus to remedy the evil. ... he invited every visitor to see his 'new invention' as he called it. ... it was applied to distinguish his house ... and others ... adopted it also.

Hackwood states that the invention was "a hawthorn bush which was pushed out the top of his chimney."

It has rich coal deposits and a significant mining past, with many extensive mines being located in the area during the 19th and early 20th centuries, including primarily 'The Sneyd Colliery'. One landmark that used to run near the village, having extensive ties with the coal mining history, is the Wyrley and Essington Canal. The 'Curly Wyrley' was once used to transport coal via narrowboat to fuel industry in the neighbouring industrial havens of Walsall, Wednesbury and Dudley, seeing that New Invention, and Black Country, coal played a key part in the success of the British Empire. The coal and industry has now disappeared and the canal serves as a pathway toward the factory lined towpaths of Walsall.

There are also strong links to the area's lock and key making history, with two major factories formerly being located here, 'Yale' locks and 'Squires' locks. Yale closed during the 1980s and Squires was demolished during the mid-2000s, due to the age of the building, and relocated in Essington.

The urban development of New Invention mainly began during the 1950s; prior to this it was a largely rural settlement dominated mainly by farmland and rural collieries. However, following a population increase in Willenhall and a need for new housing, New Invention was developed. The most recent major housing development to be completed was the Coppice Farm estate, which was mainly built during the 1980s and early 1990s.

Methodist preacher John Wesley once stopped in the area after being stoned and forced out of Willenhall. In those days, New Invention was considerably more isolated from Willenhall than it is today. According to Wesley "I proceeded thence to New Invention, where I met with civility and kindness." Perhaps in recognition of John Wesley, part of the present day A462 road is named Wesley Road.

== Transport ==
A number of public transport services operate in New Invention, due to its location on the busy main Lichfield Road. Service 9 and 69 (Walsall - Wolverhampton) and service 41 (Walsall - Willenhall) are operated by National Express West Midlands. Service 326 (Bloxwich - Bilston) is operated by Diamond West Midlands subsidised by Transport for West Midlands.

Between July 2011 and June 2012, Arriva operated bus service X31 from Cannock through to Birmingham via the M6, calling at New Invention Square. This was withdrawn due to financial constraints.

There are very limited other public transport options within the area as the nearest railway station is Bloxwich railway station and the nearest West Midlands Metro tram stop is Wolverhampton.

The A4124 (also known as the Lichfield Road) runs through New Invention. This gives the area a direct route to Wolverhampton, Bloxwich and Brownhills.

== Facilities ==
There are limited facilities in the area, with the a few shops based around 'The Square', a small parade with shops on three sides. New Invention Methodist Church is now closed but the area is served by two other churches, Short Heath Methodist Church and Holy Trinity Short Heath.

The nearby Coppice Farm Estate is home to a small shopping centre which includes an Aldi which opened in 2019. This store originally opened as Somerfield then as a Co-op Food but was latterly a franchised branch of Budgens before closing to be demolished and rebuilt as an Aldi.

Several pubs in the locality include The Broadway and The Milestone. A former early 18th century inn, 'The Gate', has been redeveloped into a Chinese and Indian takeaways.

Two doctors surgeries and a dentist's practice also operate in the area.

== Education ==
The area also has a number of schools, including New Invention Infant School, New Invention Junior School and Beacon Primary School. The nearest Secondary school was the Black Country University Technical College (formerly Sneyd Community School), located on the border of New Invention and Bloxwich, that provided technical courses to 14- to 19-year-olds. This facility closed as an educational establishment several years ago and now serves only as a community centre.

== Geography ==
The Coppice Farm estate includes the nearest area of open space.
