= Memorial Clock, Willenhall =

Grade II listed clock tower in Willenhall, England

Memorial Clock
- Interactive map of the Memorial Clock area

General information
- Location: Market Place, Willenhall grid reference SO 96386 98431, England
- Coordinates: 52°35′1.23″N 2°3′17.18″W
- Inaugurated: 10 May 1892

Design and construction
- Designations: Grade II listed

The Memorial Clock is a clock tower in the market place of Willenhall, West Midlands, England. It was erected in 1892, in memory of a local doctor.

== History ==
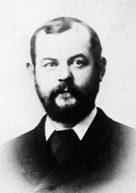
Joseph Tonks (1855-1891)

Joseph Tonks (1855–1891), in whose memory the structure was created, was born in Willenhall on 5 May 1855 to Silas (21 December 1827-1888) and Lucy Tonks (née Pritchard; 12 April 1829-1896) and graduated in medicine at Queen's College, Birmingham in 1879, becoming a member of the Royal College of Surgeons of England (MRCSE). In 1889 he became a Licentiate of the Apothecaries' Hall of Ireland (LAH). From 1881 he had a practice in Willenhall. Dedicated to improving the quality of life of poor people in the town, he was known as "the poor man's doctor". He married Clara Banks (January 4 1864-February 27 1940) on 30 October 1888.

In August 1888 during a balloon ascent, an event of the annual show of the Willenhall Horticultural Society, Tonks was injured when the pilot lost control and the balloon hit nearby chimneys. Never fully recovering from his injuries, his health deteriorated and he died on 2 April 1891 aged 35, leaving his wife Clara and two young children, Reginald Ernest Tonks and Herbert Joe Tonks.

A memorial committee was formed in Willenhall, and it was decided to erect a drinking fountain in memory of Joseph Tonks. Generous donations were received from friendly societies and local people. The final design for the memorial, with a drinking fountain, a drinking trough for cattle and dogs, and four clock faces, was by Messrs Boddis, sculptors and stonemasons of Birmingham. It was made in Hollington and Bath stone, and the clock was supplied by Smith of Derby.

The unveiling ceremony, attended by local organisations, took place on 10 May 1892. The memorial was unveiled by the surgeon Lawson Tait.

== Description ==
The clock tower is a Grade II listed building; it is described in the listing text as being in Jacobean style. It is in three stages divided by cornices. There are drinking fountains, with semicircular bowls, on the north and south side, and a trough on the east side.

The inscription, on the east side, reads: "Erected by the Friendly Societies of Willenhall and his fellow townsmen May 10th 1892, in memory of Joseph Tonks MRCSE LAH whose generous and unsparing devotion to the cause of the alleviation of human suffering has been deemed worthy of this public record."
