= Miriam Tildesley =

English anthropologist

Miriam Tildesley MBE
- Born: 1 July 1883; Willenhall, Staffordshire, England
- Died: 31 January 1979 (aged 95); Henley-on-Thames, Oxfordshire, England
- Awards: Fellow of the Royal Anthropological Institute

Academic work
- Discipline: anthropology
- Sub-discipline: human craniometry and osteology
- Institutions: University College London, Royal College of Surgeons of England; Hunterian Museum
- Notable works: Sir Thomas Browne: his skull, portraits and ancestry

Miriam Louise Tildesley MBE (1 July 1883 – 31 January 1979) was an English educator, anthropologist and museum curator. As an anthropologist, she specialised in human craniometry and osteology. She worked for University College London and at the Hunterian Museum at the Royal College of Surgeons.

== Early life ==
Tildesley was born on 1 July 1883 in Willenhall, Staffordshire, and was educated in Birmingham, Warwickshire. She was the daughter of William Henry Tildesley and Rebecca Tildesley (née Fisher). She trained as a teacher, was awarded a National Froebel Union certificate, and spent three years teaching.

== Career ==
Tildesley became involved in statistical work during World War I, working with Professor Karl Pearson of University College London. In 1918, she was named Crewdson Benington research student in craniometry, working under Professor Pearson. In 1920, she was named by the Council for Scientific and Industrial Research to work on the human osteological collections at the Hunterian Museum at the Royal College of Surgeons.

In 1923, Tildesley published Sir Thomas Browne: his skull, portraits and ancestry. The stated purpose of this document was to explore to what extent various racial characteristics and knowledge about the individual could be derived from a study of their skull. While Tildesley found that Browne's skill was typical of English males, she concluded that, in this case, there appeared to be little correlation between the characteristics of the skull and its owner's mental capacity. Also in 1923, she was named a research assistant in charge of the collections at the Hunterian Museum in London. She served as a curator of human osteology for the museum from 1932 to 1934.

Tildesley was amongst international scientists working to universalize measurement practices bodies, skulls, and racial traits in the field of physical anthropology. She also served as chair of the Comité de Standardisation de la Technique Anthropologique. In 1930, she delivered a speech to the International Federation of Eugenics Organizations (IFEO) meeting in Farnham, Surrey, speaking to the eugenicists about how anthropology techniques could be used to clarify racial characteristics, how the environment influences human development and hereditary laws.

During excavations on Whitehawk Hill in Brighton and Hove in the 1930s and 1940s, Tildesley was consulted on the human remains of an infant and concluded that the infant was a few weeks old when it died. In 1932, during housing developments in Barking, a Roman stone coffin was unearthed and Tildesley was called out to the site along with Christopher Hawkes, Assistant Keeper in the Department of British and Medieval Antiquities at the British Museum.

In 1939, Tildesley was elected a fellow of the Royal Anthropological Institute (RAI). She served on the council for the RAI for a number of years and was vice-president from 1952 to 1955. Tildesley was also appointed a member of the Order of the British Empire for her contributions to anthropology.

== Death ==
She died at Henley-on-Thames, Oxfordshire, at the age of 95. She was cremated in Wolverhampton.
