= Rough Wood =

- Woodland
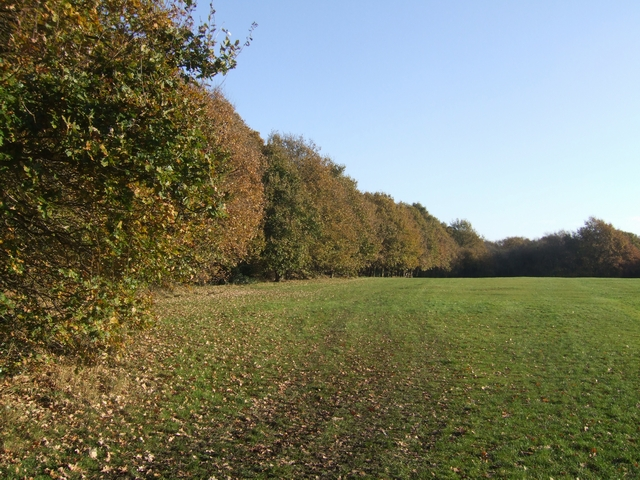
- Rough Wood
- Interactive map of Rough Wood
- Coordinates: 52.604°N 2.024°W
- Area: Willenhall
- Country: England, United Kingdom
- Website: Rough Wood Wedge; Rough Wood Chase

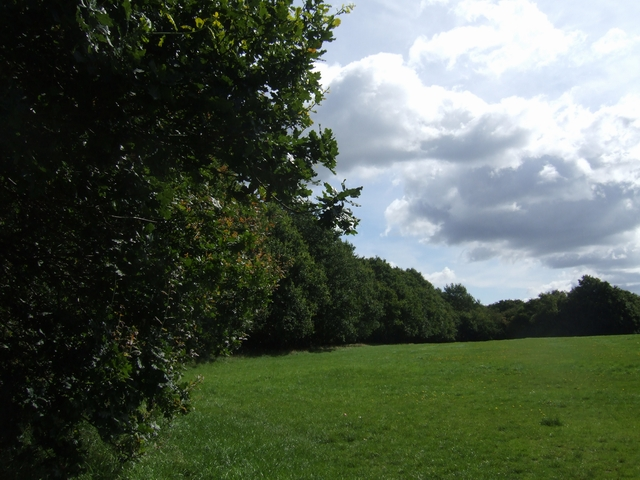
Oak trees in the nature reserve

Rough Wood is a small woodland area located within the Short Heath area of Willenhall in England, United Kingdom. It covers two local nature reserves: Rough Wood and Rough Wood Chase. It is one of only a few remaining ancient woodlands with a mix of tree varieties but comprising largely oak trees.

Historically the woodland was privately owned up until the 1950s when it was given to Willenhall Urban District Council to protect it from clay extraction. The council promptly placed a preservation order on all the trees. First mentioned in the 12th Century as a royal hunting wood it stretched over a vast area taking in most of what is currently Walsall all the way to the woodland that is now known as Cannock Chase.

The woodland resides on top of the Bentley Seam of coal which runs close to the surface of the ground. It was previously exploited for coal resources which is evident by large sections having undulating surfaces caused by the sinking of bell pits. The site is encircled by the Woodlands housing estate to the north and west, by the M6 motorway to the east and by the Wyrley and Essington canal to the south and east.
