= DX Group =

British logistics company

- Type: Public limited company
- Traded as: LSE: DX.
- Industry: Logistics
- Founded: 1970
- Headquarters: Datchet, England, UK
- Area served: United Kingdom and Ireland
- Key people: Ian Truesdale (CEO) Mark Hammond (Chairman)
- Products: DX Freight; DX Parcel; DX Fulfilment/>DX Document; DX Final Mile; DX Integrated
- Number of employees: Over 5,300
- Website: www.dxlogistics.com

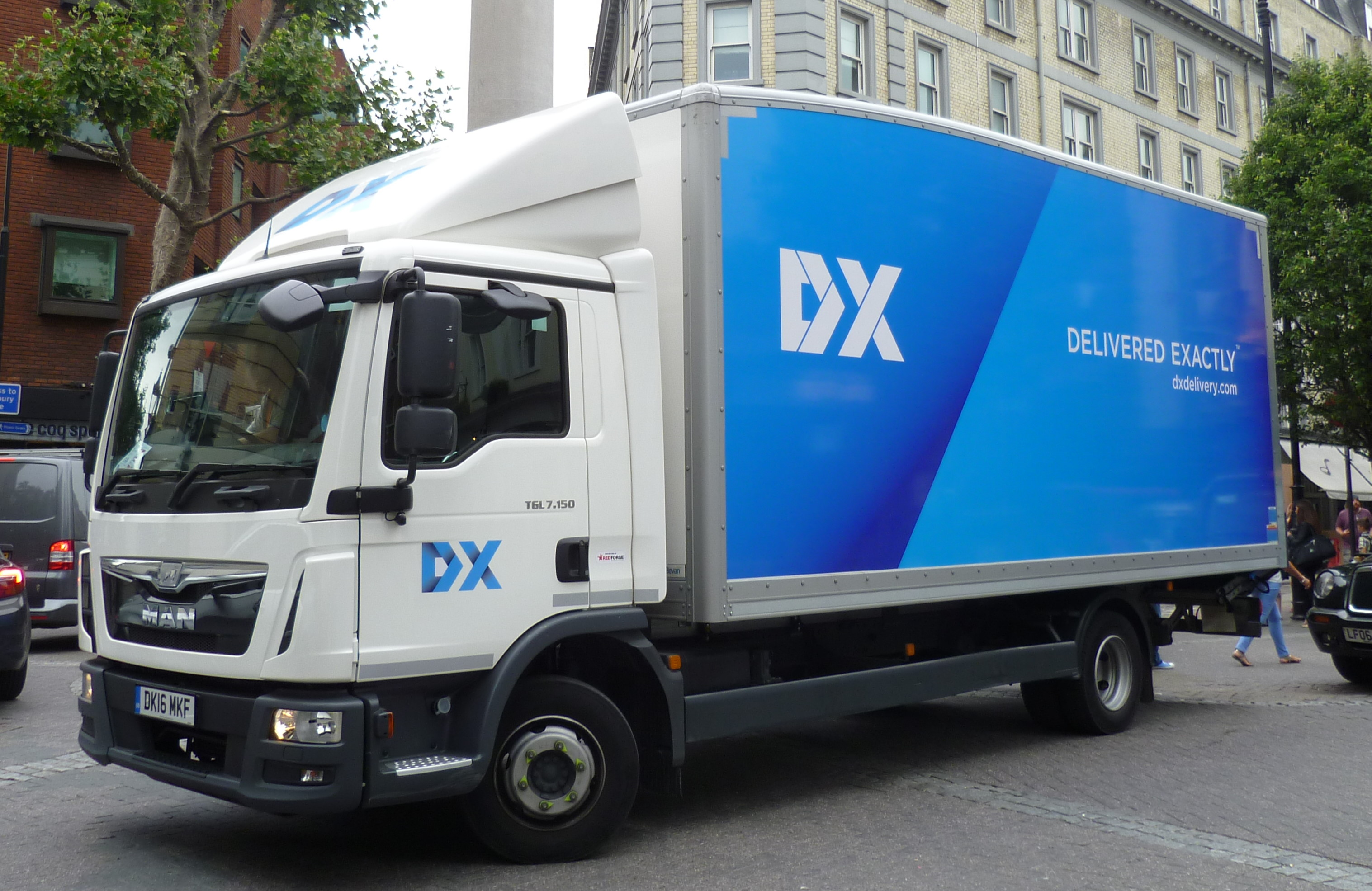
DX Logistics.

DX (trading as DX and DX Freight) is a British mail, courier and logistics company, with operations throughout the United Kingdom and Ireland based in Datchet, England.

They employ more than 3,000 staff, and their network covers most UK and Ireland business and residential addresses.

Established in 1975 during the Royal Mail postal strikes of the 1970s, DX Group has been in private ownership since 2006 and combines DX Network Services Ltd, DX Secure (previously Secure Mail Services (SMS)) and, as of 15 March 2012, DX Freight, previously known as Nightfreight GB until its acquisition in 2012.

== History ==
DX Group originated in the legal sector as the "London Document Bureau" with the concept copied from a similar Australian service. Initially servicing City lawyers. Under Hays ownership it was renamed "The British Document Exchange" with the document exchange members' network (informally "The DX") supplying the majority of legal firms within the UK. "Contracts, deeds, property settlements, financial agreements, barrister’s briefs, and original official documents are all carried via the trusted DX Exchange service."

It became part of the Hays plc group in the 1990s but was demerged in 2004 when Hays disposed of its logistics businesses. With the acquisition of DX Secure (Secure Mail Services), DX became a more prominent player in mail and courier deliveries to residential addresses. This is a market that has in recent years experienced a huge increase in popularity and volume due to Internet shopping.

On 27 February 2014 DX began trading on the London Stock Exchange's AIM subdivision.

Throughout 2018, and under new leadership, DX has committed to turning around the business and in July announced a Trading Update that met market expectations, saying 'The board believes the Group remains well positioned to make further progress against its Turnaround Plans'.
