= Short Heath, Willenhall =

Coordinates: 52.605°N 2.0368°W

Short Heath
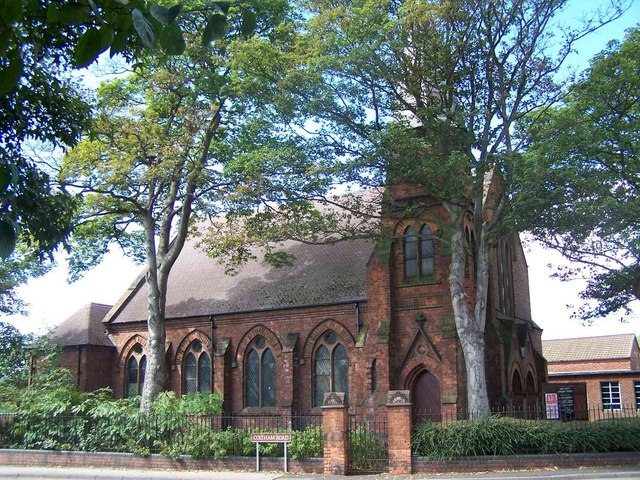
- Short Heath Methodist Church

- Location within the West Midlands
- Population: 11,374 (Short Heath Ward, 2018)
- OS grid reference: SJ976008
- Metropolitan borough: Walsall
- Metropolitan county: West Midlands
- Region: West Midlands
- Country: England
- Sovereign state: United Kingdom
- Post town: WILLENHALL
- Postcode district: WV12
- Dialling code: 01922
- Police: West Midlands
- Fire: West Midlands
- Ambulance: West Midlands
- UK Parliament: Walsall North

Short Heath is a residential area situated north of the market town of Willenhall, in the Walsall district, in the county of the West Midlands, England. Short Heath is a ward in the Walsall North constituency, and is bordered by the neighbouring wards of Bentley and Darlaston North, Birchills Leamore, Willenhall North, and Willenhall South.

The population of the ward is approximately 11,374, according to a mid-2018 ward-level population estimate published by the ONS.

The area contains housing developments, several schools, and a number of businesses and shops.

Short Heath also contains Rough Wood - a small woodland area, and Bentley Haye - an area of wet grassland, both forming part of the larger Rough Wood Chase Local Nature Reserve.

== History ==
The area's history consists, as is the case in much of the surrounding area, of collieries and mining.

In 1894 Short Heath became an urban district. On 31 December 1894 Short Heath became a civil parish, being formed from the part of the parish of Willenhall in Short Heath Urban District, on 1 April 1934 the district was abolished and merged with Willenhall, on 1 April 1966 the parish was abolished and merged with Walsall, Wolverhampton and Essington. In 1951 the parish had a population of 8043.

== Transport ==
=== Public transport ===
Short Heath is served by several bus routes operated by both National Express West Midlands and Diamond West Midlands. These routes connect Short Heath to nearby town centres and areas such as Willenhall, Walsall, and Bloxwich.

The nearest train stations to Short Heath are Bloxwich (BLX), Bloxwich North (BWN), and Walsall (WSL). Operated by West Midlands Trains (previously London Midland).

=== Road infrastructure ===
Short Heath is well connected to the main road network, such as the A462 which runs through the middle of the area, from Willenhall South to Willenhall North.

The M6 motorway runs along the eastern edge of the Short Heath boundary, with Junction 10 being approximately 0.7 miles away.
