= Walsall Museum =

Former museum in Walsall, England

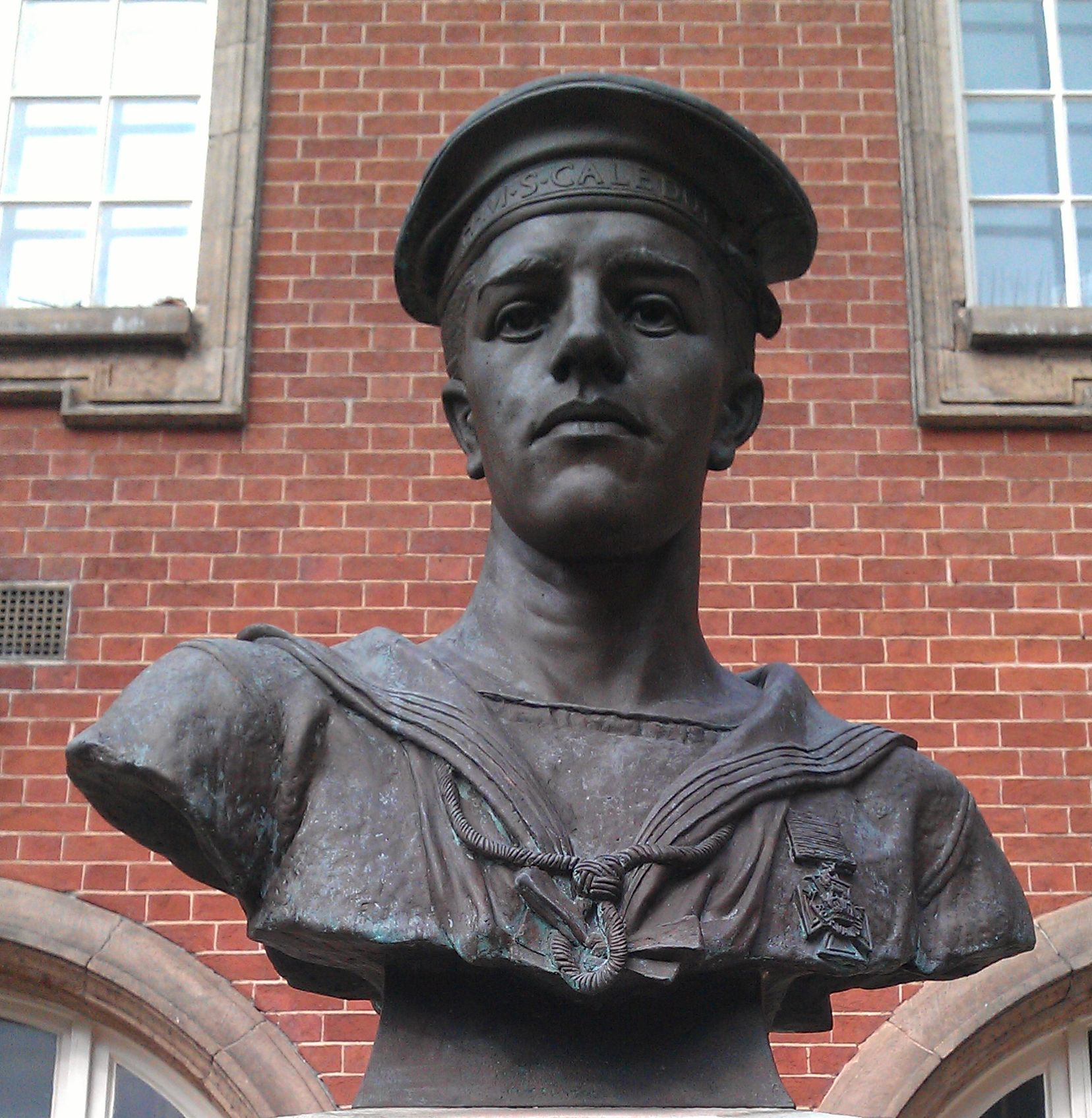
Bust of John Henry Carless VC outside Walsall Museum, England.

Walsall Museum was a small, local history museum located in the centre of Walsall in the West Midlands. The holdings of Walsall Museum ranged from seventeenth-century firemarks to twenty-first century posters. There was also a large collection of costume and textiles; notably The Hodson Shop Collection, a unique collection of unsold shop stock of working-class clothing dating from the 1920s to the 1960s. The museum closed permanently in March 2015. The collections were placed in secure storage and remain under the care of Walsall Council's Museum Service.

== Collections ==
Walsall Museum’s collection included products of local industries, particularly those of the nineteenth and twentieth centuries, as well as curios and costume.

=== Metalworking ===
A very large collection of lorinery, locally made locks, brass wares and chains.

=== Twentieth-century industry ===
Innovative stainless steel homewares made by Old Hall of Bloxwich, and Gaydon and Beetleware items made by BIP's Streetly Plastics, are represented in the collection.

=== Walsall at War ===
Objects from the First World War and Second World War, including gas masks and soldiers' equipment.

=== The Hodson Shop ===
The nationally significant Hodson Shop collection comprises the unsold stock of a small drapers' shop in Willenhall, and includes everyday clothing from the 1920s to the 1970s - the sort of garments that rarely find their way into museum collections.

=== Curios ===
The collection also included a scold's bridle; a preserved crocodile; and a preserved child's arm, found in a chimney at the White Hart Inn on Caldmore Green. The arm was discovered in 1870 and thought to be a 'hand of glory', but tests showed it to be a medical specimen that has been injected with the preservative formalin. It is known that a doctor was residing at the White Hart, but not how he came by the arm.

=== Local notables ===
There were also a few items relating to famous Walsall figures including the local author Jerome K. Jerome, the nursing pioneer Sister Dora and John Henry Carless, a recipient of the Victoria Cross in the First World War.
