= Hays plc =

British multinational recruitment company

- Type: Public
- Traded as: LSE: HAS; FTSE 250 component
- ISIN: GB0004161021
- Industry: Recruitment
- Founded: 1867
- Headquarters: London, England
- Key people: Michael Findlay (Chairman); Mark Dearnley (CEO)
- Revenue: ▼£6,421.2 million (2026)
- Operating income: ▲£48.6 million (2026)
- Net income: ▼£(58.2) million (2026)
- Website: www.haysplc.com

Hays plc is a British multinational company providing recruitment and human resources services across 33 countries globally. It is listed on the London Stock Exchange and is a constituent of the FTSE 250 Index.

== History ==
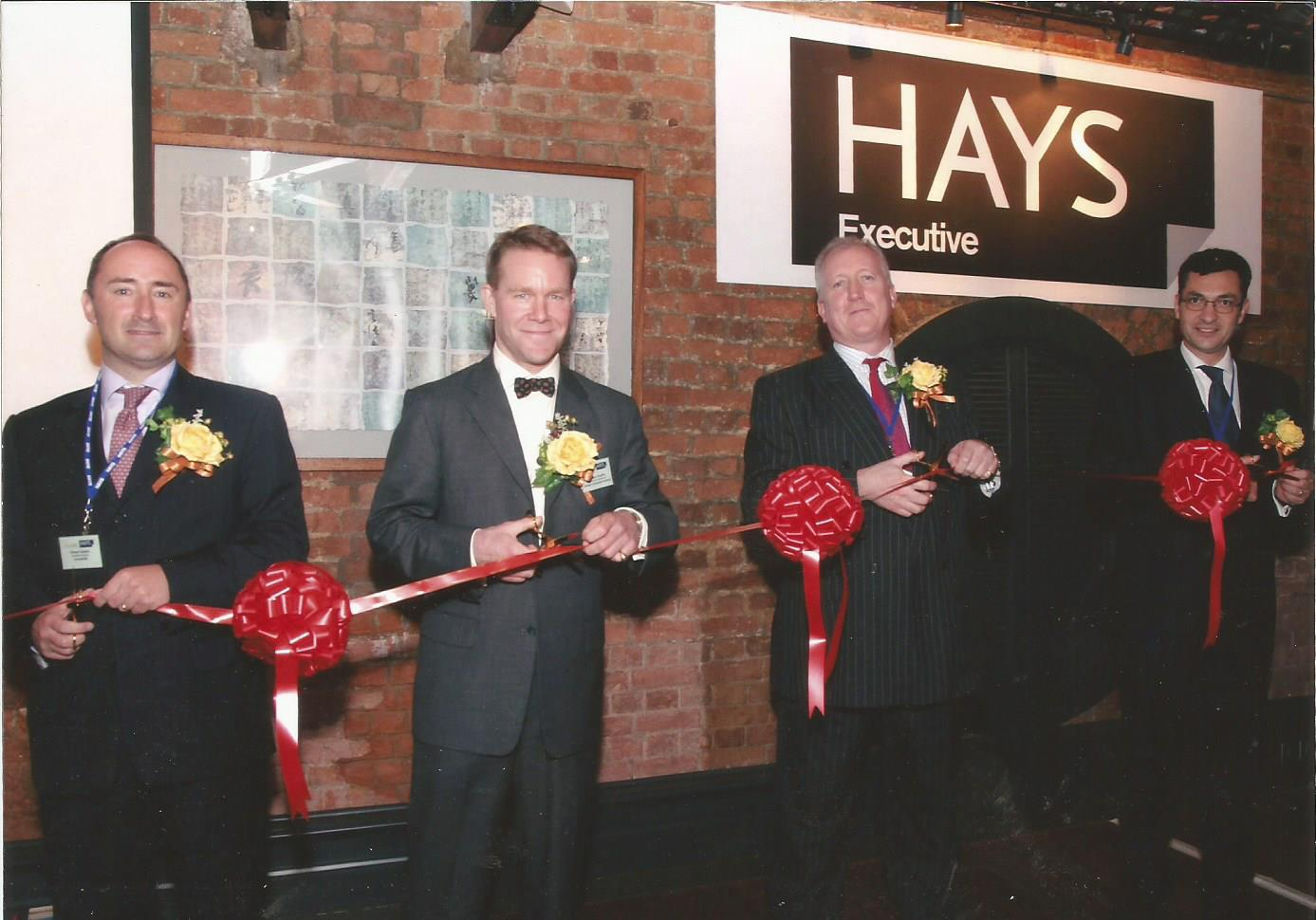
Event to celebrate Hays plc purchasing St. George's Harvey Nash, a Greater China recruitment firm founded by Nigel Cumberland and James Harris. Event held in Hong Kong's FCC in June 2006

The company was founded in 1867 as an operator of wharves and warehouses on the south bank of the River Thames. The name can be traced to Alexander Hay, who acquired a brewhouse there in 1651. It was redeveloped as a 'wharf', in fact an enclosed dock, in 1856 and renamed Hay's Wharf. It was rebuilt after the 1861 Tooley Street fire and still stands; it was converted in the 1980s into a shopping and restaurant area known as Hay's Galleria.

The Kuwait Investment Authority acquired an indirect 34% holding in the company in 1975, increased to 100% in 1980, chiefly to acquire the property assets on the south bank of the Thames, which were sold to St Martins Property Group in the early 1980s.

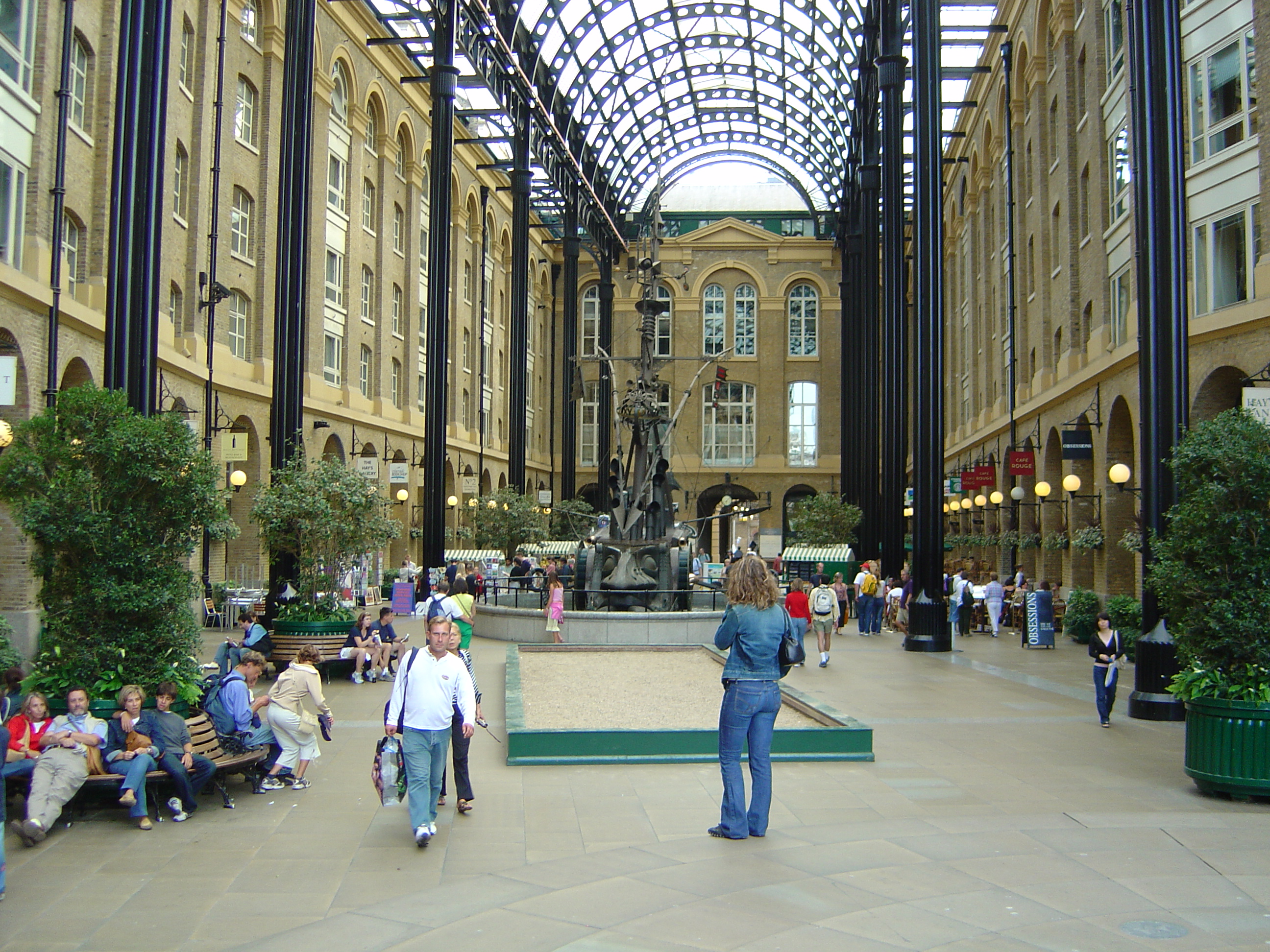
The former Hay's Wharf, which Hays sold in the early 1980s. It is now called Hay's Galleria.

To develop the management team for the services group, the Kuwaitis backed Hays' acquisition of Farmhouse Securities, a food distribution business owned by Ronnie Frost, and Hays then moved into chemical distribution, commercial distribution and office support services with Frost and Peter Roberts as directors. In 1986, it purchased a personnel business called Career Care Group, which had been founded by Dennis Waxman. Hays was also growing its business storage services which included the brands "Hays Wharf" and "Rentacrate". In 1987, a long-planned management buyout was completed, and the company launched an initial public offering in 1989. Ronnie Frost managed the combined services group from 1987 until he retired in 2001.

In March 2003, Hays announced that, following a strategic review, it intended to reposition itself purely as a specialist recruitment business and that the company would dispose of all non-core business, including its commercial and logistics operations. Following Hays' change of focus to a recruitment company, Denis Waxman became CEO in July 2004. In November 2004 Hays de-merged its DX delivery network which represented the final step in the transformation of Hays into a recruitment business. In November 2007 Waxman retired and was succeeded by Alistair Cox.

== Current operations ==
Hays is a specialist recruitment group with operations in the UK and Ireland, Continental Europe (in Germany pronounced Hei(s), as health=Hei(l)), the Americas and Asia Pacific regions. It has a fairly equal balance of work in temporary and permanent recruitment, which contributes to financial stability through business cycles. Hays operates in 33 countries.

== Involvement in price-fixing ==
In 2009 the Office of Fair Trading imposed a £30.4m fine against Hays for its involvement in price-fixing. The firm, along with five other recruitment firms, formed a cartel called the Construction Recruitment Forum which agreed to boycott Parc, a new company that had entered the market in 2003 to act as an intermediary between construction firms and recruitment firms. The six firms received fines totalling £39.3m, Hays receiving the biggest fine. Hays had its fine cut by the Competition Appeal Tribunal from £30.4m to £5.9m following an appeal against the level of a fine imposed by the Office of Fair Trading in September 2009.
