= Stebbing Shaw =

Stebbing Shaw (1762 – 28 October 1802) was an English cleric, local historian and topographer. He is remembered as a county historian of Staffordshire

== Life ==
Stebbing Shaw was born in about the spring of 1762 near Stone, Staffordshire. His father, also named Stebbing Shaw (died 1799), was rector of Hartshorne, Derbyshire. His mother's maiden name was Hyatt, and she owned a small Staffordshire estate, which passed to her son. He was educated at Repton School, and on 24 May 1780 was admitted as pensioner at Queens' College, Cambridge, where he made the acquaintance of Sir Egerton Brydges, who came up at the same time. He graduated B.A. 1784, M.A. 1787, and B.D. 1796, was elected scholar on 4 February 1784, fellow on 13 January 1786, and took orders in the Church of England.

About 1785 Shaw went to live at the house of Sir Robert Burdett, 4th Baronet at Ealing, to superintend the education of his grandson Francis. Brydges and he spent the autumn of 1789 in visiting the counties of Derby and Leicester, and in the summer of 1790 Shaw was in Sussex. He retired to his father's rectory at Hartshorne in the summer of 1791.

Shaw was elected fellow of the Society of Antiquaries of London on 5 March 1795, and on 27 April 1799 he succeeded his father in the rectory of Hartshorne. At the end of his life he was examining the topographical and genealogical manuscripts in the British Museum. When he died in London on 28 October 1802 he is said to have been insane.

== Works ==
In the autumn of 1787 Shaw and his pupil Francis Burdett made a tour to the western Highlands of Scotland. Shaw kept a diary, and he published it anonymously in 1788. He made a tour to the west of England in 1788, and published an account of his travels in the following year, having studied the mines in Cornwall. The book became popular, and was reprinted in John Pinkerton's Voyages and in William Fordyce Mavor's British Tourists (1798 and 1809).

The results of research by Shaw with Brydges appeared in the four volumes of the Topographer for 1789 to 1791 which they edited, and the magazine contained many of his illustrations. A continuation, called Topographical Miscellanies appeared in 1792, as seven numbers, forming one volume.

The first volume of Shaw's History and Antiquities of Staffordshire came out in 1798, and a fragment of the second volume was published in 1801. It contained many of his own illustrations, some of which had already appeared in the Gentleman's Magazine. A letter by Shaw was printed in John Pinkerton's Correspondence, and he assisted John Nichols in his History of Leicestershire.

== Notes ==
Attribution

This article incorporates text from a publication now in the public domain: Lee, Sidney, ed. (1897). "Shaw, Stebbing". Dictionary of National Biography. Vol. 51. London: Smith, Elder & Co.
