= Willenhall =

Market town in the West Midlands, England

Coordinates: 52.57980°N 2.06046°W

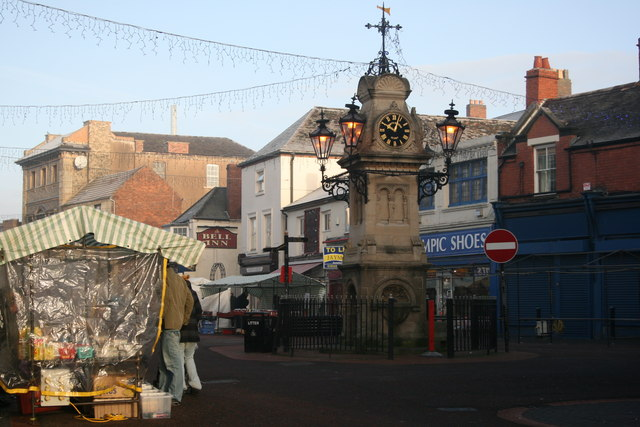
- Willenhall Market

- Flag

- Location within the West Midlands
- Population: 49,587 (2021 Census BUA Profile)
- OS grid reference: SO9698
- Metropolitan borough: Walsall
- Metropolitan county: West Midlands
- Region: West Midlands
- Country: England
- Sovereign state: United Kingdom
- Areas of the town (2011 census BUASD): List: Beechdale (part); Bentley; Dudley Fields (part); New Invention; Portobello (part); Short Heath
- Post town: WILLENHALL
- Postcode district: WV12, WV13
- Dialling code: 01902
- Police: West Midlands
- Fire: West Midlands
- Ambulance: West Midlands
- UK Parliament: Walsall North

Willenhall is a market town in the Metropolitan Borough of Walsall, in the county of West Midlands, England. At the 2021 Census the town had a population of 49,587. It lies between Wolverhampton and Walsall on the River Tame, and is contiguous with both Wolverhampton and South Staffordshire. The M6 motorway at Junction 10 separates it from Walsall.

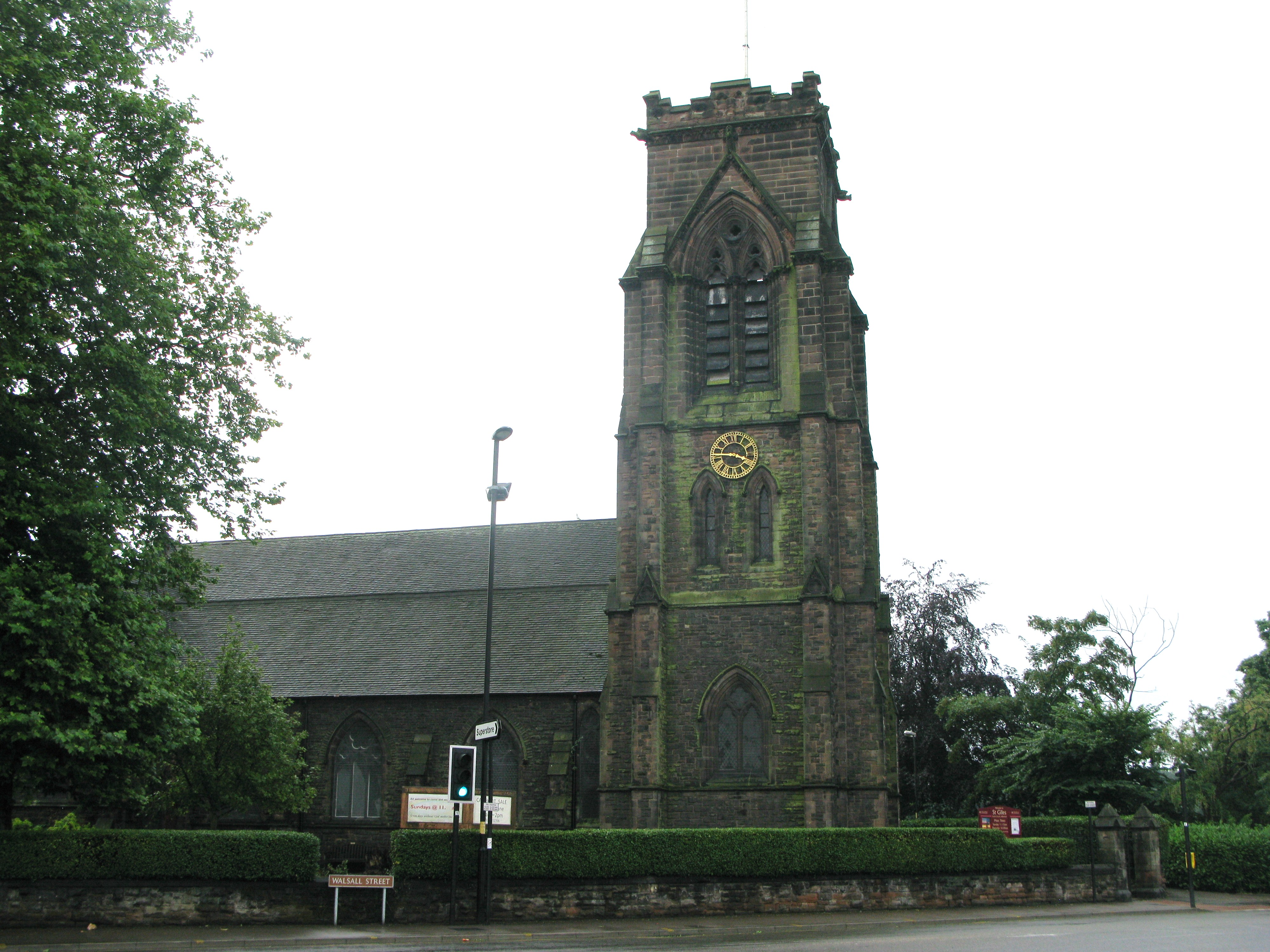
St Giles' Church, Willenhall's parish church

The town, formerly in the county of Staffordshire, is historically famous for the manufacture of locks and keys. As early as 1770, Willenhall contained 148 skilled locksmiths and its coat of arms reflects the importance of this industry to its growth. It was home to the National Union of Lock and Metal Workers from 1889 until 2004. Its motto is Salus Populi Suprema Lex – The welfare of the people is the highest law.

The urban district of Willenhall (established by the Local Government Act 1894) was partitioned in 1966 between the county boroughs of Walsall and Wolverhampton (since 1974 the metropolitan boroughs of Walsall and Wolverhampton).

The northern border of Willenhall has always adjoined open land, although the extent of Willenhall's expansion has meant in the last hundred years its northern border has been moved by about two miles.

== History ==
Willenhall has been described as "undoubtedly a place of great antiquity, on the evidence of its name it manifestly had its origins in an early Saxon settlement. The Anglo-Saxon form of its name Willanhale may be interpreted as 'the meadow land of Willa' – Willa being a personal name." Alternatively, the name may mean willow halh, the first element of it being the Old English wilgen 'of willows'. The Old English word halh meaning "a nook or corner of land, often used of land in a hollow or river bend."

The first record of the settlement of Willenhall is from the eighth century when a treaty was signed there by King Ethelbald of Mercia, in which Willenhall was referred to as Willenhalch. In 996 the town was referred to as Willenhale, and as Winenhale it was mentioned in the Domesday Book (1086) as a very small settlement, and it remained so until the growth of industry in the 18th century.

Coat of Arms of Willenhall Urban District Council, granted 10 April 1935.

During the 10th century, Willenhall was in the Shire of Stafford and The Hundred of Offlow (unit of a 100 villages), consisting of 30 households and a population of around 120. In the Middle Ages, Willenhall was included in the parish of St. Peter's Collegiate Church, Wolverhampton. Although there was a church in the village, people would have to travel to Wolverhampton for weddings and funerals. It was not until 1840 that Willenhall had a parish church. St. Giles was the first church to be built. The present church is the third on the site, dating from 1867. The River Tame flows through the churchyard and was until recent years one of the few places where the water surfaced.

Willenhall was a small agricultural village throughout the Middle Ages. From Tudor times, the natural mineral wealth began to be exploited with ore being sent out to charcoal furnaces in nearby Cannock Chase. The iron product was then returned to be turned into small metal goods. Nails were a common product and by the end of 17th century Willenhall had a healthy hand trade, making grid irons, curry combs, bolts, latches and coffin handles. According to the Hearth Tax Returns in 1665, Willenhall comprised 136 households and 894 persons and the largest building in the area was the Leveson Manor House. The population did not increase dramatically until the 18th century when iron and coal began to be fully exploited. The town grew up around the Market Place and Stafford Street with many tiny streets crammed with houses, workshops and pubs. Evidence of the town's growing prosperity is still visible today in the Dale House, once the home of the Hincks family, and 33 Market Place, the home of the Clemsons, both maltsters.

Willenhall suffered its very own great fire in 1659, when most of the town centre was devastated. Most common homes at this time were still made of wattle and daub with glassless wind-eyes (windows), properties easily razed by fire. Rebuilding where money allowed was in brick; The Bell Inn Public House being a good surviving example from 1660, although now closed for business and in the ownership of a local heritage trust (the Willenhall Townscape Heritage Initiative).

Willenhall's first workhouse opened in 1741 adjacent to what is now Upper Lichfield Street; it was in operation for 100 years before merging with Wolverhampton. By 1801, the population was 3,143.

Poor housing and lack of any proper sanitation led to a cholera epidemic in 1849 when 292 people died. Many of those who died were buried in the Cholera Burial Ground "on land at the bottom of Doctors Piece." A commemorative plaque at the site reads:

THE PARISH OF WILLENHALL WAS VISITED BY CHOLERA IN 1849.THE FIRST DEATH BY THAT DISEASE TOOK PLACE ON THE 17TH AUGUST, THE LAST ON 4TH OCTOBER. IN 49 DAYS 292 PERSONS DIED, THE CHURCHYARD OF ST GILES BEING TOO CROWDED FOR FURTHER INTERMENT, THIS GROUND, A PORTION OF THE CHURCH ESTATE WAS (WHILE YET UNCONSECRATED) FIRST USED FOR BURIALS ON THE FIRST OF SEPTEMBER. ON THREE DAYS THE BURIALS WERE 15 DAILY THE WHOLE NUMBER INTERRED HERE AND IN THE CHURCHYARD BEING 211.

The epidemic shocked the town into improving conditions, and in 1854 the Willenhall Local Board of Health was founded: to reflect a growth in civic pride, it established a library building in Clemson Street in 1866. The board was a forerunner of Willenhall Urban District Council which took over in 1894.

The memorial clock in the Market Place, Willenhall 2007

The clock in the Market Place was erected in 1892 by public subscription to the memory of Joseph Tonks, who was a doctor working in the town post-cholera. About the clock, Hackwood writes:

This was erected, as an inscription upon it testifies, as a memorial to the late Joseph Tonks, surgeon. "whose generous and unsparing devotion in the cause of alleviating human suffering" was "deemed worthy of public record."

Tonks brought both health and sanitation to Willenhall but died at the age of 35.

Willenhall was formerly a township in the parish of Wolverhampton, in 1866 Willenhall became a separate civil parish, in 1894 Willenhall became an urban district, the district contained the civil parish of Willenhall and from 1934 the parish of Short Heath. On 1 April 1966 the district was abolished and merged with the County Borough of Walsall and the County Borough of Wolverhampton, part also went to Cannock Rural District. The parish was also abolished on 1 April 1966 and merged with Walsall, Wolverhampton and Essington. In 1961 the parish had a population of 32,352.

=== 20th century ===
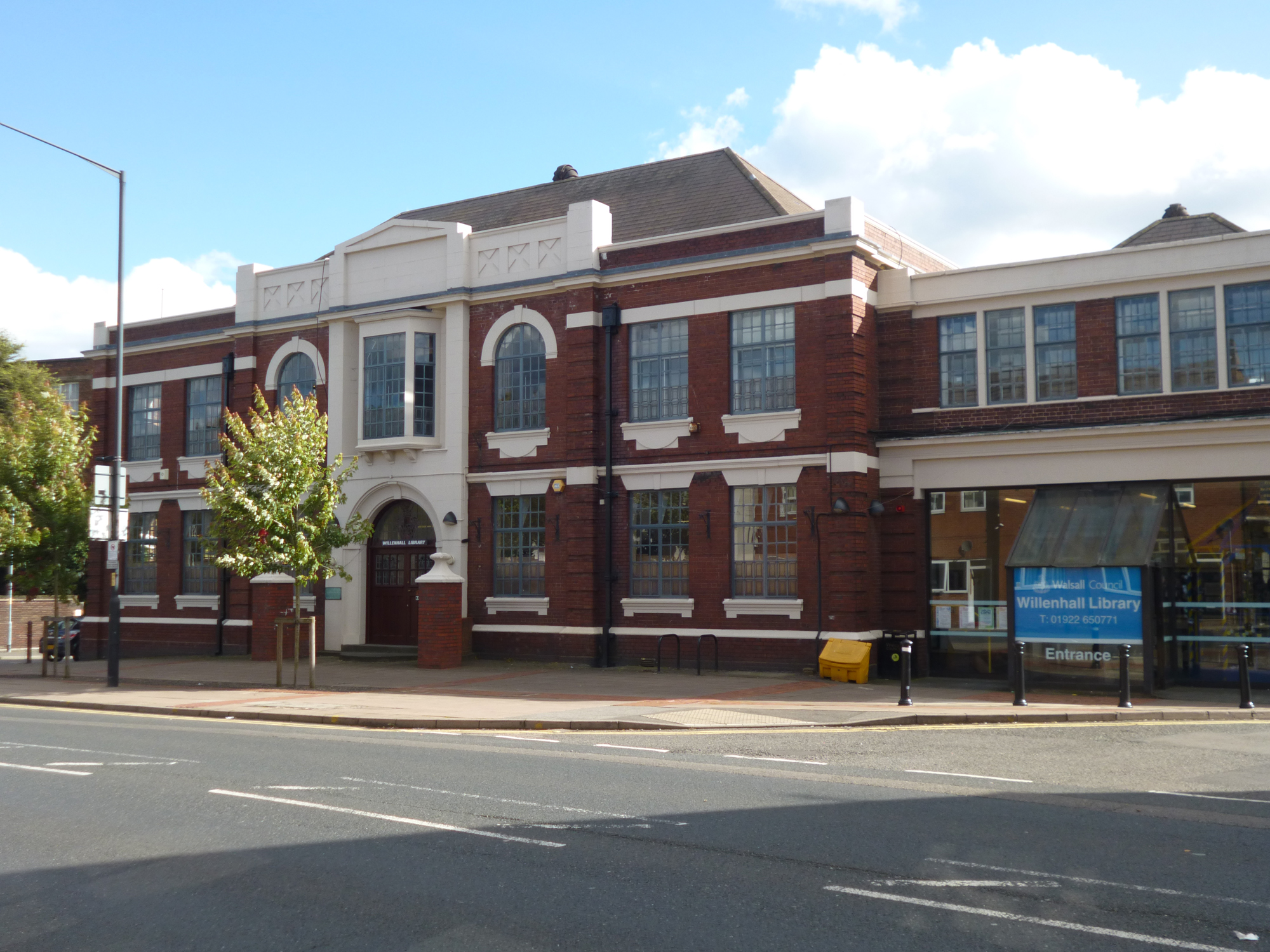
Willenhall Library (formerly Willenhall Town Hall)

By 1901, the population of "Willenhall, minus Short Heath" was 18,515.

Football came to Willenhall on 4 September 1905 when Spring Bank Stadium was opened in Temple Road, serving Willenhall Swifts F.C., whose first opponents in a friendly at the stadium were the Football League side Birmingham City. The club merged with Willenhall Pickwicks in 1919 to form Willenhall F.C., who achieved swift success as Birmingham and District League champions in 1922. However, the club soon fell into financial problems and went into liquidation in 1930. Spring Bank Stadium was sold and converted into a greyhound track, which remained open until 1980. It was demolished soon afterwards and replaced by housing.

Football returned to Willenhall in 1953 with the formation of Willenhall Town F.C., who played at a site on Noose Lane until 2013 and played in the local leagues until 2022. Since 2010, the Noose Lane ground has been owned by, and the home of, local league club Sporting Khalsa F.C.

Two war memorials were erected in the town after World War I to commemorate the hundreds of men from the town who lost their lives in the conflict. The memorial park was opened in 1922 in honour of those killed in that war.

The entertainment industry in Willenhall was boosted in 1914 by the opening of the town's first cinema, the Coliseum. It was followed a year later by the Picture House. A third cinema, the Dale Cinema, opened in the town in 1932. However, the closure of The Dale at the end of 1967 signaled the end of cinemas in Willenhall after 53 years. The building was later converted into a bingo hall and since December 1999 has been a J D Wetherspoon public house.

The growing population of Willenhall around the turn of the 20th century led to increased overcrowding and a need for new properties to be built. In 1920, the town's first council houses were built in Temple Road. Over the next 50 years or so, thousands of new private and council houses were built, mostly expanding on developments up to three miles north of the town centre. Willenhall Town Hall was completed in 1935 and public baths were erected in 1939.

Whilst functionally and historically Willenhall has always been part of, or associated with Wolverhampton, the majority of the town was made administratively part of Walsall County Borough in 1966, despite Willenhall Urban District Council recommending that the town should be administered by the then-Wolverhampton County Borough. The Report and Proposals for the West Midlands Special Review Area clearly states that this was not carried out against the principals of the review solely in order to make that authority area smaller. However, a percentage, mainly Portobello, came under the jurisdiction of Wolverhampton County Borough, and is now part of the City of Wolverhampton Council.

By the late 1970s, the local industry was in decline, and by the year 2000 most of the town's lock-makers had closed or relocated. The former Yale factory was demolished in 2009 and replaced by a Morrisons supermarket which opened in January 2010.

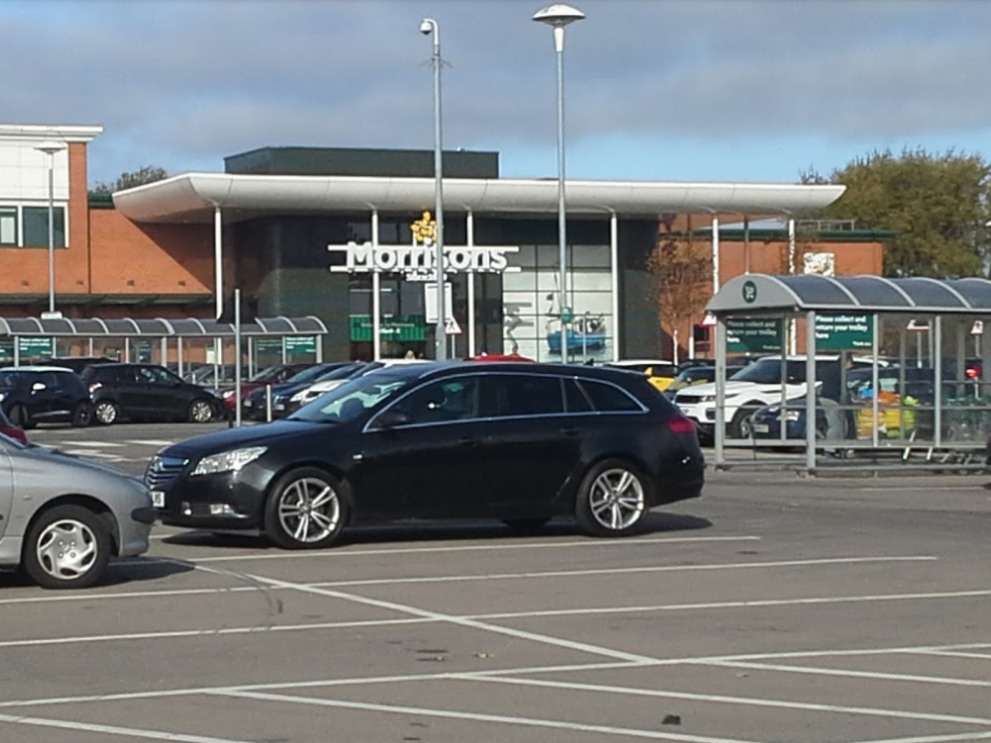
The Morrisons supermarket which replaced the former Yale factory.

However, the town's high street retains many of its old buildings which have been local landmarks since the turn of the 20th century or earlier.

== Future ==
"Much of the town centre is a designated conservation area and a £2.1 million bid for the Heritage Lottery funding is being prepared ... to fund enhancements to local buildings." So, within the next few years Willenhall Town Centre is set to undergo some regeneration. Currently the outskirts of the town centre are lined with abandoned factories, although most have been demolished and will be replaced with new flats. The part currently includes a Morrisons branch along with Lidl, Tesco and Spar within its borders.

There are plans to reopen Willenhall Bilston Street railway station to passengers in 2026.

== Parish churches ==
The town of Willenhall is the home of four different parish churches of the Church of England: St. Giles', St. Stephen's, St. Anne's, and Holy Trinity. St. Giles' did not originally have its own ecclesiastical district: before 1846 it was a Chapel of Ease to the mother church of St. Peter's, Wolverhampton. The chapel was for those who could not afford to go to Wolverhampton to worship, baptize or marry.

St. Giles' Chapel was the most ancient in the town of Willenhall. It was considered a chapel of ease before 1846 and was probably built "at the commencement of the 14th century." "The medieval church was demolished in 1748" because it began to decay from old age. The new church was completed in about two years and in 1750, the new church was again open for worship. In 1848, it became a parish church of the Church of England in Willenhall. St. Stephen's and Holy Trinity were finished in 1854, and St. Anne's was built about 10 years later.

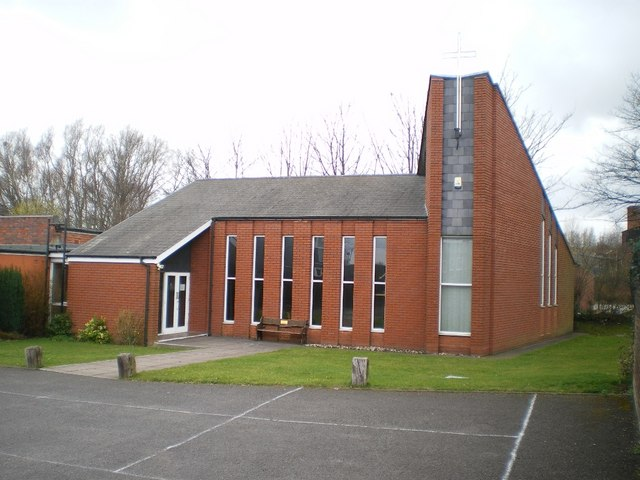
The church of St Stephen the Martyr in Willenhall

The Parish Church of St. Stephen is named after St. Stephen the Martyr. The church register began in 1848, but it took six years to fund the building of the church. After funds were raised, it was built and then consecrated on 31 October 1854. In the second half of the 20th century, the church began to deteriorate because of dry rot, and it was demolished in 1978. Because of the deterioration of the church, work began on a new church in January 1977, and it was dedicated on 8 September 1979. Many of the statues from the original church were brought into the new one.

St Anne's Church was also built as a chapel of ease in 1858, but it became a Parish church in 1861. "In the 1970s the church interior was turned around by 90degrees, a raised dais being built on the south wall, with a new altar, the old Sanctuary becoming the Lady Chapel." However, after restoration in the 21st century, most of the lead was then stolen from its roof.

Holy Trinity Church, in Short Heath, was consecrated on 25 July 1855. The parish of Holy Trinity had been established in 1846, and services were held in rooms in the area until the church, a sandstone building designed by W. Horton, was built. It was financed mostly by Daniel Bagnall, owner of the Coltham Iron and Coal Company, Mr Barnabas and Sons, and Joseph Samuel Junior. It has a nave, aisles a chancel, and a turret with one bell.

== Industry ==
Willenhall is famous for the manufacture of locks, and the Locksmith's House (The Lock Museum), dating from Victorian times, demonstrates how one particular family of lock makers lived and worked at the very beginning of the 20th century. This small museum is managed by the Black Country Living Museum and is open for pre-arranged group visits, including educational programmes for schools. The Locksmith's House is situated in New Road.

To make trading easier, the New Road (a toll road) was built before 1820, acting as an effective bypass for the main high street. Outside the town itself, settlements grew up around local industries. The area around Lane Head and Sandbeds had a thriving mining community and Portobello grew around the brickmaking industry. There was much coal mining in the Willenhall area until the 19th century when the industry came to a dramatic halt after a strike when the mines were flooded and lost forever. Lockmaking began in the area in Elizabethan times mainly in Wolverhampton, Willenhall and Bilston. Eventually it became concentrated in Willenhall, where lock making had begun as a cottage industry with many families producing locks and parts for locks in sheds or outhouses at the rear of their homes. Because long hours bending over their work tended to produce workers with humps on their backs, the town became known locally as 'Humpshire' and is still regarded as such with affection by many locals.

As late as 1956 there were still local men who had humps. Some public houses even had holes in the wall behind the wooden bench seats to allow their patrons to sit comfortably with their hump in the hole. Nearly all examples of such pubs have been lost. The Bell Inn in Market Street is an example of such a pub with curved holes in the walls to allow hump backed drinkers to sit up straight. Rushbrook's was a bakery in Market Street, Willenhall. In 1853, Rushbrook's struck their own "Rushbrook Farthing", a tradesman's token widely in use in the area. In the early 1960s, the Spring Vale Tavern in St Anne's Road was renamed The Rushbrook Farthing in remembrance of this unusual practice.

== Demography ==
At the 2021 census, Willenhall's built-up area population was recorded as having a population of 49,587 making it the second largest town in the Walsall Borough, after Walsall. Of the findings, the ethnicity and religious composition of the wards separately were:

: Willenhall: 2021 Census
Ethnic group	Population	%
White	38,301	77.3%
Asian or Asian British	6,184	12.5%
Mixed	2,043	4.1%
Black or Black British	1,887	3.8%
Other Ethnic Group	1,120	2.3%
Arab	33	0.1%
Total	49,587	100%

The religious composition of the built-up area at the 2021 Census was recorded as:

Willenhall: Religion: 2021 Census
Religious	Population	%
Christian	22,764	48.3%
Irreligious	17,218	36.6%
Sikh	4,937	10.5%
Muslim	1,103	2.3%
Hindu	655	1.4%
Other religion	327	0.7%
Buddhist	78	0.3%
Jewish	11	0.1%
Total	49,587	100%

The tables show that Willenhall is an ethically diverse town and has one of the highest Sikh populations in the West Midlands.

== Transport ==
=== Bus ===
Willenhall is well served by buses. The town centre lies on the 529 Bus route, which links Walsall and Wolverhampton running every 7 to 10 minutes on average during weekdays and every 15 – 30 minutes at other times, including evening and Sundays. Other local bus routes link the town to Ashmore Park, Wednesfield, Wednesbury, Darlaston, Bilston and Bloxwich as well as the local areas of Coppice Farm, Pool Hayes, Short Heath, Lodge Farm, New Invention, Bentley, Portobello and Lane Head.

There is no central bus station, although all routes can be accessed at two main points - the 'Market Place' stops and Lower Lichfield Street stop (near the Morrisons Store). These act somewhat as interchange points.

37, 41, and 529 bus routes are operated by West Midlands Bus, services 303, 310 and 326 are operated by Diamond West Midlands, services 25 and 57 are operated by Chaserider and services 23/23A are operated by Carolean Coaches.

=== Willenhall Railway Station ===
The first railway station serving the town was Willenhall Bilston Street, opened in 1837. Another, Willenhall Stafford Street, was opened later in 1872 but closed first, in 1931. Bilston Street was closed in 1965 amid the Beeching cuts.

The new Willenhall railway station reopened on 19th March 2026 alongside Darlaston.

=== West Midlands Metro ===
Willenhall is currently not served by the West Midlands Metro light rail network, but one of the numerous expansion plans for the system is the 5 W's Route, which would link Willenhall with Wednesfield, Wolverhampton, Wednesbury and Walsall and via Darlaston, Bentley, Reedswood, Birchills, New Cross Hospital, Walsall Manor Hospital and Heath Town.

Currently, there are some plans to create a line from Stourbridge to Wednesfield via Willenhall, however this is not planned to open or even start construction until at least the late 2020s, once the other 3 metro lines are open.

=== Road Infrastructure ===
Willenhall is about 10 minutes drive away from Junction 10 of the M6. Many main roads run through the area including The Keyway (which runs from Willenhall to Wolverhampton/Willenhall border) and the A454, The Black Country Route.

Due to its central location, Willenhall is home to the main hubs of Poundland as well as transport companies Aspray and DX Freight. Additionally, dairy firm Müller Milk & Ingredients has a depot in the Ashmore Lake area of the town.

== Landmarks ==
The main landmarks include The Locksmith's House museum in New Road; the cholera burial ground in Doctors Piece; St Giles Church; the bandstand in Willenhall Park; the Clock Tower, The Bell Inn, the malthouse (now Davey's Locker shop), and the Lock and Key sculptures in the market place; Dale House (now a restaurant) and the Dale cinema (now a Wetherspoon's pub); the Toll House (now a restaurant), and the old Town Hall (now the library) in Walsall Street.

== Education ==
Willenhall is home to three secondary schools. St Thomas More Catholic School is near the border of Bilston and Darlaston, Willenhall E-Act Academy (formerly known as Willenhall Comprehensive School, which moved from Bilston Road) and is now located on the town's Lodge Farm estate. Finally Pool Hayes Academy (formerly known as Pool Hayes Arts and Community School) is located on the town's Summer Hayes Estate. There is also Moseley Park School located on Moseley Road in Willenhall, near Portobello and Stow Heath Primary School.

For younger students in Willenhall there are numerous primary schools, these are:

- Fibbersley Park Academy – A recently built Super School located near Willenhall Park, made up of the merger of Clothier Street, Little London & Lakeside Primary now closed. Fibbersley Park Academy had an extension in 2016* increasing the year groups from 60 to 90 pupils.
- Short Heath Junior School, Rosedale CofE Primary School & Lane Head Nursery School – Three federated schools located on the outskirts of the Lodge Farm Estate & Lane Head.
- Barcroft School – The product of the recent merger of Elm Street Infants and Albion Road Juniors. Located near Willenhall Town Centre albion road and barcroft have been demolished
- Woodlands Primary – Located in the Short Heath area of the town, very near to Lane Head.
- Lodge Farm Primary – Located next to Willenhall School Sports College, very near the border with Bentley.
- New Invention Junior/Infants – Two high achieving schools located next to each other in New Invention
- Beacon Primary – A large school located in the middle of the New Invention Estate.
- St. Giles CofE Primary School – A combined nursery, infant and primary school located next the St. Giles church on Walsall Street in the town centre
- Pool Hayes Primary School – Located on the Summer Hayes estate. Not far from Pool Hayes Academy.

== Media ==
Local news and television programs are provided by BBC West Midlands and ITV Central. Television signals are received from the Sutton Coldfield TV transmitter. Local radio stations are BBC Radio WM, Heart West Midlands, Capital Midlands, Smooth West Midlands, Greatest Hits Radio Black Country & Shropshire, Hits Radio Black Country & Shropshire, and WCR FM, a community based station which broadcast from nearby Wolverhampton. The town is served by the local newspaper, Express & Star.

== Sport ==
=== Football ===
The town has two football clubs, Willenhall Town F.C. who play in West Midlands (Regional) League Division One and Sporting Khalsa F.C. who play in Northern Premier League Division One Midlands, after being promoted as champions in the 2020–21 Midland Football League.

In the 2005/06 season Willenhall won the Birmingham Senior Cup with a 1–0 win over Stourbridge. Their most successful period was in the early 1980s, when they reached the first round of the FA Cup in the 1981–82 season and were FA Vase runners-up in 1981.

Sporting Kalsha won the West Midland Premier League in 2014–15 and reached the 4th Qualifying round of the FA Cup, losing 3–1 at home to F.C. United of Manchester in front of over 2,200 spectators.

=== Rugby ===
Willenhall also has its own rugby union football club, formed by some employees of Rubery Owen in 1966. They are based in nearby Essington.

=== Greyhound racing ===
Willenhall Greyhound Stadium operated from 1932 to 1980.

== Neighbourhoods ==
- Short Heath
- New Invention
- Lodge Farm
- Poet's Estate
- Rough Wood
- Coppice Farm
- Portobello
- Fibbersley
- Allens Rough
- Little London
- The Crescent
- The Summers
- St Anne's
- Manor Farm
- County Bridge
- Summer Hayes
- Sneyd
- Scholars Heath
- Rose Hill
- Lakeside
- Park Side
- St Giles
- Lane Head
- Neachells

== Recreational Areas ==
- Willenhall Memorial Park
- Fibbersley Nature Trail and Reserve
- Rough Wood Chase
- The Summers
- Coppice Farm Open Space
- Old Bentley Canal walk
- Short Heath Park

== Twin towns ==
Willenhall is twinned with:

- Drancy, France. An alliance agreement was signed by the then mayors in charge, namely Chaiman. Williams and his French counterpart Mr Nilès at the City Hall of Drancy on 29 November 1959. In 2019, a Willenhall delegation was sent over to celebrate the Alliance's 60th anniversary. A road in Willenhall was named Drancy Avenue.

== Notable people ==
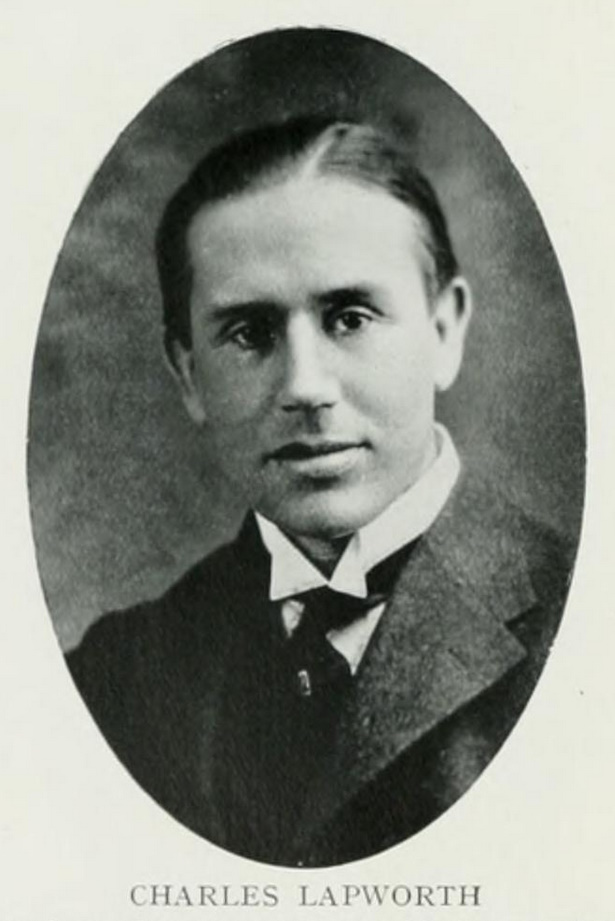
Charles Lapworth, 1922

- Richard Wilkes (1691–1760), antiquarian and physician, born and lived locally.
- Charles Lapworth (1878–1951), socialist activist, journalist and film promoter.
- Miriam Tildesley MBE (1883–1979), educator, anthropologist and museum curator.
- Rob Collins (1963–1996), musician brought up locally, the original keyboardist of The Charlatans.
- Louise Porton (born 1996), double murderer who formerly lived in the town

=== Sport ===
- Bert Bliss (1890–1968), footballer who played 270 games including 194 for Spurs
- Jack Southam (1917–1996), footballer who played 165 games including 145 for Northampton Town F.C.
- Jack Pitt (1920–2004), footballer who played 499 games, all for Bristol Rovers F.C.
- Frank Clarke (1942–2022), footballer who played 524 games including 188 for Shrewsbury Town F.C.
- Allan Clarke (born 1946), footballer who played 514 games including 273 for Leeds United
- Derek Clarke (born 1950), footballer who played 226 games including 178 for Oxford United F.C.
- Mark Davies (born 1988), footballer who played 218 games including 184 for Bolton Wanderers F.C.
