= Walsall Silver Thread Tapestries =

Series of eleven tapestries depicting the history of Walsall, England

The Walsall Silver Thread Tapestries is a set of eleven artworks in tapestries, designed by the artist Hunt Emerson in conjunction with the various communities of Walsall, England and hand-stitched by local people there in 2016. They depict the people, places, history and wildlife of the towns and districts that, since 1974, have formed the Metropolitan Borough of Walsall.

The works were commissioned with grant funding of £73,740 from Arts Council England to commemorate the 25th (or silver) anniversary of Walsall Council's Creative Development Team. The team was disbanded before the project was completed.

The tapestries are in three sizes: a large one for Walsall itself, six medium size and four smaller pieces. In total, they cover over 12 square metres (130 ft^{2}). Work was carried out under the auspices of Creative Factory, a community interest company.

In January 2017, they were exhibited at The New Art Gallery Walsall, and afterwards at several venues around the borough, including St Matthew's Church, libraries, and Walsall Leather Museum. As of 2019, the tapestries are exhibited at Walsall Arboretum Visitor Centre.

The work is dedicated to Maxwell Bailey, manager of the Creative Development Team, who secured the Arts Council grant, but died before the work was completed.

== The tapestries ==
Each tapestry depicts several subjects:

=== Aldridge ===
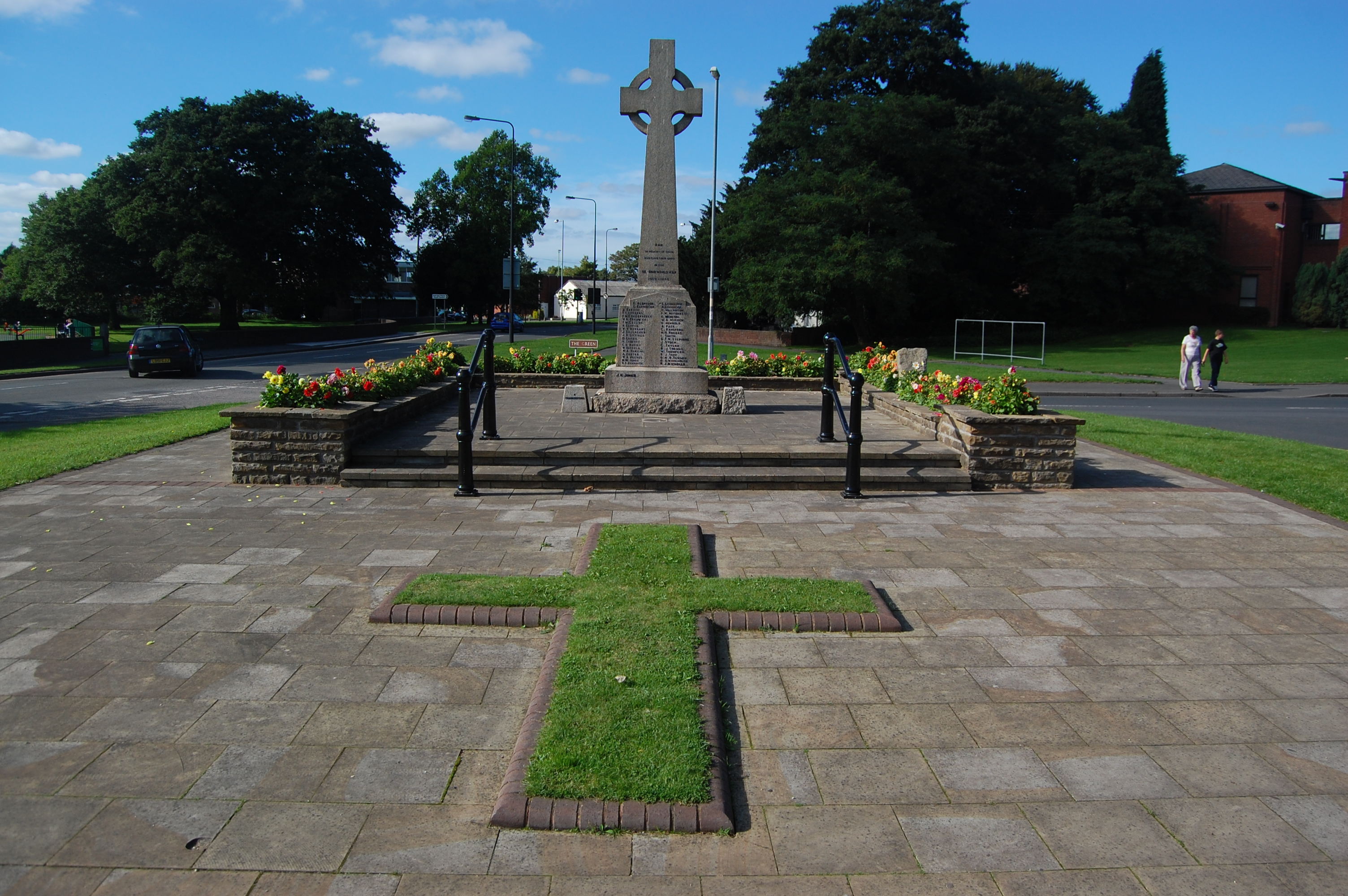
Aldridge war memorial

- Aldridge
- Aldridge in Bloom
- Aldridge War Memorial
- St Mary's Church and croft
- Old High Street, Aldridge, with a gold post box commemorating Ellie Simmonds
- Aldridge Airport and a Swallow Doretti automobile
- Aldridge Manor House
- The Elms, a public house
- The Avion, a cinema
- Rosie's walk, a charity event
- A brick from the Victoria Works
- Johnny Bullock, jockey
- Charles Holland, cyclist, and Charles George Bonner VC

=== Barr Beacon ===
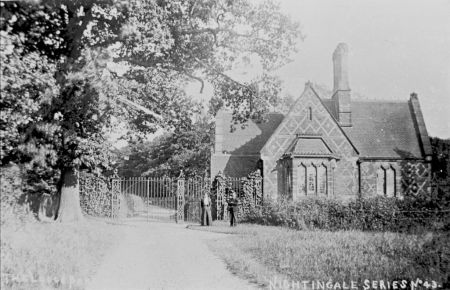
Walsall Lodge, Great Barr Hall

One of the smaller tapestries.

- Barr Beacon with stars
- Streetly, the BIP works there, and the latter's role as a World War II munitions factory
- Park Hall, Merrions Wood, and Great Barr Hall's Walsall Lodge
- Pheasey and a dimpled golf ball
- John Curry OBE, Olympic skater

=== Birchills ===
One of the smaller tapestries.

- Birchills and Smiths Flour Mill
- Reedswood Park swimming pool (demolished)
- Beechdale and Noddy Holder, who was born there
- Blakenall and the building of Walsall's first council houses, in 1920, at 94 and 96 Blakenall Lane
- Sir Harry Hinsley OBE
- Rob Halford of Judas Priest

=== Bloxwich ===
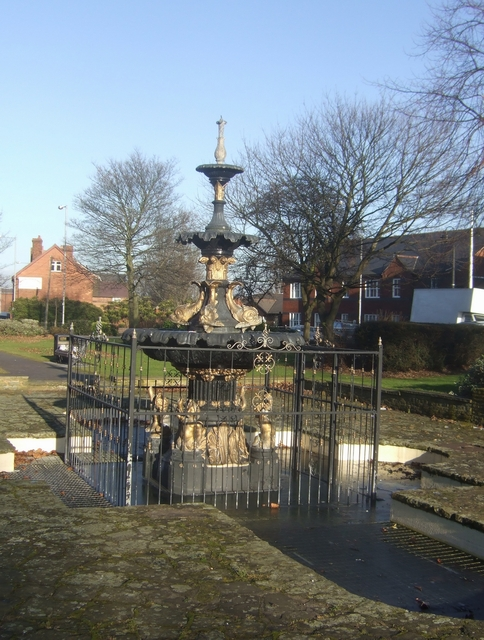
Bloxwich fountain

- Bloxwich
- Bloxwich Memorial Fountain
- A preaching cross
- Awl blades, needles and tacks, as manufactured locally
- Sailing dinghies on the reservoir at Sneyd
- Haymaking with a horse and cart, at Dudley Fields and Mossley
- The Showman cinema, latterly The Electric Palace
- The Royal Exchange, a public house
- The Bellfield, a public house
- Robert Plant and a Cavalier
- Sir Harry Smith Parkes
- Pat Collins, and one of his carousels

=== Brownhills ===
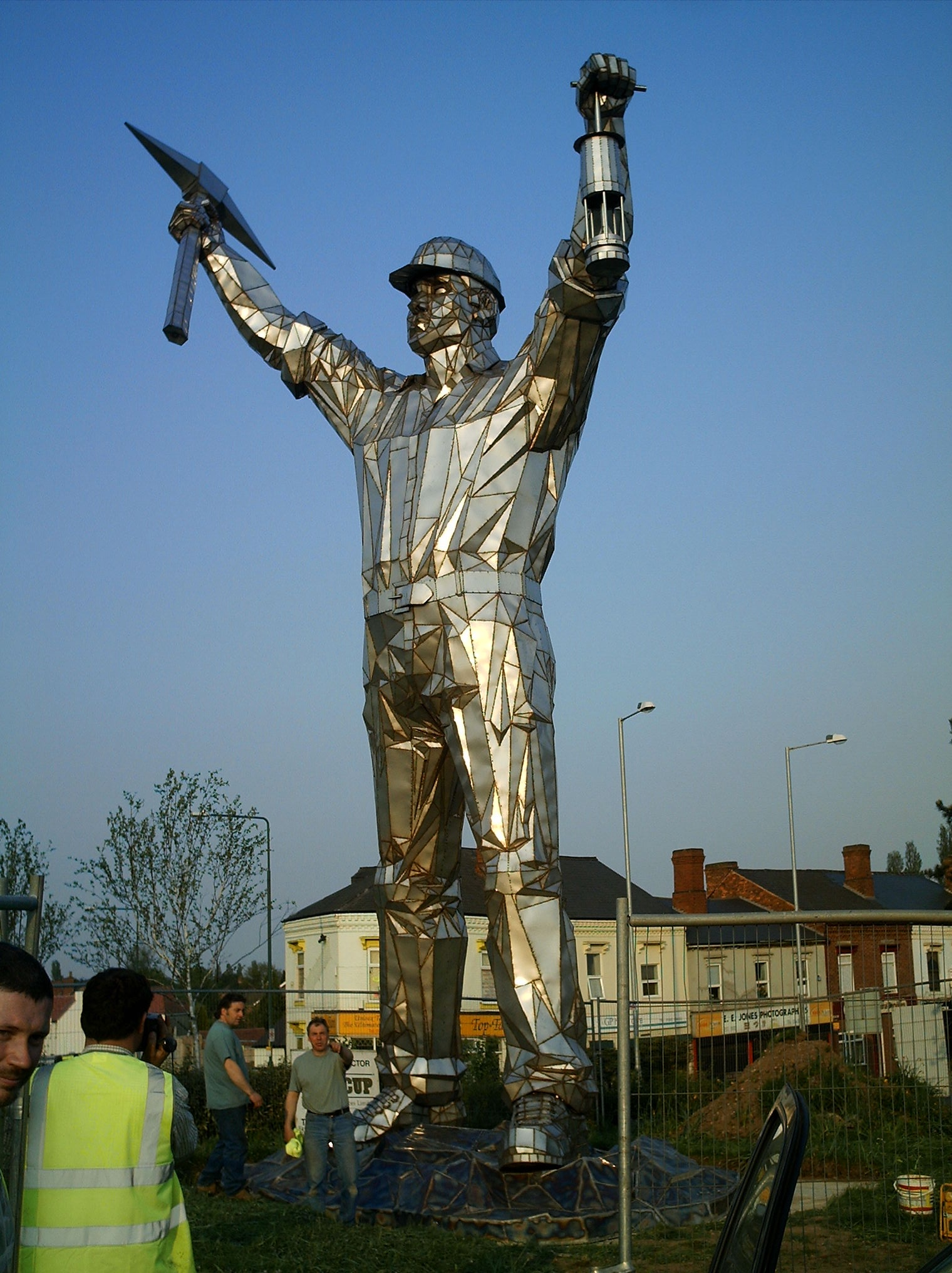
The Brownhills Miner

- Brownhills
- The Brownhills Miner, a large public statue by John McKenna
- Clayhanger Country Park, with a red deer stag, red fox and a hoopoe
- The Brownhills canal festival
- A clock, known locally as the three-faced liar, as it was said to never show the same time on each dial
- The Staffordshire Hoard
- Brownhills Memorial Hall, known as; The Memo
- Brownhills Activity Centre
- St James' Church at Ogley Hay
- Reg Morris
- Erin O'Connor
- Howdle the Butcher
- Wild flowers, a dragonfly and a blue tit

=== Butts ===
One of the smaller tapestries.

- Butts, and the archery butts from which it takes its name
- Walsall Wood
- Stubbers Green
- Shelfield
- Goscote and a public artwork there
- Coalpool and Ryecroft engine sheds
- Rushall Hall
- The Rushall Psalter
- Edward Leigh MP
- A bee

=== Pelsall ===
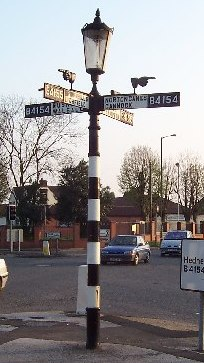
Pelsall's fingerpost

- Pelsall
- Knitted poppies
- Pelsall Colliery
- Pelsall Canal Festival
- A butcher's bicycle
- St Michael's Church
- Cilla Black attending the first 'Blind Date' wedding at St Michael's Church in 1991
- Pelsall's fingerpost
- Daisy Coates, a Pelsall postwoman of the 1960s
- Boaz Bloomer, proprietor of Pelsall Iron Works

=== Palfrey ===
One of the smaller tapestries.

- Palfrey and its statue of the type of horse from which it takes its name
- Chuckery and local firm Crabtree
- Highgate and its windmill tower
- Caldmore
- Pleck and its Hindu temple
- Bescot and the badge of Walsall FC, who are based there
- The White Hart, a former pub now residential flats

=== Darlaston ===
- Darlaston
- The statue of Saint George and the Dragon at St George's Church
- Rubery Owen, an engineering company, and the company's David Owen
- The Sanna, Moxley, site of a sanatorium ("sanna"), now a wildlife reserve, with a Staffordshire knot
- Bentley Cairn at Bentley Hall
- St Lawrence's Church
- The Columbarium, a listed building
- Nuts and bolts of the type manufactured by local companies
- Billy Muggins, a local peddler
- Jane Lane

=== Walsall ===
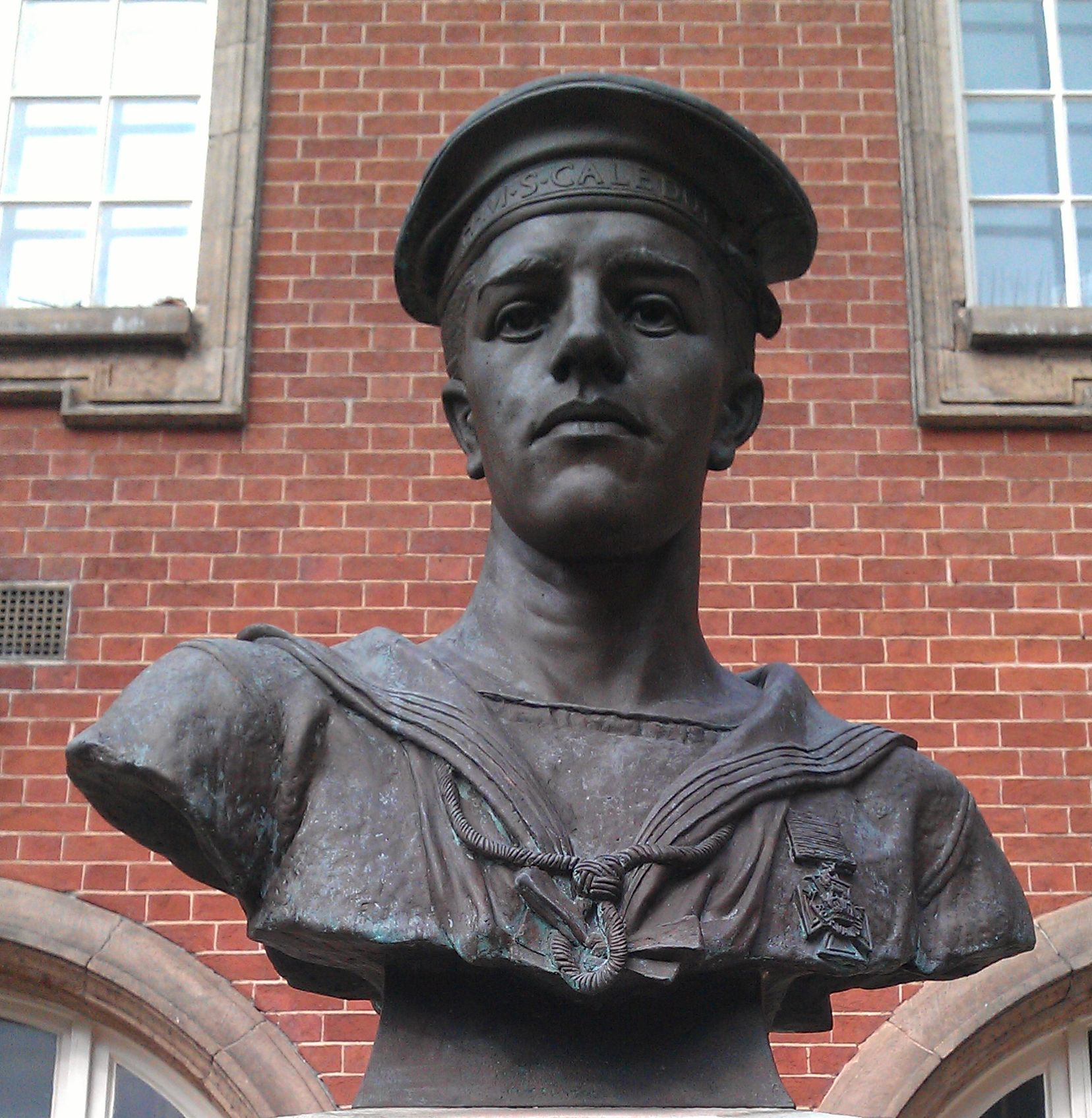
Bust of John Henry Carless VC

The largest tapestry. The central panel depicts:

- The Zeppelin raid of 1916
- A peregrine falcon
- Racing pigeons
- The town's statue of Sister Dora
- A reel of sewing cotton

This is surrounded by smaller panels, depicting (clockwise from top left):

- St Matthew's Church
- Walsall College
- The gatehouse at Walsall Arboretum
- Walsall Town Hall
- Walsall Library and Museum
- The New Art Gallery Walsall, with artworks by Braque and Yinka Shonibare, and a bronze bust of Kathleen Garman by Lucian Freud
- Leather goods
- A leather worker
- Jerome K Jerome
- Meera Syal
- Noddy Holder and Sidney Webster
- Goldie
- Bust of John Henry Carless VC
- The Concrete Hippo, a 1972 public artwork by John Wood
- A leather saddle
- Saint Matthew

This tapestry also carries Hunt Emerson's signature and a cartoon of Maxwell Bailey.

=== Willenhall ===
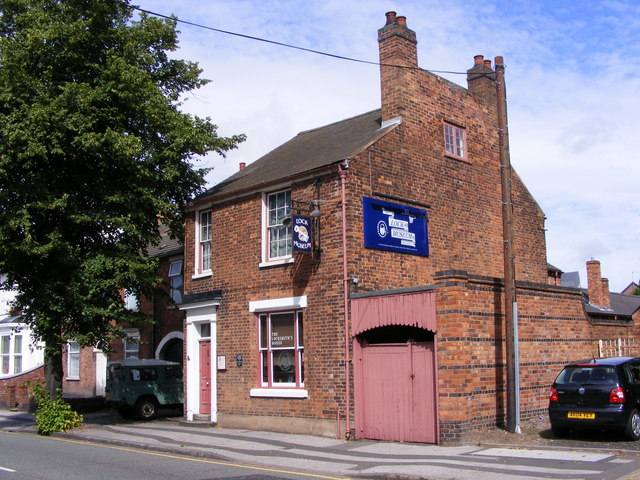
Willenhall Lock Museum

- Willenhall
- Willenhall coat of arms
- Willenhall clock tower
- New Invention and the Henry Squire & Sons' lock factory
- Henry VIII in Rough Wood, at Short Heath
- Willenhall Lock Museum
- Willenhall Guru Nanak Gurdwara
- The Bell, a public house
- Dr Joseph Tonks in a hot air balloon
- The Diamond Wedding of Derek and Julia Symmons
- Hilda Creanery and other local charity fund raisers
