= List of areas in the Metropolitan Borough of Walsall =

This is a list of areas in the Metropolitan Borough of Walsall, West Midlands, England.

- Aldridge
- Alumwell
- Ashmore Lake
- Barr Common
- Bentley
- Bentley West
- Bescot
- Birchills
- Blakenall Heath
- Bloxwich
- Brownhills
- Brownhills Common
- Brownhills West
- Butcroft
- Caldmore
- Catshill
- Chuckery
- Clayhanger
- Coal Pool
- County Bridge
- Daisy Bank is a residential area on the eastern outskirts of the town of Walsall; the Rushall Canal is nearby. It is served by National Express West Midlands no. 934 bus route. Engineer and philanthropist Samson Fox died at Daisy Bank on 24 October 1903.
- Darlaston
- Darlaston Green
- Daw End
- The Delves
- Druid's Heath
- Dudley's Fields
- Fallings Heath
- Fishley
- Fullbrook
- Gillity Village
- Goscote
- Harden
- Hardwick
- Heath End
- Highbridge
- Highgate
- High Heath
- Holly Bank
- Keyway
- King's Hill
- Lane Head
- Leamore
- Leighswood
- Little Bloxwich
- Little London
- Moxley
- New Invention
- New Town
- Old Moxley
- Paddock
- Palfrey
- Park Hall
- Pelsall
- Pelsall Wood
- Pheasey
- Pleck
- Pool Green
- Pool Hayes
- Reedswood
- Rough Hay
- Rushall
- Ryecroft
- Shelfield
- Shepwell Green
- Shire Oak
- Short Heath
- Spring Bank
- Streetly
- Stubbers Green
- Tamebridge
- Vigo
- Wallington Heath
- Walsall
- Walsall Wood
- Willenhall
- Woods Bank
