= St Martin's Church, Walsall =

St Martin’s Church, Walsall
- Parish Church of St Martin
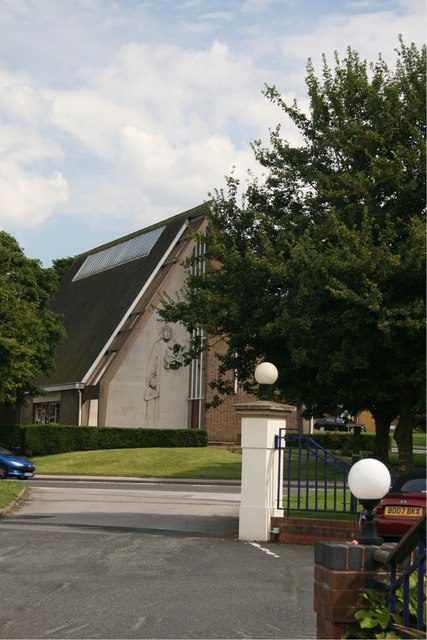
- St Martin’s Church, Walsall
- St Martin’s Church, Walsall
- 52°34′42.1″N 1°56′42.22″W
- OS grid reference: SP 03819 97838
- Location: Walsall
- Country: England
- Denomination: Church of England
- Churchmanship: Open Evangelical
- Website: www.stmartinswalsall.org

History
- Dedication: St Martin of Tours
- Consecrated: 22 October 1960

Architecture
- Completed: 1960

Administration
- Province: Canterbury
- Diocese: Lichfield
- Archdeaconry: Walsall
- Deanery: Walsall
- Parish: Walsall Saint Martin

Clergy
- Vicar: The Revd Jenny Mayo

St Martin's Church is situated in the West Midlands town of Walsall on the corner of Sutton Road and Daffodil Road.

St Martin's is an Anglican parish, in the Deanery of Walsall and Diocese of Lichfield. The church is named after St Martin of Tours. The parish of St Martin's principally serves three large suburban housing estates, Orchard Hills, Brookhouse and Park Hall Estates in Walsall.

== History ==
St Martin's was initially a church plant of St Matthew's Church in Walsall, under the leadership of the Reverend Vernon Nicholls, Vicar of St Matthew's, and later Bishop of the Diocese of Sodor and Man. Prior to the construction of the present church building, the congregation worshipped in the Red House Pub (now the Longhorn).

The church stands on land that once belonged to the family of Mary Stanley, a site that was formerly occupied by the Stanley family home, which was demolished in error instead of the old Three Crowns pub, further up the Sutton Road. The two yew trees that flank the front pathway once stood in the garden.

The church building was consecrated by the Bishop of Lichfield, the Right Reverend Arthur Streetton Reeve, on Saturday 22 October 1960. The building has a distinctive A frame design, and features a large carving of Christ with the children, by Raymond Forbes Kings.

St Martin's was a daughter church to St Matthew's, and its ministers were originally curates from St Matthew's. In 1975 St Martin's was granted its own incumbent, and in September 1977 St Martin's became a district church, responsible for its own affairs, with a resident minister living in the newly constructed St Martin's House.

On 13 December 1987 a Team Ministry was inaugurated, consisting of St Matthew's, St Martin's and St Luke's, with a Team Rector and two Team Vicars. In 2011 the Team Ministry was disbanded, and St Martin's became an independent parish in its own right.

The churchmanship of St Martin's is Open Evangelical.

== Clergy of St. Martin's ==
=== Curates ===
- Charles Lovell October 1960 – April 1963
- Arthur Mawson September 1963 – March 1966
- Colin Fuller March 1966 – October 1967
- Donald Felix November 1967 – September 1968
- Geoffrey Holden September 1968 – May 1971
- Philip Hills May 1971 – September 1972
- Colin Sneyd October 1972 – November 1975
- Keith Wyer March 1976 – September 1977

=== Resident Ministers ===
- Keith Wyer September 1977 – August 1979
- Richard Sutton September 1979 – April 1983
- John Sharpe September 1983 – December 1987

=== Team Vicars ===
- John Sharpe December 1987 – September 1996
- Peter Hart June 1997 – July 2003
- Simon Bickersteth October 2005 - January 2011

=== Vicars ===
- Simon Bickersteth January 2011 – August 2016
- Jenny Mayo March 2017 – present

Non Stipendiary Curates

- Phill Ball June 2009 – July 2016
- Sue Phillips June 2022 – present
