= Sister Dora =

19th-century nurse

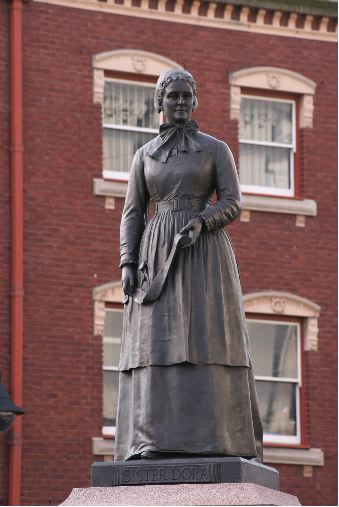
- Statue of Sister Dora, Walsall town centre
- Born: Dorothy Wyndlow Pattison; 16 January 1832; Hauxwell, North Riding of Yorkshire,
- Died: 24 December 1878 (aged 46); Walsall, Staffordshire
- Education: (Christ Church sisterhood) Community of the Holy Rood
- Occupation: Nurse
- Parent(s): Mark James Pattison and Jane Winn

Dorothy Wyndlow Pattison, better known as Sister Dora (16 January 1832 – 24 December 1878), was an Anglican nun and nurse who worked in Walsall, Staffordshire.

== Life ==
Dorothy Wyndlow Pattison was born in Hauxwell, North Riding of Yorkshire, the eleventh of the twelve children of the rector, Reverend Mark James Pattison (1788-1865) and his wife, Jane (née Winn; 1793-1860) Pattison. One of her siblings was the scholar Mark Pattison. Her childhood was overshadowed by the illness of her domineering father. Only his sons received an education but Dorothy was taught by her brother Mark. In 1856, she became secretly engaged to James Tate, the son of James Tate, headmaster of Richmond School. The Tates were one of the few families with whom the Pattisons had social contact. At the same time she also developed feelings for another man, Purchas Stirke. After her mother's death in 1860, she broke off her relationships with both men. She was able to leave home due to a £90 bequest from her mother. From 1861 to 1864, she ran the village school at Little Woolstone, Buckinghamshire.

In late 1864, she joined the Christ Church sisterhood (known as "Good Samaritans" and which became the Community of the Holy Rood) at Coatham, near Redcar, North Yorkshire. She adopted the name of Sister Dora.

In 1865, she was sent to Walsall to work as a relief nurse in a small cottage hospital and would devote the remainder of her life to nursing. She was sent by the sisterhood to work at the hospital in Bridge Street and arrived in Walsall on 8 January 1865. The rest of her life was spent in Walsall. She worked at the Cottage Hospital at The Mount until 1875, when Walsall was hit by smallpox. She worked for six months at an epidemic infirmary set up in Deadman's Lane (now Hospital Street), treating thousands of patients. During the last two years of her life, she worked at the hospital in Bridgeman Street, overlooking the South Staffordshire Railway (later the London and North Western Railway). She developed a special bond of friendship with railway workers who often suffered in industrial accidents. In 1871, these labourers gave her a pony and a carriage, and even raised the sum of £50 from their own wages, to enable her to visit housebound patients more easily.

Sister Dora trained nurses at Walsall, among them Louisa McLaughlin. One of people she influenced was the orphan Kate Hill who was impressed by the calm way Sister Dora cared for miners. Hill emigrated with her sister to Australia in 1879; she opened her own hospital in Adelaide and started a branch of the Australasian Trained Nurses' Association.

== Death and legacy ==
In 1877, Sister Dora was diagnosed with breast cancer. She died on Christmas Eve 1878, aged 46. At her funeral on 28 December, the town of Walsall turned out to see her off to Queen Street Cemetery, borne by eighteen railwaymen, engine drivers, porters and guards.

=== Legacy ===
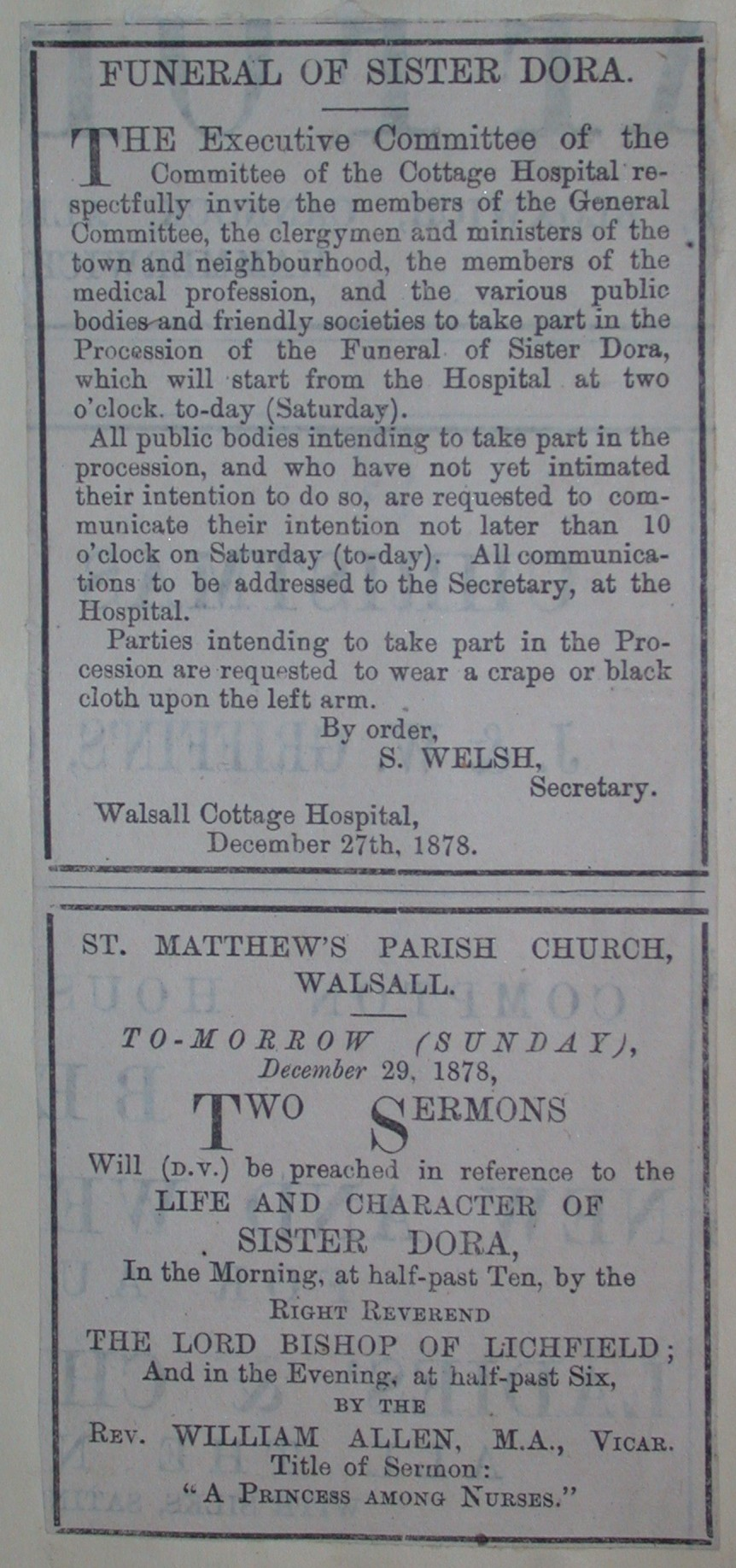
Two press clippings, noting the funeral and memorial arrangements for Sister Dora

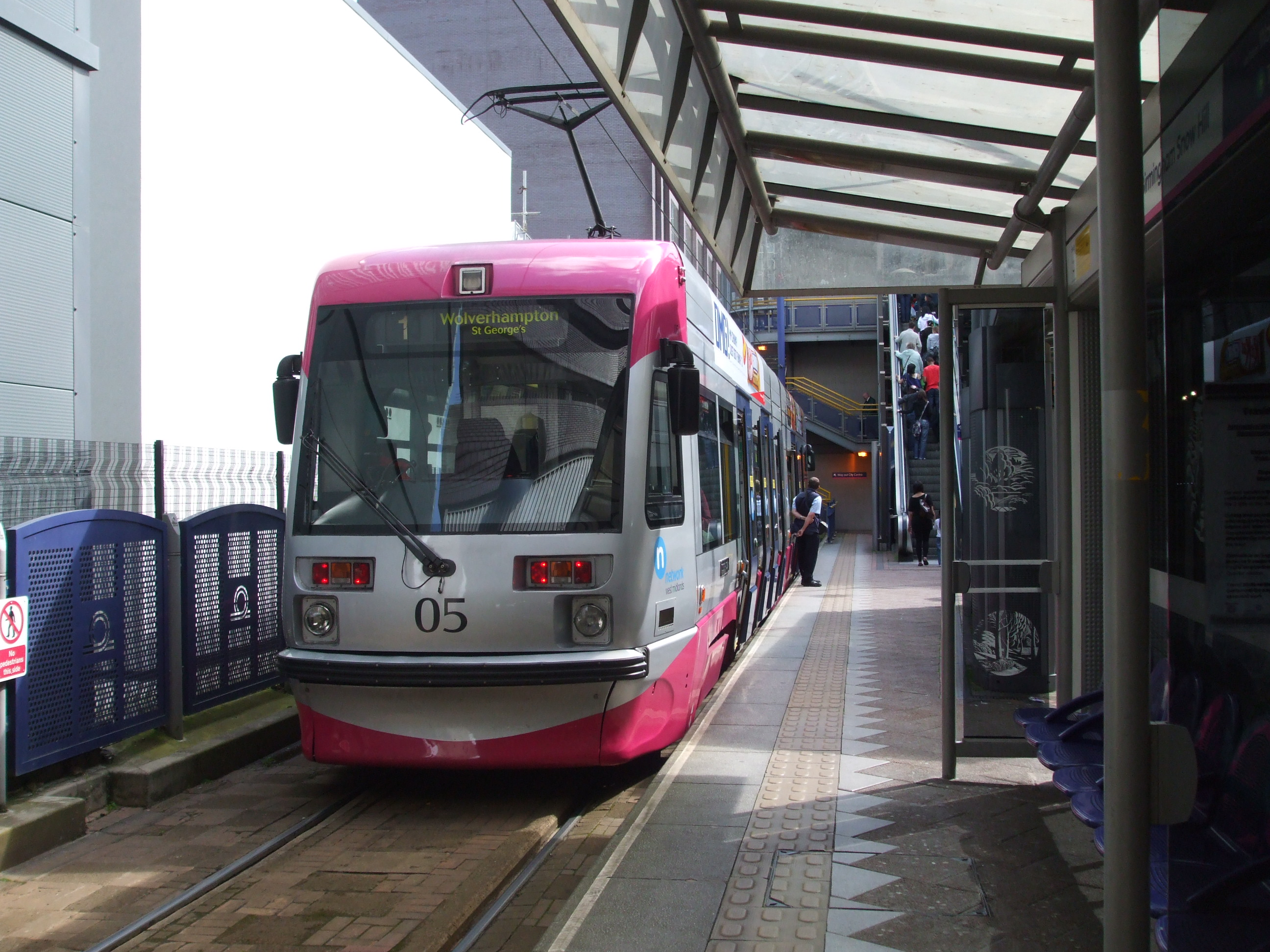
Former Midland Metro tram 05 with "Sister Dora" nameplate below the first passenger window

- In 1882, a stained glass window at St Matthew's Church, Walsall, was dedicated to her.
- In October 1886, a statue of Sister Dora by Francis John Williamson was unveiled in Walsall. Florence Nightingale was invited to unveil the statue but had to decline from sickness; she sent a tribute with her regrets.
- A posthumous portrait of Sister Dora by George Phoenix has been preserved at Wolverhampton Art Gallery.
- The former Walsall General Hospital was renamed Walsall General (Sister Dora) Hospital. It has now been largely demolished in the rearrangement of the town's provision of health services, but Sister Dora's name is still perpetuated in the new hospitals. The provision for outpatients at Walsall Manor Hospital is named Sister Dora Outpatients Department. In Alumwell Close, Walsall, behind the Manor Hospital is a Mental Health Hospital which has been dedicated to Sister Dora. 'Dorothy Pattison Hospital' cares for Mental Health patients and is run by the Black Country Healthcare NHS Foundation Trust. The buildings of Walsall General are gone but it is commemorated by the street named "Sister Dora Gardens". Nurses trained in the 1950s reported wearing caps they referred to as "Sister Doras".
- The London & North Western Railway's chief mechanical engineer, Francis William Webb, named many of his engines. It was announced in January 1895 that he planned to name a 2-4-0 passenger locomotive, a rebuild of a Precedent Class 'Jumbo', as No. 2158 'Sister Dora'. A working miniature version of this locomotive (to run on seven and a quarter-inch gauge track) ran for a short time in the 1980s on the Walsall Steam Railway in Walsall Arboretum. The Walsall Steam Railway also regularly hauled passenger trains with a miniature LMS Black 5 4-6-0 built in 1981 number 5000 and this carried the name 'Sister Dora', too (though the prototype 5000 never did). It remains in service at the Great Cockcrow Railway, still named. British Rail Class 31 diesel locomotive 31 430 (now in preservation) was named after her. Several models of this locomotive have been produced in both 00 and N scales. Later British Rail Class 37 diesel loco 37 116 (preserved, now reinstated) received the name from the Class 31.
- Midland Metro named an AnsaldoBreda T-69 tram in her honour. It has since been withdrawn from service, along with the rest of its class, and scrapped.
- The main road through the village of Woolstone, Milton Keynes, where she ran the village school from 1861 to 1864, is called Pattison Lane.
- Sister Dora Gardens in Caldmore and Dora Street in Pleck are named for her.
- A building at Walsall Campus, University of Wolverhampton is named in her honour.

== Sources ==
Biography abot Sister Dora writted by Margared Lonsdale

- Probert, Miss W R, "Walsall's Own 'Lady with the lamp'", The Blackcountryman Spring 2007, Vol. 40 No. 2, pg. 51; ISSN 0006-4335
- Watkin, B., "Sister Dora of Walsall (Dorothy Pattison)", Nursing Mirror (23 June 1977; 144(25): 7-9)
- Price, Millicent, "Inasmuch As...", The Story of Sister Dora of Walsall Society for Promoting Christian Knowledge (1952). Millicent Price in her book refers to a biography of Sister Dora written by one Margaret Lonsdale and published during the 1880s "It ran into 39 editions and was included in the Tauchnitz library" but provides little detail and refers to "bitter" criticism of the writer by Sister Dora's colleagues and family. Price also refers to Ellen Ridsdale, "a Walsall woman bound to Sister Dora through years of close friendship" who published a pamphlet about sister Dora and comments, "The Lonsdale book and the Ridsdale pamphlet and a few newspaper cuttings are all the records now available" [to anyone researching the life of Sister Dora]
- Lonsdale, Margaret, Sister Dora, London, Kegan Paul, 1895
- Ridsdale, Ellen M M, Sister Dora: Personal Reminiscence of her Later Years, with some of her Letters, Walsall, Griffin, 1880
- Manton, Jo, Sister Dora: A Life of Dorothy Pattison, London, Methuen, 1971; ISBN 0416109004 / ISBN 978-0416109009
