= Highgate, West Midlands =

Highgate, West Midlands may refer to:

- Highgate, Birmingham
- Highgate, Walsall
