= Walsall =

Town in the West Midlands, England

Coordinates: 52.58°N 1.98°W

- Town
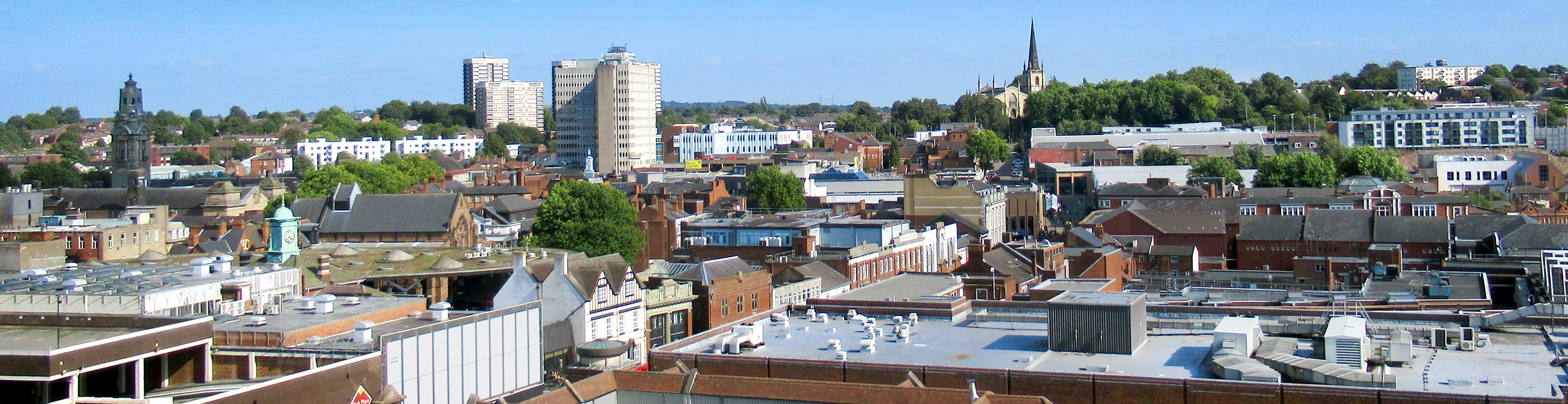
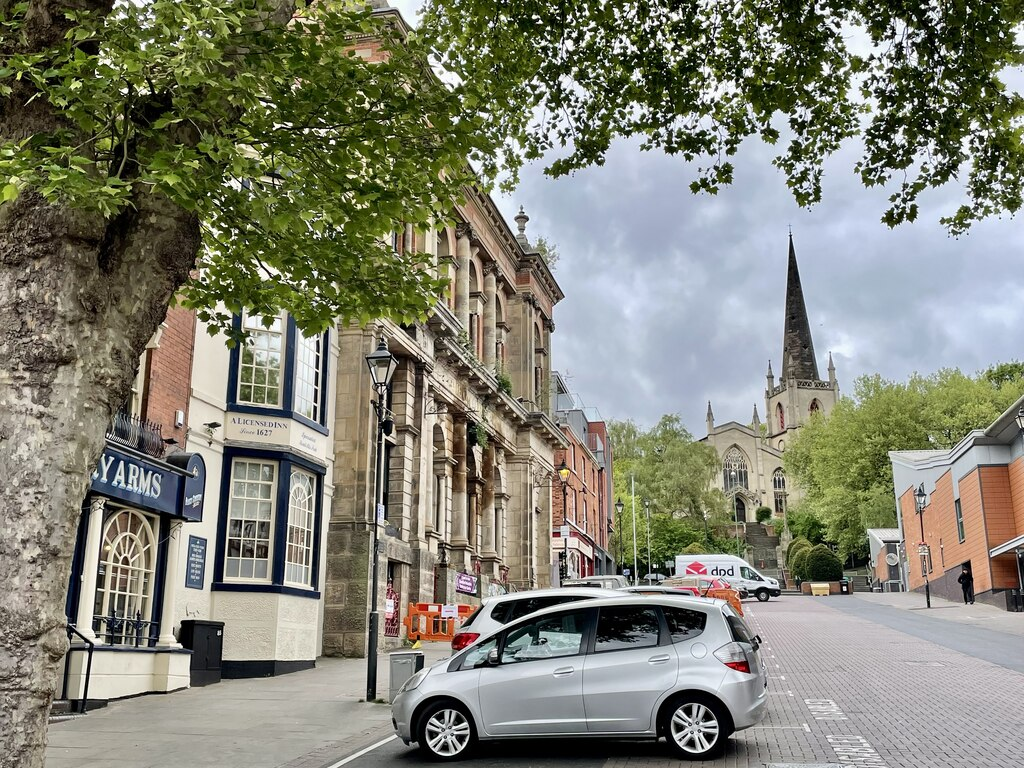
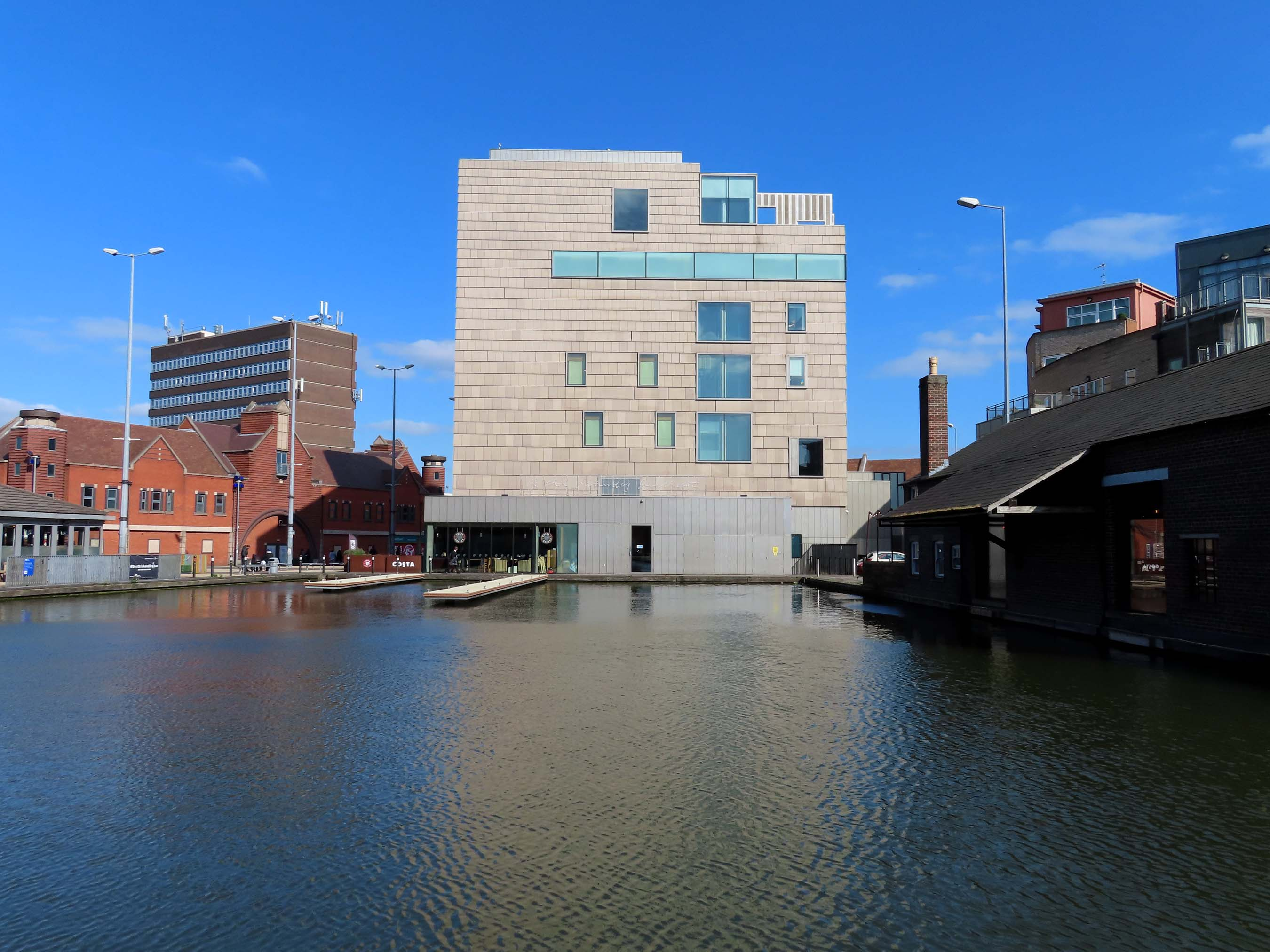
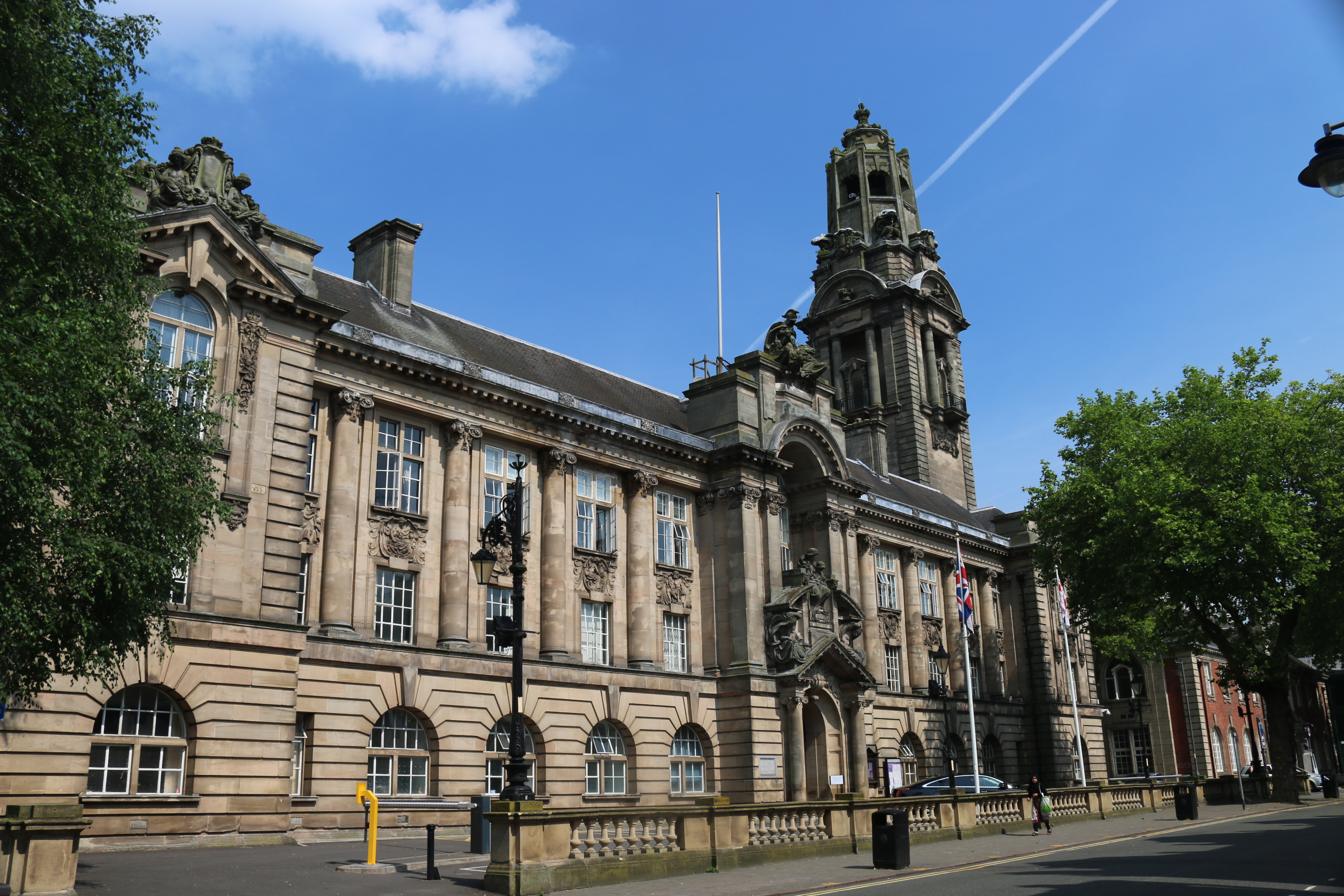
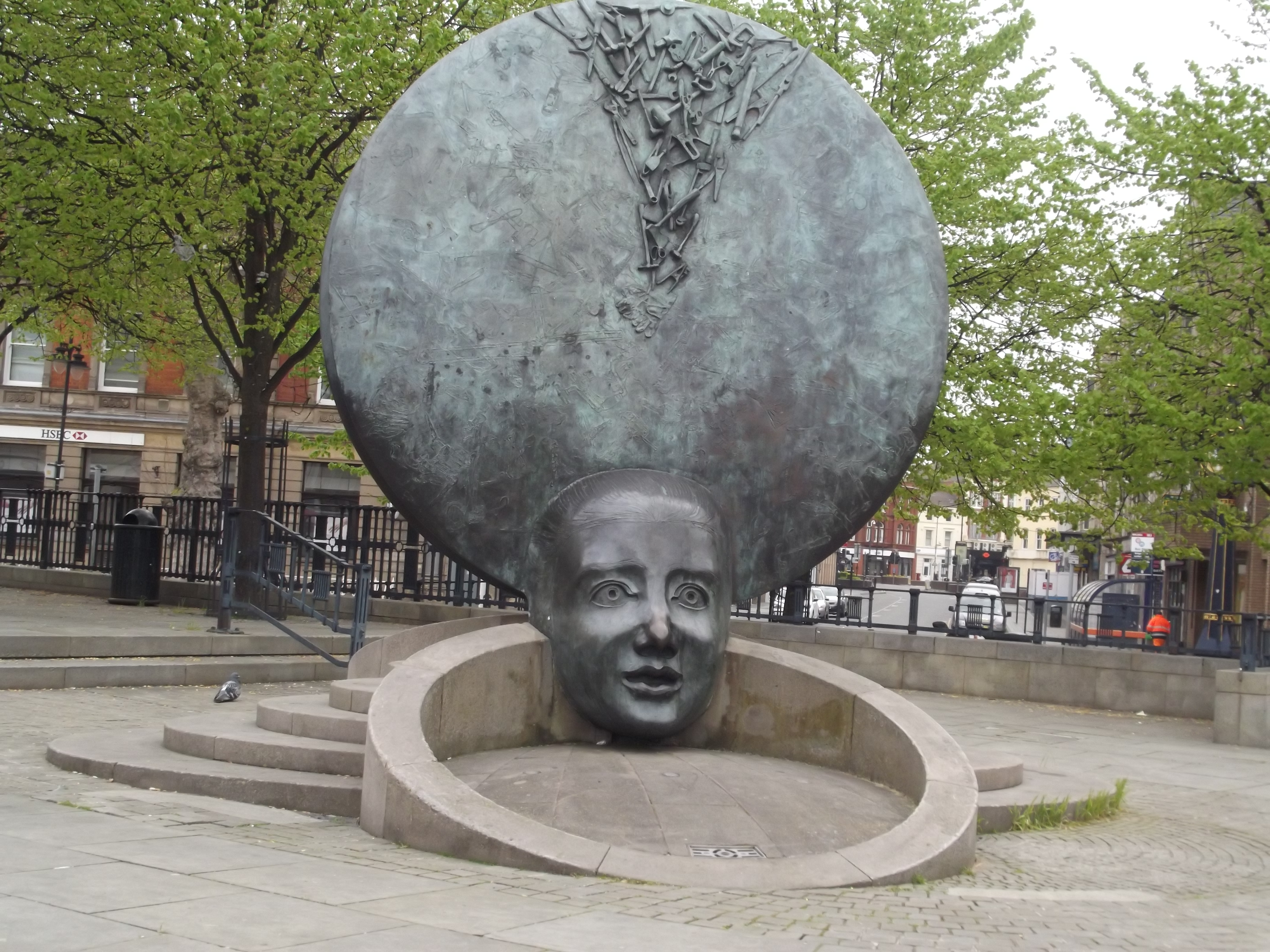
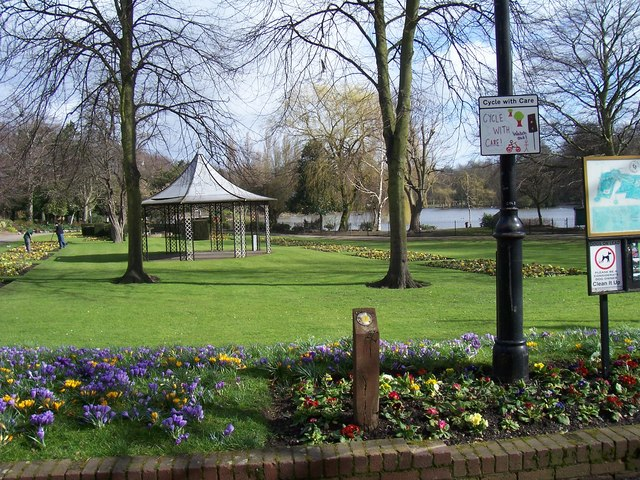
- Skyline High Street New Art Gallery Council House Market Square Arboretum

- Location within the West Midlands
- Population: 70,778 (2021 Census BUA Profile)
- OS grid reference: SP0198
  - London: 124 mi (200 km)
- Civil parish: Unparished
- Metropolitan borough: Walsall
- Metropolitan county: West Midlands
- Region: West Midlands
- Country: England
- Sovereign state: United Kingdom
- Areas of the town: List: Alumwell; Beechdale; Bescot; Birchills; Caldmore; Chuckery; New Mills; Paddock; Pleck; Rushall; The Delves
- Post town: WALSALL
- Postcode district: WS1–WS4, WS5 (part), WS9 (part), WS10 (part)
- Dialling code: 01922
- Police: West Midlands
- Fire: West Midlands
- Ambulance: West Midlands
- UK Parliament: Walsall and Bloxwich
- Website: https://go.walsall.gov.uk/

Walsall (/ˈwɔːlsɔːl, ˈwɒlsɔːl/, locally /ˈwɔːsʊl/) is a market town and administrative centre of the Metropolitan Borough of Walsall, part of the Black Country in the West Midlands, England. Historically part of Staffordshire, it is located 9 miles (14 km) north-west of Birmingham, 7 miles (11 km) east of Wolverhampton and 9 miles (14 km) south-west of Lichfield.

Walsall was transferred from Staffordshire to the newly created West Midlands county in 1974. At the 2011 census, the town's built-up area had a population of 67,594, with the wider borough having a population of 269,323.

== History ==
=== Early settlement ===
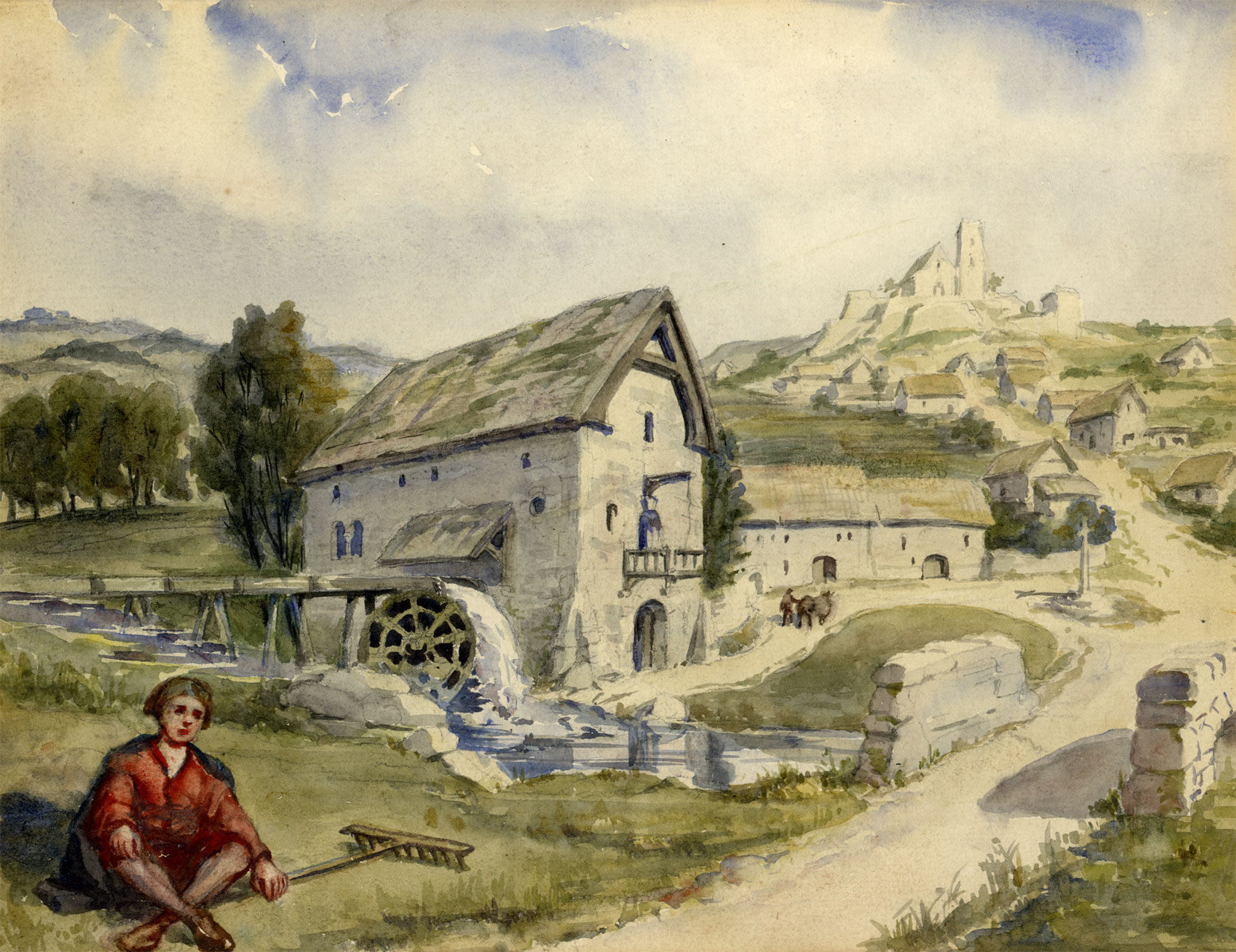
Walsall in Medieval Times, 15th Century; watercolour by Henry Somerfield, The New Art Gallery Walsall permanent collection, 1976.278.P

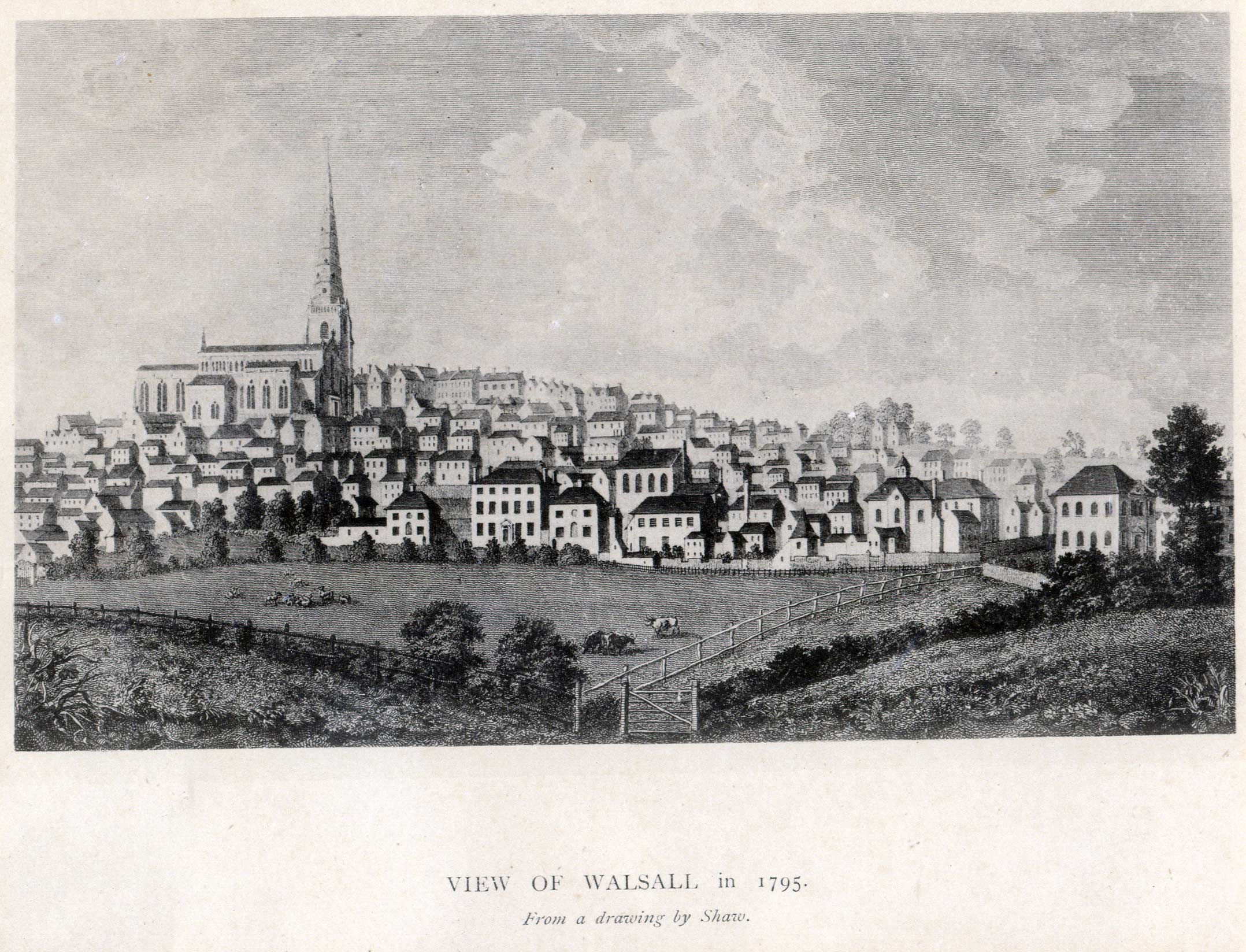
View of Walsall in 1795; engraving after Shaw, The New Art Gallery Walsall Permanent Collection 1976.102.P

The name Walsall is derived from "Walh halh", meaning "valley of the Welsh", referring to the Celtic Britons who first lived in the area. Later, it is believed that a manor was held here by William Fitz-Ansculf, who held numerous manors in the Midlands. By the first part of the 13th century, Walsall was a small market town with a manor house, Walsall Castle; the weekly market was introduced in 1220 and held on Tuesdays. The mayor of Walsall was created as a political position in the 14th century.

The Manor of Walsall was held by the Crown and given as a reward to royal proteges. In 1525, it was given to the King's illegitimate son, Henry Duke of Richmond, and in 1541 to the courtier Sir John Dudley, later Duke of Northumberland. It was seized by Queen Mary in 1553, after Northumberland had been found guilty of treason.

Queen Mary's Grammar School was founded in 1554 and the school carries the queen's personal badge as its emblem: the Tudor Rose and the sheaf of arrows of Mary's mother Catherine of Aragon tied with a Stafford knot.

The town was visited by Queen Elizabeth I, when it was known as 'Walshale'. It was also visited by Henrietta Maria in 1643. She stayed in the town for one night at a building named the 'White Hart' in the area of Caldmore.

The Manor of Walsall was later sold to the Wilbraham and Newport families, and passed by inheritance to the Earls of Bradford. On the death of the fourth Earl in 1762, the estate was transferred to his sister Diana, Countess of Mountrath and then reverted to the Earls of Bradford until the estates were sold after World War II. The family's connection with Walsall is reflected in local placenames, including Bridgeman Street, Bradford Lane, Bradford Street and Mountrath Street.

=== Industrial Revolution ===
The Industrial Revolution changed Walsall from a village of 2,000 people in the 16th century to a town of over 86,000 in approximately 200 years. The town manufactured a wide range of products including saddles, chains, buckles and plated ware. Nearby, limestone quarrying provided the town with much prosperity.

In 1824, the Walsall Corporation received an Act of Parliament to improve the town by providing lighting and a gasworks. The gasworks was built in 1826 at a cost of £4,000. In 1825, the corporation built eleven tiled, brick almshouses for poor women. They were known to the area as 'Molesley's Almshouses'.

The 'Walsall Improvement and Market Act' was passed in 1848 and amended in 1850. The Act provided facilities for the poor, improving and extending the sewerage system and giving the commissioners the powers to construct a new gas works. On 10 October 1847, a gas explosion killed one person and destroyed the west window of St Matthew's Church.

Walsall received a railway line in 1847, 48 years after canals reached the town, Bescot having been served since 1838 by the Grand Junction Railway. In 1855, Walsall's first newspaper, the Walsall Courier and South Staffordshire Gazette, was published.

The Whittimere Street drill hall was completed in 1866. The Victorian Arcade in the town centre, originally named the Digbeth Arcade, was completed in 1897.

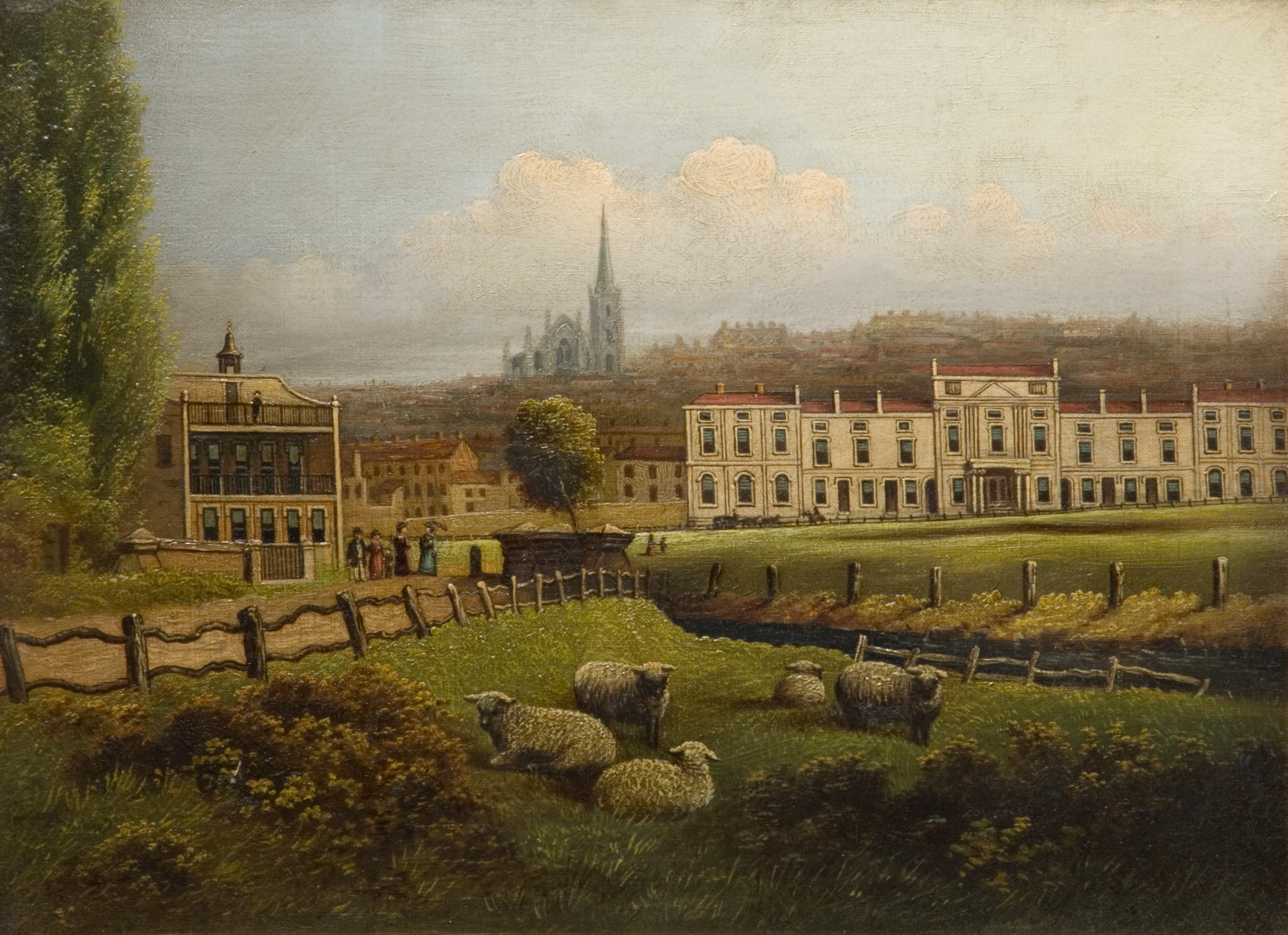
19th-century painting of the racecourse, Bradford Street, Walsall, now in the collection of The New Art Gallery Walsall

=== First World War ===
Over 2,000 men from Walsall were killed in fighting during the First World War. They are commemorated by the town's cenotaph, which is located on the site of a bomb which was dropped by Zeppelin 'L 21', killing the town's mayoress and two others. Damage from the Zeppelin can still be seen on what is now a club on the corner of the main road, just opposite a furniture shop. A plaque commemorates the incident. The town also has a memorial to local VC recipient, John Henry Carless and decorated air ace Frederick Gibbs.

=== 20th-century developments ===
Walsall's first cinema opened in the town centre in 1908; however, the post-World War II decline in cinema attendances brought on by the rise in television ownership resulted in that and all of Walsall's other cinemas eventually being closed. The first Wurlitzer theatre organ in Great Britain was installed in the New Picture House cinema in Lower Bridge Street in the town centre. It was later renamed the Gaumont then Odeon.

Slum clearance began after the end of World War I, with thousands of 19th century buildings around the town centre being demolished as the 20th century wore on; new estates were built away from the town centre during the 1920s and 1930s. These were concentrated in areas to the north of the town centre such as Coal Pool, Blakenall Heath (where Walsall's first council houses were built in 1920), Goscote and Harden. after the end of World War II, Beechdale.

Significant developments also took place nearer to the town centre, particularly during the 1960s when a host of tower blocks were built around the town centre; however, most of these had been demolished by 2010.

The Memorial Gardens opened in 1952, in honour of the town's fallen combatants of the two world wars. The Old Square Shopping Centre, a modern indoor shopping complex featuring many big retail names, opened in 1969.

Much of the reconstruction of the post-war period was quickly reconsidered as ugly and having blighted the town. In 1959, John Betjeman advised that with sensitive restoration the old buildings of the High Street could become "one of the most attractive streets in England." Instead, almost every building was demolished.

The County Borough of Walsall, which was established at Walsall Council House and originally consisted of Walsall and Bloxwich, was expanded in 1966 to incorporate most of Darlaston and Willenhall, as well as small parts of Bilston and Wednesbury. The current Metropolitan Borough of Walsall was formed in 1974 when Aldridge-Brownhills Urban District was incorporated into Walsall. At the same time, Walsall was transferred from the historic county of Staffordshire to become part of the new West Midlands county.

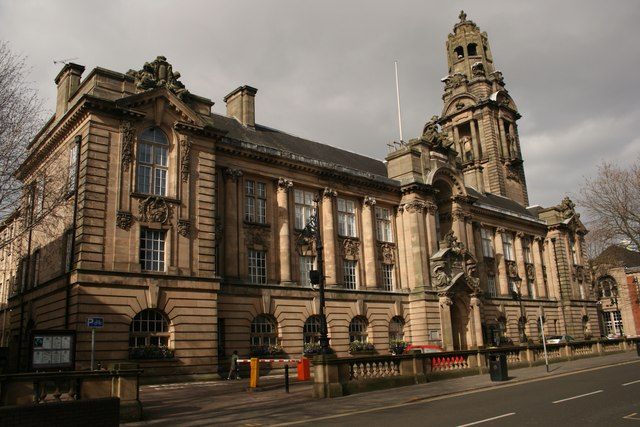
Walsall Council House, completed in 1905

The Saddlers Centre, a modern shopping mall opened in 1980, was refurbished within a decade. On 23 November 1981, an F1/T2 tornado touched down in Bloxwich and later moved over parts of Walsall town centre and surrounding suburbs, causing some damage. The Jerome K. Jerome museum, dedicated to the locally born author (1859–1927), was opened in 1984.

The town's prolific leather industry was recognised in 1988 when the Princess Royal opened Walsall Leather Museum.

By the 1990s, a canalside area in the town centre known as Town Wharf was being developed for leisure, shopping and arts facilities.

=== 21st century ===
The town's new art gallery opened at Town Wharf in early 2000. The following year, Crown Wharf retail park opened nearby, accommodating retailers including Next and TK Maxx which closed on 9 September 2020.

The 21st century has also seen a number of housing regeneration projects in the most deprived areas. Many of the town's 1960s tower blocks have been demolished, as well as interwar council housing in parts of Blakenall Heath and Harden, along with all of the Goscote estate. New private and social housing has been built on the site of most of the demolished properties.

=== Redevelopment and local government reorganisation ===
Walsall underwent modernisation in the 1970s with a new town centre being built at the expense of some medieval properties. In 1974, Walsall was transferred from the county of Staffordshire to form the metropolitan county of the West Midlands.

The Saddlers Centre, a modern shopping complex, was opened in the town centre in 1980. This included a new Marks & Spencer department store.

Early 2000 saw the opening of The New Art Gallery Walsall in the north-west of the town centre, near Wolverhampton Street, along with the new Crown Wharf Retail Park shortly afterwards. Part of Park Street, the town's main shopping area, was redeveloped around the same time. The centrepiece of this redevelopment was the new British Home Stores department store, which relocated from St Paul's Street at the end of the 1990s.

The Savoy Cinema was a landmark on Park Street for more than half a century after its opening on 3 October 1938. It was refurbished in 1973 and became the Cannon Cinema after a takeover in 1986, but closed on 18 November 1993 after operating as a cinema for 55 years. It was demolished some 18 months later.

== Geography ==
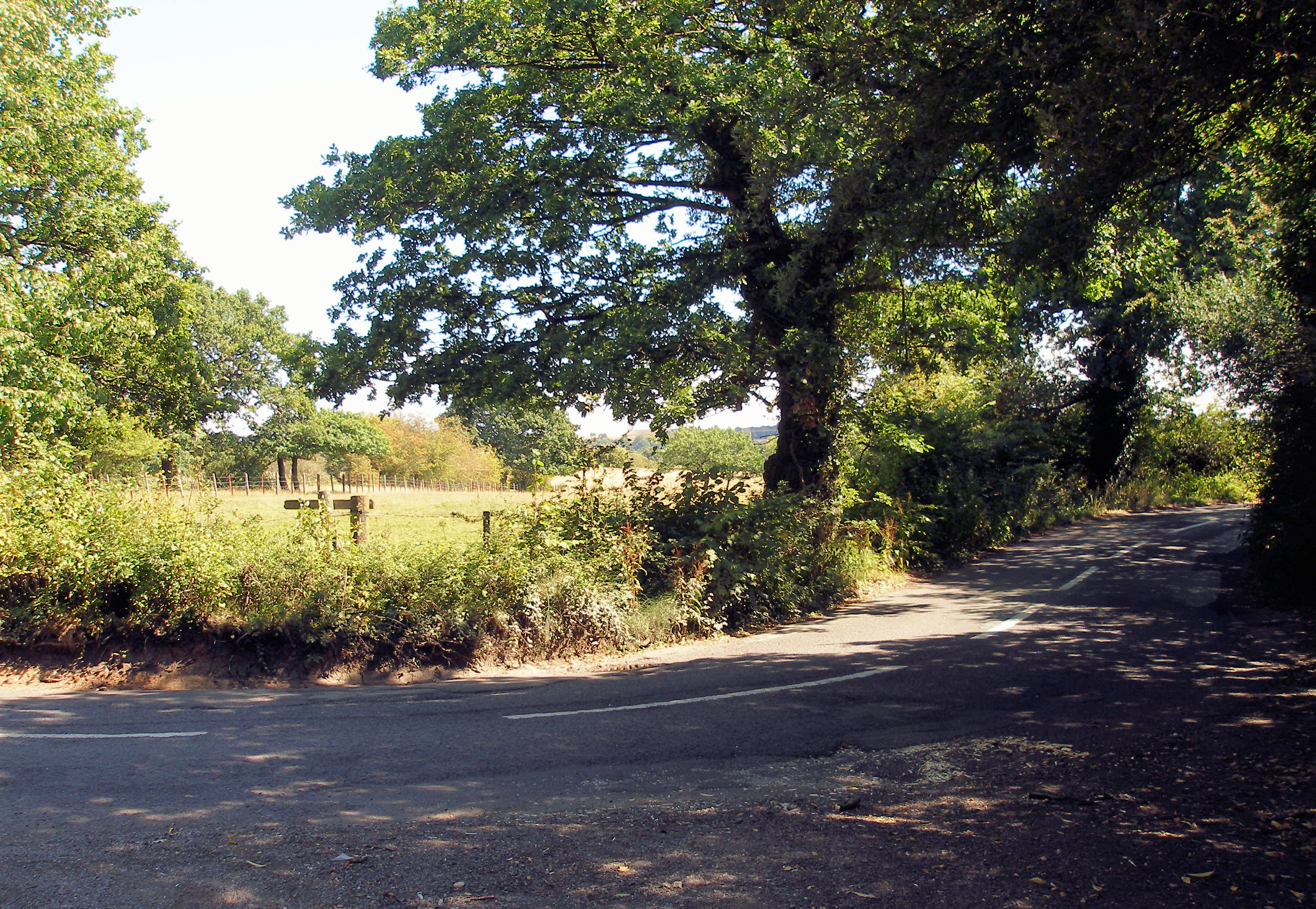
Skip Lane looking east; parts of Walsall are semi-rural. Barr Beacon is on the horizon.

A local landmark is Barr Beacon, which is reportedly the highest point following its latitude eastwards until the Ural Mountains in Russia. The soil of Walsall consists mainly of clay with areas of limestone, which were quarried during the Industrial Revolution.

=== Suburbs and areas ===
- Alumwell
- Beechdale
- Bentley
- Bescot
- Birchills
- Blakenall Heath
- Butts
- Caldmore
- Chuckery
- Coalpool
- The Delves
- Fullbrook
- Forest Estate
- Goscote
- Great Barr
- Harden
- Highgate
- Leamore
- North Walsall
- Palfrey
- Park Hall
- Pheasey
- Pleck
- Reedswood
- Rushall
- Ryecroft
- Shelfield
- Tamebridge

=== Climate ===
Climate data for Walsall, UK (2018-present)
Month	Jan	Feb	Mar	Apr	May	Jun	Jul	Aug	Sep	Oct	Nov	Dec	Year
Mean daily maximum °C (°F)	5.6 (42.1)	6.1 (43.0)	8.3 (46.9)	12.2 (54.0)	15 (59)	18.9 (66.0)	20 (68)	20 (68)	17.2 (63.0)	12.8 (55.0)	8.3 (46.9)	6.7 (44.1)	12.6 (54.7)
Mean daily minimum °C (°F)	1.7 (35.1)	1.7 (35.1)	2.2 (36.0)	4.4 (39.9)	6.7 (44.1)	10.6 (51.1)	12.2 (54.0)	12.2 (54.0)	10.6 (51.1)	7.2 (45.0)	4.4 (39.9)	2.8 (37.0)	6.4 (43.5)
Source: Near Rough Wood Station

== Demography ==
At the 2021 census, Walsall's built-up area population was recorded as having a population of 70,778. Of the findings, the ethnicity and religious composition of the wards separately were:

Walsall: Ethnicity: 2021 Census
Ethnic group	Population	%
Asian or Asian British	33,269	47%
White	26,950	38.1%
Black or Black British	4,906	6.9%
Other Ethnic Group	2,829	4%
Mixed	2,495	3.5%
Arab	314	0.4%
Total	70,778	100%

The religious composition of the built-up area at the 2021 Census was recorded as:

Walsall: Religion: 2021 Census
Religious	Population	%
Muslim	24,540	36.6%
Christian	20,880	31.2%
Irreligious	11,142	16.6%
Sikh	7,014	10.5%
Hindu	2,832	4.2%
Other religion	466	0.7%
Buddhist	133	0.2%
Jewish	13	0.1%
Total	70,778	100%

The tables show that Walsall's surrounding suburbs have the largest Asian and Muslim populations of any town in West Midlands County. White British and Christians remain the second-largest population of the town and other religions/ethnic minorities form the remainder of the population of the town.

The Walsall dialect and accent is referred to as "Yam-Yam" spoken by those from The Black Country.

== Economy ==
Walsall has had many industries, from coal mining to metal working. In the late 19th century, the coal mines ran dry, and Walsall became internationally famous for its leather trade. Walsall manufactured Queen Elizabeth II handbags, saddles for the royal family and leather goods for King Charles III as Prince of Wales. Walsall is the traditional home of the English saddle manufacturing industry, hence the nickname of Walsall Football Club, "the Saddlers". Apart from leather goods, other industries in Walsall include iron and brass founding, limestone quarrying, small hardware, plastics, electronics, chemicals and aircraft parts.

Walsall's location in Central England and the fact that the M6 runs through the Metropolitan Borough of Walsall has increased its investment appeal. The main RAC control centre is located in Walsall close by J9 of the M6 and there are now plans to redevelop derelict land in nearby Darlaston and turn it into a state-of-the-art regional centre. Between Bloxwich and Walsall there is a business corridor where TK Maxx has recently opened a regional depot. Currently established businesses include Homeserve plc and South Staffordshire Water.

The three largest businesses by turnover in the borough are all involved with the storage and distribution of retail goods to an associated network of high street or cornershop stores. Poundland Ltd (owned by Gordon Brothers), A F Blakemore and Sons Ltd and One Stop Stores Ltd (part of Tesco plc) turn over more than £4.5bn annually between them.

== Education ==
Walsall is home to the University of Wolverhampton's Sports and Art Campus and School of Education, all part of the Walsall Campus in Gorway Road, which includes a student village. Walsall College provides further education, and is based around three sites across Walsall. There are ten secular junior schools and three religious junior schools near the town centre. Walsall also houses many secondary schools, including comprehensives, academies, private and state grammar schools (Namely Queen Mary's Grammar School and Queen Mary's High School).

The age of transfer to secondary school throughout the borough is 11 years, although the Aldridge-Brownhills area of the borough had a system of 5–9 first, 9–13 middle and 13–18 secondary schools until 1986, as the former urban district council of this area had adopted the three-tier system in 1972.

Schools within the borough are administered by Walsall MBC.SERCO.

== Religion ==
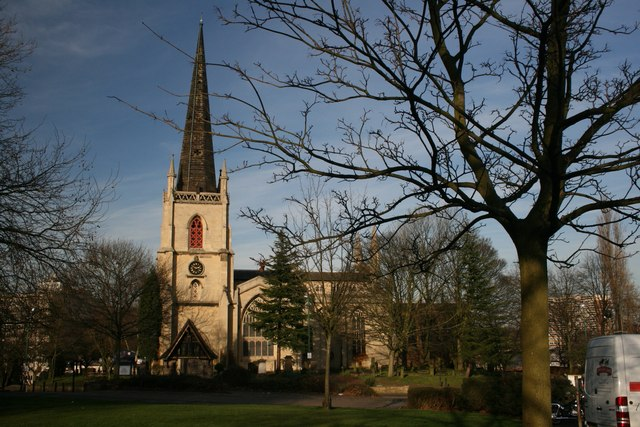
St Matthew's Church, Walsall

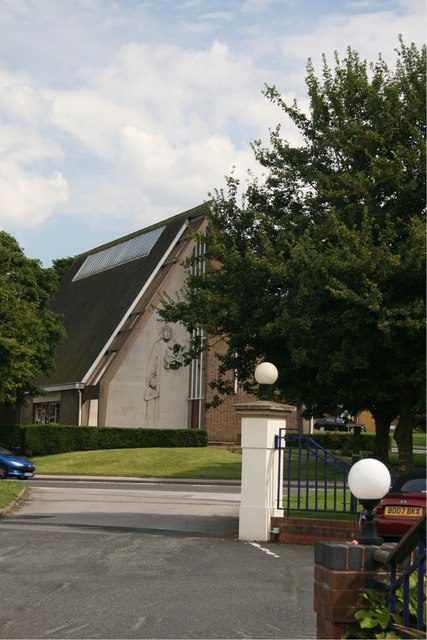
St Martin's Church

Christianity is the largest religion in the Walsall Borough, shown in the 2011 census as 59.0%. The second largest is Islam recorded at 8.2%.

Of the churches in Walsall, St Matthew's Church lies to the north of the town centre near the Asda supermarket, and can be seen when entering Walsall in any direction where it is the highest structure. In 1821, St Matthew's Church was demolished with exception of the tower and chancel and replaced at a cost of £20,000 to a design by Francis Goodwin. St Martin's Church was consecrated in 1960 to serve the suburban housing estates of Orchard Hills, Brookhouse and Park Hall. Mellish Road Methodist Chapel, built 1910, had to be demolished in 2011, due to subsidence. Other churches in Walsall include: The Crossing at St Paul's, in the town centre, and the Rock Church, near the Walsall Arboretum, Walsall Community Church, which meets at the Goldmine Centre. The Catholic St Mary's Church was built in 1827, designed by Joseph Ireland and is a Grade II* listed building.

There are also numerous mosques or Masjids in Walsall. Most of these are in close proximity to each other, located in the adjoining areas of Caldmore and Palfrey, just south of the town centre. In the ward of Palfrey is Walsall's most-attended mosque, Masjid-Al-Farouq, alongside Aisha Mosque. Caldmore is home to five mosques: Masjid-e-Usman, Shah Jalal Masjid, Jalalia Masjid, and Ghausia Qasmia Mosque and the Baitul Muqeet Mosque which was inaugurated in 2018.

In Chuckery, in the southeast of Walsall, lies Anjuman-e-Gosia Mosque, and Jamia Masjid Ghausia is located in the Birchills neighbourhood. There is also a private Islamic school and Madrassah with four campuses across Walsall known as Abu Bakr Trust.

== Transport ==
=== Buses ===
Local bus routes are operated predominantly by West Midlands Bus and Diamond West Midlands, but also by smaller operators Walsall Community Transport, Carolean and Chaserider (formerly Arriva).

Walsall bus station is made up of two constituents:

- St Paul's routes serve Birmingham; Wolverhampton and Willenhall; north to Bloxwich, Cannock and Brownhills; and east to Sutton Coldfield and Aldridge. In addition, services link to areas of Staffordshire such as Burntwood, Lichfield and Little Aston.
- Bradford Place facilitates routes to the south and south-west: to West Bromwich, Bilston, Willenhall, Darlaston, Oldbury, Dudley and Merry Hill Centre. There are also numerous shorter bus routes leaving from both stations which give the town centre a link to housing estates including Alumwell, Beechdale, Chuckery, Gility Village, Park Hall and the Walsall Manor Hospital.

=== Roads ===
Walsall is extremely well connected within the UK road network, as it is served by the M6 motorway which connects the M1 motorway in Leicestershire and the M74 motorway north of Carlisle. There are three nearby junctions which serve Walsall on the M6: J7, J9 and J10. The stretch between these junctions is one of the busiest in Europe.

The town is also served by the A34 which connects Salford, Manchester, the M42 motorway towards London and Winchester. It is connected regionally by the A454 Black Country route. In 2018, the UK Department for Transport estimated that 953 million miles were driven on Walsall's roads.

=== Railway ===
Walsall railway station is situated on Station Street in the town centre and is also accessible from the Saddlers shopping centre.

West Midlands Railway operates the following weekday off-peak service:

- Two trains per hour in each direction between Birmingham International and Rugeley Trent Valley
- Two trains per hour between Walsall and Wolverhampton.

There is also a suburban station at Bescot Stadium, at which the Walsall-Wolverhampton service also calls.

=== Trams ===
A tram service began in the town towards the end of the 19th century and ran until 2 October 1933.

The West Midlands Metro now runs from Wolverhampton to Birmingham city centre. Soon, the metro will operate a tram extension from north of the former Wednesbury Town railway station across Potter Lane to a stop at Brierley Hill; this will see the metro line use the corridor from Wednesbury Town to Dudley, before running street level and back onto the track at Canal Street, then branching off to Merry Hill and a tram stop at Brierley Hill.

The corridor section from Walsall to Wednesbury Town has been preserved for freight traffic to use to Round Oak Steel Terminal in the near future. It is possible that the metro extension will look to run an extension to Walsall via Bescot, but will utilise the line with either people carriers or tram-trains.

Walsall was also to be part of the former 5 Ws scheme which would have connected it to Wolverhampton, Wednesfield, Willenhall and Wednesbury. Walsall Council decided to pull Walsall and Willenhall out of the scheme in favour of reopening the line to Wolverhampton to passengers via Darlaston and Willenhall. A proposal for the new stations to be built is part of a wider investment strategy to improve local services.

=== Air ===
Walsall Aerodrome operated from the 1930s until 1956. The nearest airport to Walsall is Birmingham Airport, which is located within 30 minutes' drive.

== Culture ==
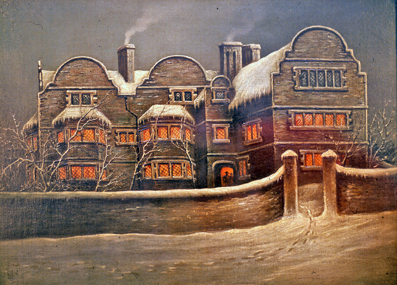
White Hart, Caldmore Oil painting by an unknown artist, The New Art Gallery Walsall permanent collection, 1976.088.P

=== Arboretum and illuminations ===
Walsall Arboretum was officially opened on 4 May 1874 by the wealthy Hatherton family. It was hoped that the park would provide "a healthy change from dogfights, bull-baiting and cockfights"; however, the 2d (old pence) admission was not popular with the public and within seven years the council took over ownership to provide free admission. Among the attractions available were two boating lakes on the sites of former quarries, tennis courts, an outdoor swimming pool and later – in the extension – a children's play area and paddling pool.

Over the years the Arboretum has seen many events and changes, including the beginnings of the Walsall Arboretum Illuminations as an annual event in 1951. Originally white bulbs in trees for courting couples in the autumn in the 1960s and 1970s, the lights were purchased secondhand from Blackpool Illuminations. The Illuminations had up to sixty thousand bulbs and took year-round planning. Although the event had attracted an estimated 250,000 people in 1995, lack of growth beyond this figure has raised the prospect of major redevelopment as the light shows have been exactly the same for a number of years. In February 2009, Walsall council announced that the Illuminations would not take place in 2009, 2010 and 2011. In January 2010, it was announced that the Illuminations had been permanently scrapped and would be replaced by other events such as concerts and laser shows throughout the year. The existing lights would be sold off, where possible, to interested parties.

=== Art gallery ===
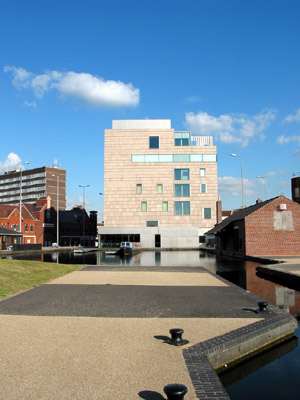
Walsall's new art gallery

The New Art Gallery Walsall opened in 2000. Named, as was its predecessor, the E M Flint Gallery in memory of Ethel Mary Flint, head of art at Queen Mary's Grammar School, an exhibitor at the Royal Academy, and a former mayor of Walsall, it contains a large number of works by Jacob Epstein as well as works by Van Gogh, Monet, Turner, Renoir and Constable. The large gallery space is host to temporary exhibitions. The lifts of the building use the voice of Noddy Holder to announce the arrival at various floors.

=== Museums ===
Walsall had two museums: Walsall Museum (closed 2015) and Walsall Leather Museum (still open). Walsall Museum featured local history objects primarily from the manufacturing trades and also had a space for temporary exhibitions, while the leather museum displays a mixture of leather goods and has recreations of leatherworkers workshops.

=== Public art ===
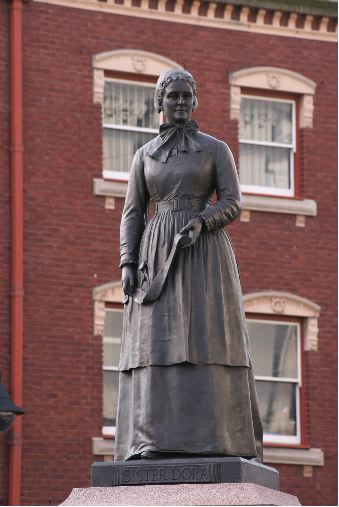
Statue of Sister Dora

The refurbished Sister Dora statue stands at the crossroads of Park Street and Bridge Street. Opposite this stood a locally famous concrete hippopotamus, which has since been moved to outside the library and replaced by a fountain. The hippo was designed by local architect and sculptor John Wood. There are three works in the town centre by the sculptor Tom Lomax: "Walsall Saddle" and "Nombelisk" in Bradford Street, and "Source of Ingenuity" in The Bridge.

=== Literature ===
Though the novelist and essayist Jerome K. Jerome was born in the town, he never wrote about it. Some writers have, including the Walsall born John Petty (1919–1973) who set a number of his books in Walsall, most famously Five Fags a Day (1956). More recently the comic novelist Paul McDonald has used Walsall as a location for Surviving Sting (2001) and Kiss Me Softly, Amy Turtle (2004).

=== Media ===
Local television news programmes are BBC Midlands Today and ITV News Central. Big Centre TV, the former local television channel covering Birmingham and the Black Country, was based in Walsall town centre for a short time.

Local radio stations are BBC Radio WM, Heart West Midlands, Smooth West Midlands, Capital Midlands, Hits Radio Birmingham, Greatest Hits Radio Birmingham & The West Midlands and Ambur Radio, a community based station which broadcast from the town.

The town is served by the local newspapers: Walsall Advertiser and Walsall Chronicle, which is owned by the Express & Star.

=== Commerce ===
In 1809, a market house was constructed at the end of High Street, on the site of the market cross, for the sale of poultry, eggs, butter and dairy produce. The building was demolished in 1852 along with other buildings that had fallen into disrepair. A pig market was constructed in the town in 1815 on High Street. At its peak, the market would handle the sale of 2,000 pigs per day.

In 1847, the corporation tried to construct a new market hall on the 'Bowling Green', to the rear of the Dragon Inn. The scheme proposed to use a large amount of public money to construct the hall. Shopkeepers feared that their businesses would be affected and demonstrations were held across the town against the proposals. The demonstrations forced the plans to be shelved.

== Recent changes ==
Projects due for completion in 2009 and 2010 include Walsall Manor Hospital redevelopment worth £174 million, the new Walsall College worth £65 million, the Waterfront South development worth £60 million and the St Matthew's Quarter worth more than £25 million. Other projects with approval include £500 million Walsall Gigaport which is a high-speed fibre optic internet environment for national and international businesses, Waterfront North development worth £65 million and the Waterfront Lex development.

Walsall Transport Package worth £17 million was also due for completion in 2009 but was actually completed earlier, allowing the early opening of a £55 million supermarket development to create scores of extra jobs. This is an overall development of roads in and out of Walsall town centre as well as those towards Walsall Arboretum.

== Sport ==
The town's football club, Walsall F.C. and known as the Saddlers, was founded in 1888 when Walsall Town F.C. and Walsall Swifts F.C. merged. They won their first game against Aston Villa. The club currently play in Football League Two.

There are also a number of non-league football clubs based within the borough, including Rushall Olympic.

Walsall Cricket Club won Birmingham League Premier Division in 2006.

Walsall RUFC is the town's rugby union team, which is currently competing in Midlands 1 West. There is also Handsworth RUFU, Aldridge RFC and Wednesbury RUFU.

Beacon Hockey Club (formerly Aldridge and Walsall Hockey Club) is a field hockey club that competes in the Midlands Hockey League.

Walsall was also once home to Formula 1 constructor Ensign Racing, in Walsall Wood from 1973 to 1980, before moving to Chasetown.

Walsall was home to a horse racing course. The grandstand was constructed in 1809 at a cost of £1,300 on a piece of land donated by the Earl of Bradford on a lease of 99 years. Soon after completion, one of the lower compartments was converted into a billiards room, which contained a table donated by Lord Chichester Spencer of Fisherwick Park. Throughout the 19th century, races were held annually at the racecourse at Michaelmas.

== Twin towns ==
Walsall is twinned with:

- Bahla, Oman (since 1953)
- Mulhouse, France (since 1962)
- Amritsar, India
- Kobar, West Bank, Palestine
