= Highgate, Walsall =

Village in West Midlands, England

Coordinates: 52.5769°N 1.9759°W

Highgate is a small village located within the Walsall Ring Road. The village was constructed in the Victorian era for the wealthy, and has developed a reputation as one of the most expensive neighbourhoods in Walsall for house prices.

== Geography ==
To the north is Walsall Town Centre and The Delves to the South with Caldmore to the west and Chuckery to the east.

== Places of interest ==
Located within Highgate is Highgate Brewery, the local brewery of Walsall, and Walsall Cricket Club, which is based on Gorway Road. The entrance to the University of Wolverhampton's Walsall Campus East Gate along with a car parking facility owned by the university is situated within Highgate.

== Highgate Brewery ==
Highgate Brewery was founded in 1898. It was purchased by Mitchells & Butlers in 1939, which merged with the Bass brewery in 1961. It became independent when the management bought it out in 1995; however it was purchased by Aston Manor Brewery in 2000 who used it to produce canned beer for supermarkets then sold it to pub company Global Star in July 2007. Following a tax bill of 1 million, Global sold it for £80,000 to two property developers.

== Highgate Windmill ==
Church Hill in Walsall is the highest and steepest section of a long ridge dropping gradually away towards the south, fading out before it reaches Broadway. Caldmore occupies the western flank of the ridge, and Highgate the crest and eastern side. Due to Highgate's position on the hill, it receives long views to the south and east, and is separated from central Walsall and the partly industrialised Caldmore area by the lie of the land. It is also the location of one of the Borough's most interesting buildings – Highgate Windmill. This windmill is unique in the Borough, being the only significant remains of this type of building. The top of Highgate Road was once known as Windmill Lane, and is situated about a mile from St. Matthew's Church, to the south. The old miller's cottage adjoins, its gable flanking Highgate Road. The mill tower is Grade II listed.

The remains of the mill, built around the beginning of the 19th century, tower strikingly above the surrounding houses. The sails no longer remain and the upper section has been modified and added to over the years. The tower has a slight taper until the later cylindrical portion is reached; it is roughly five storeys, approximately 50 feet (15 m), tall with a crenellated top, which was a later addition.

Mentioned in the Birmingham Gazette, Highgate Windmill came up for sale by Edward Rigby in both 1826 and 1828. It is known that Thomas Jennings worked it from 1835 to 1841, and in 1841, the Midland Counties Herald shows it being advertised by local builder M. Salt with a shop and cottage. Shortly thereafter, it was purchased by Mr. Moses Eyland, founder of the Walsall firm of buckle and spectacle makers Eyland & Sons, Ltd, of Lower Rushall Street (that factory having been converted into apartments in recent years). His son Charles Eyland, Mayor of Walsall 1857 – 58, inherited the property, having left his house in Lichfield Street for Hope Cottage, which stood in its own grounds adjoining the mill. During the Eyland ownership, the mill was worked by James Griffiths, who lived in the cottage opposite the malthouse, and it seems to have fallen into disuse between 1864 and 1868. After this, Charles Eyland removed the mill machinery, including the two grindstones. Appreciating the views that could be obtained from the top storey of the tower, Mr. Eyland rebuilt, raised and furnished the top room, fitting a fireplace and laying a carpet. To aid his viewing he arranged a mirror on the camera obscura principle, so that the four compass directions could be seen in one glass.

In 1890, Charles Eyland died, and the mill passed to Charles Newbold Eyland, who moved into Hope Cottage with his family. In around 1919, the tower was struck by lightning, knocking down a piece of the parapet. One evening, several men arrived claiming they had been asked to repair the roof. The men were allowed to work and stripped the roof of the lead and stole it. Deprived of its protective covering, the roof sprang a leak and the inside walls were marked, however the building remained stable. On the death of Charles Newbold Eyland in 1925, the mill was bought by George Skidmore of Sandwell Villa, Sandwell Street, a member of the firm of buckle makers of Windmill Street. At the time, Mr. Skidmore was famed for his record in playing cricket for more than sixty years. Mr. Skidmore, who had for many years been interested in astronomy, supervised the rebuilding of the tower, re-pointing the brickwork and raising the parapet by approximately 2 feet (1 m) and adding to the crenellations, so that it could be converted into an astronomical observatory. The floors were relaid with concrete on the oak beams, intending the construction to be more solid than before, and new stairs were built. George Skidmore then installed a large equatorial refracting telescope, which consisted of a lens, view finder, and a clockwork motor drive whereby it was possible to set the telescope on any star and ensure that it would be followed in its course across the heavens.

During World War II, Highgate Windmill's commanding position made it the natural choice for use as an observation post by local Air Raid Patrol wardens, and for years it was manned by them every night. By the 1960s, the mill had fallen into disrepair, becoming covered in ivy. Little has been done to the building since apart from the removal of some of the ivy. Today, Highgate Windmill remains privately owned, and closed to the public. Despite this, it can still be viewed from Highgate Road and the footpath between there and Folly House Lane.
