= Walsall Courier and South Staffordshire Gazette =

Walsall Courier and South Staffordshire Gazette is the earliest known newspaper to serve Walsall in the ancient county of Staffordshire, now the West Midlands.

Established in 1855, it was published by Newey & Foster of New Street. It was a weekly newspaper and only lasted one year before the Walsall Guardian and District Advertiser was established in 1856.
