= Park Hall =

Area in Walsall, West Midlands, United Kingdom

Coordinates: 52.5730°N 1.9449°W

Park Hall is an area near to the south-eastern edge of Walsall in the West Midlands of England. It is considered that the area near to the local Park Hall Primary and Infant schools and the Gillity Village shops are classed as Park Hall.

Park Hall estate is close to the other Walsall suburbs of Chuckery, Yew Tree, and The Delves. It is in the Walsall South parliamentary constituency; the local MP is Valerie Vaz of the Labour Party. The previous long-standing MP was Bruce George who retired just prior to the candidates being declared for the 2010 general election.

The Gillity Village shops are the central point of Park Hall, containing a mixture of food and other shops. Further shops can be found on the estate at the junction of Gillity Avenue and Edinburgh Road. There are four pubs in and near to the estate.

== Sir William Joseph Pearman-Smith of Park Hall ==
The area is named after Park Hall, built in 1863, which was the home of Sir William Pearman-Smith (b.1864) who was knighted by King Edward VIII on 19 February 1936. He died in 1939. A solicitor, he was a senior partner in the law firm Messrs Pearman-Smith and Sons, established by his grandfather. He was a governor of Stowe School. Pearman-Smith was Walsall's mayor from 1899 to 1902. Park Hall was demolished in the 1950s.

Park Hall primary school was opened on the site of the hall in 1970. It outgrew its original building, so a junior school, which was used as a community centre until 2013, known as Park Hall Community Centre, was built next door, opening in 1974. The community centre has since moved and is no longer located in Park Hall. No community activities take place at the school since it became an academy in 2012. It was the first purpose-built Junior Community School built in the UK. Park Hall infant and junior school are mixed and secular. The school took grant-maintained status in January 1994. The infant school teaches over 300 pupils with students' standards in national tests being in the highest five per cent of the country upon leaving. Park Hall Junior School has over 400 pupils and it is the 9th ranked junior school out of 80 in the Walsall region in the aggregate score across the three test subjects of English, Maths and Science.
