= Walsall Leather Museum =

Coordinates: 52.5886°N 1.9833°W

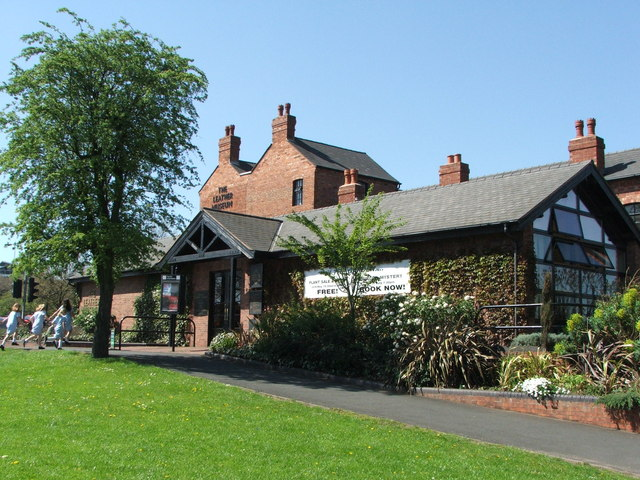
- Established: 1988
- Location: Walsall, West Midlands
- Type: Industrial Museum
- Website: Official website

Walsall Leather Museum is located in Walsall, in the West Midlands in England, and was opened in 1988, in a Victorian factory building renovated by Walsall Council. It tells the story of the leather trade in Walsall, charting the town's rise from a small market town into an international saddle-making centre.

== The Industry ==
In 1900, at the peak of the industry, approximately 10,000 people were employed locally in preparing leather, and making saddles, horse bridles and related leather items. It is estimated that there are still at least 40 manufacturers of saddles and bridles in the town including a number of makers of bags and light leathergoods, including Royal Warrant holders.

== Exhibitions ==
Exhibits in the museum include a range of Walsall-made leathergoods, from saddles to gloves, bags, shoes, and leather fashion accessories. A 'contemporary design' section in the museum showcases the work of designers working with leather today. Leather crafts traditional to Walsall are demonstrated within the museum's workshops by a team of experienced skilled craftsmen and women.

The museum also houses a research library of specialist works on the subject of the leather craft and industry. There is a seasonal events programme featuring craft workshops for children and adults as well as family events.

== See also ==
- Igualada Leather Museum
- German Leather Museum

== Bibliography ==
- Glasson, Michael (2003). The Walsall Leather Industry. Images of England. The History Press. ISBN 0-7524-2793-8.
- Marshall, Geoff (2008). Walsall: An Illustrated History. The History Press Ltd. ISBN 978-0-7524-4656-1.
- Mills, David (1995) [1993]. In the Leather (2 vols.). Tempus. ISBN 1-873612-50-8.
