= Alumwell =

Community in England

Coordinates: 52.5835°N 2.0014°W

Alumwell is a suburb on the west side of Walsall, in the West Midlands of England. The area is home to Walsall Manor Hospital, and is part of the Pleck Ward on the local council. The neighbourhood is adjacent to the M6 and can be seen from the motorway by passing drivers. The neighbourhood is by a primary and secondary school. Most of the houses on the estate were built by the local authority during the 1950s.

In 2013, a national suburb census was taken in order to show faults and concerns In Alumwell so that areas could be developed. The census shown that 57% of residents were British, 41% were Asian and 2% other. The census shown areas of development such as crime, unemployment rate and street cleanliness. Crime was rated as 'Likely' in all three zones of Alumwell with Zone 2 resulting in the highest crime rate of the area. A ratio of 6:4 was shown that 60% of residents do not work and claim state benefits. This could also be to the high number of retired and young people on the area. And Street Cleanliness was rated as 'Poor' with comments such as concerns with graffiti, loitering and broken bus stop windows. Primley Avenue Park also went under inspection for drug use in 2013 which shown that drug use was clear to familiar to be taken place. This was reported.

In 2014, Alumwell underwent inspection again and was rated third most deprived area in Walsall and 350th nationally.

Alumwell has a high quality of community workers such as neighbourhood watch which is shown effective in all three areas of Alumwell. The area is due to undergo a scheme in which roads will be redone, clearing of rubbish and the cleaning of graffiti.

Alumwell is home to four schools which run operational sporting activities for residents out of school time. Alumwell used to have three youth clubs located on Wolverhampton Road, Old Pleck Road and a Mobile youth club. All three were scrapped due to a lack of usage.

In 2011 it was estimated that the average number of children per household was three. Which improved from 2006 where the average number of children per household was five.
