= Ryecroft, West Midlands =

Settlement in Walsall, England

Coordinates: 52.601°N 1.978°W

Ryecroft is a residential area of Walsall in the West Midlands of England. It is situated to the north of the town centre and is centred on the main A34 road in the direction of Stafford.

The housing in Ryecroft is predominantly turn-of-the-20th century private terraces and interwar council semi-detached houses. The suburb includes a cemetery and a community hub.
