= Walsall Aerodrome =

Former airport in the West Midlands of England

- IATA: none; ICAO: none

Summary
- Airport type: Public
- Owner/Operator: Walsall Council
- Serves: Walsall
- Location: Aldridge, Staffordshire. England
- Opened: 1930s
- Closed: 1956
- Coordinates: 52°35′28″N 001°56′06″W

Map

Walsall Aerodrome, also known as Walsall Airport, Walsall Municipal Airport, and later as Walsall Aldridge Airport was an airport at Aldridge, Staffordshire, England, serving the town of Walsall, north Birmingham, Sutton Coldfield and Lichfield (Aldridge is now part of Walsall, and in the West Midlands county). It operated from the 1930s–1956.

== History ==
Walsall Council purchased Aldridge Lodge and 220 acres (89 ha) of its estate in 1930. Work on the airport began in 1932 and in 1937 the council contracted Walker Brothers Ltd of Victoria Ironworks, Walsall, to erect a hangar. A licence to operate was obtained in 1938.

In 1938 Amy Johnson gave a glider display to a crowd of around 6,000. On her final approach, her glider's wingtip touched a hedge and the aircraft turned over. She was taken to hospital, but was not seriously injured.

Operations were limited by the airfield's size, slope, and wet clay soil, making it unsuitable for larger aircraft. It closed in 1956 and most of the buildings were later demolished.

The land is now a public open space, known as Aldridge Airport, and hosts a variety of leisure activities under the auspices of Walsall Metropolitan Borough Council. However, it is still used for occasional helicopter landings, including training exercises by the West Midlands Police helicopter.

Currently it is also used by local dog walkers, Children's football league and all forms of model aircraft flying and of an evening it is known as a local dogging site this has been on going since the mid 1940s, continuing the tradition of an airfield.

== Helliwells ==
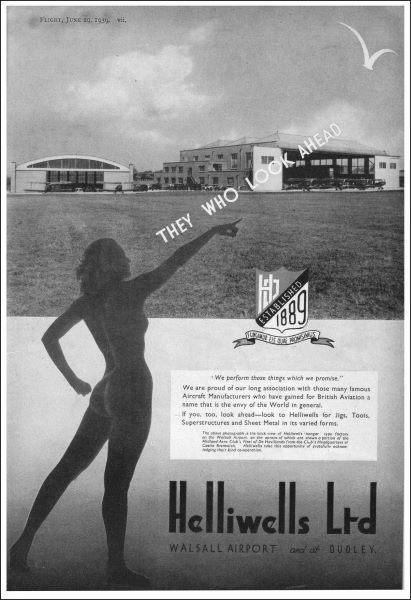
1939 Helliwells advert showing Walsall Airport

The engineering company Helliwells Ltd. had a base at the airfield c. 1939 – c. 1955. They made aircraft components and carried out modifications and repairs to aeroplanes.

== Archives ==
Walsall Archives and Local History Centre holds a number of research files containing documents relating to the airport.
