= Fullbrook =

Fullbrook is a surname. Notable people with the surname include:

- Lorraine Fullbrook (born 1959), British politician
- Mark Fullbrook (born 1962), British political strategist, lobbyist and Downing Street Chief of Staff
- Sam Fullbrook (1922–2004), Australian artist
- Charles Fullbrook-Leggatt (né Fullbrook), British soldier who served in both world wars

== See also ==
- Fullbrook School, school in Surrey, England
- Fulbrook (disambiguation)
