= Chuckery =

- District
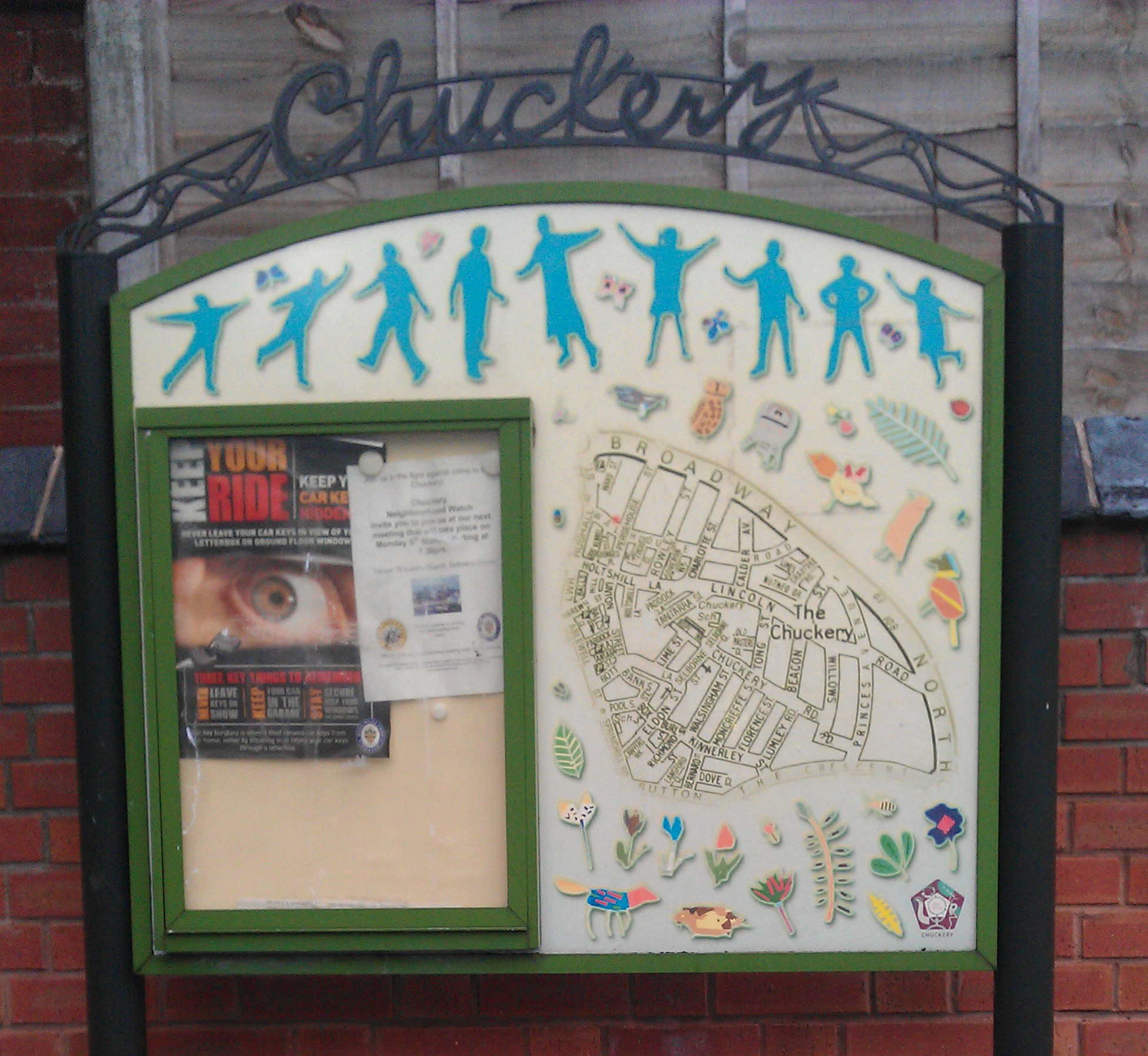
- Community noticeboard in Chuckery
- Interactive map of Chuckery
- Coordinates: 52.5838°N 1.9661°W
- Country: England
- County: West Midlands
- Town: Walsall

Chuckery is a small suburb of Walsall located a mile from the town centre.

== Name ==
The name "Chuckery" is believed to originate from the common medieval word to describe a poultry farming area.

== Demographics ==
Chuckery has a diverse ethnic mix, with a large South Asian community; particularly first and second generation Pakistani immigrants. Comprising relatively inexpensive housing (predominantly Victorian and Edwardian terraces and five Tower Blocks), it is primarily a working class area.

Since the Enlargement of the European Union in 2004, a growing number of Eastern Europeans, particularly from Swidnica, Poland, have settled in the area, mostly attracted to the manual and semi-skilled jobs in local light industry.

== Employment ==
Historically, the area was home to a large number of saddlers, with a number of the Victorian houses still having small workshops at the rear.

One of the largest employers in Chuckery is the Chamberlin and Hill iron foundry. In recent years residents have complained about the emissions from the foundry's chimney, claiming that it is an irritant, and causes staining to paintwork on houses and cars. Walsall Metropolitan Borough Council, working with Walsall Primary Care Trust are undertaking a detailed survey of air quality in the area, combining analysis of the air quality with surveys of local residents.

== Places of interest ==
It is the home of Chuckery Primary School, a number of Christian Churches and a Mosque. It is near to the established Mayfield Preparatory School and Hydesville Tower School. Queen Mary's Grammar School is also nearby.

The Chuckery Green is a small park located on Walsingham Street where locals commonly meet, play sports such as football and where children may access the play area.

As well as corner shops, the three main Public Houses are the Spring Cottage and the Duke of York, (both built in the late 1930s) and the older Walsall Arms. There were two working men's clubs, known locally as "The Big Club" and "The Little Club". Only "The Little Club" currently survives.

It is near to one of the main roads in Walsall, the Broadway, and is on the other side of the Broadway to a Victorian park, Walsall Arboretum.

Walsall F.C. played at the Chuckery ground from their foundation in 1888 until 1893. The site is now covered in housing.

== Transport ==
Bus route 74 - operated by Diamond Bus - provides a direct link from the suburb into the town centre, and also to the nearby Gillity Village. Bus route 22 - operated by Walsall Community Transport - provides a direct link from the suburb to Walsall town centre via The Butts and Mellish Road.

== Notable people ==
Bob Warman (born 1946-), TV presenter, born here.
