= St Matthew's Church, Walsall =

Anglican church in Walsall, West Midlands, England

St Matthew's Church
- St Matthew's Church, Walsall
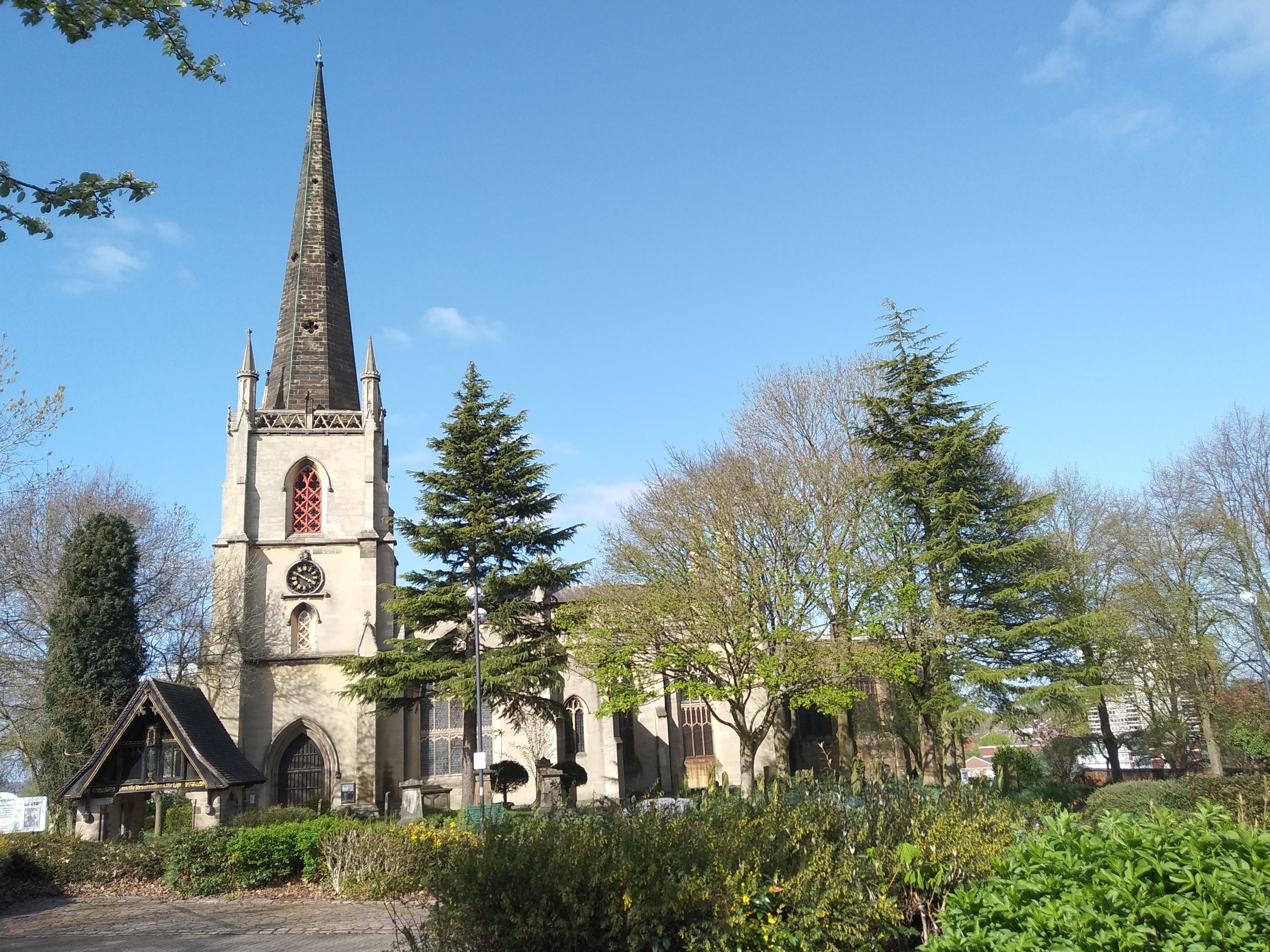
- St Matthew's Church, Walsall
- St Matthew's Church
- 52.5825°N 1.9772°W
- OS grid reference: SP 01639 98293
- Location: Walsall
- Country: England
- Denomination: Anglican
- Website: www.stmatthewswalsall.co.uk

History
- Status: Parish church

Architecture
- Functional status: Active
- Heritage designation: Grade II*
- Architect: Francis Goodwin

Administration
- Province: Canterbury
- Diocese: Lichfield
- Archdeaconry: Walsall
- Parish: Walsall

St Matthew's Church (formerly All Saints' Church) is a Church of England parish church in Walsall, West Midlands, England. It was rebuilt in 1820-1821 by Francis Goodwin, but includes remains of the earlier church built around 1220 and dedicated to All Saints. The church was rededicated to St Matthew when rebuilt. It is a Grade II* listed building, and is on Historic England's Heritage at Risk Register. The church remains active.

The first Rector, Serlo De Sunning, was appointed by King John in 1211. From 1248 until 1538 appointments of Rector were given to Halesowen Abbey. Since then, appointments were made by the Earl of Bradford and transferred to the Bishop of Lichfield in 1945.

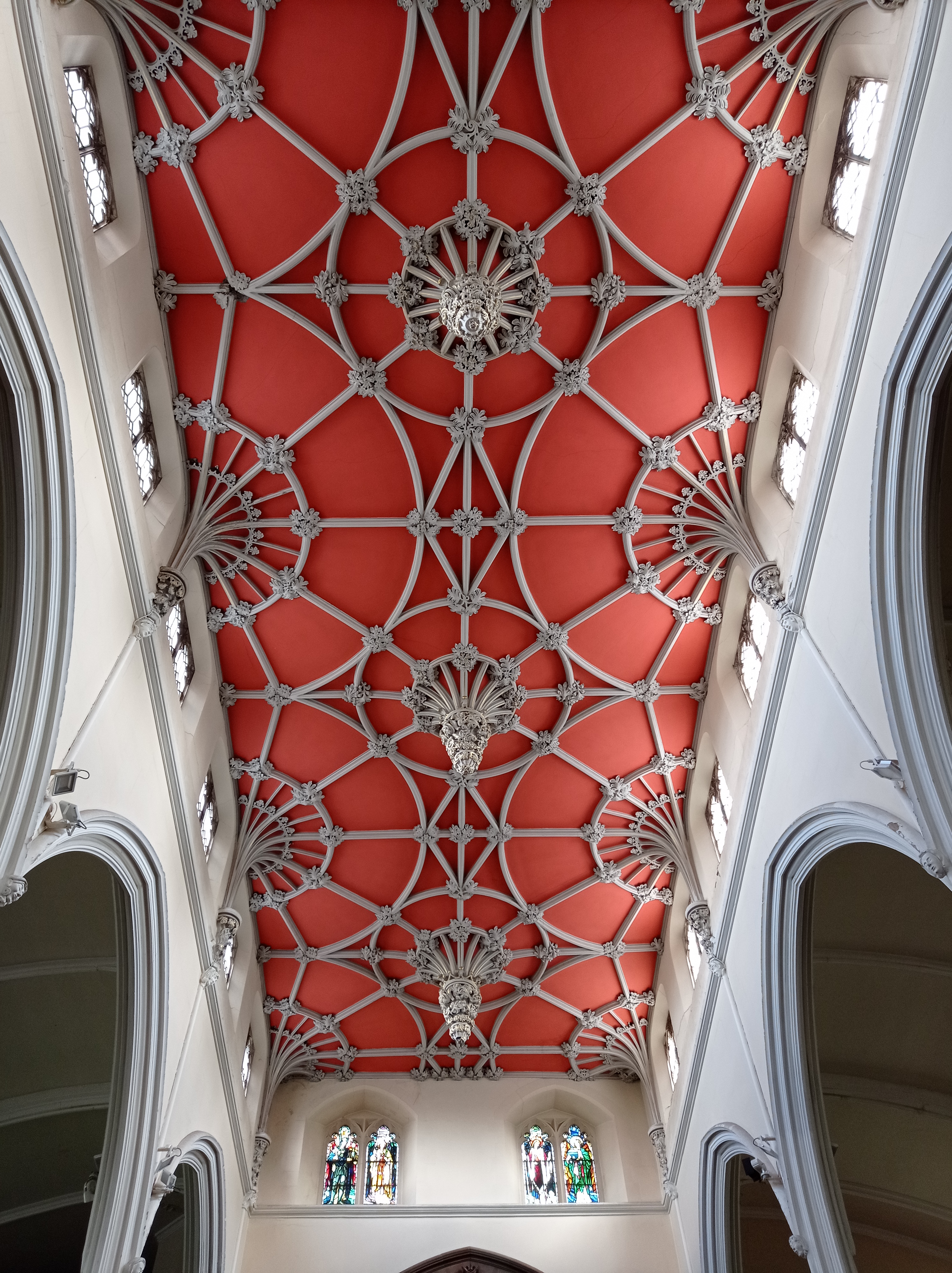
The nave ceiling

The east window commemorates Sister Dora and the stained glass is the work of Burlison and Grylls.
