= Caldmore =

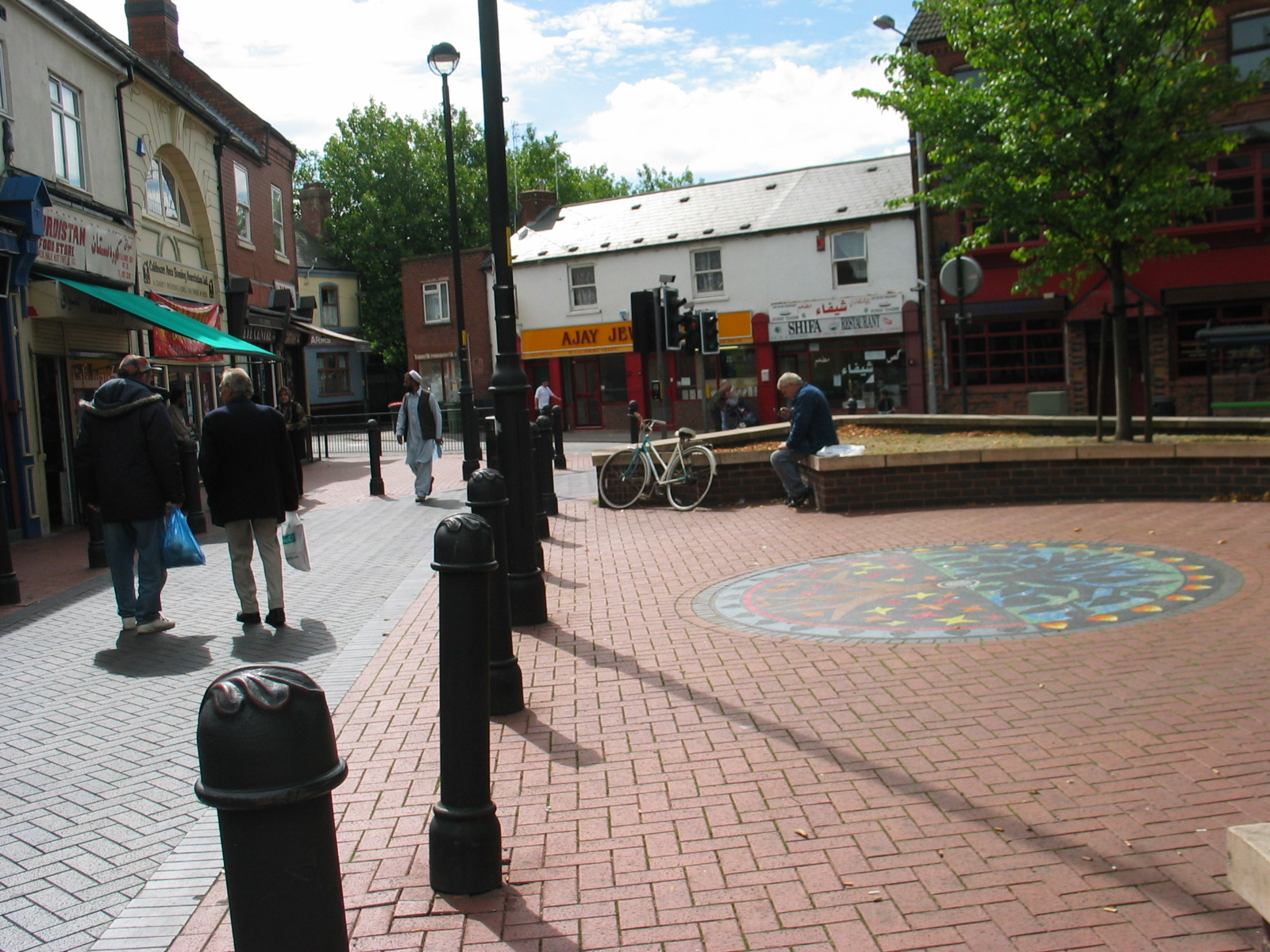
- Caldmore Green
- Interactive map of Caldmore
- Coordinates: 52.5767°N 1.9827°W
- Country: England
- County: West Midlands
- Borough: Metropolitan Borough of Walsall

Caldmore (/ˈkɑːmə/ KAH-mə) is a suburb of Walsall in the West Midlands, England. It is a historic village formerly in Staffordshire.

== History ==
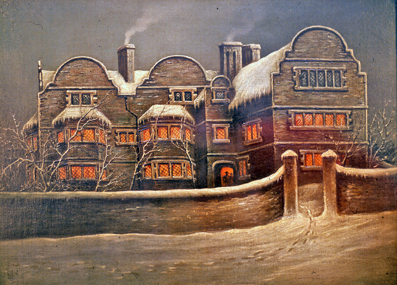
White Hart, Caldmore Oil painting by an unknown artist, The New Art Gallery Walsall permanent collection, 1976.088.P

The settlement of Caldmore grew up around an important road junction, the shape of which defined an open space of roughly triangular shape called Caldmore Green and, in the course of the 19th century, this became the principal focus for the development of a social and commercial area. Later, the area surrounding Caldmore Green underwent considerable redevelopment in the 1950s with the removal of Victorian slums and their replacement by new flats.

=== Caldmore House ===
Caldmore House is the surviving segment of Victorian terraced houses in Caldmore. Located on Carless Street (Oxford Street until 1923), it was part of a row of three houses which were built in 1886. The houses remained until the 1950s and 1960s when the street was bulldozed with only one house remaining. This was saved from demolition and modernised. It is now a museum open to the public with the original Victorian features still remaining in the house.

=== Noddy Holder ===
Noddy Holder, actor, guitarist and vocalist for Slade, was born in Caldmore.

=== Jerome K. Jerome ===
Jerome K. Jerome, late Victorian novelist, essayist, humourist and playwright, best known for his classic comic novel Three Men in a Boat, was born at Belsize House on the corner of Bradford Street and Caldmore Road.

=== Present ===
Caldmore Green is the centre of the Caldmore Shopping area with Caldmore Housing HQ base. The area is home to restaurants and fashion and jewellery outlets. In addition, Caldmore Housing annually host The Caldmore Carnival which is based on different themes with the most recent being space.

Many late 19th and early 20th century terraced houses are still in existence around Caldmore. But clearance of the tower blocks began in 2004 and most of the high-rise flats have since been demolished. When one of the first tower blocks was demolished, the body of a man was discovered in one flat; he had not been seen for six years and was believed to have died of natural causes shortly after his last reported sighting, but the council had not served an eviction order because the flats had already been earmarked for demolition. The man's brother did arrive at the flat on at least once occasion, only to be told by a neighbour that his brother had either died or moved away.

Between 1950 and 1970, hundreds of immigrant families from the Commonwealth settled in Caldmore, and today it has a strong Asian community.

In 2016, residents complained of an increase in prostitution in the area, blaming police cutbacks.

National Express West Midlands and Diamond West Midlands operate the frequent bus routes 4/4H/4M through the village every few minutes Monday to Saturday daytime.
