= The Delves =

Neighbourhood of Walsall, England

Coordinates: 52.5639°N 1.9719°W

The Delves is a neighbourhood located in the south side of Walsall between Palfrey and Yew Tree estate in Walsall located on the outskirts of Walsall just before Sandwell.

== Employment ==
The RAC head office, along with a retail park, and several businesses are located in the Delves. A new barber shop has recently opened on the site of a former video rental shop. This has created 4 new jobs providing jobs for unemployed locals.

== Places of interest ==
The Bescot Stadium is in this neighbourhood, which not only hosts Walsall's football matches, but also has a popular Sunday market.

== Schools ==
The area has three primary aged schools, Whitehall Junior School (uniform green), Delves Infant School and Delves Junior School (uniform blue). The Delves schools are separated from Whitehall Juniors by the Broadway.

There is also one secondary school; Joseph Leckie Academy.

Delves has the West Entrance of the University of Wolverhampton's Walsall Campus. It is located directly adjacent to Whitehall Junior School.

== Sport ==
The Delves, as well as hosting Walsall Football Club's matches, is home to Walsall Rugby Football Club, which is based on Delves Road.
