= Walsall Arboretum =

Park in the West Midlands, England

Coordinates: 52.588°N 1.967°W

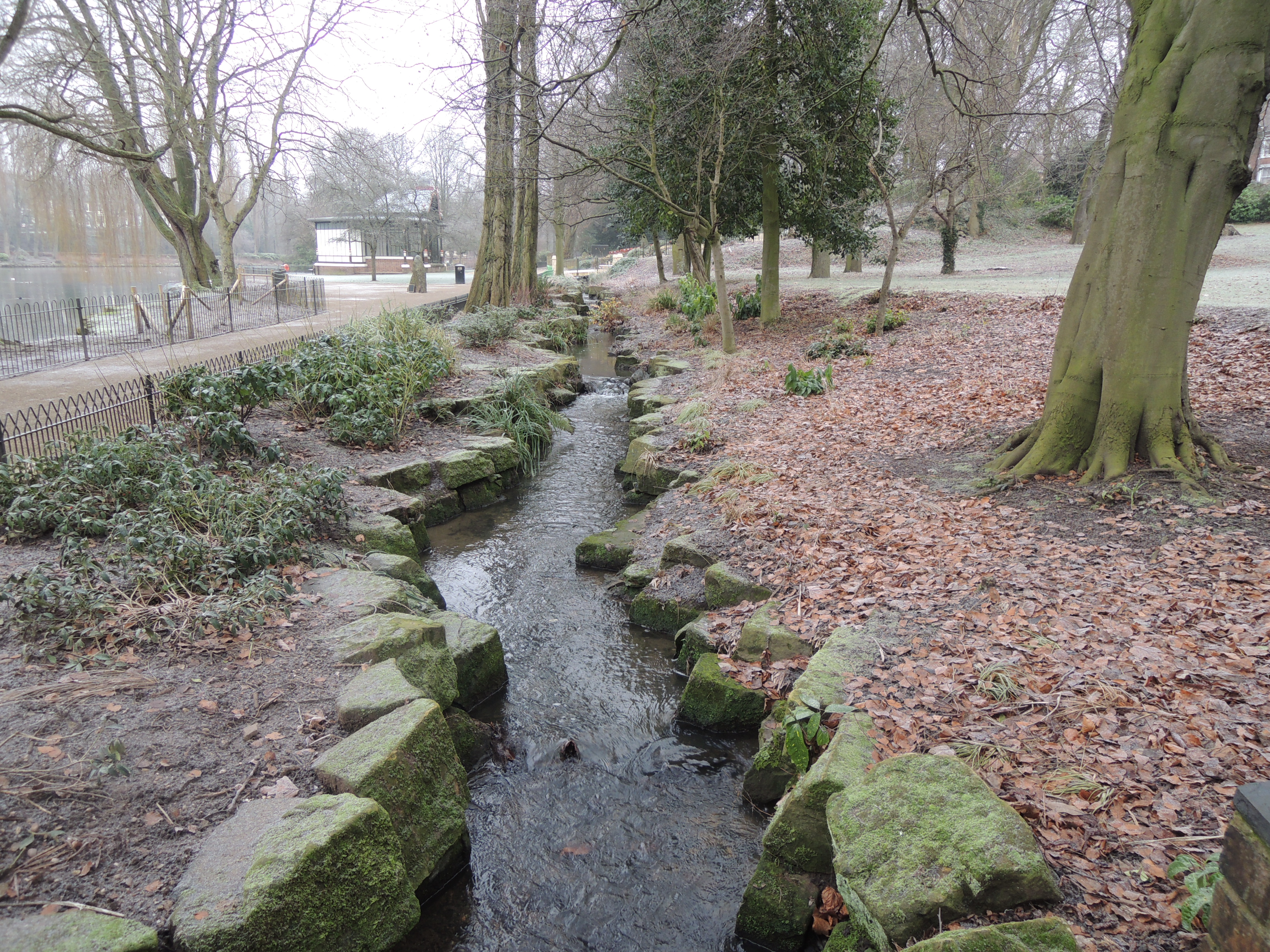
- Holbrook running through Walsall Arboretum

- Location within West Midlands county
- Type: Arboretum
- Location: Walsall
- Area: 170 acres (69 ha)
- Created: 1874
- Operator: Walsall Council

Walsall Arboretum is a Victorian public park located close to Walsall town centre in the West Midlands of England. Part of the park and surrounding housing are covered by the Arboretum conservation area. In the early 2010s, the park has undergone a major restoration and redevelopment programme funded largely by the National Lottery Heritage Fund.

== History ==
In 1848, John Eglington, a local surveyor, valued the estate at £160,000. In the 1860s, E. A. Foden first mooted the idea of turning the estate into a park and in 1871, the Walsall Arboretum and Lake Company was formed and issued a prospectus for shareholders describing the principal features. In 1873, a lease was drawn up for the creating of a park and the flooding of more land. The Arboretum was officially opened on 4 May 1874 by Lady Hatherton. The park consisted of two lakes, two lodges, a boathouse, bandstand, several summerhouses, a tree lined promenade, space for dancing, a flagpole, croquet lawns and a cricket ground. On 20 May 1875, severe weather caused extensive damage to the lake area.

Visitor numbers started to fall as a result of complaints over the lack of provision for children's activities. A cycle track was opened in 1876 as an attempt at boosting visitor numbers, however, in 1877, the company went into liquidation and the lease was surrendered to Lord Hatherton and a management committee of local businessmen took over. On 4 September 1877, an Article of Agreement stated that the land should only be used as a park. In the following year, a steam boat named "Lady of the Lake" was launched. In 1880, Thomas Everton was appointed the first park keeper and he moved into the main lodge. Heavy rain caused flooding and damage to the cycle track on 27 October 1880.

Due to public demand, the town council took over the Arboretum in 1881 on a three-year lease. Admissions became free. The park was officially re-opened on 21 July 1884 as the council's first "people's park". In 1885, bathing, boating, fishing and skating were banned from the lake, although fishing was allowed by permit. In January 1886, skating and curling were allowed. In May 1886, heavy rain caused more flooding and this caused the "Lady of the Lake" to sink. In 1889, the park received a cash injection which was used to improve the cycle path, greenhouse, lodges and flower beds.

In 1890, talks began between the town's clerk and Lord Hatherton to extend the Arboretum by another 13 acres (5.3 ha). A brick bridge was constructed over the Hoar Brook, replacing a timber one. The extension of the park was approved in 1891, although a proposed swimming baths was rejected. The extension was officially opened in 1892 and consisted of an outdoor gym for young people. Boating was reinstated on Hatherton Lake. In 1899, the bandstand was reconstructed.

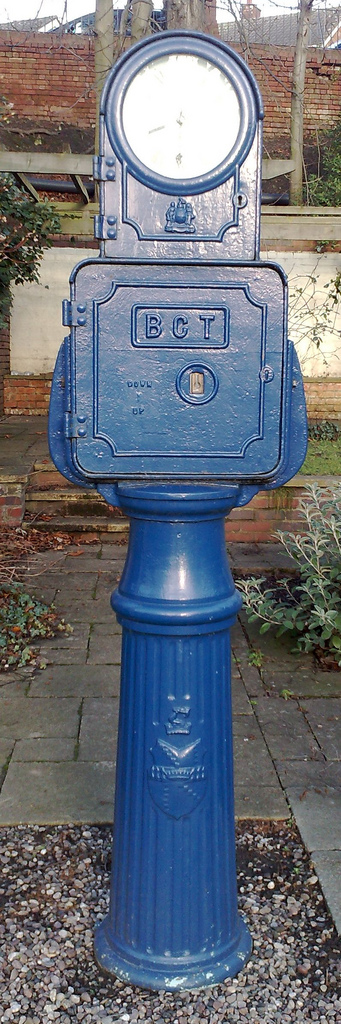
A Bundy Clock used by Birmingham City Transport to ensure that bus drivers did not depart from outlying termini before the due time; now preserved at the Arboretum.

In 1900, H. E. Lavender was selected in a competition to design a pavilion to include refreshment room accommodation. The pavilion was completed and opened in May 1902. In 1904, stocks were moved from the High Street to the lake area. In 1908, significant maintenance work was carried out on the park which included the laying of new turf, reparation of the stocks and the concreting of part of the course of Hoar Brook. Construction commenced in 1912 on new outdoor swimming pools beside the brook.

During World War I, the park was used to grow potatoes and timber which was supplied to the Walsall War Agricultural Committee. The Women's Volunteer Reserve helped with park maintenance. Construction of the new outdoor swimming pools was put on hold until 1919.

In 1922, a further 20 acres (8.1 ha) were added to the park, mostly by Featherstone-Dilke, on the condition that its development should provide work for the unemployed. In 1923, the park was visited by the Prince of Wales to pay tribute to ex-servicemen. In April 1924, a new bandstand was opened in the park. Two tubular swings, two giant strides and a merry-go-round were acquired from Johnson Bros and Co Ltd. in 1924 and added to the park, which was also extended by a further 5 acres (2.0 ha) following the purchase of land from Mr Mellish. It was extended again in 1930 with the donation of 20 acres (8.1 ha) of land by Featherstone-Dilke. In 1931, the Pavilion Refreshment Room closed and was reopened in 1936 as the Joseph Leckie Sons of Rest, a social club for elderly men. In 1935, 50 acres (20 ha) of land were purchased from Fred Smith.

During World War II, 100 allotment plots were provided. The water level in Hatherton Lake was raised in preparation for fire fighting following bombing raids. In 1952, 15 acres (6.1 ha) of land were purchased to connect the park to the canal. The open air baths were closed and filled in around 1956. A garden for the blind by the Lichfield Street lodge, on a former bowling green, was opened in 1958.

In 1965, exploration began for tunnels connecting the Littleton Street mine workings, however none were found. In 1967, proposals for a new roundabout and flyover scheme that would have demolished the Clock Tower and lodge were rejected due to public pressure. In 1972, a proposal by Featherstone-Dilke to construct housing on the northern edge of the park was rejected following a public enquiry. On 19 April 1989, 31.32ha of land consisting of the original Arboretum and surrounding housing was designated a conservation area.

In 1995, a Charter Mark was awarded to the Arboretum for excellence and diversity in the services it offered. It was re-awarded in 1999 and in the same year, a rare species of white-clawed crayfish was discovered in Hatherton Lake.

=== Walsall Illuminations ===
From 1951 to 2008 the Arboretum hosted the Walsall Illuminations each autumn for six weeks. The first show was held in 1951 by the Festival Committee, although illuminations have taken place at the park since 1875 when candles were placed in coloured jars.

In February 2009 it was announced that the Illuminations would be suspended due to financial constraints, the event having run at a loss for a number of years. In March 2011 it was confirmed that the Illuminations would be scrapped permanently. The last Illuminations was held in 2008 with a record low attendance, making a loss of £167,000. In October 2026, Walsall Council was exploring the possibility of bringing back the illuminations from October 2027.

== Sporting activities ==
- A bowling green and club house
- Tennis Courts
- Table Tennis Tables

Since 10 March 2012, Walsall Arboretum has hosted a weekly parkrun. Originally, this took place in the arboretum extension, starting and finishing near the skate park, however as the Victorian section of the park was renovated, the course moved into the arboretum itself, initially based by the bowling pavilion and then, as works finished, to its current location near centre green. Irrespective of location, the course has remained a little over three laps. The first event saw 55 participants run the course, supported by 18 volunteers.

Walsall Arboretum has also hosted other running events

- Race for Life
- Walsall Run (10km)
- Acorns Santa Run

== Geography ==
The Arboretum has an area of over 80 acres (32 ha). It comprises a number of distinct areas, including:

- Hatherton Lake (boating lake)
- Several acres of open playing fields
- A children's play area
- A Splash Pad

The park is home to over 10,000 species of tree and shrub.

== See also ==
- List of conservation areas in the West Midlands
