= Pleck =

Suburb of Walsall, West Midlands, England

Coordinates: 52.5749°N 2.0049°W

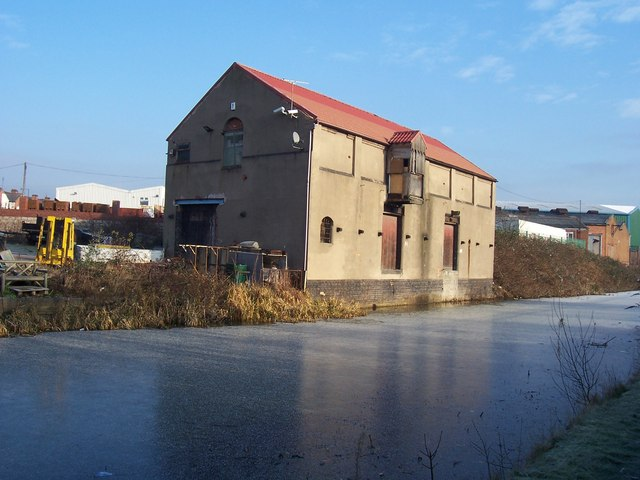
A canalside warehouse in Pleck

Pleck, in the borough of Walsall, neighbours Palfrey and stretches from the bridge on Wednesbury Road to Junction 9 of the M6 motorway. It consists of a large green space called Pleck Park and housing estates. Pleck is close to Walsall Manor Hospital and Bescot Stadium, home of Walsall F.C.

The population of this Walsall ward taken at the 2011 Census was 15,014.

The neighbourhood has a primary school. Most of the houses on the estate were built by the local authority during the 1950s.

The Walsall-Wolverhampton Line runs alongside Pleck Park, and once included Pleck railway station.
