= Queslett =

Coordinates: 52.553015°N 1.908896°W

Queslett is an area in Great Barr, on the border of Birmingham, and Aldridge, England. It sits between Pheasey, Kingstanding, Old Oscott and the central Great Barr area.

It includes Booths Lane and other roads in the south and Aldridge Road in the north. Through the area runs the A4041 Queslett Road.

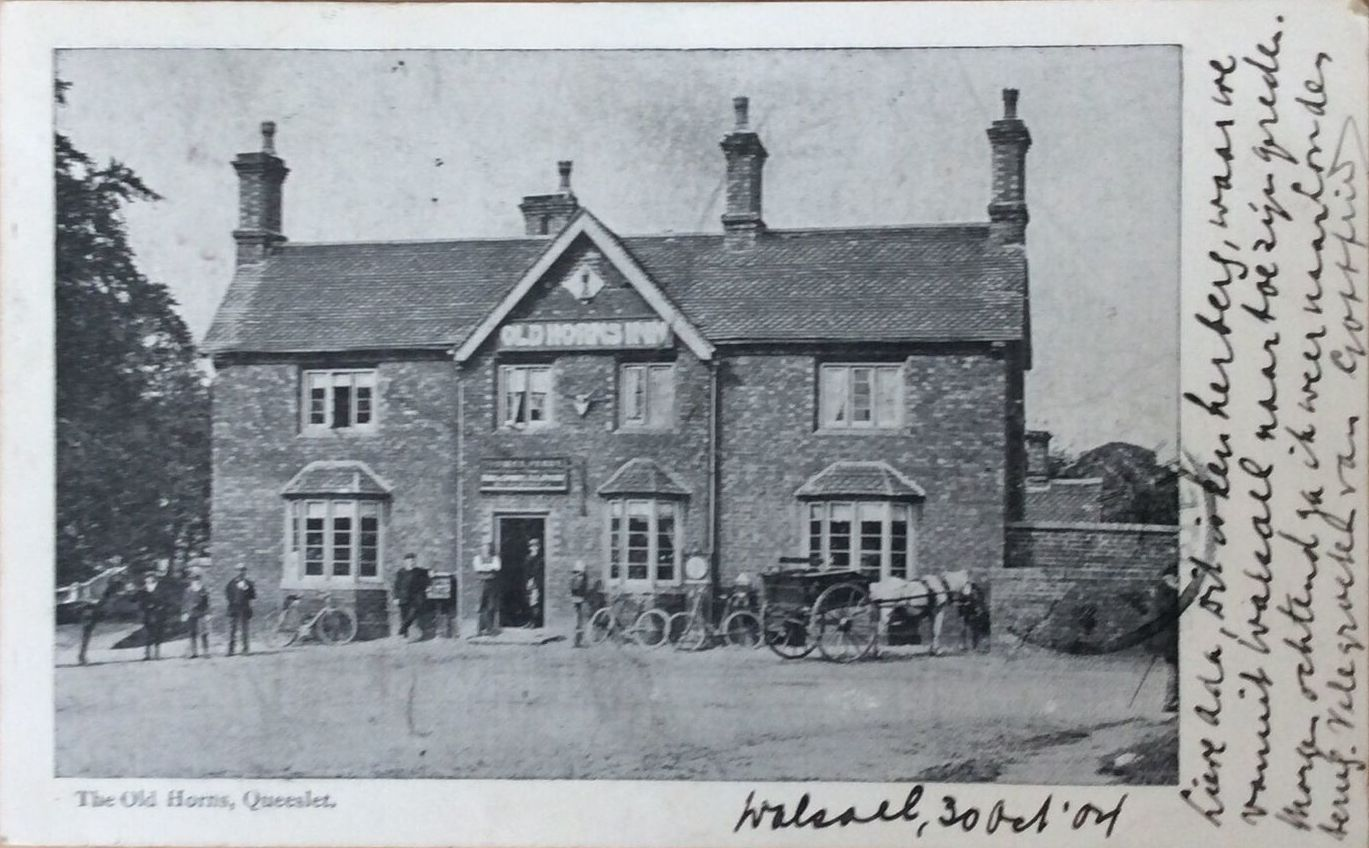
Postcard, postally used in 1904, showing The Old Horns public house (since rebuilt), and labelled "Queeslet"

The name (originally Quieslade) has been in use since the 16th century. The first part, from "Queest", means a wood pigeon, the second comes from the Anglo-Saxon "slade", for a small valley. Another old spelling, Queeslet, appears on Victorian maps and postcards.

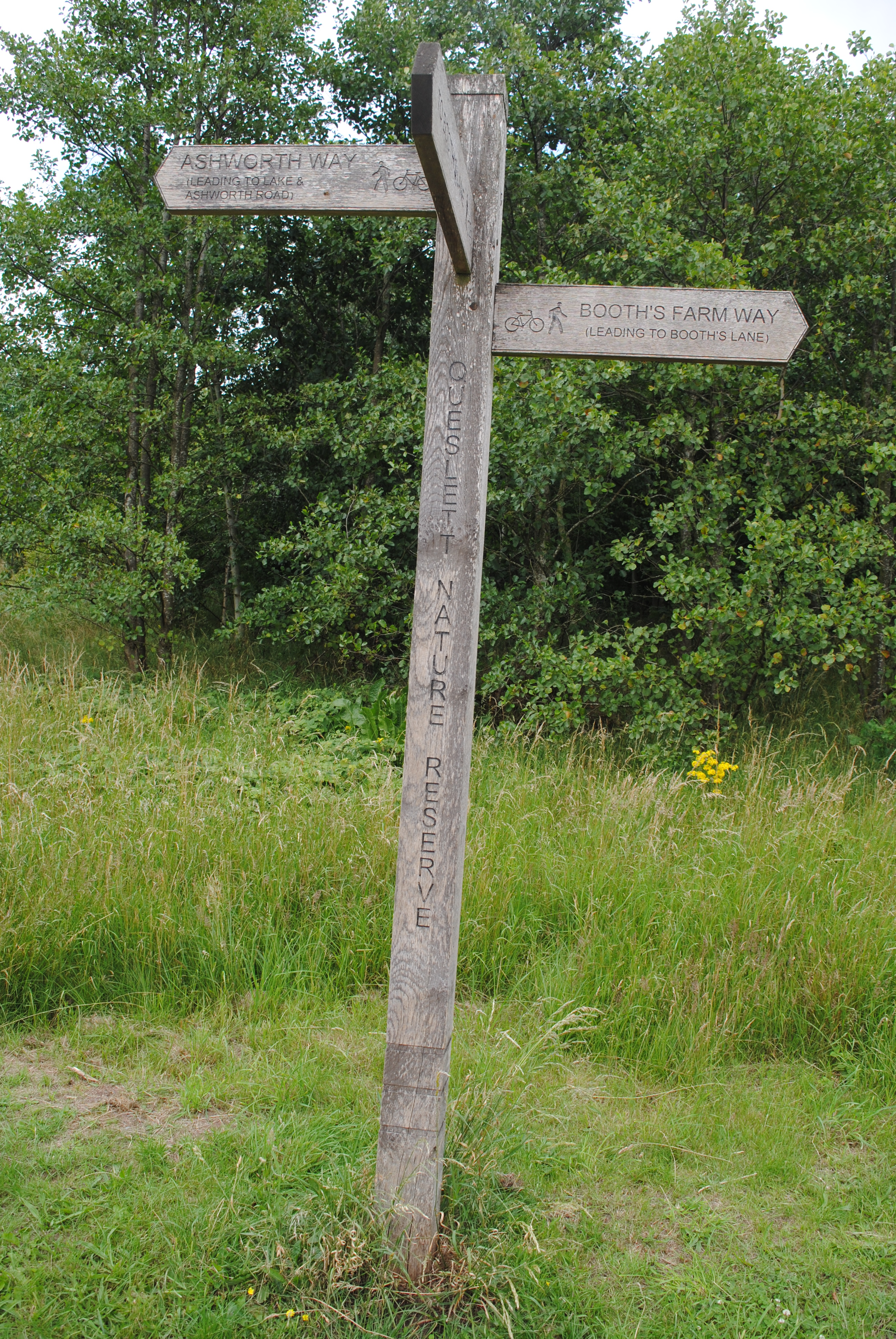
A fingerpost at Queslett Nature Reserve, in July 2020

The area was in Staffordshire, until part was absorbed into Birmingham, then in Warwickshire, in 1928; the Aldridge side became part of Walsall Metropolitan Borough in 1974, when Walsall and Birmingham also became part of the West Midlands county.

In 1810, in A Complete History of the Druids, T G Lomax described the area:

At the declivity of very pleasingly diversified hills, near Quieslade, is a most delightful lake, by crossing the head of which, the admirer of variegated landscape will be amply rewarded by an agreeable range over the opposite hills, where the High-Wood and Barr Beacon present themselves to view; and by gradually climbing the first of these two summits, the south-east prospect becomes very rich and extensive; and the latter presents an unbounded panorama into fifteen counties, which PLOT, in his History of Staffordshire, has specified.

(the later being a reference to Robert Plot's Natural History of Staffordshire).

The area was mostly developed with private housing from the 1930s onwards, and is centred on the A4041 Queslett Road between West Bromwich and Sutton Coldfield, overlooked by Barr Beacon. A former sand quarry, on the site of William Booth's farm, was subsequently used for landfill. One half of the site is now Queslett Nature Reserve. The Moonstones, an artwork commemorating The Lunar Society, who met at nearby Great Barr Hall, stands in the grounds of a supermarket, on the site of the quarry's former office.

== See also ==
- The Moonstones
