= St Mary's Church, Aldridge =

St. Mary's Church
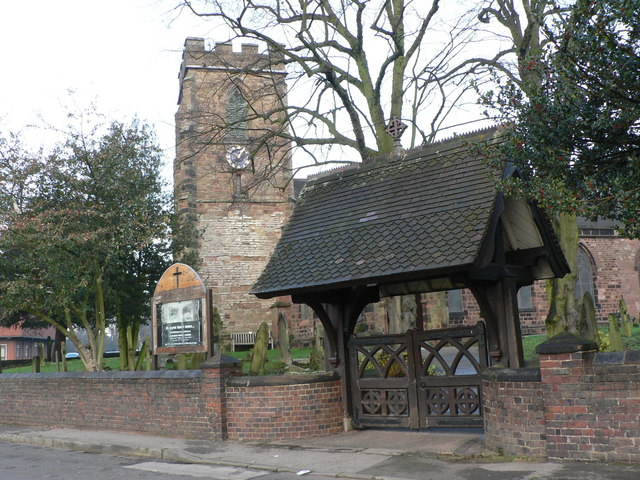
- St. Mary's Church
- 52.6043°N 1.9126°W
- OS grid reference: SK 06014 00735
- Location: The Green, Aldridge, Walsall, West Midlands
- Country: England
- Denomination: Church of England
- Website: www.aldridgeparish.org.uk

History
- Founder: Before 1257

Administration
- Parish: Aldridge

Clergy
- Rector: Revd Steve Doel

St. Mary's Church is the parish church of Aldridge, a town in the Metropolitan Borough of Walsall, England. It is operated by the Church of England. The church is grade-II* listed.

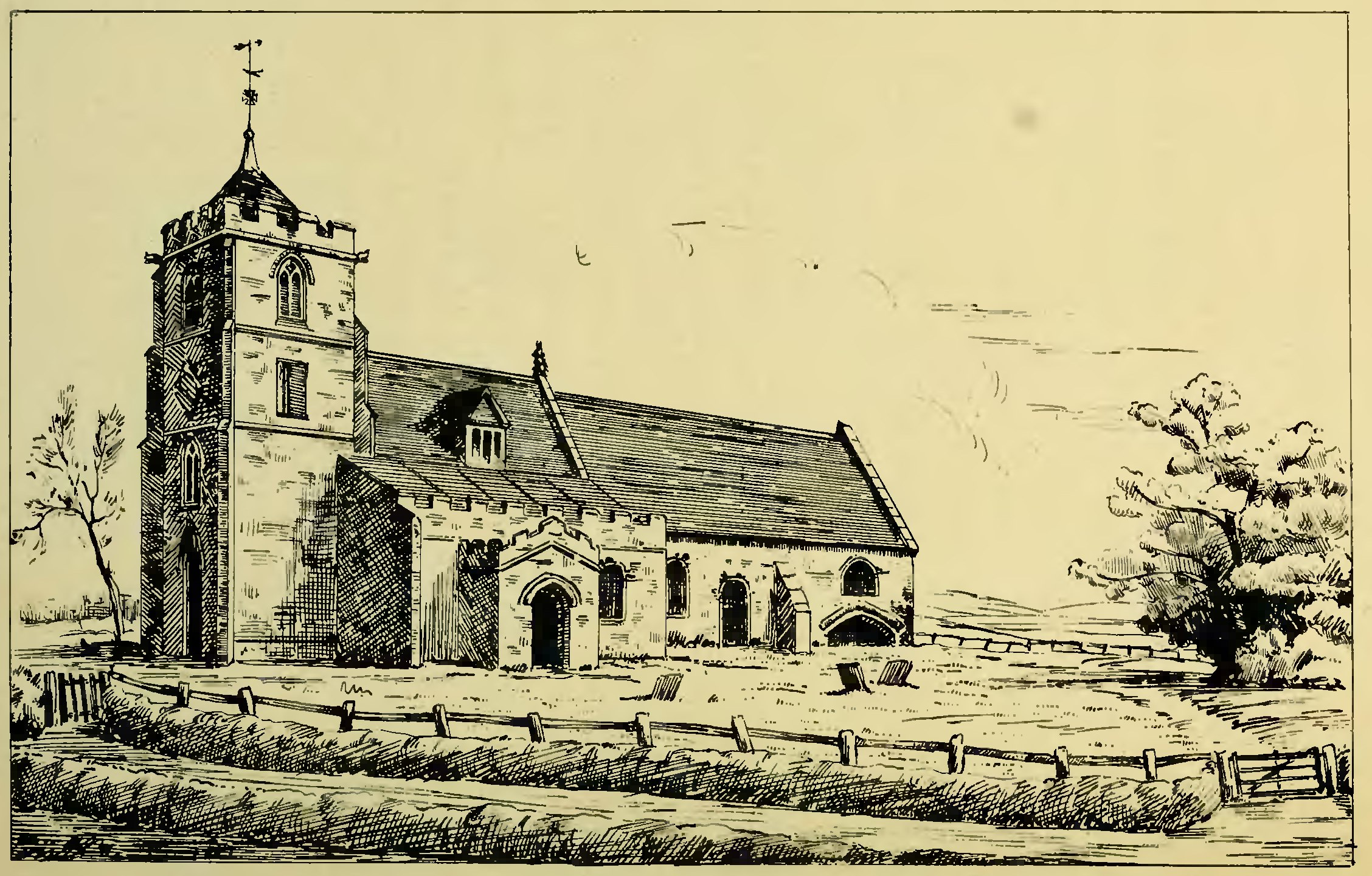
South view of the church, as it was in 1800, from an engraving in Stebbing Shaw's "History of Staffordshire."

Records show that it was built before 1257. Other than the 14th-century tower, all the exterior walls were added or rebuilt between the years 1841–1853.

A separate parish, of Great Barr, was created from Aldridge parish in 1866. Its parish church is St. Margaret's, which had existed as a chapel of St Mary's by at least 1552.

A south vestry was added in 1975. Between 1991 and 1995, the pews and choir stalls were removed.

The church has two medieval effigies, of Sir Robert de Stapleton (active c. 1282–1301), lord of the Manor of Great Barr and Aldridge; and of a 14th-century priest, possibly Roger de Elyngton.

The church's historic records are held at Staffordshire Record Office.

Aldridge's war memorial stands on the green next to the church.

The current Rector is the Revd Steve Doel.

A 1955 painting of the church by the then Rector, the Rev Ronald William Cartmel, is in the collection of The New Art Gallery Walsall.
