= Brian Sherratt =

Brian Sherratt may refer to:

- Brian Sherratt (educator) (born 1942), British educator, headmaster of Great Barr School
- Brian Sherratt (footballer) (1944-2021), British footballer
