= Q3 Academy Great Barr =

Location
- Wilderness Lane; Great Barr, West Midlands, B43 7SD; England; 52°33′13″N 1°56′42″W

Information
- Type: Academy
- Local authority: Sandwell
- Trust: The Mercian Trust
- Department for Education URN: 135449 Tables
- Ofsted: Reports
- Head of School: Chris Bury
- Gender: Coeducational
- Age: 11 to 19
- Enrolment: 1046
- Website: http://www.q3academy.org.uk/

Q3 Academy Great Barr (formerly Dartmouth High School) is a coeducational secondary school located on Wilderness Lane in Great Barr, West Midlands, England, near the border with Birmingham. It comes within the borders of Metropolitan Borough of Sandwell.

== History ==
Dartmouth High School opened in September 1964 as a secondary modern school, becoming comprehensive in September 1969. The original motto, suggested by the Classics Teacher (later a drama teacher) Mr Bruce Graham was, "Gaudet, Tentamine et Virtus" (Strength rejoices in challenge).

The School originally had 8 houses, four in the A half and four in the B half. The A half houses were Churchill, Elgar, Sutherland and Nuffield. The B half houses were Hillary, Curie, Kennedy and Fleming. In the 1980s Nuffield and Hillary stopped taking pupils, leaving three active Houses in each half of the school.

It became Q3 Academy in September 2008, although it initially existed in the old Dartmouth buildings. In August 2008, the project to rebuild the school began. It took 21 months to build, and was ready for students in April 2010, straight after the Easter Holiday. The old building was demolished and the final landscaping phase took place over the summer of 2010, ready for students to start in September of that year.

As an academy, it is independent, with limited power remaining with the local authority.

On 11 November 2010, HRH the Earl of Wessex officially opened the Academy.

As Q3 Academy Langley and Q3 Academy Tipton have since been established by the Multi-Academy Trust, the original Q3 Academy has been renamed Q3 Academy Great Barr.

=== School Fires ===
In 1985 the western edge of the School, including the main Churchill block and Sutherland (including the school kitchens) were seriously damaged in a fire believed to be caused by arson. First year (now called year 7) pupils were allocated form rooms in temporary buildings on the tennis courts and the Maths and English departments used Temporary huts well into the 1990s whilst large sections of the School was rebuilt.

In the five years before the creation of the academy, the original school was damaged by fire on two further occasions. The school's science block was destroyed by fire on 17 November 2003 and had to be completely rebuilt. It needed about 100 firefighters to bring the blaze under control. Around 200 pupils lost their coursework in the blaze. There was also a blaze in June 2006 in the first year block. The cause of the fire was because while some engineers were working to fix a spark in the wires, one spark got out of control and the workers accidentally set the building on fire causing a blaze. This was caused accidentally.

== Notable alumni ==
- John Bainbridge, author and countryside campaigner
- John Constandinou, athlete
- Cat Deeley, television personality
- Matt Goodwin, managing director of architecture initiative
- James Holmes, actor
- Matthew Marsden, actor
- Arun Singh, Professional Trader, Investor and Mentor
- Dean Smith, footballer
- Gillian Wearing, artist
- Steve Webb, Liberal Democrat MP
- Rob Young, author
- Tim Jones, Olympian
