= Barr Beacon =

Hill in Walsall, West Midlands, England

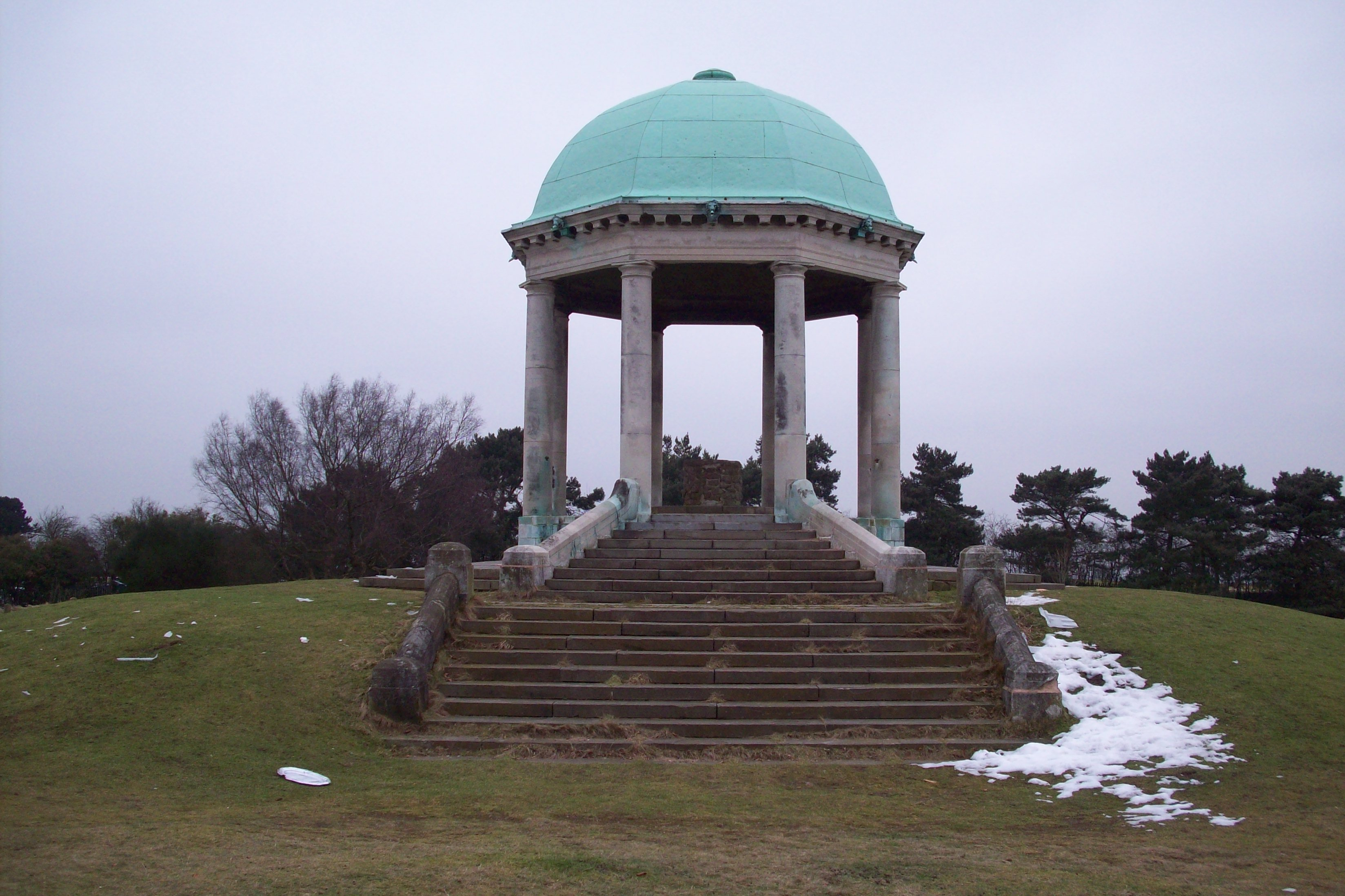
- Barr Beacon War Memorial in February 2009

Highest point
- Elevation: 236 m (774 ft)
- Coordinates: 52.5736°N 1.9107°W

Geography
- Location: West Midlands, England
- OS grid: SP060973
- Topo map: OS Landranger 139

Barr Beacon is a hill on the edge of Walsall, West Midlands, England, very near the border with Birmingham. It gives its name to nearby Great Barr (the Beacon borders the Pheasey area of Great Barr) and to the local secondary school Barr Beacon School. It is historically the site of a beacon where fires were lit in times of impending attack or on celebratory occasions. The site is on green belt land and is of local importance for nature conservation, as defined by Walsall Borough Council, who have designated some 60 acres (25 ha) of it as a Local Nature Reserve.

== Ownership and management ==
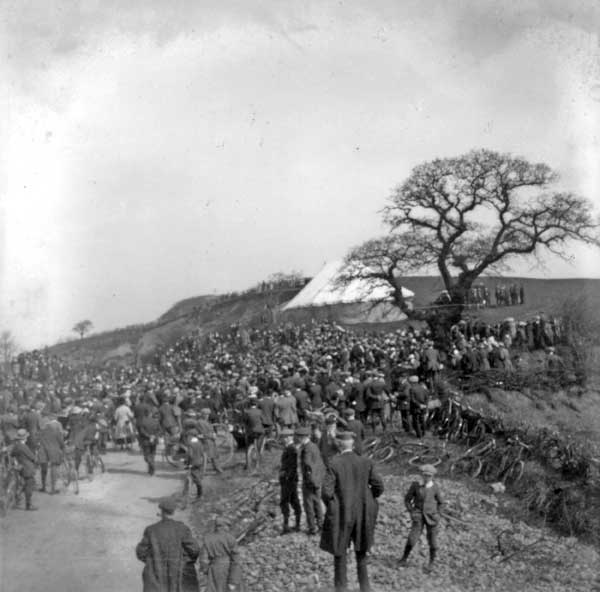
The opening ceremony in April 1919

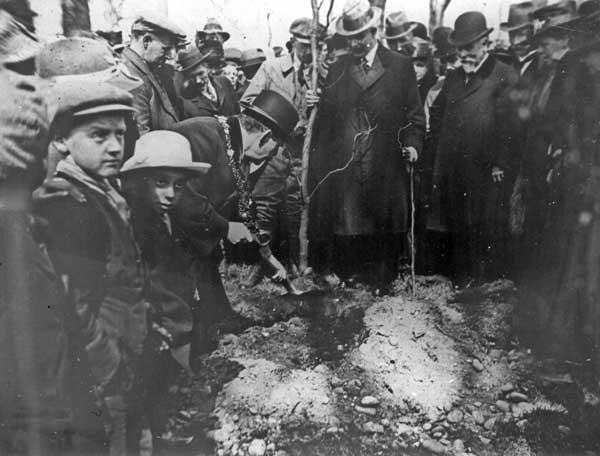
Tree planting at The opening ceremony, by the Mayor, A. J. Llewellen

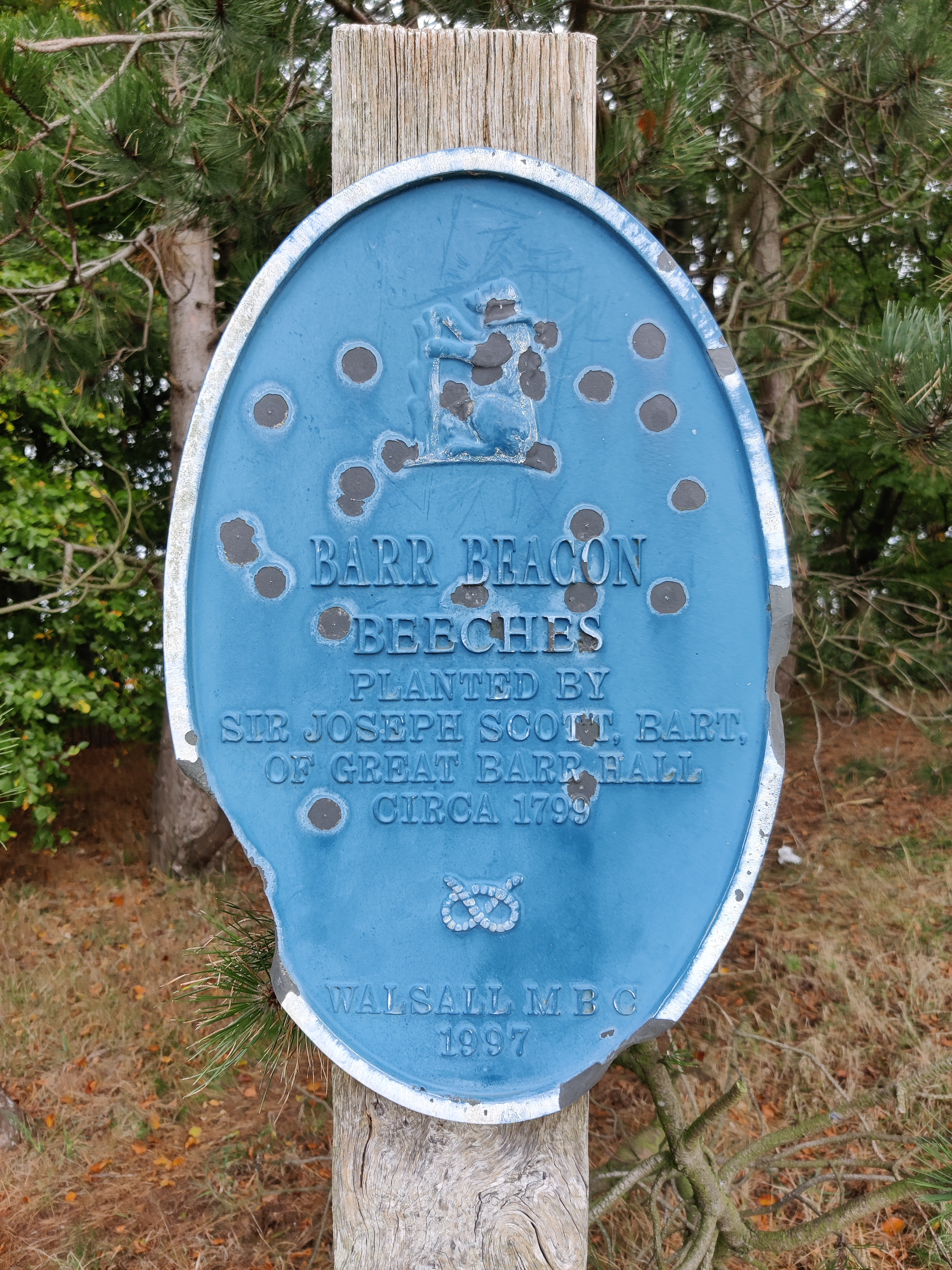
Blue plaque, erected 1997, marking the planting of Beech trees by Sir Joseph Scott Bart., of Great Barr Hall, circa 1799

Barr Beacon was formerly owned by the Scott family of Great Barr Hall, nearby. Following the death of Lady Mildred Scott in 1909, the estate was auctioned off in 1918. Birmingham's Lord Mayor made a plea for the site to be secured as a public park. Colonel J. H. Wilkinson of the Staffordshire Volunteer Infantry Brigade responded by purchasing it, then transferring it to a trust. It opened to the public on Easter Monday, 21 April 1919. In 1972, the trusteeship of Barr Beacon passed to Walsall Council. The council now manages Barr Beacon on behalf of the Barr Beacon Trust., with a management committee comprising local councillors and representatives of interest groups. During both 2002 and 2003 the site attracted an estimated 200,000 visitors.

== Views ==
As one of the highest points in the West Midlands county, Barr Beacon has panoramic views. According to the Walsall Council website, visible landmarks include The Wrekin, Cannock Chase, the Lickey Hills, Lichfield Cathedral, Aldridge Airport, and Birmingham city centre, and at least eleven counties are visible, including Powys in Wales.

== Memorial ==
On one summit is Barr Beacon Reservoir, a South Staffordshire Waterworks Company covered drinking water reservoir with radio masts and on the other a war memorial consisting of a raised dais, covered by a copper-clad wooden dome supported by eight columns. On the night of 5 March 2010, thieves stole some of the copper roofing, damaging much more in the process; this happened again twice in 2011. In early 2013, the copper sheeting was replaced using green zinc-coated panels, and CCTV was installed.

== See also ==
- Beacon Way
