= Heart of England Way =

Long-distance walk through the Midlands of England

Coordinates: 52.3818°N 1.6814°W

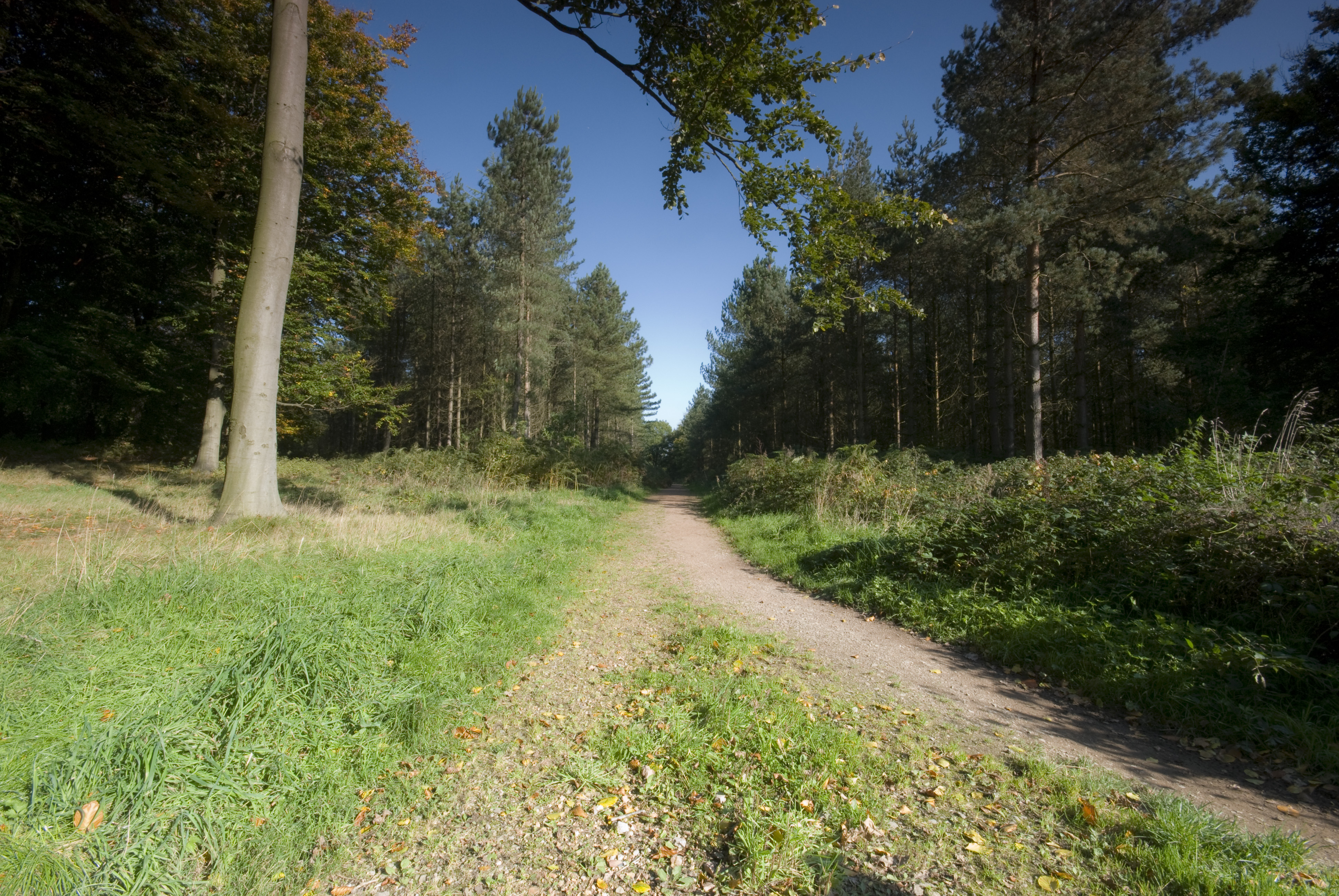
- Cannock Chase lies on the trail
- Length: 160 km (99 mi)
- Location: England
- Trailheads: Cotswolds; Cannock Chase
- Use: Hiking

The Heart of England Way is a long-distance walk of around 160 km (100 mi) through the Midlands of England. The walk starts from Milford Common on Cannock Chase and ends at Bourton on the Water in the Cotswolds linking south Staffordshire through Warwickshire to east Gloucestershire (or vice versa).

It crosses six others: the Beacon Way, Staffordshire Way, Two Saints Way, Arden Way, Cotswold Way, and Oxfordshire Way. It is maintained by the Heart of England Way Association.

== Places on the way ==
- Milford
- Cannock Chase
- Castle Ring
- Lichfield
- Drayton Bassett
- Shustoke
- Meriden
- Berkswell
- Balsall Common
- Rowington
- Henley-in-Arden
- Alcester
- Bidford-on-Avon
- Upper Quinton
- Mickleton
- Chipping Campden
- Longborough
- Bourton-on-the-Water

== Gallery ==
Sites along the Heart of England Way
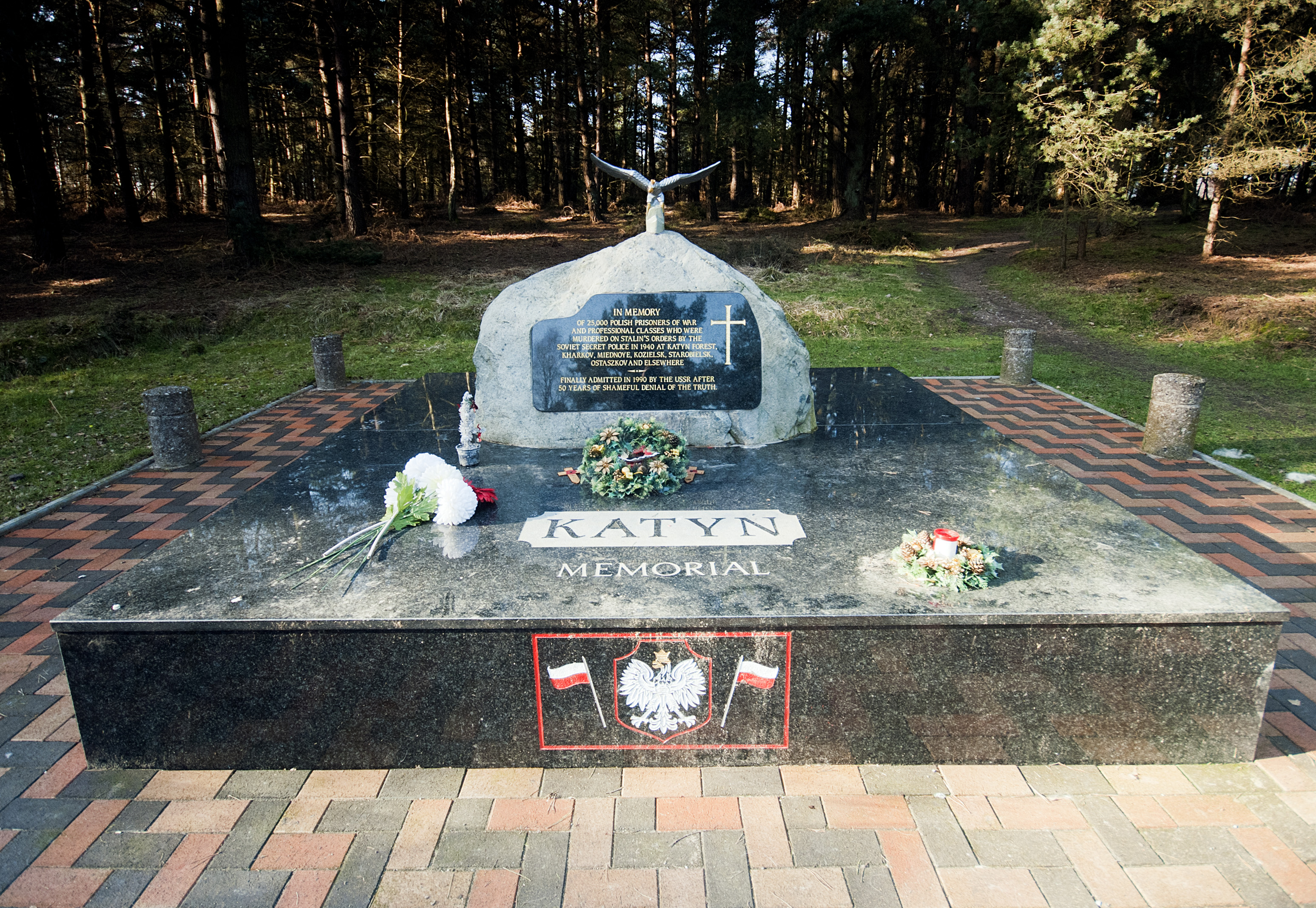
Katyn Memorial on Cannock Chase

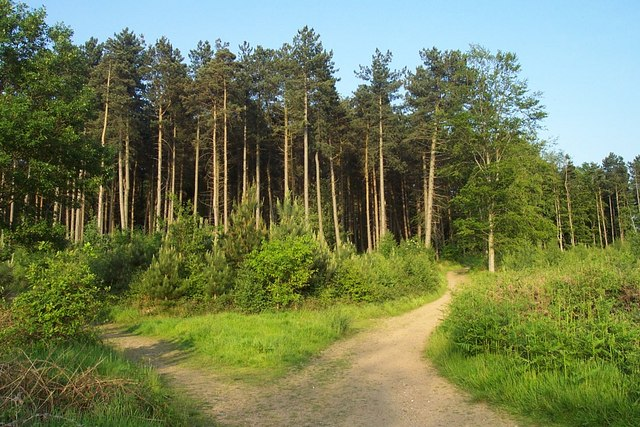
Cannock Chase

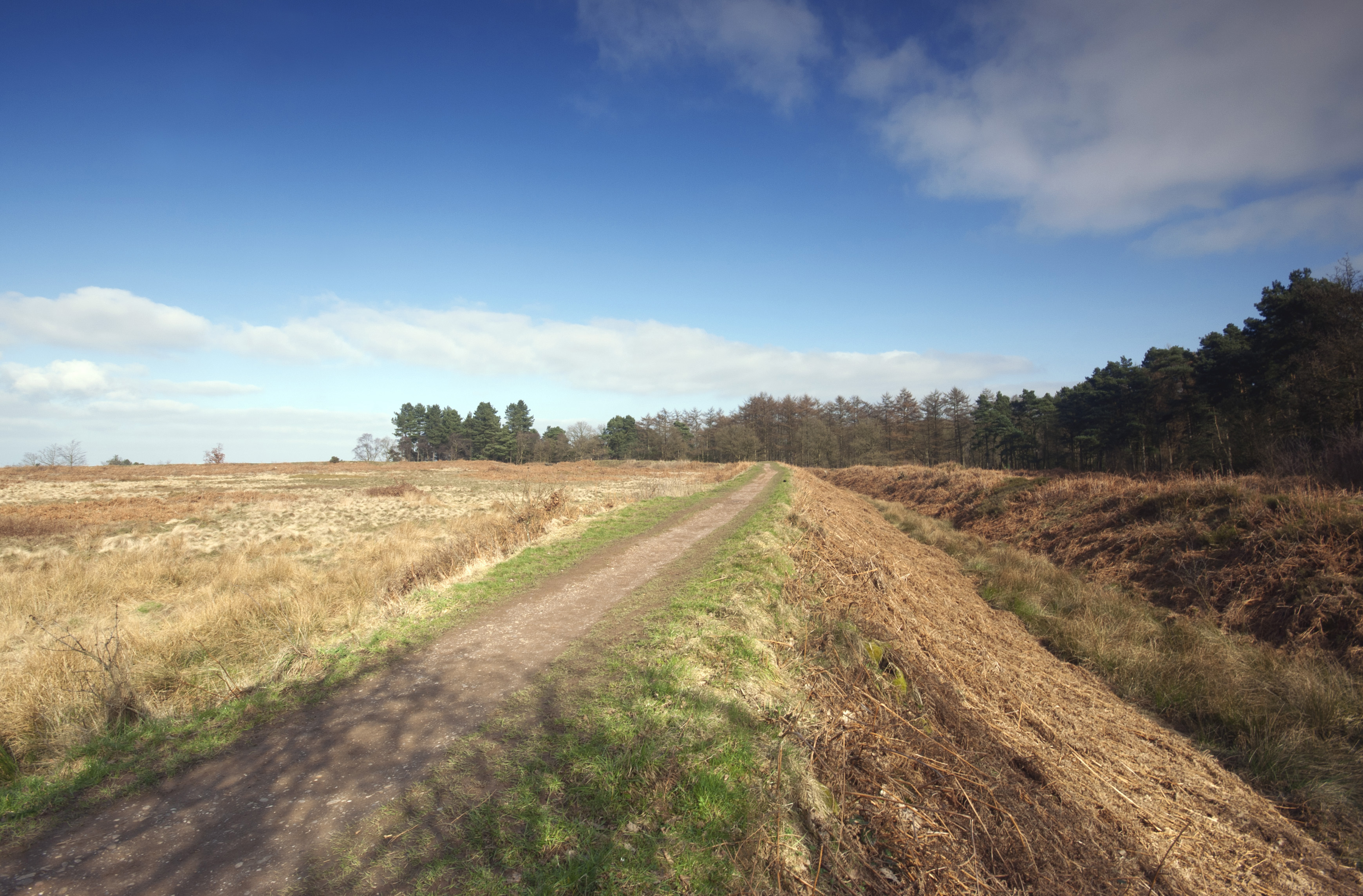
Castle Ring

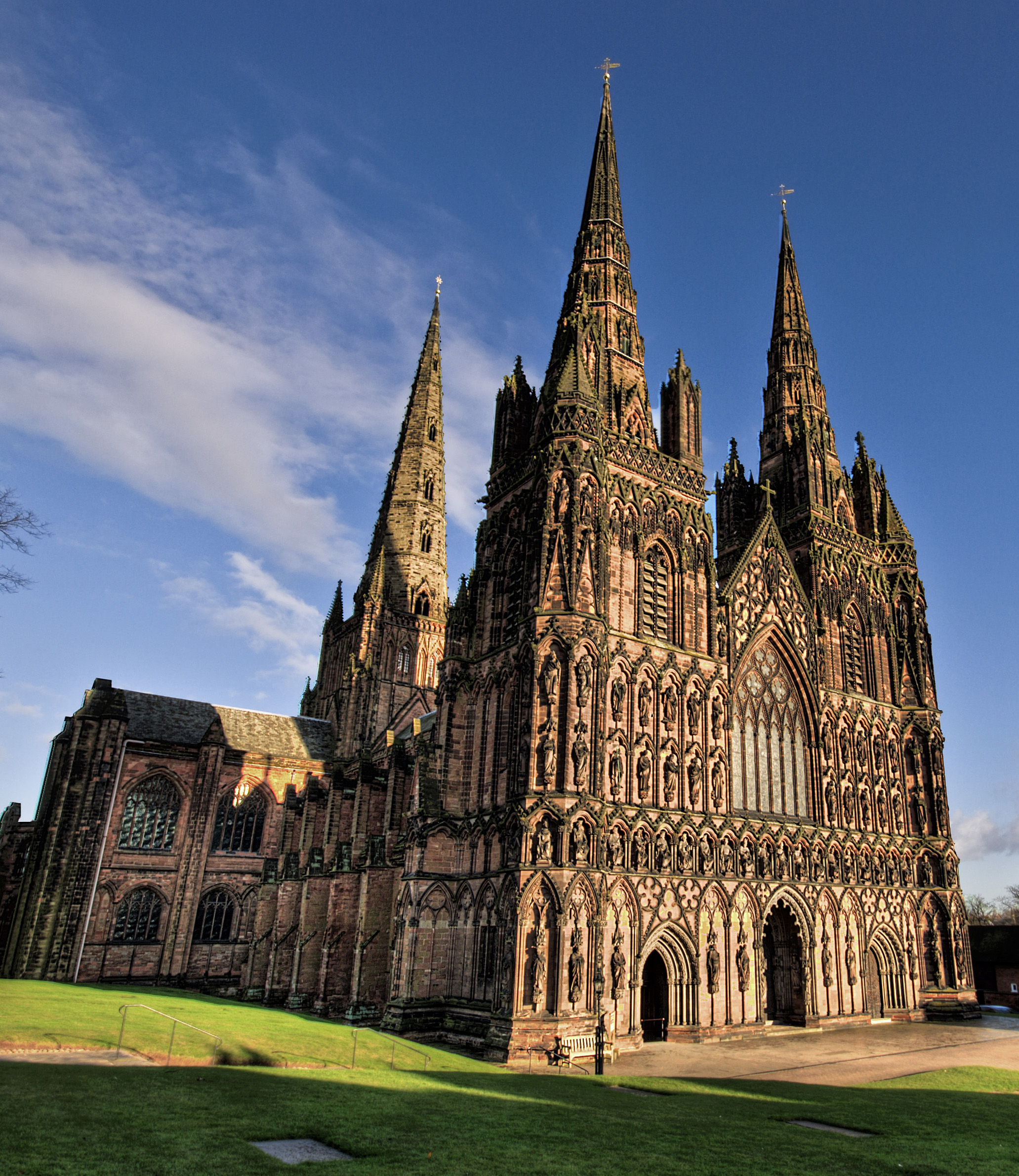
Lichfield Cathedral

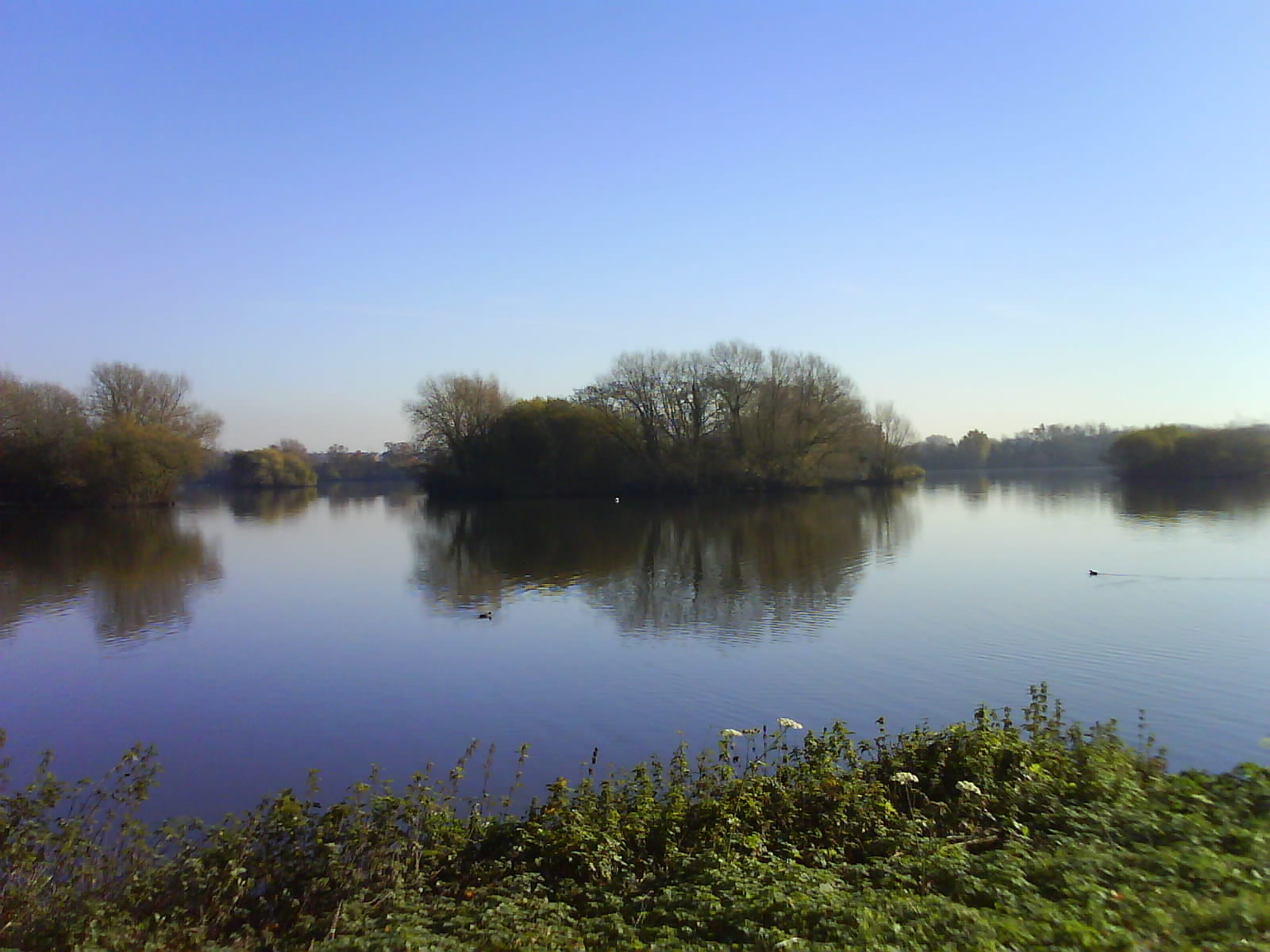
Kingsbury Water Park

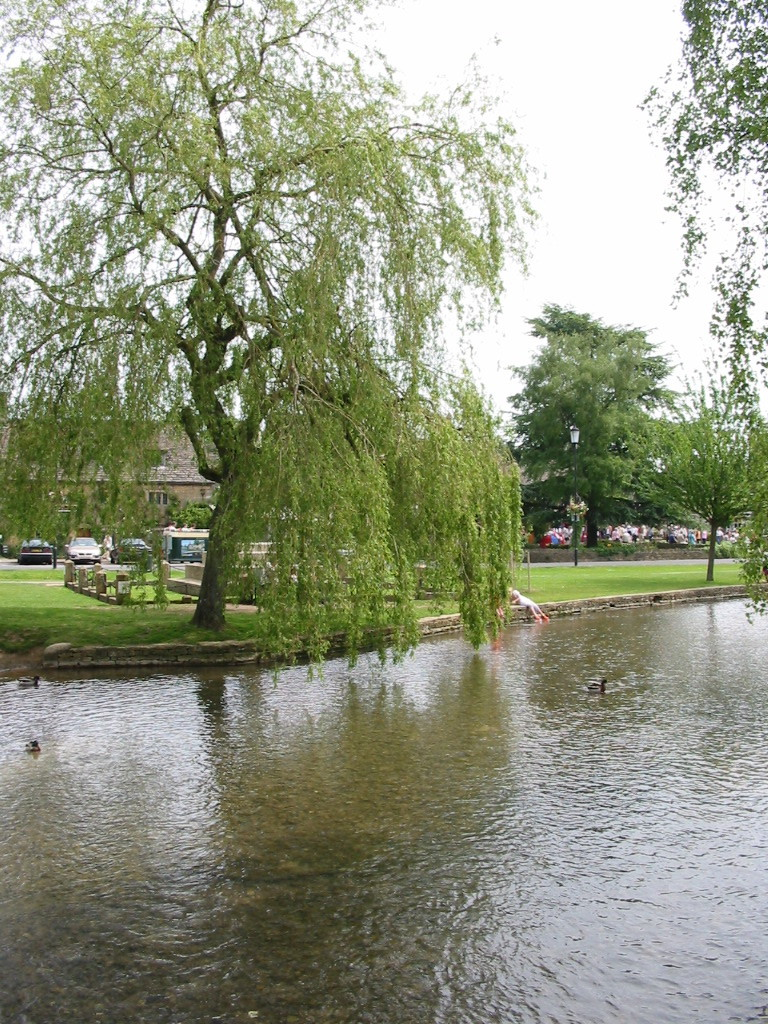
Bourton on the Water
