= Beacon Way =

Walking path in the Midlands of England

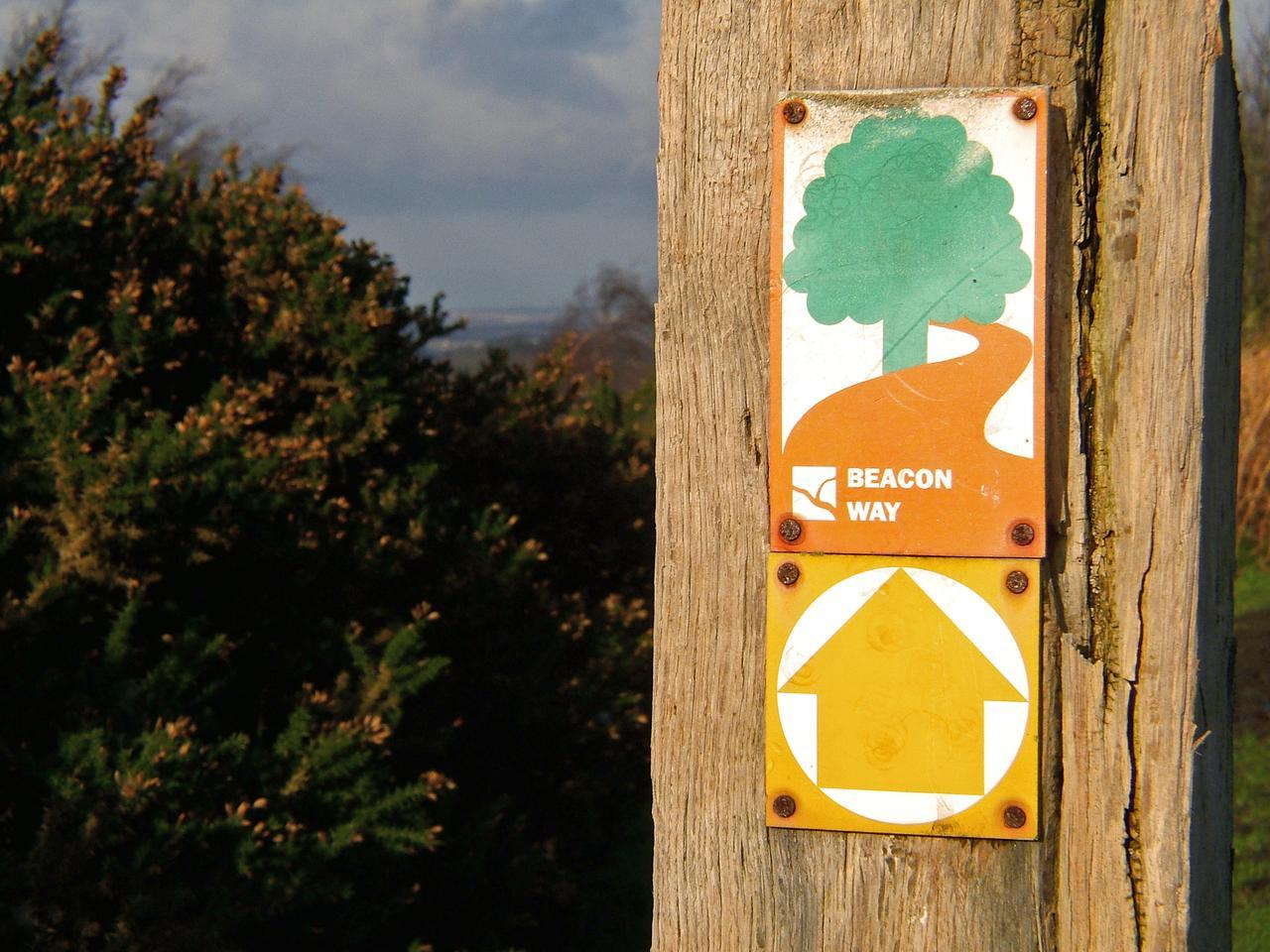
- A Beacon Way signpost
- Length: 40 km (25 mi)
- Location: central England
- Designation: UK National Trail
- Trailheads: Sandwell Park Farm, West Bromwich; 52.5199°N 1.9743°W; Gentleshaw, Staffordshire; 52.7039°N 1.9258°W
- Use: Hiking
- Highest point: Barr Beacon, 227 m (745 ft)

The Beacon Way is a long-distance walk of around 40 kilometres (25 mi) through the West Midlands county and Staffordshire, in the Midlands of England. It takes its name from Barr Beacon, a hill to the east of Walsall, and one of the highest points in the West Midlands. The Beacon Way starts at Sandwell Park Farm in Sandwell Valley Country Park and extends as far as Gentleshaw Common where it connects with the Heart of England Way.
