= St Margaret's Church, Great Barr =

Church Of St Margaret
- St Margaret's Church
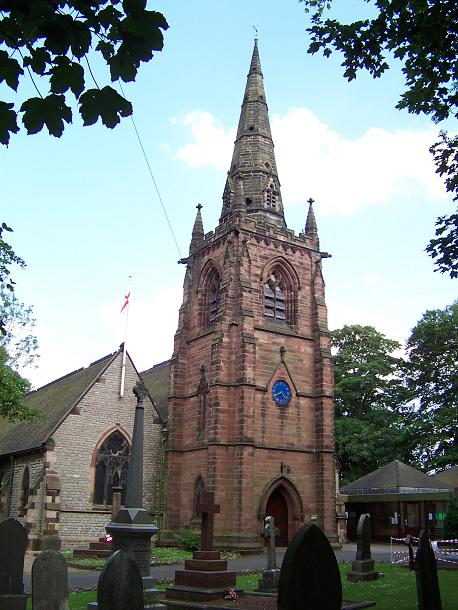
- The church in June 2005
- Church Of St Margaret
- 52.560015°N 1.930628°W
- OS grid reference: SP 04894 95846
- Location: Great Barr, Walsall
- Country: England
- Denomination: Anglican
- Website: www.stmargaretsgreatbarr.org.uk

History
- Status: Operational
- Dedication: Saint Margaret of Antioch

Architecture
- Heritage designation: Grade II listed
- Designated: July 1986

Specifications
- Materials: Limestone rubble; Red sandstone dressing; Tile roof

Clergy
- Vicar: Reverend Canon Ben Whitmore

The Church Of St Margaret (also known as St Margaret's Church), is the Anglican parish church of Great Barr and is located on Chapel Lane, Walsall, England. It is dedicated to Saint Margaret of Antioch.

Originally a chapel, known to have existed by 1552, of St Mary's Church, in the parish of Aldridge, Staffordshire, a full parish was created in 1866.

The church was rebuilt in 1862, by Griffin. The tower was built of brick in 1677, but this is completely hidden by a Gothic Revival red sandstone casing added in 1893. The spire is 18th-century. The pulpit, in alabaster, was made to a design by Walter Tapper.

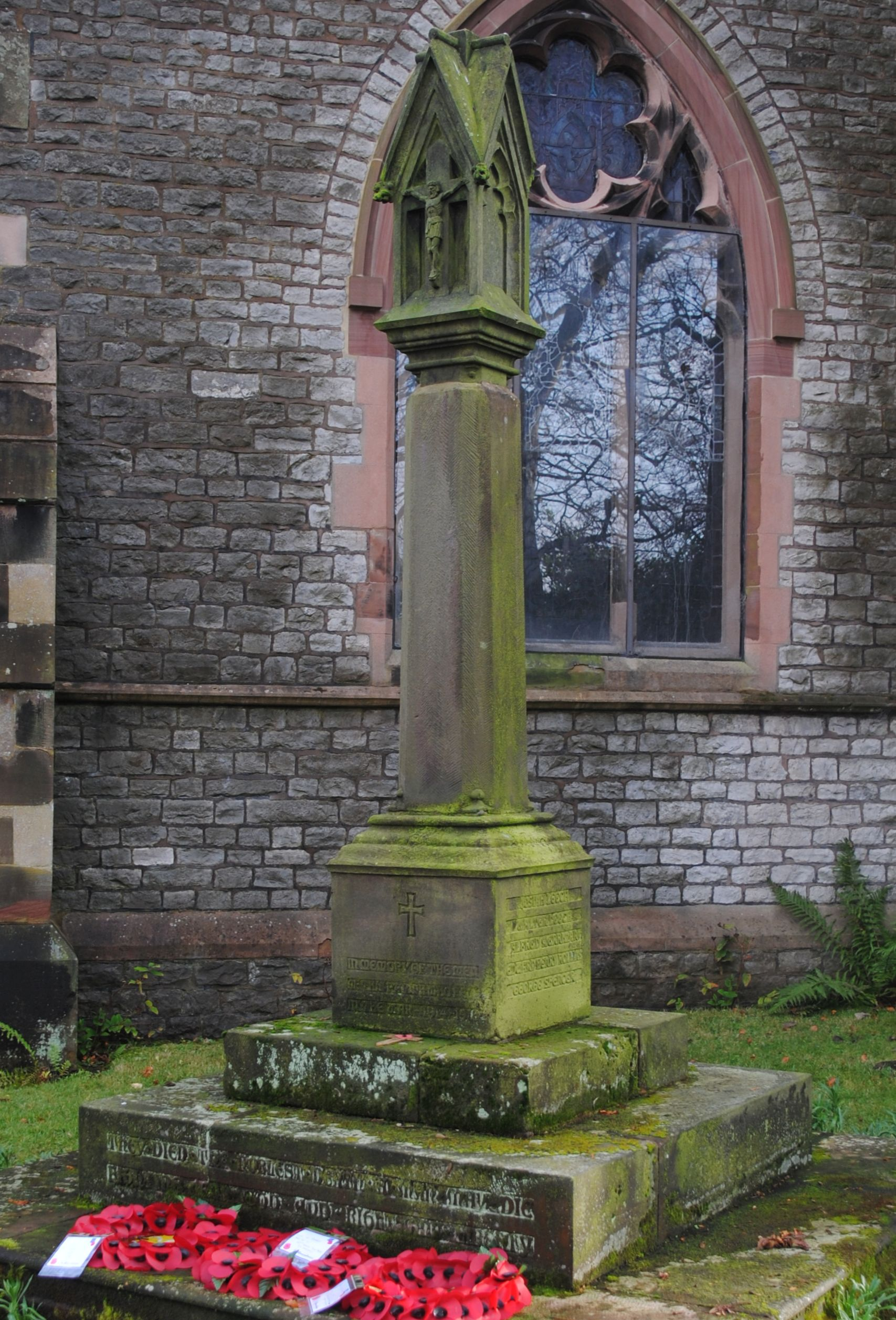
The war memorial cross in December 2016

The church was granted Grade II listed status in July 1986, legally protecting it from unauthorised alteration or demolition. Its war memorial, described by Historic England as "a lantern cross in the medieval style", was separately listed, also at Grade II, in April 2016.

As the church was historically in Staffordshire, its historic records are lodged with Staffordshire Record Office.

The church gives its name to the nearby St Margaret's Church of England Primary School, and to the former St Margaret's hospital in the adjacent grounds of Great Barr Hall.
