= Brian Sherratt (educator) =

Brian W. Sherratt OBE JP FIMgt FRSA
- Born: 28 May 1942 (age 84); Oxford, England
- Successor: Kate Abbott
- Spouse: Brenda Sherratt (born Hargreaves)
- Website: www.schoolleadershiplab.co.uk

Brian Sherratt is an English political science researcher with a particular interest in Whitehall bureaucracy and the role of the permanent secretary.

Formerly he was headmaster (1984–2005) of Great Barr School, a secondary school on Aldridge Road in Great Barr, Birmingham, England, for children aged 11 to 19. During his time as headmaster, Great Barr was the largest school in the UK.

== Work at Great Barr ==
Sherratt is said to have made Great Barr School one of the best in the country until his retirement from the school in August 2005.

Under Sherratt's leadership, Great Barr a school with very high standards of pupil behaviour and pupil achievement. For these reasons, the school was oversubscribed by parents on first choices. Visiting Great Barr School in November 1999, Sir Chris Woodhead, the then Chief Inspector of Schools, said "You have here an outstanding city comprehensive school – it is one of the most impressive schools I have visited. Great Barr School shows it is possible for a comprehensive school to give a very high quality of education". He added that "the secret of the school's success is strong, assertive leadership from the headteacher".

Sherratt was awarded the OBE for services to education in the 1995 New Years Honours.

== Earlier career ==
Earlier in his career Sherratt had worked in grammar and comprehensive schools and was a lecturer at Avery Hill College, now part of the University of Greenwich.

Before taking up the headship of Great Barr School in 1984, Sherratt was headmaster and warden (1979–1984) of Kirk Hallam School and Community Centre, (now Kirk Hallam Community Technology College), Ilkeston, Derbyshire. In February 1983 Kirk Hallam School underwent a full inspection by Her Majesty's Inspectorate, Department for Education and Science, Report by HM Inspectors on Kirk Hallam Comprehensive School, Ilkeston, Derbyshire, 7–11 February 1983, S910/4135/04 196/83 SZ 20/83. This was one of the first published inspection reports as introduced by Sir Keith Joseph during his time as Secretary of State for Education and Science. The inspection by a team of 19 HMIs was described by Sherratt as "the most penetrating and analytical in which I have ever been involved". In paragraph 18 of the published report HMI state that Kirk Hallam School "is to be commended upon its breadth of vision in the planning of its curriculum" (18.2, p 16). In paragraph 18.4, p 17 the report states that "The management of the school is outstandingly good". Publication of this report received wide coverage in the press including the Times Educational Supplement, the Ilkeston Advertiser and the Derby Evening Telegraph.

== Other interests ==
Sherratt had an interest in environmental issues and was a director of ENCAMS from 1998 to 2005 and vice-chairman of ENCAMS from 2003 to 2005. In addition he was chairman of the ENCAMS Devolution Committee (2004–2005). He was also a member of the ENCAMS Resources Committee (2002–2003), Audit Committee (2003–2005) and Trustee of the ENCAMS Pension Fund (1999–2005).

From 1997 to 2001 he was chairman of the Eco-Schools Advisory Panel and also Chairman of the Green Code for Schools Advisory Panel (1998–2005). In 1999 he received the Queen Mother's Birthday Award for the Environment.

Sherratt was respected as a scholar and in 2005 received the BELMAS (British Educational Leadership Management and Administration Society) Award for the Best PhD Thesis of the Year. In the same year he also received the George Cadbury Prize in Education from the University of Birmingham.

From 1986 to 1990 he was a member of the Court of the University of Birmingham and from 1988 an honorary lecturer in the School of Education. In 2002 he became an honorary lecturer at the University of Bristol and a visiting lecturer at the University of Asmara, Eritrea, where, with Dr Teame Mebrahtu, he led a programme of professional development for secondary heads throughout the country funded by the Danish aide programme, Danida.

From 2003 to 2005 he was a member of the Education Commission.

In 2012 he received the Freedom of the City of London. In 2003 he was elected a Freeman of the Guild of Educators and thereafter (2012) a Liveryman.

== School Leadership Lab ==
The School Leadership Lab was an on-line resource "for school leaders, for those interested in becoming school leaders, for governors, teachers and for those with a general interest in schools and education". It was set up in 2012 by Brian Sherratt and edited by him until 2015.

The School Leadership Lab covered a wide range of topics relating to school leadership and governance. The website contained factual information, opinion and advice. Further features included an RSS news feed ticker which displayed headlines relating to education and a news section where comments were posted relating to current developments in education.

School Leadership Lab was relevant to the leadership of both state and independent schools.

== Published work ==
- Local Education Authorities Project [LEAP 2] (BBC 1988) The Locally Managed School (with Hywell Thomas). This BBC training programme was designed to support governors, school heads and senior staff in training associated with the introduction of local management of schools following the implementation of the Education Reform Act 1988.
- 'Opting for Freedom: a stronger policy on grant-maintained schools', Policy Study No 138, Centre for Policy Studies, 1994.
- Grant-Maintained Status: considering the options, Longman, 1994. In this book Sherratt examines the nature of the grant-maintained policy and its implementation; the implications of self-government and the benefits of grant-maintained status; the role of the Funding Agency for Schools and the Common Funding Formula. The book also looks at the obstacles that there had been to implementing the policy and suggests some necessary changes to overcome them.
- A Structured Approach to School and Staff Development: from theory to practice (1996) – with John Wyatt. This book considers the relationships between school aims and values, whole school review, appraisal, school development planning, value for money in school planning and school evaluation.
- Headteacher Appraisal (contrib, Arena, in association with the NAHT, 1997). In this book, Sherratt writes about his experience of being appraised as the head of a large secondary school.
- Radical Educational Policies and Secretaries of State (with Peter Ribbins, Cassell 1997).
- Policy, Leadership and Professional Knowledge in Education (contrib, Chapman, BEMAS, 1999).
- Journal of Education Policy, The role of the Chancellor of the Exchequer in the making of educational policy: Kenneth Baker and the Lawson factor? Volume 19, No 6, November 2004 (with Peter Ribbins).
- 'Managing the Secondary School in the 1990s: A New View of Headship' with Peter Ribbins, Educational Management and Administration.
- Education Administration Management & Leadership (EMAL) special celebratory edition, 40(5) 544 – 55 (2012) (with Peter Ribbins). 'Permanent Secretaries, consensus and centrism in national policy making in education'
- Journal of Education and History, Volume 45, Issue 1, 28–48 (2013) (with Peter Ribbins) 'The permanent secretary as policy-maker, shaper, taker, sharer, and resister in education – reflections on Sir James Hamilton as a centralising outsider'
- International Studies in Educational Administration, Volume 41, No, 105–122 (2013) (with Peter Ribbins) 'Leading Education in the United Kingdom: a study of the policy and personal relationship of selected permanent secretaries and their Secretaries of State'.
- Public Policy and Administration (June 2014) (with Peter Ribbins) 'Reforming the Civil Service and revising the role of the mandarin in Britain: A view from the perspective of a study of eight permanent secretaries at the Ministry of Education between 1976 and 2011'.

== Current positions ==
From 2006 to 2012 Sherratt was a magistrate on the Nottingham Bench (Adult Court and Youth Court) and from 2009 to 2012 a Magistrate Training Observer. Since 2005 he has been a member of the Academic Advisory Council of the University of Buckingham. From 2005 to 2011 he was a director of Nottingham Park Estate Ltd(a company limited by guarantee) and from 2008 to 2011 its chairman.

== Personal ==
Sherratt was born in Oxford on 28 May 1942. In August 1966 he married (Pauline) Brenda Hargreaves from Leeds. They have two sons and two daughters. Apart from his continuing studies in the field of political science, he has a particular interest in the music of Richard Wagner. Education: University of Leeds (BA, PGCE); University of London (AcDipEd, MA); University of Birmingham (PhD).
