= Two Saints Way =

92-mile footpath in north-west England

The Two Saints Way is a recreated pilgrimage route of 92 miles between the cathedral cities of Chester in Cheshire and Lichfield in Staffordshire. The two saints referenced are St Werburgh and St Chad. The route partly follows the Heart of England Way and is around 95% waymarked.

== History ==
The inaugural pilgrimage took place in March 2012.

== Route ==
=== Chester to Nantwich ===
Starting at Chester Cathedral and passing by the Roman amphitheatre and the pilgrim church of St John's, the route predominantly follows the Shropshire Union Canal with diversions to Christleton, Beeston Castle, Bunbury village and St Mary's Church in Acton, and is relatively flat. This section ends at St Mary's Church in the market town of Nantwich.

=== Nantwich to Stoke-on-Trent ===
Farmland predominates in this section and the route becomes hillier. The route passes the Englesea Brook Chapel and Museum of Primitive Methodism and the village of Barthomley before reaching Stoke-on-Trent. The halfway point of the trail is Stoke Minster, which has a Saxon preaching cross.

=== Stoke-on-Trent to Stafford ===
The route follows the Trent Valley along sections of the Trent and Mersey Canal and remnants of the Staffordshire New Forest at Trentham and Tittensor Chase. It passes through the market town of Stone and the village of Burston to Salt, where it turns south west over Hopton Heath and Beacon Hill to reach St Chad's, the oldest church in the county town of Stafford.

=== Stafford to Lichfield ===
The route follows the River Sow out of Stafford and then joins the Heart of England Way at Milford to cross Cannock Chase, an Area of Outstanding Natural Beauty. The route passes the Katyn Memorial, the Cannock Chase Visitor Centre and Castle Ring hill fort. The route then runs through farmland, passing the Cross in Hand Lane, to reach Lichfield and the pilgrim sites at the cathedral and St Chad's Well.

== See also ==
- List of recreational walks in Cheshire
