= Fortis Academy =

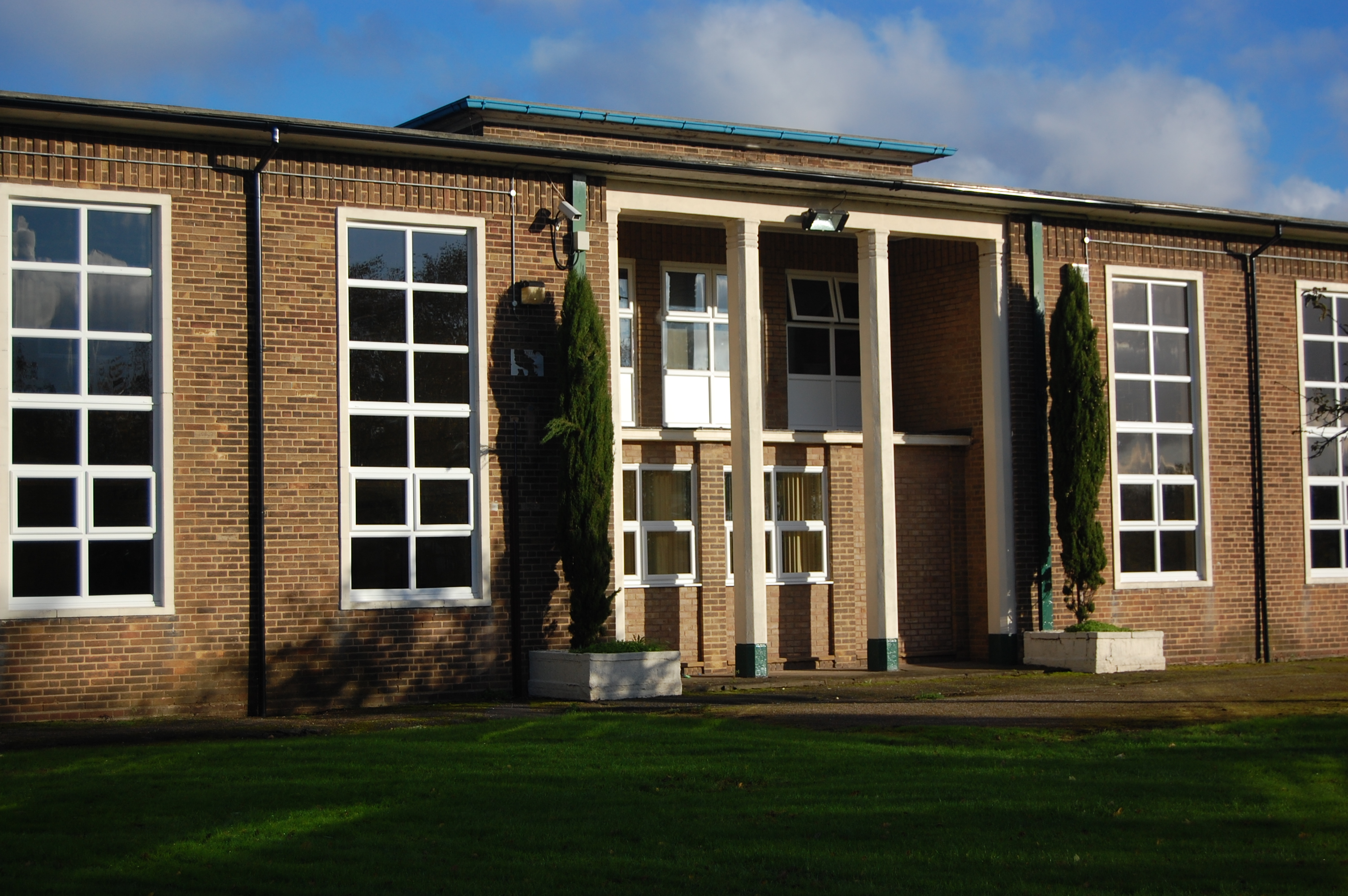

Location
- Aldridge Road; Birmingham, West Midlands, B44 8NU; England; 52.546263°N 1.902137°W

Information
- Type: Academy
- Motto: Enriching Lives
- Local authority: Birmingham City Council
- Trust: Shaw Education Trust
- Department for Education URN: 143435 Tables
- Ofsted: Reports
- Executive Headteacher: Sarah Murcott
- Gender: Co-educational
- Age: 11 to 18
- Enrolment: 1362
- Houses: Dudley, Kenilworth, Ludlow, Warwick
- Website: https://fortisacademy.org.uk

Fortis Academy is a co-educational secondary school and sixth form located in the Great Barr area of Birmingham, England.

== History ==
The school was officially opened by D. Rogers on 24 September 1957 as Great Barr Comprehensive School. The school had opened in September 1955 with thirteen forms of 11-year-old boys and girls and 615 pupils between the ages of 12 and 15, who were transferred from the Aldridge Road Boys and Girls Modern Schools which ceased to exist at that time. Oswald Beynon was the first headmaster.

The modern schools building had been incorporated into the comprehensive school and became the Lower School, with new buildings comprising the Middle and Upper Schools. The Lower school comprises the English and maths departments, with some science and technology rooms. The middle school is mainly made up of Technology rooms and the school's main library. The Upper School is primarily science, art, religious education, physical education and modern foreign languages.

In 2005, the school was designated as a specialist Science and Mathematics College. The school also gained a new specialist science building.

On 24 November 2005 the school's new music block was opened by then-headteacher, Brian Sherratt OBE. The date also marked the formal retirement of Sherratt after 21 years at the school.

Previously a foundation school administered by Birmingham City Council, in December 2016 Great Barr School converted to academy status and is now sponsored by the Shaw Education Trust. The school was later renamed Fortis Academy.

=== Artwork ===
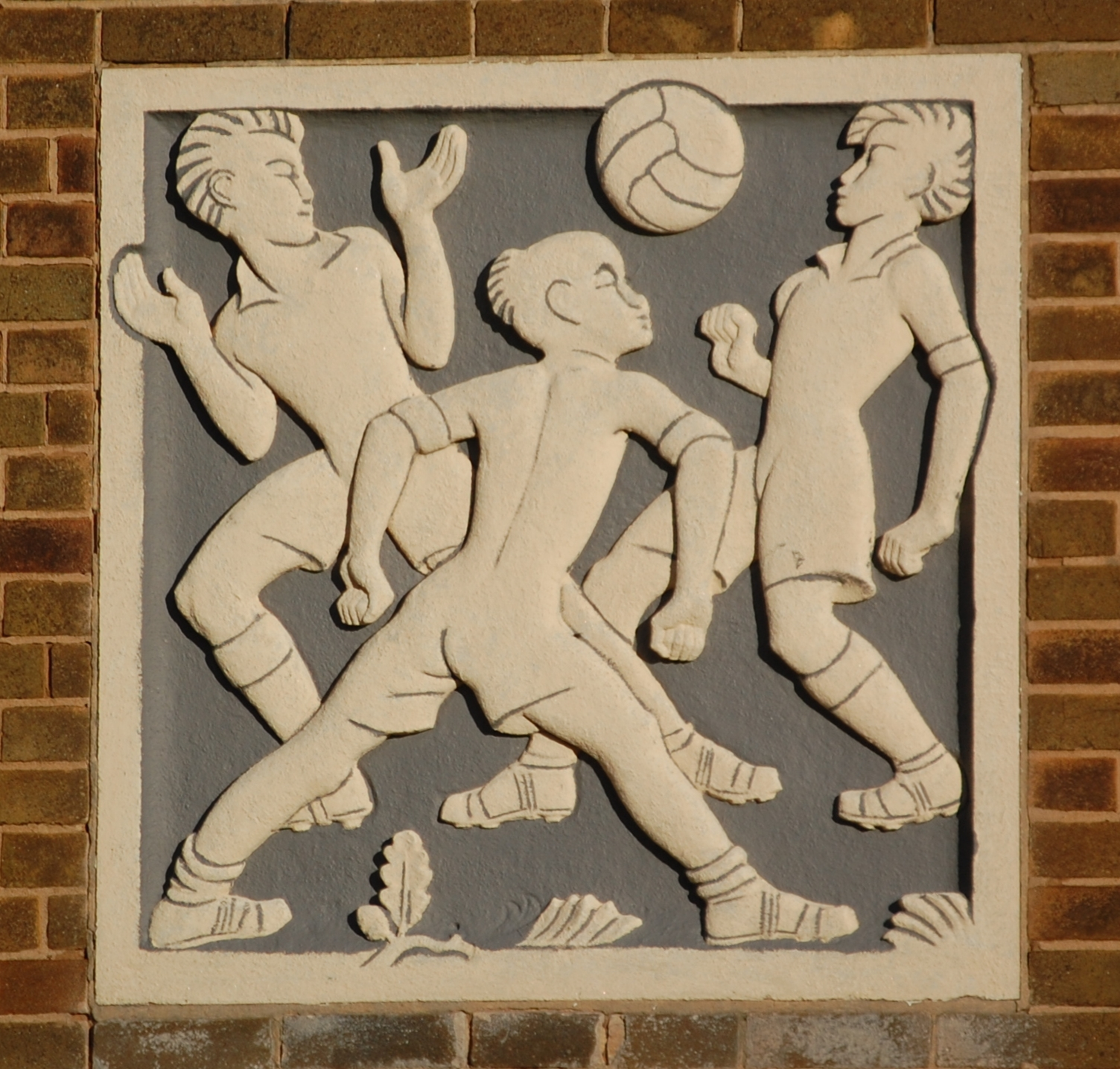
relief showing boys

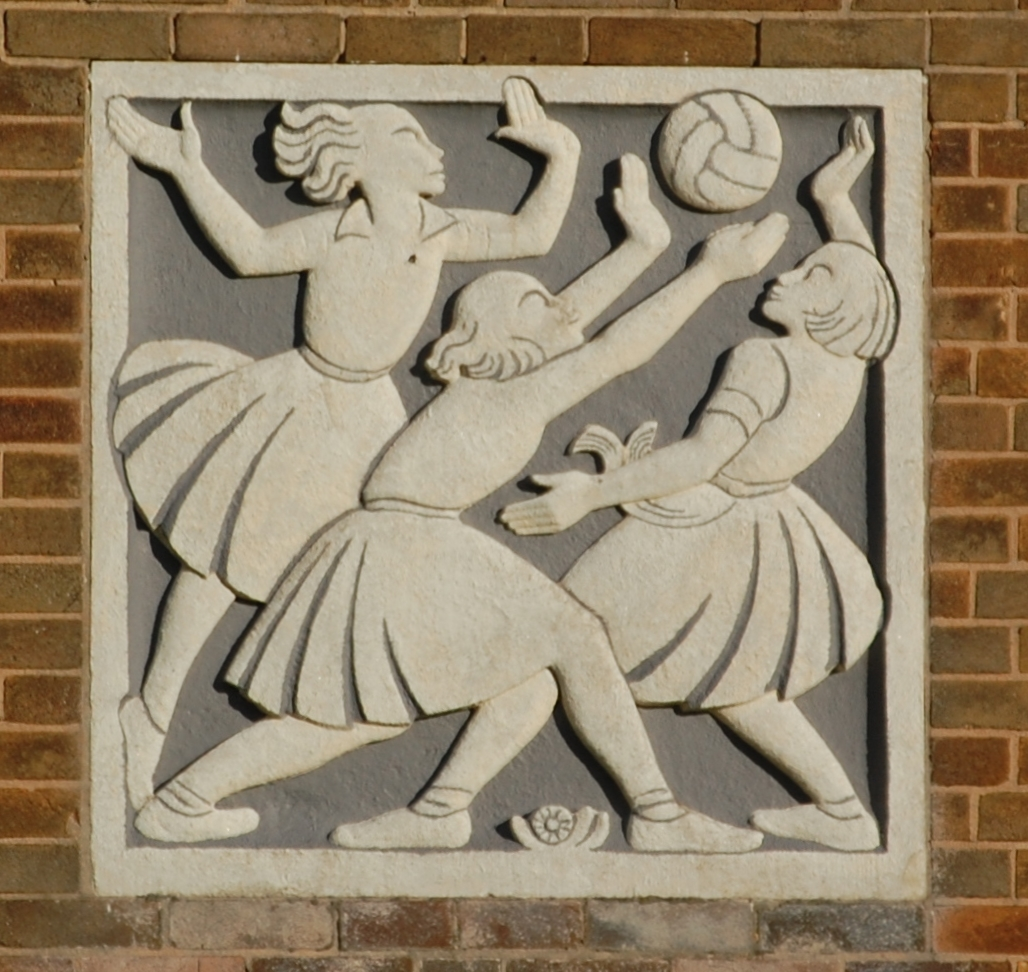
relief showing girls

The school's frontage features two carved reliefs, the left one showing three boys playing football; the right one three girls playing netball. Originally bare stone, these were painted circa 2013.

== Sixth Form Centre ==
Adjacent to the main school is the Sixth Form Centre. The sixth form centre acts as a college and form of higher education after leaving the last year, year 11. It provides its students with a two-year course, first contains AS level study and the second year contains A2 level. Most students choose to enter the Sixth form after their last year, as it provides many different courses including Media Studies, Business Studies, Further I.T, Higher Musical Courses, Higher Science, Law, Psychology and many others. The main focus of the Sixth Form Centre is the library called the O.L.C (Open Learning Centre), the centre also contains many class rooms and space for students to study. The centre also contains a specialist Law Room that is made to look like a 'mock-up' court.

The sixth form centre also offers post-16 vocational courses to pupils who wish to follow a vocational route to further education or training. As of 2011, these courses have included a Level 3 BTEC's in Forensic Science and Applied Biology and courses in iMedia and Sports Science.

== Notable former pupils ==
=== Great Barr Comprehensive ===
- Steve Adey, musician and singer-songwriter
- Ryan Cartwright, actor
- Daniel Ezra, actor
- Martin Shaw, actor
- Muff Winwood, musician and record producer
- Steve Winwood, vocalist and keyboardist

=== Aldridge Road Modern Schools ===
- Jeff Rooker, Baron Rooker, politician
- Dave Swarbrick, folk musician and singer-songwriter
