= Great Barr =

Coordinates: 52.548°N 1.932°W

Great Barr, Birmingham
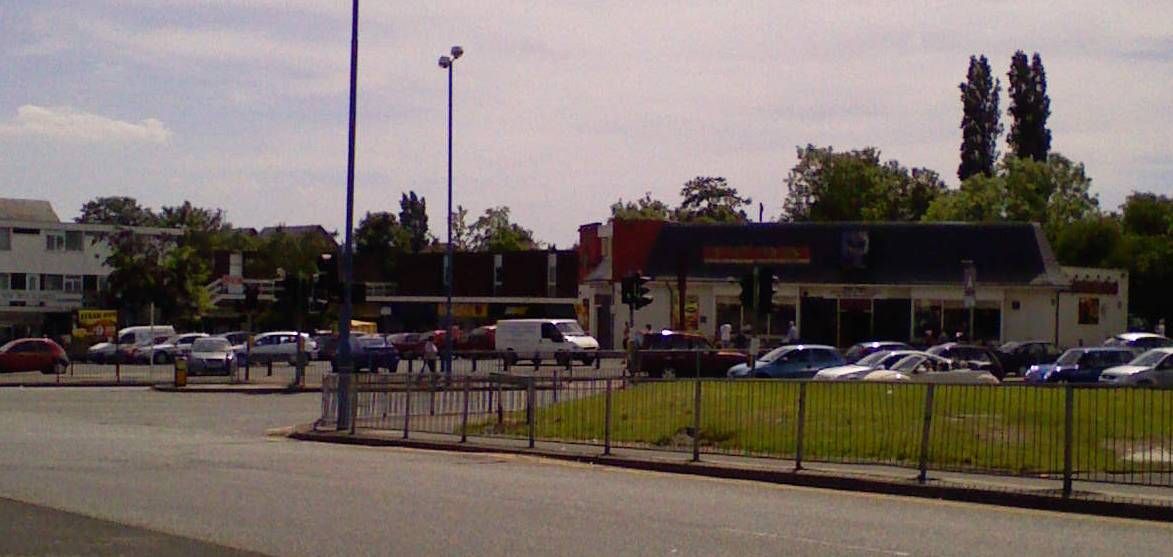
- The Scott Arms junction

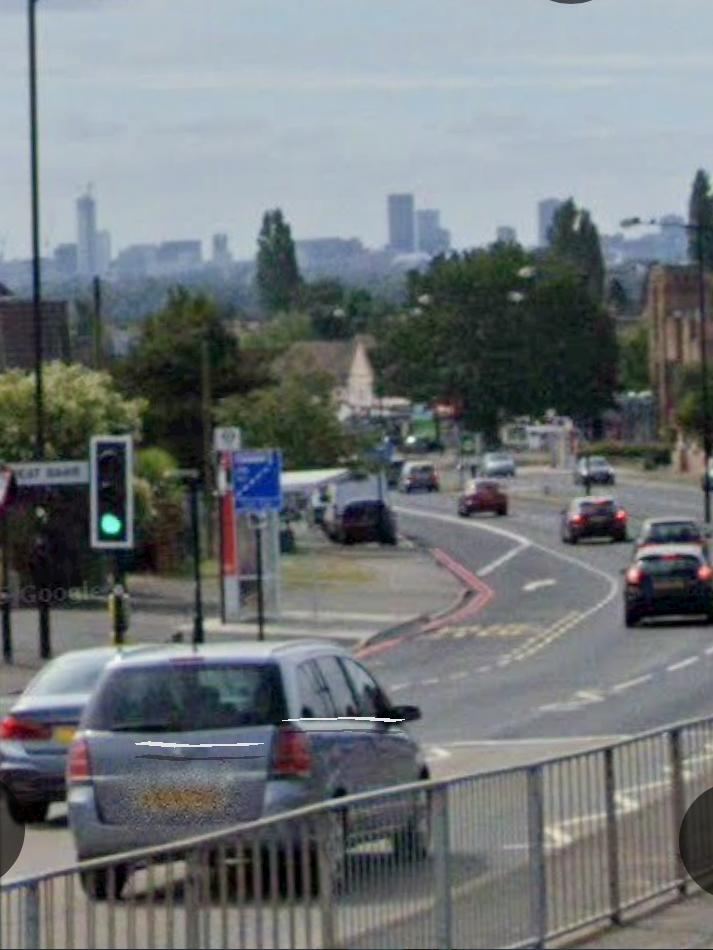
- View of central Birmingham taken from Great Barr

- Location within the United Kingdom
- OS grid reference: SP047945
- Metropolitan borough: Birmingham; Sandwell; Walsall
- Metropolitan county: West Midlands
- Country: England
- Sovereign state: United Kingdom
- Post town: BIRMINGHAM
- Postcode district: B42–B44
- Dialling code: 0121
- UK Parliament: West Bromwich, Perry Barr, Erdington, Walsall & Bloxwich

Great Barr is a large and loosely defined urban and suburban area to the north-west of Birmingham, in the county of the West Midlands, England. The area was historically in Staffordshire, and the parts now in Birmingham were once known as Perry Barr, which is still the name of an adjacent Birmingham district. Other parts still known as Great Barr are now in the Metropolitan Boroughs of Walsall and Sandwell.

"Barr" means "hill", and the name refers to nearby Barr Beacon. The name Barr Magna is used on some old maps.

== History ==
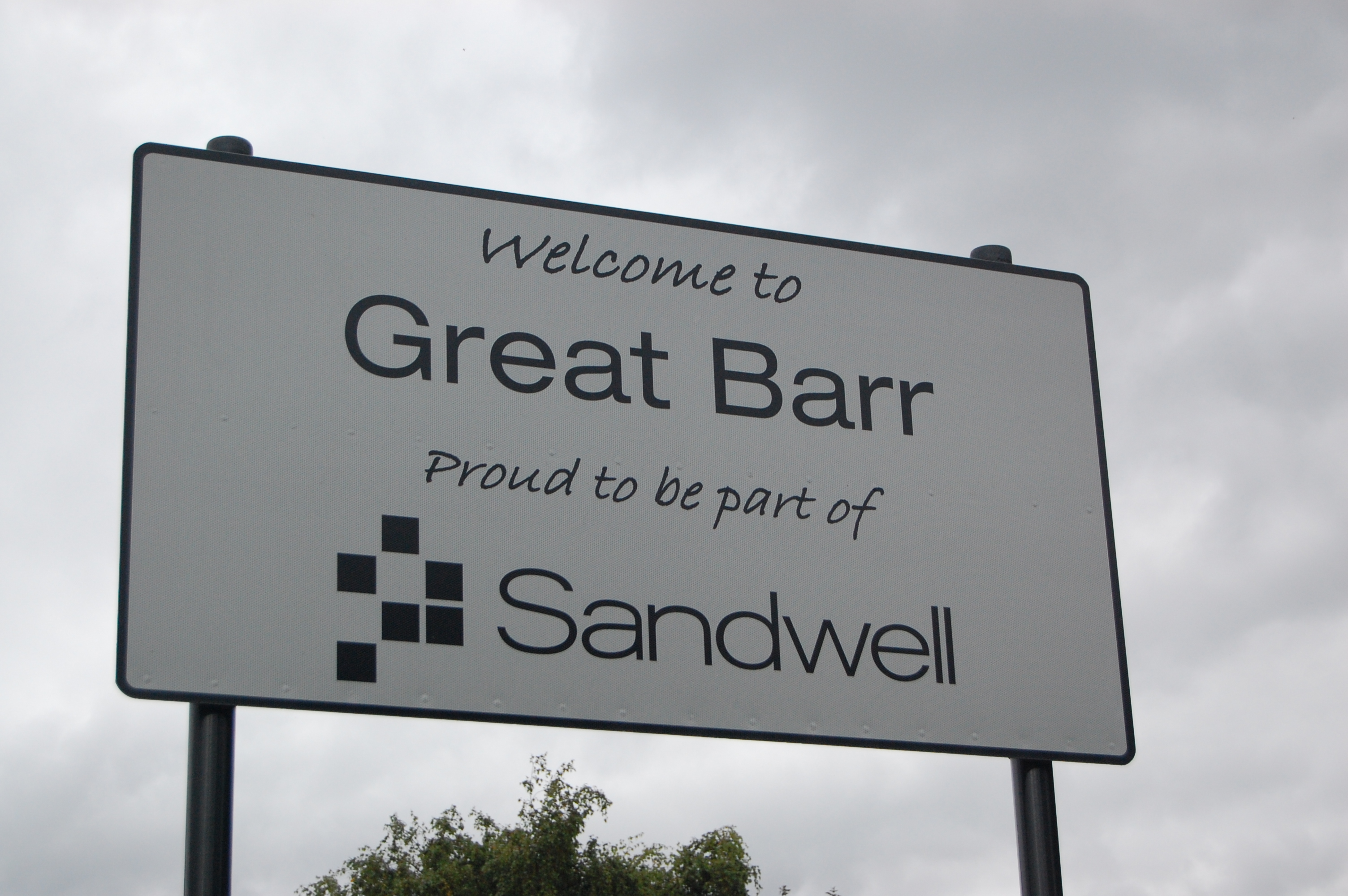
Sign erected by Sandwell Metropolitan Borough Council, in that part of Great Barr which lies in the borough

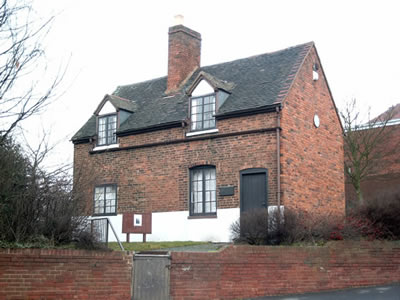
Francis Asbury's childhood home, now a museum in his memory

Great Barr was historically a township and chapelry in the parish of Aldridge, in Staffordshire. The chapel, now the site of St. Margaret's Church, is known to have existed by 1552, and its burial ground was consecrated in 1732.

Samuel Taylor, an itinerant Methodist preacher, visited Great Barr in 1792 and remarked "preached at Barr, a village famous for nothing as having given birth to Francis Asbury of America and being the present residence of his parents, at whose house we preached".

Great Barr was largely rural until the early 20th century, though it was influenced by the early stages of the industrial revolution which affected the nearby towns of Birmingham and the Black Country. The Staffordshire parish of Barr straddled the route from Birmingham to Walsall. Birmingham's historian William Hutton was surprised to see so many nail-making workshops in the area. He noted that "in some of these workshops I observed one, or more, females, stripped of their upper garments, and not overcharged with the lower, wielding the hammer with all the grace of their sex".

At that time the area was on the main drovers' routes which saw trains of horses taking coal from Walsall and Wednesbury to the factories and furnaces of Birmingham. At the Scott Arms there was a weekly cattle market which attracted large crowds. The Scott Arms and the Malt Shovel public house in Newton, did a roaring trade with drunkenness, cockfighting, and gambling common. Francis Asbury referred to it as "a dark place called Great Barre"

The rural economy was dominated by four great landowning families, the Wryley Birches, Dartmouths, Scotts and Goughs. The parish was series of tiny hamlets: Howell's Row, Sneal's Green, Newton, Margaret's Lane, Queslett, the Common, Bourn Pool, Bourn Vale, the Tamworth Road, the Gough Arms Inn (later called the Beacon Inn) and around Barr Hall. In 1817 there were 120 houses occupied by 127 families, 78 of whom were engaged in agriculture and 30 in trade. These trades included a tailor, boarding house owner, a wheelwright, a butcher, a grocer, who doubled as a constable, a shoemaker, two brick makers, a maltster, gun lock maker, three blacksmiths, and four spectacle frame makers.

In 1866 Great Barr became a separate civil parish, which in 1894 became part of Walsall Rural District. The 1901 census recorded a population of 1,344 and by 1921 this had increased to 2,232. A 1919 report on health and sanitation in Walsall Rural District describes the parish of Great Barr as extensive, almost entirely rural and having a scattered population, with the exception of residential Streetley.

By 1931 the population had grown to 3,294 and in that year Great Barr parish was reduced in size by transfers of land to West Bromwich, Walsall, and Sutton Coldfield parishes. In 1934 Walsall Rural District was abolished and Great Barr was transferred to Aldridge Urban District. By 1951 the population of Great Barr had reached 12,648. On 1 April 1966 Aldridge Urban District was abolished to form Aldridge Brownhills Urban District, part also went to West Bromwich. In 2015 the two local government wards in the Metropolitan Borough of Sandwell, which now cover much of Great Barr, had a combined electorate of 18,840 adults.

By the outbreak of the Second World War in 1939 it was a busy residential area with good road connections to West Bromwich, Walsall and Birmingham.

Expansion continued after the war, and during the 1960s the area received a motorway link when Junction 7 of the newly built M6 motorway was opened on the A34. It is also located close to the starting point of the M5, which can be accessed just one mile (1.6 km) northwards on the M6.

On 11 August 1975, eight-year-old local schoolgirl Helen Bailey was found dead from a single knife wound, in woods near Booths Farm. No one has ever been convicted for her death.

Kidnapper Michael Sams abducted estate agent Stephanie Slater from a house in Turnberry Road, Great Barr before holding her for eight days in January 1992. Following receipt of £175,000 ransom, Sams released her. Police arrested him three weeks later and he was sentenced to life imprisonment for abducting Slater and murdering Leeds prostitute Julie Dart.

== Geography ==
The modern centre of Great Barr is focussed on the busy junction of the A34 and A4041 roads, at the Scott Arms public house and shopping centre. This is named after the Scott family of Great Barr Hall, which was once home of Samuel Galton and a meeting place of the Lunar Society.

However, the name is also loosely applied to a swathe of the West Midlands bounded by junction 8 of the M6 motorway in the west, the Birmingham – Walsall railway line (part of the former Grand Junction Railway, opened in 1837, and including Hamstead railway station, formerly called Great Barr station) and Perry Barr to the south, Kingstanding to the east, and the open countryside of Barr Beacon to the north. Areas including Hamstead, Old Oscott, Perry Beeches, Pheasey, and Queslett may be considered as being within Great Barr.

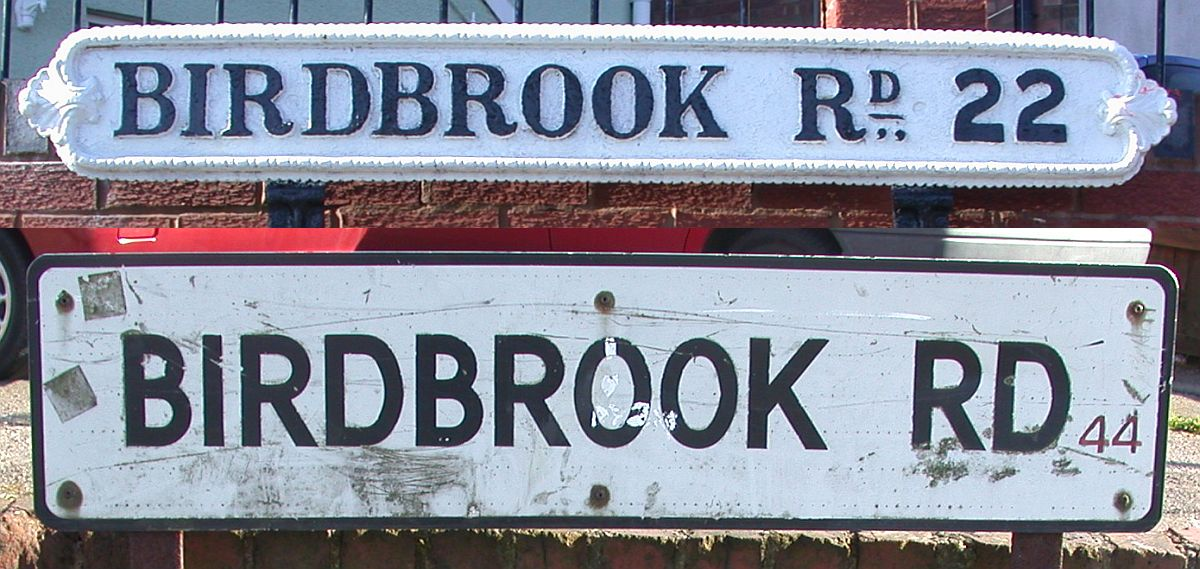
Street name signs on Birdbrook Road, Great Barr, Birmingham, showing old "Birmingham 22" (top) and modern "B44" postcodes.

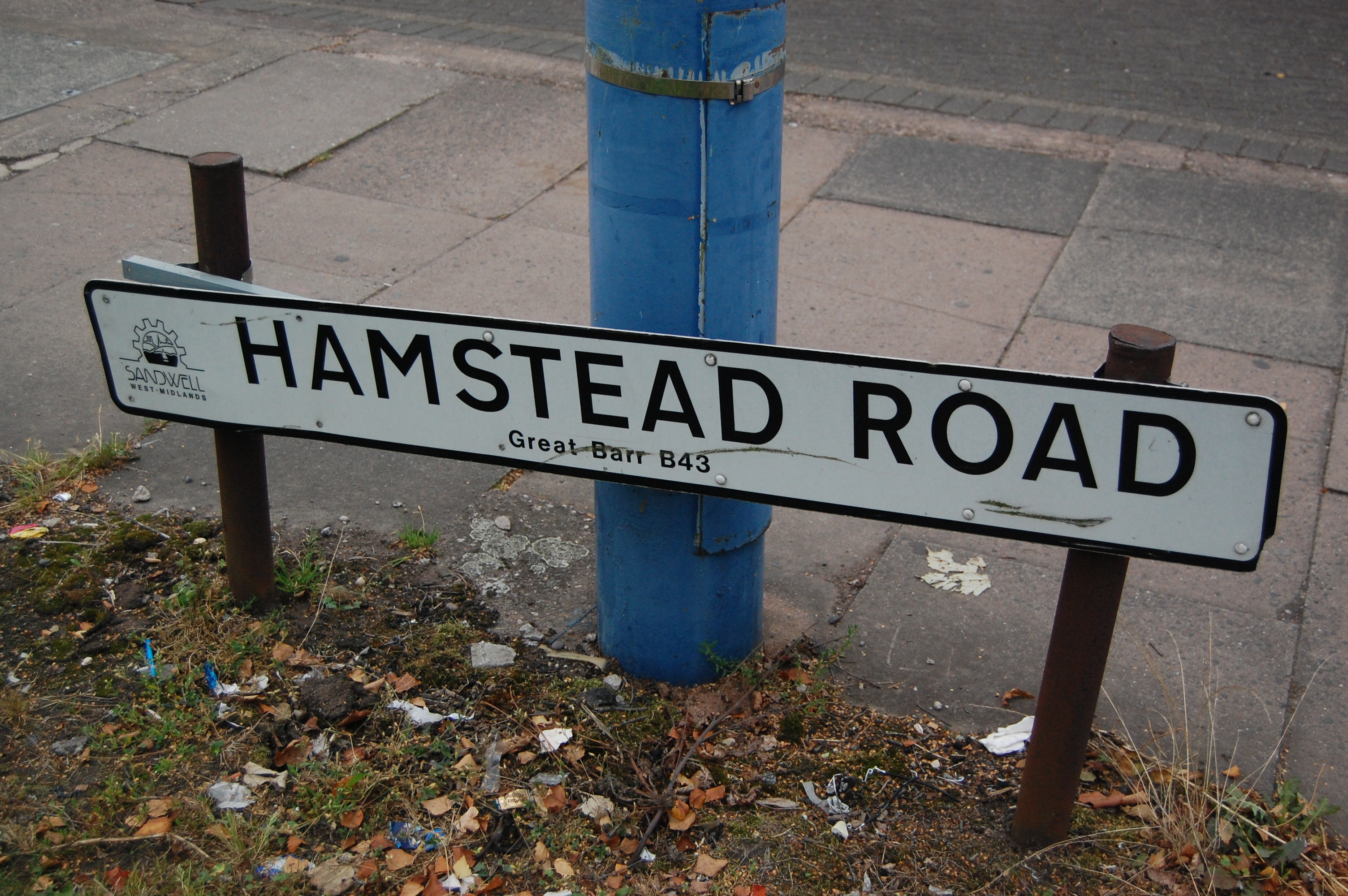
Street name sign on Hamstead Road, Great Barr, Birmingham, showing the "B43" postcode

Great Barr includes much of the B42, B43 and B44 postcode areas.

== Namesakes ==
Barr Limestone is a type of rock first identified in Great Barr. The specific name of the fossil trilobite species Bumastus barriensis, roughly meaning "of Barr", comes from its common name among collectors, the "Barr trilobite", referring to its plentiful occurrence in these formations, at Great Barr.

== Places of interest ==
Bishop Asbury Cottage (incorrectly named as "Bishop Ashbury's Cottage" on Ordnance Survey maps), was where Francis Asbury, the first American Methodist Bishop, was raised. It is owned by Sandwell Council and is Grade II listed. It is open by appointment for group visits, and opens occasionally to the general public.

Great Barr Hall is a Grade II* listed building, and due its current state of disrepair is not open to the public. St. Margaret's Church stands nearby.

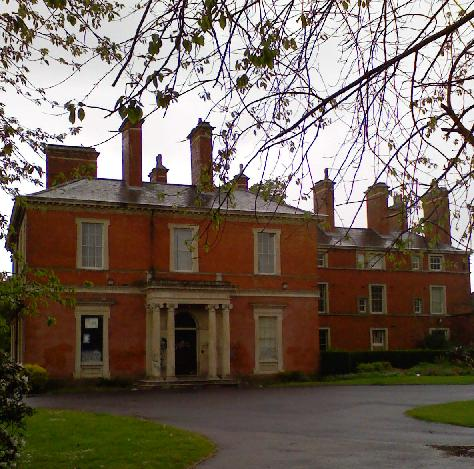
The Red House

Red House Park is open to the public and provides important amenities for the local community. It is owned by the Sandwell Council. In the grounds are both the Red House itself and an obelisk erected in memory of Princess Charlotte who died in childbirth in November 1817. The Red House, a country house also used a convalescent home, and then a community centre, is Grade II listed building, but is no longer open to the public, having been sold in 2015 and converted to residential apartments.

Birmingham Canal Navigations' Tame Valley Canal runs through Great Barr, from Piercy Aqueduct at Hamstead, along a cutting in 200-million year old sandstone, under Freeth bridge at Tower Hill, under the A34 and into Perry Barr Locks at Perry Barr.

== Residents ==
- Steve Adey – Musician was born in Great Barr and attended Great Barr School
- Francis Asbury (1745–1816) – one of the first two bishops of the Methodist Episcopal Church in the U.S.A.
- Helen Bailey, an eight-year-old schoolgirl who was killed in 1975
- John Bainbridge, – Writer, attended Hamstead Primary School, Grove Vale School and Dartmouth Comprehensive
- William Booth, – Forger. Booths Farm Road and Booths Lane are named after him.
- Arthur Browning moto cross/speedway rider
- Mike Burney, – Musician from Wizzard, attended at Hamstead Junior School and Churchfields Comprehensive
- James Michael Curtin, - professional wrestler better known as Rockstar Spud
- Cat Deeley, – TV presenter, actress and former model, attended Grove Vale Primary School and Dartmouth High School
- Mark "Barney" Greenway, – Singer of Napalm Death, born in Great Barr.
- Tim Iroegbunam, - footballer for Aston Villa and Everton
- Keith Law, – Songwriter for Velvett Fogg attended Hamstead Junior School and Churchfields High School Comprehensive
- Vaughan Lowe, – Lawyer and Oxford professor, attended Hamstead Primary School
- Geoff Morris, – professional football player for Walsall, Shrewsbury Town and Port Vale, was born in Great Barr
- Dhani Prem, – Padma Shri winner and the first Asian Councillor to represent Great Barr in 1946.
- Martin Shaw, – Actor, attended Great Barr School
- Dean Smith, Former Walsall football player and manager, former head coach of Aston Villa and Norwich City, born in Great Barr and attended Dartmouth High School.
- Jeff Smith, – motocross world champion 1964 & 1965, born in Colne, Lancashire
- Dave Swarbrick, – Musician, attended Great Barr School
- Steve Winwood, – Musician, attended Great Barr School, born in Handsworth
- Chris Woakes, – Cricketer for Warwickshire and England attended Barr Beacon School
- Gillian Wearing – Artist, Turner Prize Winner

== Education ==
Great Barr is well served with a number of primary and secondary schools. Great Barr School is the largest single-site school in the country with over 2,400 pupils on roll.

=== Primary schools ===
- Barr View Primary School
- Beeches Infant School
- Beeches Junior School
- Calshot Primary School
- Dorrington Road Primary school
- Ferndale Primary School
- Glenmead Primary School
- Greenholm Primary School
- Grove Vale Primary School
- Hamstead Infant School
- Hamstead Junior School
- Holy Name RC Primary School
- St Margarets CE Primary School
- St Mark's RC Primary School
- Whitecrest Primary School
- Meadow View Primary School
- Pheasey Park Farm Primary School

=== Secondary schools ===
- Fortis Academy is a mixed school catering for children aged 11 to 19.
- Arena Academy is a mixed academy catering for children aged 11 to 16.
- Q3 Academy Great Barr (formerly Dartmouth High School) is a mixed academy catering for children aged 11 to 19.
- Barr Beacon School is a mixed school catering for children aged 11 to 19.

Perry Beeches does not have a 'Primary' School it has two separate schools Beeches Infant School and Beeches Junior School.

The Perry Beeches Campus is the largest school campus in Birmingham and houses 5 schools: Perry Beeches Nursery School, Beeches Infant School, Beeches Junior School, Arena Academy and Priestley Smith School for the Visually Impaired.

=== College ===
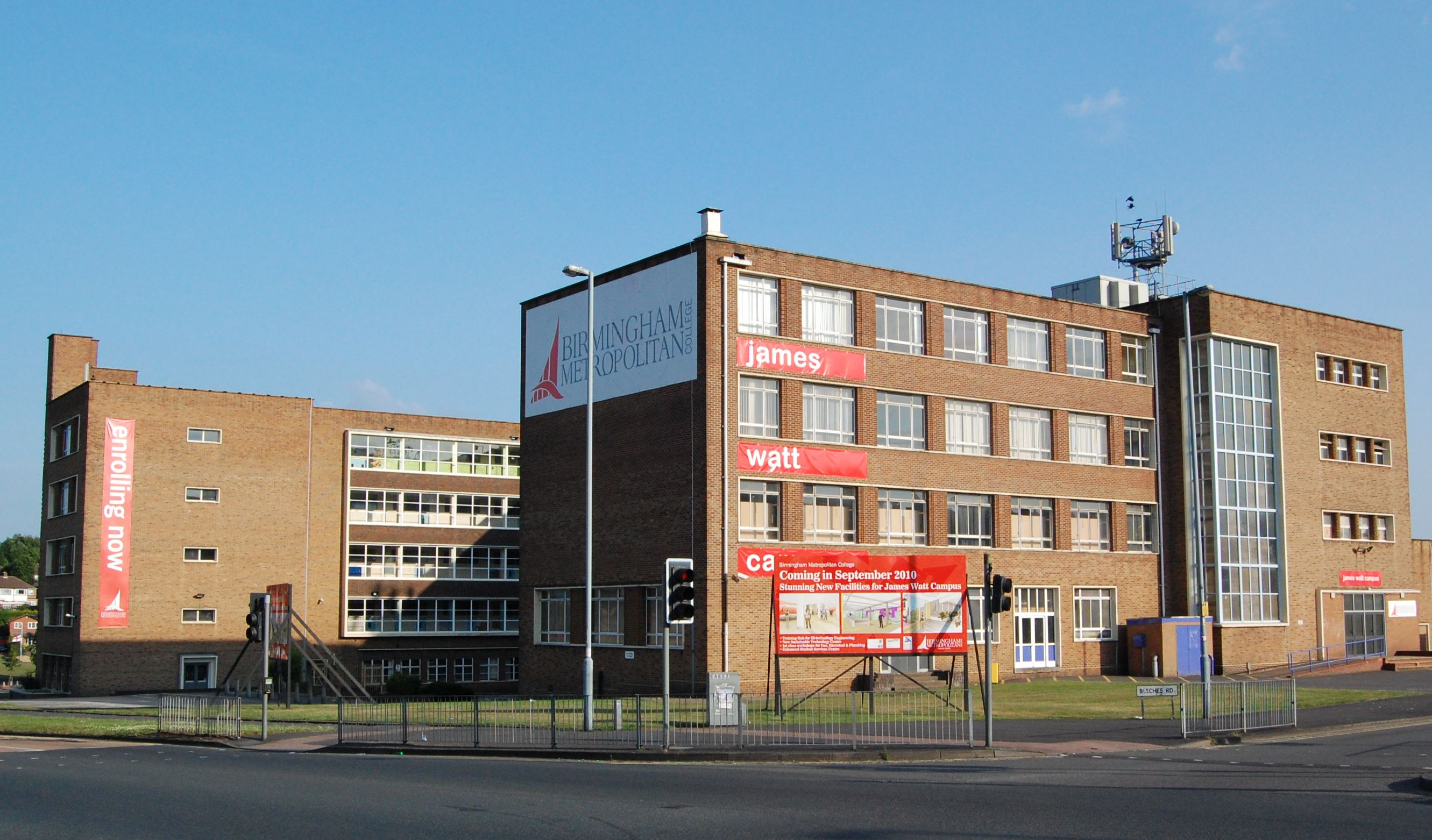
James Watt campus of Birmingham Metropolitan College in June 2010

The James Watt campus of Birmingham Metropolitan College is at the junction of Beeches Road and Aldridge Road, at the Old Oscott side of Great Barr. The buildings were originally Brooklyn Technical College.

== Bibliography ==
- Asbury, Francis, "The Journal and Letters of Francis Asbury" 1st edition 1821, republished Nashville and London, 1958
- Hackworth, F.W., "History of West Bromwich" 1895, republished Studley, 2001
- Hallam, David J.A. "Eliza Asbury: her cottage and her son" Studley, 2003 ISBN 1 85858 2350
- Hallam, David J.A. "One hundred years of service to Newton: The history of Newton Road United Reformed (Allen Memorial) Church 1917-2017" Smethwick, 2018 ISBN 978-1-9999387-0-3
- White, William, "The History, Gazetteer and Directory of Staffordshire", Sheffield, 1834
- Woodall, Richard, "The Barr Story", Aldridge, undated, (1950?)
