= Pheasey =

- Urban estate
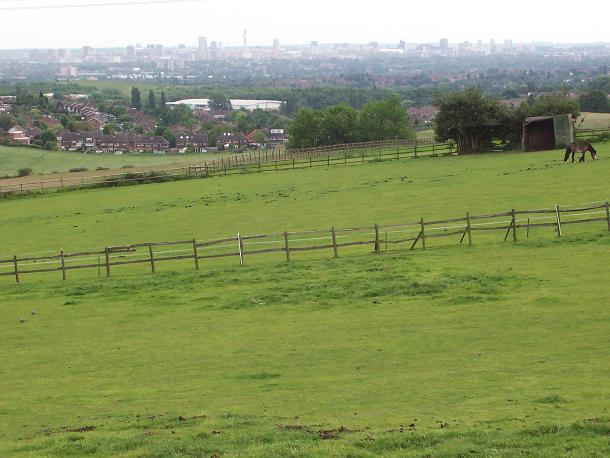
- Pheasey seen from Barr Beacon, with Birmingham in the background
- Etymology: Simon Veysie
- Interactive map of Pheasey
- Coordinates: 52.5605°N 1.9020°W
- Country: United Kingdom
- County: West Midlands
- Metropolitan Borough: Walsall

Pheasey is a residential area of Walsall Metropolitan Borough in the West Midlands of England, often considered to be part of Great Barr. The area was predominantly developed for housing, as the Pheasey Estate, in the 1930s, but work was not completed until after the Second World War. Barr Beacon, a hill, is a local landmark.

== Geography ==
Pheasey is situated in the east of the Metropolitan Borough of Walsall and is located adjacent to the Sutton Coldfield and Kingstanding districts of Birmingham. Being on the south-facing slopes of Barr Beacon, which separates the area from the rest of Walsall, the area is hilly.

== Government ==
Historically, Pheasey was in Staffordshire.

As a result of the Local Government Act 1894, from 1894 to 1966 it was part of Aldridge Urban District, and from 1966 to 1974, part of the merged Aldridge-Brownhills Urban District. Both these Urban Districts were in Staffordshire, and under the aegis of Staffordshire County Council, but in 1974 the area became part of Metropolitan Borough of Walsall, and the newly formed West Midlands county.

The local government ward for the area is 'Pheasey Park Farm'. Its population at the 2011 census was 11,010.

Pheasey is still considered to be in the Staffordshire vice-county for the purposes of biological recording.

== History ==
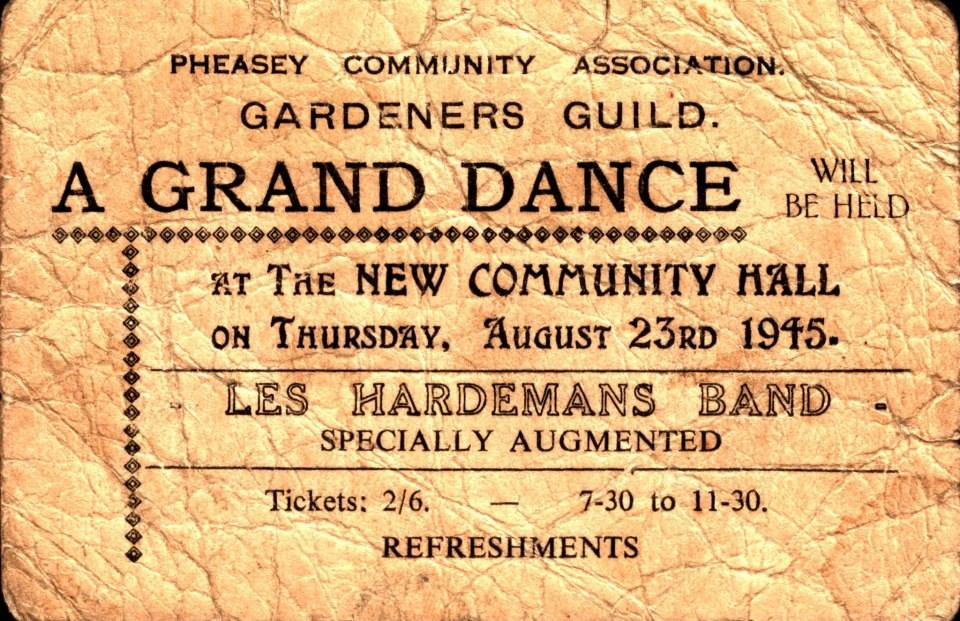
Ticket for "A Grand Dance" at the then-new Community Hall, 1945

Land on the southern side of Barr Beacon was known as Barr Lea. Record show that in 1559 one Simon Veysie purchased 162 acres, plus a house, garden and orchard, from A John Reddell, for £80. Over time, the name Veysie became corrupted to Pheasey.

In the 17th century, much of Barr Lea came into the ownership of the Scott family, whose house Great Barr Hall was later built nearby. The land was largely consolidated into two farms, Pheasey Farm and Park Farm. George Smith became the Scott's tenant at Pheasey Farm in 1902. In July 1921, the Scotts put the farm up for auction, but withdrew it and made a private sale to Smith. In 1935, he sold the land to the First National Housing Trust (FNHT), a subsidiary of Henry Boot & Sons Limited, of Sheffield, for development for housing. Boots asserted that they had evidence of demand from people in Birmingham for better housing, recording 90–100 requests per week. In total they acquired 303,203 acres at Pheasey, a small part of which was on the south side of Queslett Road, and thus in the City of Birmingham. Their proposal was to build 4,225 houses, at 12 houses per acre to be available for rent chiefly to working class people moving from slums in inner-city Birmingham There were also to be shops and other amenities. The request for planning permission was refused by Aldridge Urban District Council, who wanted no more than three to six houses per acre, with 150 acres reserved as open space. The refusal was overturned on appeal, but Boots agreed to sell 68 acres to Aldridge UDC to be kept as open space "in perpetuity".

A ceremonial "first sod" was cut on 13 July 1937, by Kingsley Wood, the then Minister of Health. The FNHT's published proposals for the estate included a public square, shops, cinema and public house at the junction of Wimperis Way and Romney way. These never materialised. Shops were built on Collingwood Drive. A planned community centre on Collingwood Drive eventually opened later, and as of 2018, still operates.

At the outbreak of the Second World War, in September 1939, around 1,700 houses were complete. During the Birmingham Blitz, demand for housing on the estate increased. Later in the war, some houses that were already constructed but not occupied were requisitioned by the War Office for use by American troops who were preparing for the relief of Europe. At the end of the war, the requisitioned houses, in a poor state of repair were sold off, to high demand.

Park Farm was sold for development in 1955.

In the early 1960s, the FNHT offered to sell houses to their tenants, and many converted their rents into mortgage payments with the Banner Building Society.

The estate is featured on one of the Silver Thread Tapestries.

== Facilities ==
The estate in 2017 includes two primary schools, a community centre, and library. These were all anticipated by the Trust's 1937 plan. Barr Beacon School, built to serve the estate, lies just across Beacon Road from it.

A former public house, The Trees, built with the estate, is now Buffet Island, a restaurant. Another The Old Horns, built in the 1960s on the site of one predating the estate, is extant.

Pheasey Evangelical Church, behind Buffet Island, was built by volunteer labour between 1954 and 1962, on a site once earmarked for the pub's tennis court and bowling green.

== Notable places and places of interest near Pheasey ==
- Barr Beacon (opened 1919)
- Doe Bank Park
- Barr Beacon Quarry (closed 1920s, now public area)
- Great Barr Hall (built 1777, abandoned 1978, to be renovated.)
- St Margarets Mental Hospital (opened 1918, closed in stages 1992–2004, mostly demolished 2008.)

== Public transport ==
The only public transport is operated by bus. These are operated by NXWM and Walsall Community Transport (service 25). Routes include:

- 5 West Bromwich – Sutton Coldfield
- 25 Bloxwich – Aldridge – Kingstanding
- 33 Birmingham – Pheasey
- 936 Walsall – Birmingham
- 997 Walsall – Birmingham
- 998 Streetly - Birmingham
