= John Bainbridge (author) =

British writer

- Born: 1953 (age 72–73); West Bromwich
- Education: Hamstead Primary School, Grove Vale School and Dartmouth Comprehensive; University of East Anglia
- Writing career
- Genre: Topography
- Website: johnbainbridge.com

John Bainbridge (born 1953) is an English author and campaigner for countryside preservation and access. He read Literature and Social History at the University of East Anglia.

== Biography ==
Born in West Bromwich, Staffordshire, Bainbridge spent his childhood at 15 Ray Hall Lane, Great Barr, and was educated at Hamstead Primary School, Grove Vale School, Dartmouth Comprehensive, and West Lawn School in Teignmouth. It was from there that he began exploring the British countryside, often taking walking tours that lasted for months at a time. He moved to Devon as a teenager and became very knowledgeable about Dartmoor.

Bainbridge was chief executive of the Dartmoor Preservation Association from 1996 to 2005, and led the victorious campaign to save the archaeologically important Shaugh Moor from waste tipping by the china clay industry. He led the campaign for right to roam in Devon, which culminated in the Countryside and Rights of Way Act. He has opposed the military presence on Dartmoor, for which he was praised by Anthony Steen MP in the House of Commons in 2003.

An unapologetic trespasser Bainbridge remains a steadfast campaigner for countryside access. He has dealt with the matter of trespassing in his controversial book "The Compleat Trespasser" (2013) and more briefly in his book on walking "Rambling - some thoughts on country walking". He has also written an eBook about the Victorian writer George Borrow.

He is the author of a walking autobiography "Wayfarer's Dole" and a book about land access 'Free Roaming - The Compleat Trespasser'.

In 2012, he was given an award by the Ramblers Association to mark a 40-year contribution to the outdoors movement.

As a writer he has contributed to most outdoor magazines and is the author of some thirty books about British topography, including Dorset Coast, South Devon Coast and Newton Abbot, Around Torbay, The Cotswolds, Worcestershire.

In 2009, Bainbridge created the Teignmouth and Dawlish Way long distance footpath, writing the guidebook of the same name, and was involved in the creation of The Two Moors Way long-distance trail.

Having retired from active campaigning, Bainbridge has found time to publish several thriller novels including "The Shadow Of William Quest", "Deadly Quest" "Dark Shadow" and 'The Newgate Shadow' which have been well received.

He has written a straight thriller "Balmoral Kill" - a set in 1937 and based on the involvement of the Establishment in appeasing Hitler, and a sequel "Dangerous Game".

Bainbridge has also written four novels based on the old ballads of Robin Hood: "Loxley", "Wolfshead" and "Villain" and "Legend" as part of a tetralogy of historical fiction entitled "The Chronicles of Robin Hood".

He was in 2020 chosen by the writer Roly Smith as one out of twenty individuals who had done the most to influence the Right to Roam campaign in the UK
