= Barr Beacon School =

Location
- Old Hall Lane; Walsall, West Midlands, WS9 0RF; England; 52.561109°N 1.914953°W

Information
- Former name: Barr Beacon Language College
- Type: Academy
- Motto: 'Proud to Succeed'
- Established: 1954
- Local authority: Walsall
- Specialist: School
- Department for Education URN: 136885 Tables
- Ofsted: Reports
- Chair: D Park
- Headteacher: Kate Hibbs
- Staff: 100+
- Gender: Coeducational
- Age: 11 to 18
- Enrolment: 1,556
- Houses: Malvern, Wrekin, Clent, Bredon, Kinver
- Colours: Gold, blue, green, red and purple
- Website: www.barrbeaconschool.co.uk

Barr Beacon School, formerly Barr Beacon Language College, is a mixed secondary school in Walsall, England, which acquired Academy status in 2011, when it readopted the school's original name: Barr Beacon School. It takes this name from the adjacent hill, Barr Beacon. The school was designated a specialist Language College in September 2003 but does not have this designation today. It has over 1500 pupils, including a sixth form of approximately 200.

== History ==
The school was built to serve the adjacent Pheasey Estate, and opened in 1958 under the same headmastership as Aldridge Grammar School. In 1960 it had its own headmaster, Tyas, as an 11-15 plus 1 year GCE O Level secondary modern school for 300 pupils before converting to a 13-18 comprehensive in September 1972 under the reorganisation of schools in Aldridge-Brownhills, the urban district that was absorbed into the Metropolitan Borough of Walsall in 1974. However, it was reorganised into an 11-18 school in September 1986, and has retained that age range ever since.

=== 1983 arson attack ===
An arson attack took place at the school on the morning of 5 June 1983. 70 firefighters used water from the school swimming pool to extinguish the fire, which destroyed ten classrooms and caused £500,000 worth of damage. The headmaster was David Lobley.

== Construction ==
The building was initially planned and constructed by Ian Woodley Associates with surveying and mapping of the area completed by P. O'Connor and sons. Actual construction beginning in March 1951. Actual construction was completed by an amalgamation of Ian Woodley Associates, Gaz Baldwyn-Jolly plastering limited and Whalley Forklift rentals. The first building (currently A block) was completed before schedule in late 1952 and the final block originally planned (currently D block) being completed on time in 1958 ready for teaching in the same year. Once the first canteen (located in A block) was built the kitchen was furnished by N. Burnett & Co. catering suppliers to provide food for staff and students at the school.

== School performance ==
The school was judged Outstanding in its Ofsted inspection of 2014. As of 2023, its most recent inspection was in November 2022, with an outcome of Good.
