= Great Barr Hall =

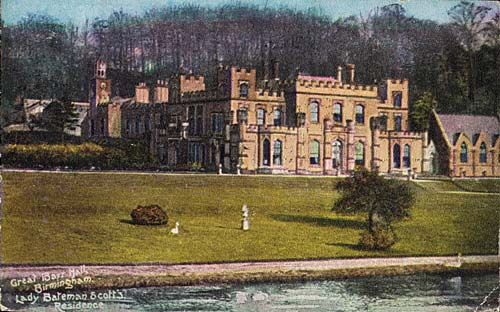
- 1907 postcard
- Former names: Barr Hall

General information
- Status: Derelict, at risk
- Type: Mansion
- Architectural style: Strawberry Hill gothic
- Location: Pheasey, Walsall, England
- Coordinates: 52.556283°N 1.920961°W
- Construction started: 18th century
- Client: Joseph Scott
- Owner: Local consortium

Design and construction
- Designations: Grade II listed

Great Barr Hall, originally Barr Hall, is an 18th-century mansion situated in the Great Barr district of Pheasey, historically in Staffordshire and now part of Walsall, West Midlands, England. It has associations with the Lunar Society and is a Grade II listed building. It is, however, in a very poor state of repair and is on the Buildings at Risk Register.

== History ==
=== The Scotts ===
Barr Hall (later Great Barr Hall), as built, engraving by Thomas Radclyffe, after Frederick Calvert (c.1785 - c.1845), from the latter's work "Picturesque Views in Staffordshire and Shropshire" (1830)

In the mid-17th century, Richard Scott acquired the house then standing on the site and known as Nether House. In about 1777, Joseph Scott (later Sir Joseph Scott, 1st Baronet Scott of Great Barr) replaced the old house with a two-storey, nine-bay mansion in the Strawberry Hill Gothic Revival style. The house was much altered and extended about 1840 and in 1863, an adjacent chapel (which was never consecrated) was erected to a design probably of architect George Gilbert Scott, a friend – but not a relation – of Sir Francis Scott. Two of the extant lodge houses are believed to be by George Gilbert Scott.

The chapel had windows by William Raphael Eginton. Circa 1816, he described them thus:

6 Windows containing Figures, the size of life, of Hope, Temperance, Justice, Fortitude, Prudence, and Charity, after Sir Joshua Reynolds

Outside the chapel are the burial plots of several of Lady Bateman Scott's pets, inscribed with poems she wrote for them.

Financial problems led the Scott Family (who gave their name to the nearby Scott Arms pub and shopping centre), to lease out the hall from about 1788 to Samuel Galton, and for some years the Hall became a venue for meetings of the Lunar Society. It is said to be the 'favourite place of meeting' of this illustrious body. In 1999, stone memorials to the Lunar Society, the "Moonstones", were erected at the nearby Asda supermarket.

In 1791, Sir Francis Scott, 3rd Baronet, inherited the manor of Great Barr from his maternal uncle Thomas Hoo and was able to return to live in the house on the expiry of the lease. He died in 1863. His widow Mildred lived on in the Hall until her death in 1909.

=== After the Scotts ===
In 1911, the estate was sold and, in 1918, became The Great Barr Park Colony for "mental defectives". In 1948 it became St Margaret's Mental Hospital (named for the nearby St Margaret's Church). Many detached hospital buildings were erected near the hall, but the hall itself was abandoned in 1978 and, despite its 1971 Grade II listing, was left to decay.

In the 1980s the grounds became a nature reserve, managed by the Staffordshire Nature Conservation Trust

The hospital began to close in phases from the late 1980s. This also included a special school, The Queslett School, which closed in December 1988. The hospial's male department closed during 1992 and the female department closed in March 1997. The final residents, those with high dependency, left a newer part of the site in 2004.

=== 21st century ===
The hall and chapel, both in derelict state, were used in filming the third episode of season 7 of Dalziel and Pascoe, first screened in October 2002.

Many years passed during which discussions and negotiations for the protection of the hall came to nothing. In 2006, Bovis Homes purchased the 40 hectare estate and obtained planning permission for the redevelopment of the site. Nether Hall Park, a new residential housing development occupying a substantial part of the estate, was completed in the 2010s.

In May 2011 the hall, still in ruins, was put up for sale for £2.2 million, by the Manor Building Preservation Trust, who had been allowed to purchase it nine years earlier for £900,000. The trust had failed to bring it back into a safe state. It failed to sell, and so was offered for sale by auction on 6 February 2012, by Van Weenan Estate Agents of London, with a guide price of £1,250,000. The highest bid was £1,140,000, and so it again remained unsold. In May 2012, it was sold to a consortium of ten local residents, who commissioned Lapworth Architects to consult with the public and investigate potential new uses for the hall. A planing application to build 57 dwellings some as large as 10,000 square feet (930 m^{2}), was refused on 17 February 2022.

In February 2026, the hall, with 153.8 acres (62.2 ha) of land, was again offered for sale, with a guide price of £7 million.

The hall is on English Heritage's "Buildings at Risk Register".

== Lodges ==
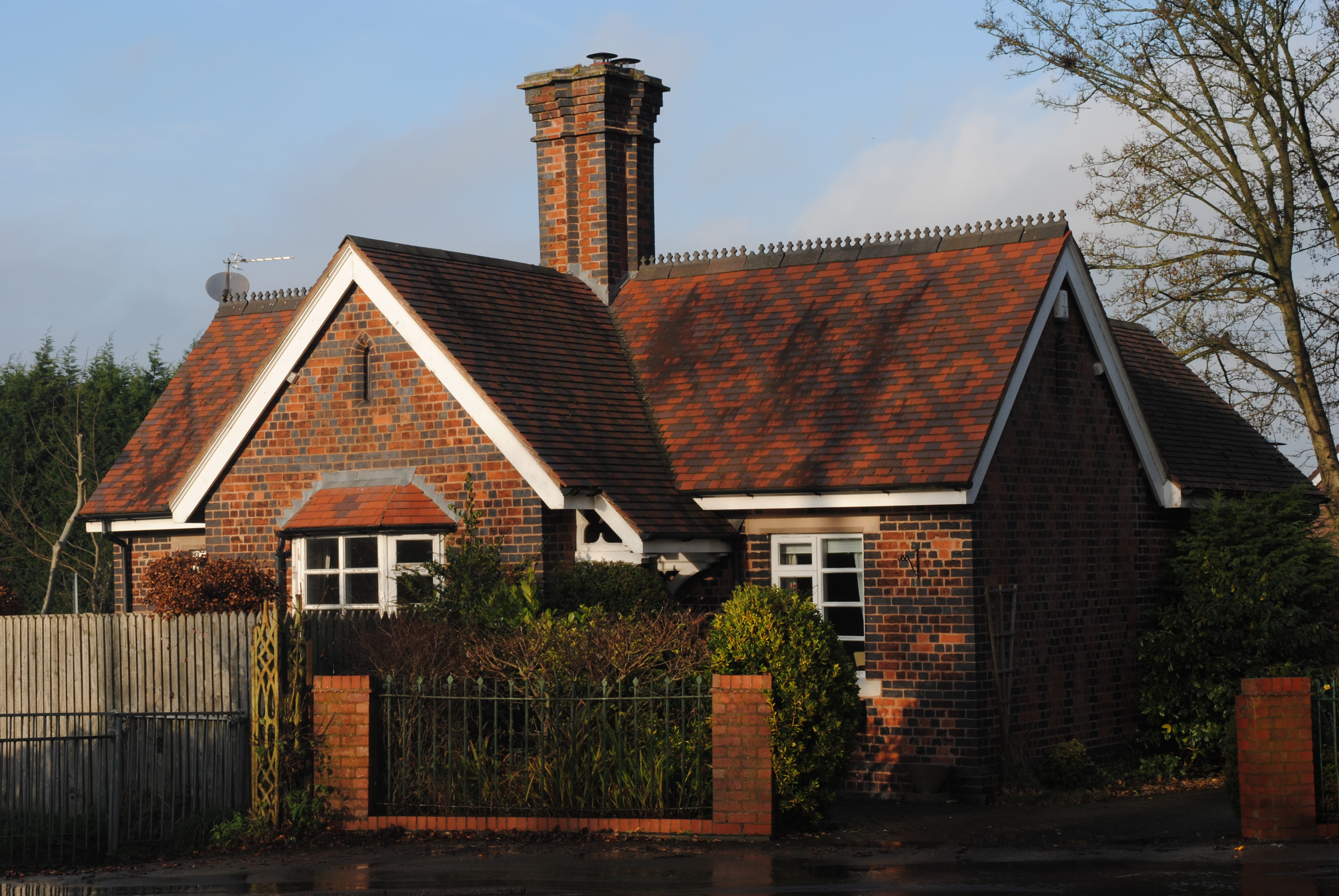
Avenue Lodge in December 2016

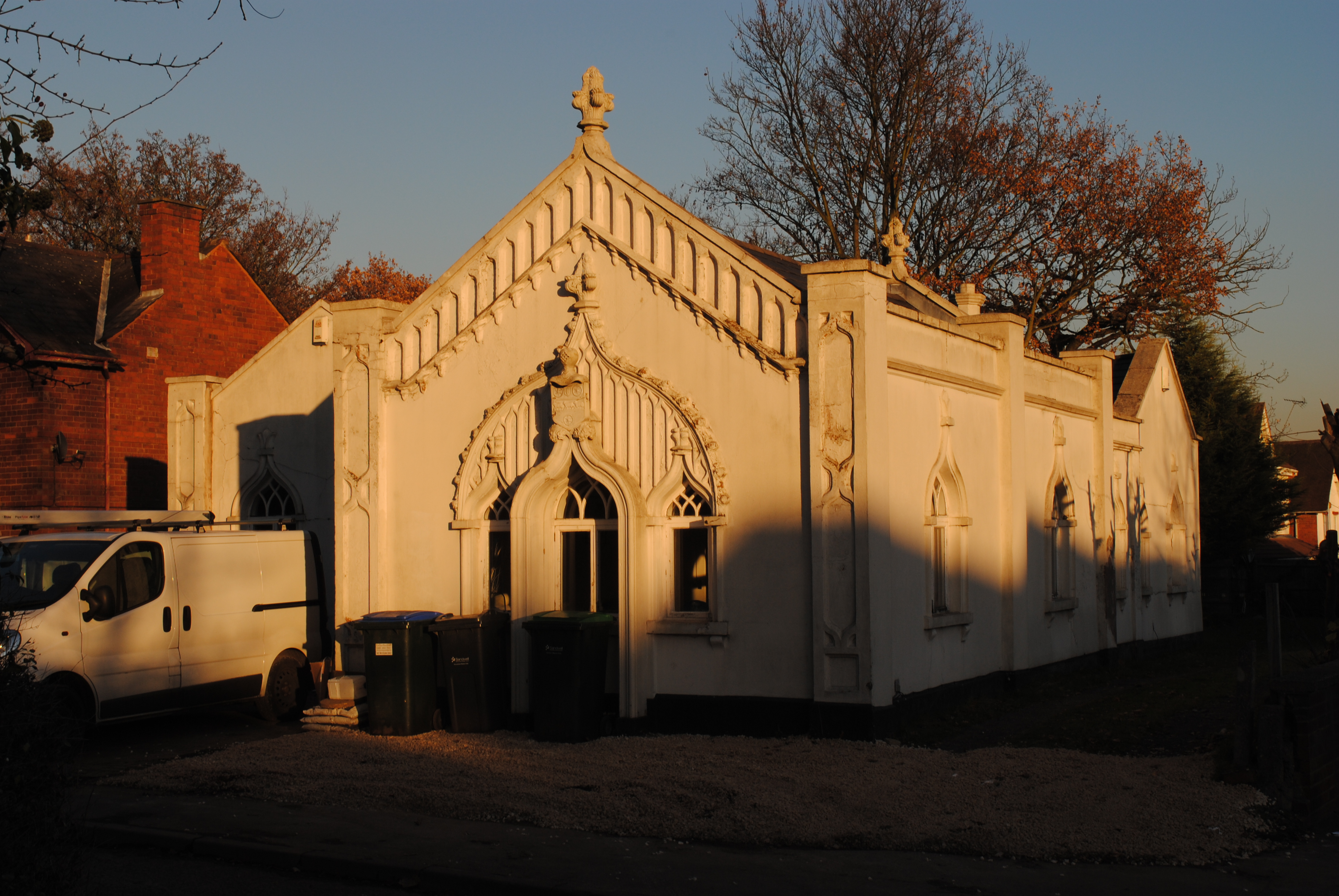
Handsworth Lodge seen in November 2016

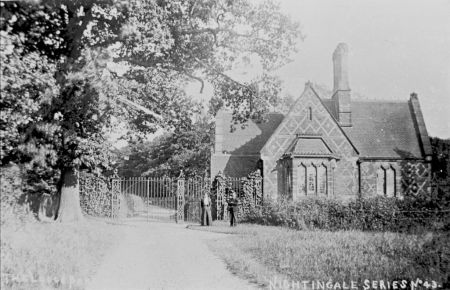
Walsall Lodge on a Frank Nightingale postcard. The herring-bone pattern brickwork has since been overpainted

Church Lodge, circa 1950 (with Avenue Lodge in the background)

Beacon Lodge, in a state of disrepair, circa 1950

Queslett Lodge, circa 1898

The Hall had six lodges, or gatehouses. Three survive:

- Avenue Lodge, on Chapel Lane (52.560556°N 1.930551°W)
- Handsworth Lodge, where Handsworth Drive meets Queslett Road (52.546292°N 1.9246486°W)
- Walsall Lodge (formerly Shustoke Lodge, now known as Merrions Wood Lodge), on Birmingham Road; designed by George Gilbert Scott in 1858 (52.5623476°N 1.9436356°W)

and three are lost:

- Beacon Lodge, on Beacon Road, near the junction with Waverly Avenue (approx. 52.5583335°N 1.9117714°W)
- Church Lodge, opposite Avenue Lodge across Chapel Lane (approx. 52.560474°N 1.930024°W)
- Queslett Lodge, near where Queslett Road meets Beacon Road (approx. 52.5530792°N 1.9098169°W)

Walsall and Queslett Lodges were built to the same design.

== Lakes ==
A pair of large, man-made lakes—now known as Great Barr Hall Upper Lake and Great Barr Hall Lower Lake—are in the grounds of the hall, on two levels, separated by a cascade which is crossed by stepping stones. The upper lake is fed by a stream, the Holbrook, which leaves the lower lake at the southern end, and runs, via Perry Reservoir, to the River Tame, very near the Zig Zag Bridge at Perry Barr. From there, its waters flow, via the Trent, to the Humber and the North Sea.
