= Rushall, West Midlands =

Village in West Midlands, England

Coordinates: 52°36′32″N 1°57′33″W

Rushall
- Village and ward
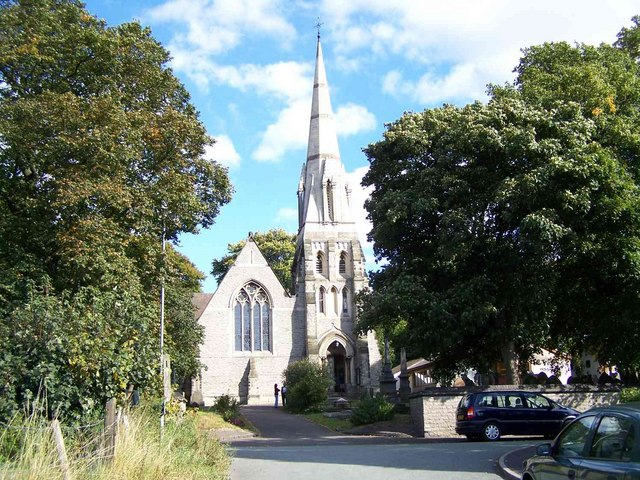
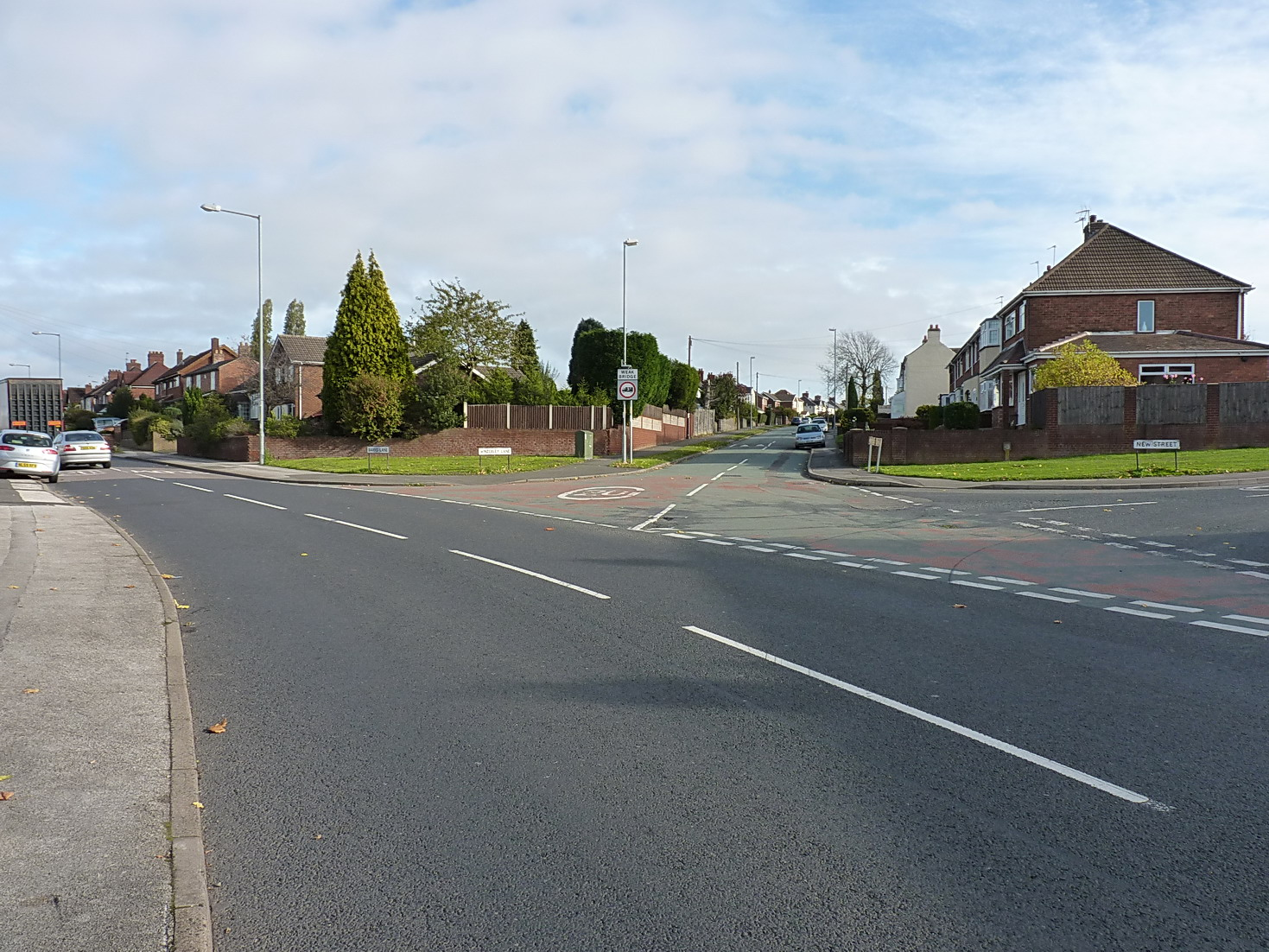
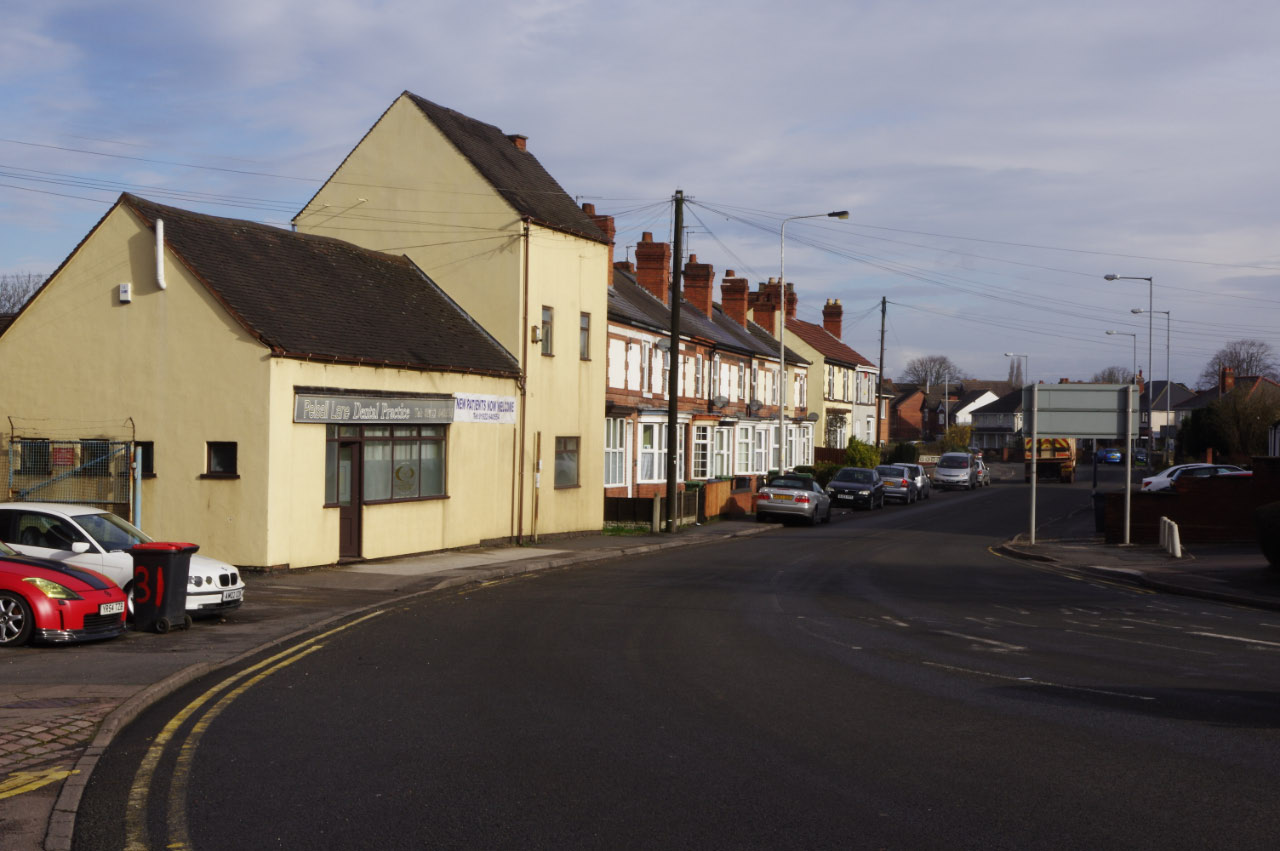
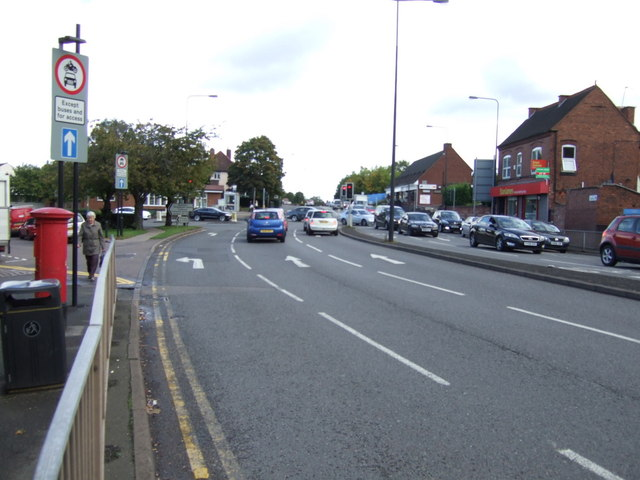
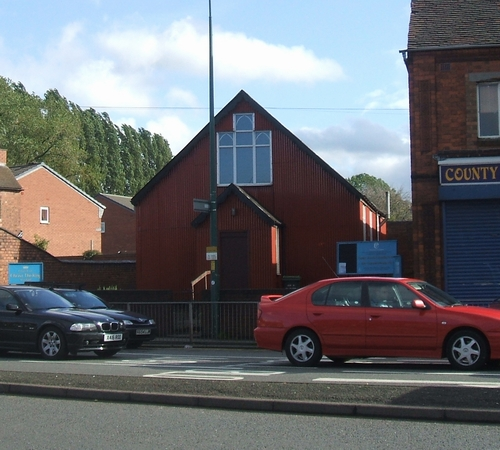
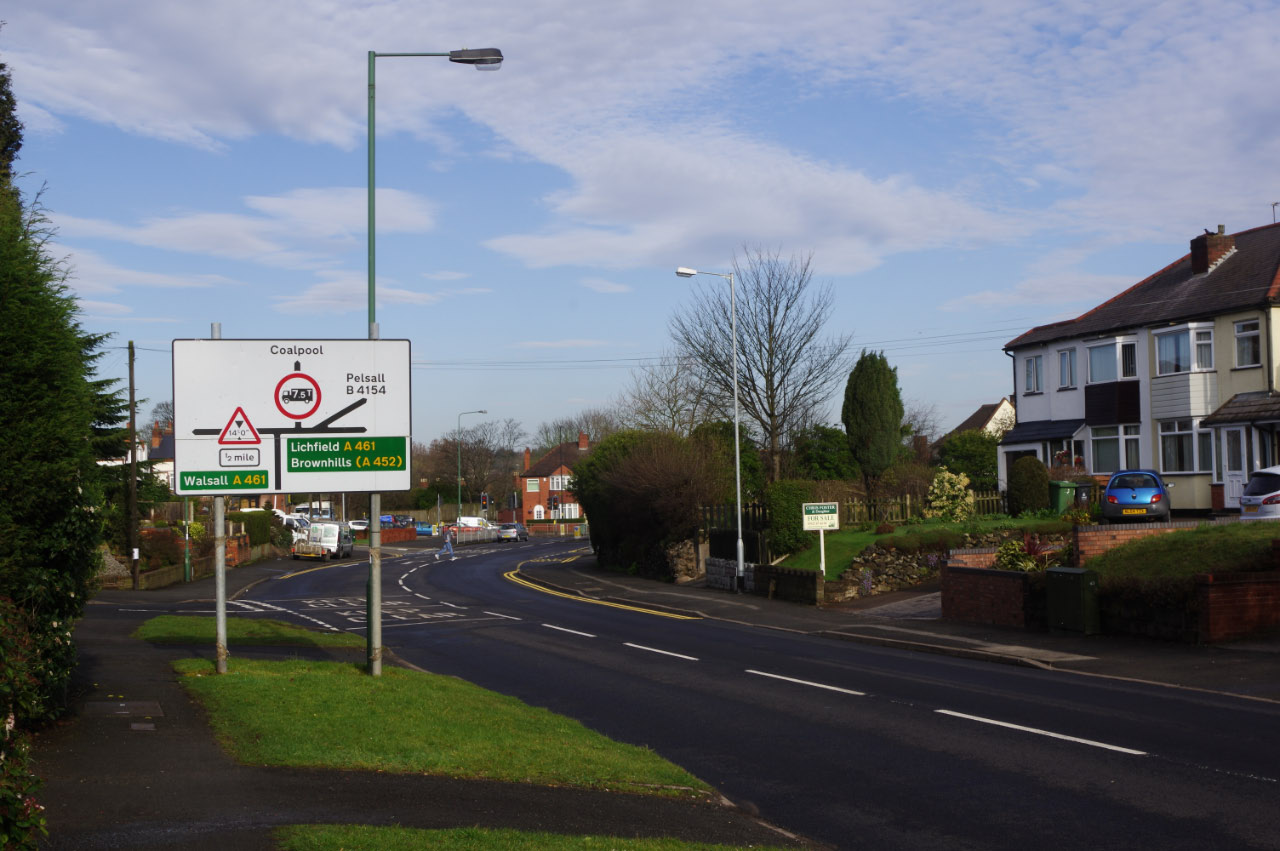
- Clockwise from top: Rushall St. Michael the Archangel Church, Pelsall Lane, Christ the King Church, Daw End Lane, Lichfield Road & junction of Barns Lane/Winterley Lane.

- Location within the West Midlands
- Population: 12,406 (2021 Census)
- OS grid reference: SK027009
- Metropolitan borough: Walsall
- Metropolitan county: West Midlands
- Region: West Midlands
- Country: England
- Sovereign state: United Kingdom
- Areas of the village: List: Coal Pool (Part); Daw End; Goscote (Part); Harden (Part); Heath End (Part); High Heath (Part); Pool Green (Part); Shelfield (Part); Stubber's Green (Part)
- Post town: WALSALL
- Postcode district: WS4
- Dialling code: 01922
- Police: West Midlands
- Fire: West Midlands
- Ambulance: West Midlands
- UK Parliament: Aldridge-Brownhillls (Part); Walsall and Bloxwich (Part)

Rushall is a historic village in the Metropolitan Borough of Walsall in the West Midlands county of England. It is centred on the main road between Walsall and Lichfield. It is mentioned in the Domesday Book but has mostly developed since the 1920s. Rushall was historically a part of the county of Staffordshire before it was incorporated with much of the old Aldridge-Brownhills Urban District into the modern-day Walsall district.

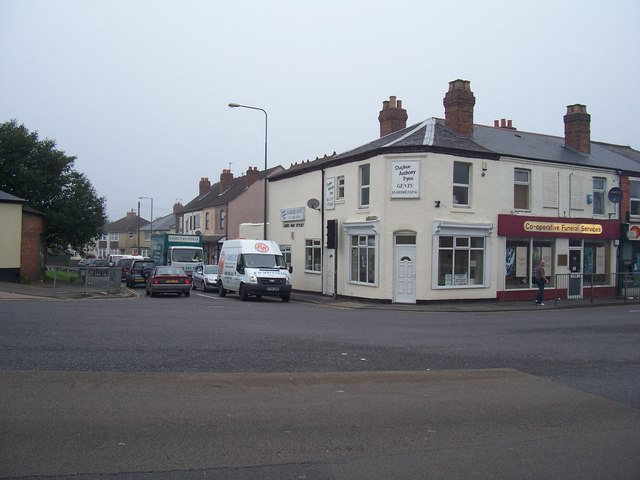
Station Road, Rushall

== Heritage ==
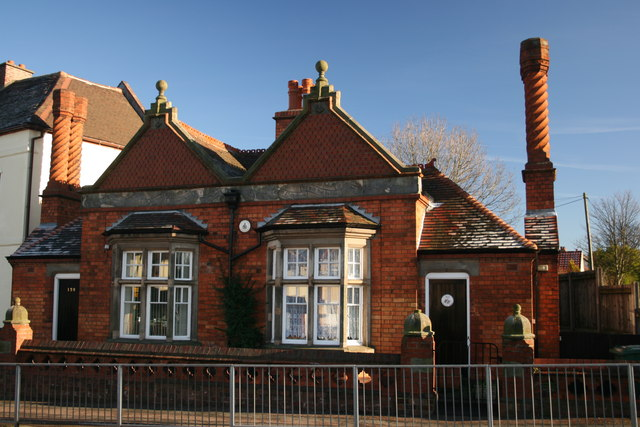
The only property in the village with ornate chimney similar to ones in nearby Caldmore

The first record of Rushall occurs in Domesday Book (1086), where its total annual value to its lord was assessed as 10 shillings, from a village of eight households and a mill. The name means "a place in the marshy ground where rushes grow". Early settlement by the Saxons probably started to the north of Rushall Hall, where there are remains of a moated site: 19th-century excavations found Saxon coins in earthworks in that area. The feudal lordship did not originally have a parish church. The first mention of a place of worship in 1220 describes it as a chapel of Walsall. However, the lords of Rushall secured the chapel's parish status, and in 1440, John Harpur rebuilt Rushall Church on the chapel site next to his manor house. This survived the English Civil War, to be rebuilt in 1854–1866. The old square tower of the house remained until 1867. The remains at Rushall Hall are a scheduled ancient monument.

In 1951 the civil parish had a population of 4794. On 1 April 1966 the parish was abolished to form Aldridge Brownhills, part also went to Walsall.

=== Manors ===
in Rushall is the ruins of the ancient manor house, which during the Wars of the Roses and the English Civil War was strongly fortified and defended by a numerous garrison. During the latter, a Mr Pitt of Wolverhampton attempted to bribe Captain Tuthill to betray the garrison of Rushall, but his treachery was discovered, and he suffered death for it in 1640. Rushall Hall, a modern house, has been built near the ruins.

The manor anciently belonged to the family of Bowles and passed, via Sir William Grobbere, to the Harpurs, one of whom, John Harpur Esq, endowed the vicarage, and rebuilt the church in about 1444. Early in the 17th century, the manor devolved to the Leighs, from whom it passed to the Very Rev Edward Mellish, Dean of Hereford, whose executors, W. and G. Mellish, B. Gurdon and W. Tritton became the principal proprietors and lords of the manor.

Rushall Hall today is mainly a 19th-century structure, incorporating walls from an earlier building. At the time the massive surviving, fortified gatehouse and walls were built in the 13th and 14th centuries, the house itself was probably made of timber. The Leigh family succeeded the Harpurs in the mid-16th century and took a lead in county politics. At the start of the Civil War in 1642, Sir Edward Leigh was an MP and an opponent of the King. He fortified Rushall Hall and joined the Parliamentary Army, being appointed a colonel. His wife, left in command at Rushall, could not hold the Hall against the forces of Prince Rupert in 1643. The Royalists in their turn were ejected after a short siege in 1644. Sir Edward Leigh's younger son was the metaphysical poet Richard Leigh. During the 18th century, the Leighs became absentees, as were their successors, the Mellish and Buchanan families. Limestone of high quality lies near the surface at Rushall. It was exploited by the Romans and through the Middle Ages for building and agricultural purposes. The use of limestone as a flux for smelting iron caused great expansion in mining during the Industrial Revolution. A new settlement grew up at Daw End, and the Hay Head and Linley workings were both on a large scale. The quarries in Rushall Hall's park flooded to become the Park Lime Pits – today a nature reserve. The Arboretum lakes, then also in Rushall, were similarly formed by quarrying.

=== Demography ===
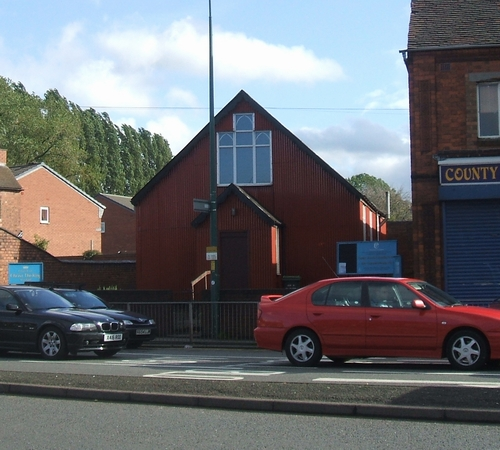
Christ the King Church, Rushall

According to a population estimate which puts Rushall with nearby Shelfield, the population of the ward was 12,182 in a 2020-estimate. The statistics for which found Rushall-Shelfield to be 48.8% Male and 51.2% Female. The religious composition of both settlements was 71% Christian, 22.8% irreligious, 1.1% Muslim, 3% Sikh, 0.6% Hindu and 0.3% Buddhist. The ethnic makeup of the ward was 90% White, 5.4% Asian, 1.8% Black and 2.4% Mixed Race. There are a number of churches in the area and in other nearby settlements. The nearest mosques are in Walsall, Lichfield, Wolverhampton, Birmingham and Birchills. As well as Sikh and Hindu Temples.

== Amenities ==
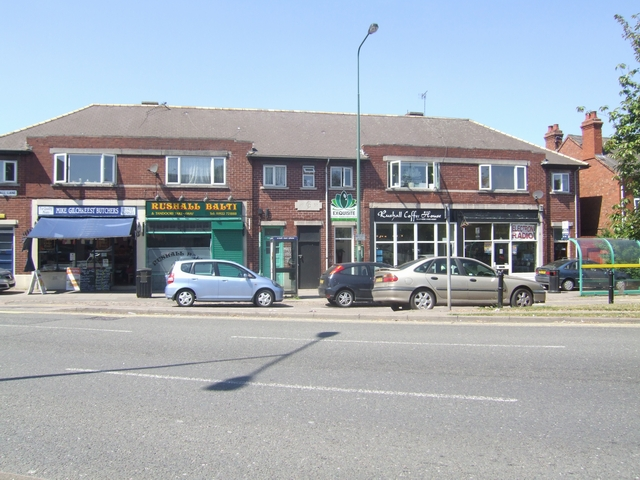
Rushall Main Shopping Centre

Rushall's main shopping centre is divided by a junction controlled by traffic lights on Lichfield Road, Station Road, Daw End Lane, Walsall Road, Pelsall Lane, and Springfields. It contains basic amenities but there is also a war memorial, there was a library until its closure in 2017 as part of a council budget cut, there is a McDonald's on Daw End Lane, there is also a small church called "Christ The King Church", a Labour Club, Travis Perkins factory and Community Centre.

There is also a methodist church on Daw End Lane, two public houses and a nature reserve called "Park Lime Pits Local Nature Reserve". There are also a few takeaways and off licenses in the area.

Rushall Olympic F.C. play on a ground off Dales Lane, Daws End to the south of the village.

== Education ==
Rushall had two secondary schools – Pelsall and Manor Farm – both now closed. There remain two primary schools and a Key Stage 4 centre. It also has a pre-school at Manor Farm, called Piccolo Bambini. Walsall College is also near to Rushall.

== Geography ==
Rushall is 2.3 miles (4 km) north of Walsall, 3 miles (5 km) west of Aldridge, 8 miles (13 km) southwest of Lichfield, 12 miles (19 km) north-northwest of Birmingham, 8 miles (13 km) east of Wolverhampton and 2 miles (3 km) southeast of Bloxwich. It forms part of a residential area with the nearby villages and areas of Shelfield, Pelsall, Ryecroft, Walsall Wood, Blakenall Heath, Pool Green and Leamore which act as suburbs of nearby Walsall, Bloxwich, Aldridge and Brownhills.

Rushall has certain areas which are still rural but it is mostly urban, especially with nearby Shelfield, Walsall, Harden, Ryecroft, Pelsall, and Walsall Wood. There is a small patch of greenbelt on Daw End Lane near Pool Green, Winterley Lane and Walsall Arboretum. The village is between Walsall, Bloxwich, Aldridge, Brownhills, and Lichfield.

== Transport ==
=== Buses ===
Rushall is served primarily by National Express West Midlands and Chaserider with the following services as of 2022:

- 8 (National Express West Midlands) - Walsall to Lichfield via Rushall, Pelsall, Brownhills and Burntwood.
- 9/9A (National Express West Midlands) - Walsall to Wolverhampton via Rushall, Pelsall, Bloxwich, Wednesfield and Heath Town.
- 10 (National Express West Midlands) - Walsall to Brownhills West via Rushall, Walsall Wood and Brownhills.
- 36A (Chaserider) - Walsall to Lichfield via Muckley Corner, Leighswood, Rushall and Aldridge.
- 36 (Chaserider) - Walsall - Lichfield via Rushall, Aldridge, Lazy Hill and Shenstone.
- 997 (National Express West Midlands) - Walsall to Birmingham via Rushall, Aldridge, Pheasey, Old Osscot and Perry Barr.

There are additional services which serve other areas of the village and surrounding settlements.

=== Railways ===
Rushall railway station was open from 1849 to 1909, on the former South Staffordshire Line between Walsall and Lichfield City. The station was located off Station Road between Harden, Ryecroft, Goscote, and Rushall. The site is now part of the McClean Way Greenway but is protected for any future use for rail use.

The village was and is served by several other nearby railway stations including:

=== Former ===
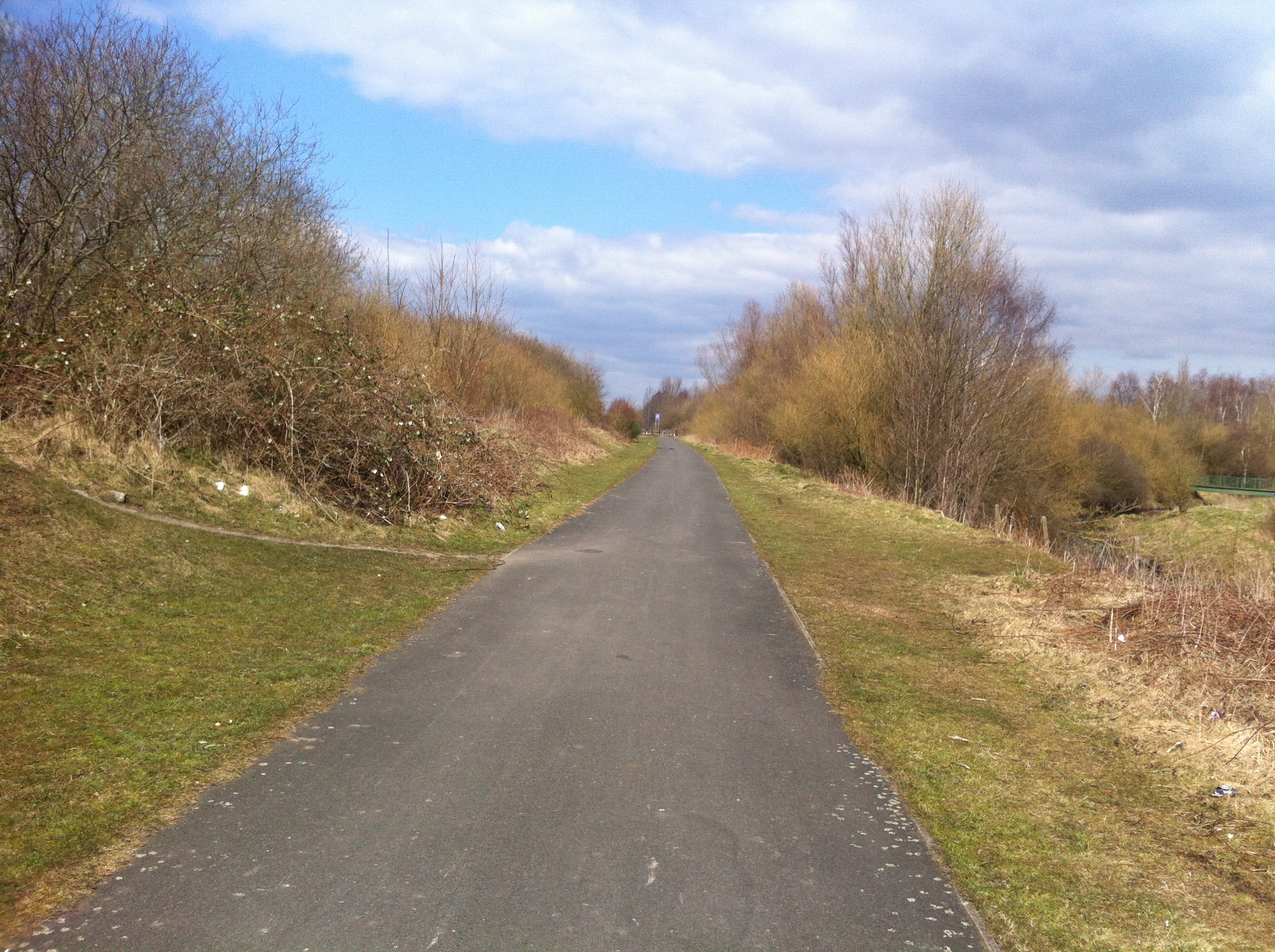
Rushall station site on the disused South Staffordshire Line (Now a greenway)

- Aldridge on the Sutton Park Line between Water Orton and Walsall. The line is still in use for freight and a new Aldridge station is due to be built in the future as well as the possible reopening of the line to Water Orton.
- Birchills Halt on the Chase Line in nearby Leamore and around 2 miles away.
- North Walsall on the former Wolverhampton and Walsall Railway in nearby Birchills and Leamore which was located around 2 miles away.
- Pelsall on the former South Staffordshire Line between Walsall and Lichfield City. The site is now part of the McClean Way Greenway but is protected for any future use for rail use.
- Walsall Wood on the former Aldridge-Brownhills Branch between Brownhills Watling Street and Aldridge. Now occupied by Oak Park Leisure Centre and a park.

=== Current ===
- Blake Street on the Cross-City Line between Lichfield Trent Valley and Birmingham New Street.
- Bloxwich on the Chase Line between Birmingham, Walsall, Cannock and Rugeley Trent Valley.
- Shenstone on the Cross-City Line between Lichfield and Birmingham.
- Walsall, a junction for the Chase Line, Walsall-Wolverhampton Line and former Grand Junction Railway.

=== Airports ===
The nearest airport is Birmingham Airport as well as Manchester Airport, John Lennon Airport, and East Midlands Airport. Private airports nearby are both Aldridge Airport and Wolverhampton Airport.
