= Forest Comprehensive School =

School in Walsall, West Midlands, England

Forest Comprehensive School was a secondary school located in Hawbush Road, Harden, Walsall, West Midlands, England.

It was built during the 1950s to serve the council housing estates in the Blakenall Heath, Harden, Goscote and Coalpool areas, which had gradually developed since 1920, and was originally known as W.R. Wheway School (with secondary modern status) until becoming Forest Comprehensive in September 1973.

It remained open until July 1992 when it closed due to falling pupil numbers.

The school buildings have been retained as the Hawbush Centre, which serves the local community for activities such as recreation and adult education.
