= Stubbers Green =

Suburb of Aldridge in West Midlands, England

Coordinates: 52.613°N 1.938°W

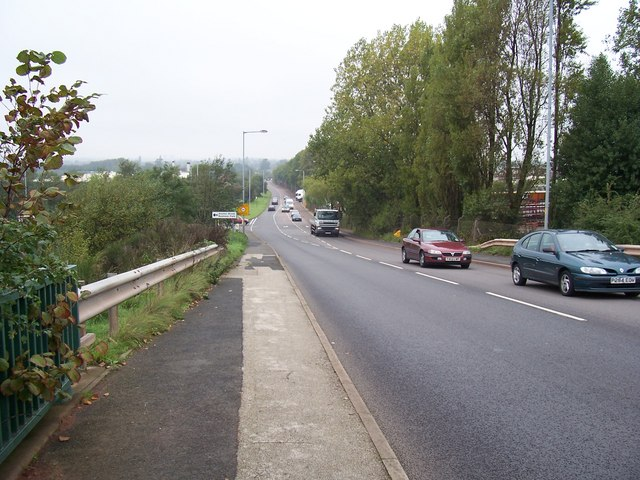
- Stubber's Green Road, Aldridge

- Location within the West Midlands
- OS grid reference: SK042017
- Metropolitan borough: Walsall
- Metropolitan county: West Midlands
- Region: West Midlands
- Country: England
- Sovereign state: United Kingdom
- Post town: ALDRIDGE
- Postcode district: WS9
- Dialling code: 01922
- Police: West Midlands
- Fire: West Midlands
- Ambulance: West Midlands
- UK Parliament: Aldridge-Brownhills

Stubbers Green or Stubber's Green is an area in the Metropolitan Borough of Walsall in the West Midlands county of England. It is 3 miles (4.8 km) northeast of Walsall and lies inbetween the villages of Rushall and Shelfield and the town of Aldridge. There are two Sites of Special Scientific Interest in the area. Coal mining took place from the mid-19th century to early 20th century.

== Mining and quarrying ==
Shafts of the Coppy Hall Colliery were sunk circa 1857 through 210 feet (64 m) of red marl to the coal measures. Ironstone was also worked. In 1906 the colliery employed 258 underground and 83 surface workers, but closed three years later. Quarrying of the clay for brickmaking has also taken place.

== Stubbers Green Bog ==
Stubbers Green Bog is a privately owned 3-hectare (7-acre) biological site of Special Scientific Interest. Following a public campaign in 1985, the site was notified in 1986 under the Wildlife and Countryside Act 1981. There is a pool in a depression likely caused by subsidence from coal mining. Two drainage ditches connected to the pool help replenish the water level. Around part of the pool is a mire consisting of a water-logged area of peat and sphagnum moss overlain by common cottongrass, bog pondweed, common spike-rush, common fleabane and rushes. Walsall Council report this habitat type as rare in England, though the site's ecological value is described as "uncertain", owing to pressure from invasive scrub of goat willow and sallow. There is no public access.

A 1939 drawing, Stubbers Green Pool, Walsall Wood, by Theodore Garman, is in the Garman Ryan Collection at The New Art Gallery Walsall.

== Swan Pool and The Swag ==
Swan Pool and The Swag is a 5.7-hectare (14-acre) biological site of Special Scientific Interest. The site was notified in 1986 under the Wildlife and Countryside Act 1981. Beneath Stubbers Green Road a culvert links Swan Pool with another pool known as The Swag. A book published in 1987 says the pools were a "nationally important swallow roost", however, Walsall Council suggest this is no longer the case. Common snipe and jack snipe spend the winter nearby and shelter in the reed beds. Western Yellow Wagtails roost at The Swag in autumn. The banks of both pools are publicly accessible. Aldridge Sailing Club, a Royal Yachting Association recognised centre has facilities at The Swag. In May 2020, about 100 dead fish were found floating on The Swag. The Environment Agency thought the incident may have been the result of hot weather and a lack of rainfall, but an investigation by Walsall Council found reduced oxygen levels caused by a blocked inlet.. All land within Swan Pool and The Swag SSSI is owned by the local authority.

== See also ==
- List of Sites of Special Scientific Interest in the West Midlands
