= Harden, Walsall =

Suburb of Bloxwich and Walsall in West Midlands, England

Coordinates: 52°36′26″N 1°59′04″W

Harden
- Suburb
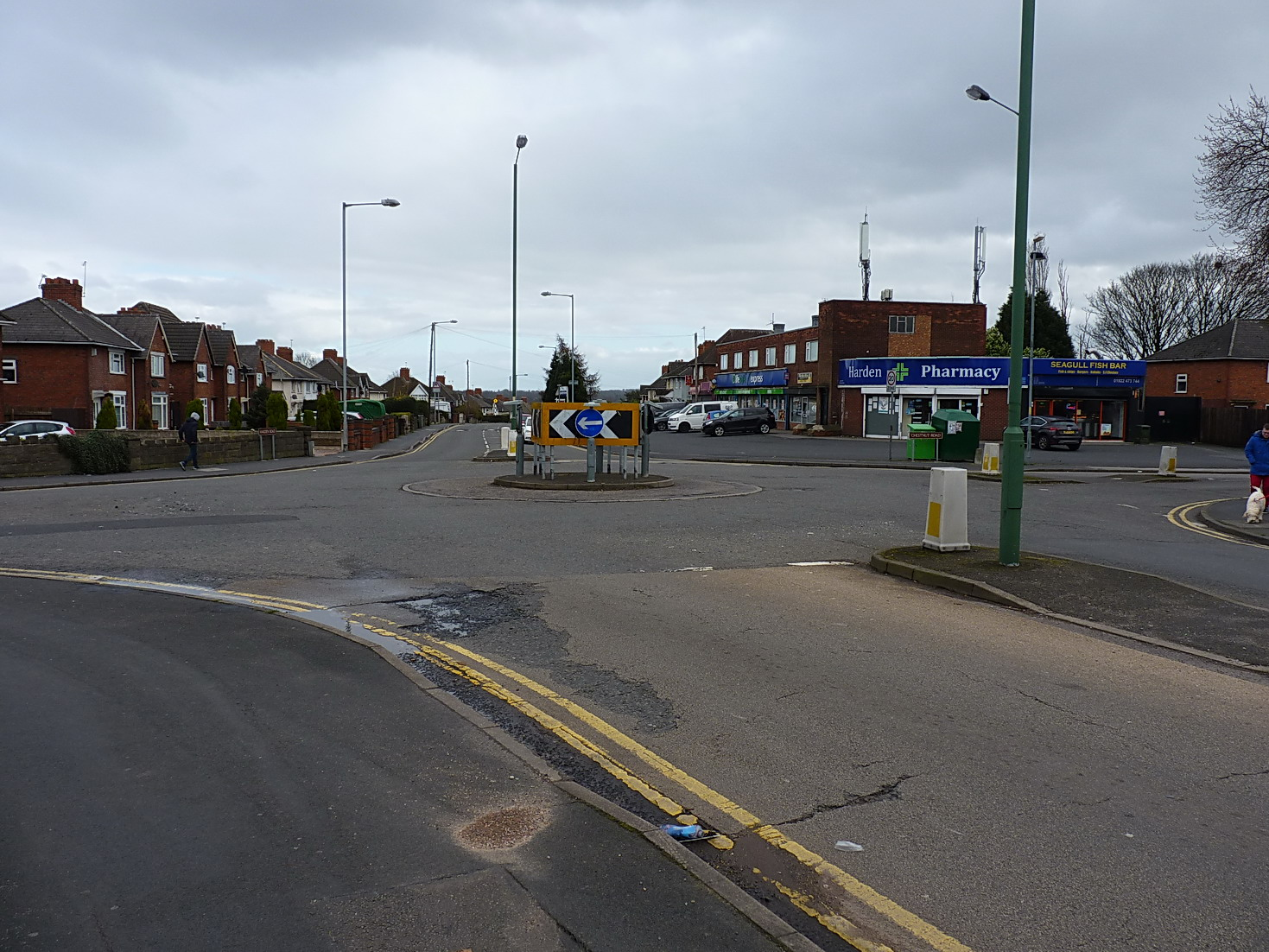
- Harden Road, Harden, Walsall

- Location within the West Midlands
- OS grid reference: SK012011
- Metropolitan borough: Walsall
- Metropolitan county: West Midlands
- Region: West Midlands
- Country: England
- Sovereign state: United Kingdom
- Post town: WALSALL
- Postcode district: WS3
- Dialling code: 01922
- Police: West Midlands
- Fire: West Midlands
- Ambulance: West Midlands
- UK Parliament: Walsall and Bloxwich

Harden is an area to the north of Walsall and borders with Bloxwich, Blakenall Heath, Coalpool, Goscote and Rushall. The whole area was part of the Industrial Revolution, with mining and metal processing being the main industries. Although close to the A34 main road from the Stoke (potteries) to Birmingham, it is still served by canals.

== School ==
Harden Infant School for 5-7 year olds was opened in 1938 on Goldsmith Road, with the Junior School for 7 to 11 year olds being added a year later. A nursery unit was later added to the infant school, and the infant and junior schools merged in September 1994 to form an 3-11 primary school. The school became Goldsmith Primary Academy in September 2012.

The south of Harden was developed for further council housing in the 1940s and 1950s, when the new W.R. Wheway School was opened for children aged 11 upwards. It became Forest Comprehensive (an 11-16 school) in September 1973, but closed 19 years later. The building has survived as the Hawbush Centre, a local community centre.

== Redevelopment ==
In August 1991, Walsall Council announced that more than 30 houses in Shakespeare Crescent would be demolished. Several of these houses had already become empty and been targeted by vandals and arsonists, while some of the houses still occupied were in disrepair, including one house which had been used as a warehouse by a scrap metal dealer who was living in a caravan in the front garden. These houses were demolished during 1992 and 1993.

There was uproar in May 2004 when Bloxwich Housing Trust announced plans to demolish nearly 900 homes across the Blakenall ward, with Harden being included in the plans as well as neighbouring Goscote and Blakenall Heath. Local residents complained that demolition of the estate would break up the established local community which had settled and expanded into younger generations over the previous 70 years, while other residents accused the local authority of deliberately running the area down so they would have to pay as little as possible when buying the privately owned homes under compulsory purchase as part of the redevelopment.

Nearly all of the demolished houses in Harden were on the Poet's Estate, which was built during the 1930s. More than a decade after the first houses there had been demolished, a more extensive demolition project took place between 2005 and 2007. Some homes on the estate which had originally been earmarked for demolition have instead been retained. The regeneration of the estate was almost complete by 2018, featuring both private and social housing. New street names featured in the regeneration, with Shakespeare Crescent being renamed Turnstone Road. Tennyson Road and Wordsworth Road also vanished in favour of new addresses. The area around Goldsmith Road, Masefield Road, Chaucer Road and Dryden Road has survived the redevelopment, while one side of Keats Road was demolished and the housing on the opposite side retained.

The Forest Estate at Harden was developed at around the same time as the Poet's Estate, on the southern opposite side of Harden Road, but more than 200 council houses were added in the 1950s and so was a new secondary modern school, which was known as Forest Comprehensive School for around 20 years until its closure 1992 due to falling pupil numbers. The remaining pupils were transferred to Frank F. Harrison School in nearby Leamore, but the Forest buildings were retained as Hawbush Centre community facility. This section of Harden has suffered less of the problems which affected areas like the Poet's Estate, and the emphasis on improving the housing and environment in more recent times has been on modernisation rather than demolition.
