= Rushall railway station (England) =

Former railway station in England

Rushall
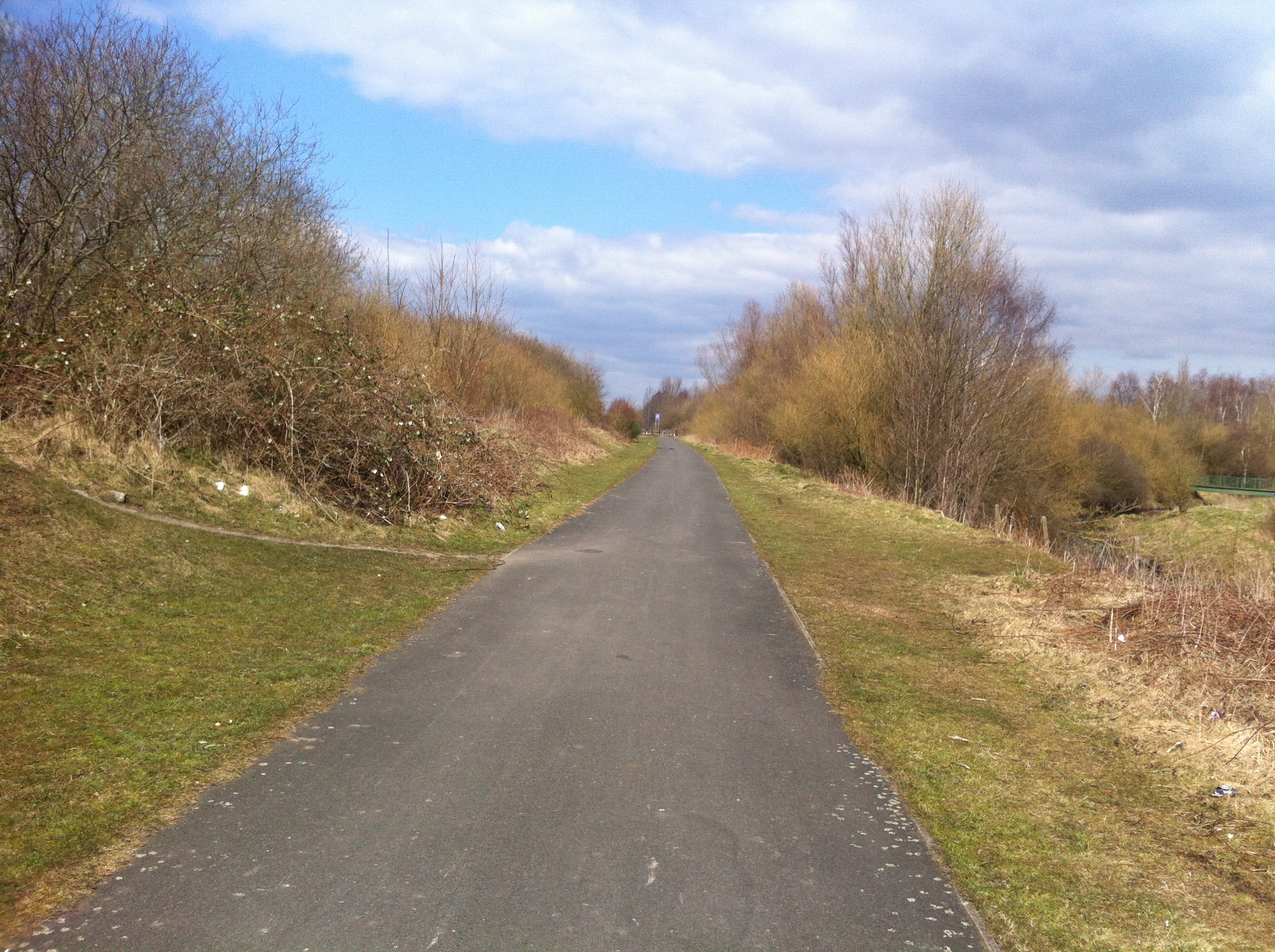
- Site of the former station on 2013

General information
- Location: Blakenall Heath and Rushall, Walsall; England
- Coordinates: 52.6069°N 1.9683°W
- Grid reference: SK022010
- Platforms: 2

Other information
- Status: Disused

History
- Original company: South Staffordshire Railway
- Pre-grouping: London and North Western Railway

Key dates
- 9 April 1849: Opened
- 1 March 1909: Closed
Location

Rushall railway station was a station serving the villages of Blakenall Heath and Rushall in the Metropolitan Borough of Walsall, England. It was on the South Staffordshire Line between Walsall and Lichfield.

== History ==
It was opened in 1849. It was the first station to fall on the line, closing in 1909. The station was built and served by the South Staffordshire Railway, which later became London, Midland and Scottish Railway (through amalgamation of the London and North Western Railway).

The station was situated on a level crossing in Harden Road, roughly on the border of Walsall and Bloxwich townships. Trains continued to pass through the site more than 70 years after the station's closure, with the line remaining open to goods trains until December 1983. It is preserved in case the railway line between Walsall and Lichfield reopens.

== Station site today ==
All evidence of the former station site and the level crossing including the signal box have been wiped away by the former crossing forming part of Station and Harden Road. The trackbed on both ends are now pedestrian footpaths with the site of the level crossing now part of a road realignment. The southern end of the trackbed from Walsall to Rushall is the end of the footpath with the rest of the trackbed to Ryecroft Junction being heavily overgrown.

Preceding station	Disused railways	Following station
Pelsall	South Staffordshire Railway; Later LNWR, then LMS, finally BR; South Staffs Line (1849-1965)	Walsall
