= High Heath =

Area of Pelsall in West Midlands, England

Coordinates: 52.620443°N 1.954992°W

- Suburb
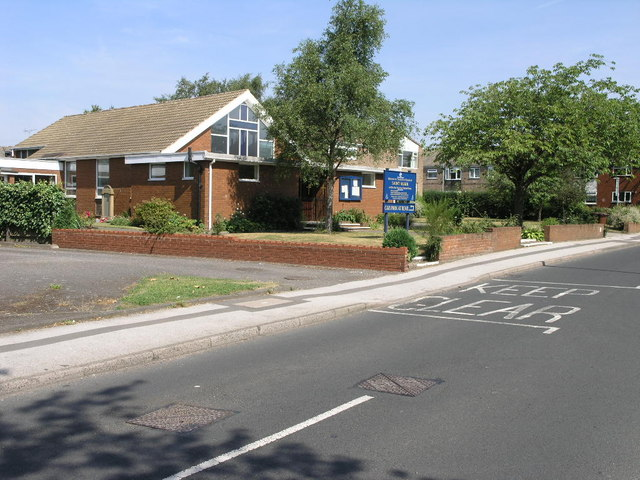
- St Mark's Church, High Heath

- Location within the West Midlands
- OS grid reference: SK031027
- Metropolitan borough: Walsall
- Metropolitan county: West Midlands
- Region: West Midlands
- Country: England
- Sovereign state: United Kingdom
- Post town: WALSALL
- Postcode district: WS4
- Dialling code: 01922
- Police: West Midlands
- Fire: West Midlands
- Ambulance: West Midlands
- UK Parliament: Aldridge-Brownhills

High Heath is an area of Shelfield in the Metropolitan Borough of Walsall in the West Midlands county of England. It is located to the northeast of Walsall and west of Aldridge. It is immediately adjoined to the villages of Pelsall and Shelfield. The area consists mostly of residential estates and home to a small shopping precedent on Spring Lane. As well as two churches on Mill Road and Green Lane. Also nearby is a former Primitive Methodist Church on Coronation Road/Broad Way, this is now a private residence.
