= Shelfield =

Coordinates: 52°37′07″N 1°57′07″W

- Village and ward
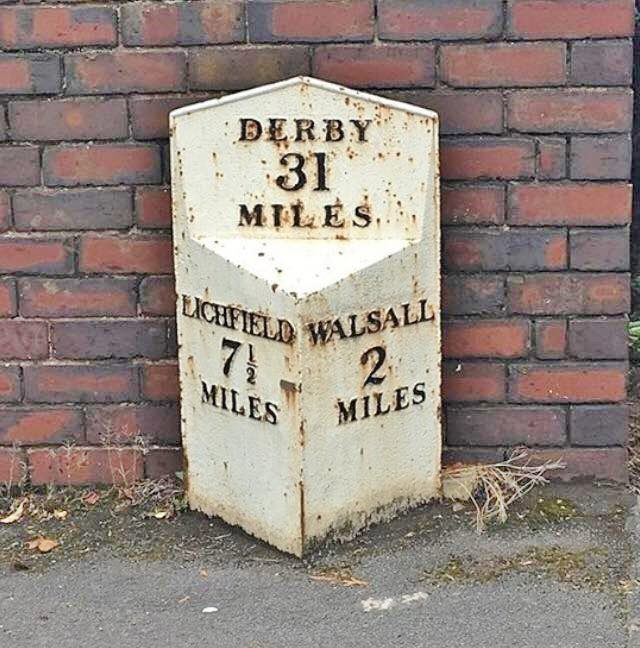
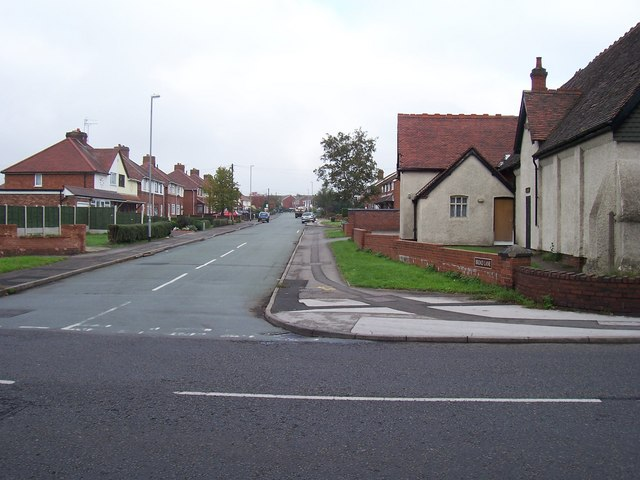
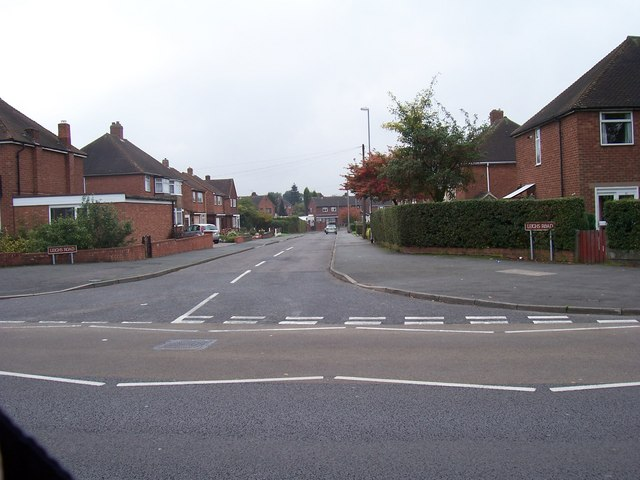
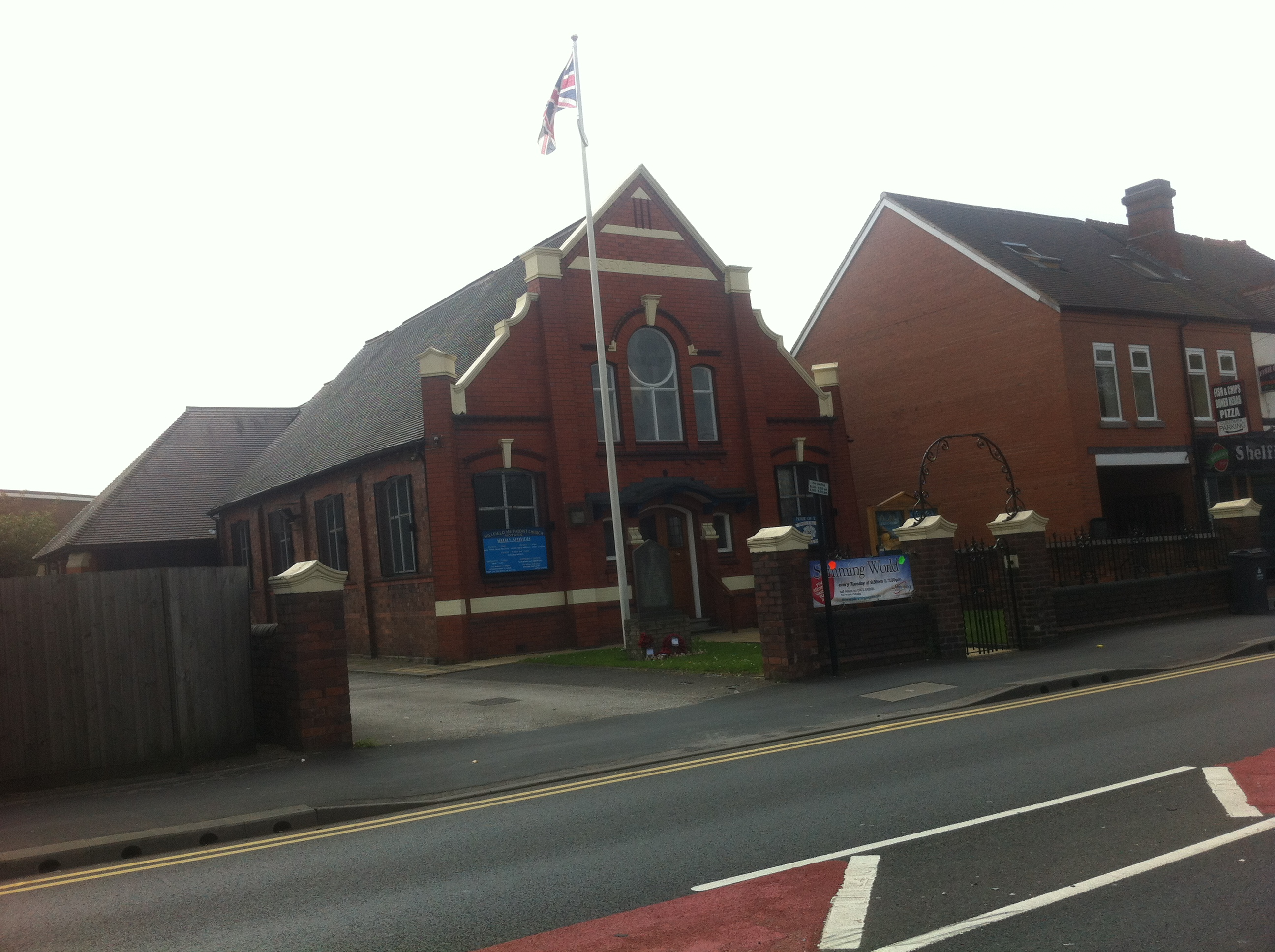
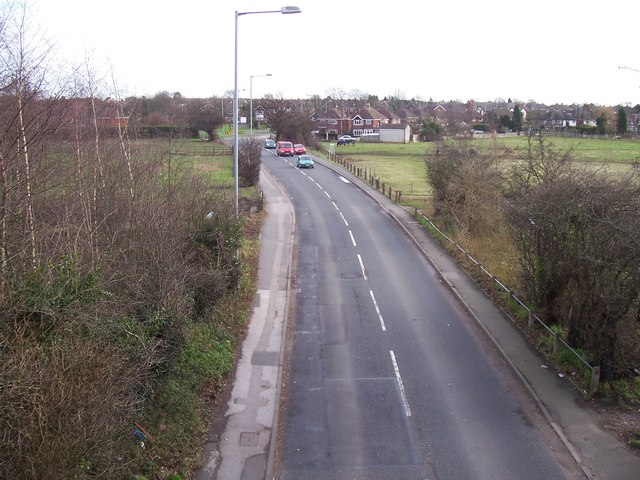
- Clockwise from top: Shelfield Old Milepost on the A461 road, Leighs Road, Fordbrook Lane, Methodist Church on Lichfield Road & Broad Lane

- Location within the West Midlands
- Population: 12,406 (2021 Census)
- OS grid reference: SK034020
- Metropolitan borough: Walsall
- Metropolitan county: West Midlands
- Region: West Midlands
- Country: England
- Sovereign state: United Kingdom
- Areas of the village: List: High Heath; Rushall (Part); Stubber's Green (Part); Walsall Wood (Part)
- Post town: WALSALL
- Postcode district: WS4
- Dialling code: 01922
- Police: West Midlands
- Fire: West Midlands
- Ambulance: West Midlands
- UK Parliament: Aldridge-Brownhills

Shelfield is a historic village in the borough of Walsall in the West Midlands, England. It is conjoined by the nearby suburbs of Walsall Wood and Rushall. The name Shelfield derives from the Anglo Saxon Skelfeld for sloping ground or field.

Shelfield is mentioned in the Domesday Book as containing a hide of waste belonging to the Manor of Walsall.

Transliterating the Domesday Book Latin the entry reads: In Scelfeld est hida vasta pertinens eidem Manerio. In English: In Shelfield there is one hide of waste appertaining to the said Manor. This interpretation is further justified by a 1469 quitclaim in Walsall which records a witness named Richard Scelfelde; implying 'Scelfelde' is the ablative form of Scelfeld denoting "Richard of Shelfield." As such, we see the name Shelfield not only in Old English, but also now in Latin.

== Railway ==
Although not having its own station nor halt, Shelfield had a small branch line from which left the Heath End sidings just south of Pelsall railway station, onto an embankment which passed over the Ford Brook and then the "Donkey Bridge" pathway followed by a cutting under two bridges, one on the Four Crosses Road and immediately followed by the Lichfield Road bridge and onto to the colliery fields at Walsall Wood. The old bridge brick wall is still intact on the west side of the Lichfield Road despite the deep cutting behind the wall being completely filled in following the line's closure. It was a single track and the branch line served Leighswood Colliery and crossed the Daw End Branch Canal. The goods traffic to Leighswood Colliery ended in the 1930s but the branch line continued to serve Atlas Brickworks until the closure of the works in 1964.

The branch line has since been built on in parts however the cutting between Four Crosses and Lichfield Road can still be seen from the Co-op and Esso garage and is still there on the one side of the bridge with the other side being occupied by houses and commercial buildings. The section from Pelsall to Shelfield now forms part of the Timberland Trail/Mercian Trail.

== Education ==
Greenfield Primary is in Shelfield, with 292 pupils in January 2007. High Heath in Shelfield is home to the Shelfield Community Academy, which went through a 6 million pound refurbishment in 2002. Formerly called Shelfield Sports and Community College, it changed its title to Shelfield Community Academy in January 2009, and was turned into an Academy funded by the Ormiston Academies Trust. Shelfield is also home to St Francis, Catholic Primary School which is located adjacent to the Catholic Church.
