= Walsall Wood =

Village in the West Midlands, England

Coordinates: 52.627660°N 1.9301°W

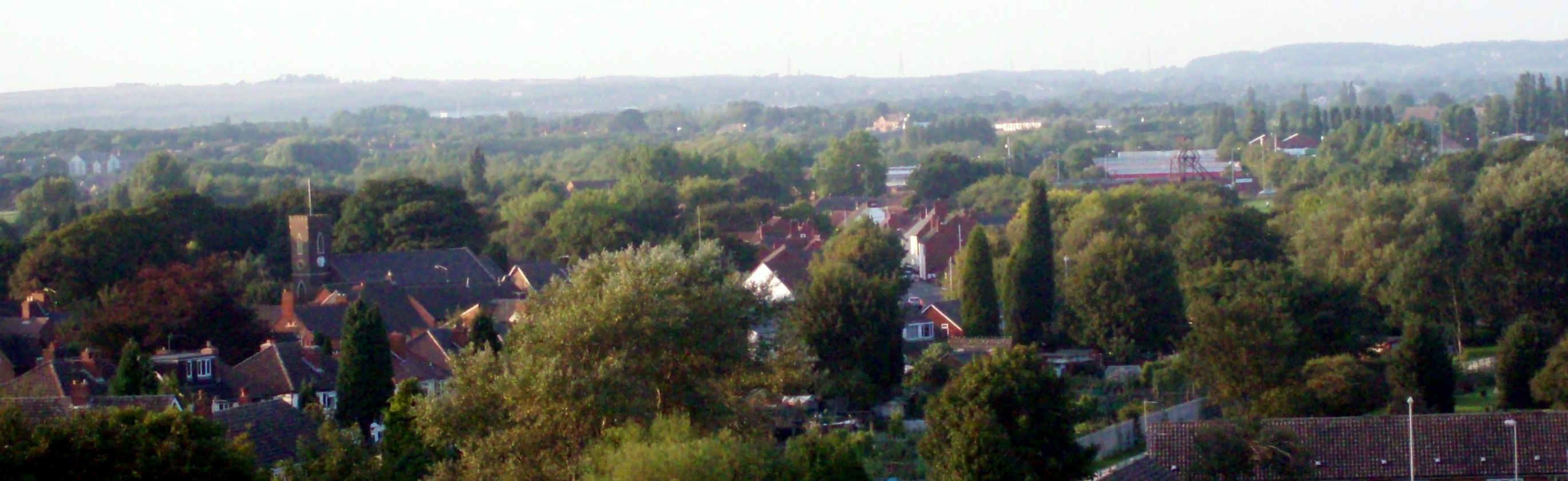
- View of Walsall Wood from the south

- Location within the West Midlands
- Population: 13,207 (2011 Census.Ward Aldridge North and Walsall Wood)
- OS grid reference: SK049033
  - London: 126 mi (203 km) SE
- Metropolitan borough: Walsall
- Metropolitan county: West Midlands
- Region: West Midlands
- Country: England
- Sovereign state: United Kingdom
- Post town: WALSALL
- Postcode district: WS8, WS9
- Dialling code: 01543
- Police: West Midlands
- Fire: West Midlands
- Ambulance: West Midlands
- UK Parliament: Aldridge-Brownhills

Walsall Wood is a suburban village in the Metropolitan Borough of Walsall, in the West Midlands county, England. It is midway between the towns of Aldridge and Brownhills, as well as Walsall and Lichfield.

== History ==
In the late-18th century and early-19th century, the workers of Walsall Wood were primarily involved in the mining of limestone. In 1864, the population of the settlement expanded as Walsall Wood Colliery was opened, as well as another colliery in nearby Shelfield. The Walsall Wood Colliery purchased the Pelsall Colliery from Pelsall Coal & Iron Co. in 1894. The opening of the Walsall Wood Colliery saw the establishment of the first public services, including a police station and a post office. The mine was closed in 1964 when the supply of accessible coal had been exhausted. In 2010 a memorial pithead designed by artist Luke Perry was erected to commemorate the village's mining heritage. It is one of a number of artworks by Perry. The Fisherman, next to the bridge on the High Street, had to be mounted on a three-metre plinth to allow it to be seen from the road. Despite the height of the work, locals replaced the fish which originally hung from the rod, with a golden Wellington boot, they then swapped that for the Olympic rings in July 2012.

St John's Church in Walsall Wood was constructed in 1837 at a cost of £1,200. The church, with its quadrangular tower, is in the Gothic style, whilst the parsonage house is in the Elizabethan style. The church is constructed out of blue brick with stone dressings and has a capacity of 400. The current minister-in-charge is Reverend David Paul Simon Babbington. In front of the church is the Grade II listed war memorial. This area of Walsall Wood was historically known as Vigo.

== Local government ==
Walsall Wood is part of the Aldridge North and Walsall Wood ward, in the Aldridge-Brownhills constituency, the MP of which is presently Wendy Morton, taking over from Richard Shepherd (Conservative). The area is represented by three Conservative councillors, Karl Brookhouse, Russell Bird and James Powell.

On 31 December 1894 Walsall Wood became a civil parish, being formed from the part of the parish of Walsall Foreign in Brownhills Urban District, on 1 April 1966 the parish was abolished to form Aldridge Brownhills. In 1951 the parish had a population of 9094.

== 2011 census information ==
The population in 2011 was 13,207 a 2.5% increase from 2001. 48.9% of the population being Male and 51.1% Female. 42.3 years old is the mean average age of a resident in the area.

Ethnicity Breakdown: White (British) – 93.6% (12,362) White (Other) – 1.5% (195) Mixed – 1.7% (224) Asian – 2.1% (283) Black – 0.8% (105) Other – 0.3% (38)

Unemployment for the area was 4.7%. The borough of Walsall 6.8%.

== Education ==
Shire Oak School is in Walsall Wood. Walsall Wood is also home to Castlefort Junior School, St Johns Junior School and Walsall Wood Junior School.

== Sport ==
Walsall Wood F.C. is a football club competing in the Midland Football League 1st Division. The club play their home games at Oak Park.

Walsall Wood was also home to Formula 1 team Ensign Racing from 1973 to 1980 being based opposite Castlefort Primary School. Their best result being a 4th place in the 1981 Brazilian GP They later relocated to Burntwood until 1982.

== Recreation and entertainment ==
Oak Park is a recreation centre located in Lichfield Road in Walsall Wood, which opened in 1974. This centre consists of two swimming pools, an astro-turf football pitch, bowls lawn (mostly flooded), BMX & Skate Park (mostly unused) along with other sporting facilities. The centre moved to Coppice Road in Walsall Wood in 2016. The Lichfield Road centre was demolished in 2017.

Walsall Wood Library on Coppice Road permanently closed in 2017. The site of the former library building on Lichfield Road has also undergone redevelopment.

== Transport ==
Walsall Wood is served by four bus routes which are:

- 10 (National Express West Midlands), between Walsall and Brownhills
- 936 (National Express West Midlands), between Walsall and Birmingham
- 937/937A (National Express West Midlands), between Brownhills and Birmingham
- X35 (Diamond Bus) between Walsall and Lichfield.

There is also Diamond Bus service 35 from Walsall to Lichfield via Aldridge which runs at the top end of Walsall Wood near Streets Corner.

Service X35 was previously numbered 991 and was once part of a much longer route, 901. This "Timesaver" branded route, operated by West Midlands Travel, started in 1986 and ran the same route as the current X35 but then continued to Birmingham via Sutton Coldfield. The service was split a few years later into the 991 and 901. The 991 ran every 90 minutes while the 901 was later withdrawn from serving Lichfield.

Walsall Wood railway station was opened in 1884, the station served the residents of Walsall Wood until 1930 when the passenger services were withdrawn although the odd DMU service would see passenger activity at the closed station. The line continued to serve as a goods line until the closure of the line in 1962. The line through the station was considered to be more of a colliery traffic route then a passenger service. The station is occupied by a park and houses now occupy the trackbed. Although some track is still preserved as either a footpath or agriculture.
