= Aldridge railway station =

Disused railway station in Aldridge, Walsall

Aldridge
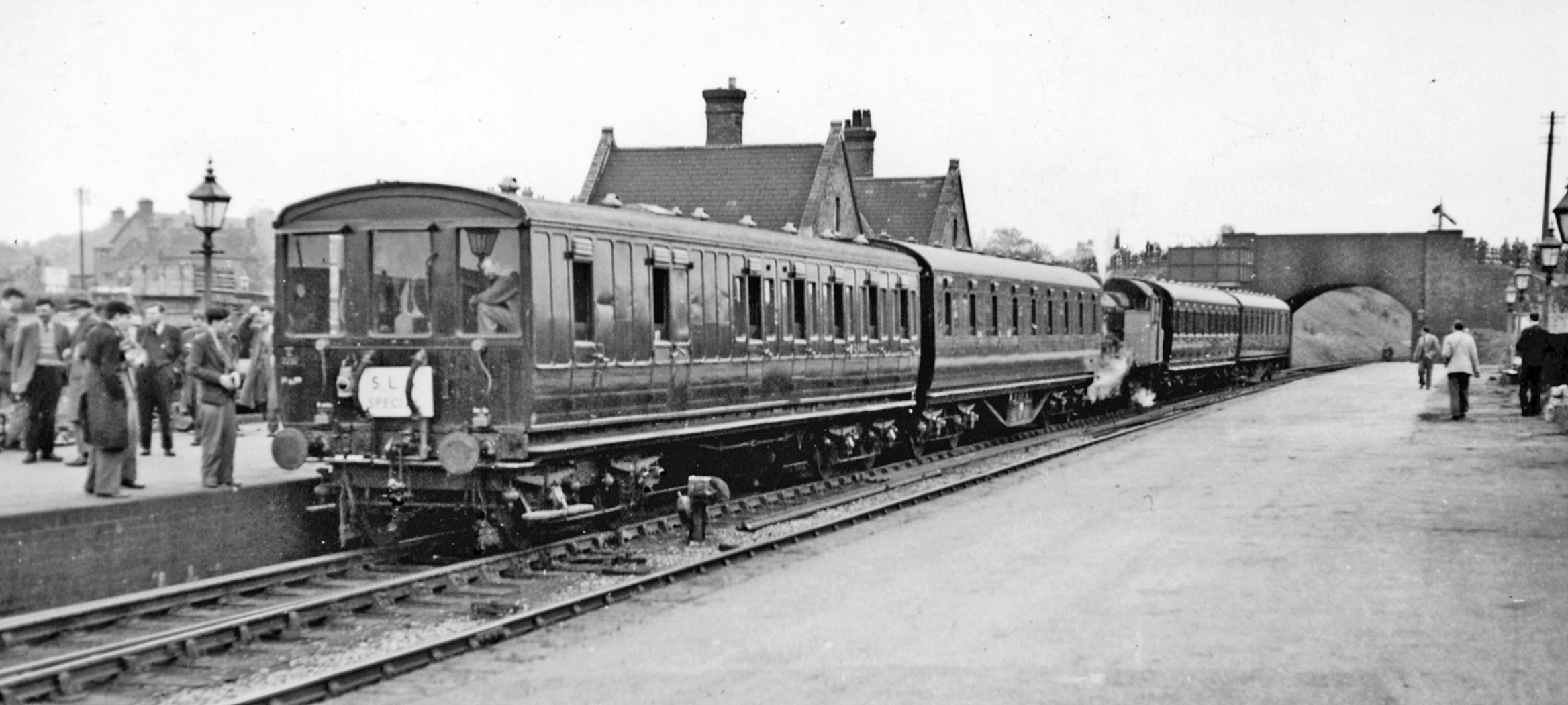
- Aldridge station, 1951

General information
- Location: Aldridge, Walsall; England
- Coordinates: 52.6020°N 1.9212°W
- Grid reference: SK053005
- Platforms: 2

Other information
- Status: Disused

History
- Pre-grouping: Midland Railway

Key dates
- 1 July 1879: Station Opened
- 18 January 1965: Station Closed
Location

Aldridge railway station is a former station on the Midland Railway in England. It was opened in 1879, closed in 1965 and subsequently demolished, although the track through the station site is still in use for freight.

== History ==
Opened by the Midland Railway in 1879, Aldridge railway station became part of the London, Midland and Scottish Railway during the Grouping of 1923. The line then passed on to the London Midland Region of British Railways on nationalisation in 1948. The station was closed by the British Railways Board in 1965 as part of the Beeching cuts and subsequently demolished.

Freight trains still pass the site on the Sutton Park Line.

== Reopening ==
In 2009, the Association of Train Operating Companies included the station in a list of proposed station re-openings.

In February 2021 it was announced that land had been purchased in Aldridge near the site of its former railway station as part of plans led by the then Mayor of the West Midlands Andy Street and by Aldridge-Brownhills MP Wendy Morton to reopen at least part of the Sutton Park line. In June 2022 it was announced that Transport for West Midlands had received £150,000 from the government's Restoring Your Railway program which will fund a business case into reopening the station and electrifying the line. At this time, it was stated that the single platform station could open in 2027.

Preceding station	Disused railways	Following station
Streetly; Line and station closed	Midland Railway; Sutton Park Line	Walsall; Line closed, station open
Streetly; Line and station closed	Midland Railway; Wolverhampton and Walsall Railway	North Walsall; Line and station closed
Terminus	Midland Railway; Aldridge to Brownhills Branch	Walsall Wood; Line and station closed
