= Geoff Edge =

British Labour Party politician

Geoffrey Edge (born 26 May 1943) is a former British Labour Party politician.

== Biography ==
Geoffrey Edge was born in West Bromwich. He was educated at the London School of Economics, from which he received a BA in Geography, and the University of Birmingham. He then became a university lecturer.

== Political career ==
Edge was elected member of parliament for the newly created constituency of Aldridge-Brownhills at the February 1974 general election with a majority of only 366 votes. He was re-elected in October 1974 with an increased majority, but lost the seat in 1979 to the Conservative candidate Richard Shepherd.

Whilst in parliament, Edge served as Parliamentary private secretary (PPS) for ministers in the Department for Education and the Privy Council Office.

After losing his seat, Edge served on West Midlands County Council, where he created an economic development department. For 25 years (1982–2007) he was chairman, later chairman and chief executive, of West Midlands Enterprise, which provided long term finance to local companies. He also served as a Labour councillor and Leader of Walsall Metropolitan Borough Council.

Edge stood unsuccessfully at the 1987 general election in Birmingham Yardley, but was beaten by the incumbent Conservative David Gilroy-Bevan.

== Other activities ==
Edge worked as a Senior Associate at P E International plc (1987–97) and also as an associate director of W S Atkins plc. He is currently (as of 2021) managing director of Geonomics Limited, a company he formed in 2007. The company website states that it is "a specialist regeneration, strategy and business consultancy".
