= Richard Leigh (poet) =

English metaphysical poet

Richard Leigh (1650–1728) was an English poet of gentry stock, whose work is classed as metaphysical poetry. He engaged in a pamphlet dispute with John Dryden.

== Life ==
He was the younger son of Sir Edward Leigh (1603–1671), of Rushall, Staffordshire (a scion of the ancient family of West Hall, High Legh, Cheshire and cousin of the Lords Leigh), and Elizabeth Talbot (died 1707), a relative of the Earls of Shrewsbury.

In 1666, aged 16, he entered Queen's College, Oxford. Sources rumour that after university, Leigh left Oxford for London and became an actor in the Duke of York's or King's Company. There were two other actors named "Leigh" during that period in the company, Anthony Leigh and John Leigh, but no records of a Richard Leigh in either company survive.

While he was a young man, Leigh wrote a prose tract attacking poet John Dryden (1631–1700), entitled "The Censure of the Rota on Mr. Dryden's Conquest of Granada", an attack which annoyed Dryden who subsequently called Leigh "the Fastidious Brisk of Oxford". Some of Leigh's works include "Poems on Several Occasions and to Several Persons", "Greatness in Little" (1675), "Sleeping on her Couch", and "The Eccho".

His will, dated 22 March 1726, was proved on 12 September 1728. He was buried in the Leigh Chapel at St Michael's Church, Rushall.

== Metaphysical poetry ==
Richard Leigh was among the English lyric poets of the 17th century known as the Metaphysicals. Though not all the poets of the school were aware of one another, most shared an interest in metaphysical matters.

Metaphysical is used in the sense of being based on abstract reasoning and transcending physical matter of the laws of nature. As a branch of philosophy, metaphysics concerns the first principles of things, including abstract concepts such as being and knowing. It is in these senses that it denotes the highly intellectual 17th-century English poets of the school, who are known for subtlety of thought and complex imagery.

Their work is marked by bold and ingenious conceits, complexity, and subtlety of thought, frequent use of paradox, and often deliberate harshness or rigidity of expression. Metaphysical poetry is chiefly concerned with analysing feeling. It blends emotion and intellectual ingenuity, characterized by conceit, i. e. by sometimes forced juxtaposition of apparently unconnected ideas and things, which startles the reader out of complacency and into the argument of the poem.

== Works by Richard Leigh ==
Leigh wrote "The Transposer Rehearsed, or the Fifth Act of Mr. Baye's Play; being a Post-script to the Animadversions on the Preface to Bishop Bramhall's Vindication" and an attacking pamphlet in 1673 entitled "A Censure of the Rota in Mr. Dryden's Conquest of Granada".

Leigh also published Poems upon Several Occasions and to Several Persons (1675), which includes the following:

The Whisper

Fairest, what means this close address,
As if you would a hearing steal?
Since words were given thoughts to express,
Why should soft words your thoughts conceal?

While thus your mind to breathe you teach
A language secret as your thought,
You sin against the end of speech,
Which when it hides to lie is taught.

The whispering air so soft does steal,
As conscious whom it must obey,
Your secret yielding to conceal,
Without the least sound slides away.

Unwilling to spread forth the news,
As dreading to displease the fair,
It does through secret pipes diffuse,
As loth to mix with common air.

Your words with silent motions glide,
As gently as from you they came;
From ways of noise they far divide,
And leave the road of common fame.

I'll hunt thee out where'er they bear,
And, breathing close, their steps pursue,
And, as I gather in the air,
Each breath shall voice the winds anew.

== See also ==
- Metaphysical poets
- Rushall, West Midlands

== Sources ==
- Saunders, Thomas Bailey (1892). "Leigh, Richard" . In Lee, Sidney (ed.). Dictionary of National Biography. Vol. 32. London: Smith, Elder & Co. p. 437.
- J.M. (September 1848). Urban, Sylvanus (ed.). "Retrospective Review: Poems upon seneral Occasions, and to several Persons. By the Author of the Censure of the Rota. 1675". The Gentleman's Magazine. London: 270–272.
- Saunders, T.B.; Moody, Joanna (reviewer) (2004). "Leigh Richard (1649/50-1728)". Oxford Dictionary of National Biography (online ed.). Oxford University Press. doi:10.1093/ref:odnb/16389. (Subscription, Wikipedia Library access or UK public library membership required.)
