= Christ Church, Blakenall Heath =

Anglican church in Walsall, West Midlands, England

Christ Church
- Christ Church, Blakenall Heath
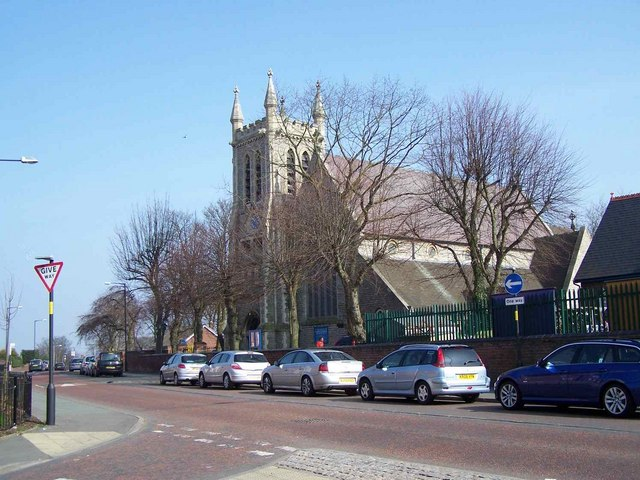
- Christ Church, Blakenall Heath
- Christ Church
- 52.614805°N 1.990812°W
- Location: Blakenall Heath, Walsall
- Country: England
- Denomination: Anglican

History
- Dedication: Jesus Christ

Architecture
- Functional status: Active
- Heritage designation: Grade II
- Designated: 31-Jul-1986
- Architectural type: Victorian/Pre-WWI
- Style: Victorian/Pre-WWI

Administration
- Province: Canterbury
- Diocese: Lichfield
- Deanery: Walsall

Christ Church is a grade-II listed church in the suburban village of Blakenall Heath, in the Metropolitan Borough of Walsall, in the county of the West Midlands, England. The church is located near the village centre. There is a nursery and a primary school associated with the church.
