= Goscote, Walsall =

Suburb of Bloxwich and Walsall in West Midlands, England

Coordinates: 52°36′50″N 1°58′33″W

Goscote
- Suburb
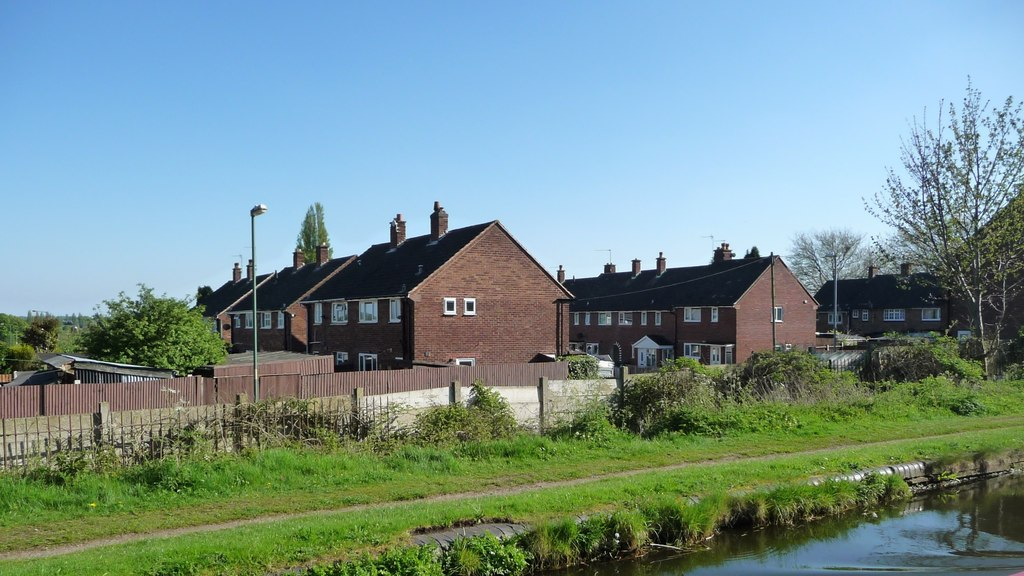
- Houses on Goscote Close in Goscote, Walsall

- Location within the West Midlands
- OS grid reference: SK015020
- Metropolitan borough: Walsall
- Metropolitan county: West Midlands
- Region: West Midlands
- Country: England
- Sovereign state: United Kingdom
- Post town: WALSALL
- Postcode district: WS3
- Dialling code: 01922
- Police: West Midlands
- Fire: West Midlands
- Ambulance: West Midlands
- UK Parliament: Walsall and Bloxwich

Goscote is a residential area of Walsall in the West Midlands of England. The Goscote name dates back several centuries and as recently as the 1920s it was a largely rural area that had survived the recent Industrial Revolution which dramatically altered the face of the region.

== Location ==
Goscote forms part of the Blakenall ward of Walsall, which also includes Blakenall Heath, Harden and Coal Pool.

== History ==
In the 1930s, Walsall council built around 400 houses and bungalows in Goscote Lane, Goscote Lodge Crescent, Hildicks Crescent, Middle Crescent and Hildicks Place. These were built to rehouse people from town centre slums. Smaller developments took place over the next four decades.

However, Goscote was in serious decline by the 1980s with high crime rates, unemployment and the deteriorating condition of the housing. Demand for housing in the area became low, leading to an increase in the number of empty properties. Arson attacks were also a frequent occurrence.

The Blakenall ward was earmarked for major regeneration from April 2001 as part of the government's New Deal initiative to regenerate some of the country's most deprived areas.

In May 2004, Walsall council unveiled plans to demolish nearly 900 homes in Blakenall Heath, Harden and Goscote, with the area around Goscote Lodge Crescent featuring on the shortlist of properties for possible demolition. These also included a large section of 1930s council housing around Harden and Blakenall Heath, although eventually some of the properties at risk of demolition were later retained.

In January 2007, the local council confirmed that it intended to demolish 281 interwar properties in Goscote Lodge Crescent, Hildicks Crescent and Middle Crescent and Hildicks Place. By this stage, several houses on the estate had already been demolished due to attacks by vandals and arsonists while they were empty. 103 of the 281 condemned houses were already empty. By April 2008, just over 20 families remained on the condemned estate, which the remaining residents were now comparing to war-torn Basra in Iraq due to an increase in arson, looting and vandalism. Some of the condemned properties had already been demolished by this stage, and within a year almost all of the estate had been demolished. The final resident left the estate in July 2011, enabling the demolition to be completed. Plans for 808 new homes on the estate were announced at the end of that year, with construction work to begin in 2018.

Planning permission was granted in late 2018 for the third and final phase of 407 new homes to be built in partnership between Walsall Housing Group and Keepmoat Housing. Work was underway within two years.

== Gallery ==
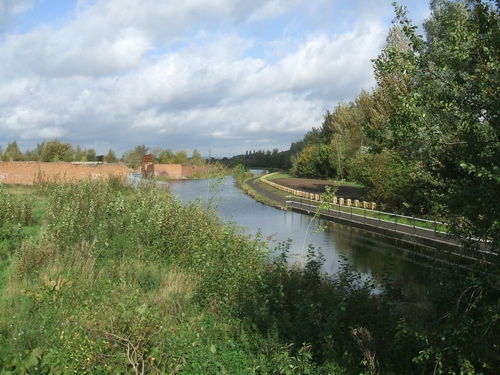
Landscaping to towpath at Goscote Valley

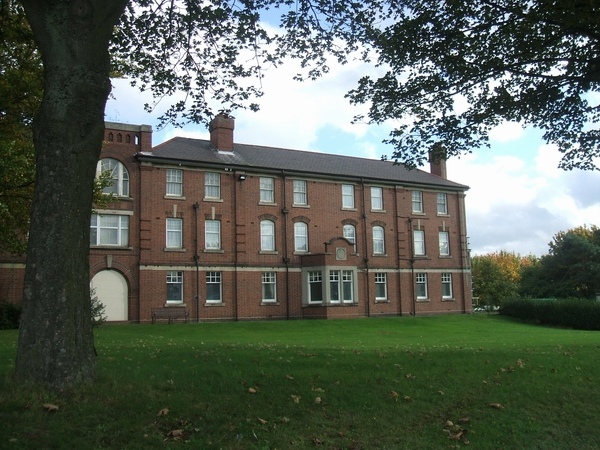
Goscote Hospital, former isolation hospital

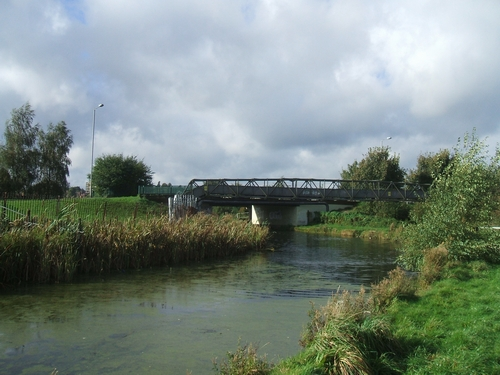
Hollands Bridge near Goscote
