= Walsall Wood railway station =

Former railway station in England

Walsall Wood

General information
- Location: Walsall Wood, Walsall; England
- Coordinates: 52.6280°N 1.9304°W
- Grid reference: SK047034
- Platforms: 2

Other information
- Status: Disused

History
- Pre-grouping: Midland Railway
- Post-grouping: London, Midland and Scottish Railway

Key dates
- 1 July 1884: Opened
- 31 March 1930: Closed
- 1962: Line closed
Location

Walsall Wood railway station was a station on the Midland Railway in England. It was opened in 1884, closed in March 1930 for passenger use.

The line from Walsall Wood to Brownhills Watling Street closed first in 1960 and the section from Walsall Wood to Aldridge closed in 1962. The station building was later demolished after falling into derelict condition.

The trackbed from Walsall Wood to Aldridge has since become a landfill site although the original road bridges near Coppice Road and Queen Street/Vigo Road are still in place and take the roads over the old trackbed. The section towards Brownhills Watling Street has become a housing estate. Oak Park also occupy sections of the old trackbed for leisure use and the original station is now a playground.

Preceding station	Disused railways	Following station
Aldridge; Line and station closed	Midland Railway; Aldridge to Brownhills Branch	Brownhills Watling Street; Line and station closed
