= Brownhills Watling Street railway station =

Disused railway station in England

Brownhills Watling Street

General information
- Location: Brownhills, Walsall; England
- Coordinates: 52.6534°N 1.9436°W
- Grid reference: SK039061
- Platforms: 2

Other information
- Status: Disused

History
- Pre-grouping: Midland Railway
- Post-grouping: London, Midland and Scottish Railway

Key dates
- 1 July 1884: Opened as Brownhills
- 2 June 1924: Renamed as Brownhills Watling Street
- 31 March 1930: Closed to passengers
- 1960: Line closed
Location

Brownhills Watling Street railway station was a station on the Midland Railway in England. It was opened in 1884, closed in March 1930 for passenger use and the track was closed in 1960.

It opened as simply Brownhills railway station, which was also the name of the other station within the town, which was operated by the London and North Western Railway on the South Staffordshire Line. The station was renamed in 1924.

The branch line that the station was situated on was planned to access the colliery traffic in the Cannock area and to link to the Cannock Chase and Wolverhampton Railway, and passenger traffic was a secondary consideration. The station was the terminus of passenger services on the line but freight traffic continued northwards to serve the collieries in the area.

The line to the north of the station is now in use as part of the Chasewater Railway.

Preceding station	Disused railways	Following station
Walsall Wood	Midland Railway; Aldridge to Brownhills Branch	Terminus
