= Wendy Morton =

British politician (born 1967)

The Right Honourable Wendy Morton MP
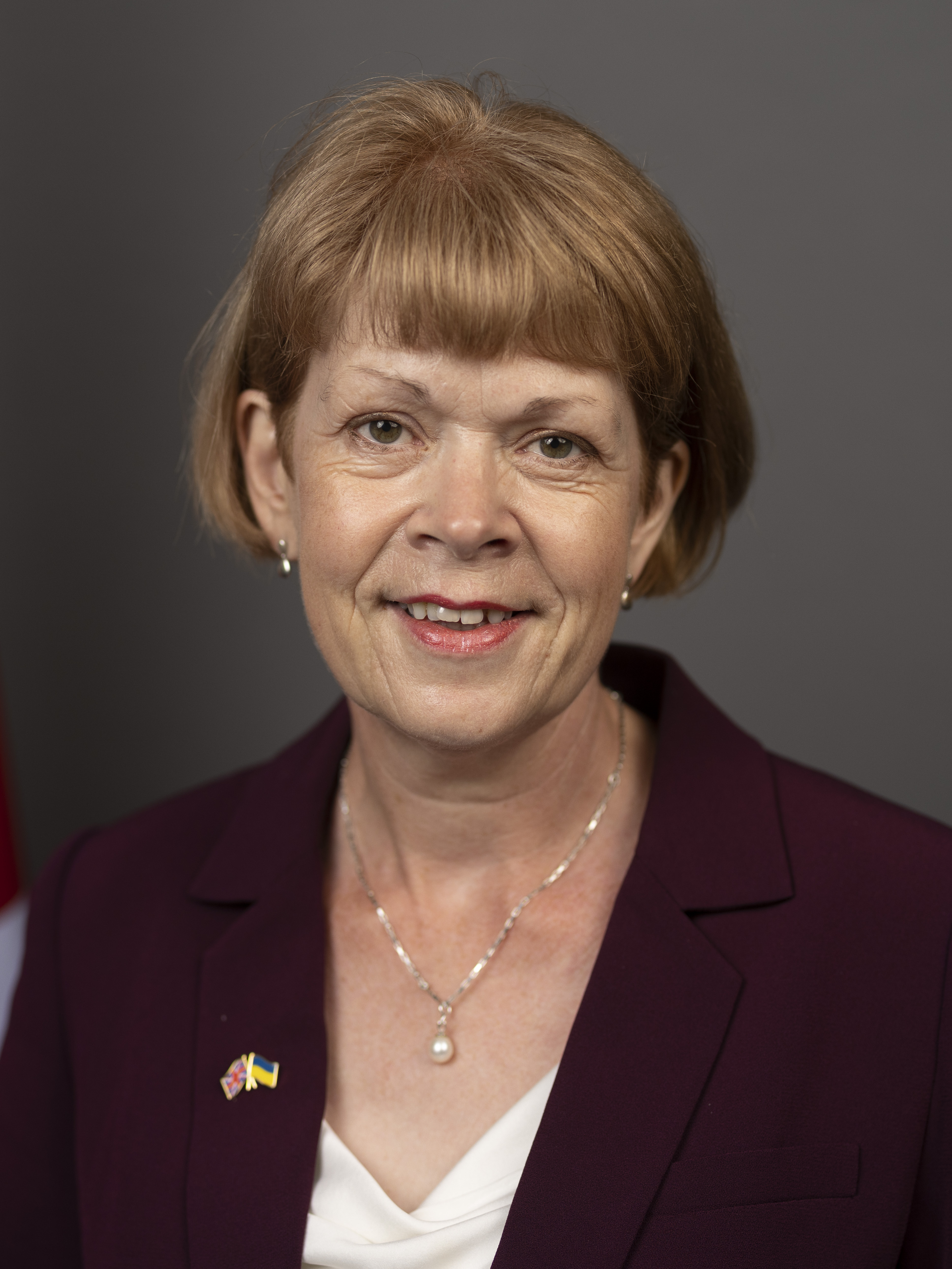
- Official portrait, 2022

Shadow Minister for Development
- Incumbent
- Assumed office 6 November 2024
- Leader: Kemi Badenoch
- Preceded by: Harriett Baldwin

Government Chief Whip in the House of Commons Parliamentary Secretary to the Treasury
- In office 6 September 2022 – 25 October 2022
- Prime Minister: Liz Truss
- Preceded by: Chris Heaton-Harris
- Succeeded by: Simon Hart

Minister of State for Transport (Note: Parliamentary Under-Secretary of State from December 2021 to February 2022)
- In office 19 December 2021 – 6 September 2022
- Prime Minister: Boris Johnson
- Preceded by: Chris Heaton-Harris
- Succeeded by: Kevin Foster

Parliamentary Under-Secretary of State for European Neighbourhood and the Americas
- In office 13 February 2020 – 19 December 2021
- Prime Minister: Boris Johnson
- Preceded by: Chris Pincher
- Succeeded by: Chris Heaton-Harris (Note: As Minister of State for Europe. James Cleverly assumed responsibility for North America and Vicky Ford assumed responsibility for Latin America and the Caribbean.)

Parliamentary Under-Secretary of State for Justice
- In office 26 July 2019 – 13 February 2020
- Prime Minister: Boris Johnson
- Preceded by: Paul Maynard
- Succeeded by: Alex Chalk

Assistant Government Whip
- In office 9 January 2018 – 26 July 2019
- Prime Minister: Theresa May

Member of Parliament for Aldridge-Brownhills
- Incumbent
- Assumed office 7 May 2015
- Preceded by: Richard Shepherd
- Majority: 4,231 (10.3%)

Personal details
- Born: 9 November 1967 (age 58) Northallerton, North Riding of Yorkshire, England
- Party: Conservative
- Education: Open University (MBA)
- Website: wendymorton.co.uk

Wendy Morton (born 9 November 1967) is a British politician and businesswoman who has been the Member of Parliament (MP) for Aldridge-Brownhills since 2015 and Shadow Minister for Development since November 2024. A member of the Conservative Party, she previously served as Government Chief Whip in the House of Commons and Parliamentary Secretary to the Treasury from September to October 2022.

Morton served as an Assistant Government Whip under Theresa May from 2018 to 2019. After Boris Johnson became Prime Minister in July 2019, Morton was appointed Parliamentary Under-Secretary of State for Justice. In the February 2020 reshuffle, she was appointed Parliamentary Under-Secretary of State for European Neighbourhood and the Americas. In December 2021, she was appointed Parliamentary Under-Secretary of State for Transport; she was promoted to Minister of State in February 2022.

Following Johnson's resignation in July 2022, Morton supported Liz Truss’s candidacy in the subsequent Conservative leadership election. Morton was chosen by Truss to serve as Chief Whip of the Conservative Party following her appointment as Prime Minister. However, Morton did not retain the position after Rishi Sunak succeeded Truss as Prime Minister in October 2022.

== Early life and career ==
Wendy Morton was born on 9 November 1967 in Northallerton. She was educated at The Wensleydale School, a comprehensive school in Leyburn. She later gained an MBA with the Open University.

Her career began as an executive officer in HM Diplomatic Service at the Foreign and Commonwealth Office between 1987 and 1989. She then worked in business, sales, and marketing. She set up an electronics company, with her husband, designing and manufacturing electronic goods for the agricultural industry.

== Parliamentary career ==
Morton stood as the Conservative candidate in Newcastle upon Tyne Central at the 2005 general election, coming third with 16% behind the incumbent Labour MP Jim Cousins and the Liberal Democrat candidate.

At the 2010 general election, Morton stood in Tynemouth, coming second with 34.4% of the vote behind the incumbent Labour MP Alan Campbell.

In October 2014, Morton attempted to be selected as the Conservative candidate for Richmond, but was defeated by Rishi Sunak, the future Prime Minister.

=== 1st term (2015–2017) ===
Morton was elected to Parliament as MP for Aldridge-Brownhills with 52% of the vote and a majority of 11,723.

Her first Private Members bill, NHS (Charitable Trusts, etc.) Bill, received Royal assent on 23 March 2016 and is now law. Her Second Private Member's Bill the Local Audit (Public Access to Documents) bill received Royal Assent on 27 April 2017.

Morton was opposed to Brexit prior to the 2016 referendum.

Morton supported Theresa May in the 2016 Conservative Party leadership election. In the summer of 2016, she was appointed a Parliamentary Private Secretary at the newly created Department for Business, Energy and Industrial Strategy.

=== 2nd term (2017–2019) ===
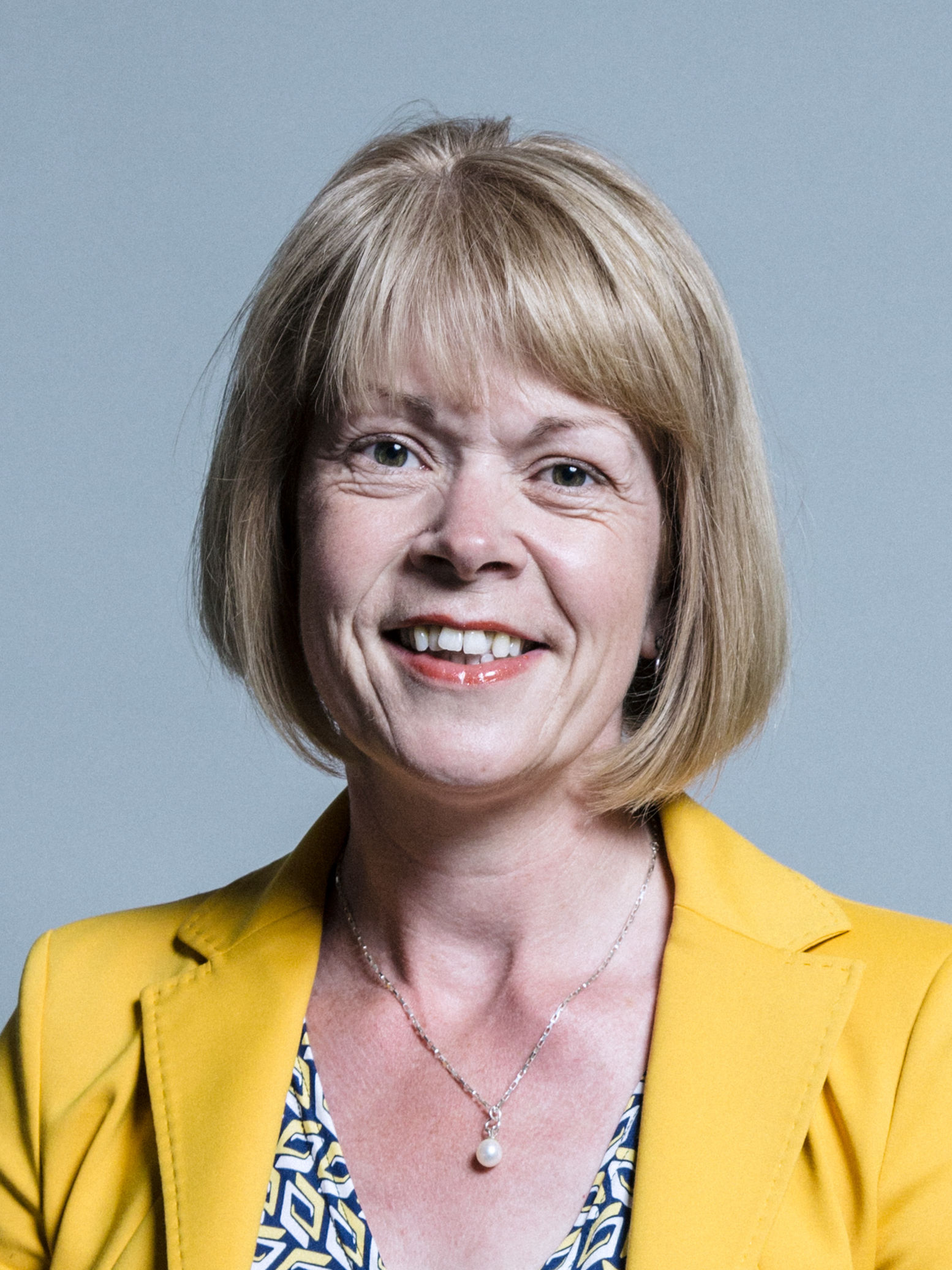
Morton in 2017

At the snap 2017 general election, Morton was re-elected as MP for Aldridge-Brownhills with an increased vote share of 65.4% and an increased majority of 14,307.

She was made an assistant government whip during the reshuffle on 9 January 2018.

After Boris Johnson won the 2019 Conservative Party leadership election, Morton said that Johnson would bring "real energy, vision and determination" to the role of Prime Minister and said: "Now he must get on and deliver Brexit, and importantly get it done by October 31".

She became a Parliamentary Under-Secretary of State for the Ministry of Justice in the Johnson ministry on 26 July 2019.

=== 3rd term (2019–2024) ===
Morton was again re-elected at the 2019 general election with an increased vote share of 70.8% and an increased majority of 27,850.

In February 2020 as Minister for Victims, Morton pledged an increase in government funding for rape support services.

In the 2020 cabinet reshuffle, Morton was promoted to Parliamentary Under-Secretary of State for European Neighbourhood and the Americas at the Foreign and Commonwealth Office. She was reshuffled to the Department for Transport on 19 December 2021, following the move of responsibility for the United Kingdom's relationship with the European Union to the Foreign, Commonwealth and Development Office, in a straight job-swap with Chris Heaton-Harris.

Morton endorsed Liz Truss during the July–September 2022 Conservative Party leadership election.

She was sworn in as a member of the Privy Council on 13 September 2022. The same day she was the recipient of alleged abusive texts from Gavin Williamson over his exclusion from the guest list of the funeral of Queen Elizabeth II at Westminster Abbey. During a further text exchange on 17 October, she wrote, "I need no lecture from you Gavin when I ask a civil question".

On 19 October 2022, during an ongoing political crisis, Morton was reported to have resigned as Chief Whip during a Commons vote and then un-resigned later that evening. She later confirmed that she had resigned, but Truss rejected her resignation and she instead continued as Chief Whip. On 24 October, Morton submitted a formal complaint to Conservative Campaign Headquarters over Williamson's text messages.

Morton resigned as Chief Whip shortly after the resignation of Truss as prime minister on 25 October 2022. On 26 October, following Williamson's promotion to Cabinet, Morton escalated her complaint by flagging and supplying the offending texts to the Cabinet Office's Proprietary and Ethics Team. Morton asked for anonymity but the text content was leaked to The Sunday Times and also appeared in The Daily Telegraph and Metro on 7 November 2022. On 8 November, Sky News reported that Morton has lodged a complaint with the Parliamentary watchdog, Independent Complaints and Grievance Scheme, regarding the content of the text messages that she had previously reported identical allegations to her party executive as abusive.

=== 4th term (2024–present) ===
At the 2024 general election, Morton was again re-elected, with a decreased vote share of 38.8% and a decreased majority of 4,231.

Morton stood in the election for Deputy Speaker in the House of Commons on 23 July 2024, but was defeated by her Conservative colleagues Nus Ghani and Caroline Nokes.

== Notes ==
Parliament of the United Kingdom
Preceded by Richard Shepherd	Member of Parliament for Aldridge-Brownhills; 2015–present	Incumbent
Political offices
Preceded by Chris Heaton-Harris	Government Chief Whip in the House of Commons; 2022	Succeeded by Simon Hart
Preceded by Chris Heaton-Harris	Parliamentary Secretary to the Treasury; 2022	Succeeded by Simon Hart
Party political offices
Preceded by Chris Heaton-Harris	Conservative Chief Whip in the House of Commons; 2022	Succeeded by Simon Hart
