= Richard Shepherd =

British politician (1942–2022)

Sir Richard Shepherd
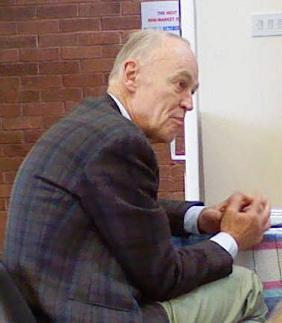
- At Silver Street Methodist Church in Brownhills, 2007

Member of Parliament for Aldridge-Brownhills
- In office 3 May 1979 – 30 March 2015
- Preceded by: Geoff Edge
- Succeeded by: Wendy Morton

Personal details
- Born: Richard Charles Scrimgeour Shepherd; 6 December 1942 Aberdeen, Scotland
- Died: 19 February 2022 (aged 79)
- Party: Conservative
- Education: London School of Economics (BSc); Johns Hopkins University (MS)
- Profession: Underwriter

Sir Richard Charles Scrimgeour Shepherd (6 December 1942 – 19 February 2022) was a British politician who was Member of Parliament for Aldridge-Brownhills from 1979 to 2015. A Eurosceptic, Shepherd was one of the Maastricht Rebels that had the whip withdrawn over opposition to Prime Minister John Major's legislation on the European Union. Shepherd was also a libertarian Conservative, and had a three line whip imposed against him by Margaret Thatcher when he introduced an amendment to loosen the Official Secrets Act 1911.

== Early life ==
Shepherd was born in Aberdeen, Scotland in 1942. His parents were Alfred Shepherd and his wife Davida (nee Wallace), both of whom worked in the commercial aviation industry. The family moved to London to be closer to Heathrow Airport and Shepherd was educated at Isleworth Grammar School (now Isleworth and Syon School). He then went to the London School of Economics where he received a BSc in Economics and where he studied with and became a friend of Robert Kilroy-Silk. He subsequently attended the Paul H. Nitze School of Advanced International Studies at Johns Hopkins University in the United States from which he graduated with an MSc which was also in Economics.

In the 1970s, Shepherd established the retail food businesses Partridges of Sloane Street and Shepherd Foods in London, operating both enterprises with his family. He was then an underwriter at Lloyd's of London from 1974 to 1994.

== Parliamentary career ==
Shepherd contested the open Conservative candidacy in Heston and Isleworth in 1970, but was not selected. He was chosen as the Conservative candidate for Nottingham East at the February 1974 general election, where he was defeated by the Labour Party candidate Jack Dunnett. During the 1970s he was also an assistant to Teddy Taylor.

Shepherd was elected Member of Parliament for Aldridge-Brownhills in 1979. The Spectator variously cited him as 'Backbencher of the Year' in 1987, 'Troublemaker of the Year' in 1989, and 'Parliamentarian of the Year' in 1995. He was rated as one of the ten most effective sitting MPs in 1989. In 2010, ConservativeHome listed him as one of the most rebellious Tory MPs.

One of the most significant events in Shepherd's parliamentary career came in 1988 when he introduced his Protection of Official Information Bill, which was to replace parts of the Official Secrets Act 1911, with intent to provide limited protection to some whistleblowers. The government introduced a three line whip which called on its MPs to vote against the bill, even though it was introduced by a member of their own party. This brought considerable debate at the time both in parliament and in the media. The bill was defeated. However Shepherd successfully introduced similar provisions into law in 1998.

Shepherd was one of the Maastricht Rebels, and is known to have had libertarian leanings. He developed close ties with fellow Maastricht rebels Nicholas Budgen and Christopher Gill, and gave the eulogy at Budgen's funeral.

Shepherd was a strong advocate of Parliament's power to hold the government to account. Shepherd stood to be Speaker of the House of Commons in 2000, and won 136 votes: the third-closest to defeating Michael Martin of eleven opponents. When Martin was forced to resign, in 2009, he stood for the position again. An outsider, at 14/1, he won only 15 votes, and was eliminated on the first ballot.

He voted against the Cameron–Clegg coalition government in 2013 on the issue of British military intervention in the Syrian civil war.

Shepherd was knighted in the 2013 New Year Honours for public service. He retired from Parliament at the 2015 general election.

== Personal life and death ==
Shepherd never married. He died on 19 February 2022 at the age of 79.

Parliament of the United Kingdom
Preceded by Geoff Edge	Member of Parliament for Aldridge-Brownhills; 1979–2015	Succeeded by Wendy Morton
