= Aldridge to Brownhills Branch =

The Aldridge to Brownhills Branch was a railway line opened by the Midland Railway in 1876 and completed in 1880, linking Aldridge with Brownhills Watling Street and the Cannock coal fields in Staffordshire as part of the Midland Railway branches around Walsall. The line was also linked to the South Staffordshire Line by a branch between Walsall Wood and Pelsall, Brownhills was also served by a station on the South Staffordshire line.

== Closure ==
The line was closed in stages, losing its passenger stations in 1930. The first section of the line to completely close was between Walsall Wood and Brownhills in 1960. The rest of the line was closed in 1962 and finally lifted in 1965 around the same time as the closure of Aldridge station on the Sutton Park Line. Very little remains of the branch or its stations today.
