= Blakenall Heath =

Settlement in West Midlands, England

Coordinates: 52.6141°N 1.9934°W

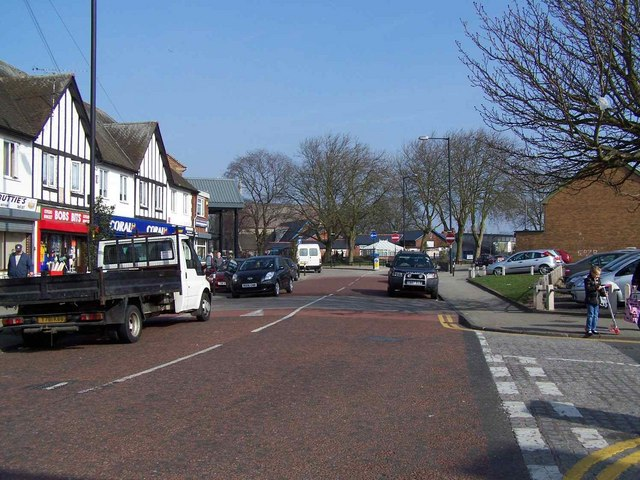
- Blakenall Lane, Blakenall Heath

- Location within the West Midlands
- Population: 12,022 (2011.Blakenall Ward)
- OS grid reference: SK004018
- Metropolitan borough: Walsall
- Metropolitan county: West Midlands
- Region: West Midlands
- Country: England
- Sovereign state: United Kingdom
- Post town: Walsall
- Postcode district: WS3
- Police: West Midlands
- Fire: West Midlands
- Ambulance: West Midlands
- UK Parliament: Walsall North

Blakenall Heath is a suburban village in the Metropolitan Borough of Walsall in the West Midlands County, England. Historically the village was a part of Staffordshire. It was originally a rural area between Walsall and Bloxwich with a small amount of private housing as recently as the beginning of the 20th century, but the area began to change dramatically after the end of the Great War.

Farmland gave way to council housing, which surrounded the local church and a few pre-1914 buildings, and further developments took place over the next few decades. Walsall borough's first council house was completed in Blakenall Heath, on Blakenall Lane, in June 1920. Within seven years, 500 council houses had been built in the area, and by 1939 around 2,000 new council houses had been built in the Blakenall Heath, Harden, Coal Pool and Goscote areas.

Several hundred more had followed by the 1970s, including three tower blocks of flats which were built in the late 1950s, as well as maisonettes in Walker Road which were built in the 1960s but quickly became unpopular with tenants as well as proving a magnet for crime, and were demolished in 1985.

The early council housing developments were divided between established neighbourhoods including Blakenall Lane and Harden Road, and new housing estates with themed street names; including the 1930s Poet's Estate at Harden (where road names included Shakespeare Crescent, Goldsmith Road and Tennyson Road) and the Green Rivers Estate at Blakenall Heath itself (where road names included Thames Road, Wye Road and Mersey Road) which was built in the 1940s and 1950s.

The Blakenall ward has traditionally had some of the highest poverty and crime rates in the Metropolitan Borough of Walsall. Unemployment in Blakenall peaked at around 25% in the early to mid 1980s.

Blakenall ward also includes neighbouring Harden, Goscote and Coal Pool, all of which were dominated by council housing built during the 1930s but have since seen demolition followed by the construction of new housing.

Between 2001 and 2006, some of the council housing around Blakenall Heath was demolished, including the whole of Taylor Avenue, the three late 1950s tower blocks, and large sections of Walker Road and Barracks Lane.

The parish church for Blakenall Heath is Christ Church, which is constructed from limestone and opened in 1872.

== Gallery ==
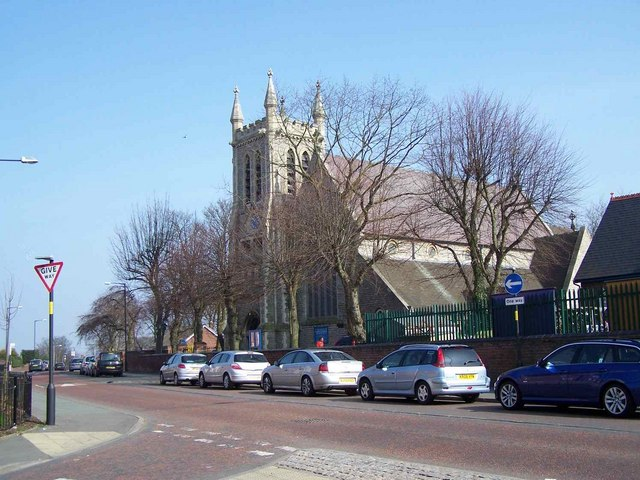
Christ Church

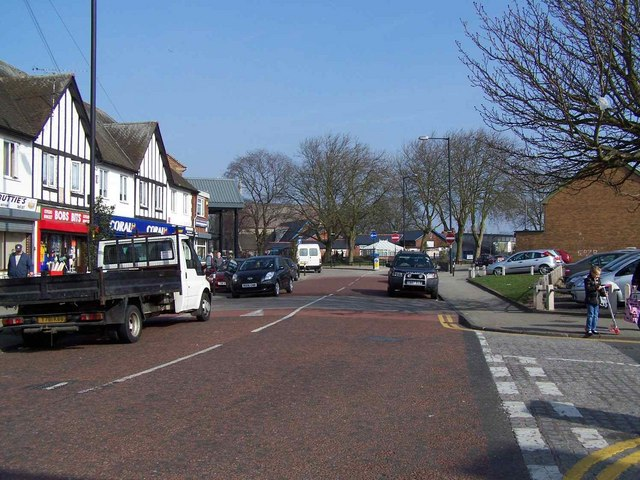
Blakenall Lane, Blakenall Heath

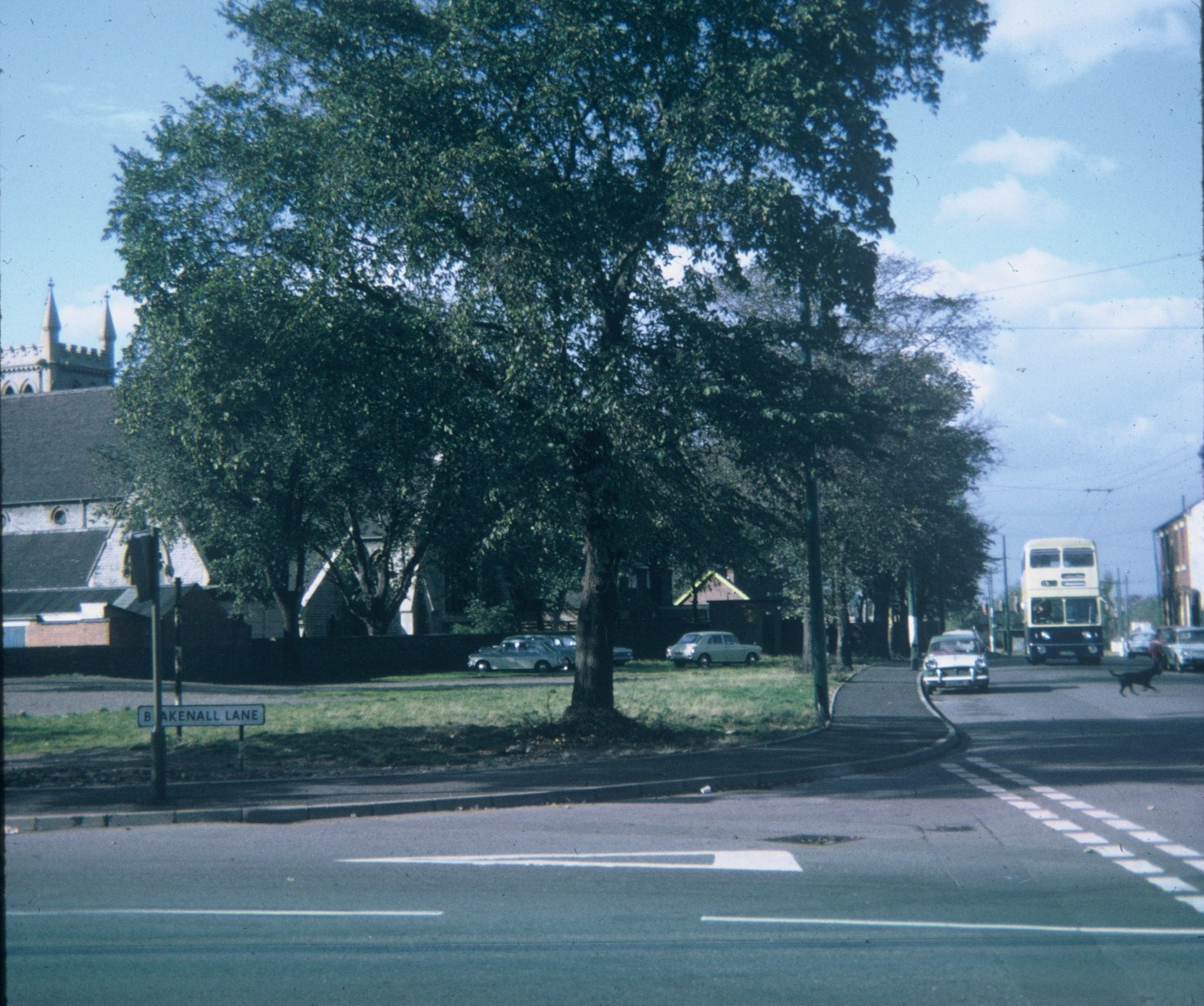
Blakenall Heath road junction in 1970
