= Pelsall railway station =

Former railway station in England

Pelsall
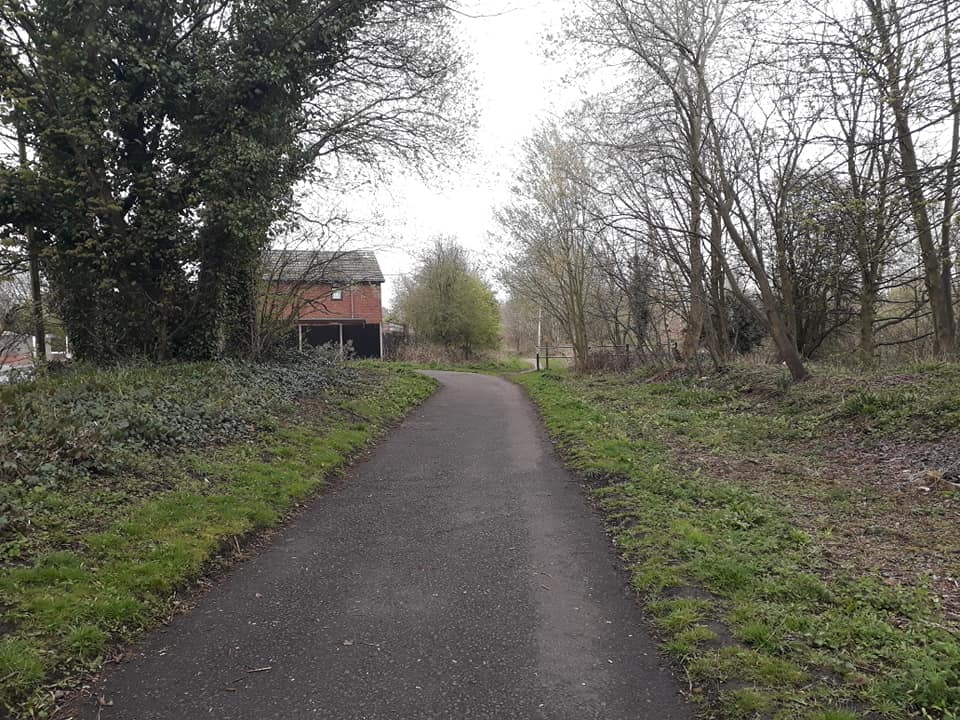
- Pelsall railway station site in 2018.

General information
- Location: Pelsall and Shelfield, Walsall; England
- Coordinates: 52.6253°N 1.9639°W
- Grid reference: SK025030
- Platforms: 2

Other information
- Status: Disused

History
- Original company: South Staffordshire Railway
- Pre-grouping: London and North Western Railway
- Post-grouping: London, Midland and Scottish Railway

Key dates
- 1849: Opened
- 10 August 1964: Closed to goods
- 18 January 1965: Closed to passengers
Location

Pelsall railway station is a disused railway station that served the villages of Pelsall and Shelfield in the Metropolitan Borough of Walsall, West Midlands, England. It was on the South Staffordshire Line between Walsall and Lichfield.

== History ==
It was opened in 1849. It closed as part of the Beeching Axe in 1965. The station was built and served by the South Staffordshire Railway, which later became London, Midland and Scottish Railway (through amalgamation of the London and North Western Railway).

The station also had a small single track leave after the station to serve the Atlas Brickworks and Leighswood Colliery until the 1930s when Leighswood Colliery closed but continued to serve Atlas Brickworks until 1964 when the small branch line closed.

The station closed in 1965 as part of the Beeching Cuts although the line that passed through the station remained open until 1984. It is preserved in case the railway line between Walsall and Lichfield reopens.

== Station site today ==
The trackbed through the former station site is now part of a footpath used by cyclists and dog walkers. In 2016, the bridge that carried the line to and from Walsall over Vicarage Road had a green fenced erected across both sides of the edges due to youths throwing stones and other rubbish at passing cars and people. Nothing remains of the station apart from parts of fencing on the Walsall platform and the former station masters house on Station Road to the immediate north.

| Preceding station | Disused railways | Following station |
|---|---|---|
| Brownhills | South Staffordshire Railway; Later LNWR, then LMS, finally BR; South Staffs Line (1849-1965) | Rushall |
