= Coal Pool =

Suburb of Bloxwich and Walsall in West Midlands, England

Coordinates: 52°36′11″N 1°58′27″W

Coalpool
- Suburb
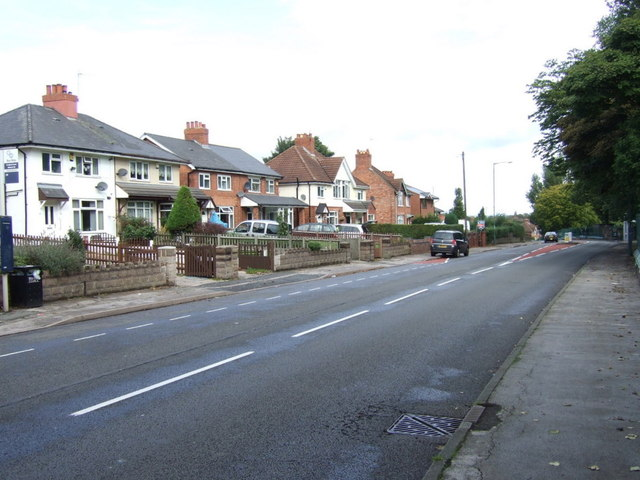
- Coalpool Lane, Coalpool, Walsall

- Location within the West Midlands
- OS grid reference: SK018005
- Metropolitan borough: Walsall
- Metropolitan county: West Midlands
- Region: West Midlands
- Country: England
- Sovereign state: United Kingdom
- Post town: WALSALL
- Postcode district: WS3
- Dialling code: 01922
- Police: West Midlands
- Fire: West Midlands
- Ambulance: West Midlands
- UK Parliament: Walsall and Bloxwich

Coalpool is an area and a housing estate in Walsall, West Midlands, England. Most of the homes in area were built by the local council during the 1930s, with a smaller development taking place in the late 1940s and 1950s which marked the resumption of council house building in the borough after World War II.

During World War II, an air raid on a house in Beddows Road on 14 November 1940 resulted in a 19-year-old Blakenall Heath man being seriously injured; he died in Walsall Manor Hospital shortly afterwards. This was the only civilian fatality during the Second World War.

Community facilities and housing have been improved and relatively little demolition has taken place around Coalpool, with the overwhelming majority of the properties being refurbished.
