= Aldridge-Brownhills =

UK Parliament constituency (since 1974)

Coordinates: 52.61°N 1.93°W

- Borough constituency for the House of Commons
- Boundaries since 2024
- Boundary of Aldridge-Brownhills in West Midlands region
- County: West Midlands
- Population: 76,974 (2011 census)
- Electorate: 73,122 (2023)
- Borough: Walsall
- Major settlements: Aldridge, Brownhills, Pelsall

Current constituency
- Created: 1974
- Member of Parliament: Wendy Morton (Conservative)
- Seats: One
- Created from: Walsall North and Walsall South

Aldridge-Brownhills (/ˈɔːldrɪdʒ ˈbraʊnhɪlz/ AWL-drij BROWN-hilz) is a constituency (Note: A borough constituency (for the purposes of election expenses and type of returning officer)) in the West Midlands, represented in the House of Commons of the UK Parliament. (Note: As with all constituencies, the constituency elects one Member of Parliament (MP) by the first past the post system of election at least every five years.) It has been represented since 2015 by Wendy Morton, a Conservative.

== Constituency profile ==
The constituency is located in the Metropolitan Borough of Walsall in the West Midlands and contains towns and villages on the outskirts of Walsall. This includes the towns of Aldridge and Brownhills and the villages of Pelsall, Shelfield, Rushall and Streetly.

The area has an industrial history, with coal mining and brick manufacturing traditionally providing much of the economic activity in Aldridge and Brownhills. Compared to the rest of the country, residents of the constituency are older than average, are less likely to be degree-educated and have an average level of wealth and deprivation. The area has a relatively low proportion of ethnic minorities; 85% of the constituency is white compared to 61% in the West Midlands county overall.

== History ==
Aldridge-Brownhills constituency was created in 1974 from parts of the former seats of Walsall North and Walsall South. It is one of four constituencies covering the Metropolitan Borough of Walsall. It covers the north-east and east of the borough. It was initially held by the Labour Party at the two 1974 general elections, when the constituency included most of Pheasey, a ward of the same name, then a stronger area for Labour than much of the rest, which was moved into Walsall South in 1983 to account for population expansion in the seat. Pheasey was moved back into the constituency for the 2024 general election.

The constituency has had just three MPs since its formation in February 1974. Geoff Edge of the Labour Party served the constituency from February 1974 until 1979, when it was gained by Richard Shepherd of the Conservative Party. Shepherd represented the constituency for thirty-six years, even withstanding the 1997 Labour landslide on a below average Conservative-to-Labour swing. In 2014, Sir Richard Shepherd announced he would not stand for re-election at the 2015 general election. Wendy Morton was selected to replace him as the Conservative candidate and secured the seat with a safe majority of 11,723 votes. This was increased over the next two elections and, in 2019, the majority was over 50%. Morton held onto the seat in the 2024 Labour landslide, but her majority was drastically reduced to 10.3%.

== Boundaries ==
Map of 2010–2024 boundaries

1974–1983: The Urban District of Aldridge-Brownhills.

1983–2010: The Metropolitan Borough of Walsall wards of Aldridge Central and South, Aldridge North and Walsall Wood, Brownhills, Hatherton Rushall, Pelsall, and Streetly.

2010–2024: The Metropolitan Borough of Walsall wards of Aldridge Central and South, Aldridge North and Walsall Wood, Brownhills, Pelsall, Rushall-Shelfield, and Streetly.

2024–present: Further to the 2023 Periodic Review of Westminster constituencies which came into effect for the 2024 general election, the constituency is composed of the following (as they existed on 1 December 2020):

- The Borough of Walsall wards of: Aldridge Central and South; Aldridge North and Walsall Wood; Brownhills; Paddock (polling districts UE and UF); Pelsall; Pheasey Park Farm; Rushall-Shelfield; Streetly

To bring the electorate within the permitted range, the seat was expanded to the south by transferring in the Pheasey Park Farm ward and part of the Paddock ward from the former constituency of Walsall South which was abolished in 2024.

== Members of Parliament ==
Election	Member	Party
Feb 1974	Geoff Edge	Labour
1979	Richard Shepherd	Conservative
2015	Wendy Morton	Conservative

== Elections ==
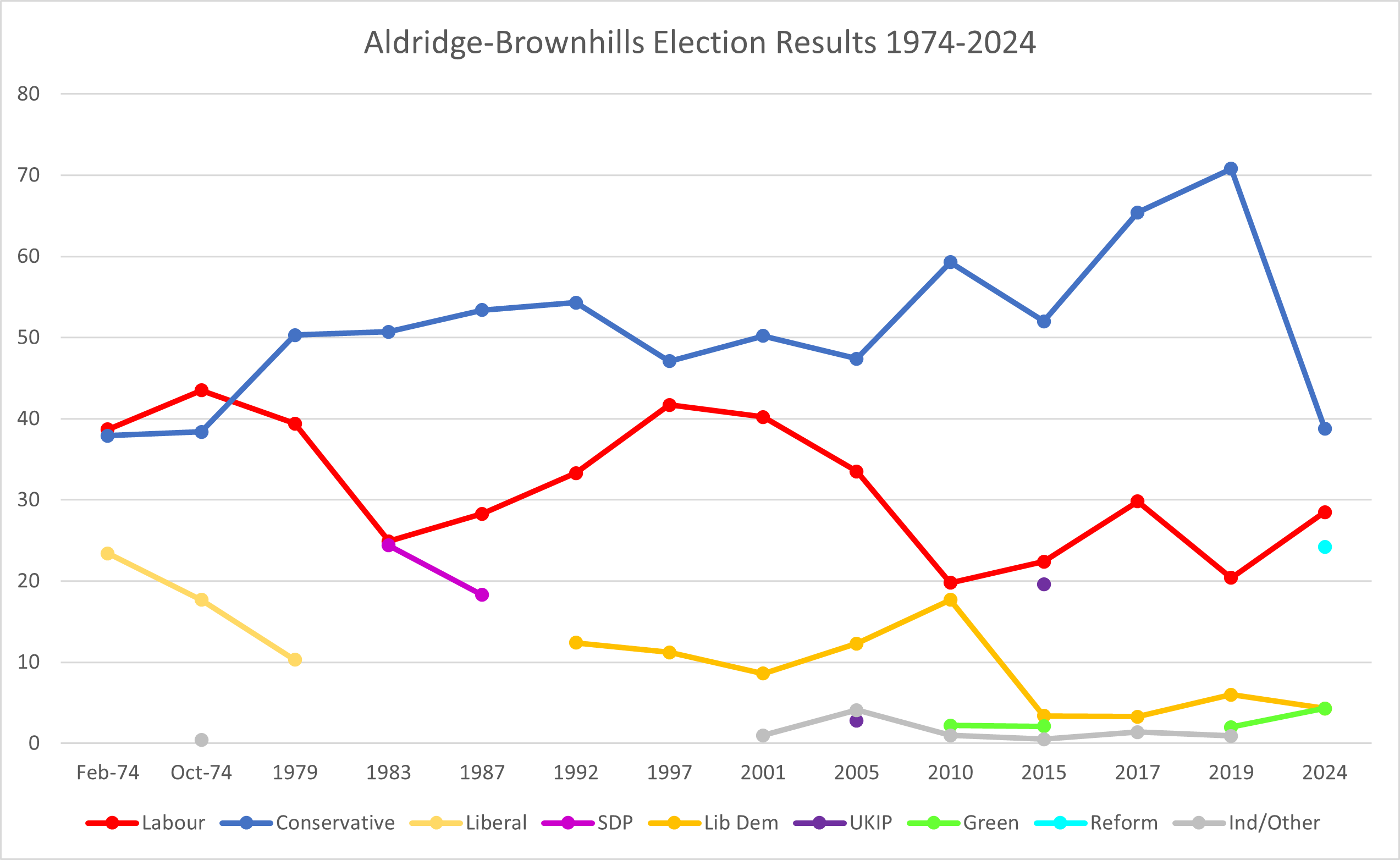
Aldridge-Brownhills Election Results 1974-2024

=== Elections in the 2020s ===
General election 2024: Aldridge-Brownhills
Party	Candidate	Votes	%	±%
Conservative	Wendy Morton	15,901	38.9	▼30.7
Labour	Luke Davies	11,607	28.4	▲6.9
Reform	Graham Eardley	9,903	24.2	▲23.5
Liberal Democrats	Ian Garrett	1,755	4.3	▼1.3
Green	Clare Nash	1,746	4.3	▲2.5
Majority		4,231	10.3	
Turnout		40,912	57.7	▼7.0
Registered electors		70,867		
Conservative hold		Swing	▼18.9	

=== Elections in the 2010s ===
2019 notional result
Party	Vote	%
Conservative	32,941	69.6
Labour	10,183	21.5
Liberal Democrats	2,654	5.6
Green Party	873	1.8
Official Monster Raving Loony Party	336	0.7
Brexit Party	334	0.7
Turnout	47,321	
Electorate	73,122	

General election 2019: Aldridge-Brownhills
Party	Candidate	Votes	%	±%
Conservative	Wendy Morton	27,850	70.8	▲5.4
Labour	David Morgan	8,014	20.4	▼9.4
Liberal Democrats	Ian Garrett	2,371	6.0	▲2.7
Green	Bill McComish	771	2.0	New
Monster Raving Loony	Mark Beech	336	0.9	▼0.5
Majority		19,836	50.4	▲14.8
Turnout		39,342	65.4	▼2.1
Registered electors		60,138		
Conservative hold		Swing	▲7.4	

General election 2017: Aldridge-Brownhills
Party	Candidate	Votes	%	±%
Conservative	Wendy Morton	26,317	65.4	▲13.4
Labour	John Fisher	12,010	29.8	▲7.4
Liberal Democrats	Ian Garrett	1,343	3.3	▼0.1
Monster Raving Loony	Mark Beech	565	1.4	▲0.9
Majority		14,307	35.6	▲6.0
Turnout		40,235	67.5	▲1.7
Registered electors		60,363		
Conservative hold		Swing	▲3.0	

General election 2015: Aldridge-Brownhills
Party	Candidate	Votes	%	±%
Conservative	Wendy Morton	20,558	52.0	▼7.3
Labour	John Fisher	8,835	22.4	▲2.6
UKIP	Anthony Thompson	7,751	19.6	New
Liberal Democrats	Ian Garrett	1,330	3.4	▼14.3
Green	Martyn Curzey	826	2.1	▼0.1
Monster Raving Loony	Mark Beech	197	0.5	New
Majority		11,723	29.6	▼9.9
Turnout		39,497	65.8	▲0.7
Registered electors		60,215		
Conservative hold		Swing	▼4.9	

General election 2010: Aldridge-Brownhills
Party	Candidate	Votes	%	±%
Conservative	Richard Shepherd	22,913	59.3	▲11.1
Labour	Ashiq Hussain	7,647	19.8	▼12.9
Liberal Democrats	Ian Jenkins	6,833	17.7	▲5.8
Green	Karl Macnaughton	847	2.2	New
Christian	Sue Gray	394	1.0	New
Majority		15,256	39.5	▲25.6
Turnout		38,644	65.1	▲1.6
Registered electors		58,909		
Conservative hold		Swing	▲12.0	

=== Elections in the 2000s ===
General election 2005: Aldridge-Brownhills
Party	Candidate	Votes	%	±%
Conservative	Richard Shepherd	18,744	47.4	▼2.8
Labour	John D. Phillips	13,237	33.5	▼6.7
Liberal Democrats	Roy M. Sheward	4,862	12.3	▲3.7
BNP	William R. Vaughan	1,620	4.1	New
UKIP	Graham Eardley	1,093	2.8	New
Majority		5,507	13.9	▲3.9
Turnout		39,556	64.0	▲3.4
Registered electors		61,289		
Conservative hold		Swing	▲2.0	

General election 2001: Aldridge-Brownhills
Party	Candidate	Votes	%	±%
Conservative	Richard Shepherd	18,974	50.2	▲3.1
Labour	Ian D. Geary	15,206	40.2	▼1.5
Liberal Democrats	Monica Howes	3,251	8.6	▼2.6
Socialist Alliance	John D. Rothery	379	1.0	New
Majority		3,768	10.0	▲4.6
Turnout		37,810	60.6	▼13.7
Registered electors		62,361		
Conservative hold		Swing	▲2.3	

=== Elections in the 1990s ===
General election 1997: Aldridge-Brownhills
Party	Candidate	Votes	%	±%
Conservative	Richard Shepherd	21,856	47.1	▼7.2
Labour	Janos Toth	19,330	41.7	▲8.4
Liberal Democrats	Celia M. Downie	5,184	11.2	▼1.2
Majority		2,526	5.4	▼15.6
Turnout		46,370	74.3	▼8.3
Registered electors		62,441		
Conservative hold		Swing	▼7.8	

General election 1992: Aldridge-Brownhills
Party	Candidate	Votes	%	±%
Conservative	Richard Shepherd	28,431	54.3	▲0.9
Labour	Neil E. Fawcett	17,407	33.3	▲5.0
Liberal Democrats	Stewart Reynolds	6,503	12.4	▼5.9
Majority		11,024	21.0	▼3.9
Turnout		52,341	82.6	▲2.8
Registered electors		63,404		
Conservative hold		Swing	▼2.0	

=== Elections in the 1980s ===
General election 1987: Aldridge-Brownhills
Party	Candidate	Votes	%	±%
Conservative	Richard Shepherd	26,434	53.4	▲2.7
Labour	Clive Duncan	14,038	28.3	▲3.4
SDP	Glynn Betteridge	9,084	18.3	▼6.1
Majority		12,936	25.1	▼0.7
Turnout		49,556	79.8	▲1.5
Registered electors		62,129		
Conservative hold		Swing	▼0.4	

General election 1983: Aldridge-Brownhills
Party	Candidate	Votes	%	±%
Conservative	Richard Shepherd	24,148	50.7	▲0.4
Labour	Ray Burford	11,864	24.9	▼14.5
SDP	Peter Gunn	11,599	24.4	New
Majority		12,284	25.8	▲14.9
Turnout		47,611	78.3	▼4.2
Registered electors		60,803		
Conservative hold		Swing	▲7.45	

=== Elections in the 1970s ===
General election 1979: Aldridge-Brownhills
Party	Candidate	Votes	%	±%
Conservative	Richard Shepherd	26,289	50.3	▲11.9
Labour	Geoff Edge	20,621	39.4	▼4.1
Liberal	John Aldridge	5,398	10.3	▼7.4
Majority		5,668	10.9	▲5.8
Turnout		52,308	82.5	▲2.8
Registered electors		63,377		
Conservative gain from Labour		Swing	▲8.0	

General election October 1974: Aldridge-Brownhills
Party	Candidate	Votes	%	±%
Labour	Geoff Edge	21,403	43.5	▲4.8
Conservative	A.J.M. Teacher	18,884	38.4	▲0.5
Liberal	Dr John A. Crofton	8,693	17.7	▼5.7
More Prosperous Britain	Tom Keen	210	0.4	New
Majority		2,519	5.1	▲4.3
Turnout		49,190	79.7	▼3.5
Registered electors		61,731		
Labour hold		Swing	▲2.2	

General election February 1974: Aldridge-Brownhills
Party	Candidate	Votes	%	±%
Labour	Geoff Edge	19,642	38.7	
Conservative	Patricia Hornsby-Smith	19,276	37.9	
Liberal	Dr John A. Crofton	11,883	23.4	
Majority		366	0.8	
Turnout		50,801	83.2	
Registered electors		61,028		
Labour win (new seat)				

== See also ==
- List of parliamentary constituencies in the West Midlands (county)
- List of parliamentary constituencies in West Midlands (region)
