= WS postcode area =

Postcode area within the United Kingdom

Walsall
- Postcode area
- Coordinates: 52.648°N 1.955°W
- Country: United Kingdom
- Postcode area: WS
- Postcode area name: Walsall
- Post towns: 6
- Postcode districts: 15
- Postcode sectors: 67
- Postcodes (live): 10,089
- Postcodes (total): 14,838
- Statistics as at May 2020

The WS postcode area, is the West Staffordshire postcode also known as the Walsall postcode area, is a group of fifteen postcode districts in England, within six post towns. These cover the northern part of the West Midlands (including Walsall and Wednesbury) and much of south-east Staffordshire (including Lichfield, Cannock, Burntwood and Rugeley).

== Coverage ==
The approximate coverage of the postcode districts:

Postcode district	Post town	Coverage	Local authority area(s)
WS1	WALSALL	Walsall town centre, Caldmore	Walsall
WS2	WALSALL	Pleck, Bentley, Leamore	Walsall
WS3	WALSALL	Bloxwich, Coal Pool, Pelsall	Walsall
WS4	WALSALL	Rushall	Walsall
WS5	WALSALL	Bescot, Tamebridge, Yew Tree	Walsall, Sandwell
WS6	WALSALL	Cheslyn Hay, Great Wyrley	South Staffordshire
WS7	BURNTWOOD	Burntwood	Lichfield
WS8	WALSALL	Brownhills, Walsall Wood (north)	Walsall
WS9	WALSALL	Aldridge, Walsall Wood (south), Stonnall	Walsall, Lichfield
WS10	WEDNESBURY	Wednesbury, Darlaston	Sandwell, Walsall
WS11	CANNOCK	Cannock, Norton Canes, Hatherton	Cannock Chase, South Staffordshire
WS12	CANNOCK	Hednesford, Heath Hayes, Wimblebury, Huntington	Cannock Chase, South Staffordshire
WS13	LICHFIELD	Lichfield (north and city centre), Fradley, Streethay, Croxall, Farewell, Chorley	Lichfield
WS14	LICHFIELD	Lichfield (south), Shenstone, Whittington, Wall, Weeford	Lichfield
WS15	RUGELEY	Rugeley, Brereton, Armitage, Handsacre, Abbots Bromley, Longdon, Mavesyn Ridware, Hill Ridware, Blithbury, Colton, Cannock Wood, Gentleshaw, Hamstall Ridware, Admaston	Cannock Chase, Lichfield, East Staffordshire

== Map ==
WS postcode area map, showing postcode districts in red and post towns in grey text, with links to nearby B, DE, DY, ST and WV postcode areas.

== See also ==
- Postcode Address File
- List of postcode areas in the United Kingdom
