= Ernest Herbert Pitcher =

Recipient of the Victoria Cross

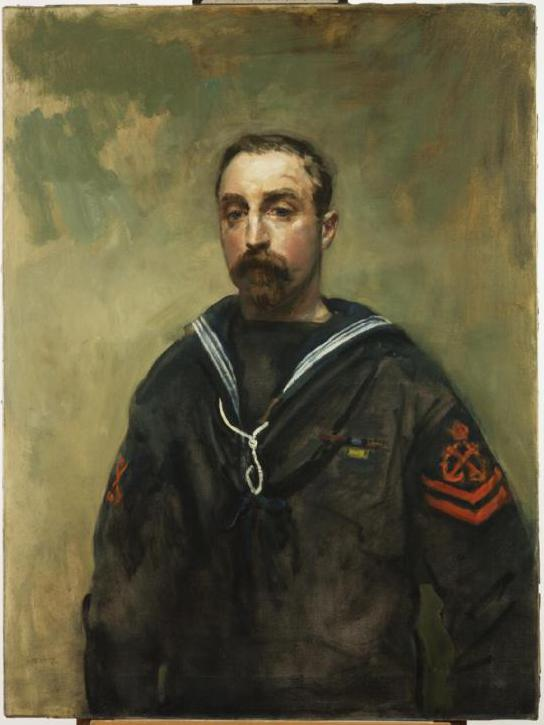
- Petty Officer E Pitcher VC, 1918 by Ambrose McEvoy.
- Born: 31 December 1887; Mullion, Cornwall, England
- Died: 10 February 1946 (aged 58); Sherborne, Dorset, England
- Burial place: Northbrook Cemetery, Swanage, Dorset, England
- Military career
- Allegiance: United Kingdom
- Branch: Royal Navy
- Rank: Chief Petty Officer
- Units: HMS Dunraven
- Conflicts: First World War; Second World War
- Awards: Victoria Cross; Distinguished Service Medal; Croix de Guerre (France); Médaille Militaire (France)

Chief Petty Officer Ernest Herbert Pitcher VC, DSM (31 December 1887 − 10 February 1946) (middle name also recorded as James) was a Royal Navy sailor and an English recipient of the Victoria Cross, the highest award for gallantry in the face of the enemy that can be awarded to British and Commonwealth forces.

== Naval career ==
During the First World War Pitcher served in Q ships commanded by Captain Gordon Campbell. The first was HMS Farnborough (Q.5) which sank two U-boats but was herself sunk by the second; Captain Campbell was awarded the Victoria Cross (VC) after the second action. Most of the crew, including Pitcher, were rescued and followed Campbell to HMS Pargust.

Pargust sank the U-boat UC-29 but was herself severely damaged. The Admiralty decided that Pargust's action was worthy of the VC but that all of the crew had acted with equal valour, so article 13 of the VC's royal warrant was applied and the ship's company voted for one commissioned officer and one petty officer or seaman to receive the award: these were Pargust's first lieutenant, Ronald Stuart, and seaman William Williams. Pitcher received the Distinguished Service Medal. Campbell and the crew then transferred to HMS Dunraven, in which the action took place for which Pitcher was awarded the VC.

On the 8th August, 1917, H.M.S. "Dunraven," under the command of Captain Gordon Campbell, V.C., D.S.O., R.N., sighted an enemy submarine [UC-71] on the horizon. In her role of armed British merchant ship, the "Dunraven" continued her zig-zag course, whereupon the submarine closed, remaining submerged to within 5,000 yards, and then, rising to the surface, opened fire. The "Dunraven" returned the fire with her merchant ship gun, at the same time reducing speed to enable the enemy to overtake her. Wireless signals were also sent out for the benefit of the submarine: "Help! come quickly – submarine chasing and shelling me." Finally, when the shells began falling close, the "Dunraven" stopped and abandoned ship by the "panic party." [The "panic party" was a small number of men who were to "abandon ship" during an attack to continue the impersonation of a merchant ship.] The ship was then being heavily shelled, and on fire aft. In the meantime the submarine closed to 400 yards distant, partly obscured from view by the dense clouds of smoke issuing1 from the "Dunraven's" stern. Despite the knowledge that the after magazine must inevitably explode if he waited, and further, that a gun and gun's crew lay concealed over the magazine, Captain Campbell decided to reserve his fire until the submarine had passed clear of the smoke. A moment later, however, a heavy explosion occurred aft, blowing the gun and gun's crew into the air, and accidentally starting the fire-gongs at the remaining gun positions; screens were immediately dropped, and the only gun that would bear opened fire, but the submarine, apparently frightened by the explosion, had already commenced to submerge. Realising that a torpedo must inevitably follow, Captain Campbell ordered the surgeon to remove all wounded and conceal them in cabins; hoses were also turned on the poop, which was a mass of flames. A signal was sent out warning men-of-war to divert all traffic below the horizon in order that nothing should interrupt the final phase of the action. Twenty minutes later a torpedo again struck the ship abaft the engine-room. An additional party of men were again sent away as a "panic party," and left the ship to outward appearances completely abandoned, with the White Ensign flying and guns unmasked. For the succeeding fifty minutes the submarine examined the ship through her periscope. During this period boxes of cordite and shells exploded every few minutes, and the fire on the poop still blazed furiously. Captain Campbell and the handful of officers and men who remained on board lay hidden during this ordeal. The submarine then rose to the surface astern, where no guns could bear and shelled the ship closely for twenty minutes. The enemy then submerged and steamed past the ship 150 yards off, examining her through the periscope. Captain Campbell decided then to fire one of his torpedoes, but missed by a few inches. The submarine crossed the bows and came slowly down the other side, whereupon a second torpedo was fired and missed again. The enemy observed it and immediately submerged. Urgent signals for assistance were immediately sent out, but pending arrival of assistance Captain Campbell arranged for a third "panic party" to jump overboard if necessary and leave one gun's crew on board for a final attempt to destroy the enemy, should he again attack. Almost immediately afterwards, however, British and American destroyers arrived on the scene, the wounded were transferred, boats were recalled and the fire extinguished. The "Dunraven" although her stern was awash, was taken in tow, but the weather grew worse, and early the following morning she sank with colours flying.

Petty Officer Pitcher was captain of the 4-inch gun crew. When the magazine below them blew up the crew were blown into the air, but Pitcher and another man landed on mock railway trucks made of wood and canvas, which cushioned their falls and saved their lives. His VC was awarded by ballot of the gun crew. Lieutenant Charles George Bonner was also awarded the VC. Pitcher also received the Croix de Guerre and the Médaille Militaire.

== Interbellum and later life ==
In 1920 Pitcher was promoted to chief petty officer. In 1927 he retired from the Royal Navy and lived in Dorset, where he taught woodwork in a boys' school in Swanage and also ran a pub, the "Royal Oak" in Herston. On the outbreak of the Second World War he rejoined the Navy and served onshore in the south of England. After the war his health deteriorated and he died of tuberculosis on 10 February 1946. His body was brought back to Swanage, where he is buried in Northbrook Cemetery.
