= HMS Pargust =

History

United Kingdom
- Name: Pargust
- Launched: 10 June 1907
- Commissioned: 28 March 1917
- In service: 1917-1918
- Fate: Decommissioned November 1918
- Notes: Converted to Q-Ship at Devonport

General characteristics
- Type: collier
- Tonnage: 2,817 GRT
- Propulsion: steam
- Speed: 7 ½ knots
- Armament: 1 × 4 in, 4 × 12-pounder naval guns, 2 × 14 in torpedo tubes

HMS Pargust was a Royal Navy warship that was active during World War I. She was a Special Service Vessel (also known as Q-ships) used by the RN in anti-submarine warfare. Pargust was active in this role during the last two years of the war, and was successful on one occasion, destroying the U-boat UC-29.

== Early career ==
Pargust was built in 1907 as a collier, and was originally named Vittoria. She had an uneventful peacetime career before the start of World War I. In 1917 she was requisitioned by the Royal Navy for conversion into a special service vessel. She was taken in hand at Cardiff, and converted for her new role at the Devonport naval base. The collier was armed with five guns, a 4-inch gun and four 12-pounder naval guns, and two torpedo tubes, all in concealed mountings. She was also fitted with a gun in plain sight; as many merchant ships were defensively armed by this stage of the war, Pargust would have looked suspicious without it. Q ship crews of this period had evolved the strategy of giving a half-hearted defence before abandoning ship thus reinforcing the impression they were just helpless merchantmen. She was manned with a volunteer crew and commanded by Commander Gordon Campbell, who transferred with his crew from Farnborough, another Q ship. She was renamed Pargust and commissioned on 28 March 1917.

== Service history ==
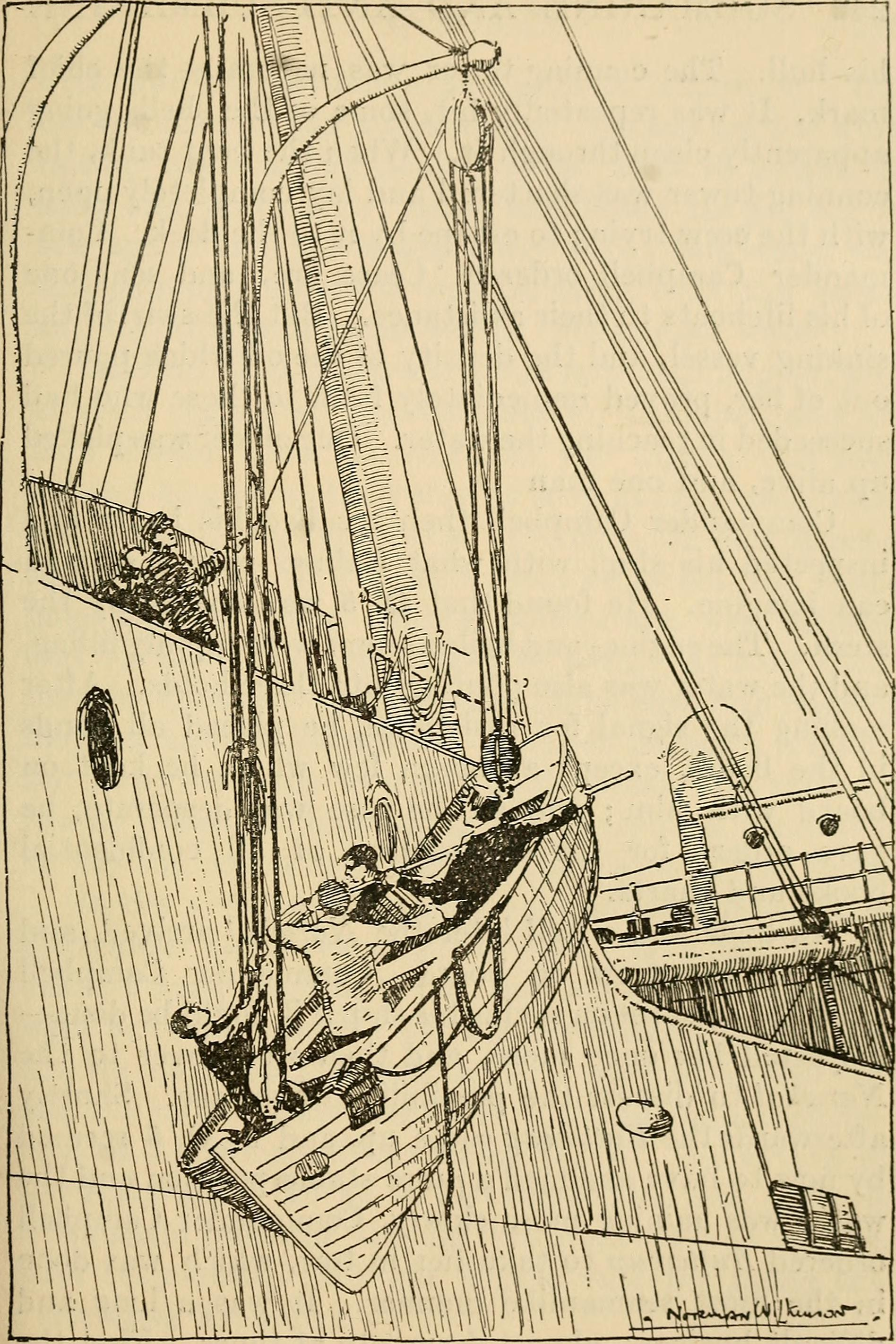
A fourth boat was partially lowered (by the Pargust) with a proper amount of confusion (to fool UC-29)

Pargust was assigned to special service duty and based at Queenstown, in Ireland and was active on anti-submarine duties in the Southwest Approaches.

On 7 June 1917 Pargust was on patrol west of Valentia Island when she encountered UC-29, which had already sunk three ships in the area. As Pargust approached the U-boat’s position UC 29 fired a torpedo which hit Pargust in the engine room. Campbell made no attempt to avoid this, as he was convinced the only way to allay the suspicions of a U-boat was to allow his ship to be torpedoed, relying on her buoyant cargo to keep her afloat, and obliging the U-boat to surface to finish her off with gun-fire at which point it would be vulnerable to his guns. He had already employed this strategy with Farnborough, and would do so again, in one of the epic Q-ship actions, with Dunraven.

Pargust was hit at 8 am; shortly after Campbell ordered his panic party out, a group masquerading as the merchant crew who abandoned ship in simulated disorder, to further convince the U-boat that it was safe to approach. The U-boat closed in at periscope depth, then circled Pargust and her boats in order to inspect her for any signs of concealed weapons. The U-boat then broke surface, intending to interrogate the boat crew, but the boat pulled away, around the steamer's stern, in order to bring the U–boat closer. This was successful, and at 8.36am, when UC-29 was just 50 yards away, Campbell opened fire. Pargust's gunners scored numerous hits on the U-boat, damaging the conning tower particularly, and the crew started to abandon ship, raising their hands in surrender. Campbell ordered cease-fire, at which UC-29 started to move away on the surface, into the surrounding mist. At this, and to prevent the U-boat escaping (Pargust was immobilised, and unable to pursue) Campbell commenced firing again, which continued until 8.40 am when UC-29 blew up and sank. Just two of her crew were saved.

Pargust remained afloat, and was joined by the sloops HMS Crocus and Zinnia, and the American destroyer USS Cushing. Pargust's crew were transferred to Zinnia, and she was taken under tow; she was brought safely to Queenstown the following day.

== Later career ==
Pargust was moved to Devonport, for extensive repairs; she was still under repair in October 1917 when she was transferred to the US Navy. The USN was keen to take part in the anti-submarine special service operations, and had requested two Q-ships to be manned by US personnel. However Pargust's damage was more extensive than had been expected, and she not ready in time for operations with the Americans, so was returned to RN control.

In May 1918, and now renamed Pangloss, she was transferred to Gibraltar. She joined a special service force based there for patrol work in the mid-Atlantic, where German "U-cruisers" were operating, and in the western Mediterranean. However she saw no further action before the war ended in November 1918.

After this she was de-commissioned and returned to civilian service. As SS Johann Faulbaum she was sunk by RAF aircraft near Kirkenes on 13 May 1944.

== See also ==
- Ronald Neil Stuart VC
- William Williams VC
