= HMS Peyton =

British M-Class destroyer, WW1

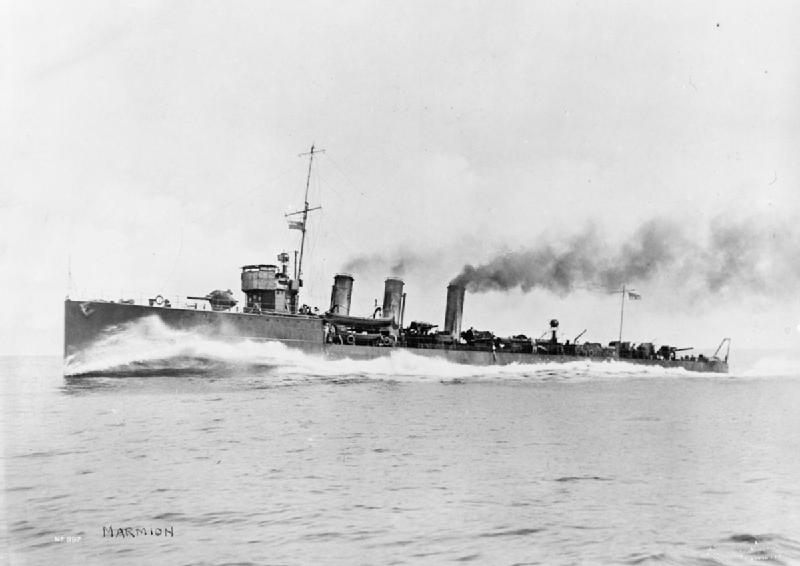
- Sister ship HMS Marmion

History

United Kingdom
- Name: HMS Peyton
- Namesake: John Peyton
- Ordered: May 1915
- Builder: William Denny and Brothers, Dumbarton
- Yard number: 1053
- Laid down: 12 July 1915
- Launched: 2 May 1916
- Completed: 29 June 1916
- Fate: Sold to be broken up 9 May 1921

General characteristics
- Class & type: Admiralty M-class destroyer
- Displacement: 994 long tons (1,010 t) normal; 1,021 long tons (1,037 t) full load
- Length: 265 ft (80.8 m)
- Beam: 26 ft 8 in (8.1 m)
- Draught: 9 ft 3 in (2.82 m)
- Propulsion: 3 Yarrow boilers; 2 Parsons steam turbines, 25,000 shp (19,000 kW)
- Speed: 34 knots (63.0 km/h; 39.1 mph)
- Range: 3,450 nmi (6,390 km; 3,970 mi) at 15 kn (28 km/h; 17 mph)
- Complement: 76
- Armament: 3 × QF 4 in (102 mm) Mark IV guns (3×1); 1 × single 2-pounder (40 mm) "pom-pom" Mk. II anti-aircraft gun (1×1); 4 × 21 in (533 mm) torpedo tubes (2×2)

HMS Peyton was a Admiralty M-class destroyer which served with the Royal Navy during the First World War. The M class were an improvement on the preceding L class, capable of higher speed. Launched on 2 May 1916, the vessel served in anti-submarine and escort duties based at Cobh in Ireland. The destroyer attacked the German submarine SM UB-23 and rescued crews from friendly merchant ships that had been sunk. After the end of the war, Peyton was placed in reserve and subsequently broken up on 9 May 1921.

== Design and development ==
Peyton was one of sixteen Admiralty M-class destroyers ordered by the British Admiralty in May 1915 as part of the Fifth War Construction Programme. The M-class was an improved version of the earlier L-class destroyer destroyers, designed to reach a higher speed in order to counter rumoured German fast destroyers, although it later transpired the German capability had been overstated.

The destroyer was 265 feet (80.77 m) long overall, with a beam of 26 feet 8 inches (8.13 m) and a draught of 9 feet 3 inches (2.82 m). Displacement was 994 long tons (1,010 t) normal and 1,021 long tons (1,037 t) full load. Power was provided by three Yarrow boilers feeding two Parsons steam turbines rated at 25,000 shaft horsepower (19,000 kW) and driving two shafts, to give a design speed of 34 knots (63 km/h; 39 mph). Three funnels were fitted. 296 long tons (301 t) of oil were carried, giving a design range of 3,450 nautical miles (6,390 km; 3,970 mi) at 15 knots (28 km/h; 17 mph).

Armament consisted of three 4-inch (102 mm) Mk IV QF guns on the ship's centreline, with one on the forecastle, one aft on a raised platform and one between the middle and aft funnels. A single 2-pounder (40 mm) pom-pom anti-aircraft gun was carried, while torpedo armament consisted of two twin mounts for 21 in (533 mm) torpedoes. The ship had a complement of 76 officers and ratings.

== Construction and career ==
Peyton was laid down by William Denny and Brothers of Dumbarton on 12 July 1915 with the yard number 1053, launched on 2 May the following year and completed on 29 June. The ship was named after Rear Admiral John Peyton, the captain of the third-rate ship of the line Defence. The vessel was deployed as part of the Grand Fleet, joining the newly-formed Fourteenth Destroyer Flotilla.

In February 1917, the destroyer was transferred to Cobh, Ireland, to counter increasing activity by German submarines in the Southwest Approaches. The submarines had been very active and the Royal Navy sent Peyton, along with sister ships Magic, Narwhal and Parthian, to act as anti-submarine escorts and to undertake patrols to protect merchant shipping. On 23 July, the destroyer, along with Narwhal, attacked the German submarine SM UB-23, which was ultimately interred on 29 July at Ferrol. Sometimes, the patrols were unsuccessful at deterring submarine attack and the vessels then rescued the survivors from the sunk ships.

Peyton returned to the Fourteenth and served there until the end of the war. After the armistice, the Royal Navy returned to a peacetime level of mobilisation, and surplus vessels were retired. Peyton was initially placed in reserve at Portsmouth alongside fifty other destroyers. Peyton was sold to be broken up by Thos. W. Ward at Morecambe on 9 May 1921.

== Pennant numbers ==
Pennant number	Date
G72	1915
G66	1917
H96	1918
