= Walsall Town Hall =

Municipal building in Walsall, West Midlands, England

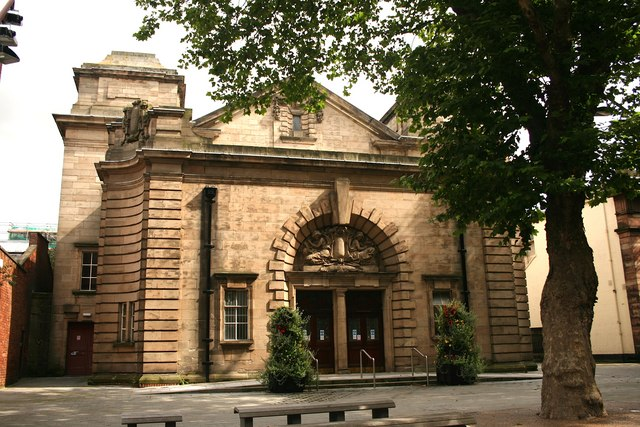
- The main entrance in 2008
- Interactive map of the Walsall Town Hall area

General information
- Type: Town Hall
- Architectural style: Baroque
- Classification

Listed Building – Grade II
- Designated: 31 July 1986
- Reference no.: 1076367
- Location: Lichfield Street, Walsall, Walsall, England
- Coordinates: 52.5856°N 1.9805°W
- Opened: 1903
- Owner: Walsall Metropolitan Borough Council

Design and construction
- Architect: James Glen Sivewright Gibson
- Designations: Grade II listed

Walsall Town Hall is located at Leicester Street in Walsall, West Midlands, England. The building, which opened in 1903, is used for a variety of functions including wedding receptions and concerts. It was designated a grade II listed building in 1986.

== History ==
The building was commissioned at the same time as the Walsall Council House and was erected on a site adjacent to it. The town hall was designed by James Glen Sivewright Gibson in the Baroque style, built in sandstone ashlar, and was completed in 1903. The design for the entrance includes a round archway with three Tuscan order columns, an architrave and a tympanum above. The pipe organ, which commemorates the Diamond Jubilee of Queen Victoria, was made by the local firm of Nicholson & Lord and installed in 1908. It was designed with 98 stops, five keyboards and 3,300 pipes.

A memorial to organist and composer Charles Swinnerton Heap, sculpted by Albert Toft, was installed in the building in 1905. A matched pair of pictures by Frank O. Salisbury were installed in the theatre. They were commissioned by the former local member of parliament, Joseph Leckie, "to commemorate the never to be forgotten valour of the South Staffordshire Regiments in the Great War 1914 - 1918" and completed in 1920. One shows "the First South Staffordshires attacking the Hohenzollern Redoubt", the other "the 5th South Staffords storming the St. Quentin Canal at Bellingtise Sept 29th 1918".

Rock musicians that performed at the Walsall Town Hall include Slade in 1966, The Who in 1966, and Robert Plant of Band of Joy (later of Led Zeppelin) in 1967. Black Sabbath performed in the hall in the late 1960s, and the heavy metal band, Jameson Raid, also performed there in 1980.

The organist, Harold Britton, recorded a concert entitled "Organ Extravaganza" on the ASV label on the organ in 1991. An episode from series 20 of the BBC programme Antiques Roadshow was filmed in the hall in November 1997.

A memorial plaque to Walsall's three recipients of the Victoria Cross, John Henry Carless, James Thompson and Charles George Bonner, was unveiled there in 2009. The rock band Reverend and the Makers performed there in 2012.
