= HMS Magic (1915) =

British M-Class destroyer of the First World War

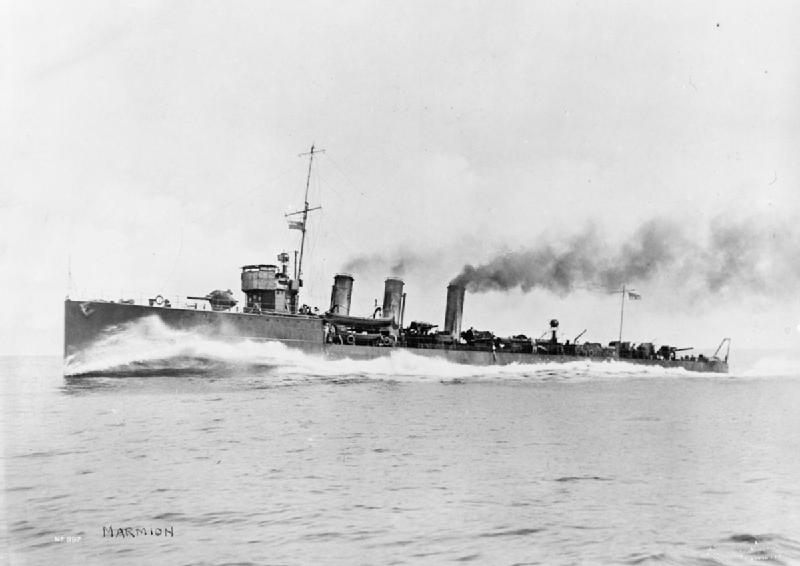
- Sistership HMS Marmion

History

United Kingdom
- Name: HMS Magic
- Ordered: September 1914
- Builder: J. Samuel White, East Cowes
- Yard number: 977
- Laid down: 1 January 1915
- Launched: 10 September 1915
- Commissioned: 8 January 1916
- Out of service: 22 September 1921

General characteristics
- Class & type: Admiralty M-class destroyer
- Displacement: 994 long tons (1,010 t) (normal); 1,028 long tons (1,044 t) (deep load)
- Length: 265 ft (80.8 m) (p.p.)
- Beam: 26 ft 9 in (8.2 m)
- Draught: 8 ft 6 in (2.6 m)
- Installed power: 3 White-Forster boilers, 25,000 shp (19,000 kW)
- Propulsion: Parsons steam turbines, 3 shafts
- Speed: 34 knots (39.1 mph; 63.0 km/h)
- Range: 2,280 nmi (4,220 km) at 17 kn (31 km/h)
- Complement: 80
- Armament: 3 × single QF 4-inch (102 mm) Mark IV guns; 1 × single 2-pdr 40 mm (1.6 in) AA gun; 2 × twin 21 in (533 mm) torpedo tubes

HMS Magic was an Admiralty M-class destroyer which served with the Royal Navy during the First World War. The M class were an improvement on the previous L class, capable of higher speed. Originally laid down as HMS Marigold by J. Samuel White at East Cowes on the Isle of Wight, the vessel was renamed before being launched in 1915. The ship served during the War as part of the Grand Fleet, mainly on anti-submarine and convoy escort duties from the port of Queenstown. In 1917, the destroyer took part in the Battle of Jutland and was one of a small number of British vessels that attacked the German fleet with torpedoes, although both torpedoes missed. In 1918, the ship struck a mine of the coast of Ireland and, although the damage was repaired, 25 people died. After the War, the destroyer was placed in reserve and decommissioned, being sold to be broken up in 1921.

== Design and development ==
Magic was one of sixteen Admiralty M-class destroyer destroyers ordered by the British Admiralty in September 1914 as part of the First War Construction Programme. The M class was an improved version of the earlier L-class destroyers, required to reach a higher speed in order to counter rumoured German fast destroyers. The remit was to have a maximum speed of 36 knots (67 km/h; 41 mph) and, although the eventual design did not achieve this, the greater performance was appreciated by the navy. It transpired that the German ships did not exist.

The destroyer had a length of 265 feet (80.8 m) between perpendiculars and 273 feet 4 inches (83 m) overall, with a beam of 26 feet 9 inches (8.2 m) and a draught of 8 feet 6 inches (2.6 m) at deep load. Displacement was 1,025 long tons (1,041 t) normal and 1,250 long tons (1,270 t) deep load. Power was provided by three White-Forster boilers feeding Parsons steam turbines rated at 25,000 shaft horsepower (19,000 kW) and driving three shafts, to give a design speed of 34 knots (63 km/h; 39 mph). Three funnels were fitted. A total of 268 long tons (272 t) of oil could be carried, including 40 long tons (41 t) in peace tanks that were not used in wartime, giving a range of 2,280 nautical miles (4,220 km; 2,620 mi) at 17 knots (31 km/h; 20 mph).

Armament consisted of three single QF 4-inch (102 mm) Mk IV guns on the ship's centreline, with one on the forecastle, one aft on a raised platform and one between the middle and aft funnels on a bandstand. Torpedo armament consisted of two twin mounts for 21 in (533 mm) torpedoes. A single QF 2-pounder 40 mm (1.6 in) "pom-pom" anti-aircraft gun was mounted between the torpedo tubes. After February 1916, for anti-submarine warfare, Magic was equipped with two chutes for depth charges and a paravane. The number of depth charges carried increased as the war progressed. The ship had a complement of 80 officers and ratings.

== Construction and career ==
Marigold was laid down by J. Samuel White at East Cowes on the Isle of Wight on 1 January 1915 with the yard number 1455, and launched on 10 September. The ship was completed on 8 January 1916 and joined the Grand Fleet. By this time, the ship's name had already been changed to Magic.

The vessel was initially deployed as part of the Grand Fleet, joining the Eleventh Destroyer Flotilla. On 30 May, the destroyer hsailed with the Grand Fleet to confront the German High Seas Fleet in what would be the Battle of Jutland. Magic was one of fourteen M-class destroyers that were allocated to form part of the screen to protect the battleships of the Fleet. In the ensuing battle, the destroyer fired two torpedoes at the German light cruisers SMS Elbing and SMS Hamburg, one of only two destroyers to use torpedoes in the melee. Both missed.

In February 1917, increasing U-boat activity threatened shipping sailing south of Ireland to Britain. A new flotilla of four destroyers, Magic, Narwhal, Parthian and Peyton were allocated to Queenstown in response to provide escort and anti-submarine duties. On 16 February, it was proposed that the flotilla move to Milford Haven in response to threats in the Bristol Channel, but the need did not transpire and so they remained at Queenstown. Another move to the Channel was attempted on 1 March, this time only with Magic and Narwhal, but again, the destroyers soon returned to Queenstown. The destroyer then escorted convoys across the Irish Sea, including one of four merchant ships that was redirected from Liverpool to Milford Haven on 28 March due to mines. Other duties including towing damaged ships, including the steamer Dykland, which had been attacked by SM U-50, on 23 April. On the following day, the vessel picked up the survivors from liner Abosso which had been sunk by the German submarine SM U-43, subsequently picking up survivors from the schooner Ehrglis and tanker Hektoria over the next week.

On 10 April 1918, the destroyer hit a mine that had been laid by the minelaying submarine SM UC-31 off the Irish coast near to Lough Swilly. 25 people died, but the ship was successfully repaired and returned to service. After the Armistice of 11 November 1918 that ended the war, the Royal Navy returned to a peacetime level of strength and both the number of ships and personnel were culled to save money. Magic was initially placed in reserve at Devonport. On 22 September 1921, the vessel was sold and broken up for scrap.

== Pennant numbers ==
Pennant number	Date
G01	January 1917
G0A	January 1918
H40	January 1919
