= Frederick Campbell (cricketer) =

Scottish cricketer and British Army officer

Personal information
- Full name: Frederick Campbell
- Born: 15 June 1843; Edinburgh, Midlothian, Scotland
- Died: 13 September 1926 (aged 83); Sydenham Hill, Kent, England
- Batting: Unknown
- Bowling: Unknown
- Relatives: Ian Campbell (son)

Domestic team information
- Years: Team
- 1868–1869: Marylebone Cricket Club

Career statistics
Competition	First-class
Matches	4
Runs scored	52
Batting average	8.66
100s/50s	–/–
Top score	34
Balls bowled	384
Wickets	13
Bowling average	8.92
5 wickets in innings	1
10 wickets in match	–
Best bowling	6/37
Catches/stumpings	4/–
- Source: Cricinfo, 29 September 2021

Colonel Frederick Campbell, CB, VD, JP (15 June 1843 — 13 September 1926) was a Scottish first-class cricketer and British Army officer.

The son of Sir John Campbell, he was born at Edinburgh on 15 June 1843. He was commissioned as a lieutenant in the Royal Artillery in December 1861 and fought in the New Zealand Wars from 1864 to 1866. Returning to England, Campbell made his debut in first-class cricket for the Gentlemen of Marylebone Cricket Club against Kent at the Canterbury Cricket Week in August 1867. He then played three first-class matches for the main Marylebone Cricket Club team, playing twice in 1868 against Surrey and the Surrey Club, and once against Hampshire in 1869. Known as "especially outstanding as a bowler", he took 13 wickets in his four first-class matches, taking one five wicket haul with figures of 6 for 37 against Kent on his first-class debut. Campbell played minor matches for various county gentlemen sides, in addition to being a member of I Zingari. He was a close friend of the cricketer W. G. Grace.

Campbell resigned his commission from the Royal Artillery in July 1869, in order to enter the family wine merchants business. This was not the end of his military association, with Campbell serving with the Volunteer Force as a member of the 1st Argyll and Bute Artillery Volunteers, for which he was to become honorary colonel. For his service as a volunteer, he was made a Companion of the Order of the Bath in the 1902 Birthday Honours and was awarded the Volunteer Officers' Decoration. Campbell was a resident of Dulwich for nearly 44 years and was active in local politics as a member of the Conservative Party. He served on London County Council for Norwood from 1895 to 1901, and following the First World War he was a member of the League of Nations Union. Campbell's other civic duties include governorship of St Dunstan's College and as a justice of the peace for Penge from 1912. He was married to Emilie Guillaumine Maclaine in January 1869, daughter of Donald Maclaine, chief of Clan Maclaine of Lochbuie. The couple had fifteen children, with offspring of note including the politician Sir Edward Campbell, the cricketer Ian Campbell, and Royal Navy admirals Gordon Campbell and James Campbell, with Gordon being a recipient of the Victoria Cross.

Campbell died at Sydenham Hill in September 1926. His grandson was Lorne MacLaine Campbell, a Victoria Cross recipient in the Second World War.
