= Ronald Stuart =

First World War Victoria Cross recipient and senior British Merchant Navy officer

Captain Ronald Stuart VC DSO RD
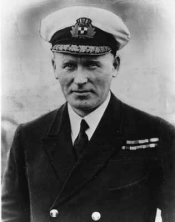
- Born: 26 August 1886; Toxteth, Liverpool
- Died: 8 February 1954 (aged 67); Charing, Kent
- Burial place: Charing Cemetery
- Military career
- Branch: Royal Naval Reserve; Merchant Navy
- Service years: 1914–1951
- Rank: Captain and Commodore
- Unit: Royal Naval Reserve
- Commands: Royal Navy: Q-ship HMS Tamarisk; Merchant Navy: SS Brandon, SS Minnedosa, SS Duchess of York, RMS Empress of Britain
- Conflicts: World War I: Atlantic U-boat Campaign; World War II
- Awards: Victoria Cross; Distinguished Service Order; Royal Navy Reserve Decoration; Mentioned in Despatches; Croix de Guerre (France); Navy Cross (United States)

Ronald Niel Stuart, VC, DSO, RD (26 August 1886 – 8 February 1954) was a British Merchant Navy commodore and Royal Navy captain who was highly commended following extensive and distinguished service at sea over a period of more than thirty-five years. During World War I he was awarded the Victoria Cross, the Distinguished Service Order, the French Croix de Guerre avec Palmes and the United States' Navy Cross for a series of daring operations he conducted while serving in the Royal Navy against the German U-boat campaign in the Atlantic.

Stuart received his Victoria Cross following a ballot by the men under his command. This unusual method of selection was used after the Admiralty board was unable to choose which members of the crew deserved the honour after a desperate engagement between a Q-ship and a German submarine off the Irish coast. His later career included command of the liner RMS Empress of Britain and the management of the London office of a major transatlantic shipping company. Following his retirement in 1951, Stuart moved into his sister's cottage in Kent and died three years later. A sometimes irascible man, he was reportedly embarrassed by any fuss surrounding his celebrity and was known to exclaim "Mush!" at any demonstration of strong emotion.

== Early life ==
Ronald Niel Stuart was born in 1886 in Liverpool to Neil Stuart and Mary Harrison Banks, both from experienced seafaring families. Neil Sr. had been born on Prince Edward Island in Canada and had married Mary in Montreal. She was the daughter of a master mariner. In the 1880s the family moved to Liverpool, where Stuart was born as the youngest of six children. Neil worked in the city as a dock superintendent and owner of a wholesale tea shop before dying suddenly while preparing for a return to the Merchant Navy.

Stuart was by this time a stocky, blonde, blue-eyed man described as "powerful" but "very bleak and penetrating". He was initially educated at Shaw Street College, but following his father's death was forced to leave and take a job as a clerk in an office. Stuart's son commented that "He hated it [the job]. He hated Liverpool". In 1902, Stuart decided to leave the city and find work in a different environment. He took an apprenticeship with the shipping company Steele & Co and was sent to learn his trade on the sailing barque Kirkhill.

In 1905 the Kirkhill was wrecked on a rock near the Falkland Islands. Stuart survived the sinking and returned to England to continue his training. He was posted to a new ship upon his return but she too was wrecked by a cyclone off the Florida coast. Eventually, after several years service he achieved his mariner's qualifications and gained a job with the Allan Line as a junior officer. He then served in a variety of sailing and steam ships traveling across most of the world. In 1910, the Allan Line was taken over by the Canadian Pacific Line and he continued working with the company's new owners as a junior ship's officer.

== First World War ==
At the outbreak of World War I Stuart was called up to service, as an officer in the Royal Naval Reserve. He was originally posted as a junior officer on board the old and obsolete destroyer HMS Opossum in Plymouth. This ship was used for harbour patrols and intercepting neutral merchant ships and other work Stuart considered tedious. He became increasingly impatient with the life and repeatedly applied to his senior officers with requests for transfer; at one point he even requested that he be commissioned into the army. All of these were turned down, with increasing levels of hostility from his commanders, one of whom was reported to have told him to "Go to hell! And shut the door behind you!"

=== HMS Farnborough ===
In the spring of 1916 he was transferred as first lieutenant to a Q-ship under Gordon Campbell. A Q-ship was a merchant ship with hidden weaponry, commanded secretly by the navy and manned by a Royal Navy crew. When attacked by a submarine, the Q-ship would feign damage until the enemy was close enough to engage and then reveal its weapons to counter-attack. Campbell, a major proponent of Q-ship strategy, was impressed with Stuart's stubborn refusal to accept the two years of rejection and brought him in to replace an officer whose nerves had cracked under the strain of Q-ship operations.

Stuart's experience in merchant shipping proved invaluable to his work and he soon had the crew of Q5 (also known as HMS Farnborough) disciplined and the ship well maintained and run. Campbell himself was very pleased with his executive officer, declaring him "on the top line". Stuart and Campbell later fell out over Stuart's belief that Campbell was exaggerating the danger of Q-ship service, Stuart comparing his own life favourably with service in the trenches.

His first year of Q-ship service was frustrating for Stuart and the crew. Although, prior to his attachment to the ship, Farnborough had succeeded in sinking an enemy submarine (the U-68 in March 1916), there had been no successes since. In February 1917, Campbell decided that in order to properly invite an attack, the Farnborough would have to actually be torpedoed before combat and then engage the submarine as she closed to finish the job with shellfire. On 17 February this theory was proven correct off Southern Ireland when the lone Farnborough was struck by a torpedo fired at extreme range. Campbell intentionally failed to evade the missile and the ship took the blow in the hold, causing some minor injuries to the crew but serious damage to the ship. The crew were well rehearsed and the "panic party" took to their boats with a great show of alarm and disorder while the gun crews manned positions on their hidden weapons. When four lifeboats had been released and the ship had settled in the water and was clearly sinking, the submarine U-83 pulled up just ten yards (9.1 m) from the wreck. A hail of shot was then unleashed by the Farnborough's remaining crew from their six-pounder gun and several machine guns into the stationary submarine. The very first shot decapitated the German captain Bruno Hoppe and the U-boat was rapidly reduced to a battered wreck. Eight German sailors escaped the submarine before it sank but only two could be pulled from the water, one of whom subsequently died from his wounds.

The Farnborough too was sinking from her torpedo damage. Realising this, Campbell left the men in the boats, destroyed all confidential papers and radioed for help. His unorthodox message read: "Q5 slowly sinking respectfully wishes you goodbye". This message reached nearby naval shipping, and within an hour the destroyers HMS Narwhal and HMS Buttercup arrived and began to tow the stricken ship back to land. During the night a depth charge accidentally exploded on board Farnborough and the tow was dropped. Campbell ordered the twelve men remaining aboard into a lifeboat and attempted to take a final survey of his vessel, only to be driven back by another exploding depth charge. On returning to the rail he discovered that Stuart had disobeyed his order and remained on board, to make sure his captain disembarked safely. The tow was later reattached and the battered Farnborough beached at Mill Cove, in no fit state to return to sea. Campbell was awarded the Victoria Cross in recognition of his service in the action and £1,000 of prize money was shared among the crew. Stuart and Engineer-Lieutenant Len Loveless were both presented with the Distinguished Service Order.

=== HMS Pargust ===
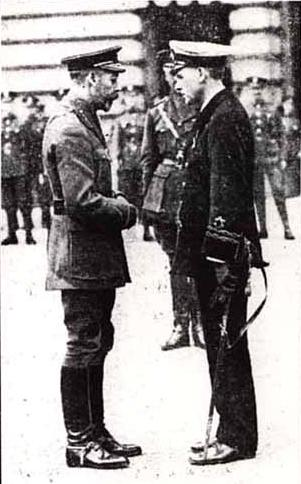
Ronald Stuart receiving his VC from King George V outside Buckingham Palace

Following the action Stuart remained with Campbell and Loveless as Inspectors of Shipping, choosing those vessels they believed to be best suited to Q-ship work for naval service. After some time ashore all three returned to sea in a vessel they had personally chosen, an old, battered tramp steamer named SS Vittoria. Renaming it HMS Pargust, they armed their vessel with a 4-inch (102 mm) gun, two twelve pounders, two machine guns, torpedo tubes and depth charges. Thus armed the Pargust departed on her first patrol to the same grounds where U-83 had been sunk, in the waters south of Ireland. For the first few days her duties consisted only of rescuing survivors from sunken cargo ships but with increasing German activity, an attack was expected at any moment. On 7 June 1917, Pargust was suddenly struck by a torpedo fired at very close range from an unseen German submarine. Unlike the Farnborough action, the damage done to the Pargust was immense. The ship was holed close to the waterline, and its cover was almost blown when one of the twelve pounder gun ports was blasted free from its mounting; it was only the quick thinking of sailor William Williams, who took the full weight of the gun port on himself, that prevented the gun being exposed. One petty officer was killed and a number wounded.

By this stage in the war, the German submarine authorities had become aware of the existence of Q-ships and Captain Ernst Rosenow of UC-29 was taking no risks with his target, remaining at 400 yards (370 m) distance watching the staged panicked evacuation of the ship. While the hidden gun crews watched the enemy approach the lifeboats, the officer in charge of the boats, Lieutenant Francis Hereford, realised that the submarine would follow his movements, as its commander assumed him to be the captain. Hereford therefore ordered his men to row back towards the ship, thus luring the enemy into range. This made the submarine commander believe that the ship's crew were planning to regain their vessel and he immediately closed to just 50 yards (46 m), surfaced and began angrily semaphoring to the "survivors" in the boats. This was exactly what the gun crews had been waiting for and a volley of fire was directed at the U-boat. Numerous holes were blown in the conning tower and the submarine desperately attempted to flee on the surface before slowing down and heeling over, trailing oil. The gun crews then stopped firing only for the submarine to suddenly restart its engines and attempt to escape. In a final barrage of fire the submarine was hit fatally, a large explosion blowing the vessel in two. Rosenow and 22 of his crew were killed, while two survivors were rescued by the panic party.

The wrecked Pargust was taken in tow by HMS Crocus, USS Cushing and HMS Zinnia and reached Queenstown barely afloat nearly two days later. The port's admiral congratulated the crew personally on their arrival. As before, the crew were awarded £1,000 prize money and several awards were promised. Unusually, the Admiralty were unable to decide who among the ship's crew should receive the Victoria Cross as all were deemed to have participated in the action with equal valour. It was thus decided for the first time, under article 13 of the Victoria Cross's royal warrant, that one officer and one enlisted man would be granted the award following a ballot by the ship's company. After the vote, from which Campbell abstained, the Victoria Crosses were awarded to Stuart and William Williams. Fourteen other crew members were awarded medals, including DSOs for Campbell and Hereford. In addition, every sailor had his participation in the action and subsequent ballot noted on his service records.

Due to the official secrecy surrounding the activities of the Q-ships, Stuart's and Williams's Victoria Crosses were announced without fanfare or explanation of their actions; even the Pargust's name was omitted from the citation. The full account of the action was not published until after the armistice in November 1918. Stuart was noted as the first Anglo-Canadian to receive the Victoria Cross and his obituary later stated that in the action, "his gallantry stood out". The medal was presented to him in a ceremony at Buckingham Palace by King George V on 23 July 1917.

=== Victoria Cross citations ===
The award alone without any details was announced in The London Gazette dated 20 July 1917.

"To receive the Victoria Cross.
Lieut. Ronald Neil Stuart, D.S.O., R.N.R.
Sea. William Williams, R.N.R., O.N., 6224A
Lieutenant Stuart and Seaman Williams were selected by the officers and ship's company respectively of one of H.M. Ships to receive the Victoria Cross under Rule 13 of the Royal Warrant dated 29th January, 1856."

As with other Victoria Cross awards for "services in action with enemy submarines" the circumstances of the award were not announced until after the end of the war.

"On the 7th June, 1917, while disguised as a British merchant vessel with a dummy gun mounted aft, H.M.S. "Pargust" was torpedoed at very close range. Her boiler-room, engine-room, and No. 5 hold were immediately flooded, and the starboard lifeboat was blown to pieces. The weather was misty at the time, fresh breeze and a choppy sea. The "Panic Party", under the command of Lieutenant F. R. Hereford, D.S.C., R.N.R., abandoned ship, and as the last boat was shoving off, the periscope of the submarine was observed close before the port beam about 400 yards distant. The enemy then submerged, and periscope reappeared directly astern, passing to the starboard quarter, and then round to the port beam, when it turned again towards the ship, breaking surface about 50 yards away. The lifeboat, acting as a lure, commenced to pull round the stern; submarine followed closely and Lieutenant Hereford, with complete disregard of the danger incurred from the fire of either ship or submarine (who had trained a maxim on the lifeboat), continued to decoy her to within 50 yards of the ship. The "Pargust" then opened fire with all guns, and the submarine, with oil squirting from her side and the crew pouring out of the conning tower, steamed slowly across the bows with a heavy list. The enemy crew held up their hands in token of surrender, whereupon fire immediately ceased. The submarine then began to move away at a gradually increasing speed, apparently endeavouring to escape in the mist. Fire was reopened until she sank, one man clinging to the bow as she went down. The boats, after a severe pull to the windward, succeeded in saving one officer and one man. American Destroyers and a British sloop arrived shortly afterwards, and the "Pargust" was towed back to port. As on the previous occasions, officers and men displayed the utmost courage and confidence in their captain, and the action serves as an example of what perfect discipline, when coupled with such confidence, can achieve."

=== HMS Tamarisk ===
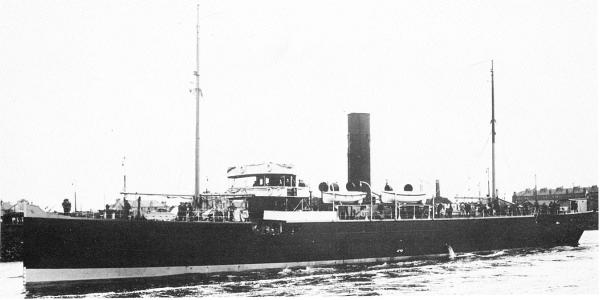
HMS Tamarisk in Q-ship garb

In addition to receiving the Victoria Cross, Stuart was promoted to lieutenant commander and given his own command, HMS Tamarisk. Tamarisk was a small sloop built in 1916 that was capable of being disguised as a merchant vessel and used as a Q-ship, designated Q11.

A few months after assuming command, on 15 October 1917, Stuart was on hand to rescue the United States Navy destroyer USS Cassin after she was torpedoed by U-61 in heavy weather. Along with one crewmember killed and nine wounded, the Cassin had lost her entire stern including the rudder and was in danger of sinking. The dead crew member was Osmond Ingram, who had died throwing burning munitions overboard and was later posthumously awarded the Medal of Honor. Twenty miles from the Irish coast and in total darkness, the Tamarisk not only found the crippled ship but was able to come alongside in high seas and a strong gale and pass across a tow line. Twice during the night the tow broke and twice it was reconnected as the battle to save the ship continued. The next morning several trawlers came to the aid of the Q-ship and together they enabled the Cassin to make port, saving the ship and her crew. Ten years after the Cassin's rescue the US Navy awarded Stuart the Navy Cross in recognition of his part in the operation; it was a rare presentation to a sailor of a foreign navy and the only occasion in which the recipient also possessed the Victoria Cross.

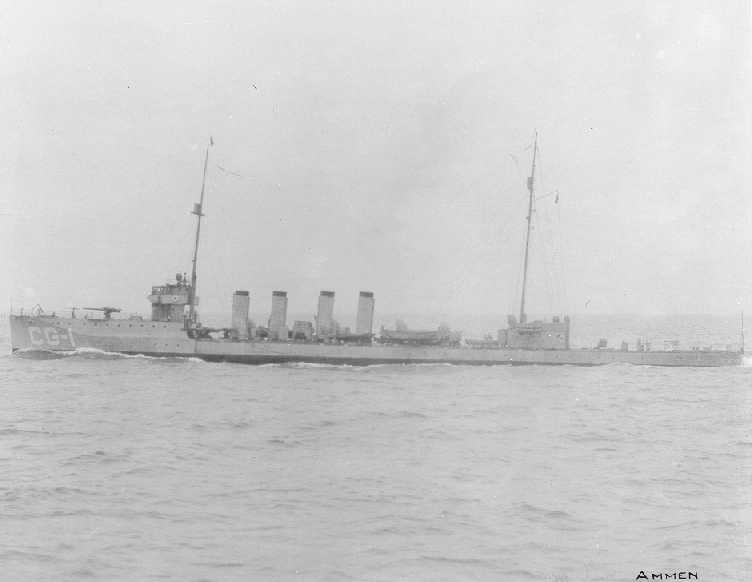
USS Cassin

The remainder of the war was quiet for Stuart, achieving no further successes against submarines. Upon the armistice the full details of his Victoria Cross action were revealed and, in 1919, he was mentioned in despatches in recognition of the service he had performed during the Q-ship operations. As further recognition of his overall efforts against the German submarine campaign, the French government presented him with the Croix de Guerre.

In 1919, Stuart returned to Canadian Pacific, his maritime reputation on both sides of the Atlantic greatly enhanced by his war record. In the same year he met and married his wife Evelyn, with whom he had three sons and two daughters.

== Return to the Merchant Navy ==
After post-war service on a succession of merchant ships, Stuart was provided with his first merchant command, the steam freighter SS Brandon, in 1927. After a short period in charge, he was again promoted and transferred, taking up the role of staff captain on the liner RMS Empress of Australia.

=== Ships' captain ===
Blue Ensign flown by merchant vessels under the command of officers in the Royal Naval Reserve.

Just a year later he again moved, becoming full captain on the 15,000-ton liner SS Minnedosa – a smaller and slower ship that transported immigrants to Canada. Stuart was one of a number of Royal Naval Reserve officers employed by Canadian Pacific, part of a deliberate recruitment policy by the company. In 1929, he was given his biggest command yet as he took over the newly completed 20,000-ton ocean liner SS Duchess of York. He commanded her for five years along her route from Liverpool to Saint John, New Brunswick stopping at Belfast and Greenock. He also briefly commanded her on the New York City to Bermuda route. It was during this period, in 1929, that he was awarded the Decoration for Officers of the Royal Naval Reserve (RD) in honour of his long service and in 1935 he was made a full Naval Reserve Captain. He maintained his connection with the RNR throughout his life, becoming Honorary President of the RNR Officer's Club and a part-time naval aide-de-camp to King George VI in 1941 – a position he held part-time throughout World War II. A special warrant was written in 1927 that allowed him to fly the Blue Ensign from any ship, mercantile or military, which he commanded.

In 1931, while he was in command of the Duchess of York, his wife suddenly died in Toxteth. This event is said to have changed Stuart's demeanour and plunged him into a depression. He never again took time off work and left his children to the sole care and maintenance of his four maiden sisters in England. In 1934 he took over his last and most important seagoing role as Commodore of the CPS fleet and was placed in command of the 42,000-ton liner RMS Empress of Britain on her transatlantic route.

After three years in command of the Empress on the England to Quebec route, Stuart was given a desk job managing the company's assets in Montreal. In 1937, he was promoted to company superintendent, a role followed by the job of general manager at Canadian Pacific's London office. He retained this job for 13 years, including through the difficult experiences of World War II when London's dockyards were badly damaged by the London Blitz. Two of his sons served in the war in the Royal Navy; one transferred to the Royal Canadian Navy after the war. Both were decorated for bravery while fighting in the Battle of the Atlantic against the resurgent German submarine fleet. One was presented with the Distinguished Service Cross, while the other was Mentioned in Despatches.

=== Retirement ===
Retiring in 1951, Stuart retreated to his sisters' cottage in Charing, Kent, and spent his days reading, walking, observing nature and visiting the cinema, where he was reportedly notorious for "jeering embarrassingly loudly at falsely heroic, sentimental or emotional passages" and shouting "Mush!" at parts of movies he did not approve. He died aged 67 at the cottage on 8 February 1954 and was buried in local Charing Cemetery. For many years his gravestone was in a poor state of repair but it was later replaced with a standard white Commonwealth War Grave headstone. Following his death, 'Stuart Close' in Lee-on-Solent was named for him and his medals were collected and donated on permanent loan to the National Maritime Museum, where they are on display.
