= Walsall Council House =

Municipal building in Walsall, West Midlands, England

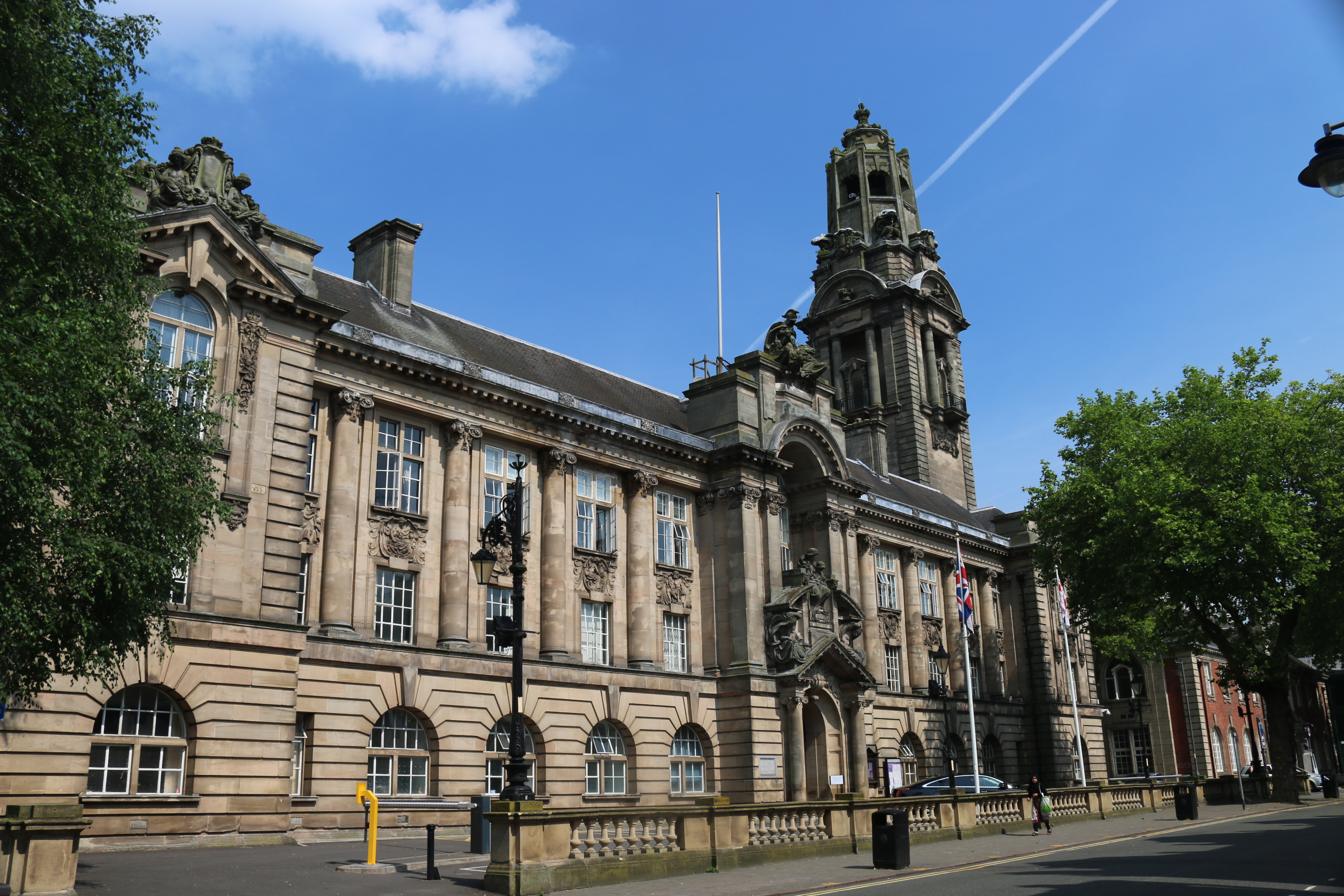
- Walsall Council House

- Shown in West Midlands
- 52.5858°N 1.9801°W
- Location: Walsall

History
- Built: 1905

Site notes
- Architect: James Glen Sivewright Gibson
- Architectural style: Baroque style

Listed Building – Grade II
- Designated: 31 July 1986
- Reference no.: 1343029

Walsall Council House is a municipal building in Lichfield Street in Walsall, West Midlands, England. It is a Grade II listed building.

== History ==
The St. John's Guildhall in the High Street, which had been built in 1416, was appropriated by the borough council and served as the local seat of local government for many centuries. It was rebuilt in 1773 and much of it was rebuilt again to a design by G. B. Nichols of West Bromwich in an Italianate style in 1867. By the late 19th century the guildhall was overcrowded and the council sought larger facilities; a site which was then occupied by a large house and by the Walsall Liberal Club was selected as suitable for redevelopment.

The foundation stone for the new building was laid by Prince Christian of Schleswig-Holstein on 29 May 1902. The building, which was designed by James Glen Sivewright Gibson in the Baroque style, was built at a cost of £98,400 (equivalent to £13.7 million (Note: United Kingdom Gross Domestic Product deflator figures follow the MeasuringWorth "consistent series" supplied in Thomas, Ryland; Williamson, Samuel H. (2026), "What Was the U.K. GDP Then?", MeasuringWorth) in 2024) and was completed in 1905. It was built adjoining Walsall Town Hall which had been commissioned a few years earlier as a public assembly hall.

The main entrance to the council house was designed with a round head and Ionic order columns; the ground floor was styled with round-headed windows and projecting keystones while the bays on the first and second floors were separated by large Composite order columns. A large tower was erected at the east end of the building with open balconies on each side and a roof lantern above. The carvings on the exterior of the council house, including the seated female figure of Justice above the entrance, were designed by Henry Charles Fehr. The council chamber inside the building was fitted out with fine neoclassical plasterwork as well as Ionic order columns and pilasters. A wooden board listing all the town mayors who have served since 1377 was erected on the wall of the council chamber ante-room.

In 1916 during the First World War, the mayor, Mary Slater, was hit by shrapnel and subsequently died from her injuries during an attack on the council house from a Zeppelin.

The council house served as the headquarters of the county borough of Walsall and, following the implementation of the Local Government Act 1972, continued to serve as the local seat of government of the enlarged Walsall Metropolitan Borough Council. Queen Elizabeth II, accompanied by the Duke of Edinburgh, visited the council house as part of her silver jubilee celebrations and signed the visitors' book on 27 July 1977.

A plaster cast model of the local nurse, Sister Dora, which had been located in the foyer of the council house for many years, was moved to Walsall Manor Hospital in September 2010.

Refurbishment works, including upholstery repairs on the fine furniture in the council chamber and improvements to the council house reception area, were carried out in 2019 and 2020.
