= John Henry Carless =

British recipient of the Victoria Cross

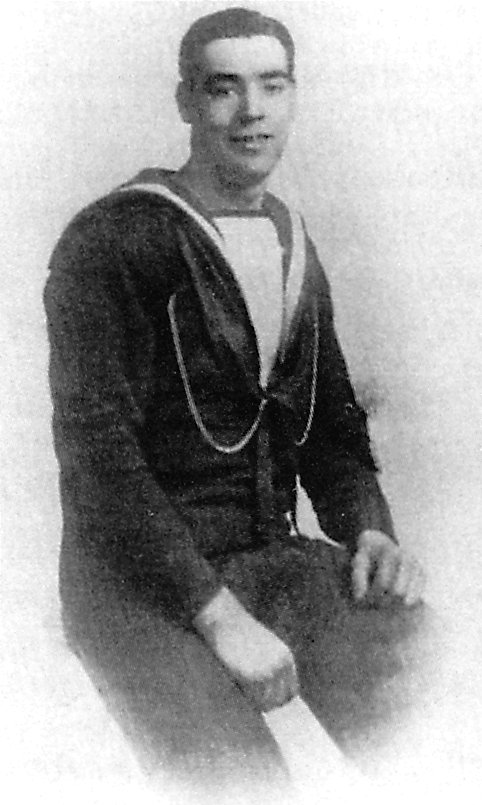
- John Henry Carless
- Born: 11 November 1896; Walsall, England
- Died: 17 November 1917 (aged 21); HMS Caledon, Heligoland Bight, off German Empire
- Burial place: at sea
- Military career
- Allegiance: United Kingdom
- Branch: Royal Navy
- Service years: 1914–1917 †
- Rank: Ordinary Seaman
- Units: HMS Caledon
- Conflicts: World War I: Naval campaign; North Sea campaign; Second Battle of Heligoland Bight (DOW)
- Awards: Victoria Cross

John Henry Carless VC (11 November 1896 – 17 November 1917) was a British recipient of the Victoria Cross during the First World War.

== Early life ==
Carless was born in 1896 to John Thomas Carless, an iron foundry worker, and his wife Elizabeth, of 31 Tasker Street, Walsall, Staffordshire (now in the West Midlands). Carless had two sisters, Ada and Dora, who were each employed in the local leather trade.

He was good at sport and played in the final of the English Schools Football Shield, at Roker Park.

After school, he too joined the leather trade, working for Messrs Price and Co., harness makers, as an errand boy.

During World War I, he applied repeatedly to join the army, but was turned down on four occasions, due to a "weak heart". His subsequent application to join the Royal Navy was accepted, and he enlisted on 1 September 1915. His service number was J43703. He was 21 when he died.

== VC ==
He died when he was 21 years old, and an Ordinary Seaman in the Royal Navy during World War I. He was awarded the Victoria Cross for his gallant actions on 17 November 1917 aboard HMS Caledon at the Second Battle of Heligoland Bight, Germany, which led to his death.

In mid-November 1917 British ships battled German forces in the Second Battle of Heligoland Bight (off Germany's north coast). During the action Seaman Carless took a fatal shrapnel wound to the stomach but kept loading his gun, and encouraged his colleagues to do likewise. Once relieved, he collapsed and died. He was buried at sea the following day.

The commander of HMS Caledon, H.S. Harrison-Wallace, subsequently wrote Carless's parents:

He was a most gallant lad and very promising. We feel his loss on the ship very much and all send their sincere sympathy to you and his family in his loss... You will be very proud to have the satisfaction of knowing that he did his duty so bravely and gallantly, fighting his King and country's enemy – the finest death a man can have. I buried him at sea and he had a very impressive funeral, attended by all his shipmates and the commander.

In June 1918, Carless's parents received his posthumous VC from King George V.

=== Citation ===
For most conspicuous bravery and devotion to duty. Although mortally wounded in the abdomen, he still went on serving the gun at which he was acting as rammer, lifting a projectile and helping to clear away the other casualties. He collapsed once, but got up, tried again, and cheered on the new gun's crew. He then fell and died. He not only set a very inspiring and memorable example, but he also, whilst mortally wounded, continued to do effective work against the King's enemies.

— The London Gazette, No. 30687, 17 May 1918

== Memorials ==
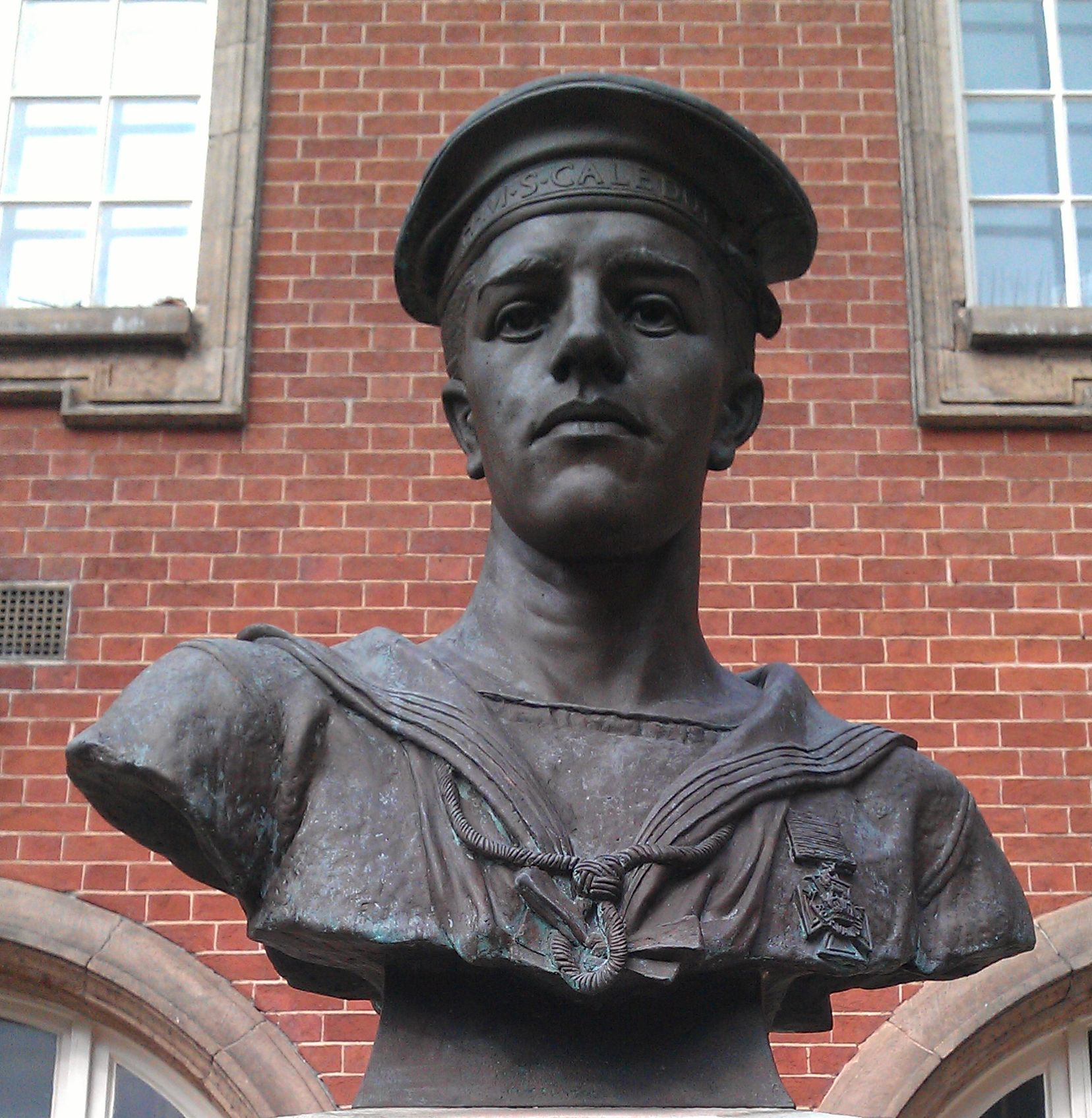
the Walsall bust

The Walsall public raised money for the erection of a memorial in his home town. A bronze bust was created by Wolverhampton-based Robert Jackson Emerson mounted on a large plinth of Portland stone, outside Walsall Museum (at 52.585906°N 1.979087°W), Lichfield Street. On 20 February 1920 it was unveiled by Admiral Sir Walter Cowan, whose flagship had been HMS Caledon, and the ship's white ensign was presented to Walsall's mayor at the time.

Carless is listed on Panel 25 of the Portsmouth Naval Memorial. Three thoroughfares in Walsall commemorate John Carless' bravery – Carless Street, in Caldmore, not far from where he was born, along with Caledon Street and Caledon Place in Pleck. A blue plaque on Carless Street notes the origins of the street's name.

In December 2009, a memorial plaque to Carless and two other recipients of the Victoria Cross, James Thompson and Charles George Bonner, was unveiled at Walsall Town Hall.

In 2014, a memorial paving stone was placed in the grounds of St Mary's the Mount Catholic Primary School in Walsall, where Carless was educated.

=== Museum exhibits ===
The former Walsall Museum had a display on Carless, including a replica of his VC (the original, bequeathed to the people of Walsall in 1986, is held in store, for security reasons), the ship's name-band from his uniform cap, and an oil portrait, commissioned by the Walsall Services Memorial Club. After that museum's closure, the display was moved to Walsall Leather Museum.
