= Lorne Campbell (VC) =

Recipient of the Victoria Cross

Brigadier Lorne Campbell VC DSO & Bar OBE TD
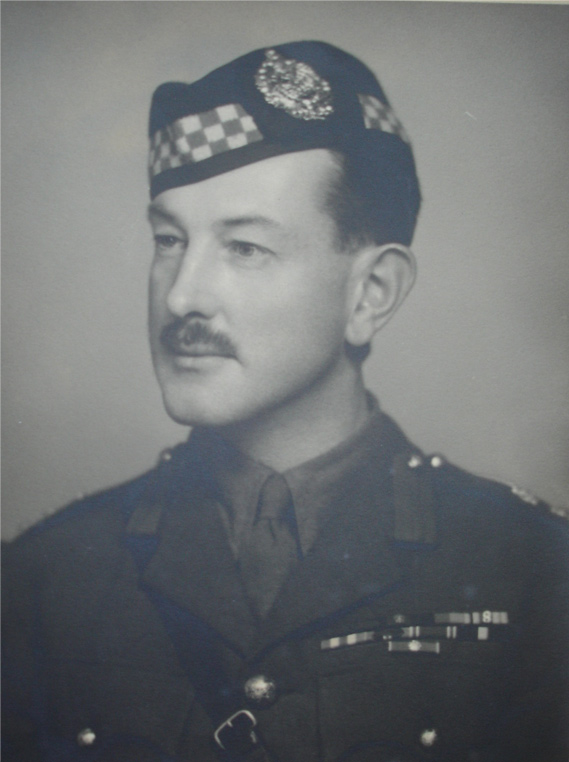
- Born: 22 July 1902; Airds, Argyll, Scotland
- Died: 25 May 1991 (aged 88); Edinburgh, Scotland
- Burial place: Warriston Cemetery, Edinburgh, Scotland
- Relatives: Gordon Campbell (uncle)
- Military career
- Allegiance: United Kingdom
- Branch: British Army
- Service years: 1921–1945
- Rank: Brigadier
- Service number: 16220
- Unit: Argyll and Sutherland Highlanders
- Commands: 13th Infantry Brigade; 7th Battalion, Argyll and Sutherland Highlanders
- Conflicts: Second World War
- Awards: Victoria Cross; Distinguished Service Order & Bar; Officer of the Order of the British Empire; Mentioned in Despatches (4); Territorial Decoration; Legion of Merit (United States)

Brigadier Lorne MacLaine Campbell, VC, DSO & Bar, OBE, TD (22 July 1902 – 25 May 1991) was a British Army officer and a Scottish recipient of the Victoria Cross, the highest award for gallantry in the face of the enemy that can be awarded to British and Commonwealth forces.

== Early life ==
Lorne MacLaine Campbell was born on 22 July 1902 in Airds, Argyll, Scotland, the eldest of three sons of Colonel Ian Campbell and Hilda Mary Wade. He was schooled at the Dulwich College Preparatory School, and then at Dulwich College in South London between 1915 and 1921 (as was his uncle and fellow recipient of the Victoria Cross, Vice Admiral Gordon Campbell). Between 1921 and 1925, he attended Merton College, Oxford, where he was President of the Junior Common Room and of the Myrmidon Club and graduated with a second class degree in Literae Humaniores, after which he joined the family wine shipping company.

== Military service ==
Campbell was commissioned as a second lieutenant into the 8th battalion Argyll and Sutherland Highlanders (Territorial Army) on 23 September 1921, then under the command of his father. By 1939, Campbell was a major and second-in-command of the battalion.

=== Second World War ===
In August 1939, shortly before the outbreak of the Second World War, Campbell's unit, the 8th (Argyllshire) Battalion, Argyll and Sutherland Highlanders was mobilised for war service. Serving as part of the 154th Infantry Brigade, which also included the 7th Battalion, Argylls and the 6th Battalion, Black Watch, of Major General Victor Fortune's 51st (Highland) Infantry Division, the battalion underwent months of training before departing for France as part of the British Expeditionary Force (BEF) in January 1940. During the Battle of France in May–June 1940 Campbell was awarded the Distinguished Service Order (DSO) for gallant leadership during the 51st Division's withdrawal to the coast when, although most of the division was captured at Saint-Valery-en-Caux, Campbell and most of the 154th Brigade managed to reach Le Havre and were evacuated.

After returning the battalion, which had suffered very heavy losses, was reformed with large numbers of reinforcements. In 1942 he became commanding officer of the 7th Battalion, Argylls (although it was then designated as the 7th/10th Battalion), still serving as part of the 154th Brigade in the 51st (Highland) Division, re-formed in August 1940 by the redesignation of the 9th (Highland) Infantry Division, and led the battalion overseas to North Africa in August 1942. At the Second Battle of El Alamein in late 1942, Campbell received a Bar to his DSO for his part in the capture of important objectives. He led the battalion, after El Alamein, throughout the Tunisian campaign, at El Agheila, in the capture of the Libyan port of Tripoli, Medenine, and Wadi Akarit, where he gained his Victoria Cross. On 28 April, shortly before the campaign came to an end, Campbell became acting commander of the 153rd Brigade.

On 20 May Campbell was promoted to the acting rank of brigadier and took command of the 13th Infantry Brigade, part of the 5th Infantry Division. The brigade, a Regular Army formation, was then serving in Syria, later moving to Egypt, before taking part in the Allied invasion of Sicily, from July until mid-August. After a brief rest, the division, participated in the Allied invasion of Italy, Campbell leading the brigade throughout the 5th Division's involvement in the Italian campaign, seeing service during the Moro River Campaign, the Battle of Monte Cassino, and the Battle of Anzio, before leaving Italy in early July 1944 to return to Egypt, later Palestine, to rest and refit. For eight days in April, he was acting general officer commanding of the 5th Division, when the division was in the Anzio beachhead, in place of Major General Philip Gregson-Ellis. Relinquishing command of the brigade in September, Campbell ended the war in the United States, in Washington D.C. as a brigadier with the British Army Staff.

==== Victoria Cross ====
Campbell was a 40 years old temporary lieutenant colonel in the 7th Battalion, Argyll and Sutherland Highlanders (Princess Louise's), British Army, during the Second World War at Wadi Akarit in Tunisia. The citation in the London Gazette read:

On the 6th April, 1943, in the attack upon the Wadi Akarit position, the task of breaking through the enemy minefield and anti-tank ditch to the East of the Roumana feature and of forming the initial bridgehead for a Brigade of the 51st Highland Division was allotted to the Battalion of the Argyll and Sutherland Highlanders commanded by Lieutenant-Colonel Campbell.
The attack had to form up in complete darkness and had to traverse the main offshoot of the Wadi Akarit at an angle to the line of advance. In spite of heavy machine gun and shell fire in the early stages of the attack, Lieutenant-Colonel Campbell successfully accomplished this difficult operation, captured at least 600 prisoners and led his Battalion to its objective, having to cross an unswept portion of the enemy minefield in doing so.
Later, upon reaching his objective he found that a gap which had been blown by the Royal Engineers in the anti-tank ditch did not correspond with the vehicle lane which had been cleared in the minefield. Realising the vital necessity of quickly establishing a gap for the passage of anti-tank guns, he took personal charge of this operation. It was now broad daylight and, under very heavy machine-gun fire and shell fire, he succeeded in making a personal reconnaissance and in conducting operations which led to the establishing of a vehicle gap.
Throughout the day Lieutenant-Colonel Campbell held his position with his Battalion in the face of extremely heavy and constant shell fire, which the enemy was able to bring to bear by direct observation.
About 1630 hours determined enemy counter-attacks began to develop, accompanied by tanks. In this phase of the fighting Lieutenant-Colonel Campbell's personality dominated the battle field by a display of valour and utter disregard for personal safety, which could not have been excelled. Realising that it was imperative for the future success of the Army plan to hold the bridgehead his Battalion had captured, he inspired his men by his presence in the forefront of the battle, cheering them on and rallying them as he moved to those points where the fighting was heaviest.
When his left forward company was forced to give ground he went forward alone, into a hail of fire and personally reorganised their position, remaining with the company until the attack at this point was held. As reinforcements arrived upon the scene he was seen standing in the open directing the fight under close range fire of enemy infantry and he continued to do so although already painfully wounded in the neck by shell fire. It was not until the battle died down that he allowed his wound to be dressed. Even then, although in great pain, he refused to be evacuated, remaining with his Battalion and continuing to inspire them by his presence on the field.
Darkness fell with the Argylls still holding their positions, though many of its officers and men had become casualties.
There is no doubt that but for Lieutenant-Colonel Campbell's determination, splendid example of courage and disregard of pain, the bridgehead would have been lost. This officer's gallantry and magnificent leadership when his now tired men were charging the enemy with the bayonet and were fighting them at hand grenade range, are worthy of the highest honour, and can seldom have been surpassed in the long history of the Highland Brigade.

== Personal life ==
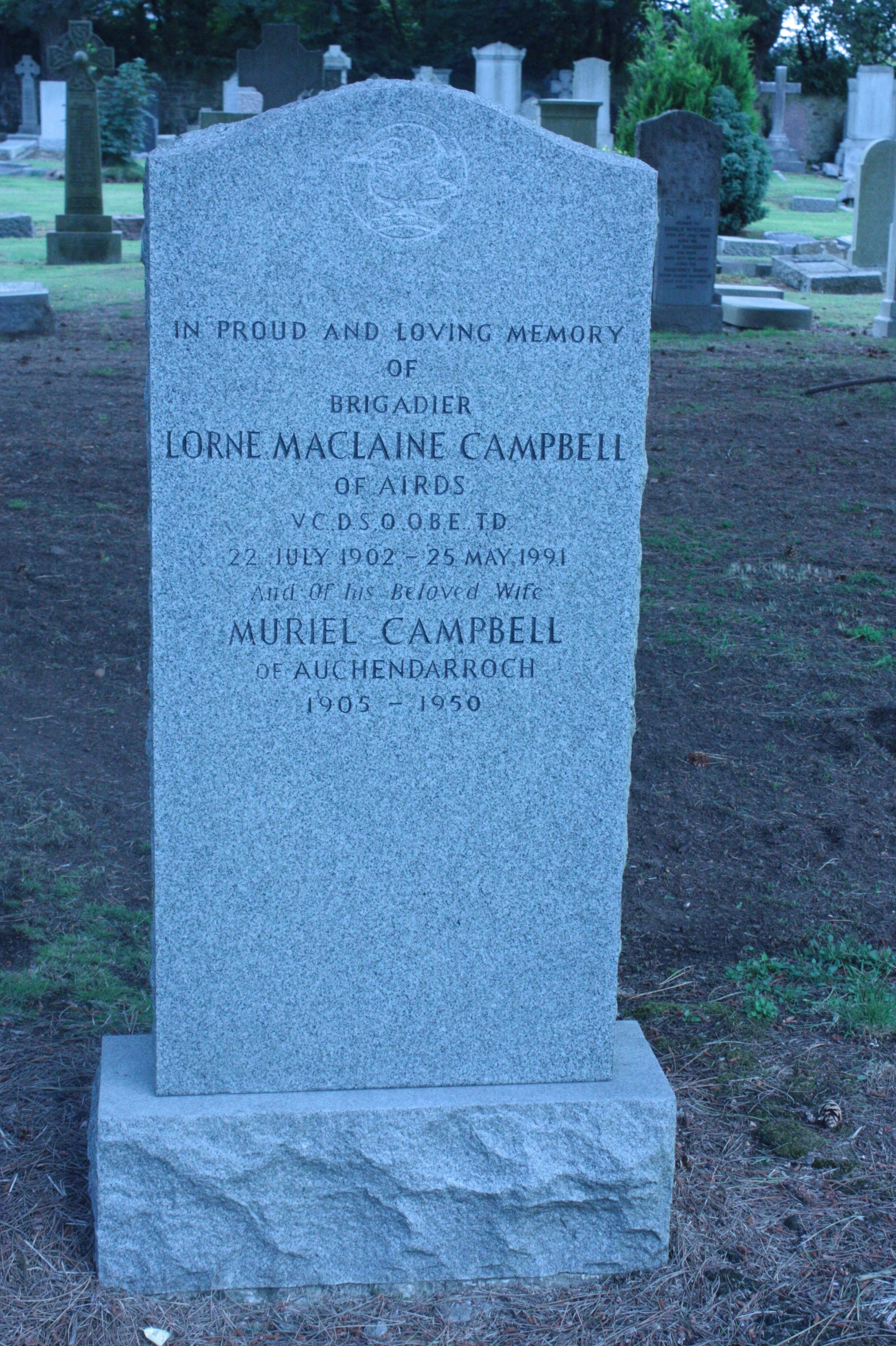
Lorne Campbell's grave, Warriston Cemetery.

In December 1935 Campbell married Amy Muriel Jordan Campbell, daughter of Alastair Campbell of Auchendarroch. The couple had two sons, Alastair Lorne Campbell of Airds (b. 1937) and Patrick Gordon Campbell (b. 1939).

Following demobilisation, Campbell returned to the wine trade, became a liveryman of the Vintners' Company, and was made an Officer of the Order of the British Empire (OBE) in 1968.

Campbell died at the Royal Victoria Hospital, Edinburgh on 25 May 1991, aged 88, and is buried in Warriston Cemetery in Edinburgh in the upper northern section. His medals are on display at the Argyll and Sutherland Highlanders Museum in Stirling Castle.

== Bibliography ==
- Buzzell, Nora, ed. (1997). The Register of the Victoria Cross (3rd ed.). Cheltenham, Gloucestershire: This England. ISBN 978-0-90632-427-1.
- Harvey, David (1999). Monuments to Courage. Weybridge, Surrey: Kevin & Kay Patience.
- Laffin, John (1997). British VCs of World War 2 – A Study in Heroism. Stroud, Gloucestershire: Sutton Publishing Ltd. ISBN 978-0-75091-026-2.
- Ross, Graham (1995). Scotland's Forgotten Valour. Isle of Skye: MacLean. ISBN 978-1-89927-200-6.
