= SM UC-29 =

German Type UC II minelaying U-boat

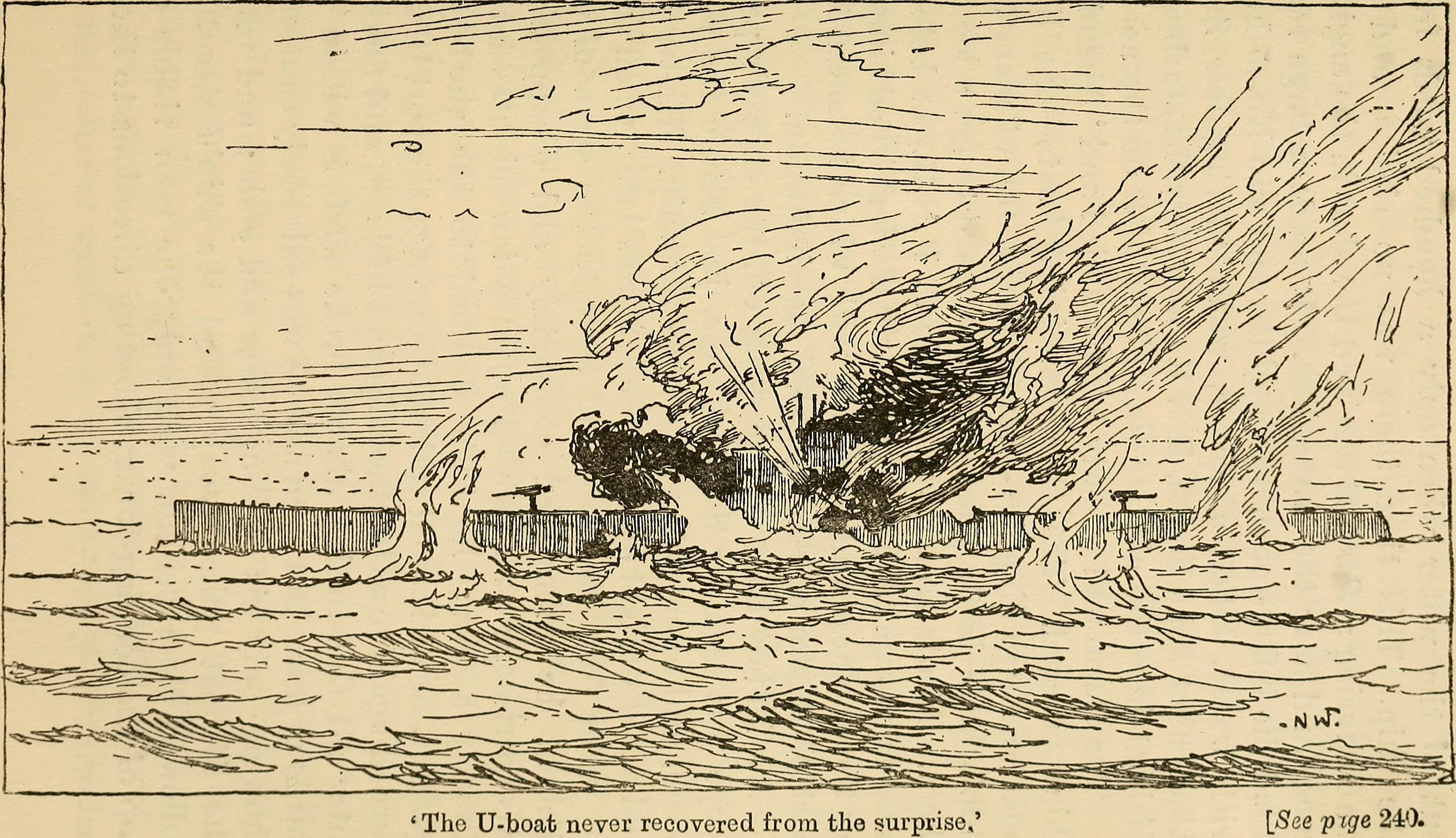
- UC-29 under attack by HMS Pargust

History

German Empire
- Name: UC-29
- Ordered: 29 August 1915
- Builder: AG Vulcan, Hamburg
- Yard number: 68
- Launched: 15 July 1916
- Commissioned: 15 August 1916
- Fate: Sunk, 7 June 1917

General characteristics
- Class & type: Type UC II submarine
- Displacement: 400 t (390 long tons), surfaced; 480 t (470 long tons), submerged
- Length: 49.45 m (162 ft 3 in) o/a; 39.30 m (128 ft 11 in) pressure hull
- Beam: 5.22 m (17 ft 2 in) o/a; 3.65 m (12 ft) pressure hull
- Draught: 3.68 m (12 ft 1 in)
- Propulsion: 2 × propeller shafts; 2 × 6-cylinder, 4-stroke diesel engines, 520 PS (380 kW; 510 bhp); 2 × electric motors, 460 PS (340 kW; 450 shp)
- Speed: 11.6 knots (21.5 km/h; 13.3 mph), surfaced; 6.7 knots (12.4 km/h; 7.7 mph), submerged
- Range: 9,410 nmi (17,430 km; 10,830 mi) at 7 knots (13 km/h; 8.1 mph), surfaced; 53 nmi (98 km; 61 mi) at 4 knots (7.4 km/h; 4.6 mph), submerged
- Test depth: 50 m (160 ft)
- Complement: 26
- Armament: 6 × 100 cm (39.4 in) mine tubes; 18 × UC 200 mines; 3 × 50 cm (19.7 in) torpedo tubes (2 bow/external; one stern); 7 × torpedoes; 1 × 8.8 cm (3.5 in) Uk L/30 deck gun
- Notes: 48-second diving time

Service record
- Part of: I Flotilla; 19 October 1916 – 7 June 1917
- Commanders: Oblt.z.S. Ernst Rosenow; 15 August 1916 – 7 June 1917
- Operations: 7 patrols
- Victories: 16 merchant ships sunk (21,469 GRT); 2 auxiliary warships sunk (440 GRT); 2 merchant ships damaged (13,042 GRT); 2 auxiliary warships damaged (4,112 GRT)

SM UC-29 was a German Type UC II minelaying submarine or U-boat in the German Imperial Navy (German: Kaiserliche Marine) during World War I. The U-boat was ordered on 29 August 1915 and was launched on 15 July 1916. She was commissioned into the German Imperial Navy on 15 August 1916 as SM UC-29. (Note: "SM" stands for "Seiner Majestät" (English: His Majesty's) and combined with the U for Unterseeboot would be translated as His Majesty's Submarine.) In an eight-month career, the UC-29 performed seven combat patrols into the Atlantic Ocean during the German war on Allied trade (Handelskrieg). In these patrols she was very successful, sinking 18 allied ships, totalling 21,909 GRT. She also damaged 4 ships of 17,154 GRT. On 7 June 1917 she torpedoed the British Q-ship HMS Pargust off the Irish coast, but was ambushed by her hidden armaments when she approached too close and was sunk with 23 hands. Pargust was commanded by British submarine hunter Gordon Campbell and had on board Ronald Niel Stuart and William Williams, who were awarded the Victoria Cross for their actions in the engagement.

Her wreck lies in Cork Harbour, Ireland.

== Design ==
A Type UC II submarine, UC-29 had a displacement of 400 tonnes (390 long tons) when at the surface and 480 tonnes (470 long tons) while submerged. She had a length overall of 49.45 m (162 ft 3 in), a beam of 5.22 m (17 ft 2 in), and a draught of 3.68 m (12 ft 1 in). The submarine was powered by two six-cylinder four-stroke diesel engines each producing 260 metric horsepower (190 kW; 260 shp) (a total of 520 metric horsepower (380 kW; 510 shp)), two electric motors producing 460 metric horsepower (340 kW; 450 shp), and two propeller shafts. She had a dive time of 48 seconds and was capable of operating at a depth of 50 metres (160 ft).

The submarine had a maximum surface speed of 11.6 knots (21.5 km/h; 13.3 mph) and a submerged speed of 6.7 knots (12.4 km/h; 7.7 mph). When submerged, she could operate for 53 nautical miles (98 km; 61 mi) at 4 knots (7.4 km/h; 4.6 mph); when surfaced, she could travel 9,410 nautical miles (17,430 km; 10,830 mi) at 7 knots (13 km/h; 8.1 mph). UC-29 was fitted with six 100 centimetres (39 in) mine tubes, eighteen UC 200 mines, three 50 centimetres (20 in) torpedo tubes (one on the stern and two on the bow), seven torpedoes, and one 8.8 cm (3.5 in) Uk L/30 deck gun. Her complement was twenty-six crew members.

== Summary of raiding history ==
Date	Name	Nationality	Tonnage (Note: Merchant ship tonnages are in gross register tons. Military vessels are listed by tons displacement.)	Fate
17 November 1916	Canganian	United Kingdom	1,143	Sunk
23 January 1917	Clan Shaw	United Kingdom	3,943	Sunk
24 January 1917	Sunniva	Norway	589	Sunk
5 February 1917	Primrose	United Kingdom	136	Sunk
9 February 1917	HMT Yesso	Royal Navy	229	Sunk
10 February 1917	San Fraterno	United Kingdom	9,587	Damaged
11 February 1917	Norwood	United Kingdom	798	Sunk
11 February 1917	Roanoke	United Kingdom	3,455	Damaged
1 March 1917	Herbert Ingram	United Kingdom	142	Sunk
1 March 1917	Redcap	United Kingdom	199	Sunk
3 March 1917	HMT Northumbria	Royal Navy	211	Sunk
14 March 1917	Storaas	Norway	3,041	Sunk
24 April 1917	Upton Castle	United Kingdom	145	Sunk
27 April 1917	Nidelven	Norway	1,262	Sunk
27 April 1917	Ragnhild	Norway	1,117	Sunk
29 April 1917	Carbo I	Denmark	1,385	Sunk
1 May 1917	Firelight	United Kingdom	1,143	Sunk
3 June 1917	Elisabeth	France	2,061	Sunk
3 June 1917	HMS Mavis	Royal Navy	1,295	Damaged
4 June 1917	Songvand	Norway	2,206	Sunk
7 June 1917	HMS Pargust	Royal Navy	2,817	Damaged
3 August 1917	Hornchurch	United Kingdom	2,159	Sunk
