= Mill Cove, County Cork =

Small bay in Ireland

Coordinates: 51.558°N 9.044°W

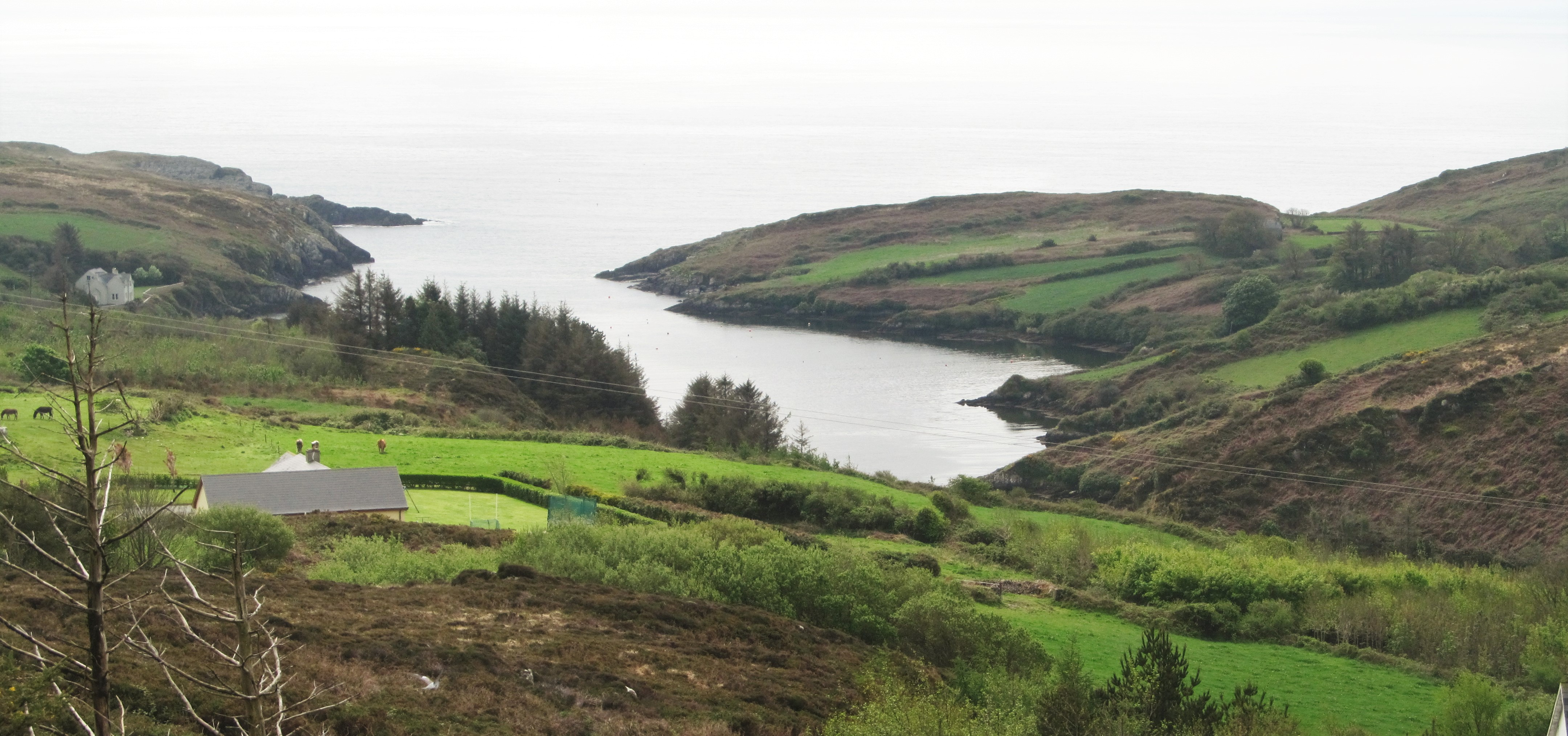
Mill Cove

Mill Cove is a small sea inlet in County Cork, Ireland. It lies approximately three kilometers to the south of the village of Rosscarbery and to the east of Glandore. The inlet has, on its eastern side, a small wharf. The Q-ship HMS Farnborough was beached near the cove in 1917.

Approximately one kilometer upstream on the Roury River, which flows into the cove, is the ruined fortified house of Coppinger's Court. There is a Napoleonic-era signal tower in nearby Downeen townland.
