= Ian Campbell (Middlesex cricketer) =

English cricketer

Ian Maxwell Campbell (3 October 1870 – 6 March 1954) was an English first-class cricketer active 1900–02 who played for Middlesex and London County. He was born in Kensington; died in Amersham. He served in the Territorial Force from 1894 to 1907 and then on the western front with the Argyll and Sutherland Highlanders, reaching the rank of lieutenant-colonel by the time he retired in 1929, when he was appointed Honorary Colonel of the 8th Battalion. His father, Frederick Campbell, was also a first-class cricketer.

He was appointed a Commander of the Order of the British Empire (CBE) in the 1927 Birthday Honours.
