= HMS Dunraven =

Coordinates: 48°36′18″N 5°24′36″W

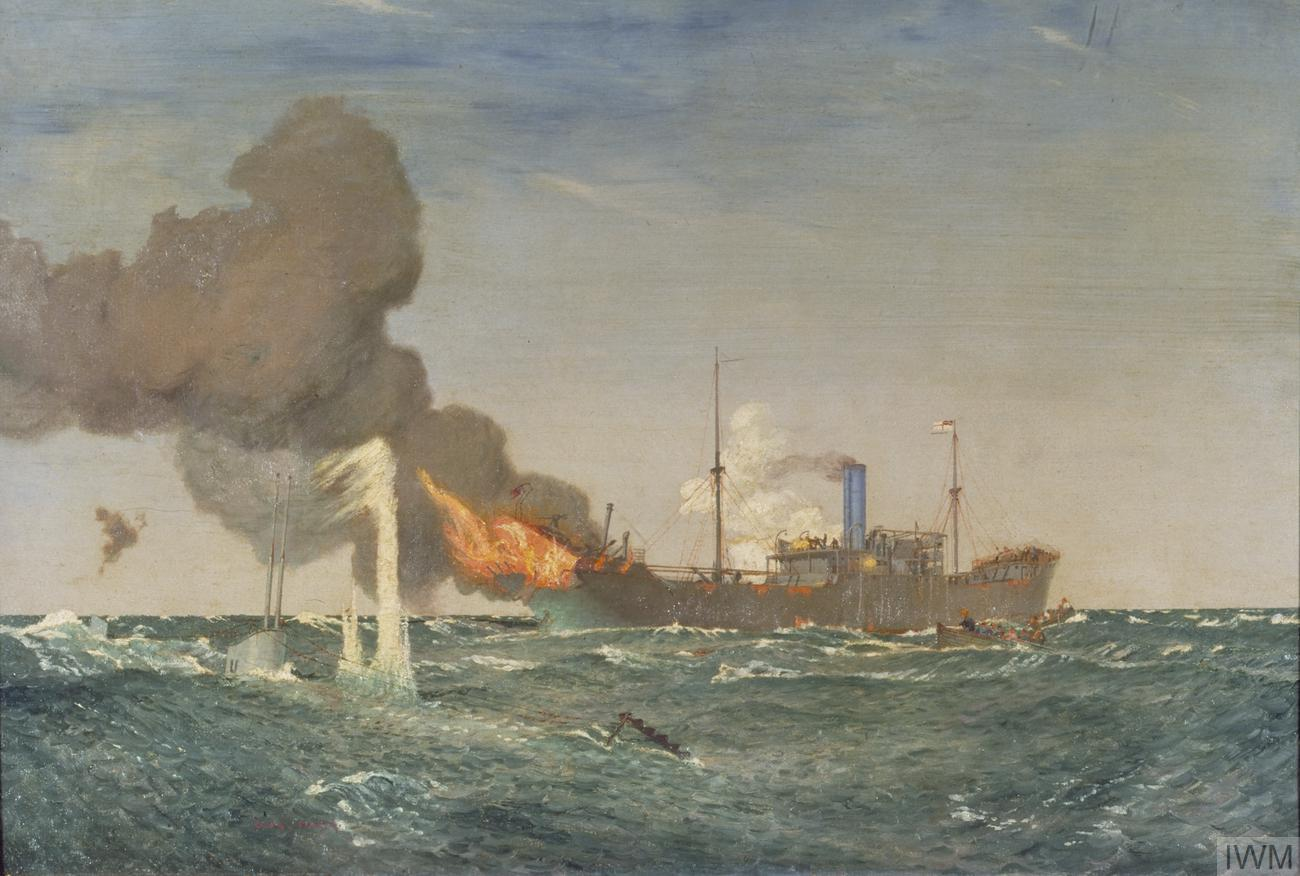
- "HMS Dunraven" by Charles Pears

History

United Kingdom
- Name: HMS Dunraven
- Launched: 7 December 1909
- Fate: Sunk, 10 August 1917

General characteristics
- Type: Q-ship
- Displacement: 3,100 long tons (3,150 t)
- Armament: 1 × 4 in (100 mm) gun; 4 × 12-pounder guns; 2 × 14 in (356 mm) torpedo tubes

HMS Dunraven was a Q-ship of the Royal Navy during World War I.

On 8 August 1917, 130 miles southwest of Ushant in the Bay of Biscay, disguised as the collier Boverton and commanded by Gordon Campbell, VC, Dunraven spotted UC-71, commanded by Oberleutnant zur See Reinhold Saltzwedel. Saltzwedel believed the disguised ship was a merchant vessel. The U-boat submerged and closed with Dunraven before surfacing astern at 11:43 am and opening fire at long range. Dunraven made smoke and sent off a panic party (a small number of men who "abandon ship" during an attack to continue the impersonation of a merchant).

Shells began hitting Dunraven, detonating her depth charges and setting her stern afire. Her crew remained hidden letting the fires burn. Then a 4-inch (102 mm) gun and crew were blown away revealing Dunraven's identity as a warship, and UC-71 submerged. A second "panic party" abandoned ship. Dunraven was hit by a torpedo. A third "panic party" went over the side, leaving only two guns manned. UC-71 surfaced, shelled Dunraven and again submerged. Campbell replied with two torpedoes that missed, and around 3 pm, the undamaged U-boat left that area. Only one of Dunraven's crew was killed, but the Q-Ship was sinking.

The British destroyer HMS Christopher picked up Dunraven's survivors and took her in tow for Plymouth, but Dunraven sank at 1:30 am early on 10 August 1917 to the north of Ushant.

In recognition, two Victoria Crosses were awarded, one to the ship's First Lieutenant, Lt. Charles George Bonner RNR, and the other, by ballot, to a gunlayer, Petty Officer Ernest Herbert Pitcher.

Captain Campbell later wrote:

"It had been a fair and honest fight, and I lost it. Referring to my crew, words cannot express what I am feeling. No one let me down. No one could have done better."

Captain Campbell had been previously awarded the Victoria Cross, in February 1917, for the sinking of U-83.
