= HMS Farnborough =

History

United Kingdom
- Name: Loderer
- Builder: John Priestman & Co., Sunderland
- Launched: 5 December 1903
- Fate: Requisitioned by the Royal Navy in 1915 and converted to Q-ship

United Kingdom
- Name: HMS Farnborough
- Namesake: Farnborough
- Commissioned: 1915
- In service: 1915-1919
- Fate: Sold 1919; Scrapped 1928

General characteristics
- Type: Q-ship
- Tonnage: 3,207 GRT
- Propulsion: steam turbines
- Speed: 11 knots
- Armament: 2 × QF 6 pounder Nordenfelt; 5 × 12-pounder; 1 × Maxim gun

HMS Farnborough, also known as (Q-5), was a Q-ship of the British Royal Navy that saw service in the First World War. Farnborough was a heavily armed merchant ship with concealed weaponry that was designed to lure submarines into making surface attacks. Farnborough sank two submarines in her service in the First World War. The first submarine was SM U-68 which involved the first successful use of depth charges. The second submarine was SM U-83, which was sunk on 17 February 1917 in an action for which Captain Gordon Campbell of Farnborough received the Victoria Cross. HMS Farnborough was severely damaged in the action and was beached the same day.

== Construction and design ==
Farnborough, of 3207-gross registered tons, was originally constructed as a collier in 1904 under the name Loderer. She had no fixed port and as such was often referred to as a tramp steamer. The Royal Navy converted her into a Q-ship at HMNB Devonport, arming her with five 12-pounder guns, two 6-pounders, and a Maxim gun. Flaps or dummy compartments on the ship concealed the 12-pounder guns. The 6-pounders were hidden at either end of the bridge and the Maxim was in the middle of the ship. She was renamed the Farnborough en route to her first command.

== First World War ==
=== SM U-68 ===
Farnborough came into contact with SM U-68 off Britain's west coast on 22 March 1916. At approximately 07:00, U-68 fired a torpedo at Farnborough that narrowly missed the ship's bow. Farnborough continued the deception of being a merchant ship and continued at her same speed and course. At 07:20, U-68 surfaced about 1,000 yd (910 m) astern of Farnborough, moved to the ship's port quarter, and fired a shot across the Q-ship's bow. Farnborough stopped, blew off steam, and launched a boat to simulate a surrender. As U-68 closed to 800 yd (730 m), Farnborough raised the British White Ensign, uncovered her guns and opened fire with three of her five 12-pounder guns. The British gunners scored several hits on the U-boat out of 21 rapidly fired rounds. As U-68 began to sink, Campbell steered Farnborough over U-68's location and dropped a depth charge that blew the bow of the submarine out of the water. This was the first use of the depth charge in action. As U-68 began going down by the stern, Farnborough's gunners scored another five hits on the U-boat's conning tower. U-68 sank at position 51°54′N 10°53′W off Dingle in southern Ireland, with the loss of her entire crew of 38 men.

Soon after this action Farnborough received a new executive officer in Ronald Niel Stuart (who would go on to be awarded a Victoria Cross for actions on a separate Q-ship, Pargust). Stuart's experience in merchant shipping proved invaluable to his work and he soon had the crew of Farnborough disciplined and the ship well maintained and run. The captain, Campbell, declared himself very pleased with his executive officer, declaring him "on the top line". The ship did not see any action for almost 11 months after sinking U-68. In February 1917, Campbell decided that in order to properly invite an attack, Farnborough would have allow herself to be torpedoed and then engage the submarine as the submarine closed to finish the job with shellfire.

=== SM U-83 ===
On 17 February 1917, this theory was proven correct off Southern Ireland when the lone Farnborough was struck by a torpedo fired at extreme range. Campbell intentionally failed to evade the missile and the ship took the blow in the hold, causing some minor injuries to the crew but serious damage to the ship. The crew were well rehearsed and the "panic party" took to their boats with a great show of alarm and disorder while the gun crews manned positions on their hidden weapons. When four lifeboats had been released and the ship had settled in the water and was clearly sinking, the submarine U-83 pulled up just 10 yd (9.1 m) from the wreck. Farnborough's remaining crew then fired their six-pounder gun and several machine guns into the stationary submarine. The very first shot decapitated the German captain Bruno Hoppe, and the U-boat was rapidly reduced to a battered wreck. Eight German sailors escaped the submarine before it sank but only two could be pulled from the water, one of whom subsequently died of his wounds.

Farnborough was also sinking from her torpedo damage. Realising this, Campbell left the men in the boats, destroyed all confidential papers, and radioed for help. His unorthodox message read: "Q5 slowly sinking respectfully wishes you goodbye". This message reached nearby naval shipping, and within an hour the destroyer Narwhal and the sloop Buttercup arrived and began to tow the stricken ship back to land. During the night a depth charge accidentally exploded on board Farnborough and she dropped the tow. Campbell ordered the 12 men remaining aboard into a lifeboat and attempted to take a final survey of his vessel, only to be driven back by another exploding depth charge. On returning to the rail he discovered that Stuart had disobeyed his order and remained on board, to make sure his captain disembarked safely. The tow was later reattached and the battered Farnborough beached at Mill Cove. Campbell was awarded the Victoria Cross in recognition of his service in the action and £1,000 of prize money was shared among the crew. Stuart and Engineer-Lieutenant Len Loveless were both presented with the Distinguished Service Order. The vast majority of the crew went on to serve on Pargust where Stuart was to earn his Victoria Cross. The admiralty purchased the vessel on 22 October 1917 and sold her for commercial service in April 1919 as Hollypark. She was scrapped in 1928 at Briton Ferry.
