= HMS Narwhal (1915) =

British M-Class destroyer, WW1

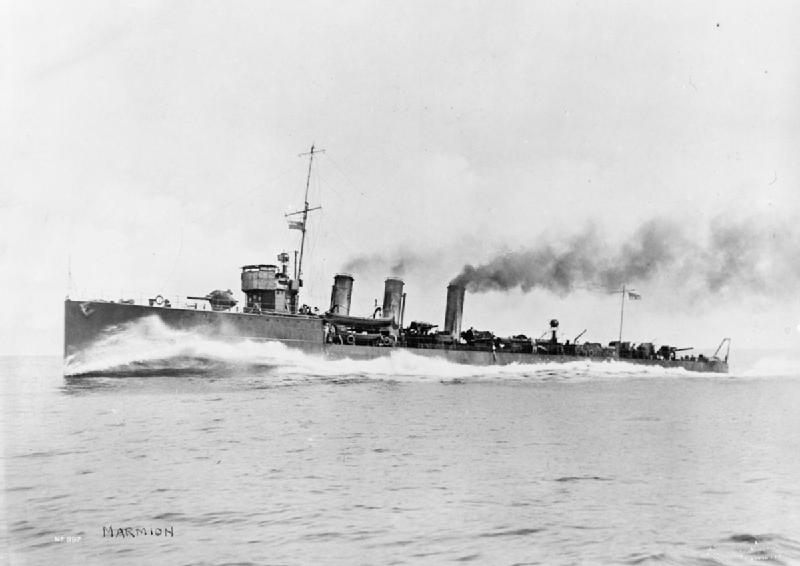
- Sister ship HMS Marmion

History

United Kingdom
- Name: HMS Narwhal
- Namesake: Narwhal
- Ordered: February 1915
- Builder: William Denny and Brothers, Dumbarton
- Yard number: 1046
- Laid down: 21 April 1915
- Launched: 30 December 1915
- Completed: 3 March 1916
- Fate: Sold to be broken up 1920

General characteristics
- Class & type: Admiralty M-class destroyer
- Displacement: 994 long tons (1,010 t) (normal); 1,025 long tons (1,041 t) (full load)
- Length: 265 ft (80.8 m) (p.p.)
- Beam: 26 ft 8 in (8.1 m)
- Draught: 9 ft 3 in (2.82 m)
- Installed power: 3 Yarrow boilers, 25,000 shp (19,000 kW)
- Propulsion: Parsons steam turbines, 3 shafts
- Speed: 34 knots (63 km/h; 39 mph)
- Range: 3,450 nmi (6,390 km; 3,970 mi) at 15 kn (28 km/h; 17 mph)
- Complement: 76
- Armament: 3 × single QF 4-inch (102 mm) Mark IV guns; 2 × single 2-pdr 40 mm (2 in) AA guns; 2 × twin 21 in (533 mm) torpedo tubes

HMS Narwhal was a Admiralty M-class destroyer which served with the Royal Navy during the First World War. The M class were an improvement on the preceding L class, capable of higher speed. Launched on 30 December 1915, the vessel fought in the Battle of Jutland between 31 May and 1 June 1916 and subsequently served in anti-submarine and escort duties based at Cobh in Ireland. During February 1917, the destroyer rescued the crew of the Q-ship Farnborough, which had sunk and been sunk by the German submarine SM U-83, and rescued the armed merchantman Cameronia from SM U-50, The destroyer was transferred to Devonport during 1918 and, after the end of the war, was broken up there in 1920 after suffering a fatal collision the year before.

== Design and development ==
Narwhal was one of sixteen Admiralty M-class destroyers ordered by the British Admiralty in February 1915 as part of the Fourth War Construction Programme. The M-class was an improved version of the earlier L-class destroyers, required to reach a higher speed in order to counter rumoured German fast destroyers. The remit was to have a maximum speed of 36 knots (67 km/h; 41 mph) and, although the eventual design did not achieve this, the greater performance was appreciated by the navy. It transpired that the German ships did not exist.

The destroyer was 265 ft (80.8 m) long between perpendiculars, with a beam of 26 ft 8 in (8.1 m) and a draught of 9 ft 3 in (2.8 m). Displacement was 994 long tons (1,010 t) normal and 1,025 long tons (1,041 t) full load. Power was provided by three Yarrow boilers feeding Parsons steam turbines rated at 25,000 shaft horsepower (19,000 kW) and driving three shafts, to give a design speed of 34 knots (63 km/h; 39 mph). The ship achieved 34.25 kn (63.43 km/h; 39.41 mph) during trials. Three funnels were fitted. A fuel load of 296 long tons (301 t) of oil was carried, giving a design range of 3,450 nautical miles (6,390 km; 3,970 mi) at 15 kn (28 km/h; 17 mph).

Armament consisted of three single QF 4-inch (100 mm) Mk IV guns on the ship's centreline, with one on the forecastle, one aft on a raised platform and one between the middle and aft funnels. Two single QF 2-pounder 40 mm (2 in) "pom-pom" anti-aircraft guns were carried, while torpedo armament consisted of two twin rotating mounts for 21 in (533 mm) torpedoes. The ship had a complement of 76 officers and ratings.

== Construction and career ==
Narwhal was laid down by William Denny and Brothers of Dumbarton on 21 April 1915 with the yard number 1046, launched on 30 December and completed on 3 March the following year. The ship was named after the toothed whale. The vessel was deployed as part of the Grand Fleet, joining the Twelfth Destroyer Flotilla.

Between 31 May and 1 June 1916, Narwhal sailed as part of the Flotilla, led by the flotilla leader HMS Faulknor to confront the German High Seas Fleet in the Battle of Jutland. The ship managed to launch two torpedoes from her port side against the German Fleet, but both missed.

In February 1917, the destroyer was transferred to Cobh, Ireland, to counter increasing activity by German submarines in the Southwest Approaches. The submarines had been very active and the Royal Navy had resorted to introducing Q-ships to try and ambush them. On 17 February, Narwhal was called upon to rescue the crew of one of these ships, HMS Farnborough, which was sunk by and sank SM U-83. Nine days later, the ship chased away SM U-50 from attacking the armed merchantman Cameronia. Escort duties continued, including accompanying convoys to Liverpool from 27 March.

During 1918, Narwhal was transferred to Devonport as part of the Fourth Destroyer Flotilla. After the Armistice of 11 November 1918 that ended the war, the destroyer remained in Devonport and, shortly afterwards, joined the local defence flotilla at the base. Narwhal was damaged in a collision in 1919 and returned to Devonport to be broken up the following year. The vessel's name was subsequently used by two submarines that served with the Royal Navy.

== Pennant numbers ==
| Pennant number | Date |
|---|---|
| G47 | September 1915 |
| G36 | January 1917 |
| G35 | January 1918 |
| H29 | June 1918 |
| F91 | January 1919 |
