= James Thompson (VC) =

English recipient of the Victoria Cross

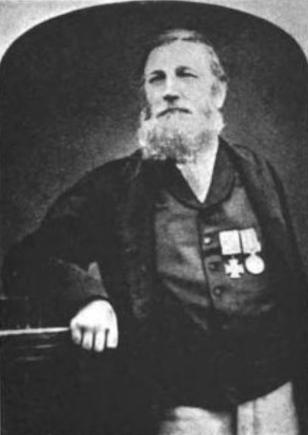
- Born: c. 1830; Yoxall, Staffordshire, England
- Died: 5 December 1891 (aged 60–61); Walsall, England
- Burial place: Queen Street Cemetery, Walsall
- Military career
- Allegiance: United Kingdom
- Branch: British Army
- Rank: Private
- Units: 60th Rifles
- Conflicts: Indian Mutiny
- Awards: Victoria Cross

William James Thompson VC (c. 1830 – 5 December 1891) was an English recipient of the Victoria Cross, the highest and most prestigious award for gallantry in the face of the enemy that can be awarded to British and Commonwealth forces.

== Details ==
Thompson was about 27 years old, and a private in the 1st Battalion, 60th Rifles (King's Royal Rifle Corps), British Army during the Indian Mutiny when the following deed took place on 9 July 1857 at Delhi, British India

For gallant conduct in saving the life of his captain (Captain Wilton), on the 9th of July, 1857, by dashing forward to his relief, when that officer was surrounded by a party of Ghazees, who made a sudden rush on him, from a serai - and killing two of them before further assistance could reach. Also recommended for conspicuous conduct throughout the siege.

Thompson was one of five men of the 1/60th elected under Section 13 of the Royal Warrant to receive the Victoria Cross for the Siege of Delhi. Two months later he was badly wounded in the assault on Delhi on 14 September 1857, the opening day of the battle that lasted until 20 September 1857 when the city was cleared of insurgents. His left arm was amputated and he was invalided out of the Army. The citation, published in the London Gazette of 20 January 1860, concludes with a commendation for his 'conspicuous conduct throughout the siege'. The citation does not specify Delhi and some sources have interpreted the siege to be the more famous Siege of Lucknow although Thompson was not at Lucknow. The 1/60th was part of the Siege of Delhi, the other four 1/60th citations do state Delhi and the action saving the life of Captain Wilton on 9 July 1857 occurred at Delhi. Thompson was at Delhi between July and September 1857 by which time he had been severely wounded and saw no further active service.

== Memorials ==
His Victoria Cross is displayed at the Royal Green Jackets (Rifles) Museum in Winchester, England. In December 2009, a memorial plaque to Thompson and two other recipients of the Victoria Cross, John Henry Carless and Charles George Bonner, was unveiled at the Town Hall in Walsall, England.

There is a small memorial plaque in St Peter's Church, Yoxall, Staffordshire. It reads:

Commemorating the valiant deeds of JAMES THOMPSON who was born in Yoxall in 1833[sic]. Served in the 1st Battalion 60th Rifles and was awarded the Victoria Cross in 1857 for his gallant conduct during the Indian Mutiny.
