= HMS Parthian (1916) =

British M-Class destroyer, WW1

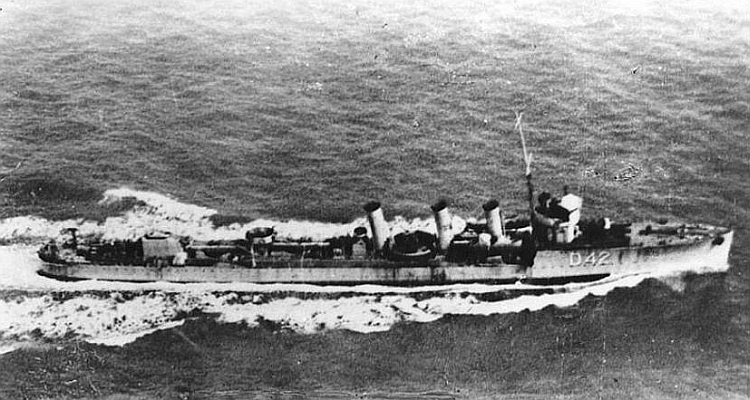
- Sister ship HMS Pasley

History

United Kingdom
- Name: HMS Parthian
- Namesake: Parthian
- Ordered: February 1915
- Builder: Scotts, Greenock
- Yard number: 472
- Launched: 3 July 1916
- Completed: 7 September 1916
- Decommissioned: 8 November 1921
- Fate: Sold to be broken up in Germany

General characteristics
- Class & type: Admiralty M-class destroyer
- Displacement: 994 long tons (1,010 t) normal; 1,025 long tons (1,041 t) full load
- Length: 265 ft (80.8 m)
- Beam: 26 ft 8 in (8.1 m)
- Draught: 9 ft 3 in (2.82 m)
- Propulsion: 3 Yarrow boilers; 2 Brown-Curtis steam turbines, 25,000 shp (19,000 kW)
- Speed: 34 kn (39 mph; 63 km/h)
- Range: 3,450 nmi (6,390 km) at 15 kn (28 km/h)
- Complement: 76
- Armament: 3 × QF 4-inch (102 mm) Mark IV guns (3×1); 1 × single 2-pounder (40-mm) "pom-pom" Mk. II anti-aircraft gun (1×1); 4 × 21 in (533 mm) torpedo tubes (2×2)

HMS Parthian was a Admiralty M-class destroyer which served with the Royal Navy during the First World War. The M class were an improvement on the previous L-class destroyer, capable of higher speed. Launched on 3 July 1916, the ship was transferred to the Southwest Approaches during February 1917 to undertake anti-submarine and escort duties initially based from Cobh in Ireland. The vessel attacked a number of German U-boats that were sinking shipping in the area, and was part of the welcome for the first destroyers from the US Navy to serve in Europe during the war. After the Armistice of 11 November 1918, the ship was placed in reserve before being decommissioned and sold to be broken up on 8 November 1921.

== Design and development ==
Parthian was one of sixteen Admiralty M-class destroyers ordered by the British Admiralty in February 1915 as part of the Fourth War Construction Programme. The M-class was an improved version of the earlier L-class destroyers, designed to reach the higher speed of 36 knots (67 km/h; 41 mph) in order to counter rumoured German fast destroyers.

The destroyer was 265 feet (80.8 m) long overall, with a beam of 26 ft 8 in (8.1 m) and a draught of 9 ft 3 in (2.8 m). displacement was 994 long tons (1,010 t) normal and 1,025 long tons (1,041 t) full load. Power was provided by three Yarrow boilers feeding two Brown-Curtis steam turbines rated at 25,000 shaft horsepower (19,000 kW) and driving two shafts, to give a design speed of 34 kn (63 km/h; 39 mph). Three funnels were fitted. 296 long tons (301 t) of oil were carried, giving a design range of 3,450 nautical miles (6,390 km; 3,970 mi) at 15 kn (28 km/h; 17 mph).

Armament consisted of three 4 in (102 mm) Mk IV QF guns on the ship's centreline, with one on the forecastle, one aft on a raised platform and one between the middle and aft funnels. A single 2-pounder (40 mm) pom-pom anti-aircraft gun was carried, while torpedo armament consisted of two twin mounts for 21 in (533 mm) torpedoes. The vessel had a complement of 76 officers and ratings.

== Construction and career ==
Parthian was laid down by Scotts Shipbuilding and Engineering Company of Greenock with the yard number 472, launched on 3 July 1916 and completed on 7 September. The ship was named after Parthia, a belligerent nation found on the southeast of the Caspian Sea. The vessel was deployed as part of the Grand Fleet, joining the Fifteenth Destroyer Flotilla.

During February 1917, in response to increasing submarine activity in the Southwest Approaches, Parthian was one of four destroyers from the Grand Fleet allocated to Cobh, Ireland. On 10 March, the destroyer assisted SS Arataca in its defence from the submarine SM U-44, driving the submarine away. On 29 April, the vessel pressed home an attack on an unidentified submarine, using gunfire and depth charges as well as attempting the ram the boat as it dived. On 2 May the destroyer was sent out to meet a division of US Navy destroyers led by Commander Joseph Taussig in USS Wainwright. They were the first vessels sent by the US to Europe. On 30 May, the destroyer unsuccessfully attacked SM U-55, although a prisoner from the merchant ship SS Clan Murray onboard the submarine claimed that the boat had been hit. However, the hard toll of working under these conditions took their toll and by 18 June, the ship had been transferred to Newport, Wales for rest and refitting. One of the destroyer's attacks was used by Admiral Sir Lewis Bayly in an address to American seamen:

This destroyer [Parthian] proceeded to sea. The night came on and just before nightfall a submarine rose to the surface of the sea 150 yards ahead The watchful eyes of the crew saw her instantly: the watchful commander drove his vessel at her, and the watchful and ready-gun's crew opened fire instantly. The submarine was struck eight or ten times in the space of a minute. Her tower was shot up, and she rolled over and sank at once. I cite this to show that in a space of perhaps two or three minutes a submarine was destroyed. If vigilance was lacking, the opportunity would have been lost.

After the Armistice of 11 November 1918 the Royal Navy returned to a peacetime level of mobilisation, and surplus vessels were placed in reserve. Parthian was initially transferred to Devonport on 15 October 1919, joining what would become more than twenty M class destroyers being made ready for retirement. The destroyer was decommissioned and sold to Slough Trading Co on 8 November 1921, being subsequently broken up in Germany.

== Pennant numbers ==
Pennant number	Date
G52	September 1915
G77	January 1917
H91	January 1918
