= Gordon Campbell (Royal Navy officer) =

Royal Navy admiral (1886-1953)

Vice-Admiral Gordon Campbell VC DSO & Two Bars
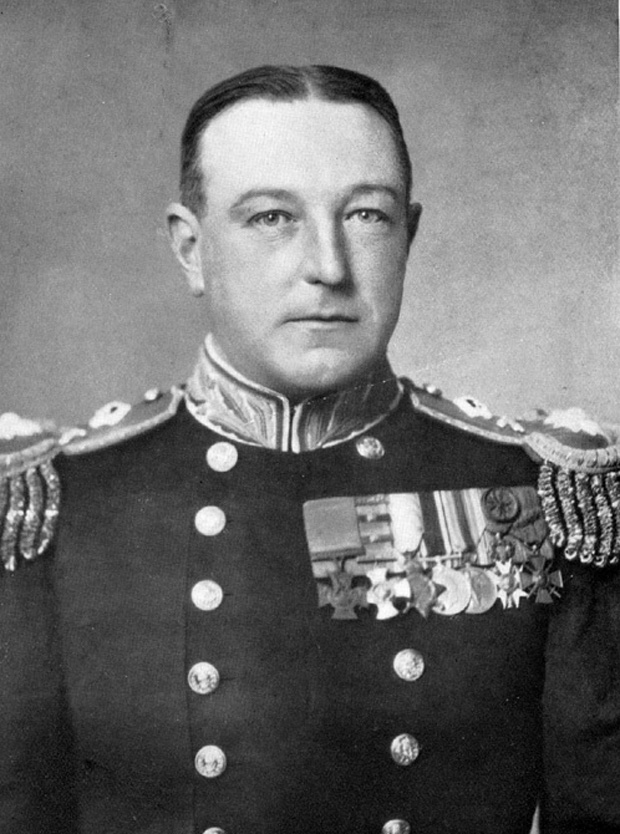
- Captain Gordon Campbell
- Born: 6 January 1886; Croydon, Surrey
- Died: 3 October 1953 (aged 67); Isleworth, Middlesex
- Burial place: All Saints Churchyard, Crondall
- Relatives: Sir Edward Campbell, 1st Baronet (brother); Brigadier Lorne MacLaine Campbell VC (nephew); Colonel Fredrick C.B. Campbell (father)
- Military career
- Allegiance: United Kingdom
- Branch: Royal Navy
- Service years: 1900–1929; 1939–1943
- Rank: Vice-Admiral
- Commands: HMS Tiger (1925–27); HM Dockyard, Simon's Town (1922–25); HMS Impregnable (1921–22); HMS Cumberland (1919–20); HMS Patrol (1918–19); HMS Active (1917–18); HMS Dunraven (1917); HMS Farnborough (1915–17)
- Conflicts: First World War; Second World War
- Awards: Victoria Cross; Distinguished Service Order & Two Bars; Knight of the Legion of Honour (France); Croix de Guerre (France)
- Other work: Member of Parliament; Writer

Vice-Admiral Gordon Campbell, VC, DSO & Two Bars (6 January 1886 – 3 October 1953) was a British naval officer, writer, politician and a recipient of the Victoria Cross, the highest award for gallantry in the face of the enemy that can be awarded to British and Commonwealth forces. He was also awarded the Croix de Guerre and appointed a chevalier of the Légion d'honneur for his actions during the First World War.

== Early life and career ==
Born on 6 January 1886 to Frederick Campbell, he was educated at Dulwich College Preparatory School (Dulwich Prep London) before moving to Dulwich College, which he attended between 1898 and 1900. He then enlisted the Royal Navy as a cadet and was in October 1902 posted as a midshipman to the battleship HMS Irresistible serving in the Mediterranean Sea. He was promoted to Sub-lieutenant in 1905, lieutenant in 1907 and commander in March 1916. It was during the First World War that he was awarded the Victoria Cross for the following action: After, he was promoted to Captain on the 7th June 1917, and was awarded his Victoria Cross in 1918.

On 17 February 1917 in the north Atlantic, Commander Campbell, commanding HMS Farnborough (Q.5) (one of the "mystery" Q ships) sighted a torpedo track. He altered course and allowed the torpedo to hit Q.5 aft by the engine-room bulkhead. The 'Panic party' got away convincingly, followed by the U-boat. When the submarine had fully surfaced and was within 100 yards of Q.5—badly damaged and now lying very low in the water—the commander gave the order to fire. Almost all of the 45 shells fired hit the SM U-83 which sank. Q.5 was taken in tow just in time and was safely beached. On 22 March 1916, another U-boat, SM U-68 was sunk by Farnborough.

Campbell also commanded HMS Dunraven during the action of 8 August 1917 when she was sunk by SM UC-71. Victoria Crosses were awarded to two members of the crew who were selected by ballot from amongst the crew of Dunraven, Lieutenant Charles George Bonner and Petty Officer Ernest Herbert Pitcher. Campbell received his second Bar to his Distinguished Service Order (DSO).

== Later life ==
Campbell later achieved the rank of vice admiral. He commanded the battlecruiser HMS Tiger from 1925 to 1927 and served as Naval Aide-de-Camp to George V from 1928 to 1929. In 1931, he was elected as National Member of Parliament for Burnley, defeating the Labour leader, Arthur Henderson. In 1935, however, standing as a Liberal National, he lost his seat.

In the Second World War, Campbell was recalled to the Royal Navy and, serving in the rank of commander, was responsible for anti-invasion measures around Padstow.

Campbell wrote several publications, including the successful My Mystery Ships. His brother, Sir Edward Campbell, 1st Baronet, was also a Member of Parliament.

His Victoria Cross is held at his old school, Dulwich College.

Parliament of the United Kingdom
Preceded by Arthur Henderson	Member of Parliament for Burnley; 1931–1935	Succeeded by Wilfrid Burke
