= Charles George Bonner =

English recipient of the Victoria Cross

Captain Charles George Bonner VC DSC
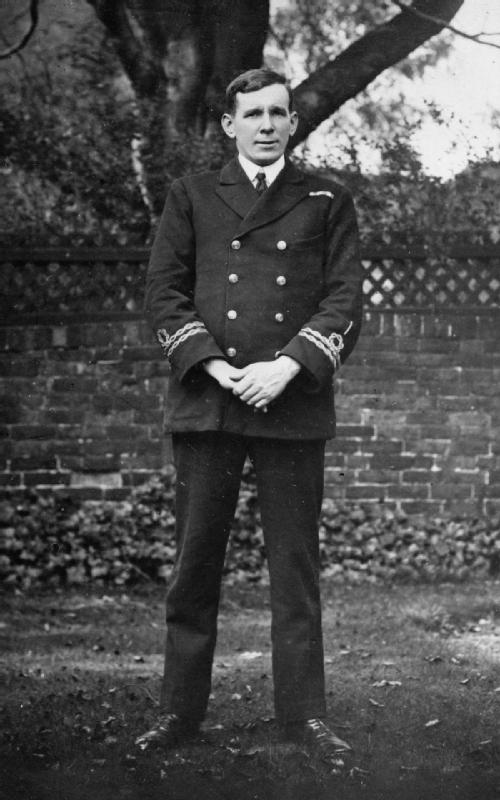
- Lieutenant Charles Bonner c.1917
- Born: 29 December 1884; Shuttington, Warwickshire
- Died: 7 February 1951 (aged 66); Edinburgh, Scotland
- Military career
- Allegiance: United Kingdom
- Branch: Royal Navy
- Rank: Lieutenant
- Units: HMS Dunraven
- Conflicts: First World War
- Awards: Victoria Cross; Distinguished Service Cross
- Other work: Marine salvage expert

Charles George Bonner, VC, DSC (29 December 1884 – 7 February 1951) was an English recipient of the Victoria Cross, the highest award for gallantry in the face of the enemy that can be awarded to British and Commonwealth forces.

On 8 August 1917 in the Bay of Biscay, Atlantic, Lieutenant Bonner, now a lieutenant in the Royal Naval Reserve, was with HMS Dunraven (one of the 'Q' or 'mystery' ships playing the part of an unobservant merchantman) when she was shelled by an enemy submarine. The lieutenant was in the thick of the fighting and throughout the whole of the action his pluck and determination had a considerable influence on the crew. For his actions, Bonner was awarded the Victoria Cross. Ernest Herbert Pitcher also received the Victoria Cross for his involvement.

He later achieved the rank of captain in the Merchant Navy.

== Memorials ==
Bonner, who died at home in Edinburgh in 1951 aged 66, was cremated at Warriston Crematorium. His ashes were buried in St Mary's Churchyard, Aldridge, his birthplace, in the West Midlands.

In November 2007, a commemorative plaque to Captain Bonner was unveiled in Aldridge, where his life, bravery and achievements are specifically celebrated in the annual Remembrance Day parade.

In December 2009, a memorial plaque to Bonner and two other recipients of the Victoria Cross, James Thompson and John Henry Carless, was unveiled at the Town Hall in Walsall, England.
