= William Williams (VC) =

Welsh Victoria Cross holder (1890–1965)

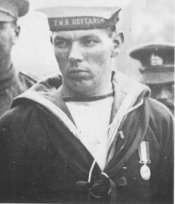
- Born: 5 October 1890; Amlwch, Anglesey, Wales
- Died: 22 October 1965 (aged 75); Holyhead, Anglesey, Wales
- Military career
- Allegiance: United Kingdom
- Branch: Royal Navy
- Rank: Seaman
- Units: Royal Naval Reserve
- Conflicts: World War I
- Awards: Victoria Cross; Distinguished Service Medal & Bar

William Williams VC, DSM & Bar (5 October 1890 – 22 October 1965), was a Welsh recipient of the Victoria Cross, the highest and most prestigious award for gallantry in the face of the enemy that can be awarded to a member of the British and Commonwealth armed forces.

He was from Amlwch on Anglesey and at age 26 was serving as a seaman in the Royal Naval Reserve during the First World War when the following deed took place:

- On 7 June 1917, HMS Pargust (a Q ship) was out in the Atlantic Ocean when her engine room was damaged by a torpedo fired from the U-boat SM UC-29. The explosion loosened the gun covers and Seaman Williams, with great presence of mind, took the whole weight on himself and physically prevented the covers from falling and betraying the ship to the enemy.

The Pargust's 'panic party', the decoy crew carried on every Q ship for the purpose of leaving it apparently abandoned when attacked, took to the lifeboats and the U-boat then surfaced, believing the Pargust to be a crewless and defenceless merchant vessel. When the U-boat was about 50 yards (46 m) away, the captain of HMS Pargust gave the order to fire and the submarine was blown up and sank.

In the case of a gallant and daring act in which all men are deemed equally brave and deserving of the Victoria Cross a secret ballot is drawn. The crew of HMS Pargust selected William Williams to be the recipient of the award due to a rating in the action.

== Honours and awards ==
- 23 March 1917 – Distinguished Service Medal –
  To receive the Distinguished Service Medal – Sea. William Williams, R.N.R., O.N. 6224A.
- 20 July 1917 – Victoria Cross –
  The King has been graciously pleased to approve of the award of the following honours, decorations and medals to Officers and men for services in action with enemy submarines: – To receive the Victoria Cross. Liet. Ronald Neil Stuart, D.S.O., R.N.R.. Sea. William Williams, R.N.R., O.N. 6224A. Lieutenant Stuart and Seaman Williams were selected by the officers and ship's company respectively of one of H.M. Ships to receive the Victoria Cross under Rule 13 of the Royal Warrant dated 29 January 1856.

== Photographs ==
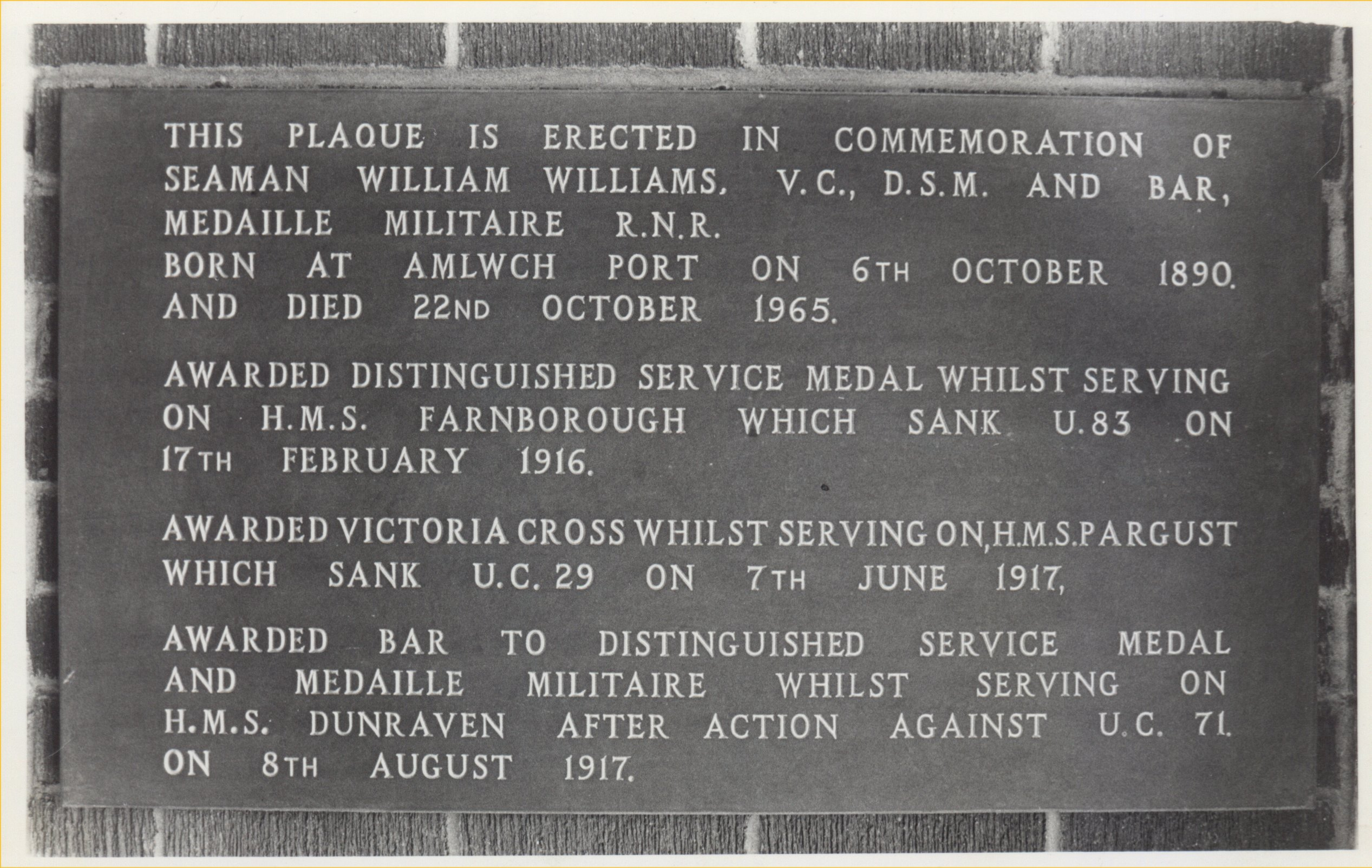
William Williams VC – Memorial Plaque

== See also ==
- Ronald Niel Stuart
