= Southwest Approaches =

Offshore waters to the southwest of Great Britain

Coordinates: 50°N 8°W

The Southwest Approaches is the name given to the offshore waters to the southwest of Great Britain and Ireland. The area includes the Celtic Sea, the Bristol Channel and sea areas off southwest Ireland. The area is bordered on the north by the St. George's Channel, on the southeast by the English Channel, and on the west by the Atlantic Ocean.
