= Cannock Chase Railways =

Historic railway lines in England

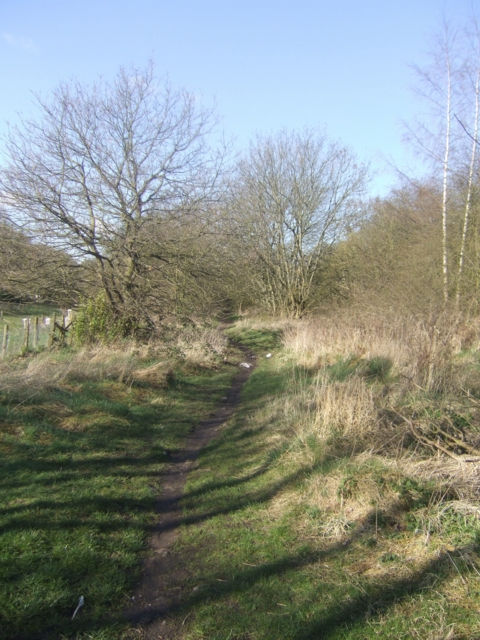
Site of one of Cannocks many lines

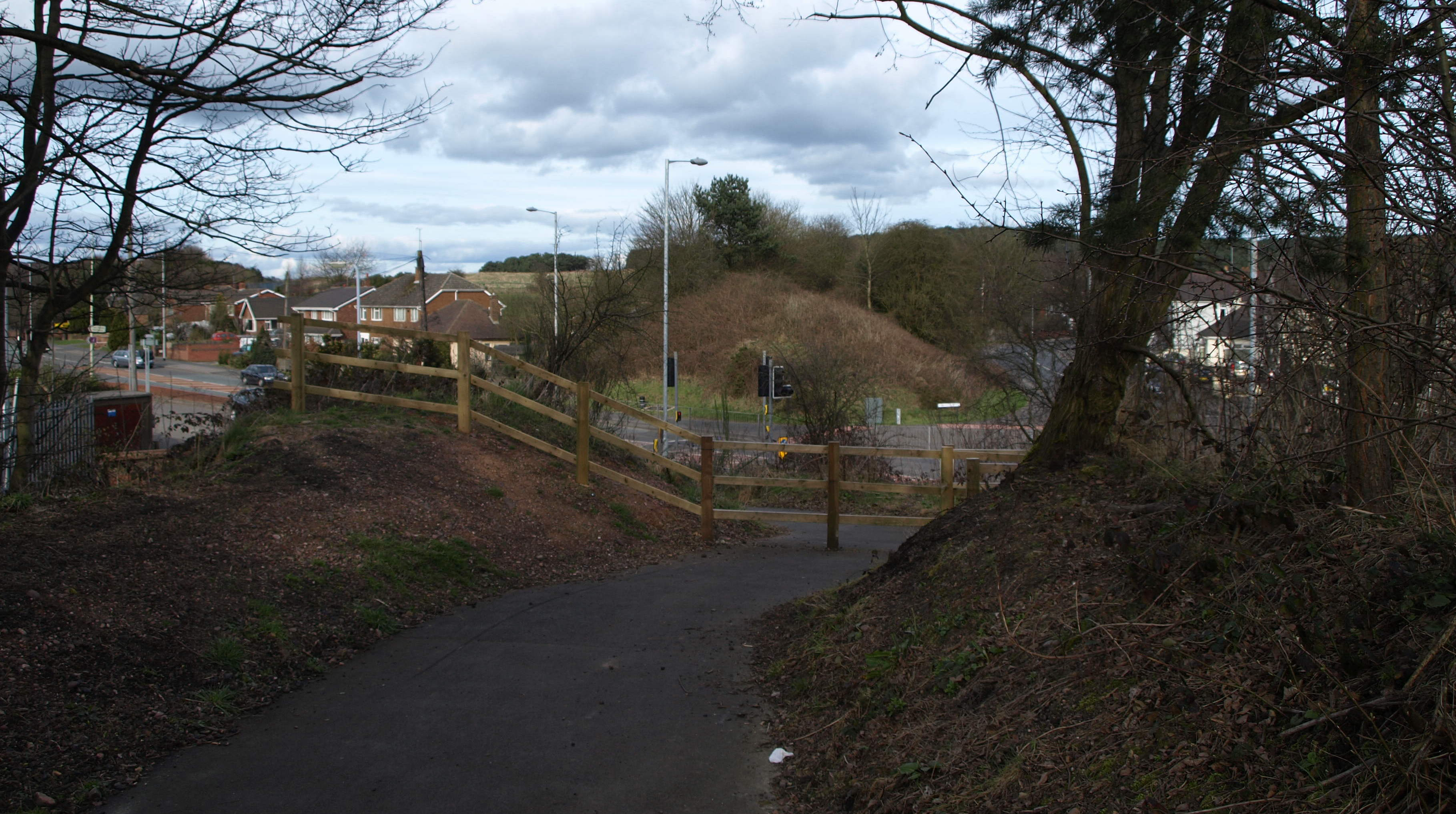
Former trackbed of a colliery line at Hednesford

The Cannock Chase Railways were mineral lines which served the collieries and many parts of Staffordshire. The branch lines and sidings branched off the local mainlines including the Grand Junction Railway, Chase Line, South Staffordshire Line and Rugby–Birmingham–Stafford line. The main junction on the railways was Norton Junction. This junction connected the lines from Walsall and Hednesford to Wolverhampton and Rugeley Trent Valley for the local collieries and the mines in the towns and villages of Bloxwich, Brownhills, Burntwood, Cannock, Cheslyn Hay, Darlaston, Essington, Great Wyrley, Hednesford, Landywood, Norton Canes, Pelsall, and Rugeley, Stafford, Walsall, Wednesfield, Willenhall, and Wolverhampton.

== History ==
Cannock Chase Railway Act 1860
- Act of Parliament
- Parliament of the United Kingdom
- Long title: An Act for making a Railway from the Cannock Mineral Railway into Cannock Chase in the County of Stafford.
- Citation: 23 & 24 Vict. c. xxxv

Dates
- Royal assent: 15 May 1860

Text of statute as originally enacted

Cannock Chase Railway (Extension) Act 1862
- Act of Parliament
- Parliament of the United Kingdom
- Long title: An Act for making a Railway to connect the South Staffordshire Railway with the Cannock Chase Railway in the County of Stafford, and for other Purposes.
- Citation: 25 & 26 Vict. c. cxciv

Dates
- Royal assent: 29 July 1862

Cannock Chase and Wolverhampton Railway Act 1864
- Act of Parliament
- Parliament of the United Kingdom
- Long title: An Act to authorize the Construction of Railways between Cannock Chase and Wolverhampton in the County of Stafford; and for other Purposes.
- Citation: 27 & 28 Vict. c. cccxii

Dates
- Royal assent: 29 July 1864

Text of statute as originally enacted

Cannock Chase and Wolverhampton Railway Act 1866
- Act of Parliament
- Parliament of the United Kingdom
- Long title: An Act to enable the Cannock Chase and Wolverhampton Railway Company to extend their Railway to Hednesford and to the South Staffordshire Railway in the County of Stafford; and for other Purposes.
- Citation: 29 & 30 Vict. c. cxcvii

Dates
- Royal assent: 16 July 1866

Text of statute as originally enacted

Cannock Chase Railway (Extension) Amendment Act 1878
- Act of Parliament
- Parliament of the United Kingdom
- Long title: An Act to provide for the cancelling of bond entered into under the Cannock Chase Railway (Extension) Act, 1862.
- Citation: 41 & 42 Vict. c. xxxiii

Dates
- Royal assent: 16 April 1878

Text of statute as originally enacted

Wolverhampton and Cannock Chase Railway Act 1901
- Act of Parliament
- Parliament of the United Kingdom
- Long title: An Act for making a railway in the county of Stafford from Wolverhampton to Great Wyrley and for other purposes.
- Citation: 1 Edw. 7. c. ccliv

Dates
- Royal assent: 17 August 1901

Text of statute as originally enacted

Wolverhampton and Cannock Chase Railway (Extension of Time) Act 1903
- Act of Parliament
- Parliament of the United Kingdom
- Long title: An Act to extend the time for the compulsory purchase of lands and for the construction and completion of the Wolverhampton and Cannock Chase Railway and for other purposes.
- Citation: 3 Edw. 7. c. cii

Dates
- Royal assent: 21 July 1903

Text of statute as originally enacted

Originally, the construction contract was let to Taylor R. Stephenson who was a railway contractor. His civil engineer for the project was George Heald. In 1858 Heald died of tuberculosis at Rugeley; the person who reported the death was T. R. Stephenson. Losing the engineer for the project and with the line incomplete, Thomas Brassey was engaged to complete it.

The sidings and branch lines to the quarries ran around the Cannock Chase and Staffordshire area. There was a direct link built via Huntington to Penkridge which gave the lines a direct link to the mainlines at Stafford and Stoke-on-Trent. The only lines which carried a form of passenger service was the Aldridge to Brownhills Branch and Chase Line. There was direct connections to Walsall and Dudley with a mineral branch from Ryders Hayes Crossing near Pelsall. Which also had a steelworks located west of the line.

Aside from Norton Junction, there was also important sidings on the South Staffordshire Line at the Angelsea Sidings. These closed in 1960s to Norton Canes. The Cannock Military Railway and Cannock Mineral Railway also operated around the many lines of Cannock Chase.

== Present ==
The lines were closed between the 1950s and early 1970s. The section from Brownhills West to Burntwood has found new use as Chasewater Railway. The branch from Pelsall to Norton Canes is now a public footpath. It has been partially blocked by the M6 Toll. The section from Cannock to Penkridge is still traceable as a walkway but has been built on at Cannock end. Three bridges remain at Penkridge End.

Norton Junction is now a large public park with all the old trackbeds with the exception of the section to Pelsall. Built on by housing estates and industrial. The section from Cannock to Brownhills is now lost under development and road alignments, but sections can still be found around Cannock as footpaths. The section from Chasewater to Aldridge has been lost under the M6 Toll and built on at Walsall Wood and Aldridge.

== Archives ==
Historical records of Cannock Chase and Wolverhampton Railway Company Limited (covering the period 1852-1946) are held at the Cadbury Research Library, University of Birmingham.
