= Cheslyn =

Cheslyn is a surname and given name. Notable people with the name include:

- Richard Cheslyn (1797–1858), English amateur cricketer
- Cheslyn Jampies (born 1990), South African soccer player

== See also ==
- Cheslyn Hay, civil parish in Staffordshire, England
- Listed buildings in Cheslyn Hay
- Wyrley and Cheslyn Hay railway station (1858–1965)
- Cheslyn Hay Academy, mixed secondary school in Cheslyn Hay
