= Essington =

Coordinates: 52.62843°N 2.05727°W

- Village and civil parish
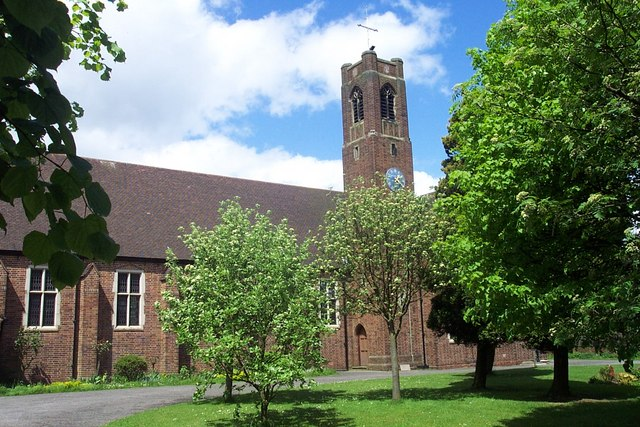
- St John's Church

- Location within Staffordshire
- Population: 5,200 (2021)
- OS grid reference: SJ962034
- Civil parish: Essington
- District: South Staffordshire
- Shire county: Staffordshire
- Region: West Midlands
- Country: England
- Sovereign state: United Kingdom
- Post town: Wolverhampton
- Postcode district: WV11
- Dialling code: 01922
- Police: Staffordshire
- Fire: Staffordshire
- Ambulance: West Midlands
- UK Parliament: Stone, Great Wyrley and Penkridge

Essington is a village and civil parish in the South Staffordshire district of Staffordshire, England, 4 miles (6.4 km) northeast of the city of Wolverhampton. Nearby are the towns of Bloxwich and Cannock and the villages of Cheslyn Hay, Great Wyrley (Landywood) and Featherstone. The parish borders the county of West Midlands and in 2021 had a population of 5,200.

== History ==
In 1870–1872 the Imperial Gazetteer of England and Wales described Essington as a township in the parish of Bushbury, with a post office and 187 houses. The population had risen from 644 in 1851 to 976 in 1861, "from the extension of mining operations", and an iron church with room for 260 people had been built in 1858–1859.

== Village ==
The remains of several moated sites from the Middle Ages have been found in the parish. Brownshore Pools, a public park, is the site of three former coal mining tailing and settling ponds surrounded by woodland. Waterfowl and other wildlife inhabit the site. On the Bursnips Road is a former railway signal box, which served the now-defunct Hilton Colliery Railway. The building, which Staffordshire County Council has designated a locally listed Grade C structure, has been converted to a private house.

== Transport ==
The village has direct connections with two main major roads: the A462, which runs from Junction 11 of the M6 to Wednesbury, West Midlands, and the A460 that links Wolverhampton with Cannock and Rugeley. The M6 and M54 motorways meet just northeast of the village, and are both accessible via the A460.

Bus route no. 71 Wolverhampton - Cannock operated by Chaserider serves Essington. Nearby railway stations are Bloxwich North, Bloxwich and Landywood.

== Essington Parish ==
The Parish of Essington covers an area of 1,463.76 hectares (5.65 sq mi) and encompasses in addition to Essington, the villages of Springhill and Newtown, (Note: Both Springhill and Newtown are designated 'village' per Ordnance Survey Open Names database (SJ80)) and several farms. The residential suburban area of Westcroft along the A460 road in the west of the parish borders the Wolverhampton suburb of Underhill. The parish is part of South Staffordshire district in Staffordshire and borders the City of Wolverhampton (Ashmore Park) and the Metropolitan Borough of Walsall in the county of West Midlands. The Health Authority is South Staffordshire, the Ambulance Service is West Midlands, Social Services are South Staffordshire in Codsall. All property taxes (rates) are collected by South Staffordshire at Codsall.

Essington Parish Council is the lowest tier of local government.

== School ==
The main school in Essington is St Johns Primary Academy. Located on Hobnock Road. A Church School was originally built in 1846 for villagers. By 1968 Brownshore first school was serving ages 4-8yrs, and St Johns CE Middle school was opened to serve 9-13yrs. By 1985 The Middle school became St Johns CE Primary School (Ages 5-11) and all year groups over the age of 11 yrs moved to Cheslyn Hay High School.

Brownshore First School building now houses a cafe, a medical centre and pharmacy, a community centre and a Playgroup -

Brownshore Pre-School Play Group, located opposite St John's Primary School on Hobnock Road.

Essington is a main catchment area for Cheslyn Hay Academy students.

== Sports ==
There are rugby and football facilities in several locations around the parish located at Essington Rugby Club, High Hill, Essington.

== Places of worship ==
St John the Evangelist is an active Anglican church in the village. It was built in 1932 and has an extension at the west end, completed in 2015. Outside the village, Essington Wood Methodist Chapel is on Bursnips Road (A462).

== Notable people ==
- Ealhswith, queen consort and wife of Alfred the Great, the self-styled first King of England.
- Ralph Sweet-Escott (1869 in Essington – 1907) played international rugby union for Wales, he also played cricket for Glamorgan.
- Meera Syal CBE (born 1961) comedian and author; her debut novel Anita and Me was set in the fictional village of Tollington, which was based on Essington in the early 1970s, where she grew up.

== See also ==
- Listed buildings in Essington
