= Landywood =

Area of Great Wyrley in Staffordshire, England

Coordinates: 52.653°N 2.017°W

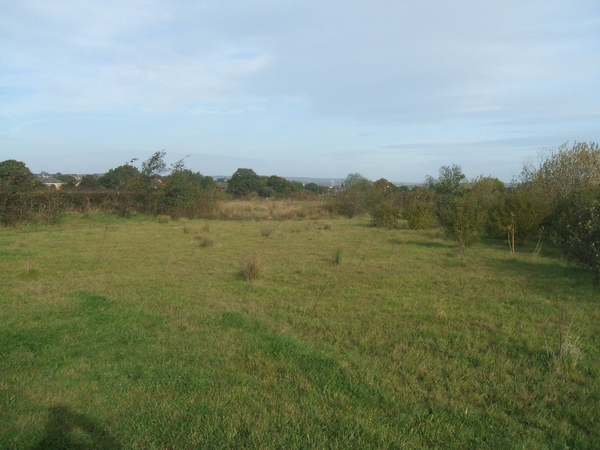
- Gilpins Basin, Landywood

- Location within Staffordshire
- District: South Staffordshire
- Shire county: Staffordshire
- Region: West Midlands
- Country: England
- Sovereign state: United Kingdom
- Post town: Walsall
- Postcode district: WS6
- Police: Staffordshire
- Fire: Staffordshire
- Ambulance: West Midlands
- UK Parliament: Stone, Great Wyrley and Penkridge

Landywood is an area of Great Wyrley in the South Staffordshire district of Staffordshire, England. Landywood is part of the South Staffordshire ward named "Great Wyrley Landywood", It lies 3 miles (4.8 km) north of Bloxwich, 3 miles (4.8 km) south from Cannock and 6 miles (9.7 km) north of Walsall.

The name Landywood means 'the woodland pasture'.

It forms part of Great Wyrley and is contiguous with Cheslyn Hay, Upper Landywood, Newtown and Little Wyrley. It is close to the border with the Metropolitan Borough of Walsall.

It is separated from Cannock to the north by the M6 Toll motorway, and the A5 road. It is served by Landywood railway station on the Chase Line, which runs from Birmingham via Walsall to Rugeley Trent Valley. National Express West Midlands bus service X51 (formerly 951) provides a connection through Lower Landywood (Gorsey Lane, Holly Lane) to Cannock via the Designer Outlet West Midlands as well as Walsall, Bloxwich, Great Barr and Birmingham. Chaserider bus service 71 links Upper Landywood (Streets Lane) with Cheslyn Hay, Cannock, Essington, Wednesfield, New Cross Hospital and Wolverhampton. Service 2 / 74 (formerly West Midlands Travel 351) was withdrawn in 2021 due to cut backs.

Landywood was the site of a Polish Merchant Navy College established in 1945 in disused Nissen huts.

In 2022, plans were approved for a new housing development on the Landywood Lane green belt, despite objections and petitions against it from local residents. This estate will border Cheslyn Hay.
