= Bloxwich North railway station =

Railway station in the West Midlands, England

Coordinates: 52.626°N 2.019°W

Bloxwich North
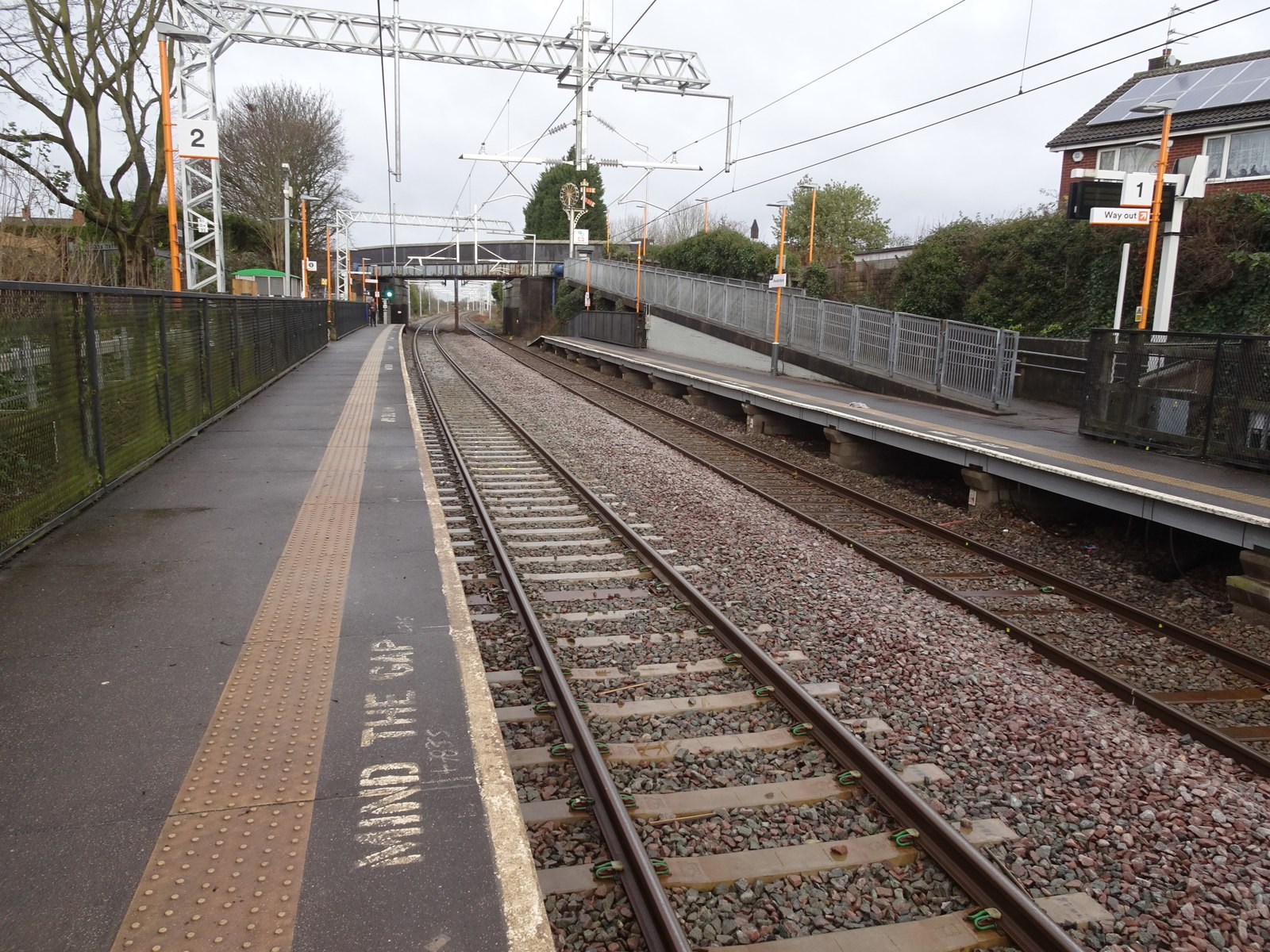
- Bloxwich North in 2019

General information
- Location: Bloxwich, Walsall; England
- Grid reference: SJ989029
- Manager: West Midlands Railway
- Transit authority: Transport for West Midlands
- Platforms: 2

Other information
- Station code: BWN
- Fare zone: 5
- Classification: DfT category F2

History
- Original company: London Midland Region of British Railways

Key dates
- 2 October 1990: Opened

Passengers
- 2021/22: ▲59,526
- 2022/23: ▲77,770
- 2023/24: ▲107,842
- 2024/25: ▲123,090
- 2025/26: ▲137,926
Location
Notes
- Passenger statistics from the Office of Rail and Road

Bloxwich North railway station serves the town of Bloxwich in the Metropolitan Borough of Walsall, West Midlands, England. The station, and all trains serving it, are operated by West Midlands Railway.

== History ==
The Chase Line from Walsall to Hednesford was reopened by British Rail to passenger trains in 1989. Bloxwich North station opened the following year, on 2 October 1990, to serve an area of new housing on the northern edge of the town. Initially, the station was just opened experimentally, although it has remained in place since then. Before opening, the station was known as Broad Lane, and it was possible to buy tickets to or from there to supplement a West Midlands pass.

== Services ==
The station is currently served by West Midlands Trains with local Transport for West Midlands branded "Chase Line" services, operated using Class 730 Electric multiple units (EMUs).

Usual off-peak services at Bloxwich North follow a pattern such as the one below:

Services are listed in trains per hour (tph)

Mondays to Saturdays:

- 2 tph northbound to Rugeley Trent Valley via Hednesford, departing from Platform 2.
- 2 tph southbound to Birmingham International via Walsall and Birmingham New Street, departing from Platform 1.

Sundays:

- 1 tph northbound to Rugeley Trent Valley.
- 1 tph southbound to Birmingham International.

Journey times are typically 9 minutes to Walsall and 31 minutes to Birmingham New Street.

=== Nearby connections ===
Bus services 31 and X51 stop nearby and offer links to Bloxwich and Walsall Town Centres, Leamore, Great Wyrley, Landywood Station and Cannock Station and Town Centre.

Preceding station	National Rail	Following station
Landywood	West Midlands Railway; Rugeley – Walsall – Birmingham International - Birmingham New Street - Wolverhampton; Chase Line	Bloxwich
