= Hednesford railway station =

Railway station in Staffordshire, England

Hednesford
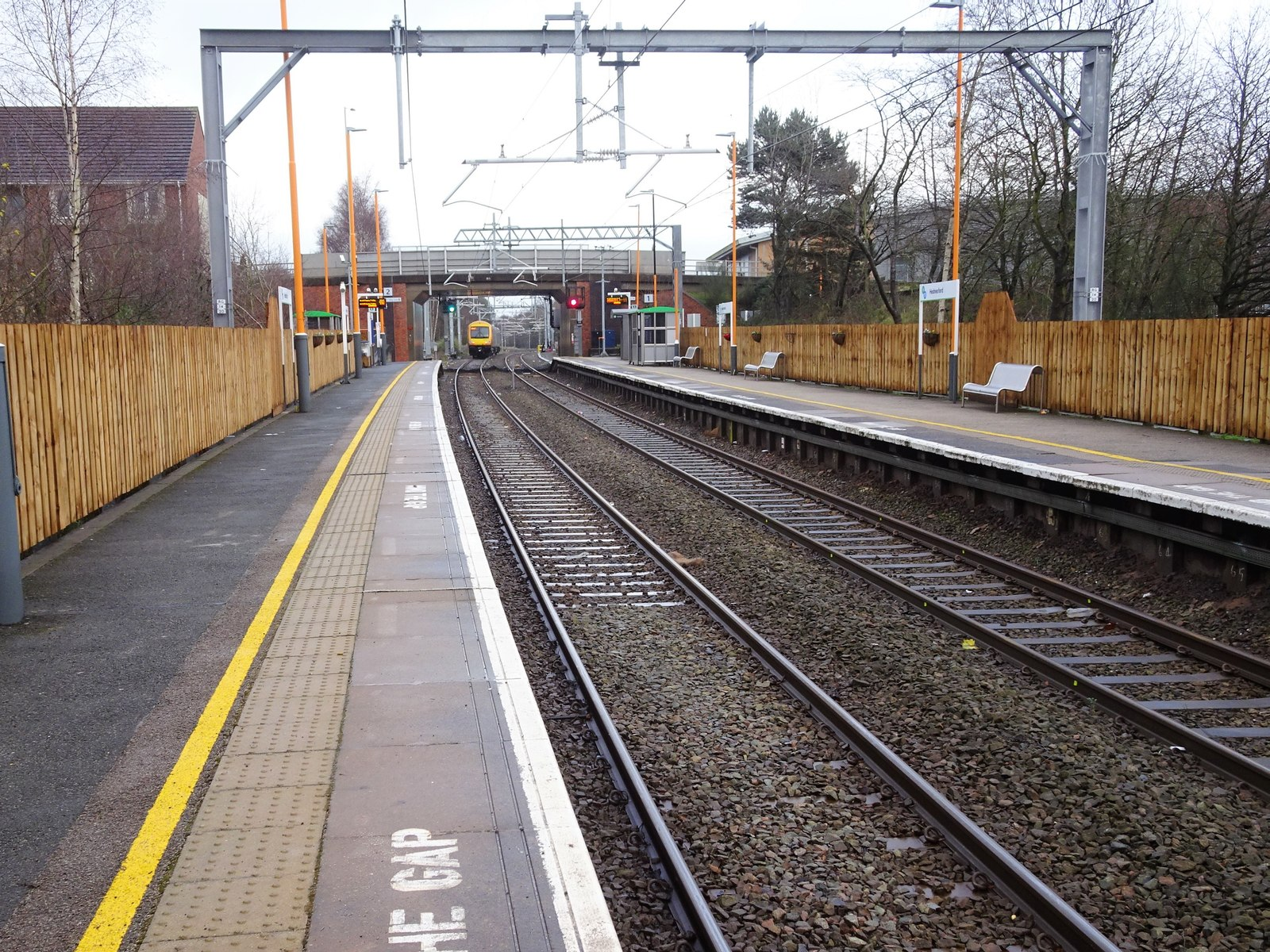

General information
- Location: Hednesford, Cannock Chase; England
- Coordinates: 52.710°N 2.002°W
- Grid reference: SJ999124
- Manager: West Midlands Railway
- Line: Chase Line
- Platforms: 2
- Tracks: 2

Construction
- Parking: Free (58 spaces)
- Accessible: Both platforms

Other information
- Status: Unstaffed
- Station code: HNF
- Fare zone: West Midlands Zone 5
- Classification: DfT category F1
- Website: https://www.westmidlandsrailway.co.uk/stations/hednesford

History
- Opened: 1859, 10 April 1989 (reopened to passengers)
- Closed: 18 January 1965 (to passengers), 6 September 1965 (to goods traffic)
- Electrified: December 2018
- Original company: Cannock Mineral Railway

Passengers
- 2021/22: ▲0.153 million
- 2022/23: ▲0.192 million
- 2023/24: ▲0.254 million
- 2024/25: ▲0.276 million
- 2025/26: ▲0.315 million
Location
Notes
- Passenger statistics from the Office of Rail and Road

Hednesford railway station serves the market town of Hednesford in Staffordshire, England. The station forms a part of the Chase Line and is operated by West Midlands Railway.

== History ==
The station was opened in 1859 on the Cannock Mineral Railway's line from Cannock to Rugeley Town and taken over by the London and North Western Railway a decade later (though the LNWR had worked the line from the outset). It closed to passengers on 18 January 1965 and to goods traffic on 6 September the same year as a result of the Beeching Axe, though the line that passed through remained in use for goods & mineral traffic, serving the power station at Rugeley and various local collieries.

The station reopened in 1989 by British Rail, as the terminus of the first stage of the reopening of the Chase Line from Walsall to passenger trains. At first, there was just a single platform (the current Walsall-bound one); however when services were extended to Rugeley Town in 1997, a second platform was added.

== Facilities ==
There is no ticket office, so the Penalty fare scheme operates at the station, and passengers must buy a ticket from the machines at the station to avoid paying the £100 surcharge. Hednesford's ticket machine is card-only, so passengers who only have cash must instead present themselves to the onboard conductor at the earliest opportunity.

The station features a 58-space free car park located on Anglesey Street.

Hednesford is the only station not located in the West Midlands to be part of the West Midlands Trains concessionary travel zone, situated in Zone 5 of the West Midlands railway network. It has been in place since the introduction of the scheme but is the only station to operate this scheme, as similar stations Cannock, Landywood, and Rugeley Town do not operate in the same zone.

== Services ==
Services towards Birmingham International can usually be accessed from platform 1 and services towards Rugeley Trent Valley can usually be accessed from platform 2.

Most services are operated by Class 730 electric trains and journey times are typically 19 minutes to Walsall and 42 minutes to Birmingham New Street.

Some services to/from London Euston used to serve the station. Some services towards Birmingham New Street or Walsall start or terminate here.

=== Frequency ===
From Monday-Saturday throughout the daytime, the station typically sees 2 trains-per-hour in both directions. On Sundays this is reduced to just 1 train-per-hour in both directions.

Service Frequency According to the 2 June - 14 December 2024 Timetable
| | Platform 1 | | | | Platform 2 | | | |
| Days | Start | End | tph | Destination | Start | End | tph | Destination |
|---|---|---|---|---|---|---|---|---|
| Monday-Friday | 06:12 | 23:10 | 2 | Birmingham International | 06:08 | 00:09 | 2 | Rugeley Trent Valley |
| Monday-Saturday | 06:12 | 23:03 | 2 | Birmingham International | 06:05 | 23:12 | 2 | Rugeley Trent Valley |
| Sunday | 10:00 | 23:00 | 1 | Birmingham International | 09:26 | 23:25 | 1 | Rugeley Trent Valley |

=== Connections ===
Connections to Stafford, Crewe, London and stations on the Trent Valley Line are available at Rugeley Trent Valley along with connections to stations along the West Coast Main Line from Birmingham New Street.

=== History ===
Some services to/from London Euston used to serve the station. Some services towards Birmingham New Street or Walsall start or terminate here.

== Bus Connections ==
Hednesford no longer has a bus station, although there is an interchange on Victoria Street acting as a hub to locations such as Cannock, Rugeley, Lichfield and Pye Green. All services are run by Chaserider and Select Bus. No buses operate on Sunday.

| Preceding station | National Rail | Following station |
|---|---|---|
| Rugeley Town | West Midlands Railway; Rugeley - Walsall - Birmingham | Cannock |
