= Wyrley and Cheslyn Hay railway station =

Former railway station in England

Wyrley and Cheslyn Hay

General information
- Location: Great Wyrley, South Staffordshire; England
- Coordinates: 52.6663°N 2.0244°W
- Grid reference: SJ984076
- Platforms: 2

Other information
- Status: Disused

History
- Original company: South Staffordshire Railway
- Pre-grouping: London and North Western Railway
- Post-grouping: London, Midland and Scottish Railway

Key dates
- 1 February 1858: Opened as Wyrley and Church Bridge
- 1 December 1912: Renamed Wyrley and Cheslyn Hay
- 18 January 1965: Closed
Location

Wyrley and Cheslyn Hay railway station served the villages of Great Wyrley and Cheslyn Hay in Staffordshire, England, between 1858 and 1965.

== History ==
The station was opened by the South Staffordshire Railway (SSR) on 1 February 1858 and was originally named Wyrley and Church Bridge; it was situated on SSR line between Walsall and Rugeley Town. The SSR was absorbed by the London and North Western Railway (LNWR) in 1867. The station was renamed Wyrley and Cheslyn Hay on 1 December 1912, and closed on 18 January 1965. The station was immortalised in 1964 in the song "Slow Train" by Flanders and Swann.

Besides Great Wyrley and Cheslyn Hay, the station served the Bridgtown area. Bridgtown is situated on the A5 next to Churchbridge. Churchbridge is so named because the bridge over the stream which defines Great Wyrley parish boundary (Wyrley Brook) on the Watling Street (now the A5) at that point, used to be maintained by the Lichfield diocese. A path existed alongside the embankment between Bridgtown and the station for passengers. The path is overgrown and impassable at its northern end but its existence caused the building of the footbridge over the M6toll alongside the railway bridge at Churchbridge. The remains of both platforms can still be seen. There used to be a goods line to the Gilpin's Foundry which left the main line just north of the station with a crossing next to Station Road railway bridge. The foundry used to be situated at the junction of the A5 and A34 at Churchbridge. There is now a housing estate on that site.

The station was replaced by Landywood railway station.

Preceding station	Historical railways	Following station
Cannock; Line and station open	London and North Western Railway; South Staffordshire Railway	Bloxwich; Line and station open
