= Landywood railway station =

Railway station in Staffordshire, England

Coordinates: 52.657°N 2.021°W

Landywood
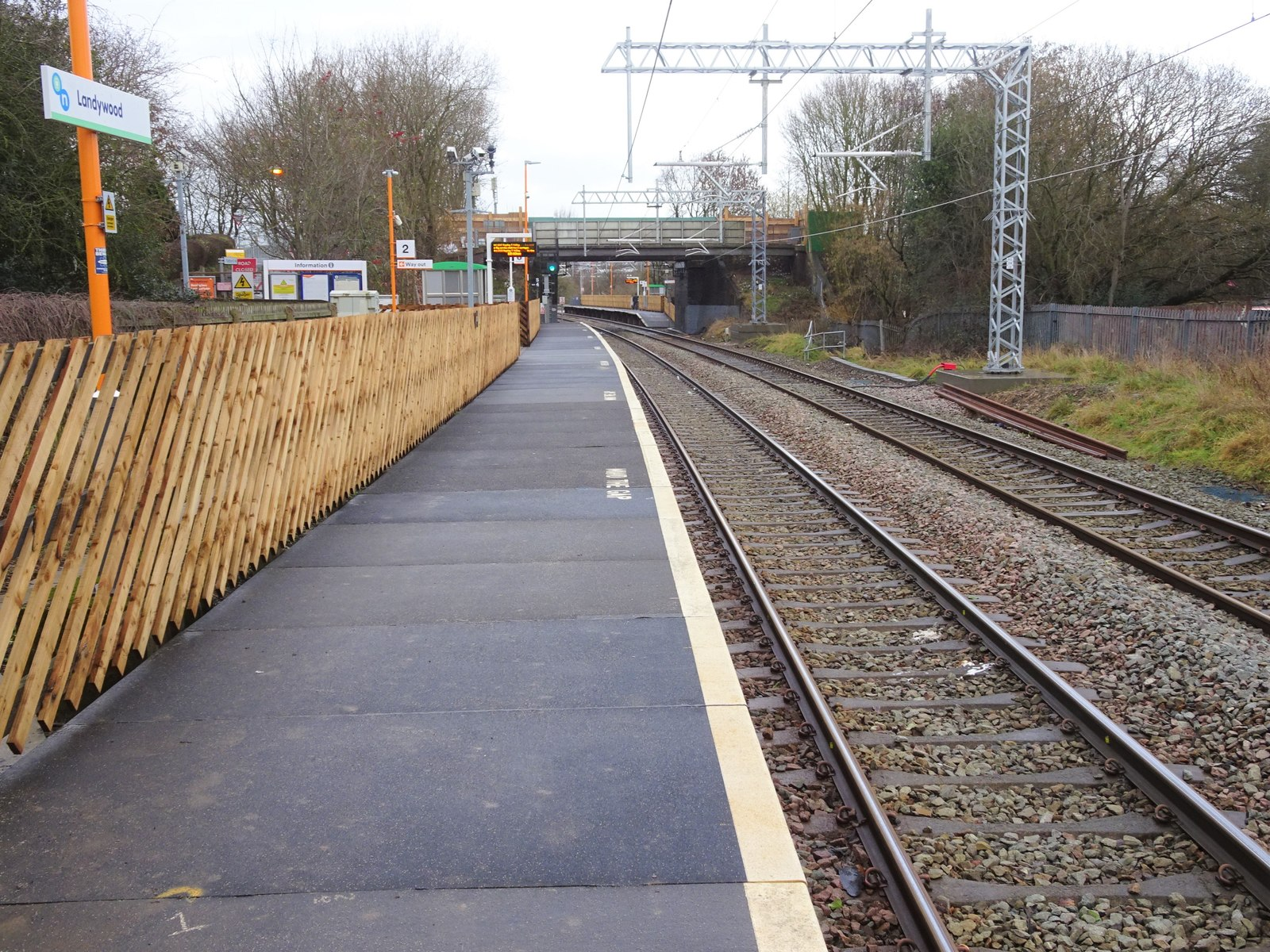
- Landywood railway station in 2019

General information
- Location: Landywood, South Staffordshire; England
- Grid reference: SJ986065
- Manager: West Midlands Railway
- Platforms: 2

Other information
- Station code: LAW
- Classification: DfT category F2

Key dates
- 1908: Opened as Landywood Halt
- 1916: Closed
- 1989: Reopened as Landywood

Passengers
- 2021/22: ▲101,382
- 2022/23: ▲117,630
- 2023/24: ▲159,556
- 2024/25: ▲168,684
- 2025/26: ▲191,142
Location
Notes
- Passenger statistics from the Office of Rail and Road

Landywood railway station is situated in the village of Landywood in Staffordshire, England. As well as Landywood, the station also serves the adjacent villages of Cheslyn Hay and Great Wyrley (The former Wyrley and Cheslyn Hay railway station closed in the 1960s). The LNWR also operated an earlier halt at Landywood which closed on 1 January 1916.

The station, and all trains serving it, are operated by West Midlands Railway.

== History ==
The first station on the site was opened in 1908 by the London and North Western Railway but closed after a short life in 1916. The present station opened in 1989, as part of the first stage of the reopening by British Rail of the Chase Line from Walsall to Hednesford to passenger trains. The area was previously served by a station further north at Great Wyrley, but this was closed during the Beeching Axe of the 1960s.

In 2010, the stations between Walsall and Stafford (including Landywood) were subject to a £1.6 million upgrade project. This included the installation of new lighting, CCTV, live train information boards (since upgraded), and new waiting shelters.

From 2018, Great Wyrley & Cheslyn Hay Community Group will help maintain the station as part of West Midland Railway's station adoption scheme.

In 2019 the Chase Line electrification works were completed and the first electric trains started running from 19 May. This was to coincide with a major timetable change introducing hourly services to London Euston via Birmingham International. London bound trains were run under the London Northwestern brand. London trains were later axed due to reliability issues.

In June 2024, a complete resurfacing of the car park was carried out and improved disabled access.

== Services ==
Typically, Monday to Saturday daytimes and peak times, The station is currently served by West Midlands Trains with local Transport for West Midlands branded "Chase Line" services, operated using Class 730 Electric multiple units (EMUs).

Usual off-peak services at Landywood follow a pattern such as the one below:

Services are listed in trains per hour (tph)

Mondays to Saturdays:

- 2 tph northbound to Rugeley Trent Valley via Hednesford, departing from Platform 2.
- 2 tph southbound to Birmingham International via Walsall and Birmingham New Street, departing from Platform 1.

Sundays:

- 1 tph northbound to Rugeley Trent Valley.
- 1 tph southbound to Birmingham International.

Journey times are typically 14 minutes to Walsall and 38 minutes to Birmingham New Street.

=== Nearby connections ===
A range of onward travel options are available from nearby bus stops. Bus service X51 directly links Landywood to Cannock Station, Bloxwich North Station and Moor Street Station. Service 1, 71 and X51 offer links to Cheslyn Hay, Wolverhampton, New Cross Hospital, Essington, Walsall, Great Barr, Birmingham and the McArthurGlen Designer Outlet in Hawks Green.

Nearby shopping precinct 'Quinton Court' offers a range of shops and eateries, in addition to Great Wyrley Library and Health Center.

Preceding station	National Rail	Following station
Cannock	West Midlands Railway; Rugeley - Walsall - Birmingham	Bloxwich North
