= St John's Church, Essington =

Anglican church in Essington, Staffordshire, England

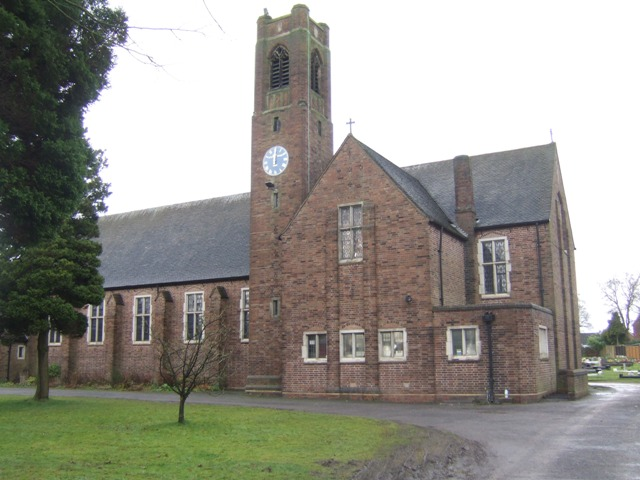
- St John's Church, Essington
- St John's Church, Essington
- 52.627628°N 2.060134°W
- OS grid reference: SJ 96026 03318
- Location: Essington, South Staffordshire, Staffordshire
- Country: England
- Denomination: Anglican
- Website: stjohnsessington.co.uk

History
- Status: Parish Church
- Dedication: Saint John the Baptist
- Dedicated: 1932
- Consecrated: 1932

Architecture
- Functional status: Active
- Completed: 1932

Specifications
- Capacity: 150

Administration
- Province: Canterbury
- Diocese: Lichfield
- Deanery: Penkridge
- Parish: Essington

St John's Church is the parish church of Essington in the South Staffordshire district of Staffordshire, England. It is an active place of worship and is located on Wolverhampton Road. The church was built in 1932 on a three-acre site in the centre of the village of Essington, replacing the previous "Iron Church" built in 1859. The church is a Grade A locally listed building, described as "a fine example of inter-war architecture [which] shows an exuberant use of brick".

== History ==
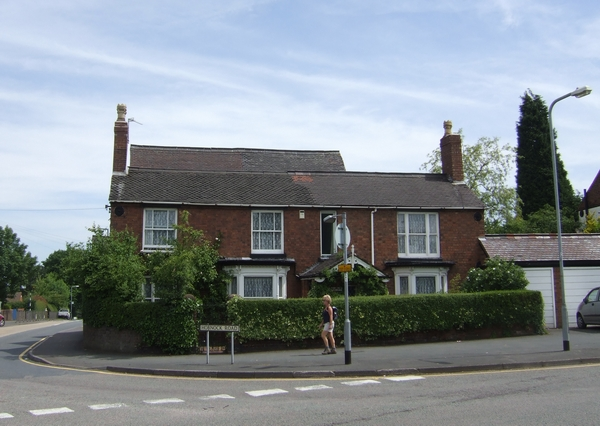
The Old Vicarage, near the site of the old church on Hobnock Road, Essington

A church was built in 1859 on Hobnock Road as a mission church of the parish church of Bushbury. It was known as the "Iron Church", and later served as the church hall until 1966. The old church was served by oil lamps and a coke stove, around which the choristers huddled after their practices.

The new church was built in 1932, and benefitted from electric lighting and central heating.

== Present day ==
The church continues to be used for both worship and community gatherings.
