= Springhill, South Staffordshire =

Coordinates: 52.636572°N 2.0367998°W

Springhill
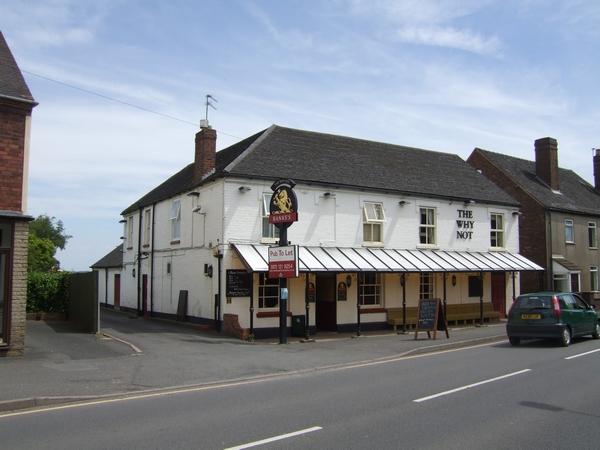

- Location within Staffordshire
- Area: 0.300 km^{2} (0.116 sq mi)
- Population: 538 (2019 estimate)
  - Density: 1,793/km^{2} (4,640/sq mi)
- Civil parish: Essington
- District: South Staffordshire
- Shire county: Staffordshire
- Region: West Midlands
- Country: England
- Sovereign state: United Kingdom
- Police: Staffordshire
- Fire: Staffordshire
- Ambulance: West Midlands

Springhill is a hamlet about a mile from Essington village, in the civil parish of Essington, in the South Staffordshire district, in the county of Staffordshire, England. In 2019 it had an estimated population of 538.

== Amenities ==
Springhill has a pub called the Why Not Inn Inn.

== History ==
The name "Springhill" means "hill with a copse". Springhill Colliery located east of Springhill appears to have been active in the 19th century.
