= Charlie Moore (footballer, born 1898) =

English footballer (1898–1966)

Personal information
- Full name: Charles William Moore
- Date of birth: 3 June 1898
- Place of birth: Cheslyn Hay, Staffordshire, England
- Date of death: 9 March 1966 (aged 72)
- Height: 5 ft 8 in (1.73 m)
- Position: Full back

Senior career*
Years	Team	Apps	(Gls)
?–1919	Hednesford Town		
1919–1921	Manchester United	62	(0)
1922–1930	Manchester United	247	(0)
Total		309	(0)
- * Club domestic league appearances and goals

Charles William Moore (3 June 1898 – 9 March 1966) was an English footballer who played as a full back for Manchester United. Born in Cheslyn Hay, Staffordshire, he played for Hednesford Town before joining United in May 1919. After two seasons, a recurring injury forced Moore to stop playing football, but in September 1922 he returned to play for United for a further eight years, making a total of 328 appearances for the club before retiring at the end of the 1929–30 season. Moore became most-capped United outfield player who never scored for the club. He also never made an appearance for England, despite his reliability and consistency in his club's lineup.

== Career statistics ==
Appearances and goals by club, season and competition
Club	Season	League		FA Cup		Total	
Club	Season	Apps	Goals	Apps	Goals	Apps	Goals
Manchester United	1919–20	36	0	2	0	38	0
Manchester United	1920–21	26	0	0	0	26	0
Manchester United	1922–23	12	0	0	0	12	0
Manchester United	1923–24	42	0	2	0	44	0
Manchester United	1924–25	40	0	1	0	41	0
Manchester United	1925–26	33	0	7	0	40	0
Manchester United	1926–27	30	0	3	0	33	0
Manchester United	1927–28	25	0	1	0	26	0
Manchester United	1928–29	37	0	2	0	39	0
Manchester United	1929–30	28	0	1	0	29	0
Manchester United	Total	309	0	19	0	328	0
