= Bloxwich railway station =

Railway station in Bloxwich, Walsall

Coordinates: 52.618°N 2.011°W

Bloxwich
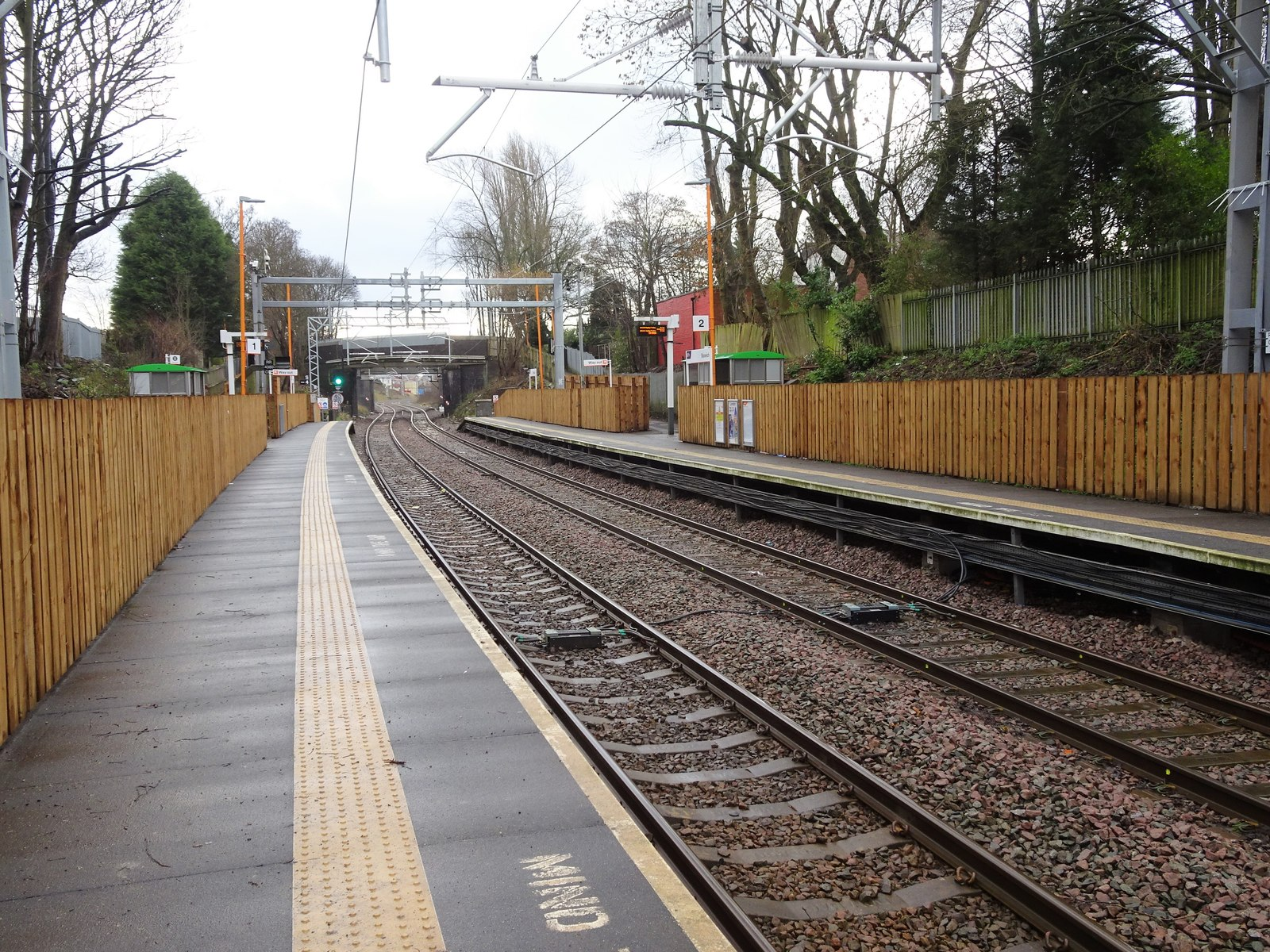

General information
- Location: Bloxwich, Walsall; England
- Grid reference: SJ993022
- Owner: Network Rail
- Manager: West Midlands Railway
- Transit authority: Transport for West Midlands
- Platforms: 2

Other information
- Station code: BLX
- Fare zone: 5
- Classification: DfT category F2

Key dates
- 1 February 1858: Opened
- 10 August 1964: Closed to Goods
- 18 January 1965: Closed to Passengers
- 17 April 1989: Reopened on new site

Passengers
- 2021/22: ▲60,324
- 2022/23: ▲75,046
- 2023/24: ▲102,284
- 2024/25: ▲114,166
- 2025/26: ▲137,266
Location
Notes
- Passenger statistics from the Office of Rail and Road

Bloxwich railway station serves Bloxwich, in the Metropolitan Borough of Walsall, West Midlands, England. The station, and all trains serving it, are operated by West Midlands Railway. It is situated between Bloxwich North and Walsall, 2 miles 32 chains (3.9 km) from Ryecroft Junction, just east of Walsall.

== History ==
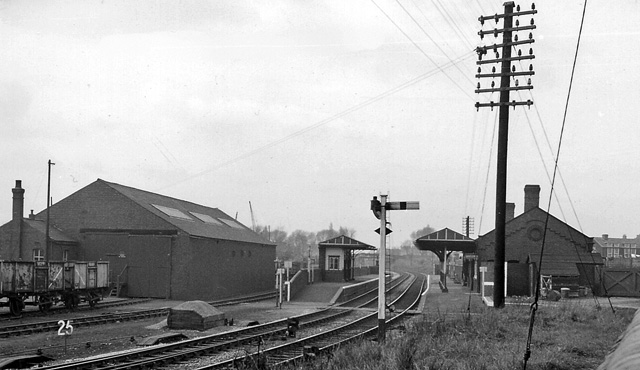
The original London & North Western Railway station closed in 1965

The present station opened on 17 April 1989, as part of the first stage of the reopening of the Chase Line from Walsall to Hednesford to passenger trains under British Rail.

An earlier Bloxwich station existed a few hundred yards to the south, just north of the site of the former level crossing and Bloxwich Signal Box. It opened on 1 February 1858 and closed to passengers on 18 January 1965.

The line was electrified by December 2018, with electric trains running from May 2019.

== Passenger volume ==
Passenger Volume at Bloxwich
	2002–03	2004–05	2005–06	2006–07	2007–08	2008–09	2009–10	2010–11	2011–12	2012–13	2013–14	2014–15	2015–16	2016–17	2017–18	2018–19	2019–20	2020–21	2021–22	2022–23
Entries and exits	17,278	16,080	16,317	21,129	24,003	38,490	42,602	42,726	39,170	41,808	43,540	40,184	43,728	49,672	44,198	49,186	55,014	14,794	60,324	75,046

The statistics cover twelve month periods that start in April.

== Services ==
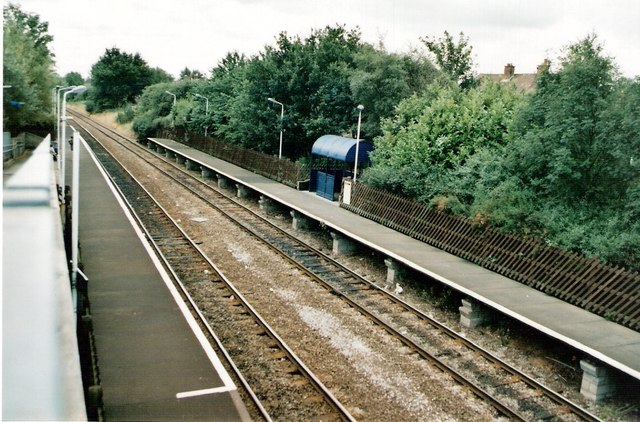
The station seen before electrification, in 2000

The station is currently served by West Midlands Trains with local Transport for West Midlands branded "Chase Line" services, operated using Class 730 Electric multiple units (EMUs).

Usual off-peak services at Bloxwich follow a pattern such as the one below:

Mondays to Saturdays:

- 2 trains per hour northbound to Rugeley Trent Valley via Hednesford, departing from Platform 2.
- 2 trains per hour southbound to Birmingham International via Walsall and Birmingham New Street, departing from Platform 1.

Sundays:

- 1 train per hour northbound to Rugeley Trent Valley.
- 1 train per hour southbound to Birmingham International.

Journey times are typically 9 minutes to Walsall and 31 minutes to Birmingham New Street, where connections to Stafford, Stoke-on-Trent and Crewe are available, although a small number of trains (2 per day on weekdays) start/terminate at Hednesford.

Preceding station	National Rail	Following station
Bloxwich North	West Midlands Railway; Rugeley - Walsall - Birmingham; Chase Line	Walsall
Bloxwich North	West Midlands Railway; Birmingham - Wolverhampton; Rugby–Birmingham–Stafford line Limited service	Walsall

== Bibliography ==
- Quick, Michael (2023). Railway Passenger Stations in Great Britain: A Chronology (PDF) (5th ed.). London: Railway and Canal Historical Society.
