= Cannock railway station =

Railway station in Staffordshire, England

Coordinates: 52.686°N 2.022°W

Cannock
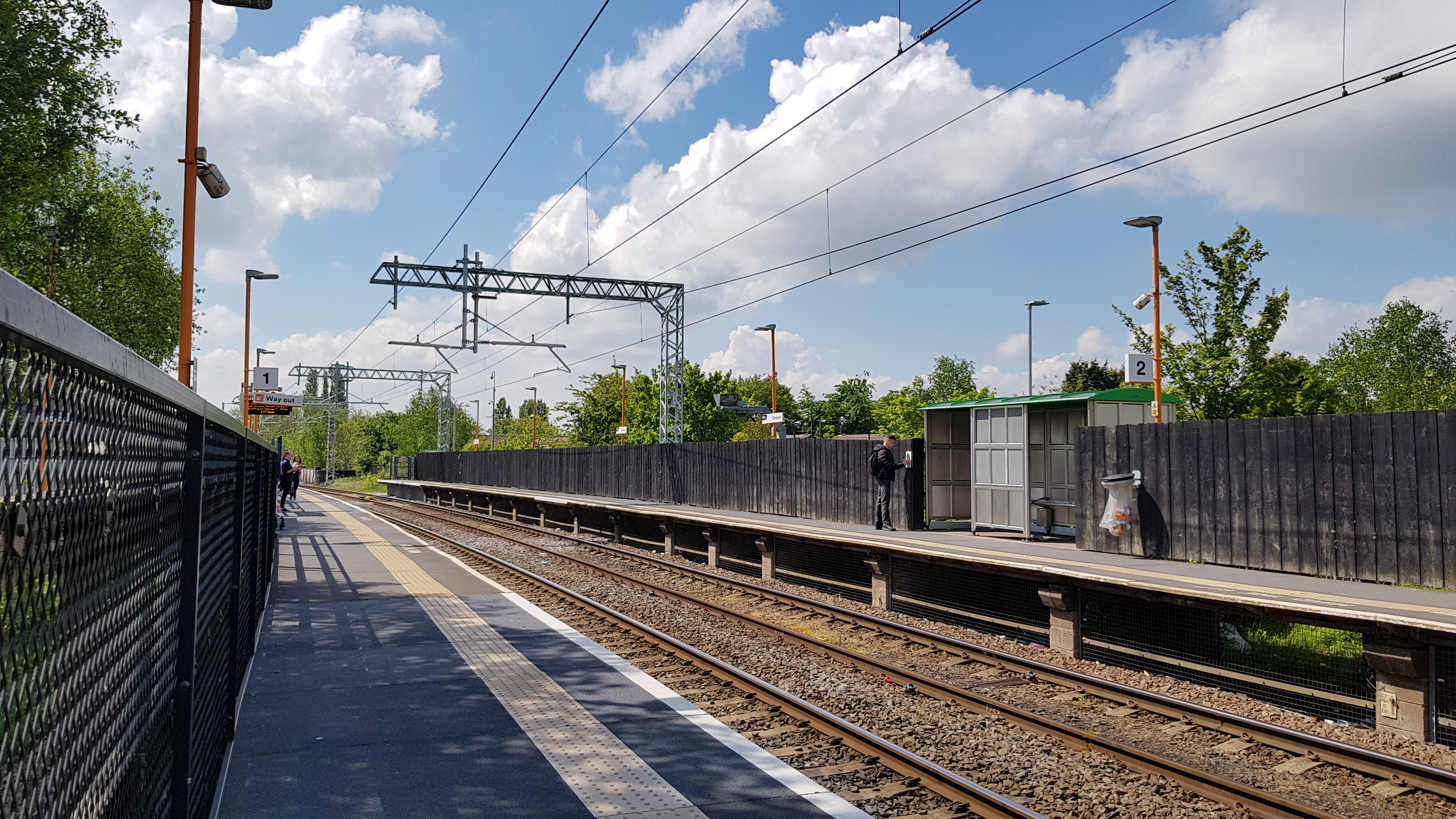

General information
- Location: Cannock, Cannock Chase; England
- Grid reference: SJ985098
- Manager: West Midlands Railway
- Line: Chase Line
- Platforms: 2

Other information
- Station code: CAO
- Classification: DfT category F1

History
- Original company: South Staffordshire Railway
- Pre-grouping: London and North Western Railway
- Post-grouping: London, Midland and Scottish Railway

Key dates
- 1 February 1858: Opened as terminus
- 7 November 1859: Line extended to Rugeley
- 18 January 1965: Closed
- 10 April 1989: Reopened

Passengers
- 2021/22: ▲0.198 million
- 2022/23: ▲0.233 million
- 2023/24: ▲0.315 million
- 2024/25: ▲0.329 million
- 2025/26: ▲0.379 million
Location
Notes
- Passenger statistics from the Office of Rail and Road

Cannock railway station serves the town of Cannock in the Cannock Chase, Staffordshire, England. It is situated on the Chase Line. The station and all trains serving it are operated by West Midlands Trains. The station is located over half a mile from the centre of the town, close to the suburbs of Stoney Lea and Hawks Green.

== History ==
In 1854, the South Staffordshire Railway (SSR) obtained powers to build a branch to Cannock from Ryecroft Junction on its main line near Walsall; this was opened to passengers and goods on 1 February 1858 together with Cannock station. In 1855, the Cannock Mineral Railway (CMR) was authorised to connect this branch with the London and North Western Railway (LNWR) at Rugeley, this line was leased to the LNWR on 7 November 1859 and opened for passengers and goods at the same time. The SSR was leased to the LNWR in February 1861 and absorbed on 15 June 1867; the CMR being absorbed by the LNWR in 1869. The station was closed to passengers by British Railways on 18 January 1965 and to goods on 10 August 1964, as part of the Beeching Axe. The remains of a small part of the original Up (southbound) platform can still be seen just to the north of the station and behind platform 1.

The station reopened by British Rail in 1989, as part of the first stage of the reopening to passenger trains of the Chase Line from Walsall to Hednesford.

Announcements were made in December 2018 for minor renovations of the station. "The plans include extending the platform, improving access, creating a 300-space car park, adding spaces for bikes and improving information points. The total cost is expected to be £400,000, with £129,000 being contributed from the joint Investment Fund agreed by Staffordshire County Council and £40,000 from the West Midlands Rail Executive and West Midlands Trains."

Completion of electrification of the Chase line in May 2019 enabled an increased service frequency and speed of services from Cannock including a direct electric train service to London for the first time.

== Services ==
The station is currently served by West Midlands Trains with local Transport for West Midlands branded "Chase Line" services, operated using Class 730 Electric multiple units (EMUs).

Usual off-peak services at Cannock follow a pattern such as the one below:

Services are listed in trains per hour (tph)

Mondays to Saturdays:

- 2 tph northbound to Rugeley Trent Valley via Hednesford, departing from Platform 2.
- 2 tph southbound to Birmingham International via Walsall and Birmingham New Street, departing from Platform 1.

Sundays:

- 1 tph northbound to Rugeley Trent Valley.
- 1 tph southbound to Birmingham International.

Preceding station	National Rail	Following station
Hednesford	West Midlands Railway; Rugeley - Walsall - Birmingham; Chase Line	Landywood
Hednesford	West Midlands Railway; Rugeley - Walsall - Birmingham - Wolverhampton; Limited service	Landywood
	Historical railways	
Hednesford; Line and station open	London and North Western Railway; Cannock Mineral Railway; South Staffordshire Railway	Wyrley and Cheslyn Hay; Line open, station closed

== Gallery ==
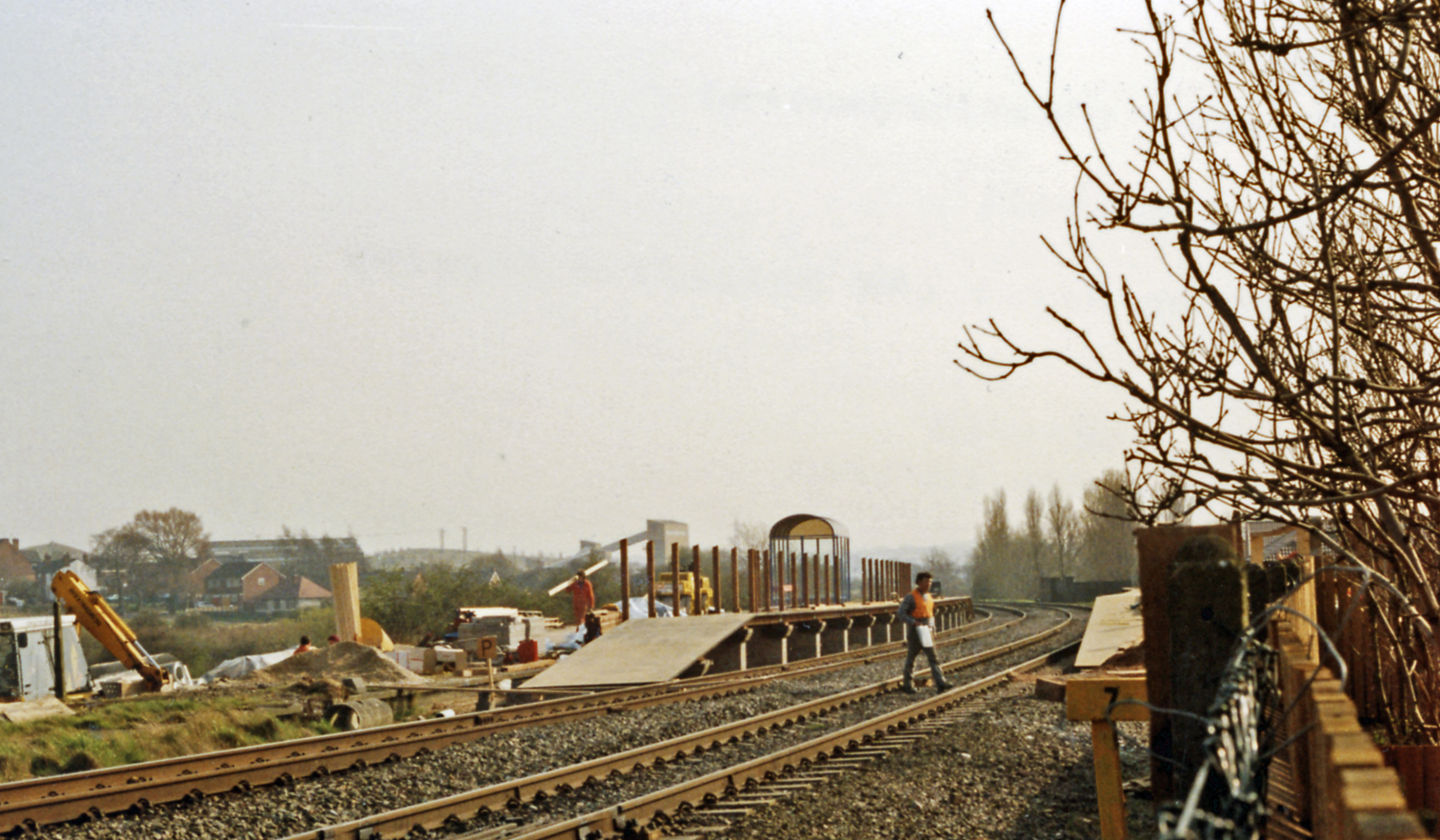
Under construction in 1989

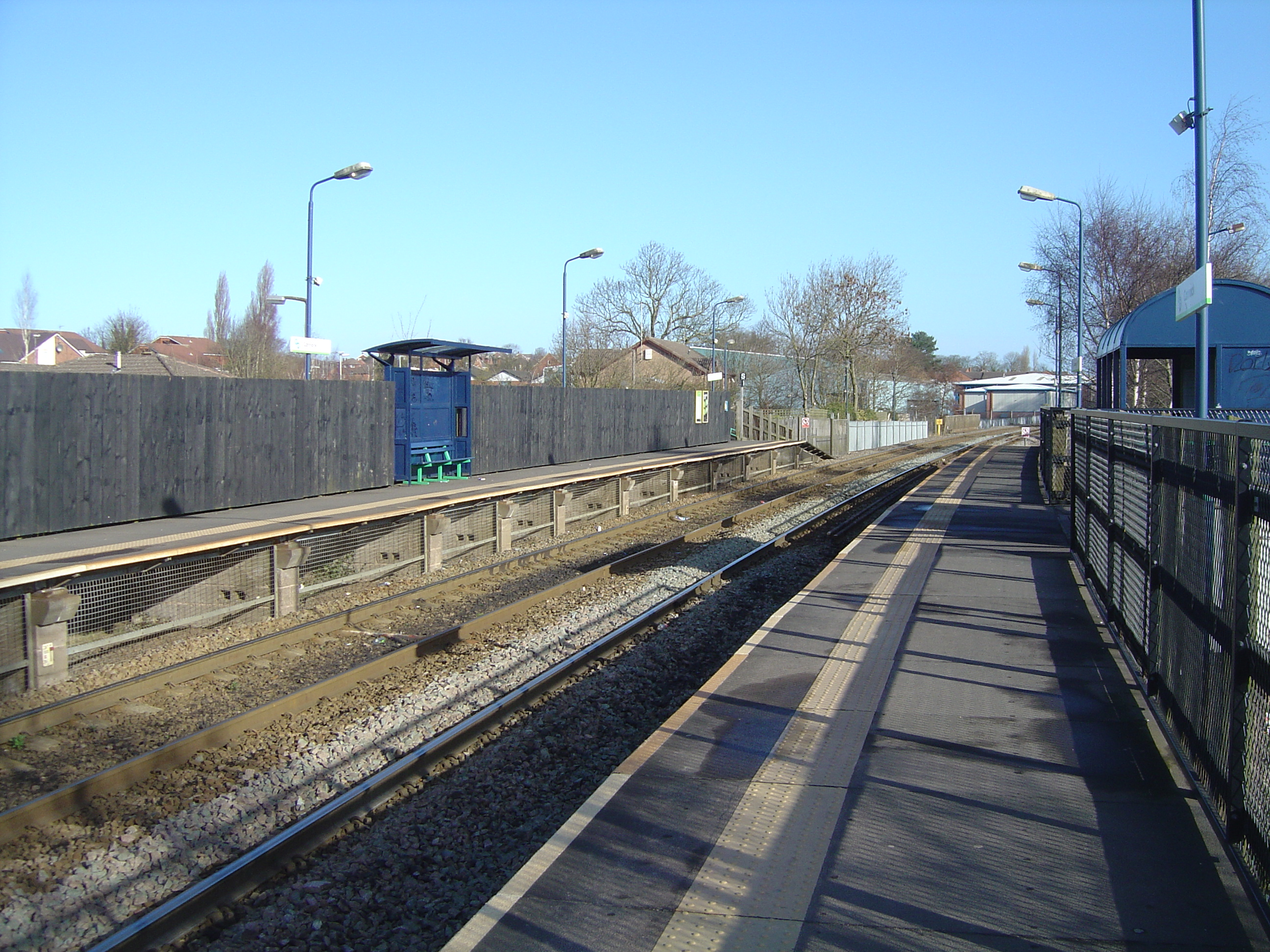
The station in March 2009

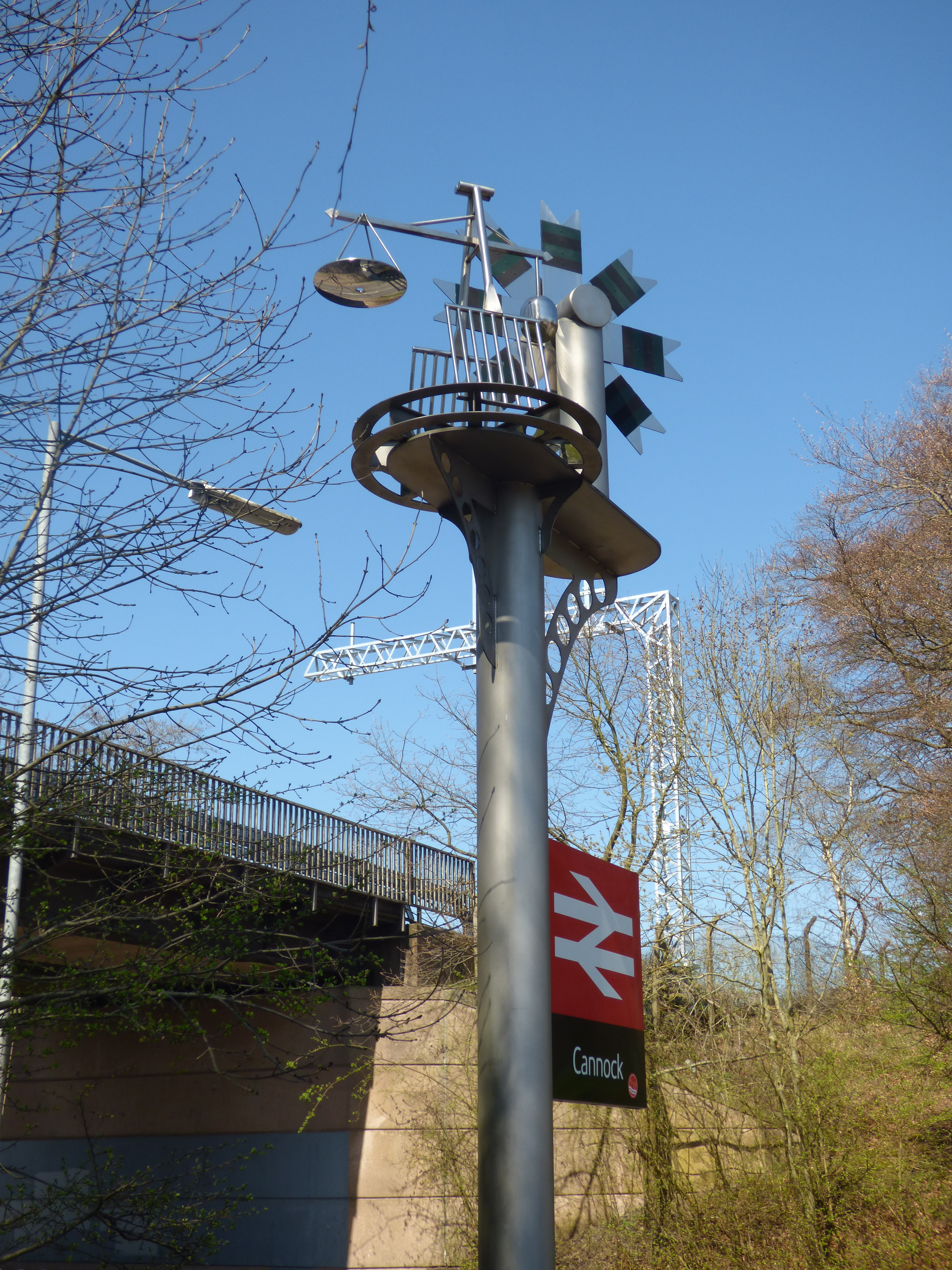
Cannock Station – sign and sculpture
