= Stone, Great Wyrley and Penkridge =

UK Parliament constituency (since 2024)

- County constituency for the House of Commons
- Boundary of Stone, Great Wyrley and Penkridge in West Midlands region
- County: Staffordshire
- Major settlements: Stone, Great Wyrley, Penkridge, Landywood

Current constituency
- Created: 2024
- Member of Parliament: Gavin Williamson (Conservative)
- Seats: One
- Created from: Stone, South Staffordshire

Stone, Great Wyrley and Penkridge is a constituency of the House of Commons in the UK Parliament. Further to the completion of the 2023 review of Westminster constituencies, it was first contested at the 2024 general election and is represented by Gavin Williamson of the Conservative Party.

== Constituency profile ==
High Street, Stone

Stone, Great Wyrley and Penkridge is a constituency in Staffordshire in the West Midlands region of England. Its largest town is Stone, which has a population of around 18,000. Villages in the constituency include Great Wyrley, Penkridge, Cheslyn Hay, Featherstone and Essington.

This is a largely rural constituency with many small villages. It stretches from Stone, which is close to Stoke-on-Trent, south to the villages on the outskirts of Wolverhampton. Stone is a historic market town which grew from its brewing industry and from its position on the Trent and Mersey Canal. The town and its surroundings are mostly affluent whilst the southern villages have average levels of wealth. House prices across the constituency are generally higher than the rest of the West Midlands but lower than the UK average.

Stone, Great Wyrley and Penkridge has a large retired population and below-average proportions of young and middle-aged adults. Residents have above-average levels of income and homeownership and the child poverty rate is low. They have average levels of education and are likely to be religious. A high proportion of residents work in the agriculture and public sectors, and the percentage claiming unemployment benefits is low. White people made up 95% of the population at the 2021 census.

At the district council level, most of this constituency is represented by Conservatives with some localists elected in Stone. At the county council, which held elections more recently (in 2025), most seats were won by Reform UK. Voters in Stone, Great Wyrley and Penkridge strongly supported leaving the European Union in the 2016 referendum; an estimated 62% voted in favour of Brexit compared to the UK-wide figure of 52%.

== Boundaries ==
Taking into account a local government boundary review in South Staffordshire which came into effect in May 2023, the constituency comprises the following from the 2024 general election:

- The District of South Staffordshire wards of: Brewood, Coven & Blymhill; Cheslyn Hay Village; Essington; Featherstone, Shareshill & Saredon; Great Wyrley Landywood; Great Wyrley Town; Huntington & Hatherton; Lapley, Stretton & Wheaton Aston; Penkridge North & Acton Trussell; Penkridge South & Gailey.
- The Borough of Stafford wards of Haywood & Hixon; Milford; Milwich; St. Michael’s & Stonefield; Walton.

It comprises the three eponymous communities interspersed largely with rural areas:

- Stone was previously in the abolished constituency of Stone
- Great Wyrley, along with adjoining built up areas such as Cheslyn Hay, was part of the former constituency of South Staffordshire, which has been reconfigured and renamed Kingswinford and South Staffordshire
- Penkridge was transferred from Stafford

== History ==
Following the announcement that Sir Bill Cash, the MP for Stone, would not be standing at the next general election, Sir Gavin Williamson, the previous MP for South Staffordshire, was chosen as the Conservative candidate for this seat in July 2023. He won the seat at the 2024 election with a 12.8% majority. Reform UK did not stand a candidate.

== Elections ==
=== Elections in the 2020s ===
General election 2024: Stone, Great Wyrley and Penkridge
Party	Candidate	Votes	%	±%
Conservative	Gavin Williamson	19,880	46.5	−22.0
Labour	Jacqueline Brown	14,414	33.7	+12.1
Liberal Democrats	Sam Harper-Wallis	2,952	6.9	+0.4
UKIP	Janice MacKay	2,638	6.2	N/A
Green	Danni Braine	2,236	5.2	+1.8
SDP	Alexander Bramham	650	1.5	N/A
Majority		5,466	12.8	−34.1
Turnout		42,770	59.8	−6.3
Registered electors		71,570		
Conservative win (new seat)				
