= Chase Line =

Railway line in the West Midlands, England

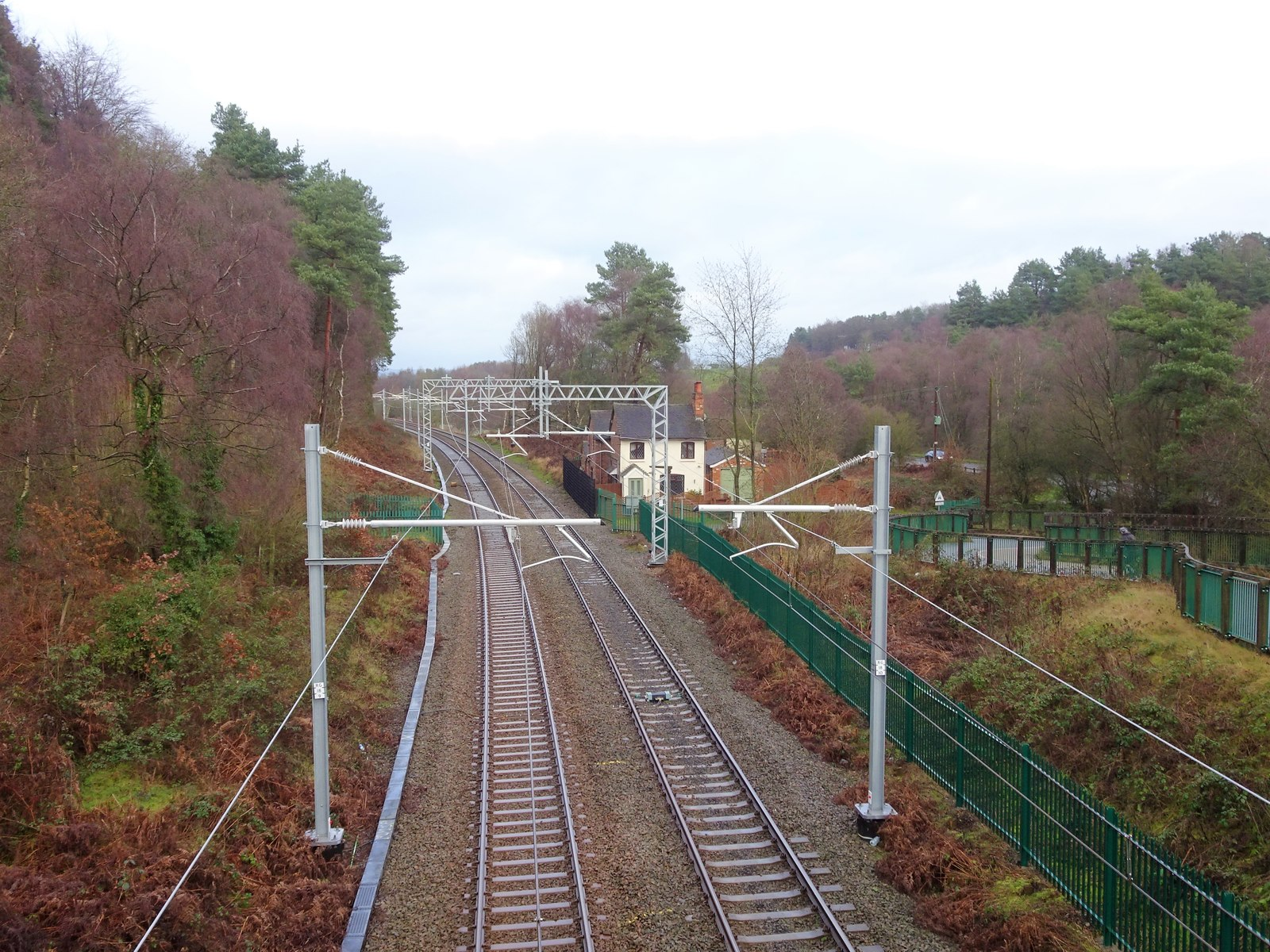
- Chase Line

Overview
- Status: Operational
- Owner: Network Rail
- Locale: West Midlands
- Termini: Rugeley Trent Valley; Walsall; Birmingham New Street
- Stations: 17

Service
- Type: Suburban rail, Heavy rail
- System: National Rail
- Operator: West Midlands Railway
- Depot: Bescot
- Rolling stock: Class 730

Technical
- Track gauge: 1,435 mm (4 ft 8 1/2 in) standard gauge
- Electrification: 25 kV AC OHLE
Route map
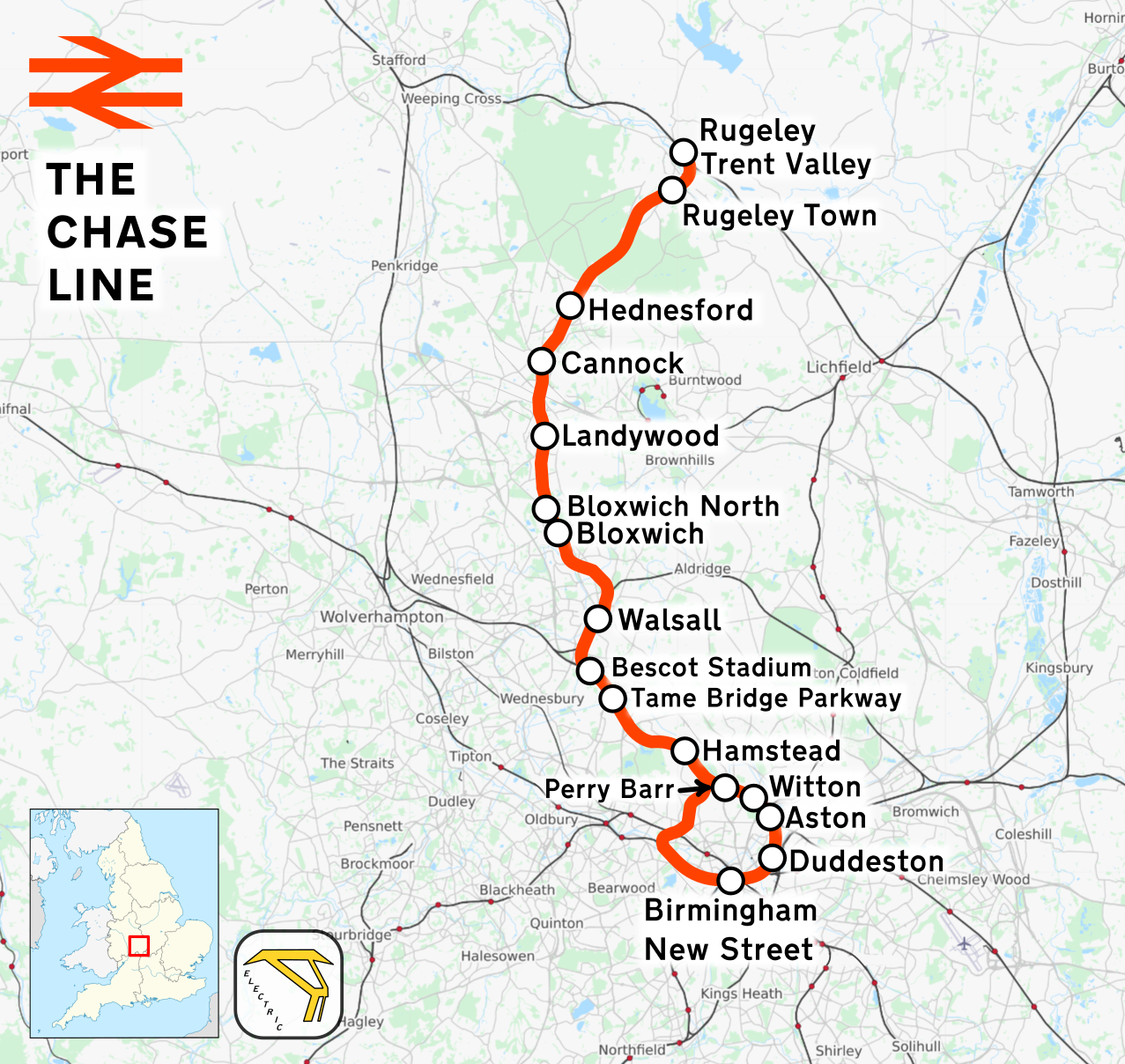

The Chase Line is a suburban railway line in the West Midlands region of England. It runs from its southern terminus, Birmingham New Street, to Walsall, and then Rugeley Trent Valley in Staffordshire, where it joins the Trent Valley line. The name of the line refers to Cannock Chase which it runs through at its northern end.

Part of the line, between Birmingham and Walsall, has been electrified since 1966; work to electrify the remaining 15 mile stretch of line between Walsall and Rugeley, was completed in December 2018.

== History ==
- The line from Birmingham via Aston, Perry Barr and Bescot was opened in 1837 as part of one of the earliest railway main lines; the Grand Junction Railway (GJR). This line did not serve Walsall directly, but continued from Bescot to Wolverhampton (this is now part of the Walsall–Wolverhampton line). A station on the GJR called Walsall was opened on the outskirts of the town, this was later renamed Wood Green, and is now closed. The GJR became part of the London and North Western Railway (LNWR) in 1846.
- The section through Walsall, including the present Walsall station was opened in 1849 by the South Staffordshire Railway, as part of their (now closed) South Staffordshire line from Dudley to Wychnor Junction, north of Lichfield, a connection was opened from Walsall to the GJR at Bescot, allowing direct Walsall-Birmingham trains.
- The section between Walsall and Rugeley Trent Valley was constructed by the South Staffordshire Railway, and the Cannock Mineral Railway (CMR): The South Staffordshire Railway built the line from Walsall to Cannock, opening in 1858, and the CMR built the line from Cannock to Rugeley, opening in 1859. The South Staffordshire Railway was absorbed by the LNWR in 1867, as was the CMR two years later.
- The last part of what is now the Chase Line, the Soho Loop Line; a link running from Perry Barr Junction on the original GJR to Soho Junction on the Stour Valley Line, allowing an alternative route into Birmingham from the west which bypassed Aston, was opened by the LNWR in 1889. Two stations were opened on this line; Soho Road and Handsworth Wood, both were closed in 1941.

=== Walsall – Rugeley: closure and reopening ===
Passenger services on the line between Walsall and Rugeley Trent Valley were withdrawn in 1965, and the intermediate stations closed as part of the Beeching Axe, the line however remained open to freight, although until the 1980s it was not unknown for diverted Inter-City passenger services from Birmingham to Manchester, Edinburgh, Glasgow, etc. to use the line in the event of the Wolverhampton-Stafford route being shut for Sunday or late evening engineering work.

Passenger services were restored to the line and most of the stations reopened between 1989 and 1998, as part of a joint initiative between the West Midlands Passenger Transport Executive (WMPTE) and Staffordshire County Council. The name Chase Line was invented as a marketing name for the restored line, and came into use at this time. The restoration took place in stages, as follows:

- 10 April 1989 — Walsall to Hednesford
- 2 June 1997 — Hednesford to Rugeley Town
- 25 May 1998 — Rugeley Town to Rugeley Trent Valley and Stafford
- 12 December 2008 — Chase Line trains are cut back from Stafford to Rugeley Trent Valley.
- 22 May 2018 — Chase Line trains increased to a 30-minute frequency Monday to Saturday, with a 60-minute frequency on Sunday
- 19 May 2019 — Electric passenger services begin north of Walsall. In addition to this, services are extended to Birmingham International (2tph).

== Route ==
The line from Birmingham to Walsall (sometimes referred to as the Walsall Line) has two alternative routes, both electrified at 25 kV AC overhead. One leaves New Street to the east, following the Cross-City Line as far as Aston, where it diverges to the west. The other leaves to the west, and travels via Soho. Beyond Walsall, the line was electrified in 2019, and continues north to Rugeley. This section was freight-only for some years, reopening to passenger trains in stages between 1989 and 1998.

Places served on the route are listed below. For information on the stations, please refer to the list in the route map.

Chase Line (Birmingham - Walsall - Rugeley)

- Rugeley Town & Rugeley Trent Valley – Interchange services to London Euston and Crewe railway station.
- Brindley Heath (closed in 1959)
- Hednesford
- Cannock
- Great Wyrley (closed in 1965)
- Landywood
- Bloxwich North
- Bloxwich
- Walsall
- Bescot (for Bescot Stadium, the home of Walsall FC), Wednesbury
- Stone Cross (near Tame Bridge Parkway station)
- Hamstead
- Perry Barr
- Witton – for Villa Park
- Aston – for Aston Villa F.C. and Aston Hall
- Duddeston
- Birmingham New Street (Interchange for Bullring, ICC, Symphony Hall & The Mailbox)
  - Services then continue onwards to Wolverhampton or Birmingham International via the Rugby–Birmingham–Stafford line.

Passenger trains are operated by West Midlands Railway on behalf of Transport for West Midlands.

== Services ==
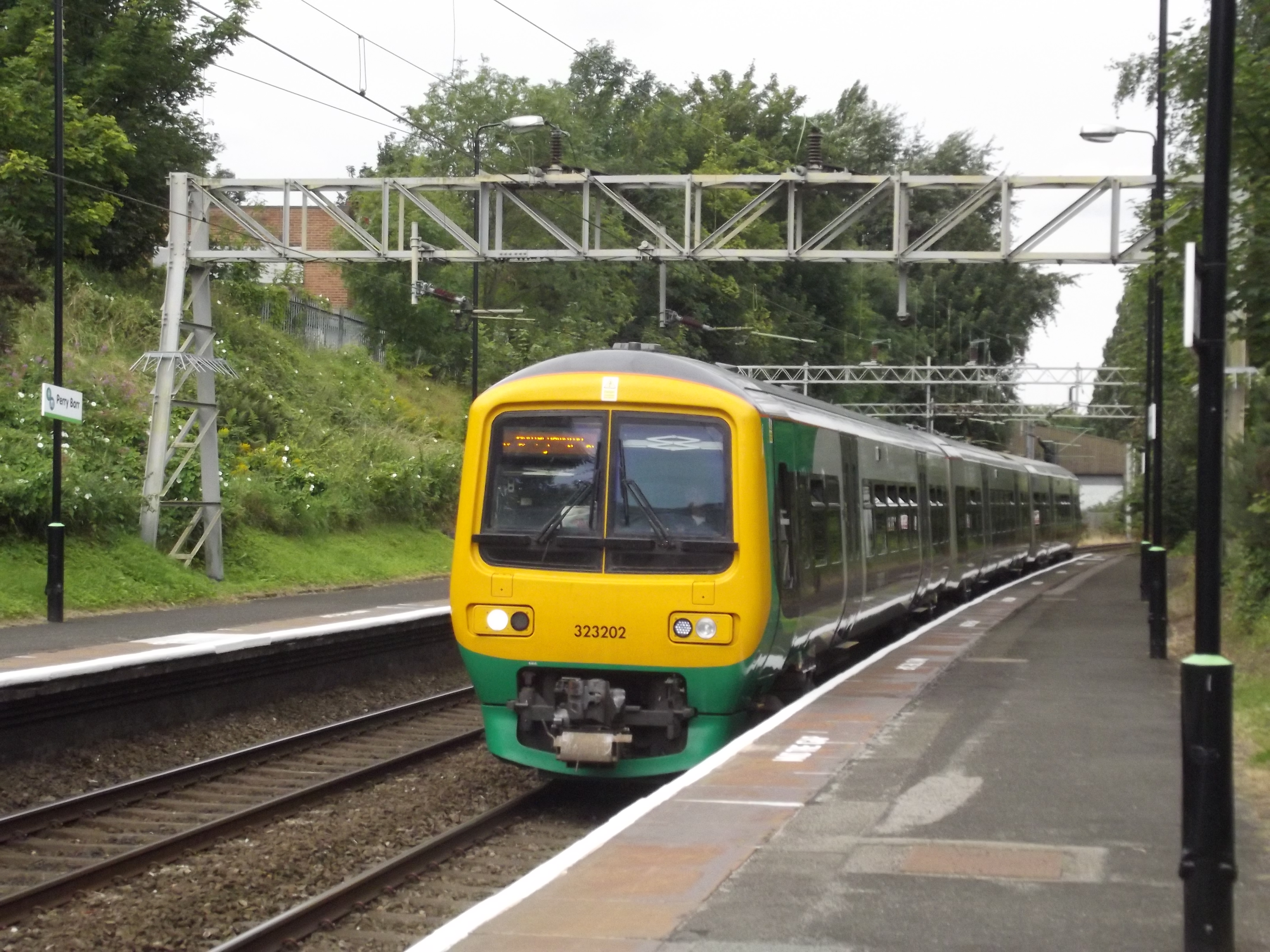
A Class 323 calls at Perry Barr in 2012.

Monday to Saturday daytime there are four trains per hour from Birmingham New Street to Walsall. Two per hour run via Aston and call at all stations, the other two per hour run direct via Soho and call at Tame Bridge Parkway and Walsall. Two of these per-hour continue to Rugeley Trent Valley during the day, dropping to one in the late evenings.

There is also a 6am service from Wolverhampton to Rugeley Trent Valley but this is only one way. It runs the entire Birmingham to Walsall section calling at all stations then onto the Chase Line.

As of May 2019, following the electrification of the line north of Walsall, West Midlands Trains began operating 2tph (Mon–Sat) from Rugeley Trent Valley to Birmingham International with 1tph continuing to Northampton or London Euston. On Sundays, all services from Rugeley terminate at Coventry. All services are operated by Class 730 EMUs, Tracks are also Shared with the Cross-City Line between Birmingham New Street and Aston.

== Electrification ==
The line between Birmingham New Street and Walsall was electrified in 1966 as an offshoot of the West Coast Main Line electrification, along with the Walsall–Wolverhampton line.

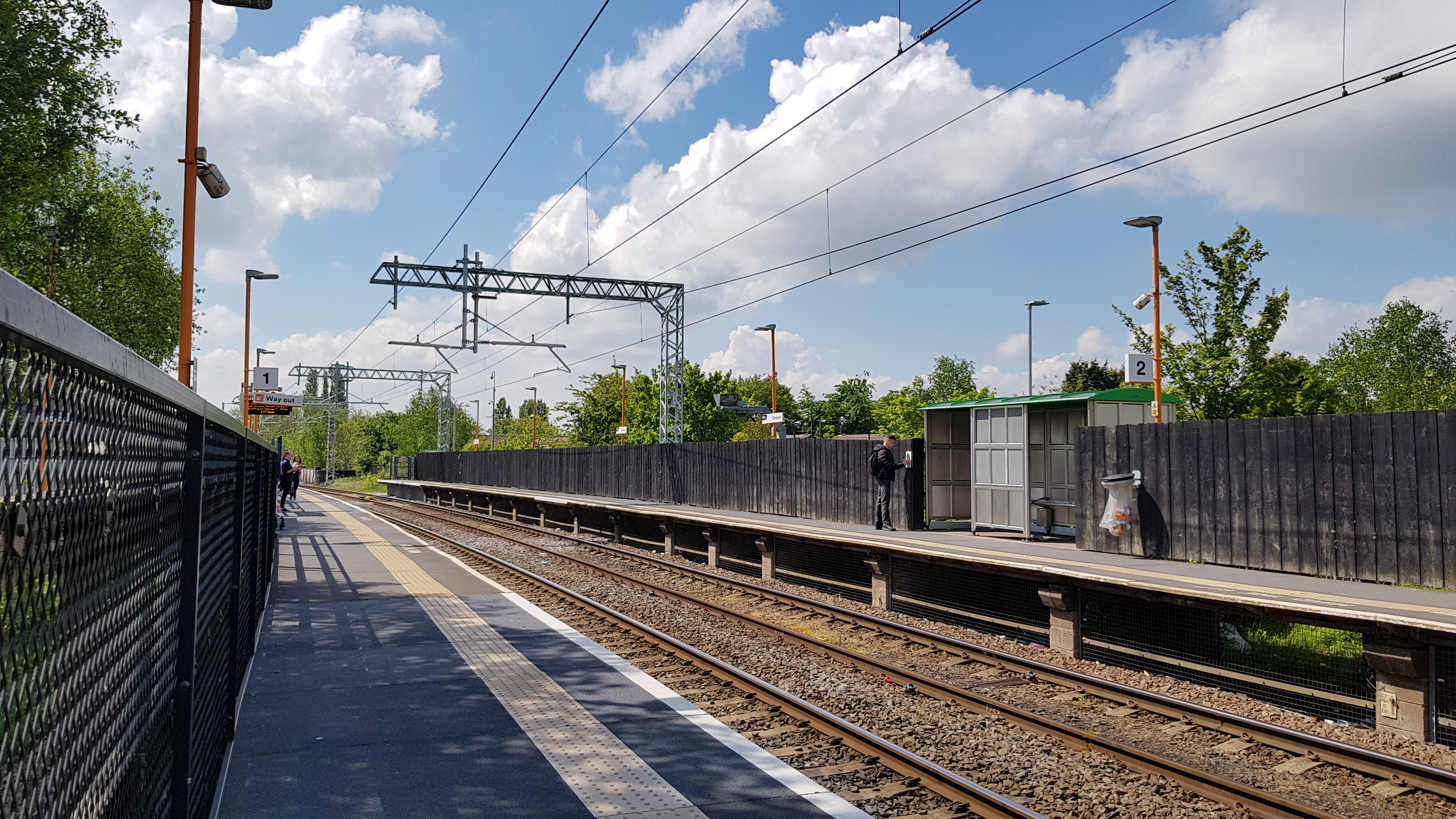
Cannock railway station following the completion of electrification.

In July 2012, the coalition government announced the electrification of the Chase Line between Rugeley Trent Valley and Walsall, with work scheduled to take place from 2014. It was estimated to cost around £36 million, as part of a £9.4 billion package of investment in the railways in England and Wales, including £4.2 billion of new schemes, unveiled by the government. Preliminary work to re-signal the route ahead of electrification was completed in August 2013, with the closure of the three remaining manual signal boxes at Bloxwich, Hednesford & Brereton Sidings and the panel boxes at Walsall & Bescot. Control of the area passed to the Saltley Rail Operating Centre.

The work originally had an estimated completion date of December 2017, but previously unknown mine shafts underneath the track meant that many bases for the overhead infrastructure had to be redesigned. Network Rail closed the line in August 2017 for two weeks. The electrification was finally completed in December 2018, the first electric train services started in May 2019.

=== Effects of electrification of the line ===
The electrification of the line was accompanied by a speed increase from 45 mph (72 km/h) to 60 mph (97 km/h). Bloxwich level crossing closed to motorised traffic in January 2018, and the bridge at Central Drive, north of the crossing, had been strengthened and widened to improve the alternative route. This enabled a 25 mph (40 km/h) speed limit to be lifted to 50 mph (80 km/h). It also enabled the line to transport W10 freight containers.

For passengers using the stations north of Walsall, the changes meant shorter journey times and longer trains, which reduced overcrowding to Birmingham with 2 trains per hour (tph) for the whole day, continuing direct to Birmingham International (1tph). The electrification itself created over 1,300 jobs in the area and generated a further £113 million of gross value added (GVA) benefit per annum, as well as reducing the operating costs of the line. In May 2014, London Midland announced that it was intending to run longer trains on the route, requiring station platforms to be extended to accommodate.

Gavin Williamson, Conservative MP for South Staffordshire, campaigned to limit the speed of trains through Great Wyrley and Cheslyn Hay when the upgrade work of the line was to be completed. He wrote to then Transport Secretary Patrick McLoughlin, to request confirmation that trains travelling through the areas would not exceed a speed of 45 mph. He also requested that "environmental mitigation measures" be put in place to reduce the potential impact of the electrification on residents in South Staffordshire. Network Rail had previously said that electric trains are quieter, greener and cleaner, reducing carbon emissions.
