= Rugeley Town railway station =

Railway station in Staffordshire, England

Rugeley Town
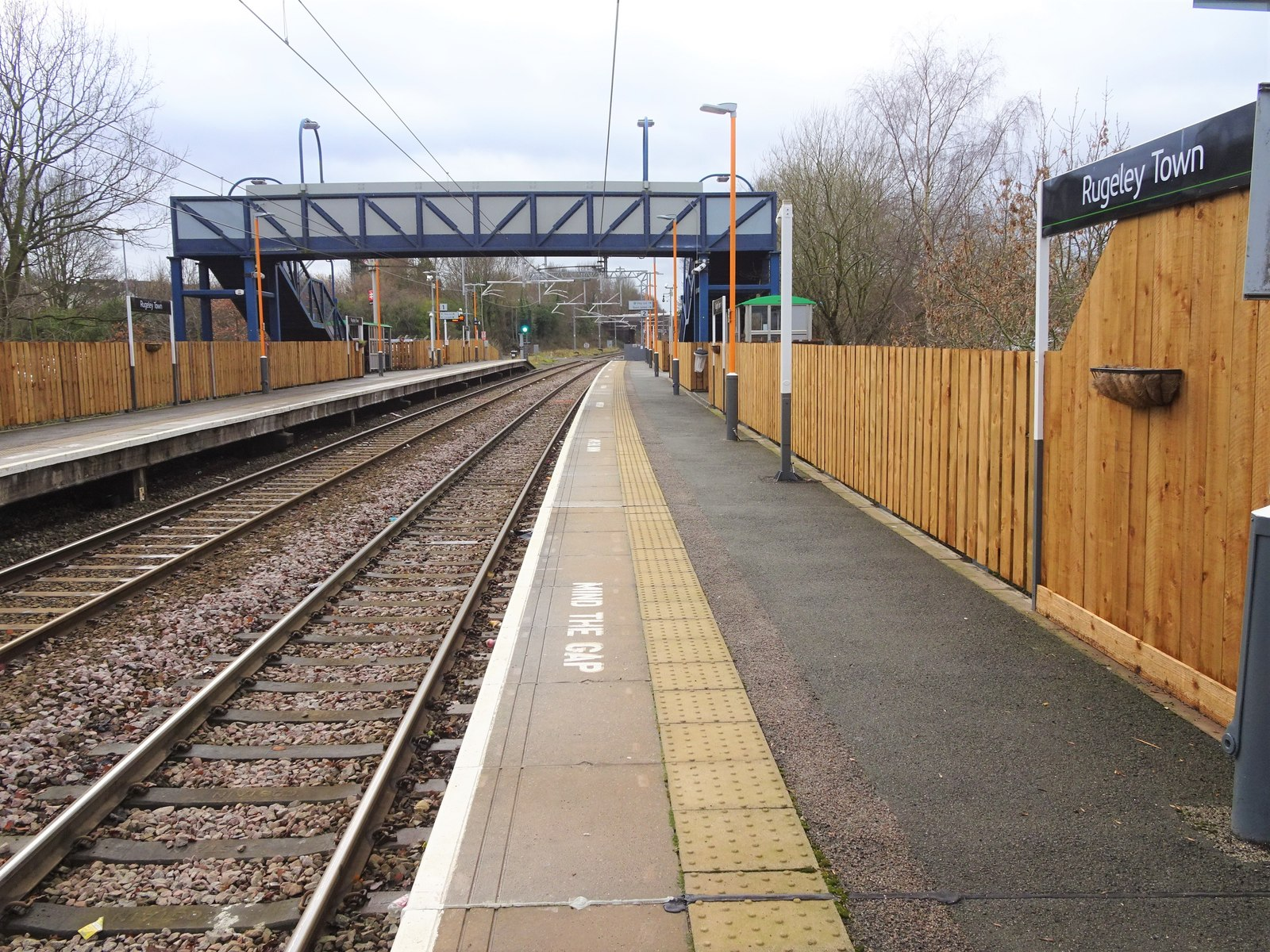

General information
- Location: Rugeley, Cannock Chase, England
- Coordinates: 52.754°N 1.937°W
- Grid reference: SK043174
- Manager: West Midlands Railway
- Platforms: 2

Other information
- Station code: RGT
- Classification: DfT category F2

History
- Original company: London and North Western Railway
- Pre-grouping: London and North Western Railway
- Post-grouping: London, Midland and Scottish Railway

Key dates
- 1 June 1870: Opened
- 18 January 1965: Closed
- 2 June 1997: Reopened

Passengers
- 2021/22: ▲0.106 million
- 2022/23: ▲0.120 million
- 2023/24: ▲0.164 million
- 2024/25: ▲0.185 million
- 2025/26: ▲0.205 million
Location
Notes
- Passenger statistics from the Office of Rail and Road

Rugeley Town railway station serves the market town of Rugeley, in Staffordshire, England. It is managed by West Midlands Trains, with services operated under their West Midlands Railway and London Northwestern Railway brand names. The station is situated around half a mile from Rugeley town centre, on Wharf Road.

== History ==
The original station was opened by the London and North Western Railway on 1 June 1870. The station, together with all those on the line between Walsall and Rugeley Trent Valley, were closed on 18 January 1965 as part of the Beeching Axe, although the line remained open as freight-only. The station closed to goods on 6 September 1965.

A new station opened in 1997, some 250m south of the original, as the second stage of the reopening to passengers of the Chase Line saw the extension of services beyond Hednesford. The following year, the short section of track between Rugeley Town and Rugeley Trent Valley stations was also reopened, allowing services to be extended via the Trent Valley section of the West Coast Main Line to Stafford (though through running there ended at the December 2008 timetable change).

In May 2019, a new service to London Euston commenced, operated by London Northwestern Railway. This service was later suspended, due to the impact of the COVID-19 pandemic in the United Kingdom, and cut back to Birmingham International.

In April 2011, the area was still mechanically signalled from the Brereton Sidings signal box immediately south of the station on the east side of the line (the sidings are no longer extant, though there is still a rail connection to the site of the adjacent coal-fired Rugeley power stations), but the box closed in 2013 (along with neighbouring Hednesford & Bloxwich boxes and the PSB at Walsall) as part of the ongoing West Midlands re-signalling scheme. Control passed to the West Midlands Signalling Centre at Saltley, though in the long term the WCML South Rail Operating Centre at Rugby will have responsibility for this part of the country.

== Services ==
Rugeley Town is served by West Midlands Trains, under the West Midlands Railway brand, using Class 730 electric multiple units.

There is typically a half-hourly service northbound to Rugeley Trent Valley and southbound to Birmingham International, via Walsall and Birmingham New Street. On Sundays, the service reduces to hourly.

Journey times are typically 4 minutes to Rugeley Trent Valley, 26 minutes to Walsall and 49 minutes to Birmingham New Street.

Preceding station	National Rail	Following station
Rugeley Trent Valley	West Midlands Railway; Rugeley - Walsall - Birmingham; Chase Line	Hednesford
Rugeley Trent Valley	West Midlands Railway; Rugeley - Walsall - Birmingham - Wolverhampton; Limited service	Hednesford
