= Listed buildings in Cheslyn Hay =

Cheslyn Hay is a civil parish in the district of South Staffordshire, Staffordshire, England. It contains two listed buildings that are recorded in the National Heritage List for England. Both the listed buildings are designated at Grade II, the lowest of the three grades, which is applied to "buildings of national importance and special interest". The listed buildings consist of a row of cottages with a timber framed core, and a war memorial.

== Buildings ==
Name and location	Photograph	DateA	Notes
14 and 16 Dundalk Lane; 52.65842°N 2.03299°W		17th century	A row of three cottages that were altered in the 18th and 20th centuries. They have a timber framed core that was largely replaced in red brick, and the roof is tiled. There is one storey and an attic, and three bays. The windows are casements, there are four gabled dormers, and at the rear is exposed timber framing.
War memorial 52.66162°N 2.03156°W		1921	The war memorial stands at a road junction, and consists of a rough-hewn obelisk in Cornish granite. The obelisk is on a square plinth on a rough-hewn base with projecting blocks on each corner. On the sides of the plinth are marble plaques, one with an inscription and the others with the names of those lost in the First World War. On the base is another plaque with an inscription and the names of those lost in the Second World War.
