= Cheslyn Hay Academy =

Location
- Saredon Road; Cheslyn Hay; Staffordshire, WS6 7JQ; England
- Coordinates: 52.6609°N 2.0435°W

Information
- Type: Academy
- Local authority: Staffordshire
- Trust: Windsor Academy Trust
- Department for Education URN: 146443 Tables
- Ofsted: Reports
- Headteacher: Jenny Pritchard
- Gender: Mixed
- Age: 11 to 18
- Enrolment: 1313 as of October 2022
- Website: www.cheslynhay-high.staffs.sch.uk

Cheslyn Hay Academy (formerly Cheslyn Hay Sport and Community High School) is a mixed secondary school and sixth form located in Cheslyn Hay in the English county of Staffordshire.

Previously a community school administered by Staffordshire County Council, in December 2018 Cheslyn Hay Sport and Community High School converted to academy status and was renamed Cheslyn Hay Academy. The school is now sponsored by The Windsor Academy Trust.

The catchment area of the school includes Cheslyn Hay, Essington and Featherstone, However the school also attracts pupils who live further afield, including some from the West Midlands.

Cheslyn Hay Academy offers GCSEs as programmes of study for pupils, while students in the sixth form have the option to study from a range of A-levels.

The school (then Cheslyn Hay High School) became part of an investigation into the unsolved murder in December 1993 at Manchester of Kuwaiti businessman Adnan al Sane when his battered severed head was found having been thrown into the school playing field. Despite the successful identification of his head, the murderers were never traced.
