= Cheslyn Hay =

Village and civil parish in Staffordshire, England

Coordinates: 52.66041°N 2.03642°W

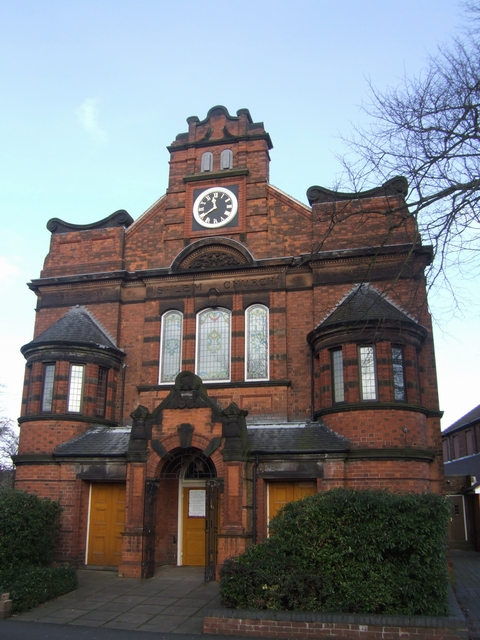
- Salem Church, Cheslyn Hay a prominent landmark in the village

- Location within Staffordshire
- Population: 7,293 (2011)
- OS grid reference: SJ976069
- District: South Staffordshire
- Shire county: Staffordshire
- Region: West Midlands
- Country: England
- Sovereign state: United Kingdom
- Post town: WALSALL
- Postcode district: WS6
- Dialling code: 01922
- Police: Staffordshire
- Fire: Staffordshire
- Ambulance: West Midlands
- UK Parliament: Stone, Great Wyrley and Penkridge

Cheslyn Hay is a village and civil parish in the South Staffordshire district of Staffordshire, England. It is 3 miles south of Cannock, 10 miles north of Walsall, 9 miles northeast of Wolverhampton, and 13 miles south of Stafford. The village forms a built-up area with the villages and areas of Great Wyrley, Landywood, and Churchbridge.

== History ==
During the 19th century, the area was known colloquially as the Wyrley Bank (in the local dialect Wyrley Bonk).

Before World War II there was a cinema at the top of Rosemary Road, on the site much later occupied by Barts Motors, later converted into salon. The housing stock has grown significantly in each post-war decade, with suburban expansion into surrounding fields.

Salem Methodist Church stands on the High Street. Dating from 1855, it is a locally listed building.

Littlewood is an area in the northern part of the civil parish of Cheslyn Hay. The name has been historically recorded as "Luttelwode" (1380) and in the nineteenth century as two words, Little Wood. Littlewood had seen an expansion of housing by the 1960s.

Cheslyn Hay became part of an investigation into the unsolved murder in 1993 of Kuwaiti businessman Adnan al Sane, when his battered severed head was found there having been thrown into the playing field of the then High School. The victim, whose body was found in Manchester, had no connection with this area and despite his successful identification, the murderers were never traced.

== Governance ==
Cheslyn Hay Parish Council has councillors representing the wards of Littlewood, Pinfold and South. The chairman is currently Steve Hollis.

There are four representatives on South Staffordshire District Council:

Member Since	Member	Ward
1995	Bernard Williams	Cheslyn Hay Village
2023	Susan Duncan	Cheslyn Hay Village
2023	Robert Duncan	Cheslyn Hay Village

== Business and industry ==
Station Street is the main street with some small shops. A major employer in the village is B.S. Eaton Ltd, a manufacturer of concrete products who operates a fleet of distinctive orange trucks. Another large employer is PP Control & Automation Ltd, a manufacturer of automation machinery.

== Education ==
The old primary school, built in approximately 1883, was situated on the site bounded by Hatherton Street, Pinfold Lane, Hill Street, and High Street. It was demolished in the 1990s and the land was used for new housing. An additional modern building on the opposite side of Pinfold Lane was used for school meals and a gym.

The village is now served by two primary schools, Glenthorne Primary School and Cheslyn Hay Primary School, and one secondary school, Cheslyn Hay Academy.

== Notable residents ==
- Charlie Moore (born 1893 in Cheslyn Hay - 1966), was an English football full back. In his early days, he played for Hednesford Town. In May 1919, he was sold to Manchester United. He stayed with United until his retirement in 1931. During his United career, he made 328 appearances, although he scored no goals.
- Anthony Read (1935 in Cheslyn Hay – 2015) was a British script editor, television writer, and author. He was principally active in British television from the 1960s to the mid-1980s

== Public Transport ==
Rail

Landywood railway station, which opened in 1989, is the nearest station. Previously the village was served by Wyrley and Cheslyn Hay railway station which closed in 1965. Until 1 January 1916, the LNWR also operated a halt at nearby Landywood.

Landywood station provides services south to Birmingham New Street and north to Rugeley Trent Valley. It is currently operated by the West Midlands Railway franchise.

Buses

Cheslyn Hay acts as a hub to Cannock and Wolverhampton There are two services operated by Chaserider:

- Route 70 - Cannock to Wolverhampton via Longford and Featherstone
- Route 71 - Cannock to Wolverhampton via Essington and Wednesfield

These services were previously operated by Arriva Midlands. Select Bus began operating service 71 following Arriva axing the service while D&G Bus began operating services 2 & 70 in January 2021 following the acquisition of Arriva's Cannock depot.

In May 2021, Chaserider announced a number of service changes which came into effect on 21 June 2021. This saw service 71 operated by Chaserider, service 70 to serve New Cross Hospital before Wolverhampton and service 74 extended hourly to Walsall. The 74 extension was curtailed back to Cannock and replaced by 1A serving Cannock and Walsall via Leamore, but this was later withdrawn due to low usage. At present there is no direct service to Walsall. Service 70 and 71 continue to provide a half-hourly link to Cannock but service 70 no longer serves New Cross Hospital and the 71 only serves Wolverhampton on a few journeys.

Select Bus operates school services 67S and 71A that run during term time to Cheslyn Hay Academy. Chaserider Service 70 also calls in at the school twice daily.

== See also ==
- Listed buildings in Cheslyn Hay
