= Chaserider =

Bus operator in the West Midlands of England

- Wright Eclipse 2 bodied Volvo B7RLE in Lichfield in March 2026
- Parent: Centrebus Group
- Founded: January 2021; 5 years ago
- Locale: Staffordshire; West Midlands
- Service area: Cannock; Stafford; Uttoxeter; Lichfield; Walsall; Wolverhampton
- Depots: 1
- Fleet: 66 (September 2026)
- Operations manager: Raj Chander
- Website: www.chaserider.co.uk

Chaserider is the brand name for bus services operated around Cannock and Staffordshire by D&G Bus, a local bus operator owned by Centrebus who are based in Adderley Green, Stoke-on-Trent, Staffordshire.

== History ==
The Chaserider brand name, which refers to Cannock Chase, was first used by National Bus Company subsidiary Midland Red from 1977 until 1992.

During November 2020, Centrebus Group subsidiary D&G Bus announced they would be taking over the Cannock depot of Arriva Midlands from the end of January 2021 with operations in Cannock and Stafford running under the revived Chaserider brand.

== Services ==
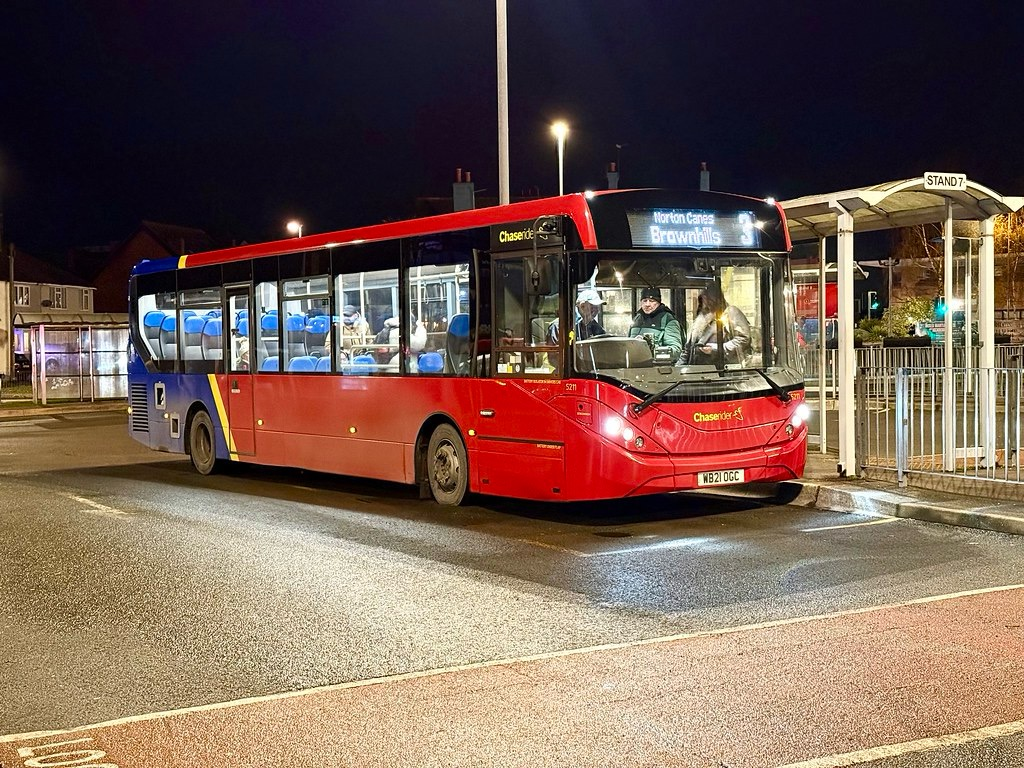
Alexander Dennis Enviro200 MMC at Cannock bus station in January 2026

Chaserider services operate mainly around Cannock and Stafford with some further afield into Wolverhampton and Walsall.

Since taking over from Arriva Midlands in January 2021, Chaserider have undertaken a number of service reviews including a trial of running the Pye Green circular buses on Sundays via Designer Outlet West Midlands. Some of the Stafford town centre network inherited from Arriva were transferred to Select Bus Services.

From June 2021, Chaserider introduced a new service X14 between Cannock, Shifnal, Telford and Oakengates. This had six journeys in each direction, but was withdrawn in January 2022 owing to low passenger numbers.

'Travel Telford' branded Alexander Dennis Enviro200 MMC in Lichfield in April 2024

From February 2023, Chaserider began operating subsidised services 102 and 103 along with school services 104 and 105 in the Telford area. Also operated under contract to Telford and Wrekin Council, Chaserider also began to operate service 100 in late 2022. These services utilise a fleet of six branded Alexander Dennis Enviro200 MMCs.

Service 1 which operated between Cannock and Walsall and ran every 20 minutes at its peak was curtailed to operate only between Cheslyn Hay and Cannock from the summer 2022. This was controversial as at the same time, National Express West Midlands cut its competing X51 between Cannock and Walsall, which continues to Birmingham, to every 30 minutes from 20 minutes between the two towns.

In July 2023, Chaserider commenced operations on behalf of Transport for West Midlands (TfWM) and Staffordshire County Council, running services 35A and 36 between Walsall, Aldridge and Lichfield. Additionally, service 19 between Walsall and Bloxwich in October 2023 commenced under contract, however due to antisocial behaviour in the Coal Pool area the service was diverted, finished early and briefly withdrawn until an alternative operator was found. Service 19 is now operated by Carolean Coaches.

In November 2023, Chaserider replaced National Express West Midlands on service 5, running between Wolverhampton and Codsall, on evenings and Sundays. Daytime journeys were operated by Banga Buses. In May 2025, Chaserider then replaced Banga Buses to operate the whole 5 service. In September 2025, the evening and Sunday journeys were taken over by National Express West Midlands under tender.

June 2024 saw the extension of the 63 Cannock to Rugeley via Brereton linking onto Uttoxeter, with some journeys subcontracted to Bus Link, and July 2024 saw the 35A Walsall to Leighswood service withdrawn and replaced with a new 36A, extending from Leighswood to Lichfield via Muckley Corner. Since January 2025, the 36 has operated on Sundays. These changes are on behalf of Transport for West Midlands (TfWM) and Staffordshire County Council.

It was revealed in May 2025 that Arriva Midlands had won the tenders for all Telford services that Chaserider operated. Chaserider ceased operating serices in Telford during July 2025.

Chaserider began operating service 57, which runs between Wolverhampton and Bilston (currently curtailed to Willenhall due to long running road works in the area), in November 2025 which was previously operated by Diamond. From January 2026, service 25 between Wolverhampton and Pendeford transferred from National Express West Midlands to Chaserider.

== Fleet ==
As of September 2026, the Chaserider fleet consists of 66 buses operating from a depot on Delta Way in Cannock.
