= Cannock Mineral Railway =

The Cannock Mineral Railway was a railway company that built a line from Cannock (Staffordshire,) to join the London and North Western Railway (LNWR) at Rugeley, in England. It was conceived and authorised as the Derbyshire, Staffordshire and Worcestershire Junction Railway, with the intention of connecting Dudley and Uttoxeter, but it was hopelessly undercapitalised and badly managed.

As finally built it was seven miles in length, and joined the South Staffordshire Railway (SSR) at Cannock. It was leased to, and then absorbed by the LNWR, and with the SSR it simply formed part of the LNWR network in the district, chiefly serving extractive industries.

It opened to passenger and goods traffic in 1859. Passenger traffic was discontinued in 1965, but was resumed in 1989 and is still (2022) in operation, with a typically half-hourly service operated by West Midlands Trains under the branding London Northwestern.

== Development of scheme ==
=== Early proposals ===
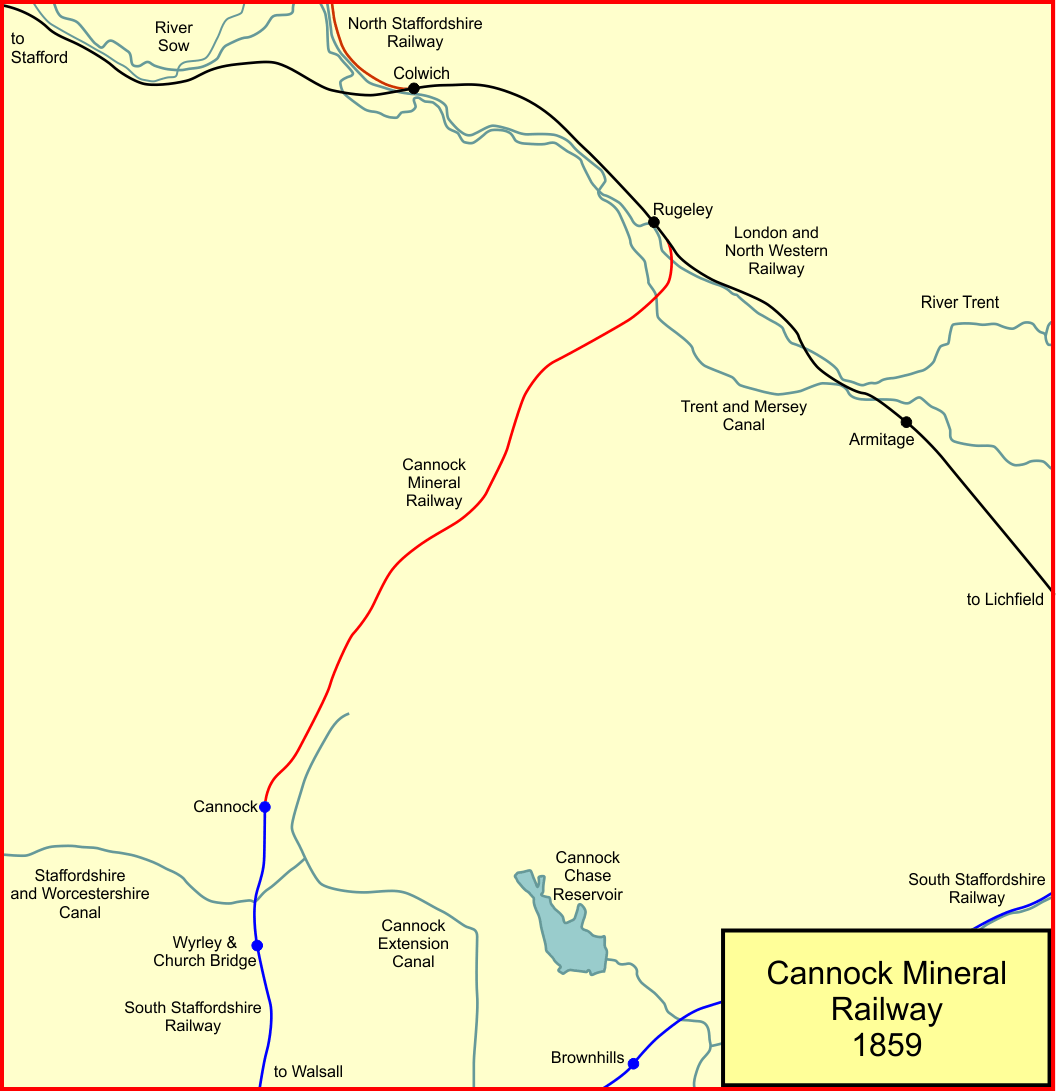
The Cannock Mineral Railway system

An ambitious railway scheme called the Derbyshire, Staffordshire and Worcestershire Junction Railway was proposed during the Railway Mania period of 1846. It was intended to connect Uttoxeter to Dudley, and by running powers over the North Staffordshire Railway to connect to Manchester.

The route had been surveyed by Sir John Rennie and George Remington; during the Parliament hearings, Rennie admitted that he had never laid a line through such a thinly populated district. This proved to be a fatal remark, as the South Staffordshire Junction Railway (SSJR) Bill was passed in Parliament at the same time. The SSJR scheme was for a railway linking Walsall and Dudley, and the DS&WJR proposal included similar ground. Two new railways over a thinly populated terrain were unsustainable, and the SSJR scheme looked more fruitful; the DS&WJR Bill was thrown out by the Lords Committee.

Derbyshire, Staffordshire and Worcestershire Junction Railway Act 1847
- Act of Parliament
- Parliament of the United Kingdom
- Long title: An Act to authorize the Construction of a Railway from Cannock in the County of Stafford to Uttoxeter in the same County, to join the North Staffordshire Railway Potteries Line, by a Company to be called "The Derbyshire, Staffordshire, and Worcestershire Junction Railway Company."
- Citation: 10 & 11 Vict. c. cx

Dates
- Royal assent: 2 July 1847

Other legislation
- Repealed by: Cannock Mineral Railway Act 1855

Status: Repealed

Text of statute as originally enacted

In the next session of Parliament, the SSJR was proposing an additional line, from Walsall to Cannock. The DS&WJR too was in Parliament in the next session with a revised scheme. Avoiding a second confrontation with the SSJR, it put forward a more modest proposal, a railway from Uttoxeter to Cannock. It proposed to make an end-on junction with the North Staffordshire Railway at Uttoxeter, and another at Cannock with the SSJR. The bill passed through Parliament, the Derbyshire, Staffordshire and Worcestershire Junction Railway Act 1847 (10 & 11 Vict. c. cx) receiving royal assent on 2 July 1847. The authorised share capital was £440,000, and the line was to be 18 miles in length.

A contractor named George Mould was given the contract to build from Rugeley to Cannock. However ten months later on 26 November 1852 the company's engineer John Addison reported that work had been suspended due to the very bad state of the weather, and the following year on 16 September 1853 he reported that little had been done since his last inspection. Addison was criticised by the board and was suspended, but a month later on 19 December 1853 he was reinstated.

=== Speeding up the construction ===
The powers granted for construction of the line by the Derbyshire, Staffordshire and Worcestershire Junction Railway Act 1847 were time limited, and by now there were only six months left. At the annual general meeting on 25 February 1854 it was agreed to seek an extension of time. More significantly it was recognised that a lack of sufficient share take-up meant that the company had little money to proceed with the project, and a major partner would be required, with enough financial backing to enable the construction to move forward. In 1852 Addison had prepared a scheme for an extension from Cannock to Wolverhampton via Four Ashes, connecting with the Great Western Railway. Further plans were made to join the GWR at Wednesbury instead, and a partnership with the GWR was proposed. Addison was instructed to approach Isambard Kingdom Brunel, the Engineer of the GWR, and on 16 July Addison reported that Brunel was favourably disposed to the idea. However, the London and North Western Railway was dominant in the area and was known to be hostile; the scheme would need approval via an act of Parliament, and it was expected that the LNWR would be able to frustrate the GWR alliance.

Cannock Mineral Railway Act 1855
- Act of Parliament
- Parliament of the United Kingdom
- Long title: An Act to change the corporate Name of the Derbyshire, Staffordshire, and Worcestershire Junction Railway Company, to repeal their Act and consolidate their Powers, to alter and define their Undertaking, to reduce their Capital; and for other Purposes.
- Citation: 18 & 19 Vict. c. cxciv

Dates
- Royal assent: 14 August 1855

Text of statute as originally enacted

Cannock Mineral Railway Act 1857
- Act of Parliament
- Parliament of the United Kingdom
- Long title: An Act to extend the Time for the Completion of the Cannock Mineral Railway.
- Citation: 20 & 21 Vict. c. lxiv

Dates
- Royal assent: 27 July 1857

Text of statute as originally enacted

There was now desperation to find a well-funded partner. In 1854 and 1855 approaches were made for help to John McClean, the lessee of the South Staffordshire Railway, but he was not interested. On 7 May 1855 the board agreed to abandon any intention of proceeding north of Rugeley, making the planned extent of the line 7 1/2 miles; and to reduce the share capital to £200,000 (later altered to £160,000). In addition the name of the company was to be changed to the Cannock Mineral Railway. (Note: In many other cases the title "Mineral Railway" implied that only mineral traffic would be carried, but in this case the words merely referred to the dominance in the area of extractive industries.) The new company was authorised by the Cannock Mineral Railway Act 1855 (18 & 19 Vict. c. cxciv) of 14 August 1855.

In the 1857 session of Parliament, the company was seeking a time extension, and altered the proposed connection at the northern extremity to join the North Staffordshire Railway at Colwich, and omit the previous plan to connect with the LNWR. With this connection, the NSR contemplated making a line from Colwich to Wolverhampton. However the Marquis of Anglesey, a director of the LNWR and a substantial landowner, objected to the purchase of land for the bill, so the connection to the NSR could not be made. This all proved irrelevant as in March 1857 it became apparent that the CMR company did not even have the resources to proceed with the residual bill. The NSR was evidently still keen on the idea, so it agreed to pay for the costs of progressing with the bill, but this idea came to nothing.

=== Changing control ===
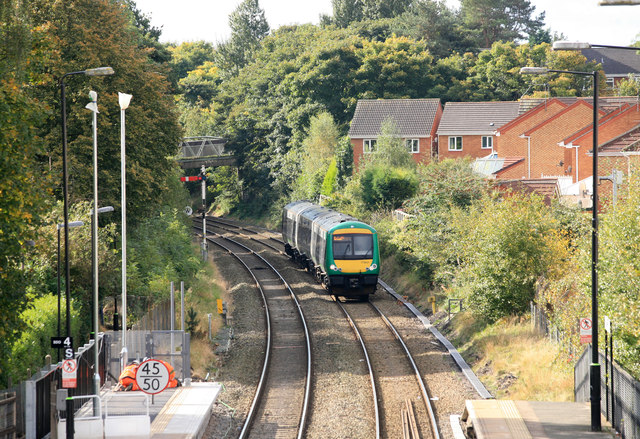
Arriving at Hednesford Station - geograph.org.uk - 3177533

The LNWR was evidently alarmed at the possibility of the North Staffordshire company forming this link up, and moved swiftly. On 3 June 1857 there was a CMR shareholders' meeting which approved leasing the line to the LNWR for £5,500 per annum and a guaranteed dividend of 5%. The parliamentary bill for the line to the NSR at Colwich was withdrawn. The NSR had directors on the CMR board, and they now all resigned, and the LNWR takeover of control was complete; the necessary Act for extension of time was passed on 27 July 1857.

A new contractor T. R. Stephenson was appointed but he too was soon found wanting, and at the end of 1857 Thomas Brassey and Thomas Field were given the work. During the period of construction, an omnibus service was introduced, running from the LNWR at Rugeley to the SSR, newly opened at Cannock, and operated on behalf of the CMR.

There followed repeated erroneous predictions of when the line would be opened, culminating in a visit on 29 September 1959 by Colonel Yolland of the Board of Trade to pass the line for passenger operation; it was still deficient of requirements and he declined to do so. He made a re-inspection on 22 October, and found that things were better although a turntable had still not been provided at Rugeley. Despite this shortcoming, the Board of Trade permitted operation, and on 7 November 1859 the line opened. (Note: Christiansen says that Brassey completed the construction "5 months ahead of the original forecast" but this seems to be a misunderstanding.)

== Opening and operation ==
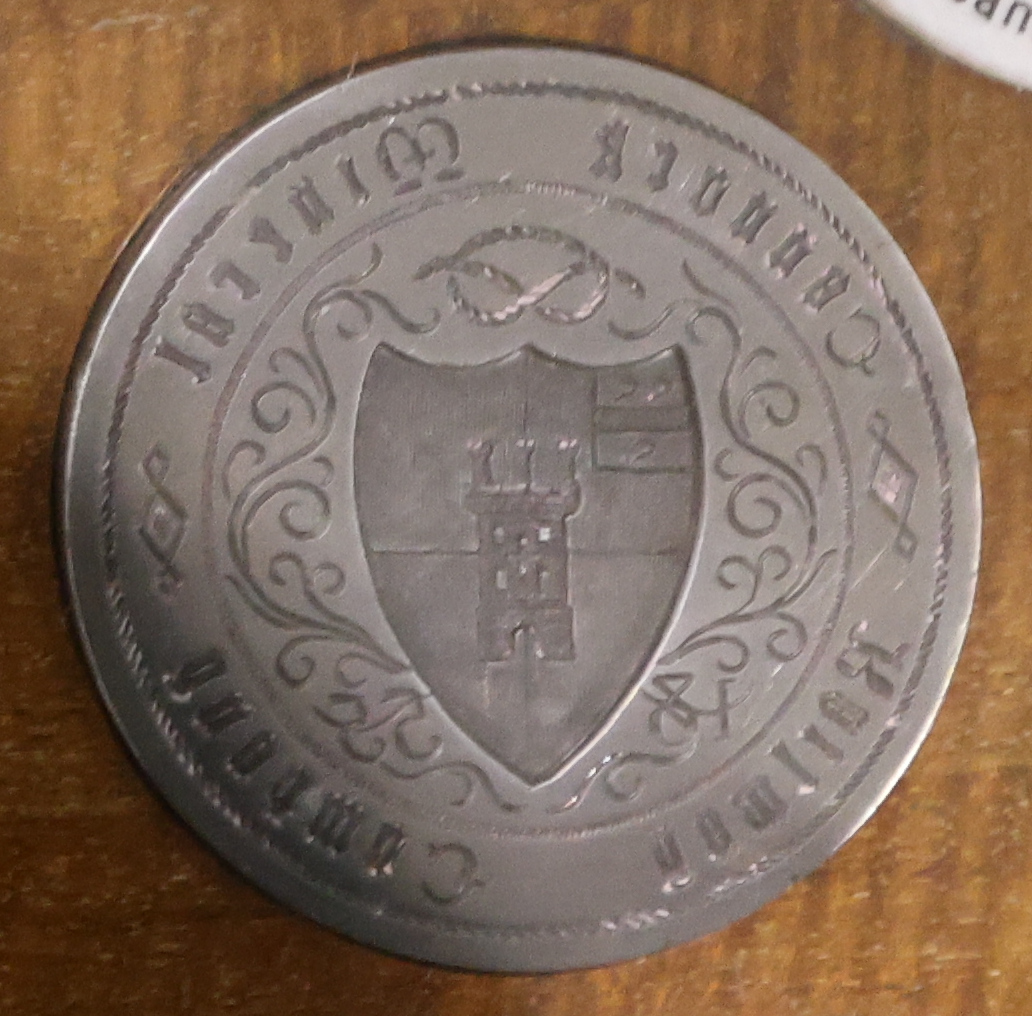
Cannock Mineral Railway company seal

The first passenger train service consisted of three daily trains between Birmingham and Stafford.

The 1895 edition of Bradshaw shows eight passenger trains each way daily at Cannock, with one additional on certain days of the week, and two on Sundays. In 1922 the service had risen to ten each way with three on Sundays, and by 1938 this had further risen to 23 weekdays and eight on Sundays.

The LNWR lease of the CMR was to run for a period of 999 years from its opening date, but Brassey suggested that the LNWR might prefer to acquire the CMR outright. The Directors announced on 28 February 1862 that this was to take place, but once again matters dragged on, and it was only on 12 July 1869 that Parliament authorised it. The share swap was £55 of Ordinary LNWR Stock or £70 of LNWR 5 per cent Perpetual Preference Stock to replace every £100 of CMR shares, with an alternative of £7 in cash for every £10 CMR share. The last Board Meeting of the CMR was held on 21 August 1869 at Euston.

== Locations ==
- Rugeley; LNWR station on main line; opened 15 September 1847; renamed Rugeley Trent Valley 1 June 1870; renamed Rugeley 6 May 1968; renamed Rugeley Trent Valley 11 May 1992;
- Rugeley Town; opened 1 June 1870; closed 18 January 1965; reopened 2 June 1997; still open;
- Brindley Heath; opened 3 and 17 August 1939 for Bank Holiday specials from an RAF station; opened to public 26 August 1939; closed 6 April 1959;
- Hednesford no 2 Junction; convergence of Cannock Chase Railways 1862 – 1973;
- Hednesford; opened 7 November 1859; closed 18 January 1965; reopened 10 April 1989; still open;
- East Cannock Junction; divergence of LNWR line to Norton Crossing, 1879 – 1964;
- Cannock; LNWR station; opened 1 February 1858; closed 18 January 1965; reopened 10 April 1989; still open.
