= Rugeley Trent Valley railway station =

Railway station in Staffordshire, England

Coordinates: 52.770°N 1.930°W

Rugeley Trent Valley
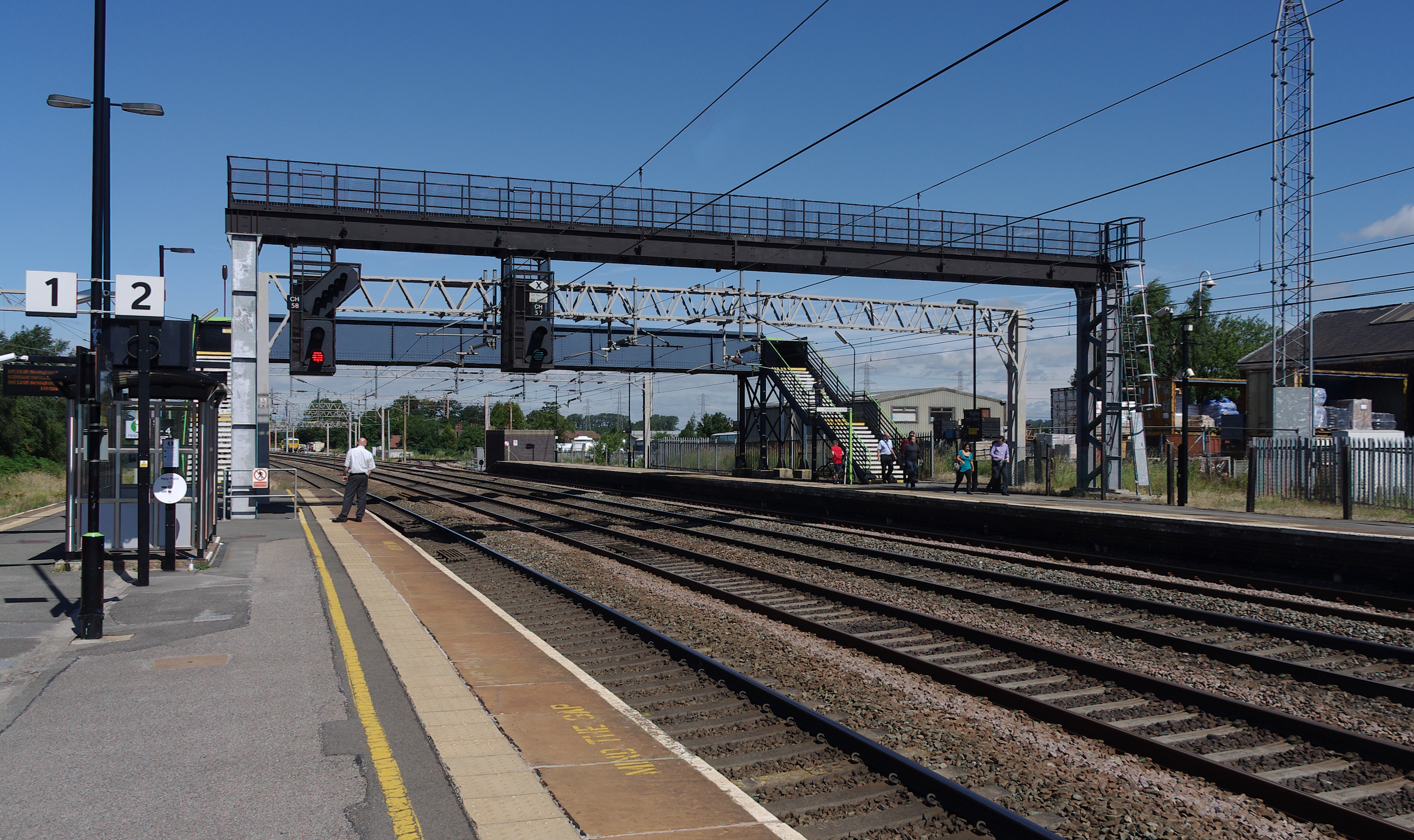
- The station in 2012, looking north.

General information
- Location: Colton, Lichfield District, England
- Grid reference: SK048191
- Manager: London Northwestern Railway
- Platforms: 3
- Tracks: 5

Other information
- Station code: RGL
- Classification: DfT category F1

History
- Opened: 15 September 1847

Passengers
- 2021/22: ▲0.148 million
- Interchange: ▲26,660
- 2022/23: ▲0.155 million
- Interchange: ▲37,174
- 2023/24: ▲0.169 million
- Interchange: ▲54,741
- 2024/25: ▲0.201 million
- Interchange: ▲65,040
- 2025/26: ▲0.220 million
- Interchange: ▲77,671
Location
Notes
- Passenger statistics from the Office of Rail and Road

Rugeley Trent Valley is a railway station serving both the village of Colton and the town of Rugeley, in Staffordshire, England. It is one of two stations serving the town, with the other being Rugeley Town. It is situated on the eastern side of the town, near the Rugeley Trent Valley Trading Estate, and is located close to the River Trent. West Midlands Trains operates the station and all trains serving it.

It is a minor station on the Trent Valley section of the West Coast Main Line. It is also the terminus of the Chase Line from Birmingham and Walsall.

== History ==
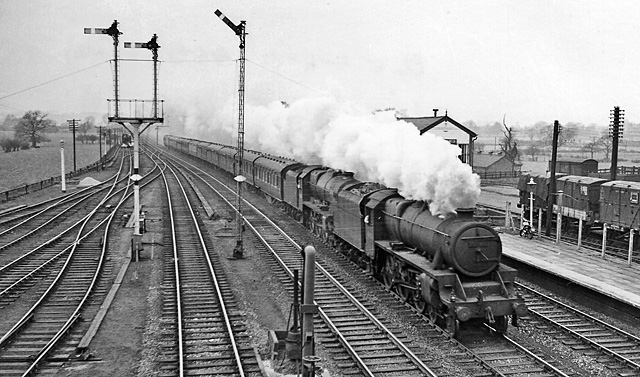
The station in 1958

The station opened in September 1847, coinciding with the line's opening. The line from Cannock was added by the Cannock Mineral Railway in 1859.

Services on the Chase Line were withdrawn in January 1965, as a result of the Beeching cuts, and reinstated on 25 May 1998 when the line was extended back into Rugeley Trent Valley from Birmingham New Street and Walsall.

From the mid-1960s until 1998, it was served only by local stopping trains between Stafford and either Rugby or (from 1987) Coventry – these were withdrawn in 2004 when work began to upgrade the main line to four tracks, with bus replacements operating until London Midland introduced the present semi-fast service between London Euston and Crewe via Stafford in 2008.

The station was the location of Queen Elizabeth II's naming of Class 67 locomotive No. 67029 Royal Diamond, marking her diamond wedding anniversary with Prince Philip, on 12 October 2007.

== Layout ==
Rugeley Trent Valley has three platforms: platform 3 is located at the main entrance, 1 and 2 are located on an island platform. Platform 1 is bi-directional, which is used for terminating services from Birmingham New Street, whereas platform 2 is used for northbound services to Crewe. Platform 3 is used for southbound services to London Euston. Between platforms 2 and 3, there are two fast lines for non-stop services.

Rugeley Trent Valley is unstaffed, but does have a ticket machine at the entrance as the penalty fare scheme operates here.

== Services ==
Rugeley Trent Valley is managed by West Midlands Trains, which operates all services calling at the station.

=== Chase Line ===
The station is served by trains operated by West Midlands Railway on the Chase Line from Birmingham New Street and Birmingham International.

In the May 2023 timetable, Rugeley Trent Valley is served by half-hourly services on the Chase Line calling at all local stations to Walsall followed by Tame Bridge Parkway and Birmingham New Street before calling at all local stations on its way to terminate at Birmingham International. On matchdays at Bescot Stadium and Villa Park services often make additional calls at Bescot Stadium, Aston and Witton. Services run hourly on Sundays.

From 2008 to 2019, these ran half-hourly during peak times and hourly during off-peak times on weekdays, half-hourly on Saturdays and hourly on Sundays. These services used to be extended to terminate at Stafford, but as of the December 2008 timetable changes, these services were all cut back to terminate at Rugeley Trent Valley.

The Chase Line saw a major timetable reorganisation in May 2019, coinciding with the completion of electrification. Services ran half-hourly throughout the day, and initially, trains alternated in terminating at Birmingham International and London Euston via Birmingham, Coventry, Northampton and Milton Keynes.

The service was simplified by 2021, with all Chase line services to and from Rugeley Trent Valley being West Midlands Railway services terminating at Birmingham New Street, calling at all stations north of and including Walsall, but only stopping at Tame Bridge Parkway south of there. The frequency remained at 2tph on Mondays to Saturdays, while on Sundays services ran hourly.

=== West Coast Main Line ===
London Northwestern Railway operates an hourly service northbound to Crewe via Stafford and southbound to Euston via Lichfield Trent Valley, Nuneaton and Rugby using the Trent Valley Line. Most services on this route run fast between Rugby and Milton Keynes Central with occasional stops at Northampton in the peak.

Inter-city Avanti West Coast services between London Euston and North West England do not call at Rugeley Trent Valley, due to the low passenger numbers compared to other Trent Valley stations; in addition, the short platforms do not accommodate the tilting Class 390 Pendolino or Class 805/807 Evero trains that are operated.

Preceding station	National Rail	Following station
Stafford towards Crewe	London Northwestern Railway London–Crewe	Lichfield Trent Valley towards London Euston
Terminus	West Midlands Railway; Rugeley - Walsall - Birmingham; Chase Line	Rugeley Town
Terminus	West Midlands Railway; Rugeley - Walsall - Birmingham - Wolverhampton; Limited service	Rugeley Town
