= South and Mid Staffordshire =

- Proposed unitary authority area
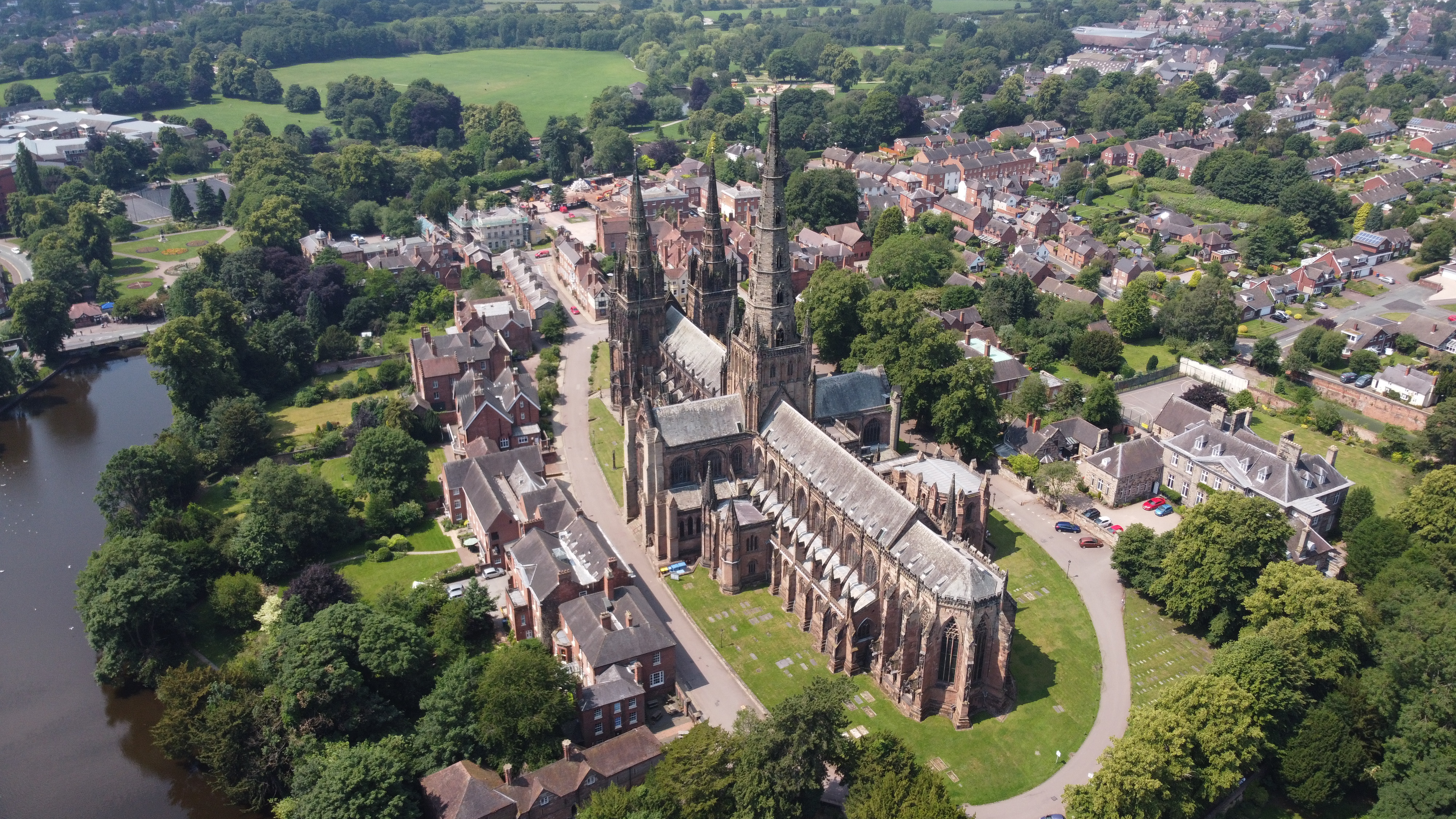
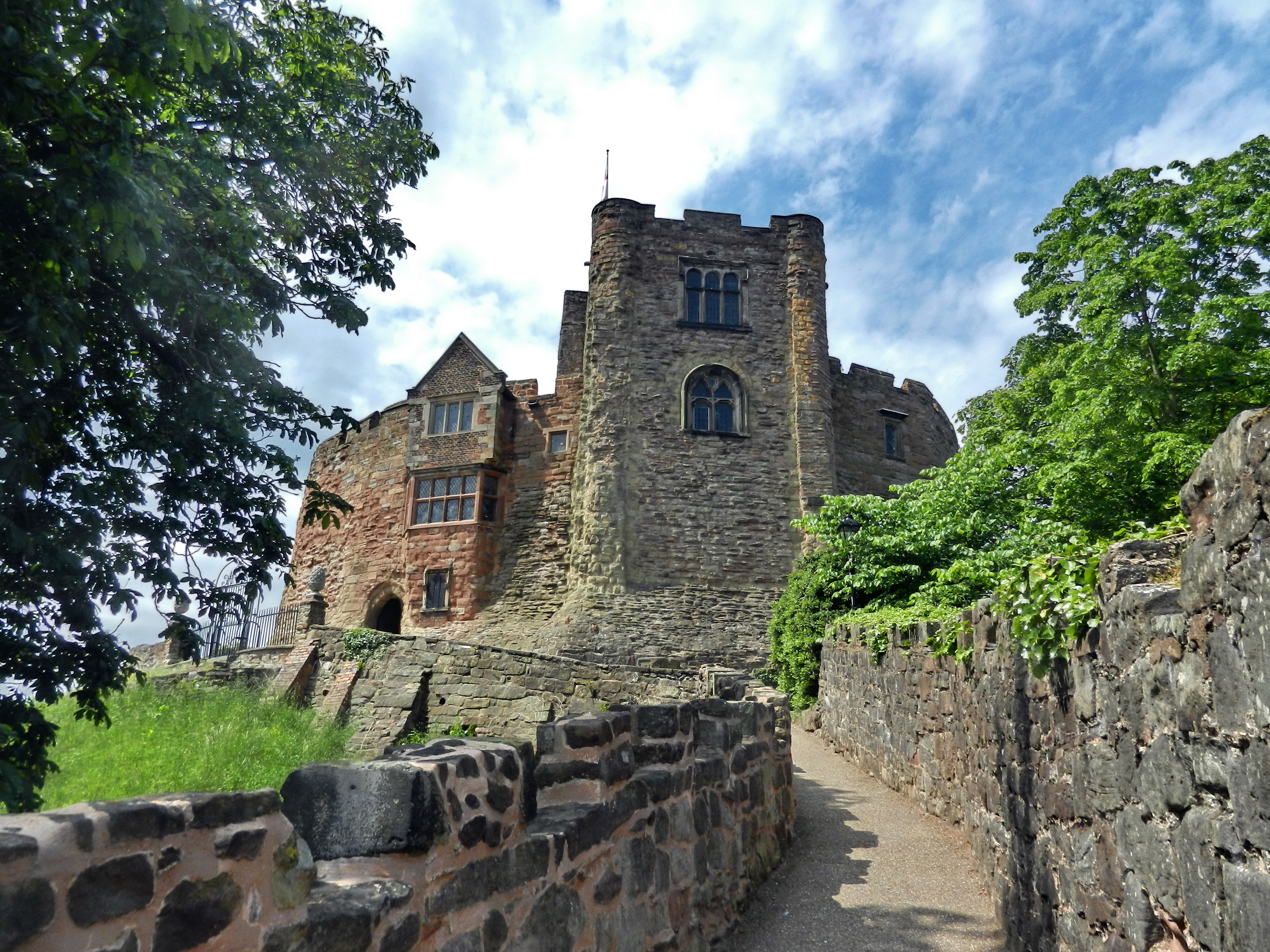
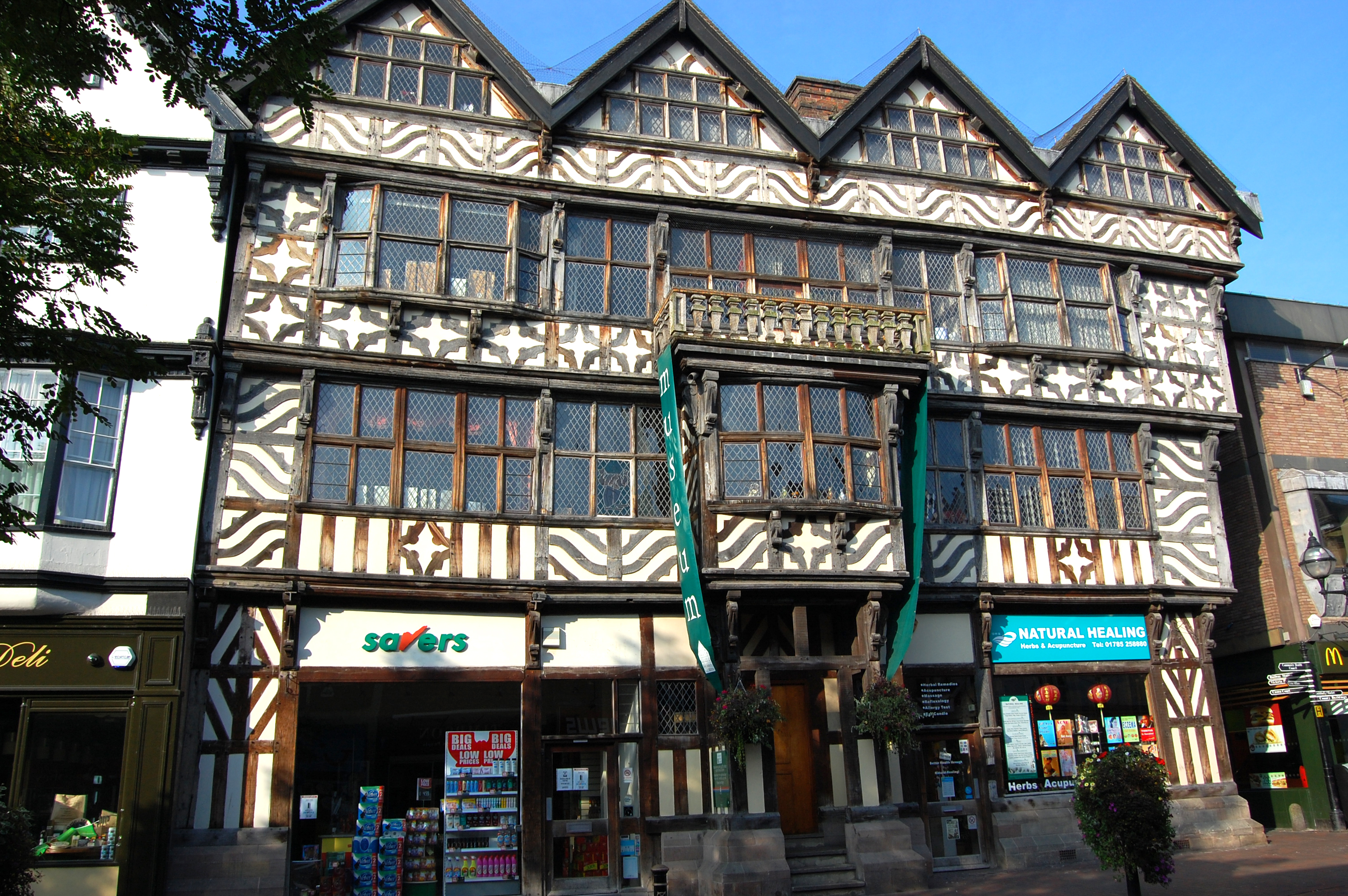
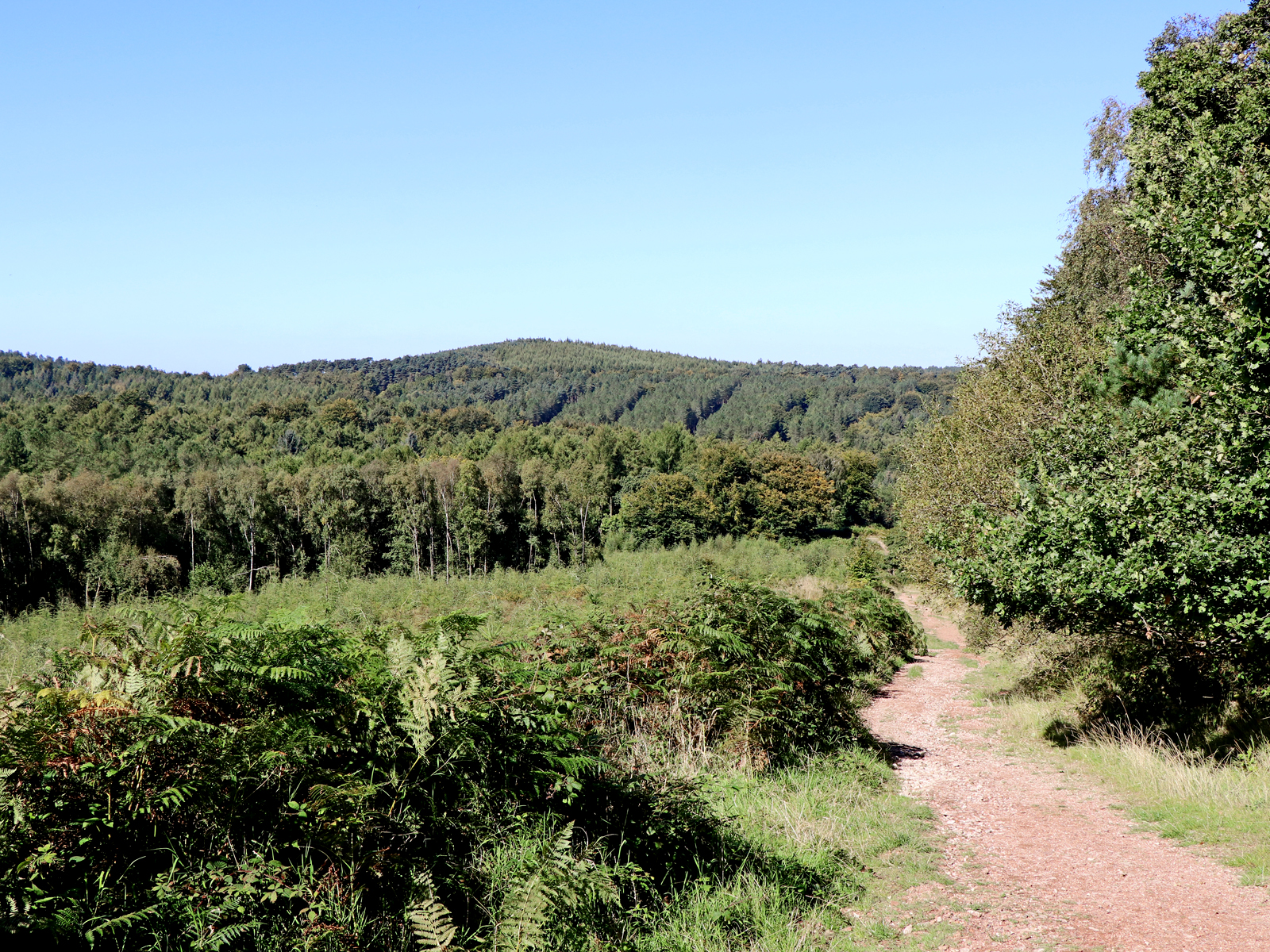
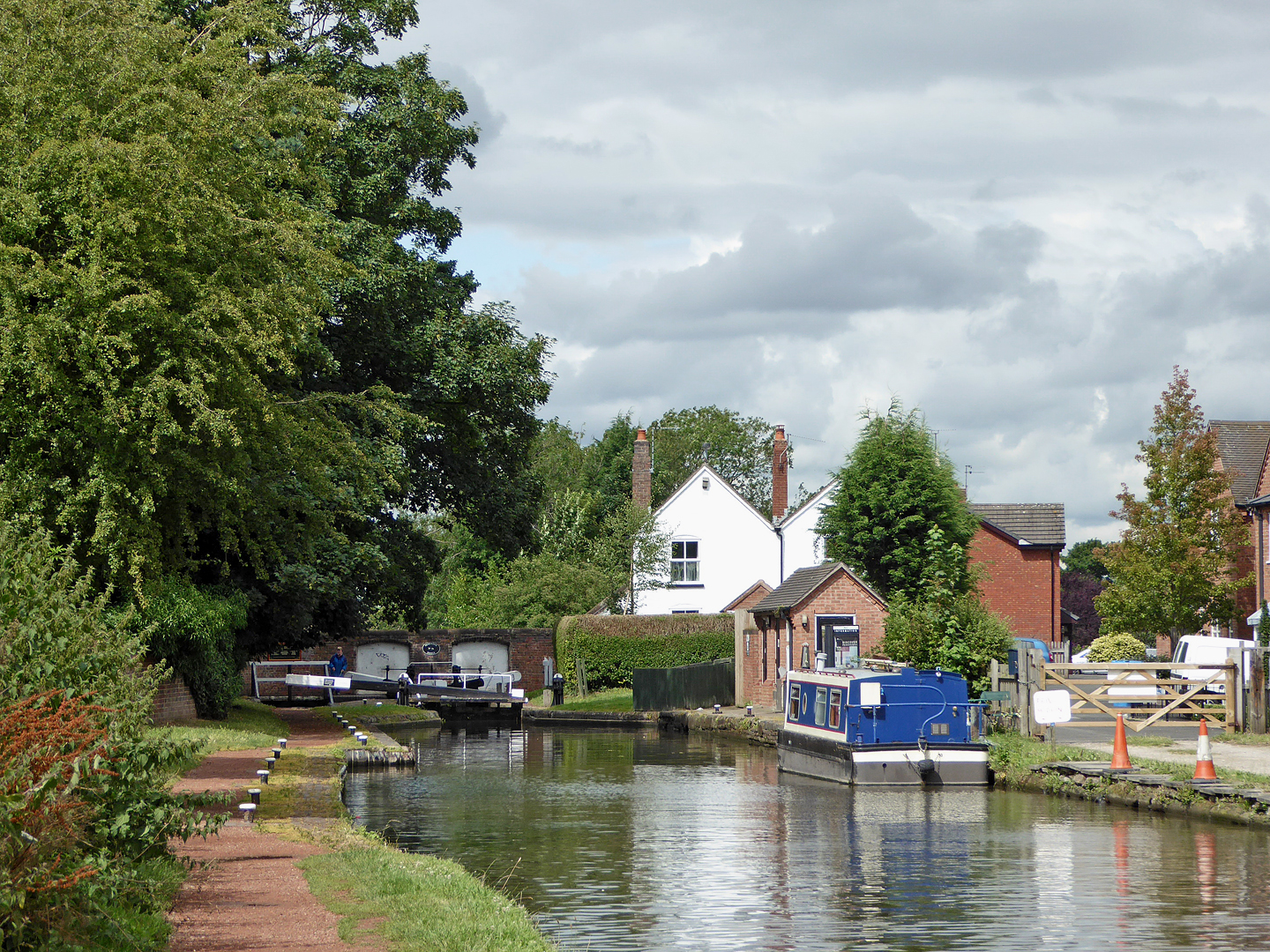
- Clockwise from top: Lichfield Cathedral; Ancient High House, Stafford; Staffordshire and Worcestershire Canal, Penkridge; Cannock Chase; and Tamworth Castle

- Interactive map
- Coordinates: 52.6330°N 1.6953°W
- Sovereign state: United Kingdom
- Country: England
- Region: West Midlands
- Ceremonial county: Staffordshire

Government
  - Type: Unitary authority
  - Body: South and Mid Staffordshire Council

Area
  - Total: 707.94 sq mi (1,833.55 km^{2})

Population (2024 estimate)
  - Total: 682,775
- Time zone: UTC+0 (GMT)
  - Summer (DST): UTC+1 (BST)

South and Mid Staffordshire or Southern and Mid-Staffordshire was a proposed unitary authority area in the ceremonial county of Staffordshire, England. It was planned to be formed on 1 April 2028, with elections planned to take place in May 2027. Its largest settlement would have been Tamworth and it was also to have included Burton upon Trent, Stafford, Lichfield, Cannock, Rugeley, Burntwood, Stone, Uttoxeter and Wombourne. The area has a 2024 estimated population of 682,775.

Plans to create it were halted in September 2026 and the first election was cancelled. In October 2026, the plans to create it were withdrawn.

== Formation ==
It was to be formed from the existing Staffordshire districts of Cannock Chase, East Staffordshire, Lichfield, South Staffordshire, Stafford and Tamworth. Cannock, Stafford, Tamworth and the Rawnsley area are currently unparished, the rest of the area is parished. Tamworth and Stafford are consulting on whether to form parishes (and thus town councils).

The district was being formed as part of ongoing local government changes throughout England, in which all areas of the country that have separate county councils and district councils will see those replaced with single-tier, or unitary, local governance. The two alternative proposals for two unitaries in Staffordshire and Stoke-on-Trent, and the proposals for three and four unitaries were not accepted, including Staffordshire County Council's preferred option of an east/west split. The northern part of the county was to form a new North Staffordshire authority.

In September 2026, the Staffordshire proposals were halted by the government and placed under review. In October 2026, plans to create it were withdrawn. The decision was threatened with judicial review by Newcastle-under-Lyme Borough Council.

== Governance ==
It was to be run by South and Mid Staffordshire Council, which was to have comprised 92 councillors.
