= Listed buildings in Heath Hayes and Wimblebury =

Heath Hayes and Wimblebury is a civil parish in the district of Cannock Chase, Staffordshire, England. The parish contains two listed buildings that are recorded in the National Heritage List for England. Both the listed buildings are designated at Grade II, the lowest of the three grades, which is applied to "buildings of national importance and special interest". The parish is to the east of Cannock, and contains the former villages of Heath Hayes and Wimblebury, which have grown and merged. The parish is mainly residential, and the listed buildings consist of a house and a farmhouse now used for other purposes.

== Buildings ==
Name and location	Photograph	Date	Notes
Prospect Place; 52.69905°N 1.99909°W	—	18th century	The house was altered and refronted in about 1810. It is in painted brick, and has a hipped slate roof. There are two storeys and five bays, and the windows are sashes. On the front is a Doric portico, and a doorway with a moulded surround, pilasters, a rectangular fanlight, a frieze, and consoles.
New Hall Farmhouse; 52.68708°N 2.00213°W		Late 18th century	The farmhouse, later used for other purposes, is in red brick with quoins and a hipped tile roof. There are two storeys and an attic, and four bays. The doorway has a round head and a segmental fanlight, the windows are casements with cambered heads, and on the right side is a bay window.
