= Wedges Mills =

Coordinates: 52.6751°N 2.0535°W

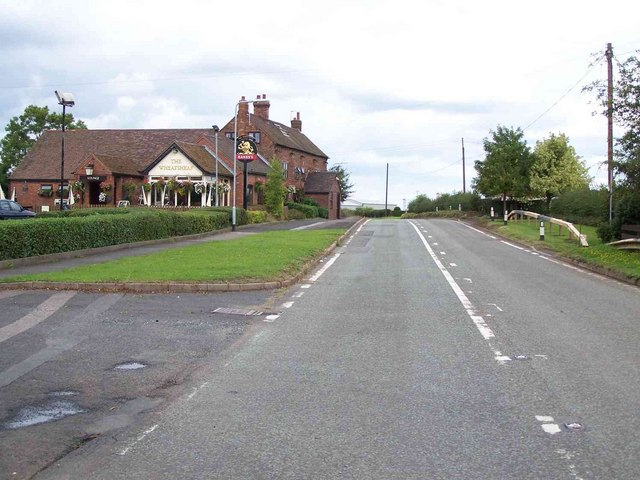
The Wheatsheaf, Wedges Mills

Wedges Mills is a small village in the South Staffordshire District in Staffordshire, England, close to the border with Cannock Chase District. The area is located on the A4601 between Cannock and Featherstone. The area is mainly residential and has a large industrial estate. It is also located quite close to the M6 Toll. The area is part of the Bridgtown parish area. Select Bus service 67 connects the area with Cannock and Wolverhampton via Shareshill and Featherstone, operating three through journeys plus an additional journey between Wedge Mills and Cannock only.
