= Cannock Chase Radio =

Radio station in Staffordshire, England

Cannock Chase Radio Nationwide
- Cannock; England
- Broadcast area: Cannock Chase District
- Frequency: Online/ Sky TV

Programming
- Format: Community Radio

Ownership
- Owner: Andrew Raymond Buck

History
- First air date: 15 November 2014
- Last air date: 4 November 2026

Links
- Website: https://cannockchaseradio.co.uk/

Cannock Chase Radio was a community radio station, broadcasting to Cannock Chase District in Staffordshire, England. The station's tagline is "The Greatest Hits and So Much More!" and it has been broadcasting online since 15 November 2014 from studios in Bridgtown, Cannock.

Cannock Chase Radio launched on FM on 30 March 2018 with 89.6 MHz being used in Rugeley and 94.0 MHz in Cannock. The station started broadcasting on 89.8 MHz in November 2020 to Burntwood, Lichfield and Brownhills.

Cannock Chase Radio No longer broadcast's on FM.

The Station was dissolved by HMRC on November 4th 2026 ending a dream & Truly Local Radio for Cannock Chase.

== History ==
Cannock Chase Radio was created by Robyn, Jane, and James Hughes, who felt that the area needed a radio station of its own. Many radio stations cover the area, but they felt that the Cannock Chase District was overlooked in terms of radio. Therefore, the trio decided to launch a radio station dedicated exclusively to the area.

During September and October 2014, premises were found in Kingston Court Cannock, opposite the Electric Palace Cinema. The station has since moved to premises in Bridgtown, Cannock.

In April of 2023, Cannock Radio Ltd was sold by the Hughes Family to Andrew Raymond Buck for an undisclosed sum due to Robyn Hughes having personal health issues.

In 2026 it was confirmed that the Current ownership had vacated it's premises in Bridgtown, Cannock (without notice) to move to a home studio style format thus ending the three FM frequencies in the process. Accounts have are currently overdue to HMRC which is a sad state of affairs for a once successful business.

== Presenters ==
Presenters change from time to time; current presenters are listed on the Cannock Chase Radio web site.

== Availability ==
Cannock Chase Radio can be heard online, on TuneIn, on Alexa and on the stations own IOS and Android Apps.
