= North Staffordshire =

North Staffordshire may refer to:

- the north of Staffordshire
  - Federation of Stoke-on-Trent (Burslem, Tunstall, Stoke-upon-Trent, Hanley, Fenton and Longton)
  - Staffordshire Potteries (Burslem, Fenton, Hanley, Longton, Tunstall and Stoke)
- the future North Staffordshire (district) and unitary authority area
- North Staffordshire (UK Parliament constituency)
