= Hawks Green =

Village and ward in Staffordshire, England

Coordinates: 52°41′35″N 1°59′56″W

- Village
- Location within Staffordshire
- Shire county: Staffordshire
- Region: West Midlands
- Country: England
- Sovereign state: United Kingdom
- Police: Staffordshire
- Fire: Staffordshire
- Ambulance: West Midlands

Hawks Green (Also known as Hayes Green) is a suburban village and ward in Cannock Chase, Staffordshire. Located between Cannock and Heath Hayes, the area is predominantly residential with a large superstore, fuel station, pub and community centre. The village borders Stoney Lea, Heath Hayes and Church Hill. There is a regular bus connecting the village to Cannock.
