= Church Hill, Staffordshire =

Suburban village in Staffordshire, England

Coordinates: 52.706°N 1.993°W

Church Hill
- Location within the United Kingdom
- Shire county: Staffordshire
- Country: England
- Sovereign state: United Kingdom

Church Hill is a suburban village in the Cannock Chase district, in the county of Staffordshire, England. The village is located east of Hednesford and south of Rugeley. The village has a church dedicated to St. Peters and is located adjacent to the areas of Rawnsley, Littleworth and Hazelslade. The area is also located near the Hednesford Hills Nature Reserve. The nearest railway station is in Hednesford.
