= 2026 Cannock Chase District Council election =

2026 English local government election

- 7 May 2026

13 out of 36 seats to Cannock Chase District Council (including 1 by-election) 19 seats needed for a majority
	First party	Second party
Leader		Steve Thornley defeated
Party	Reform	Labour
Last election	0 seats, 3.5%	21 seats, 44.6%
Seats before	2	18
Seats won	13	0
Seats after	14	10
Seat change	▲12	▼8
Popular vote	16,454	4,157
Percentage	53.6%	13.5%
Swing	▲50.1%	▼31.1%
	Third party	Fourth party
Leader	Olivia Lyons	Andrea Muckley
Party	Conservative	Green
Last election	10 seats, 32.6%	5 seats, 16.8%
Seats before	10	5 (Note: Including the vacant seat in Hednesford Hills & Rawnsley last held by a Green.)
Seats won	0	0
Seats after	8	3
Seat change	▼2	▼2
Popular vote	5,190	4,726
Percentage	16.9%	15.4%
Swing	▼15.7%	▼1.4%
- Winner of each seat at the 2026 Cannock Chase District Council election.
Leader before election
Steve Thornley
Labour
Leader after election
Paul Jones
Reform
No overall control (Note: Reform minority.)

The 2026 Cannock Chase District Council election took place on 7 May 2026 to elect members of Cannock Chase District Council in Staffordshire, England. There were 13 of the 36 seats on the council up for election, being the usual third of the council plus a by-election. This was on the same day as other local elections.

Prior to the election, the council was under Labour majority control. At the election, Reform UK won all of the seats being contested, becoming the largest party of the council. They fell five seats short of an overall majority, leaving the council under no overall control. The incumbent Labour leader of the council, Steve Thornley, lost his seat. After the election, Reform chose Paul Jones to be its new group leader. He was formally appointed as the new leader of the council at the subsequent annual council meeting on 20 May 2026, leading a Reform minority administration.

== Summary ==
=== Council composition ===
After 2024 election		Before 2026 election	
Party	Seats	Party	Seats
Labour	21	Labour	19
Conservative	10	Conservative	10
Green	5	Green	4
Reform	0	Reform	2
Vacant	N/A	Vacant	1

Changes 2024–2026:

- March 2025: Josh Newbury (Labour) resigns – by-election held May 2025
- May 2025:
  - Samantha Thompson (Conservative) gains by-election from Labour
  - Fred Prestwood (Labour) dies – by-election held August 2025
- August 2025: Paul Jones (Reform) gains by-election from Labour
- October 2025: Richard Craddock (Conservative) joins Reform
- November 2025: Hayley Page (Green) resigns – seat left vacant until 2026 election

=== Election result ===
2026 Cannock Chase District Council election
Party	This election				Full council			This election		
Party	Candidates	Seats	Net	Seats %	Other	Total	Total %	Votes	Votes %	+/−
Reform	{{{candidates}}}	13	▲12	100.0	1	14	40.0	16,454	53.6	+50.1
Labour	{{{candidates}}}	0	▼8	0.0	10	10	28.6	4,157	13.5	–31.1
Conservative	{{{candidates}}}	0	▼2	0.0	8	8	22.9	5,190	16.9	–15.7
Green	{{{candidates}}}	0	▼2	0.0	3	3	8.6	4,726	15.4	–1.4
Independent	{{{candidates}}}	0	Steady	0.0	0	0	0.0	167	0.5	–1.7
TUSC	{{{candidates}}}	0	Steady	0.0	0	0	0.0	23	0.1	–0.2

== Incumbents ==
Ward	Incumbent councillor	Party	Re-standing
Brereton & Ravenhill	David Williams	Labour Co-op	
Cannock Longford & Bridgtown	Richard Craddock (Note: Originally elected as a Conservative, but later defected to Reform.)	Reform	
Cannock Park & Old Fallow	Steve Thornley	Labour	
Chadsmoor	Sue Thornley	Labour	
Etching Hill & The Heath	Justin Johnson	Conservative	
Hawks Green with Rumer Hill	Les Bullock	Labour	
Heath Hayes & Wimblebury	Diane Todd	Labour	
Hednesford Green Heath	Garry Samuels	Labour	
Hednesford Hills & Rawnsley	Hayley Page	Green	
Hednesford Pye Green	Sheila Cartwright	Labour	
Norton Canes	Jean Hill	Labour	
Western Springs	George Hughes	Conservative	

== Ward results ==
Sitting councillors standing for re-election are marked with an asterisk (*).

=== Brereton & Ravenhill ===
Brereton & Ravenhill
Party	Candidate	Votes	%	±%
Reform	Michael Sheppard	1,111	51.3	N/A
Labour Co-op	Dave Williams*	500	23.1	–27.0
Conservative	Keeren Hart	288	13.3	–3.3
Green	Ian Pyke	268	12.4	+3.7
Majority		611	28.2	N/A
Turnout		2,167	33.1	+9.7
Registered electors		~6,547		
Reform gain from Labour Co-op				

=== Cannock Longford & Bridgtown ===
Cannock Longford & Bridgtown
Party	Candidate	Votes	%	±%
Reform	Richard Craddock*	1,378	53.2	N/A
Conservative	Doug Smith	441	17.0	–22.9
Labour	Denise Elizabeth	400	15.5	–29.9
Green	Eloise Cropp	346	13.4	–1.4
TUSC	Gareth Knox	23	0.9	N/A
Majority		937	36.2	N/A
Turnout		2,588	37.3	+11.9
Registered electors		~6,938		
Reform hold				

=== Cannock Park & Old Fallow ===
Cannock Park & Old Fallow
Party	Candidate	Votes	%	±%
Reform	Mandy Bell	1,467	54.5	+34.4
Conservative	Paris Theodorou	594	22.1	–14.9
Labour	Steve Thornley*	349	13.0	–19.2
Green	Simon Cocker	282	10.5	–0.3
Majority		873	32.4	N/A
Turnout		2,692	41.5	+14.0
Registered electors		~6,487		
Reform gain from Labour		Swing	▲24.7	

=== Chadsmoor ===
Chadsmoor
Party	Candidate	Votes	%	±%
Reform	Alex Hunt	1,494	61.0	+39.2
Labour	Sue Thornley*	357	14.6	–33.4
Green	Emma Osborne	310	12.7	+1.2
Conservative	Phil Jones	288	11.8	–7.0
Majority		1,137	46.4	N/A
Turnout		2,449	34.2	+12.4
Registered electors		~7,161		
Reform gain from Labour		Swing	▲36.3	

=== Etching Hill & The Heath ===
Etching Hill & The Heath
Party	Candidate	Votes	%	±%
Reform	Steven Deakin	1,181	45.6	N/A
Conservative	Justin Johnson*	755	29.2	–11.9
Labour Co-op	Darren Foley	359	13.9	–22.4
Green	Diane Phizacklea	294	11.4	+3.3
Majority		426	16.4	N/A
Turnout		2,589	37.7	+11.1
Registered electors		~6,867		
Reform gain from Conservative				

=== Hawks Green with Rumer Hill ===
Hawks Green with Rumer Hill
Party	Candidate	Votes	%	±%
Reform	Melissa Cecil	1,178	50.1	+30.8
Conservative	Phil Hewitt	611	26.0	–7.5
Green	Kevin Elson	293	12.5	+3.3
Labour	Leslie Bullock*	271	11.5	–17.1
Majority		567	24.1	N/A
Turnout		2,353	39.5	+14.1
Registered electors		~5,957		
Reform gain from Labour		Swing	▲19.2	

=== Heath Hayes & Wimblebury ===
Heath Hayes & Wimblebury
Party	Candidate	Votes	%	±%
Reform	Daniel Cecil	1,468	59.0	+39.6
Conservative	Helen Young	388	15.6	–15.7
Labour	Diane Todd*	355	14.3	–26.7
Green	Ian Wallace	276	11.1	+2.8
Majority		1,080	43.4	N/A
Turnout		2,487	37.4	+12.6
Registered electors		~6,650		
Reform gain from Labour		Swing	▲27.7	

=== Hednesford Green Heath ===
Hednesford Green Heath
Party	Candidate	Votes	%	±%
Reform	Mark Deakin	1,092	53.1	+33.4
Green	David Green	336	16.4	+6.2
Conservative	Laura Harrison	310	15.1	–10.4
Labour	Garry Samuels*	269	13.1	–28.0
Independent	Ron Turville	48	2.3	–1.2
Majority		756	36.7	N/A
Turnout		2,055	33.6	+11.0
Registered electors		~6,116		
Reform gain from Labour		Swing	▲13.6	

=== Hednesford Hills & Rawnsley ===
Hednesford Hills & Rawnsley
Party	Candidate	Votes	%	±%
Reform	Rhys Mandry	1,293	49.1	N/A
Green	Rachel Rock	837	31.8	–21.4
Conservative	Ron Sutton	350	13.3	–9.6
Labour	Alan Pearson	154	5.8	–13.0
Majority		456	17.3	N/A
Turnout		2,634	43.4	+15.4
Registered electors		~6,069		
Reform gain from Green				

=== Hednesford Pye Green ===
Hednesford Pye Green (2 seats due to by-election)
Party	Candidate	Votes	%	±%
Reform	Robert Branson	1,165	56.1	N/A
Reform	Graham Millington	1,152	55.5	N/A
Green	Angela Rushton	511	24.6	–17.4
Green	Cameron Rushton	487	23.5	–17.7
Conservative	Hyra Sutton	262	12.6	–8.1
Labour	Sheila Cartwright*	245	11.8	–28.8
Labour	Paula Stanton	212	10.2	–29.3
Independent	Sharon Jagger	119	5.7	N/A
Turnout		~2,077	37.0	+11.7
Registered electors		~5,614		
Reform gain from Labour				
Reform gain from Green				

=== Norton Canes ===
Norton Canes
Party	Candidate	Votes	%	±%
Reform	Georgina Jeffrey	1,515	59.6	N/A
Labour	Jean Hill*	406	16.0	–48.2
Conservative	Wendy Yates	386	15.2	–8.4
Green	Linda Mawle	236	9.3	+2.9
Majority		1,109	43.6	N/A
Turnout		2,543	37.5	+15.0
Registered electors		~6,781		
Reform gain from Labour				

=== Western Springs ===
Western Springs
Party	Candidate	Votes	%	±%
Reform	John Parkes	960	47.8	N/A
Conservative	Joshua Birch	517	25.8	–15.8
Labour	Daniel Foceac	280	14.0	–24.1
Green	Leah Adams	250	12.5	–7.8
Majority		443	22.0	N/A
Turnout		2,007	38.8	+10.7
Registered electors		~5,173		
Reform gain from Conservative				
