= Rawnsley, Staffordshire =

Area of Cannock Chase District, Staffordshire, England

Coordinates: 52.7064°N 1.9731°W

Rawnsley
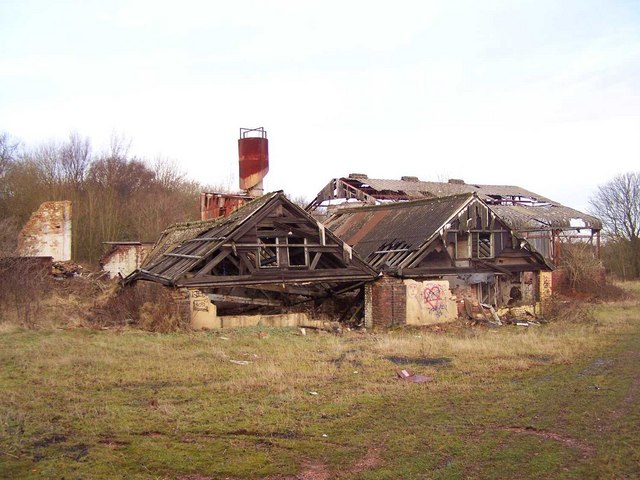
- Ruins of the Rawnsley Iron Foundry

- Location within Staffordshire
- District: Cannock Chase
- Shire county: Staffordshire
- Region: West Midlands
- Country: England
- Sovereign state: United Kingdom
- Police: Staffordshire
- Fire: Staffordshire
- Ambulance: West Midlands

Rawnsley is an area in the Cannock Chase district, in the county of Staffordshire, England. It is located between Hazelslade and Prospect Village. Rawnsley is a former mining hamlet and was served by the mineral line from Hednesford to Burntwood which carried minerals to the mines around the area. There are traces of the former line near modern-day Rawnsley, mostly on Littleworth Road.

== Transportation ==
The area is served by the 62 Lichfield–Cannock bus route.
