= Walter Colman =

English Franciscan friar

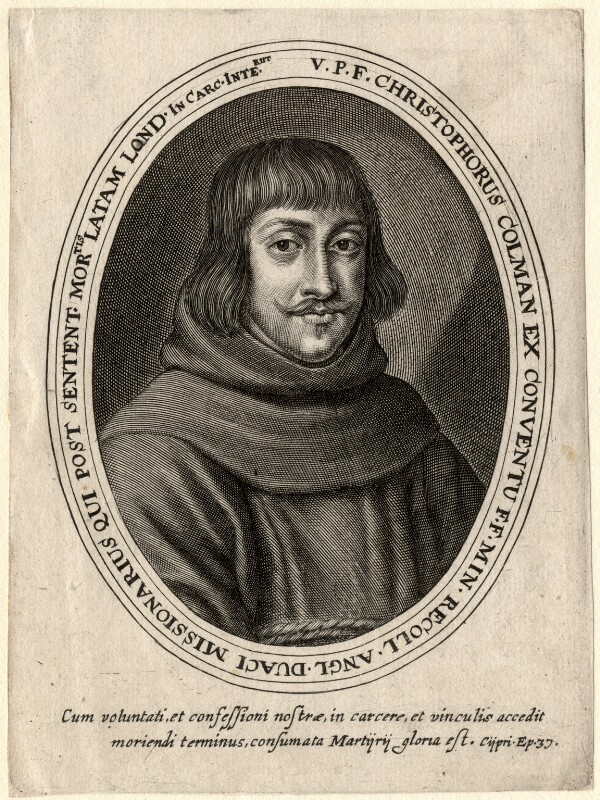
- Born: 1600; Cannock
- Died: 1645 (aged 44–45); Newgate Prison
- Occupation: Friar

Walter Colman (1600 – 1645) was an English Franciscan friar.

== Life ==
Colman was born in Cannock, Staffordshire, to a noble and wealthy family. His father was also named Walter Coleman. His mother's family, the Whitgreaves, later gave asylum to Charles II in 1651 at Mosley Hall near Wolverhampton.

Young Colman left England to study at the English College, Douai. In 1625 he entered the Franciscan Order at Douai, receiving in religion the name of Christopher of St. Clare, by which he is more generally known.

Having completed his year of novitiate, he returned to England at the call of provincial superior Father John Jennings, but was immediately imprisoned because he refused to take the Oath of Allegiance. Released through the efforts of his friends, Colman went to London, where he was employed in the duties of the ministry and where, during his leisure moments, he composed La dance machabre, or, Death's Duel (London, 1632 or 1633), an elegant metrical treatise on death, which he dedicated to Queen Henrietta Maria, consort of Charles I. Around 1631, Colman commissioned that work to be printed to the London stationer Roger Michell. In his publishing house, the words "Death's Duell" from the title were, without Colman's permission, used as the title of funeral sermon of the famous poet and preacher John Donne who died at the same time (the stationer Michell also passed away before he could print Colman's book). Therefore, infuriated Colman added to the text of his "Death's Duell", printed at William Stansby's publishing house, short poem in which he informed the readers of the sad violation of author's rights and described Michell's untimely death as a just punishment for his deed.

When religious persecution broke out anew in 1641, Colman returned to England from Douai, where he had gone to regain his health. On 8 December of the same year he was brought to trial, together with six other priests, two of whom were Benedictines, the other four were members of the secular clergy. They were all condemned to be hanged, drawn, and quartered on 13 December, but through the interposition of the French ambassador the execution was stayed indefinitely. Colman lingered on in Newgate Prison for several years until 1645, when he died, exhausted by starvation and the rigours of his confinement.

== Notes ==
Attribution

- cites:
  - Thaddeus, The Franciscans in England (London, 1898), 62, 72, 106
  - Anne Hope, Franciscan Martyrs in England (London, 1878), xi, 123 sqq
  - Mason, Certamen Seraphicum (Quaracchi, 1885), 211, 228
  - Leo, Lives of the Saints and Blessed of the Three Orders of St. Francis (Taunton, 1887), IV, 368.
