= Bobby Hosker =

English footballer

Personal information
- Full name: Robert Charles Hosker
- Date of birth: 27 February 1955 (age 71)
- Place of birth: Cannock, Staffordshire, England
- Height: 5 ft 5 in (1.65 m)
- Position: Winger

Youth career
- 1970–1972: Middlesbrough

Senior career*
Years	Team	Apps	(Gls)
1972–1974	Middlesbrough	0	(0)
1974–1977	York City	25	(1)
1977–1978	Boston United	35	(8)
1978–1988	Racing Jet de Bruxelles	243	(10)
Total		303	(19)
- * Club domestic league appearances and goals

Robert Charles Hosker (born 27 February 1955) is an English former professional footballer who played as a winger in the Football League for York City, in non-League football for Boston United and was on the books of Middlesbrough without making a league appearance. After Boston he go to Belgium and play by Racing Jet de Bruxelles in Division one (68/3), Division two and three, and stop after fusion in 1988.
