= Harry Kinsell =

English footballer (1921–2000)

Personal information
- Full name: Thomas Henry Kinsell
- Date of birth: 3 May 1921
- Place of birth: Cannock, Staffordshire, England
- Date of death: 14 August 2000 (aged 79)
- Place of death: Dudley, England
- Position: Full back

Youth career
- 1935–1938: West Bromwich Albion
- 1935–1936: → Hednesford Town (loan)

Senior career*
Years	Team	Apps	(Gls)
1938–1949	West Bromwich Albion	83	(0)
1949–1950	Bolton Wanderers	17	(0)
1950–1951	Reading	12	(0)
1951–1955	West Ham United	101	(2)
1956–?	Bedford Town		
Total		213	(2)
- * Club domestic league appearances and goals

Thomas Henry "Harry" Kinsell (3 May 1921 – 14 August 2000) was an English footballer who played as a full back for West Bromwich Albion, Bolton Wanderers, Reading, West Ham United and Bedford Town.

== Playing career ==
Kinsell was born in Cannock, Staffordshire. He began playing football at local and regional schoolboy level in Staffordshire in the early 1930s. West Bromwich Albion signed him as a 14-year-old on an amateur basis on 31 May 1935. Still aged 14 he made his debut, on loan, for Hednesford Town at the end of the 1935–36 season in a 3–1 defeat away at Stourbridge. He continued to play in the youth teams for West Bromwich Albion for the next two seasons before signing a professional contract on 1 June 1938.

=== War-time football ===
On 3 September 1939, the outbreak of the Second World War cut-short Kinsell's professional career. During the war Kinsell played as a guest player for Mansfield, Middlesbrough, Southend United and Grimsby Town. He also played for Blackpool against Aston Villa in the 1944 League North Cup Final where they lost 4–5 on aggregate. Kinsell also gained international honours with England in two victory games against Northern Ireland in September and Wales in October 1945 as well as playing for the FA Services XI against Switzerland, the Army, Combined Services and Western Command, making a total of 67 wartime appearances.

=== After World War Two ===
Kinsell had to wait until the end of World War II to make his Albion debut. He started in the FA Cup for West Brom on 5 January 1946 against Cardiff City and made his league debut in a 3–2 defeat away at Swansea Town on 31 August 1946. Kinsell was a member of the 1948–49 Second Division promotion-winning side. He made 158 appearances for West Bromwich Albion before being sold to Bolton Wanderers on 1 June 1949, for what was then a club record transfer fee of £12,000. He moved to Reading on 1 May 1950 and to West Ham United on 1 January 1951, for a fee of £5,250 making his debut on 13 January 1951 in a 3–2 home defeat to Blackburn Rovers. He scored his only two career goals for West Ham against Birmingham City and Everton, in 101 appearances over five seasons. In May 1956, Kinsell moved to Bedford Town.

== After football ==
After retirement from football Kinsell ran the Alma Arms pub in Stratford, London before returning to live in Brierley Hill until his death in Dudley, West Midlands on 14 August 2000.
