= Heath Hayes and Wimblebury =

Civil parish in Staffordshire, England

Coordinates: 52.696°N 1.979°W

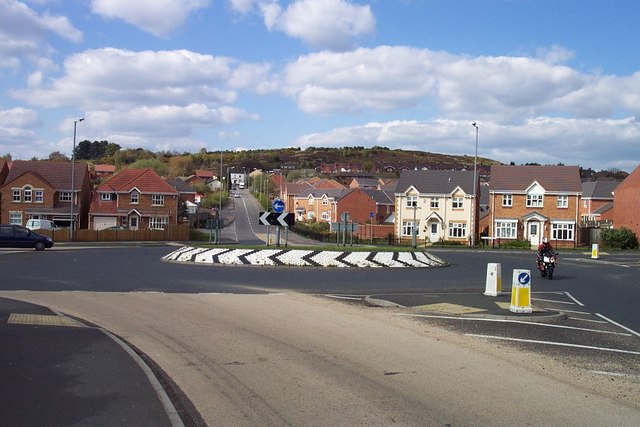
- Wimblebury looking north on John Street

- Location within Staffordshire
- Population: 14,085 (2011 Census)
- District: Cannock Chase
- Shire county: Staffordshire
- Region: West Midlands
- Country: England
- Sovereign state: United Kingdom
- Post town: CANNOCK
- Postcode district: WS12
- Dialling code: 01543
- Police: Staffordshire
- Fire: Staffordshire
- Ambulance: West Midlands
- UK Parliament: Cannock Chase

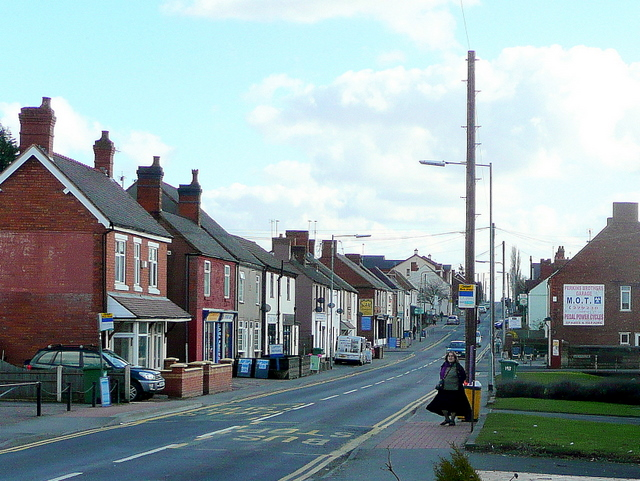
Hednesford Road, Heath Hayes

Heath Hayes and Wimblebury is a civil parish in the Cannock Chase District of Staffordshire, England. It comprises the once separate villages of Heath Hayes and Wimblebury, which has seen housing developments physically merging them into one settlement.

Cannock and Hednesford railway stations are nearby. The parish has also seen the opening of the Designer Outlet West Midlands and it sits directly next to Cannock Chase “Natural Landscape” (previously referred to as areas of outstanding natural beauty, AONB).

The population of the parish in 2011 was 14,085 and its area is 389.56 hectares (1.5041 sq mi).

The parish is surrounded on three sides by plenty of green belt and notably the Old Brickworks Nature Reserve, the Hednesford Hills Nature Reserve (which is an area of Special Scientific Interest), Wimblebury Mound (known locally as Cannel Mount) and Bleak House Farm, with the village bordering the Cannock Chase Area of Outstanding Natural Beauty (AONB).

There are a number of schools in the area and a wide range of leisure and retail facilities. The parish is close to the A5 and M6 Toll roads. It is served by Cannock and Hednesford railway stations and also has bus connections to the towns.

== Demographics ==
At the 2011 United Kingdom census the population of the parish was 14,085, living in 5,423 household spaces.

In the decade to 2011 the number of dwellings rose by 17.4% to 5,515. Of the parish's 5,515 households in the 2011 census, 21.4% were one-person households including 6.3% where that person was 65 or over. 74.6% were one family with no others (4.7% all pensioners, 46.6% married or same-sex civil partnership couples, 14.8% cohabiting couples and 8.6% lone parents). 38.7% of households had dependent children including 2.8% with no adults in employment. 76.7% of households owned their homes outright or with a mortgage or loan.

Of the parish's 11,079 residents in the 2011 census aged 16 and over, 31.9% were single (never married), 52.5% married, 0.15% in a registered same-sex civil partnership, 2.4% separated, 8.3% divorced and 4.7% widowed. 19.2% had no formal qualifications and 57.6% had level 2+ qualifications (meaning 5+ GCSEs (grades A*-C) or 1+ 'A' levels/ AS levels (A-E) or equivalent minimum).

85.0% of the 5,232 men aged 16 to 74 were economically active, including 58.7% working full-time, 4.6% working part-time and 15.2% self-employed. The male unemployment rate (of those economically active) was 4.7%. 75.1% of the 5,294 women aged 16 to 74 were economically active, including 37.6% working full-time, 26.8% working part-time and 4.3% self-employed. The female unemployment rate (of those economically active) was 3.7%.

Of people in employment aged 16 to 74, 13.8% worked in basic industries (ONS categories A, B, and D-F including 12.1% in construction), 12.8% in manufacturing, and 73.3% in service industries (ONS categories G-U including 18.5% in wholesale and retail trade and vehicle repair, 11.7% in health and social work, 8.6% in education, 6.5% in public administration, 5.6% in transport and storage, 4.0% in accommodation and catering, 4.0% in professional, scientific and technical activities, and 3.8% in administrative and support service activities). Only 10.8% of households did not have access to a car or van, and 85.6% of people in employment travelled to work by car or van.

85.6% of residents described their health as good or very good. The proportion who described themselves as White British was 96.3%, with all white ethnic groups making up 97.4% of the population. The ethnic make-up of the rest of the population was 0.87% mixed/multiple ethnic groups, 0.65% Indian/Pakistani/Bangladeshi, 0.24% Chinese, 0.31% other Asian, 0.36% Black and 0.16% other. 2.5% of the parish's residents were born outside the United Kingdom.

The responses to the voluntary question "What is your religion?" were 'No religion' (22.8%), Christian (69.8%), Buddhist (0.22%), Hindu (0.10%), Jewish (0%), Muslim (0.18%), Sikh (0.35%), and other religion (0.35%). 6.1% gave no answer.

== Notable people ==
- Mel Galley (1948 in Cannock – 2008 in Heath Hayes and Wimblebury) an English guitarist and singer, best known for his work with Whitesnake, Trapeze, Finders Keepers and Phenomena.

== See also ==
- Listed buildings in Heath Hayes and Wimblebury
