= Cannock =

Market town in Staffordshire, England

Coordinates: 52.691°N 2.027°W

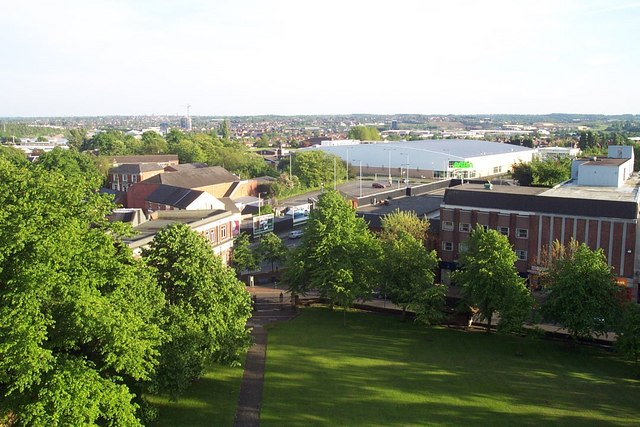
- Cannock from top of St. Luke's Church Tower

- Location within Staffordshire
- Area: 9.24 km^{2} (3.57 sq mi)
- Population: 100,523 (2021 Census)
  - Density: 10,879/km^{2} (28,180/sq mi)
- Demonym: Cannocker, Cannockonian, Cannockian
- OS grid reference: SJ980101
- District: Cannock Chase
- Shire county: Staffordshire
- Region: West Midlands
- Country: England
- Sovereign state: United Kingdom
- Areas of the town (2011 census BUASD): List: Bridgtown; Broomhill; Chadsmoor; Hawks Green; Heath Hayes; Littleworth; Oldfallow; Rawnsley; Rumer Hill; Stoney Lea; Wimblebury
- Post town: CANNOCK
- Postcode district: WS11
- Dialling code: 01543
- Police: Staffordshire
- Fire: Staffordshire
- Ambulance: West Midlands
- UK Parliament: Cannock Chase

Cannock (/ˈkænək/) is a town in the Cannock Chase district in the county Staffordshire, England. It had a population of 29,018. Cannock is not far from the towns Walsall, Burntwood, Stafford and Telford. The cities Lichfield and Wolverhampton are also nearby.

Cannock lies to the north of the West Midlands conurbation on the M6, A34 and A5 roads and to the south of Hednesford and the Cannock Chase Area of Outstanding Natural Beauty. Cannock is served by a railway station on the Chase Line. The town comprises four district council electoral wards and the Cannock South ward includes the civil parish of Bridgtown, but the rest of Cannock is unparished.

== History ==
Cannock was in the Domesday Book of 1086. It was called Chnoc c.1130, Cnot in 1156, Canot in 1157, and Canoc in 1198. Cannock is probably Old English cnocc meaning 'hillock', modified by Norman pronunciation by the insertion of a vowel to Canoc. The name may refer to Shoal Hill, north-west of the town.

Cannock was a small rural community until mining increased heavily during the mid-to-late 19th century. The area then continued to grow rapidly with many industries coming to the area because of its proximity to the Black Country and its coal reserves. Cannock's population continued to increase steadily in the 20th century and its slight fall since the 1981 census has been more than compensated for by house-building in the adjoining village of Heath Hayes. The last colliery to close in the town was Mid Cannock in 1967, and the last remaining colliery to close in the Cannock Chase area was Littleton (in Huntington) in 1993.

The total population of the built-up area defined in 2011 was 86,121, making it the second largest in Staffordshire if Swadlincote in Derbyshire is excluded from the Burton upon Trent Built-up Area (BUA). There is some green belt, particularly between the Cannock BUA and the much larger West Midlands BUA to the south. As well as the Lichfield, Stafford, East Staffordshire, and South Staffordshire Districts.

A house known as The Green, which dated from the 1730s and which was the home of Sir Robert Fisher, 4th Baronet, became the headquarters of Cannock Urban District Council in 1927. It was converted into offices in the 1980s, initially for Cannock Chase Technical College but, in 2016, it was refurbished for private use.

Cannock Chase German war cemetery is located nearby containing 4,885 German military dead from the First and Second World Wars. It is managed by the Commonwealth War Graves Commission.

== Geography ==
Cannock is on a south-west facing slope, falling from the highest point on Cannock Chase (244 m) at Castle Ring, to about 148 m in the town centre and 111 m near Wedges Mills. The soil is light with a gravel and clay subsoil, and there are extensive coal measures.

=== Climate ===
Cannock has a moderate, temperate climate. See Penkridge weather station for details of average temperature and rainfall figures taken between 1981 and 2010 at the Met Office weather station in Penkridge (around 5 miles (8 km) north-west of Cannock).

=== Location ===
Cannock is about 20 miles (30 km) by road north-north-west of Birmingham, 80 miles (130 km) south-south-east of Manchester and 130 miles (210 km) north-west of London. It is 9 to 10 miles (14 to 16 km) by road from many of the nearest towns and cities (Aldridge, Lichfield, Stafford, Walsall, Willenhall and Wolverhampton), but Hednesford (2 miles (3 km)), Burntwood and Penkridge (5 miles (8 km)), Bloxwich and Brownhills (6 miles (10 km)) and Rugeley (7 miles (11 km)) are nearer.

== Demography ==
In the decade to 2011 the number of dwellings rose by 7.8% to 13,152. The ward with the biggest increase (16.1%) was Cannock South. Of the town's 12,690 households in the 2011 census, 31.5% were one-person households including 13.9% where that person was 65 or over. 63.6% were one family with no others (9.0% all pensioners, 30.9% married or same-sex civil partnership couples, 12.3% cohabiting couples and 11.3% lone parents). 27.7% of households had dependent children including 5.5% with no adults in employment. 59.3% of households owned their homes outright or with a mortgage or loan.

Of the town's 23,717 residents in the 2011 census aged 16 and over, 33.5% were single (never married), 45.2% married, 0.15% in a registered same-sex civil partnership, 2.6% separated, 10.4% divorced and 8.2% widowed. 33.4% had no formal qualifications and 42.9% had level 2+ qualifications, meaning 5+ GCSEs (grades A*-C) or 1+ 'A' levels/ AS levels (A-E) or equivalent minimum.

72.7% of the 10,509 men aged 16 to 74 were economically active, including 45.1% working full-time, 5.6% working part-time and 12.6% self-employed. The male unemployment rate (Male unemployment)(of those economically active) was 9.9%. 60.7% of the 10,724 women aged 16 to 74 were economically active, including 26.8% working full-time, 23.5% working part-time and 3.1% self-employed. The female unemployment rate (of those economically active) was 7.5%.

Of people in employment aged 16 to 74, 13.5% worked in basic industries (ONS categories A, B, and D-F including 11.1% in construction), 14.2% in manufacturing, and 72.2% in service industries (ONS categories G-U including 19.5% in wholesale and retail trade and vehicle repair, 11.6% in health and social work, 7.4% in education, 6.2% in transport and storage, 5.8% in public administration, 5.6% in accommodation and catering, and 4.7% in administrative and support service activities). While 27.7% of households did not have access to a car or van, 76.1% of people in employment travelled to work by car or van.

75.5% of residents described their health as good or very good. The proportion who described themselves as White British was 95.6%, with all white ethnic groups making up 97.4% of the population. The ethnic make-up of the rest of the population was 1.0% mixed/multiple ethnic groups, 0.69% Indian/Pakistani/Bangladeshi, 0.34% Chinese, 0.17% other Asian, 0.35% Black and 0.065% other. 3.1% of Cannock's residents were born outside the United Kingdom.

=== Built-up area subdivisions ===
Cannock Built-up Area
Subdivision	Population		Area (km^{2})	Settlements that cover the subdivision	
Subdivision	(2001 census)	(2011 census)	Area (km^{2})	In Cannock Chase District	In South Staffordshire District
Cannock	65,022	67,768	17.855	Cannock, Hazelslade, Heath Hayes and Wimblebury, Hednesford, Rawnsley.	Huntington, Wedges Mills.
Great Wyrley	18,775	18,353		–	Cheslyn Hay, Great Wyrley.
TOTAL	83,797	86,121	21.93		

== Media ==
=== Newspapers ===
Cannock had a free weekly local newspaper, the Cannock & Rugeley Chronicle (an edition of the Cannock & Lichfield Chronicle). It ceased as a physical publication in October 2018 although it is still available as a paid-for subscription via the Express & Star website (see below)

Another free weekly, the Chase Post (an edition of the Cannock Chase & Burntwood Post), ceased publication in November 2011.

The Express & Star is a paid-for local newspaper, published in Wolverhampton on weekdays.

=== TV ===
Regional TV news is provided by BBC West Midlands and ITV Central. Television signals can be received from either the Sutton Coldfield or The Wrekin TV transmitters.

=== Radio ===
Cannock is served by the national radio stations, and West Midlands "regional" licences Greatest Hits Radio Birmingham & The West Midlands, Smooth West Midlands, Heart West Midlands and Capital Midlands. The town is also covered by Hits Radio Black Country & Shropshire on 97.2 and BBC Radio WM on 95.6 FM.

Cannock is served by its own community radio station, called Cannock Chase Radio FM, based in Wynns Venture Centre.The FM frequencies are 94fm for the Cannock and Hednesford area. 89.6 for Rugeley and Trent Valley and 89.8 For Lichfield and beyond. People can also listen back on their digital streaming devices.

== Transport ==
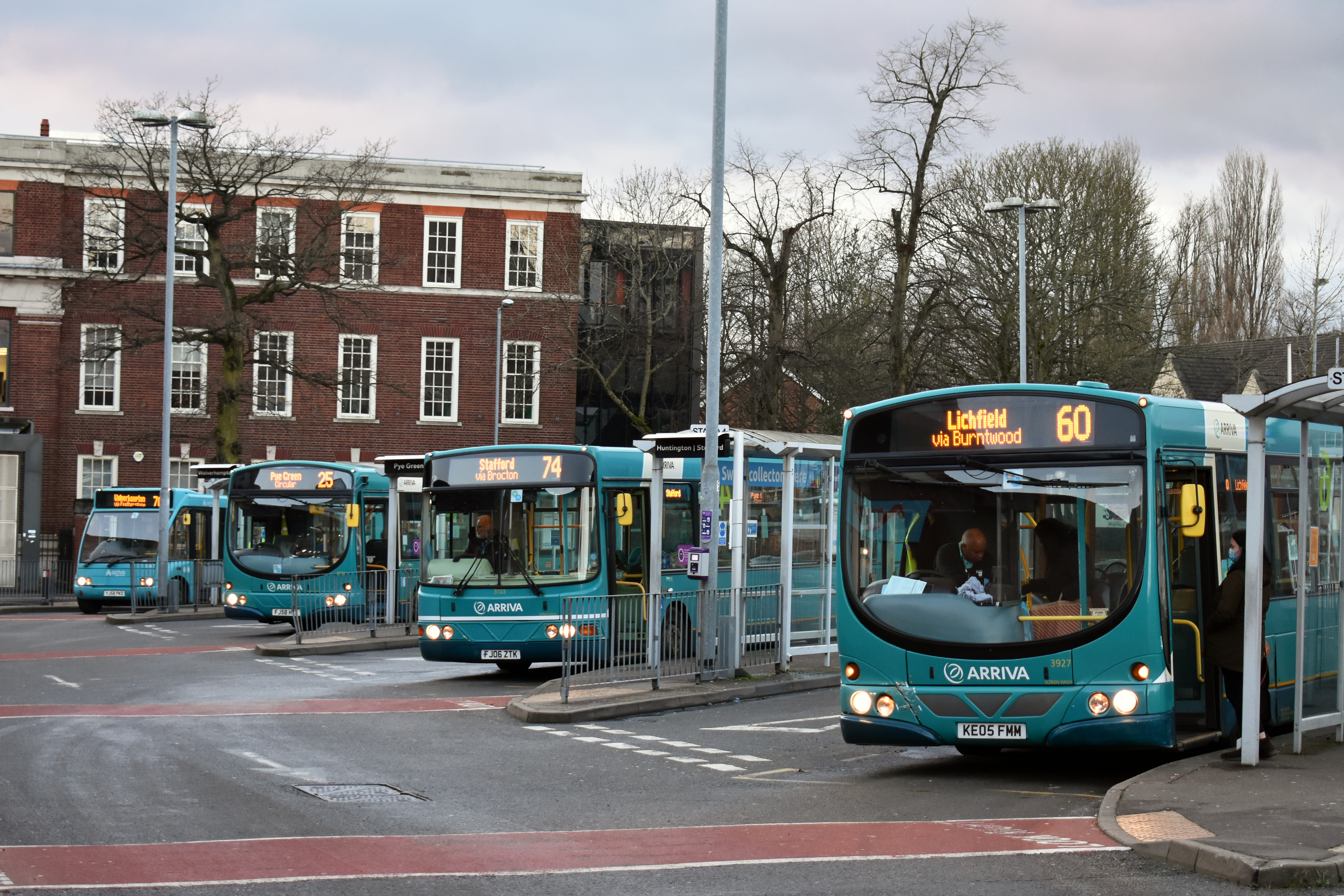
Arriva Midlands buses at Cannock Bus Station in December 2020

Cannock is located close to the M6, M6 Toll and M54 motorways. The main A roads are the A5 (east-west) and A34 (north-south).

=== Rail ===
Cannock railway station closed in 1965 as part of the Beeching cuts but reopened in 1989. It is part of the Chase Line operated by West Midlands Trains. Over the years, usage of this station, and the line overall, have increased to unprecedented levels. Services initially were hourly services between Birmingham New Street and Stafford (cut back to Rugeley Trent Valley in 2008). By 2013, usage had become significant enough to warrant the electrification of the railway line, which was completed in 2019.

The Chase Line, operated by West Midlands Trains, serves the three railway stations in the conurbation. These are at Hednesford, Cannock, and Landywood. There was also a service to Stafford on the line, but this was cut back to Rugeley due to congestion on the West Coast Main Line.

In May 2019, West Midlands Trains began operating electric trains from this station. The vast majority of services are to Rugeley Trent Valley in the north, southbound trains operate to Birmingham International and London Euston. The journey time to Birmingham is around 36 minutes. On Sundays, trains operate as far south as Coventry.

=== Bus ===
D&G Bus operate the majority of bus services around Cannock from a depot at Delta Way under the Chaserider brand.

Arriva Midlands were previously the main operator around Cannock but their operations based at their Cannock depot were sold to D&G Bus during 2020.

Select Bus Services also operate a small number of services while West Midlands Bus service X51 links Cannock with Birmingham via Walsall and Great Wyrley.

With county council funding, a small number of services operate Monday to Saturday evenings, Sundays and bank holidays. These include 60, 74 and X51. Additionally, the 25/26 circulars also run into the evening.

Cannock Bus Station also has links to Hednesford, Rugeley, Stafford, Lichfield, Wolverhampton, Walsall, Brownhills in addition to smaller towns and villages like Great Wyrley, Chadsmoor and Norton Canes.

== Education ==
Cannock Chase High School is a non-denominational mixed comprehensive with just over 1000 pupils aged 11–18.

Cardinal Griffin Catholic College is a voluntary aided Roman Catholic secondary school with around 950 pupils aged 11–18.

Chase Grammar School (called Lyncroft House School 1980–1996 then Chase Academy until January 2013) was an independent co-educational boarding school with a day nursery that operated up until September 2025.

South Staffordshire College closed its Cannock Campus in July 2017, but reopened it the following summer as the new Cannock Chase Skills and Innovation Hub with courses starting there from September 2018.

== Notable people ==
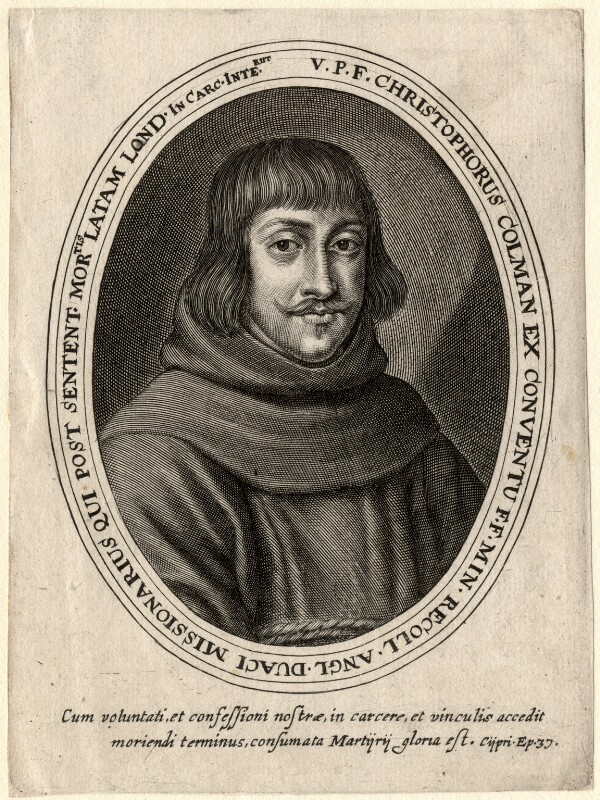
Walter Colman, 1649

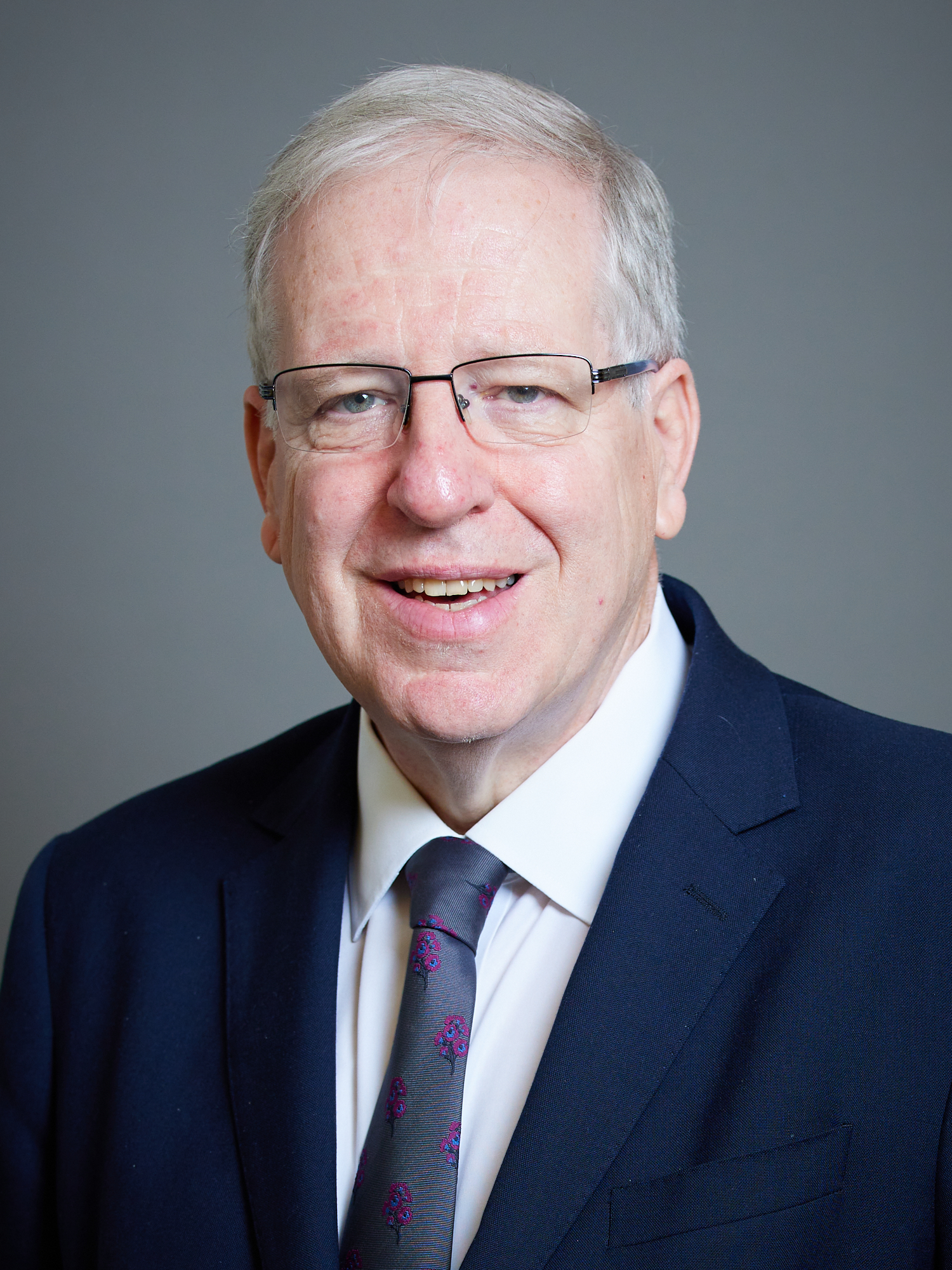
Sir Patrick McLoughlin, 2017

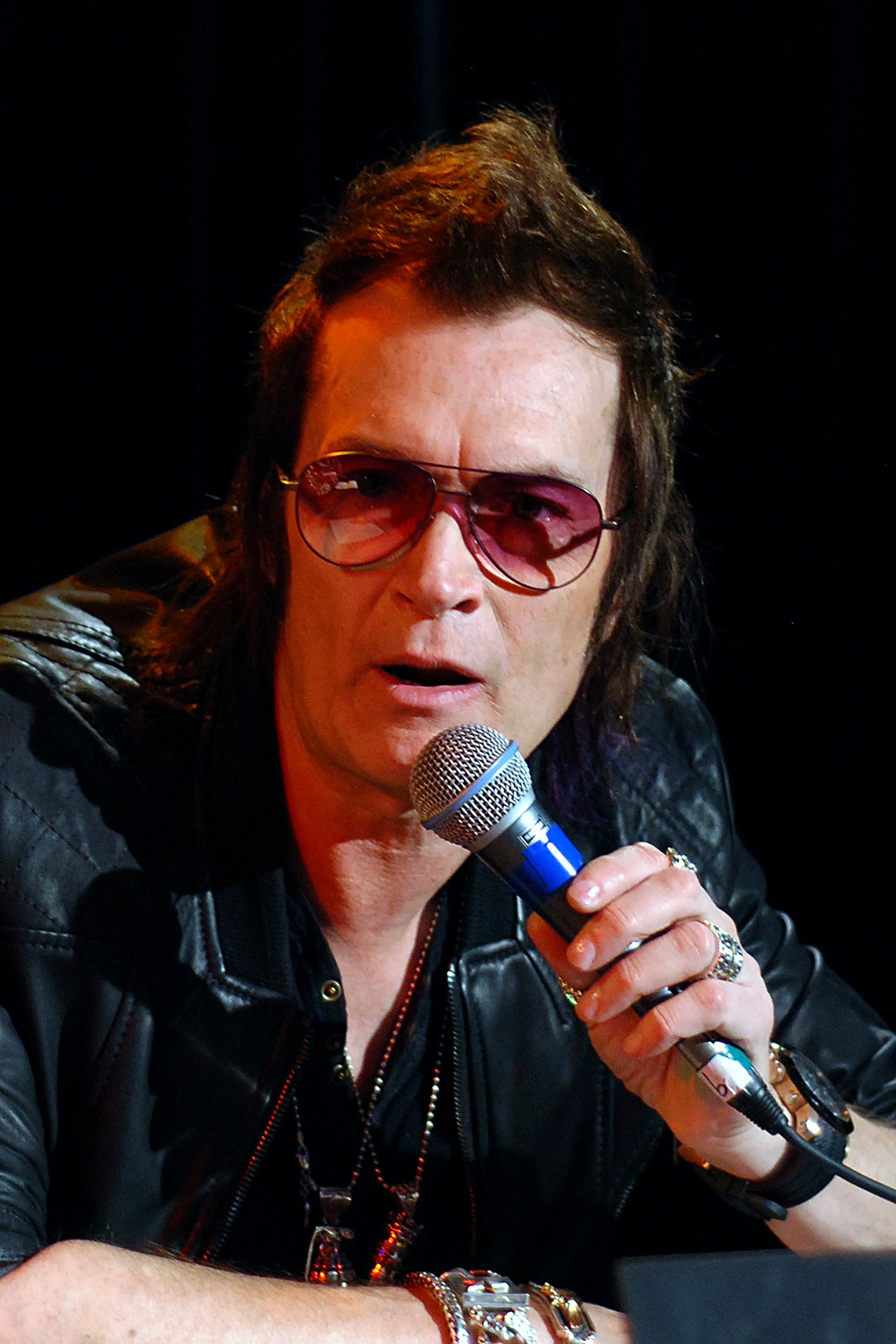
Glenn Hughes, 2012

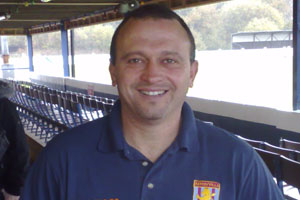
Dave Norton, 2007

=== Public service ===
- Walter Colman (1600 in Cannock – 1645) a Franciscan friar.
- Henry Sacheverell (1674–1724) High Church Anglican clergyman, Rector of Cannock and polemical preacher.
- Frank Edward Tylecote (1879 in Cannock – 1965), physician, Professor of Medicine at Manchester University, and early researcher into link between smoking and lung cancer
- Vernon Rylands Parton (1897 in Cannock – 1974), prolific inventor of chess variants, including Alice Chess
- Jennie Lee (1904–1988), MP for Cannock 1945–1970, Minister in the Department of Education and Science and the driving force for the creation of the Open University
- Raymond Furnell (1936–2006), curate of Cannock 1965–69 and the Dean of York 1994-2003
- Bill Skitt (1941 – 2016), a distinguished British police officer.
- Sir Patrick McLoughlin (born 1957) a Conservative politician, MP for the Derbyshire Dales, went to school in Cannock
- Richard Davies (born 1959), a doctor in the Falklands and New Zealand.

=== The Arts ===
- Arthur Hopcraft (1932–2004) author, reporter & TV scriptwriter, wrote perceptively of his upbringing in Cannock
- Elgar Howarth (1935–2025) an English conductor, composer and trumpeter
- Mel Galley (1948 in Cannock – 2008) former Whitesnake guitarist and songwriter
- Glenn Hughes (born 1951 in Cannock) former bassist/vocalist with Deep Purple
- Carole Ashby (born 1955 in Cannock) an English actress and former pin-up girl
- Robert Lloyd (born 1959 in Cannock) the lead singer with The Nightingales and formerly with The Prefects
- Jed Mercurio (born 1966) a British television writer, producer, director and novelist; brought up in Cannock
- Steve Edge (born 1972 in Cannock) an English actor, writer and former comedian
- Balaam and the Angel a Scottish rock band founded in Cannock in 1984
- Chris Overton (born 1988 in Cannock) an English actor and filmmaker
- Daniel Hewitt (born 1988) Journalist and Broadcaster

=== Sport ===
- Alec Talbot (1902 in Cannock – 1975) footballer, 260 caps mainly for Aston Villa F.C.
- Tom Galley (1915 in Cannock - 2000) footballer, over 200 caps mainly for Wolverhampton Wanderers F.C.
- Harry Kinsell (1921 in Cannock – 2000) footballer, over 200 caps mostly for West Brom and West Ham
- Gordon Lee (born 1934 in Cannock - 2022), footballer and football manager
- Malcolm Beard (born 1942 in Cannock), footballer with 350 caps, mostly for Birmingham City F.C.
- Jim Rhodes (1946 in Cannock – 2015) professional golfer
- Paul Cooper (born 1953 in Cannock) football goalkeeper, over 500 caps mostly for Ipswich Town,
- Geoff Palmer (born 1954 in Cannock), footballer, over 460 caps, mostly for Wolves
- Bobby Hosker (born 1955 in Cannock) footballer, over 300 pro appearances
- Vernon Allatt (born 1959 in Cannock) footballer, over 250 pro appearances
- Steve James (born 1961 in Cannock) former professional snooker player
- Dave Norton (born 1965 in Cannock), footballer, over 430 pro appearances
- Mick Gosling (born 1972), winner of Britain's Strongest Man contest in 2005
- Richard Gosling (born 1974 ) winner of Britain's Strongest Man contest in 2003
- Kevin Pietersen (born 1980), South African-born English cricketer, played for Cannock Cricket Club in 2000
- Andy Bishop (born 1982 in Cannock), footballer, over 450 pro appearances
- Kris Taylor (born 1984 in Cannock), footballer, over 340 pro appearances
- Riley Parsons (born 2000 in Cannock), professional snooker player
- Lewis Askey (born 2001), professional cyclist

== Twin town ==
Cannock is twinned with:

- Datteln, Germany

== See also ==
- Listed buildings in Cannock
