= Prospect Village =

Coordinates: 52.703°N 1.951°W

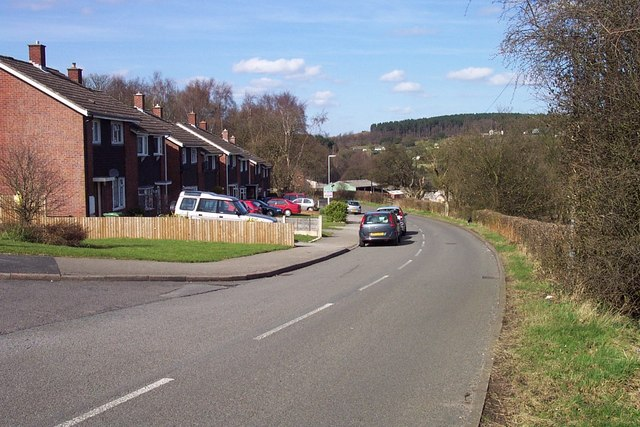

- Location within Staffordshire
- District: Cannock Chase
- Shire county: Staffordshire
- Region: West Midlands
- Country: England
- Sovereign state: United Kingdom
- Post town: Cannock
- Postcode district: WS12
- Police: Staffordshire
- Fire: Staffordshire
- Ambulance: West Midlands
- UK Parliament: Cannock Chase

Prospect Village is a small village in the Cannock Chase District of Staffordshire, West Midlands, England. Located between Burntwood and Hednesford. The village is very small with around 250 residential houses, a village hall, a pub and service garage. The near churches are in Gentleshaw and Cannock Wood. The village was on a mineral-only line from Hednesford to Burntwood. A former embankment is still visible on Ironstone Road and Cannock Wood Road

== History ==
Built in 1926 by the Coal Board Authority to cater for workers in nearby collieries. The village was called Rawnsley New Village until the 1970’s, and was also nicknamed Posh Knob, relating to the great depression when the village was built. Longstaff Avenue was constructed first, followed by Williamson Avenue. Longstaff Avenue had inside toilets, and Williamson Avenue had outside. The first two roads were named after Colonel John Williamson (1824 – 1916) and his son Colonel Robert Summerside Williamson (1859 – 1933).
