= North Staffordshire (district) =

- Proposed unitary authority area
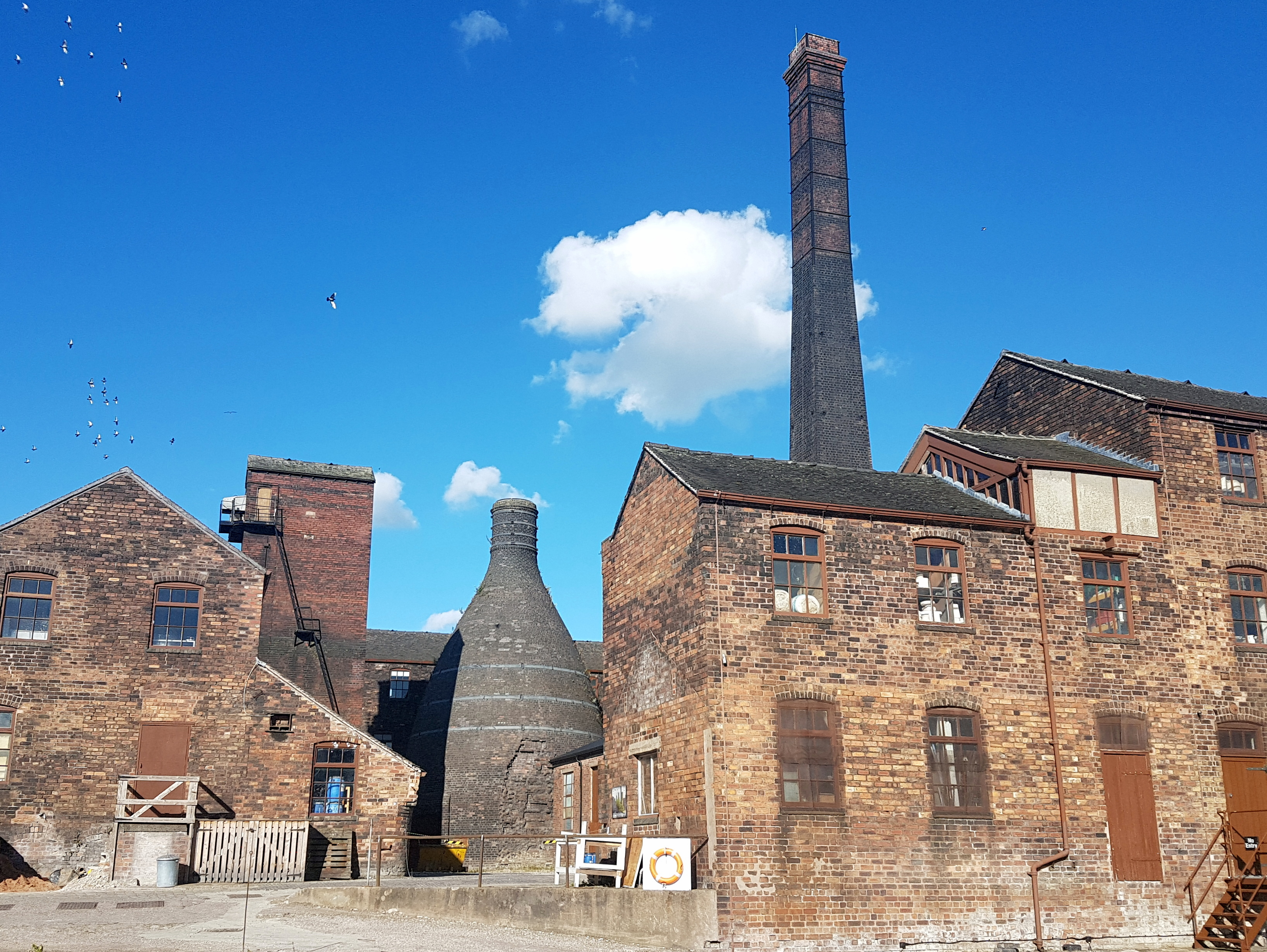
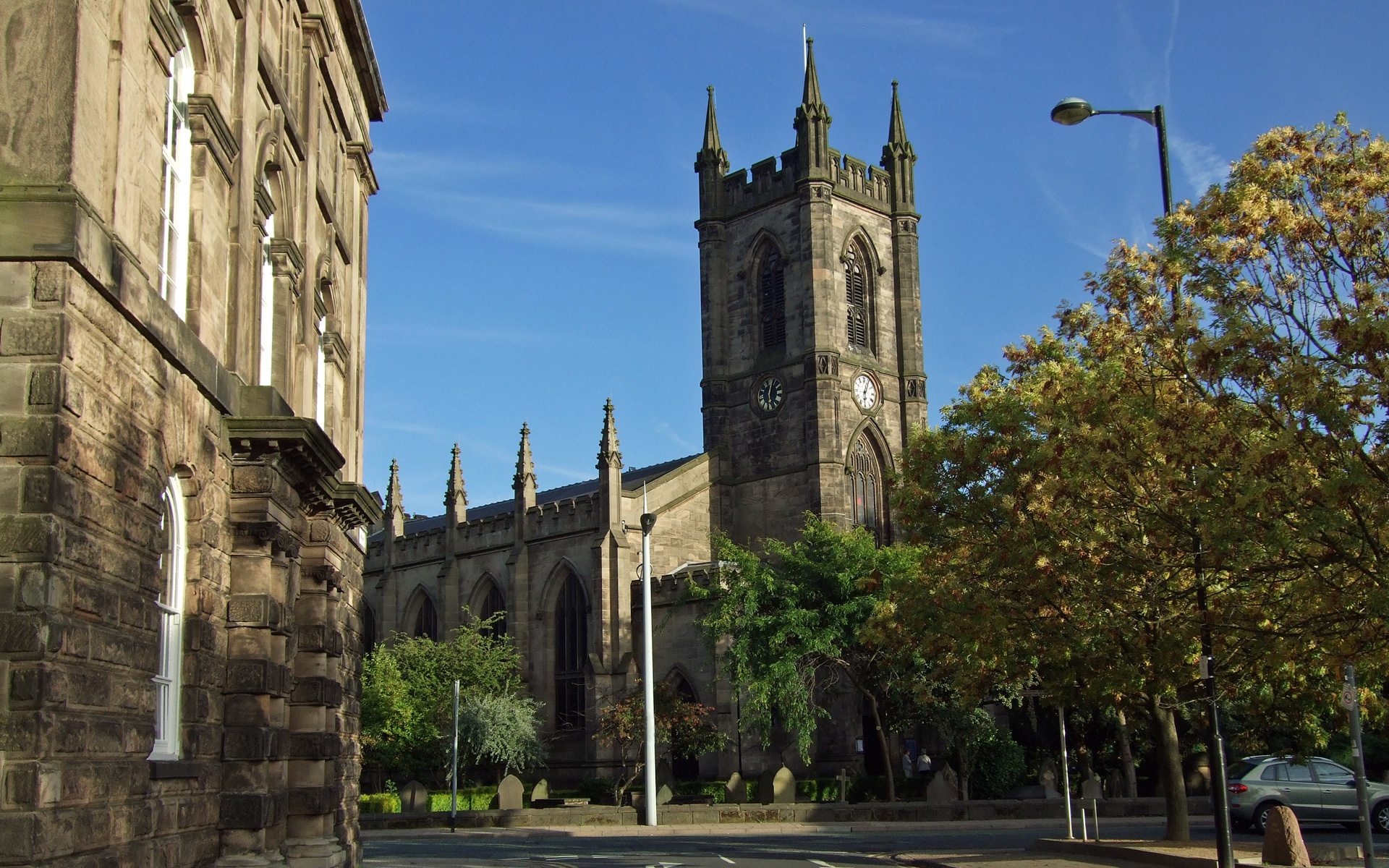
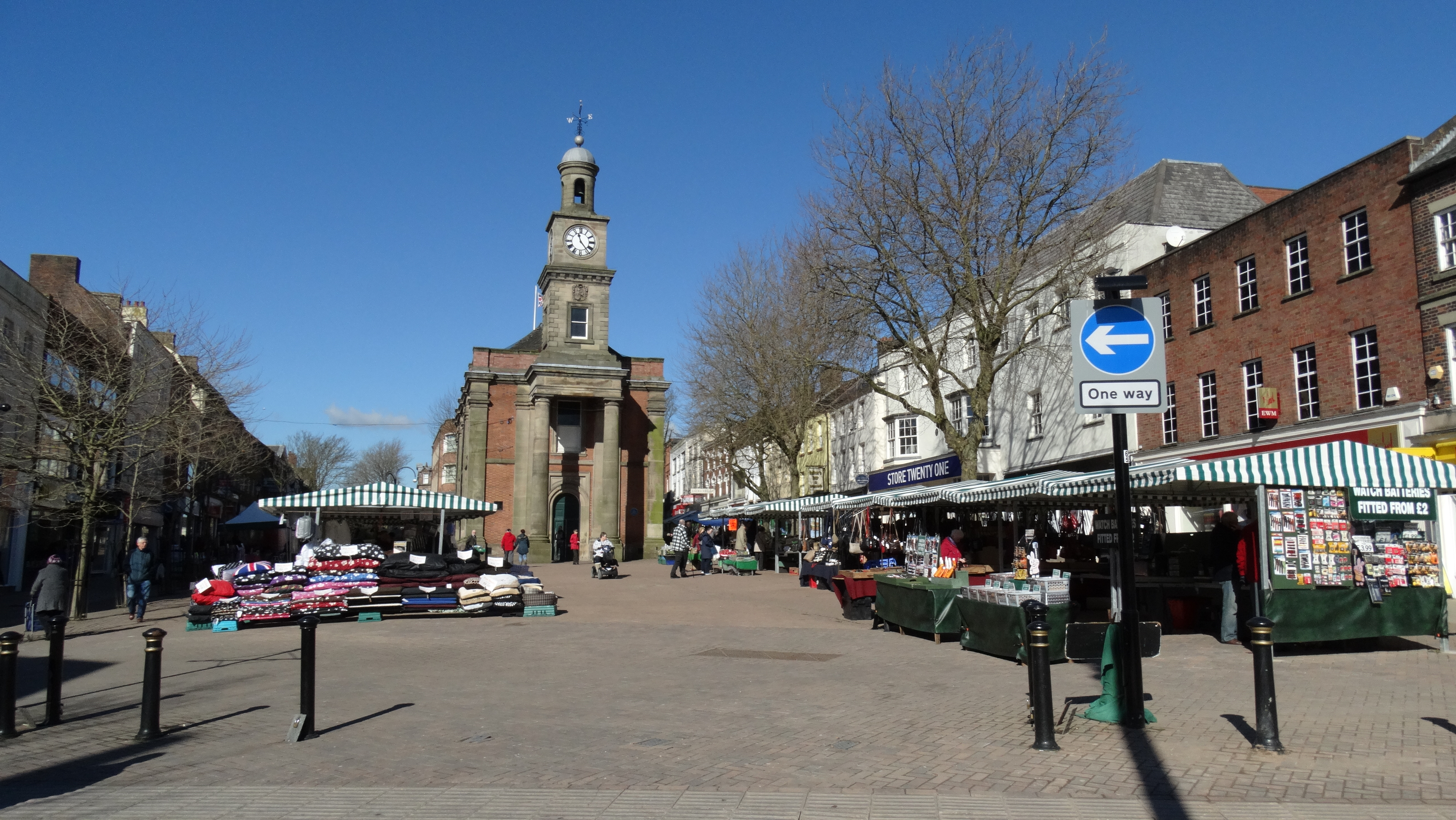
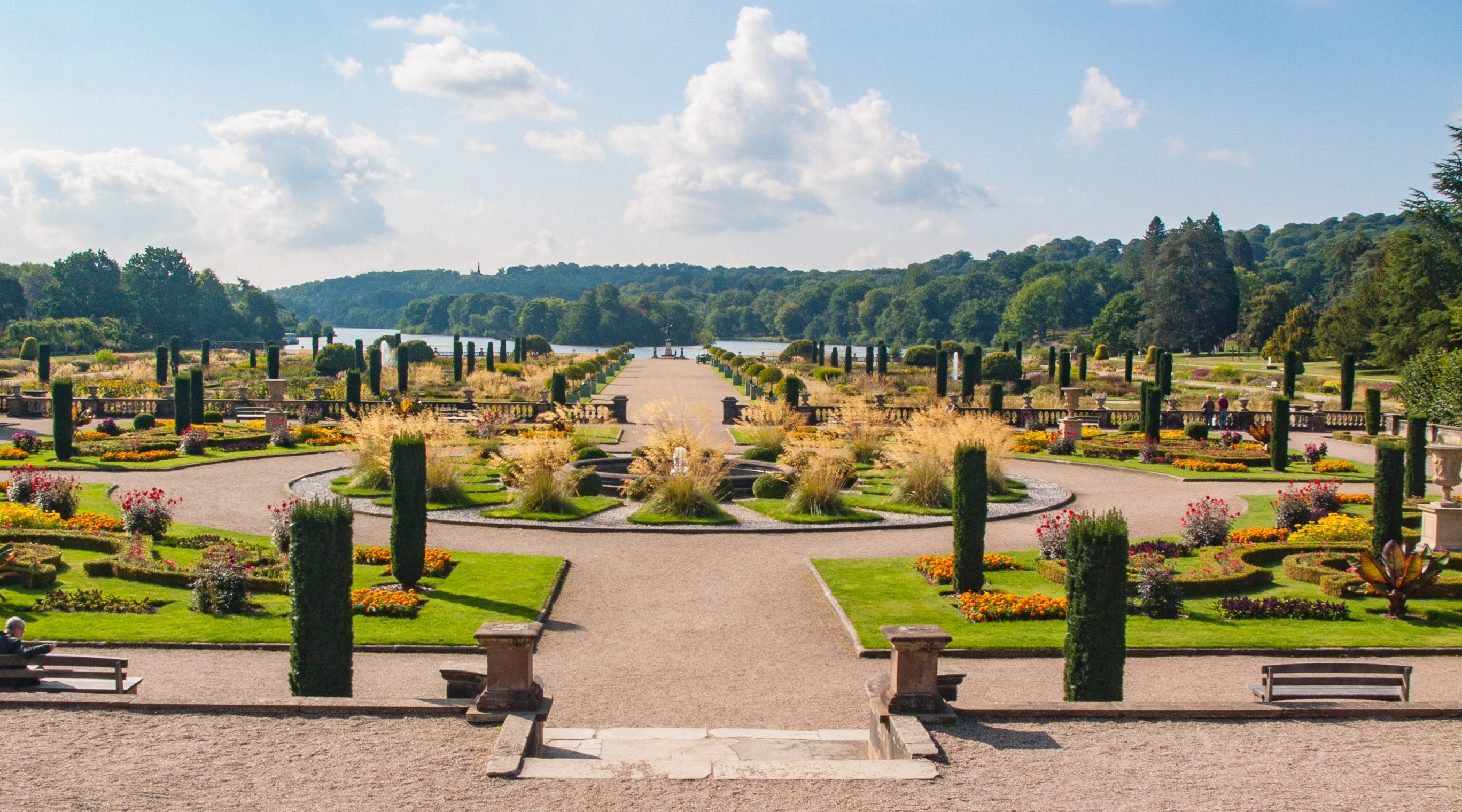
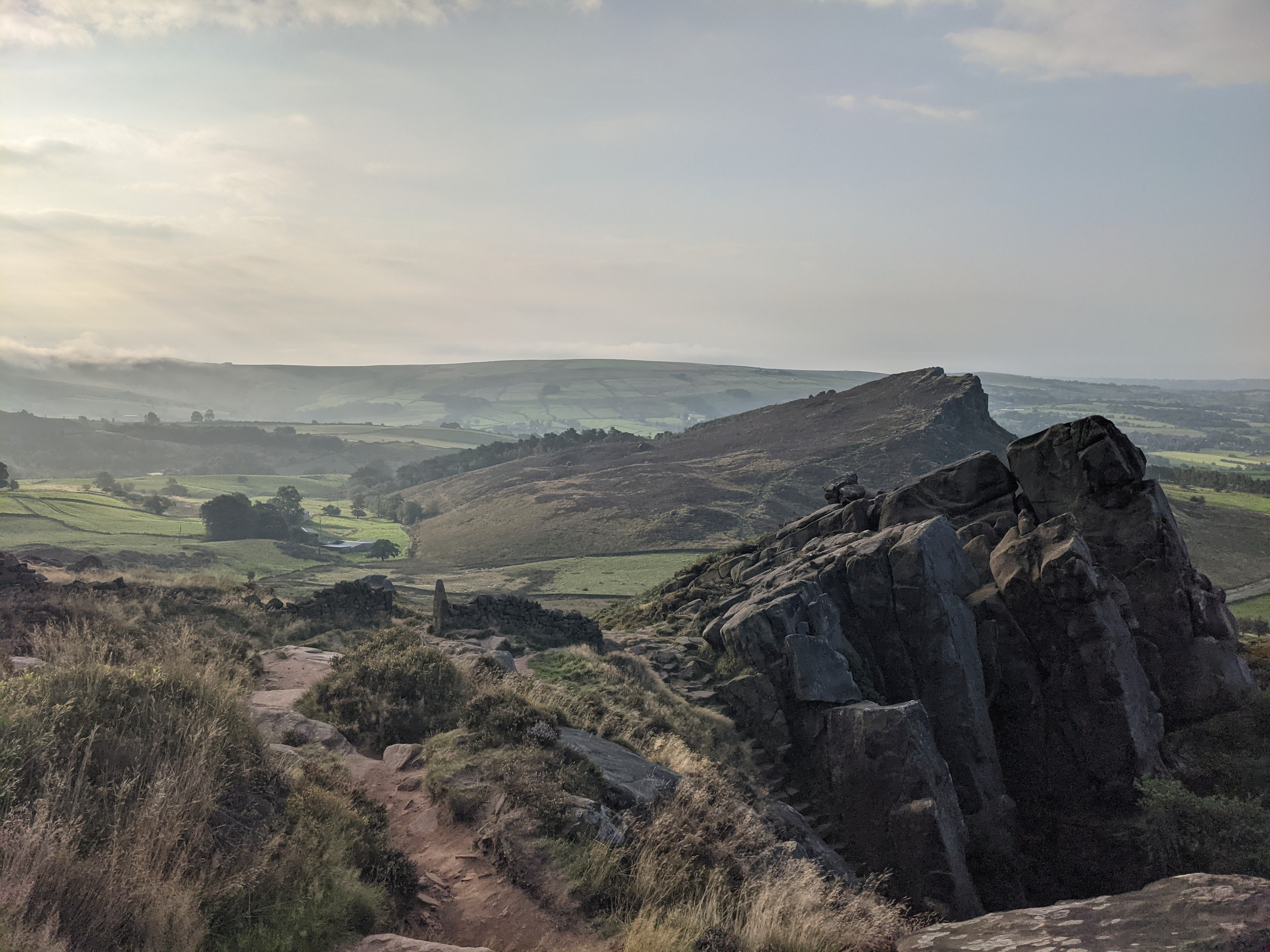
- Clockwise from top: Bottle kilns in Burslem; Guildhall, Newcastle-under-Lyme; The Roaches, Staffordshire Moorlands; Trentham Estate Gardens; and Stoke Minster, Stoke-on-Trent

- Interactive map
- Coordinates: 53.0234°N 2.1754°W
- Sovereign state: United Kingdom
- Country: England
- Region: West Midlands
- Ceremonial county: Staffordshire

Government
  - Type: Unitary authority
  - Body: North Staffordshire Council

Area
  - Total: 339.87 sq mi (880.25 km^{2})

Population (2024 estimate)
  - Total: 494,803
- Time zone: UTC+0 (GMT)
  - Summer (DST): UTC+1 (BST)

North Staffordshire was a proposed unitary authority area in the ceremonial county of Staffordshire, England. It was planned to be formed on 1 April 2028, with the first election planned for May 2027.

Its largest settlement would have been Stoke-on-Trent, which consists of the six towns of Hanley, Stoke-upon-Trent, Burslem, Tunstall, Longton, and Fenton; it would also have included Newcastle-under-Lyme, Biddulph and Kidsgrove, which are part of or very close to the Stoke-on-Trent built-up area. In the east of the district would have been the towns of Leek and Cheadle. The area has a 2024 estimated population of 494,803.

Plans to create it were halted in September 2026 and the first election was cancelled. In October 2026, the plans to create it were withdrawn.

== Formation ==
It would have been formed from the existing unitary authority of Stoke-on-Trent and the existing two-tier Staffordshire districts of Newcastle-under-Lyme and Staffordshire Moorlands. Stoke-on-Trent and Newcastle-under-Lyme are currently unparished, the rest of the area is parished. It is planned that charter trustees will be used to continue Stoke-on-Trent's city status, and Stoke and Newcastle's mayoralties.

North Staffordshire was being formed as part of ongoing local government changes throughout England, in which all areas of the country that have separate county councils and district councils will see those replaced with single-tier, or unitary, local governance. The chosen proposal was backed by Tamworth, Lichfield and South Staffordshire district councils. The two alternative proposals for two unitaries and the proposals for three and four unitaries were not accepted, including Staffordshire County Council's preferred option of an east/west split. The remainder of the county would have formed a new South and Mid Staffordshire authority.

In September 2026, the Staffordshire proposals were halted by the government and placed under review. In October 2026, plans to create it were withdrawn. The decision was threatened with judicial review by Newcastle-under-Lyme Borough Council.

== Governance ==
It would have been run by North Staffordshire Council, which would have comprised 84 councillors.
