= Hazelslade =

Village in Staffordshire, England

Coordinates: 52.714°N 1.968°W

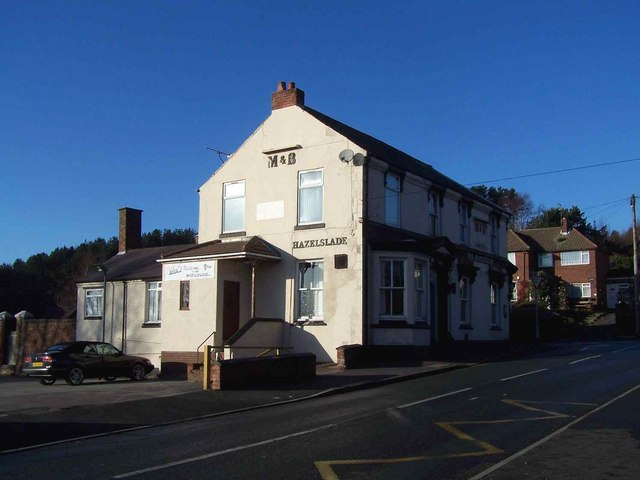
The Hazelslade Pub, Hazelslade, Staffordshire.

Hazelslade is a former mining village in Staffordshire, England. It is now part of Cannock Chase District. The village is located between Hednesford and Rugeley. It has been built into the Rawnsley area of Hednesford and is now effectively a suburban village of Hednesford. The village has a post office, a freehouse and housing estates. There was also a former mineral railway which ran from Hednesford to Burntwood. It can be seen from Google Maps as rows of trees curving around the former mining village and parts of Cannock Chase District to the Chase Line. There is also a bus service which connects the village to Cannock and Burntwood. The nearest mainline railway station is Hednesford. The pub is also named the Hazelslade. The nearest churches are in Church Hill and Hednesford.
