= Bridgtown =

Village in Staffordshire, England

Coordinates: 52.6762°N 2.0289°W

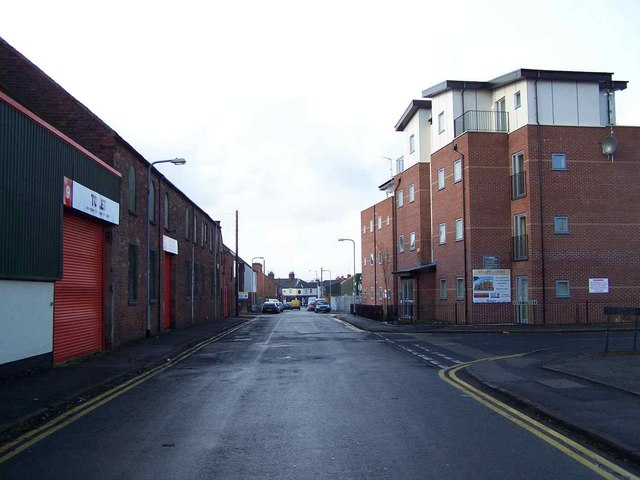
- East Street, Bridgtown, Cannock

- Location within Staffordshire
- Area: 9.24 km^{2} (3.57 sq mi)
- Population: 1,284 (2011 Census)
  - Density: 139/km^{2} (360/sq mi)
- OS grid reference: SJ980101
- District: Cannock Chase
- Shire county: Staffordshire
- Region: West Midlands
- Country: England
- Sovereign state: United Kingdom
- Post town: CANNOCK
- Postcode district: WS11
- Dialling code: 01543
- Police: Staffordshire
- Fire: Staffordshire
- Ambulance: West Midlands
- UK Parliament: Cannock Chase

Bridgtown is a village and civil parish, in the Cannock Chase District of Staffordshire, England. It is situated on the A5 between Cannock and Great Wyrley. There are multiple industrial and retail estates in and around the village, as well as residential areas.

The parish council describe Bridgtown as either a village or an area. There is now only one church in Bridgtown, the Bethel Church. There was one on Church Street but it is now used for commercial purposes.

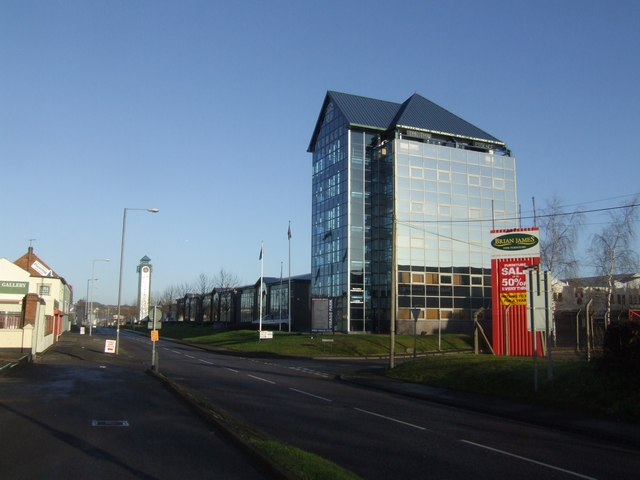
Virage Park, Bridgtown

The Chase Line railway from Rugeley to Walsall passes the south of Bridgtown over the M6 Toll and A5, with the nearest station at Cannock. A proposal for a new station serving Bridgtown and Churchbridge was withdrawn in 2005 due to lack of funding. Bridgtown is served by Chaserider bus service 1 to Huntington, Cannock and Great Wyrley.

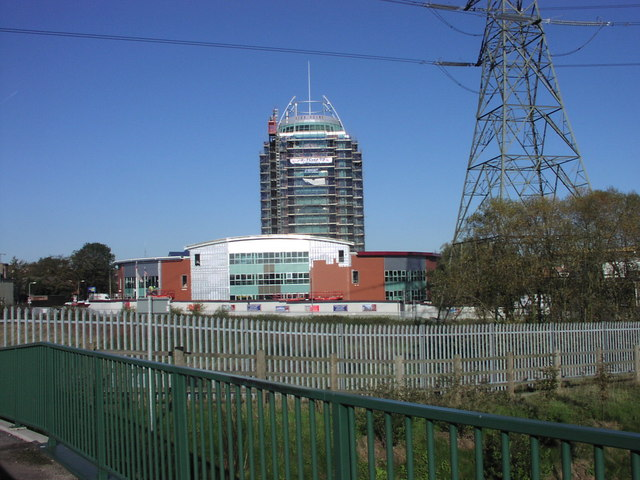
The Ramada Hotel, Bridgtown
