= Cannock Chase District =

Coordinates: 52°43′50″N 1°58′13″W

- Non-metropolitan district
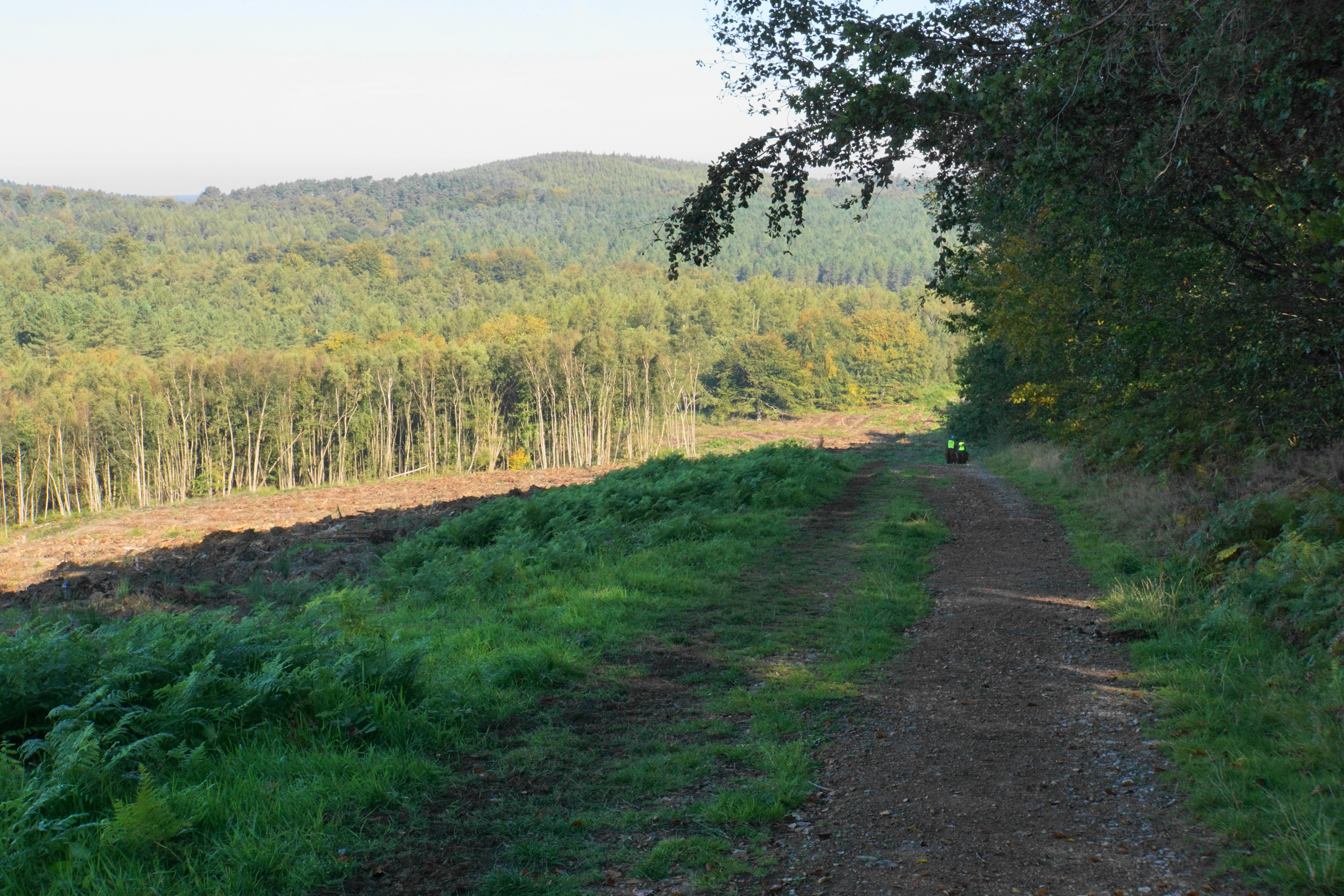
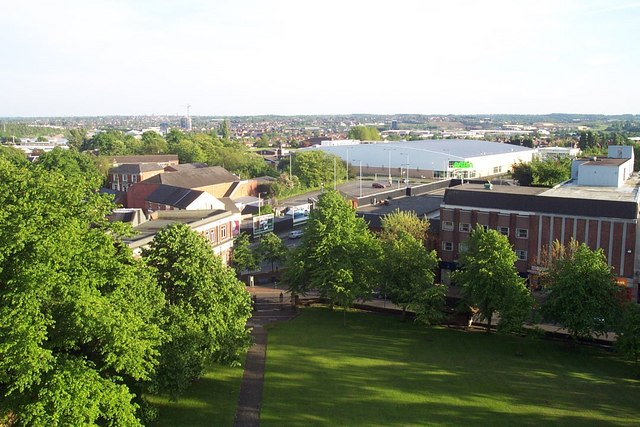
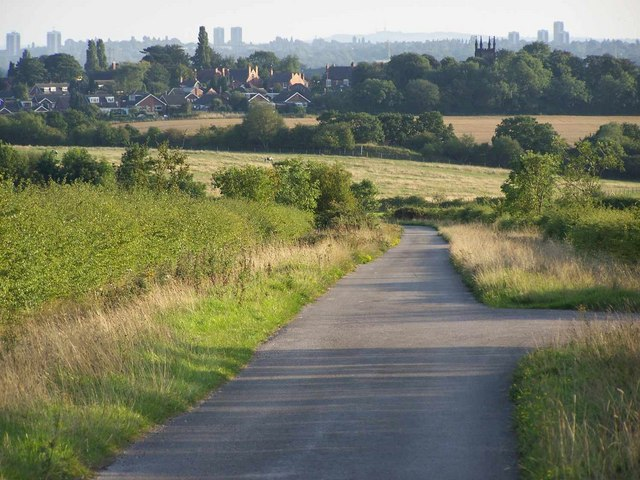
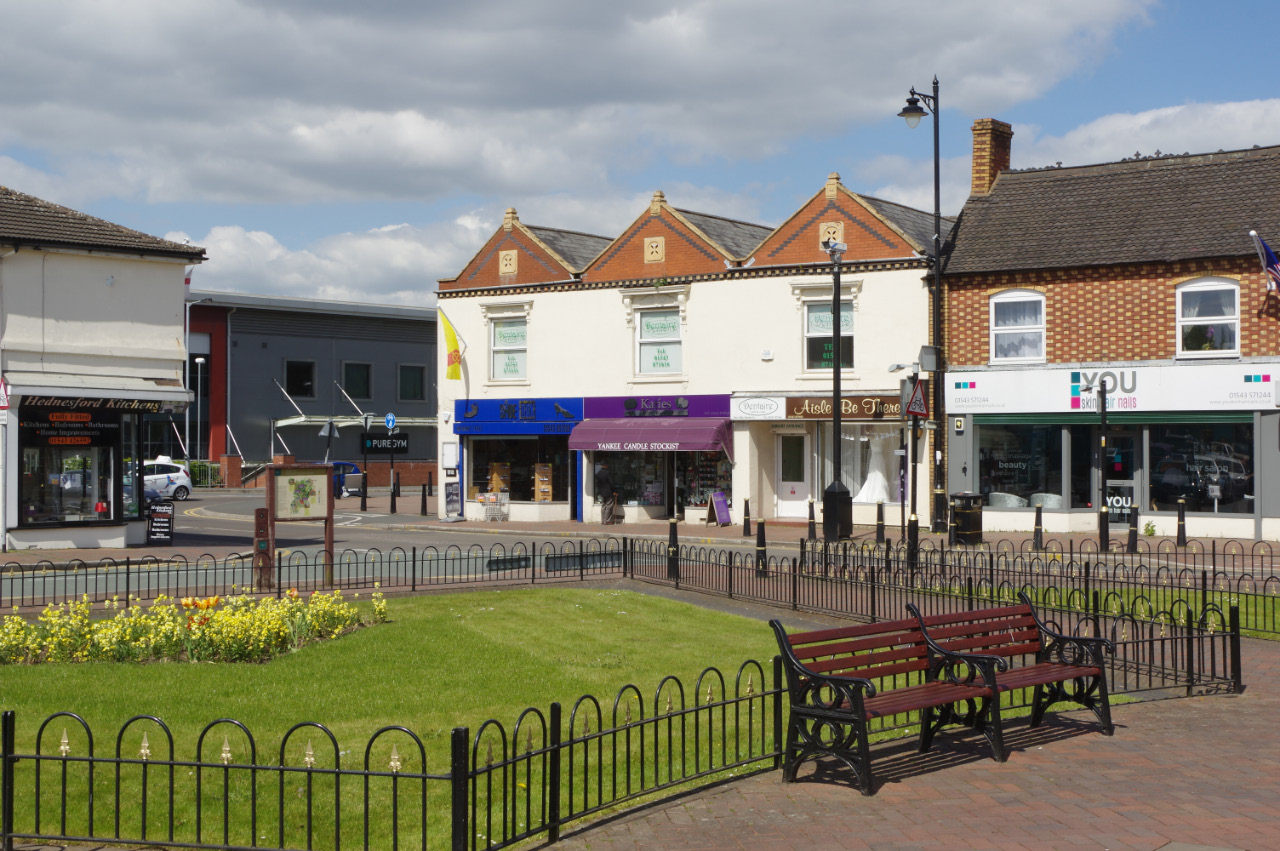
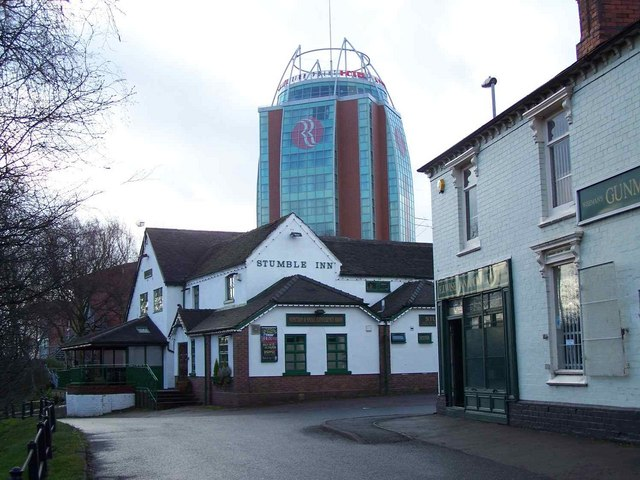
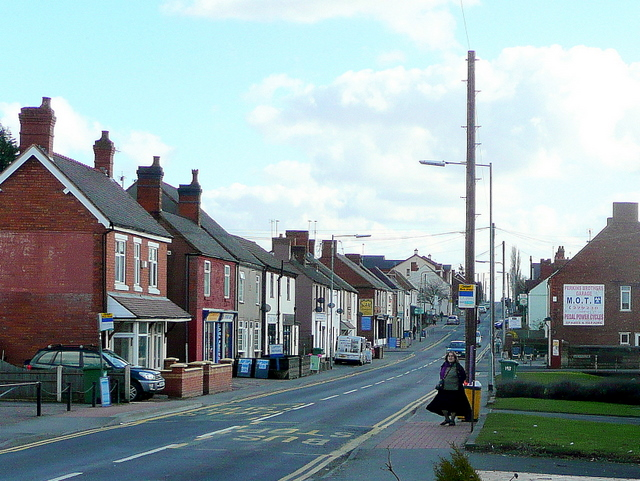
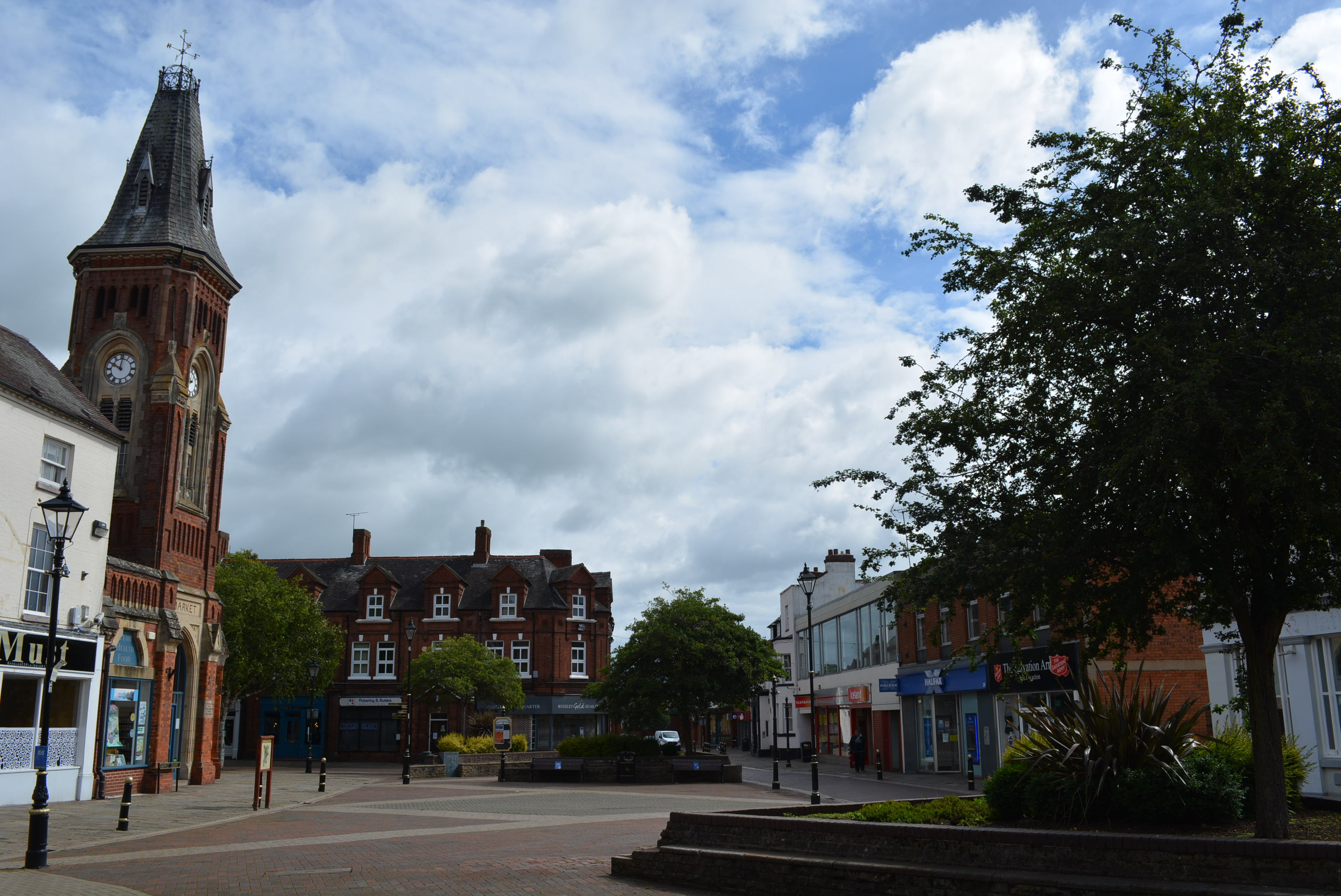
- From left to right; Top: Cannock Chase from the Heart of England Way; Middle 1st: Cannock from St Luke's Church and Norton Canes; Middle 2nd: Hednesford and Bridgtown; Bottom: Heath Hayes and Rugeley

- Cannock Chase shown within Staffordshire
- Sovereign state: United Kingdom
- Constituent country: England
- Region: West Midlands
- Non-metropolitan county: Staffordshire
- Status: Non-metropolitan district
- Admin HQ: Cannock
- Incorporated: 1 April 1974

Government
  - Type: Non-metropolitan district council
  - Body: Cannock Chase Council
  - MP: Josh Newbury

Area
  - Total: 30.5 sq mi (78.9 km^{2})
  - Rank: 219th (of 296)

Population (2025)
  - Total: 104,299
  - Rank: 237th (of 296)
  - Density: 3,420/sq mi (1,320/km^{2})

Ethnicity (2021)
  - Ethnic groups: List: 96.6% White; 1.2% Asian; 1.4% Mixed; 0.5% Black; 0.3% other

Religion (2021)
  - Religion: List: 55.1% Christianity; 43.2% no religion; 0.4% Islam; 0.5% other
- Time zone: UTC0 (GMT)
  - Summer (DST): UTC+1 (BST)
- ONS code: 41UB (ONS); E07000192 (GSS)
- OS grid reference: SK0200614806

Cannock Chase is a local government district in Staffordshire, England. It is named after and covers a large part of Cannock Chase, a designated National Landscape. The council is based in the town of Cannock. The district also contains the towns of Hednesford and Rugeley, as well as a number of villages and surrounding rural areas.

The district borders South Staffordshire to the west, the Borough of Stafford to the north, Lichfield District to the east, and the Metropolitan Borough of Walsall to the south.

== History ==
The district was created on 1 April 1974 under the Local Government Act 1972, covering two former districts plus a single parish from a third, which were all abolished at the same time:

- Brindley Heath parish from Lichfield Rural District
- Cannock Urban District
- Rugeley Urban District

The new district was named Cannock Chase after the landscape and former royal forest which covers much of the area.

== Abolition ==
Under current local government reorganisation plans, all district councils in Staffordshire, as well as the county council, will be abolished in 2028, with the district forming part of a new South and Mid Staffordshire unitary authority. Elections to the new council will take place in May 2027, and it will initially act as a shadow authority.

== Governance ==
Cannock Chase Council

Type
- Type: Non-metropolitan district

Leadership
- Chair: Angela Muckley, Green since 20 May 2026
- Leader: Paul Jones, Reform UK since 20 May 2026
- Chief Executive: Tim Clegg (Note: Joint chief executive with Stafford Borough Council) since 1 June 2021

Structure
- Seats: 36 councillors
- Graph of the party split among 36 seats.
- Political groups: Administration (13) Reform (13) Other parties (23) Labour (11) Conservative (8) Green (3) Independent (1)

Elections
- Voting system: First past the post
- Last election: 7 May 2026

Meeting place
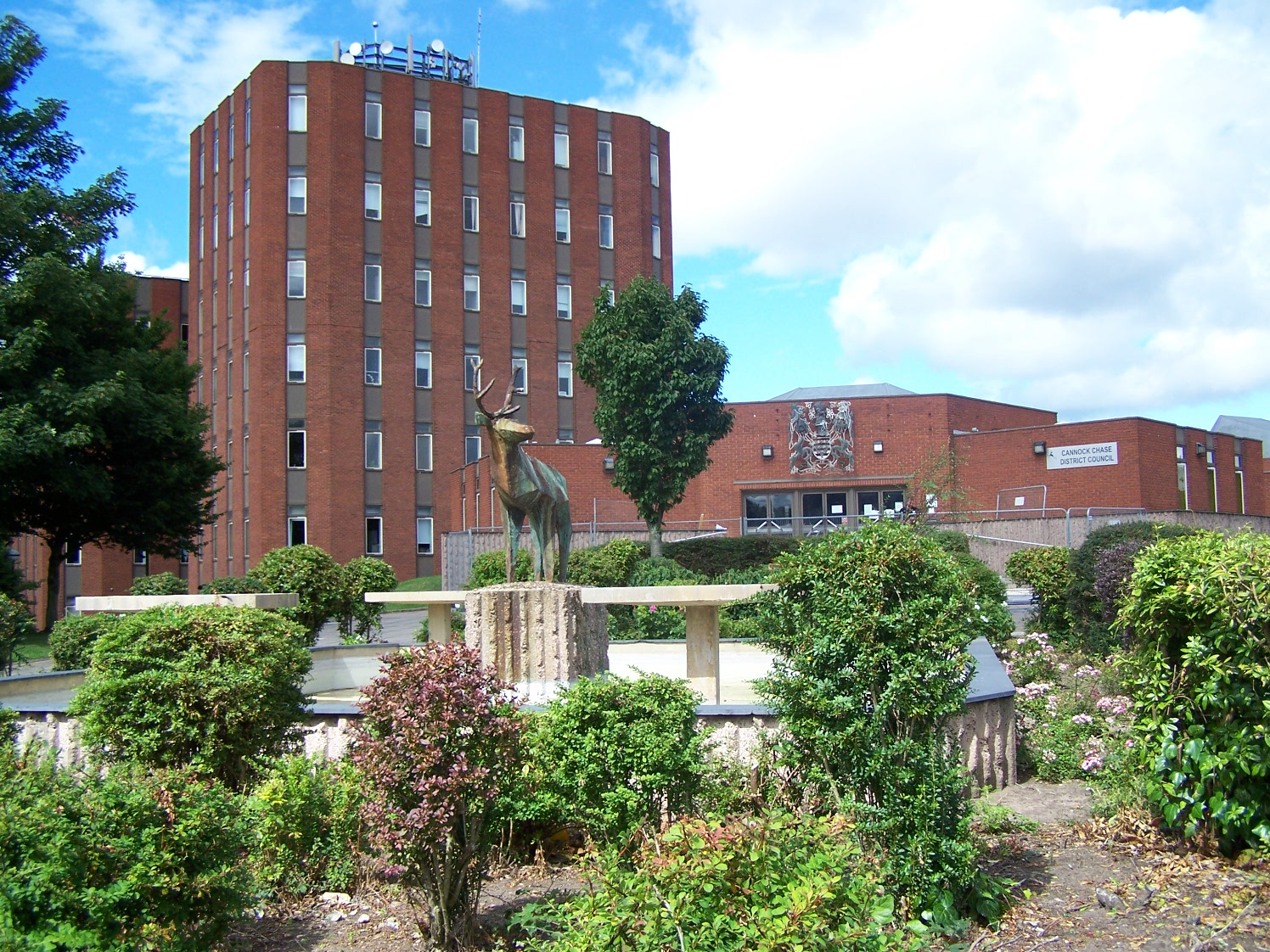
- Civic Centre, Beecroft Road, Cannock, WS11 1BG

Website
- www.cannockchasedc.gov.uk

Cannock Chase District Council, which styles itself "Cannock Chase Council", provides district-level services. County-level services are provided by Staffordshire County Council. Much of the district is also covered by civil parishes, which form a third tier of local government.

The council's logo is a deer, referencing the area's past as a royal hunting forest and the fact that deer are common in the area. A survey in 2022 found that the deer population was growing.

=== Political control ===
The council has been under no overall control since the 2026 election. Reform UK formed the largest party after that election and formed a minority administration.

The first elections to the council were held in 1973, initially operating as a shadow authority alongside the outgoing authorities before coming into its powers on 1 April 1974. Political control of the council since 1974 has been as follows:

Party in control	Years
Labour	1974–1982
No overall control	1982–1987
Labour	1987–2003
No overall control	2003–2012
Labour	2012–2019
No overall control	2019–2021
Conservative	2021–2023
No overall control	2023–2024
Labour	2024–2026
No overall control	2026–present

=== Leadership ===
The leaders of the council since 1991 have been:

Councillor	Party	From	To
George Adamson	Labour		May 1991
Gordon Alcott	Labour	May 1991	May 1994
Gwilym Roberts	Labour	May 1994	May 1999
Mike Holder	Labour	May 1999	May 2003
Reg Cooper	Conservative	May 2003	2005
Neil Stanley	Liberal Democrats	2005	May 2011
George Adamson	Labour	2011	May 2021
Olivia Lyons	Conservative	19 May 2021	May 2023
Tony Johnson	Labour	24 May 2023	24 Sep 2025
Steve Thornley	Labour	24 Sep 2025	May 2026
Paul Jones	Reform	20 May 2026	

=== Composition ===
Following the 2026 election, and subsequent changes up to July 2026, the composition of the council was:

Party	Councillors
Reform	13
Labour	11
Conservative	8
Green	3
Independent	1
Total	36

=== Elections ===
Since the last boundary changes took effect in 2024, the council has comprised 36 councillors representing 12 wards, with each ward electing three councillors. Elections are held three years out of every four, with a third of the council (one councillor for each ward) elected each time for a four-year term of office. Staffordshire County Council elections are held in the fourth year of the cycle when there are no district council elections.

The district covers the same area as the Cannock Chase (UK Parliament constituency). Until the 2010 general election the constituency also included the adjacent village of Huntington in South Staffordshire. From 2010 onwards the constituency has exactly the same boundaries as the district.

=== Premises ===
The council is based at the Civic Centre on Beecroft Road in Cannock. The building was purpose-built for the council between 1978 and 1981.

== Demography ==
According to data from the 2011 United Kingdom census, Cannock Chase has a population of 100,600, with 49,500 males and 51,100 females. 62.5% of the population is between the ages of 16–64, of which 88.7% is economically active, 11.2% above the West Midlands regional average.

== Media ==
In terms of television, the area is served by BBC West Midlands and ITV Central (West) broadcasting from Birmingham. Television signals are received the Sutton Coldfield TV transmitter.

Radio stations for the area are:

- BBC Radio WM
- BBC Radio Stoke can also be received.
- Heart West Midlands
- Greatest Hits Radio Birmingham & The West Midlands
- Hits Radio Staffordshire & Cheshire
- Smooth West Midlands
- Capital Midlands
- Hits Radio Birmingham
- Cannock Chase Radio FM, the district's community based station which broadcast from its studios in Cannock.

The Express & Star is the local newspaper that cover the district.

== Towns and parishes ==
Much of the district is covered by eight civil parishes. The exception is certain parts of Cannock, which are unparished. The parish councils for Hednesford and Rugeley have declared their parishes to be towns, allowing them to take the style "town council".

When the district was created in 1974 it only contained one parish, being Brindley Heath; the former Rugeley Urban District and Cannock Urban District were both unparished. In 1988 two parishes called Rugeley and Brereton were created covering the former Rugeley Urban District, and four parishes called Bridgtown, Cannock Wood, Heath Hayes and Wimblebury, and Norton Canes were created covering parts of the former Cannock Urban District. The parish of Hednesford was subsequently created in 2000 from another part of the former Cannock Urban District.

The parishes are:

- Brereton and Ravenhill
- Bridgtown
- Brindley Heath
- Cannock Wood
- Heath Hayes and Wimblebury
- Hednesford (town)
- Norton Canes
- Rugeley (town)

Other areas and settlements include:

- Chadsmoor
- Church Hill
- Hawks Green
- Hazelslade
- Littleworth
- Little Wyrley
- North Lanes
- Prospect Village
- Pye Green
- Rawnsley
- Slitting Mill
