= Staffordshire County Council elections =

Local government elections in Staffordshire, England

Staffordshire County Council elections are held every four years. Staffordshire County Council is the upper-tier authority for the non-metropolitan county of Staffordshire in England. Since the last boundary changes in 2025, 62 councillors have been elected from 62 electoral divisions.

== Council elections ==
Year	Conservative	Labour	Reform	Liberal Democrats (Note: Liberal Party, 1973–1981; SDP–Liberal Alliance, 1985.)	UKIP	Green (Note: Ecology Party, 1981; Green Party (UK), 1989.)	Stafford Ind.	Staffordshire Independent Group	Residents' and Ratepayers' Associations	Independent	Council control after election
1973	28	47	–	1	–	–	–	–	0	9	Labour
1977	64	16	–	0	–	–	–	–	0	5	Conservative
1981 (Note: Boundary changes reduced the number of seats by three.)	28	48	–	4	–	0	–	–	0	2	Labour
1985	30	48	–	4	–	–	–	–	–	0	Labour
1989	28	50	–	2	–	0	–	–	2	0	Labour
1993	22	53	–	4	–	0	–	–	2	1	Labour
1997 (Note: The number of seats reduced by 20 due to the removal of Stoke-on-Trent.)	20	40	–	2	0	–	–	–	0	0	Labour
2001	24	36	–	2	–	–	–	–	–	0	Labour
2005 (Note: Boundary changes took place but the number of seats remained the same.)	28	32	–	2	0	0	–	–	0	0	Labour
2009	49	3	–	4	4	0	–	1	–	1	Conservative
2013 (Note: Boundary changes took place but the number of seats remained the same.)	34	24	–	0	2	0	–	–	–	2	Conservative
2017	51	10	–	0	0	0	–	–	–	1	Conservative
2021	57	4	0	0	0	0	–	–	–	1	Conservative
2025 (Note: Boundary changes took place but the number of seats remained the same.)	10	1	49	0	0	1	1	–	–	0	Reform

=== Results maps ===
2005 results map

2009 results map

2013 results map

2017 results map

2021 results map

2025 results map

== By-election results ==
=== 1993-1997 ===
Codsall By-Election 8 August 1996
Party	Candidate	Votes	%	±%
Conservative		1,262	55.7	
Liberal Democrats		504	22.2	
Labour		500	22.1	
Majority		758	33.5	
Turnout		2,266	22.7	
Conservative hold		Swing		

=== 1997-2001 ===
Burntwood Chase By-Election 18 November 1999
Party	Candidate	Votes	%	±%
Labour		574	56.9	−4.9
Conservative		246	24.4	+24.4
Liberal Democrats		188	18.7	−4.2
Majority		328	32.5	
Turnout		1,008	10.7	
Labour hold		Swing		

Stafford Southgate By-Election 30 March 2000
Party	Candidate	Votes	%	±%
Conservative		1,832	60.8	+17.4
Labour		763	25.3	−15.7
Liberal Democrats		420	13.9	−1.8
Majority		1,069	35.5	
Turnout		3,015	26.8	
Conservative hold		Swing		

=== 2001-2005 ===
Gnossal By-Election 7 February 2002
Party	Candidate	Votes	%	±%
Liberal Democrats		1,273	49.4	+21.0
Conservative		1,134	44.0	+2.8
Labour		172	6.7	−18.7
Majority		139	5.4	
Turnout		2,579	24.5	
Liberal Democrats gain from Conservative		Swing		

The Heaths By-Election 21 March 2002
Party	Candidate	Votes	%	±%
Labour		701	45.8	−7.1
Conservative		626	40.9	+7.1
Liberal Democrats		202	13.2	−0.1
Majority		75	4.9	
Turnout		1,529	11.0	
Labour hold		Swing		

Lichfield Rural East By-Election 2 May 2002
Party	Candidate	Votes	%	±%
Liberal Democrats		1,377	41.9	+20.2
Conservative		1,202	36.6	−11.0
Labour		709	21.6	−9.1
Majority		175	5.3	
Turnout		3,288		
Liberal Democrats gain from Conservative		Swing		

The Hayes By-Election 27 March 2003
Party	Candidate	Votes	%	±%
Labour	Janos Toth	624	36.7	−11.0
Liberal Democrats	P Ansell	558	33.0	+14.5
Conservative	P Freeman	507	30.0	−3.9
Majority		66	3.7	
Turnout		1,689	13.3	
Labour hold		Swing		

=== 2005-2009 ===
Kinver By-Election 23 June 2005
Party	Candidate	Votes	%	±%
Conservative	Brian Edwards	2,403	62.5	+2.0
Liberal Democrats	Robert Simmons	1,051	27.3	+7.1
Labour	Kevin McElduff	388	10.1	−9.4
Majority		1,352	35.2	
Turnout		3,842		
Conservative hold		Swing		

Cheadle & Checkley By-Election 13 July 2006
Party	Candidate	Votes	%	±%
Conservative	Michael Maryon	791	47.6	−2.9
Ratepayer	Peter Elkin	560	33.7	+33.7
Liberal Democrats	Philip Silk	311	18.7	+1.8
Majority		231	13.9	
Turnout		962	14.8	
Conservative hold		Swing		

Keele and Westlands By-Election 12 July 2007
Party	Candidate	Votes	%	±%
Conservative	Simon Tagg	1,067	43.8	−1.5
Liberal Democrats	Marion Reddish	1,005	39.5	+6.6
Labour	David Beardmore	268	10.5	−13.9
UKIP	Wayne Harling	204	8.0	+4.7
Majority		62	2.4	
Turnout		2,544	20.4	
Conservative hold		Swing		

Newcastle Rural By-Election 1 May 2008
Party	Candidate	Votes	%	±%
Conservative	Frank Chapman	1,994	50.7	+4.2
Liberal Democrats	David Becket	820	20.9	−1.4
Labour		588	15.0	−10.9
UKIP	David Howell	529	13.5	+8.2
Majority		1,174	29.8	
Turnout		3,931		
Conservative hold		Swing		

=== 2009-2013 ===
Burton Town By-Election 16 June 2011
Party	Candidate	Votes	%	±%
Labour	Ron Clarke	1,233	43.7	+9.3
Conservative	Ahmet Orta	884	31.3	+8.5
Liberal Democrats	Michael Rodgers	525	18.6	−9.1
UKIP	Peter McGuiggan	182	6.4	+6.4
Majority		349	12.4	
Turnout		2,824		
Labour hold		Swing		

Churnet Valley By-Election 7 July 2011
Party	Candidate	Votes	%	±%
Conservative	Mike Worthington	1,063	52.0	−1.9
Labour	Mahfooz Ahmad	491	24.0	+4.4
UKIP	Darren Federici	316	15.5	+15.5
Liberal Democrats	Nicholas Brewin	173	8.5	−18.0
Majority		572	28.0	
Turnout		2,043		
Conservative hold		Swing		

Leek South By-Election 9 February 2012
Party	Candidate	Votes	%	±%
Conservative	Neal Podmore	725	27.3	−0.8
UKIP	Alex Povey	556	20.9	−15.7
Labour	Margaret Lovatt	432	16.2	+6.4
Liberal Democrats	John Fisher	419	15.8	−3.0
Moorlands Democratic Alliance	Pamela Wood	336	12.6	+12.6
Independent	Bill Cawley	192	7.2	+7.2
Majority		169	6.4	
Turnout		2,660		
Conservative gain from UKIP		Swing		

=== 2013-2017 ===
Uttoxeter Town By-Election 5 May 2016
Party	Candidate	Votes	%	±%
Conservative	David Brookes	1,247	42.6	+2.9
Labour	John McKiernan	967	33.0	−3.2
UKIP	Julian Lee	713	24.4	+3.9
Majority		280	9.6	
Turnout		2,927		
Conservative hold		Swing		

=== 2017-2021 ===
Hednesford and Rawnsley By-Election 7 September 2017
Party	Candidate	Votes	%	±%
Conservative	Bryan Jones	1,484	32.5	−3.5
Labour	George Adamson	1,454	31.9	+4.2
Green	Paul Woodhead	1,316	28.9	+3.8
UKIP	John Bernard	175	3.8	−3.9
Liberal Democrats	Pat Ansell	67	1.5	+1.5
Chase Independent Party	Ron Turville	65	1.4	−2.1
Majority		30	0.7	
Turnout		4,561		
Conservative hold		Swing		

Codsall By-Election 8 February 2018
Party	Candidate	Votes	%	±%
Conservative	Bob Spencer	1,274	67.6	−7.5
Green	Gary Burnett	329	17.4	+6.7
Labour	Kevin McElduff	283	15.0	+0.8
Majority		945	50.1	
Turnout		1,886		
Conservative hold		Swing		

Watling South By-Election 12 December 2019
Party	Candidate	Votes	%	±%
Conservative	Richard Ford	4,304	67.5	+8.4
Labour	Simon Peaple	1,493	23.4	−0.6
Liberal Democrats	Roger Jones	580	9.1	+4.7
Majority		2,811	44.1	
Turnout		6,377		
Conservative hold		Swing		

=== 2021-2025 ===
Biddulph North By-Election 19 January 2023
Party	Candidate	Votes	%	±%
Labour	Nigel Yates	931	49.5	+13.8
Independent	Andrew Hart	493	26.2	+26.2
Conservative	Rathi Pragasam	458	24.3	−33.3
Majority		438	23.3	
Turnout		1,882		
Labour gain from Conservative		Swing		

Watling South By-Election 2 March 2023
Party	Candidate	Votes	%	±%
Conservative	Alex Farrell	858	46.6	−20.0
Labour	Carol Dean	714	38.8	+10.1
Liberal Democrats	Helen Miller-Viney	160	8.7	+8.7
Reform	Barry Gwilt	110	6.0	+6.0
Majority		144	7.8	
Turnout		1,842		
Conservative hold		Swing		

=== 2025-2029 ===
Eccleshall and Gnosall By-Election 17 July 2025
Party	Candidate	Votes	%	±%
Conservative	Jeremy Pert	1,689	44.4	+10.1
Green	Scott Spencer	1,037	27.3	+8.3
Reform	Ray Barron	938	24.7	–10.2
Labour	Leah Elston-Thompson	140	3.7	–3.8
Majority		652	17.1	
Turnout		3,804		
Conservative gain from Reform		Swing		

Stretton By-Election 25 June 2026
Party	Candidate	Votes	%	±%
Reform	Jonathan Pyke	902	37.1	–2.0
Conservative	Bernard Peters	871	35.8	+5.6
Labour	Shelagh McKiernan	448	18.4	–1.1
Green	Jack Mellor	213	8.8	+4.3
Majority		31	1.3	
Turnout		2,434		
Reform hold		Swing		
