= 2025 Staffordshire County Council election =

2025 English local election

- 1 May 2025

All 62 seats to Staffordshire County Council 32 seats needed for a majority
	First party	Second party	Third party
Leader	none	Alan White (defeated)	Charlotte Atkins (defeated)
Party	Reform	Conservative	Labour
Last election	0 seats, 0.2%	57 seats, 56.6%	4 seats, 26.2%
Seats won	49	10	1
Seat change	▲49	▼47	▼3
Popular vote	91,128	61,474	35,500
Percentage	41.2%	27.8%	16.1%
Swing	▲41.0 pp	▼28.8 pp	▼10.1 pp
	Fourth party	Fifth party
Leader	none	none
Party	Green	Stafford Ind.
Last election	0 seats, 6.4%	did not exist
Seats won	1	1
Seat change	▲1	Steady
Popular vote	12,608	2,597
Percentage	5.7%	1.2%
Swing	▼0.7 pp	N/A
- Winner of each seat at the 2025 Staffordshire County Council election.
Leader before election
Alan White
Conservative
Leader after election
Ian Cooper
Reform

The 2025 Staffordshire County Council election took place on 1 May 2025 to elect members to Staffordshire County Council in Staffordshire, England. All 62 seats will be elected. This was on the same day as other local elections.

In the previous 2021 election, the Conservatives won a majority of seats. However following national trends, their share of the vote in the 2025 dropped dramatically. Reform UK secured an overall majority on the council, winning control from the Conservative Party.

== Previous council composition ==
After 2021 election		Before 2025 election	
Party	Seats	Party	Seats
Conservative	57	Conservative	53
Labour	4	Labour	5
Independent	1	Independent	4

=== Changes 2021–2025 ===
- January 2022: Tom Loughbrough-Rudd (Conservative) suspended from party
- October 2022: Ian Lawson (Conservative) dies – by-election held January 2023
- January 2023: Nigel Yates (Labour) gains by-election from Conservatives; Richard Ford (Conservative) resigns – by-election held March 2023
- March 2023: Alex Farrell (Conservative) wins by-election
- October 2024: Thomas Jay (Conservative) leaves party to sit as an independent
- December 2024: Mike Wilcox (Conservative) leaves party to sit as an independent

== Summary ==
The council was under Conservative majority control prior to the election. The election saw Reform UK go from having no seats on the council to winning an overall majority, with 49 of the 62 seats. The leader of the council prior to the election, Conservative councillor Alan White, lost his seat. Reform chose Ian Cooper to be their new group leader after the election. He was formally appointed as the new leader of the council at the subsequent annual council meeting on 22 May 2025.

=== Election result ===
2025 Staffordshire County Council election
Party	Candidates	Seats	Gains	Losses	Net gain/loss	Seats %	Votes %	Votes	+/−
Reform	62	49	33	0	▲49	79.0	41.2	91,128	+41.0
Conservative	62	10	0	30	▼47	16.1	27.8	61,474	–28.8
Labour	62	1	0	3	▼3	1.6	16.1	35,500	–10.1
Green	44	1	0	0	▲1	1.6	5.7	12,608	–0.7
Stafford Borough Independents	2	1	0	0	Steady	1.6	1.2	2,597	N/A
Liberal Democrats	42	0	0	0	Steady	0.0	5.4	11,910	+2.7
Independent	15	0	0	0	Steady	0.0	2.3	5,149	–1.8
UKIP	5	0	0	0	Steady	0.0	0.2	356	–0.8
TUSC	3	0	0	0	Steady	0.0	0.1	168	±0.0
Workers Party	1	0	0	0	Steady	0.0	<0.1	56	N/A

== Results by district ==
The results of the election were counted and seats declared on 2 May 2025.

=== Cannock Chase ===
Cannock Chase district summary
Party	Seats	+/-	Votes	%	+/-
Reform UK	7	▲7	13,012	53.5	+53.1
Conservative	0	▼7	4,473	18.4	–31.6
Labour	0	Steady	3,339	13.7	–12.7
Green	0	Steady	2,725	11.2	+8.1
Independent	0	Steady	492	2.0	+1.4
Liberal Democrats	0	Steady	196	0.8	–1.1
UKIP	0	Steady	70	0.3	N/A
TUSC	0	Steady	30	0.1	–0.2
Total	7	Steady	24,337	31.5	
Registered electors			77,326	–	

Division results

Brereton & Ravenhill
Party	Candidate	Votes	%	±%
Reform	Neil Parton	1,210	49.5	N/A
Labour Co-op	David Williams	464	19.0	–15.4
Conservative	Joshua Birch	358	14.6	–26.0
Independent	Gerald Molineux	268	11.0	N/A
Green	Mandi Boyer	144	5.9	+0.9
Majority		746	30.5	N/A
Turnout		2,448	28.4	–0.1
Registered electors		8,618		
Reform gain from Conservative				

Cannock Town Centre
Party	Candidate	Votes	%	±%
Reform	Martin Murray	1,982	51.5	N/A
Conservative	Paul Snape*	942	24.5	–37.3
Labour	Garry Samuels	580	15.1	–6.4
Green	Eloise Cropp	318	8.3	+2.7
TUSC	Gareth Knox	30	0.8	N/A
Majority		1,040	27.0	N/A
Turnout		3,857	33.5	+2.1
Registered electors		11,520		
Reform gain from Conservative				

Chadsmoor
Party	Candidate	Votes	%	±%
Reform	Alex Hunt	2,053	62.9	N/A
Labour Co-op	Jacquie Prestwood	512	15.7	–27.3
Conservative	Philippa Haden*	436	13.4	–35.5
Green	Joanne Elson	161	4.9	–3.2
Liberal Democrats	Anthony Thompson	102	3.1	N/A
Majority		1,541	47.2	N/A
Turnout		3,269	29.8	+3.9
Registered electors		10,783		
Reform gain from Conservative				

Etching Hill & The Heath
Party	Candidate	Votes	%	±%
Reform	Jon Pendleton	1,525	46.0	N/A
Conservative	Mike Sutherland*	915	27.6	–38.2
Labour Co-op	Darren Foley	497	15.0	–12.7
Independent	Alan Dudson	188	5.7	N/A
Green	David Green	188	5.7	–0.8
Majority		610	18.4	N/A
Turnout		3,321	32.5	–0.8
Registered electors		10,231		
Reform gain from Conservative				

Hawks Green, Rawnsley & Cannock Wood
Party	Candidate	Votes	%
Reform	Rhys Mandry	1,973	47.2
Green	Richard Jenking	964	23.1
Conservative	Phil Hewitt*	789	18.9
Labour	James Withington	286	6.8
Liberal Democrats	Matthew Scotchmer	94	2.3
UKIP	Terry Dryhurst	70	1.7
Majority		1,009	24.1
Turnout		4,182	34.9
Registered electors		11,968	
Reform win (new seat)			

Hednesford North
Party	Candidate	Votes	%
Reform	Paul Jones	2,019	56.4
Green	Darrell Mawle	754	21.1
Labour Co-op	Paula Stanton	423	11.8
Conservative	Anthony Boucker	348	9.7
Independent	Ronald Turville	36	1.0
Majority		1,265	35.3
Turnout		3,586	29.8
Registered electors		12,015	
Reform win (new seat)			

Norton Canes, Heath Hayes & Wimblebury
Party	Candidate	Votes	%
Reform	Daniel Cecil	2,250	60.7
Conservative	Sam Priest	685	18.5
Labour Co-op	Lisa Wilson	577	15.6
Green	Ian Wallace	196	5.3
Majority		1,565	42.2
Turnout		3,721	30.5
Registered electors		12,191	
Reform win (new seat)			

=== East Staffordshire ===
East Staffordshire district summary
Party	Seats	+/-	Votes	%	+/-
Reform UK	5	▲5	10,152	37.4	N/A
Conservative	3	▼3	8,628	31.8	–20.3
Labour	1	▼1	5,254	19.4	–9.6
Green	0	Steady	2,281	8.4	+1.5
Liberal Democrats	0	Steady	825	3.0	+1.1
Total	9	▲1	27,140	31.3	
Registered electors			92,474	–	

Division results

Burton South
Party	Candidate	Votes	%
Reform	Peter Mason	1,062	47.4
Conservative	Mike Metcalfe	551	24.6
Labour	Adriana Bailey	423	18.9
Green	Cate Ilett	206	9.2
Majority		511	22.8
Turnout		2,249	25.1
Registered electors		8,963	
Reform win (new seat)			

Burton Tower
Party	Candidate	Votes	%	±%
Conservative	Conor Wileman*	1,376	39.2	−19.6
Reform	Tracy Sutcliffe	1,139	32.5	N/A
Labour	Simon Slater	652	18.6	−3.1
Liberal Democrats	Robert Coates	173	4.9	N/A
Green	Elliott Sutton-Page	169	4.8	−0.7
Majority		237	6.7	–30.5
Turnout		3,518	32.0	
Registered electors		10,989		
Conservative hold		Swing		

Burton Town
Party	Candidate	Votes	%	±%
Reform	Michael Carver	685	35.3	N/A
Labour	Arshad Afsar*	672	34.7	–14.9
Conservative	Ray Faulkner	320	16.5	–13.0
Green	Cameron Lawndes	261	13.5	+9.0
Majority		13	0.6	N/A
Turnout		3,721	31.7	
Registered electors		11,745		
Reform gain from Labour				

Burton Trent
Party	Candidate	Votes	%	±%
Labour	Syed Hussain*	1,021	41.7	–17.2
Reform	Jonathan Pyke	766	31.3	N/A
Conservative	Colin Wileman	377	15.4	–17.5
Green	Anthony Bates	144	5.9	+2.9
Liberal Democrats	Theodore Hollier	143	5.8	+2.5
Majority		255	10.4	–15.6
Turnout		2,458	24.6	
Registered electors		9,986		
Labour hold				

Dove
Party	Candidate	Votes	%	±%
Conservative	Philip White*	1,414	43.7	–14.6
Reform	Paul Allen	1,081	33.4	N/A
Labour	Simon Peaple	376	11.6	–21.0
Green	Dale Barr	364	11.3	+5.9
Majority		333	10.3	–15.4
Turnout		3,242	34.9	
Registered electors		9,286		
Conservative hold				

Needwood Forest
Party	Candidate	Votes	%	±%
Conservative	Catherine Brown	1,312	37.3	–30.1
Reform	Richard Howard	1,281	36.5	N/A
Labour	Rosie Harvey-Coggins	447	12.7	–7.9
Liberal Democrats	Patrice Moreau	303	8.6	+3.9
Green	Jack Mellor	171	4.9	–2.3
Majority		31	0.8	–46.0
Turnout		3,521	35.2	
Registered electors		10,000		
Conservative hold		Swing		

Stretton
Party	Candidate	Votes	%
Reform	Barry Martin	1,214	39.1
Conservative	Bernard Peters	938	30.2
Labour Co-op	Shelagh McKiernan	605	19.5
Liberal Democrats	Neville Ingley	206	6.6
Green	Shane Robinson	140	4.5
Majority		276	8.9
Turnout		3,107	26.7
Registered electors		11,630	
Reform win (new seat)			

Uttoxeter Rural
Party	Candidate	Votes	%	±%
Reform	Gary Hales	1,432	38.8	N/A
Conservative	Philip Atkins*	1,407	38.1	–34.7
Green	Geoffrey Aris	496	13.4	+5.3
Labour Co-op	Matthew Simpson	357	9.7	–3.4
Majority		25	0.7	N/A
Turnout		3,696	41.2	
Registered electors		8,978		
Reform gain from Conservative				

Uttoxeter Town
Party	Candidate	Votes	%	±%
Reform	Patrick Allen	1,492	43.2	N/A
Conservative	Philip Hudson*	933	27.0	–4.1
Labour	Rob Hawkins	701	20.3	–0.3
Green	Oliver Ragg	330	9.5	–7.1
Majority		559	16.2	N/A
Turnout		3,456	31.7	
Registered electors		10,898		
Reform gain from Conservative				

=== Lichfield ===
Lichfield district summary
Party	Seats	+/-	Votes	%	+/-
Reform UK	5	▲5	10,391	36.5	N/A
Conservative	3	▼5	8,684	30.5	–27.9
Labour	0	Steady	5,436	19.1	–7.1
Liberal Democrats	0	Steady	3,306	11.6	+2.2
Green	0	Steady	686	2.4	–1.8
Total	8	Steady	28,503	33.3	
Registered electors			85,075	–	

Division results

Burntwood North
Party	Candidate	Votes	%	±%
Reform	Andrew Clissett	1,888	51.8	N/A
Conservative	Richard Stephenson	794	21.8	–27.2
Labour	Jane Smith	721	19.8	–28.0
Liberal Democrats	Paul Ray	241	6.6	+3.3
Majority		1,094	30.0	N/A
Turnout		3,652	33.2	+3.1
Registered electors		10,997		
Reform gain from Conservative				

Burntwood South
Party	Candidate	Votes	%	±%
Reform	Robin Hall	1,407	46.6	N/A
Labour	Darren Ennis	939	31.1	–14.2
Conservative	Antony Jones	529	17.5	–30.5
Liberal Democrats	Miles Trent	145	4.8	–1.9
Majority		468	15.5	N/A
Turnout		3,022	28.1	–1.4
Registered electors		10,762		
Reform gain from Conservative				

Lichfield City North
Party	Candidate	Votes	%	±%
Reform	Matthew Wallens	1,260	34.0	N/A
Labour	Kate Greening	941	25.4	–6.3
Conservative	Janice Silvester-Hall*	821	22.2	–20.0
Liberal Democrats	Jordan Lane	436	11.8	+0.6
Green	David Melhuish	247	6.7	–1.5
Majority		319	8.6	N/A
Turnout		3,714	31.9	+0.4
Registered electors		11,651		
Reform gain from Conservative				

Lichfield City South
Party	Candidate	Votes	%	±%
Conservative	Colin Greatorex*	1,109	29.1	–19.4
Reform	Martyn Baylay	1,002	26.3	N/A
Labour	Jacob Marshall	862	22.6	+1.1
Liberal Democrats	Jamie Christie	587	15.4	–1.9
Green	Jessica Kelly	255	6.7	–6.0
Majority		107	2.8	–24.2
Turnout		3,820	34.1	–3.0
Registered electors		11,200		
Conservative hold				

Lichfield Rural East
Party	Candidate	Votes	%	±%
Reform	Tracey Dougherty	1,197	38.8	N/A
Conservative	Alan White*	958	31.0	–36.3
Liberal Democrats	Andrew Rushton	575	18.6	+3.7
Labour	Jenny Mackintosh	357	11.6	–6.3
Majority		239	7.8	N/A
Turnout		3,102	35.4	+2.8
Registered electors		8,759		
Reform gain from Conservative				

Lichfield Rural North
Party	Candidate	Votes	%	±%
Conservative	Richard Holland	964	32.9	–26.0
Reform	John Madden	944	32.2	N/A
Labour	Ben Watkins	719	24.5	+5.0
Liberal Democrats	Morag Maclean	307	10.5	+4.2
Majority		20	0.7	–38.7
Turnout		2,942	33.9	–1.5
Registered electors		8,675		
Conservative hold		Swing	▼26.0	

Lichfield Rural South
Party	Candidate	Votes	%	±%
Conservative	Alex Farrell	1,825	42.4	–34.6
Reform	Sarah Beech	1,744	40.5	N/A
Labour	David Thompson	500	11.6	–4.2
Liberal Democrats	Phillip Bennion	232	5.4	–1.8
Majority		81	1.9	–59.3
Turnout		4,310	35.5	–1.6
Registered electors		12,143		
Conservative hold				

Lichfield Rural West
Party	Candidate	Votes	%	±%
Reform	Janet Higgins	1,586	42.1	N/A
Conservative	Richard Cox*	1,455	38.6	–35.2
Labour Co-op	Paul Taylor	397	10.5	–6.7
Green	David Cullen	184	4.9	N/A
Liberal Democrats	Ash Walters	146	3.9	–2.6
Majority		131	3.5	N/A
Turnout		3,770	34.6	+1.9
Registered electors		10,888		
Reform gain from Conservative				

=== Newcastle-under-Lyme ===
Newcastle-under-Lyme district summary
Party	Seats	+/-	Votes	%	+/-
Reform UK	8	▲8	13,053	44.7	+44.1
Conservative	1	▼8	7,316	25.2	–32.3
Labour	0	Steady	6,419	22.0	–9.7
Liberal Democrats	0	Steady	1,978	6.8	+2.0
Green	0	Steady	195	0.7	–4.6
Independent	0	Steady	133	0.5	N/A
TUSC	0	Steady	99	0.3	N/A
Total	9	Steady	29,193	31.5	
Registered electors			92,911	–	

Division results

Audley & Chesterton
Party	Candidate	Votes	%	±%
Reform	Rhys Machin	1,605	51.8	N/A
Labour Co-op	Rebekah Lewis	660	21.3	–13.7
Conservative	Jeremy Lefroy	503	16.2	–33.5
Liberal Democrats	Andrew Wemyss	331	10.7	+1.4
Majority		945	30.5	N/A
Turnout		3,113	29.5	+3.0
Registered electors		10,563		
Reform gain from Conservative				

Bradwell & Porthill
Party	Candidate	Votes	%
Reform	Nicholas Lakin	1,471	52.4
Labour	Andrew Fox-Hewett	734	26.2
Conservative	Qamar Khan	378	13.5
Liberal Democrats	Eric Durber	223	7.9
Majority		737	26.2
Turnout		2,819	30.1
Registered electors		9,365	
Reform win (new seat)			

Kidsgrove
Party	Candidate	Votes	%	±%
Reform	Tony Screen	1,878	53.6	N/A
Labour	Mark Porter	787	22.5	–6.0
Conservative	Conna Eynon	739	21.1	–42.9
TUSC	Rebecca Carter	99	2.8	+1.6
Majority		1,091	31.1	N/A
Turnout		3,516	31.3	+3.1
Registered electors		11,249		
Reform gain from Conservative				

May Bank & Wolstanton
Party	Candidate	Votes	%
Reform	Lynn Dean	1,142	35.4
Conservative	David Hutchinson	966	30.0
Labour	Mark Olszewski	797	24.7
Liberal Democrats	Hilary Jones	187	5.8
Independent	Duncan Greenwood	133	4.1
Majority		176	5.4
Turnout		3,230	32.0
Registered electors		10,095	
Reform win (new seat)			

Newcastle Rural
Party	Candidate	Votes	%	±%
Reform	Helen Arnold	1,497	39.8	+37.1
Conservative	Andrew Turnock	1,217	32.4	–33.4
Labour Co-op	Jeff Love	564	15.0	–3.3
Liberal Democrats	Anne Becket	284	7.6	+2.4
Green	Steven Jones	195	5.2	–2.9
Majority		280	7.4	N/A
Turnout		3,772	36.3	+0.8
Registered electors		10,384		
Reform gain from Conservative		Swing	▲33.3	

Newcastle South
Party	Candidate	Votes	%	±%
Reform	Adam Griffiths	1,238	38.6	N/A
Conservative	Gill Heesom	924	28.8	–27.7
Labour Co-op	Jacqueline Brown	810	25.2	–7.4
Liberal Democrats	Nigel Jones	236	7.4	+4.4
Majority		314	9.8	N/A
Turnout		3,223	31.4	–1.4
Registered electors		10,270		
Reform gain from Conservative				

Silverdale & Knutton
Party	Candidate	Votes	%
Reform	Mark Nixon	1,344	50.7
Labour Co-op	Dave Jones	720	27.2
Conservative	Finn Swain	368	13.9
Liberal Democrats	James Borg	218	8.2
Majority		624	23.5
Turnout		2,663	25.5
Registered electors		10,427	
Reform win (new seat)			

Talke & Red Street
Party	Candidate	Votes	%	±%
Reform	Martin Rogerson	1,971	57.5	N/A
Labour Co-op	Sarah Pickup	776	22.7	–17.7
Conservative	Ray Tait	464	13.5	–38.8
Liberal Democrats	Steven Maddock	215	6.3	+3.1
Majority		1,195	34.8	N/A
Turnout		3,437	30.6	+3.5
Registered electors		11,236		
Reform gain from Conservative				

Westlands, Thistleberry & Keele
Party	Candidate	Votes	%
Conservative	Simon Tagg*	1,757	49.9
Reform	Keith Parker	907	25.8
Labour	Joel Edgington-Plunkett	571	16.2
Liberal Democrats	Robin Studd	284	8.1
Majority		850	24.1
Turnout		3,528	37.8
Registered electors		9,322	
Conservative win (new seat)			

=== South Staffordshire ===
South Staffordshire district summary
Party	Seats	+/-	Votes	%	+/-
Reform UK	6	▲6	11,805	41.9	N/A
Conservative	2	▼6	9,733	34.5	–33.9
Labour	0	Steady	2,467	8.8	–8.3
Liberal Democrats	0	Steady	2,357	8.4	N/A
Green	0	Steady	1,250	4.4	–5.6
Independent	0	Steady	551	2.0	–0.4
UKIP	0	Steady	31	0.1	–2.0
Total	8	Steady	28,194	32.7	
Registered electors			86,369	–	

Division results

Brewood
Party	Candidate	Votes	%	±%
Reform	Chris Large	1,618	44.8	N/A
Conservative	Mark Sutton*	1,331	36.8	–37.6
Labour	Jan Jeffries	374	10.3	–5.6
Liberal Democrats	Mark Middleton	168	4.6	N/A
Green	Andrew Ballance	124	3.4	–6.3
Majority		287	8.0	N/A
Turnout		3,620	34.8	–0.3
Registered electors		10,396		
Reform gain from Conservative				

Cheslyn Hay Village, Featherstone & Shareshill
Party	Candidate	Votes	%
Reform	Thomas Baker	1,685	50.6
Conservative	Rob Duncan	1,020	30.6
Labour	John Brindle	409	12.3
Green	Gary Burnett	114	3.4
Liberal Democrats	Amanda Young	104	3.1
Majority		665	20.0
Turnout		3,340	30.8
Registered electors		10,835	
Reform win (new seat)			

Codsall
Party	Candidate	Votes	%	±%
Conservative	Val Chapman	1,317	40.9	–26.6
Reform	Matt Ewart	1,067	33.2	N/A
Green	Ian Sadler	281	8.7	–9.9
Liberal Democrats	Stuart Bailey	279	8.7	N/A
Labour	Kian Banks	250	7.8	–6.1
Independent	Sam Payne	24	0.7	N/A
Majority		250	7.7	–41.2
Turnout		3,221	31.6	–1.9
Registered electors		10,178		
Conservative hold				

Great Wyrley & Essington
Party	Candidate	Votes	%
Reform	Michelle Woods	1,679	49.6
Conservative	Peter Kruskonjic	1,068	31.6
Labour	Barbar Sigley	380	11.2
Green	Danni Braine	138	4.1
Liberal Democrats	Andrew Calloway	118	3.5
Majority		611	18.0
Turnout		3,387	28.8
Registered electors		11,763	
Reform win (new seat)			

Kinver
Party	Candidate	Votes	%	±%
Conservative	Victoria Wilson*	1,804	45.1	–29.4
Reform	Andrew Southall	1,483	37.1	N/A
Labour	Lorraine Holmes	294	7.3	–4.3
Liberal Democrats	Hannah Harper-Wallis	240	6.0	N/A
Green	Andi Mohr	150	3.7	–10.3
UKIP	Gordon Fanthom	31	0.8	N/A
Majority		321	8.0	–52.5
Turnout		4,011	37.3	+0.2
Registered electors		10,757		
Conservative hold				

Penkridge
Party	Candidate	Votes	%	±%
Reform	Craig Humphreyson	1,438	37.6	N/A
Liberal Democrats	Sam Harper-Wallis	1,216	31.8	N/A
Conservative	Wendy Sutton	859	22.5	–46.0
Labour	Andrew Lenz	212	5.5	–13.2
Green	Roger Powell	99	2.6	–10.2
Majority		222	5.8	N/A
Turnout		3,831	33.4	+4.3
Registered electors		11,459		
Reform gain from Conservative				

Perton
Party	Candidate	Votes	%	±%
Reform	James Hodges	1,084	35.2	N/A
Conservative	Siôn Charlesworth-Jones	1,031	33.5	–24.4
Independent	Nigel Caine	527	17.1	–6.7
Labour	Adam Freeman	205	6.7	–6.5
Green	Hilde Liesens	131	4.3	–0.8
Liberal Democrats	Robert Lickley	100	3.2	N/A
Majority		53	1.7	N/A
Turnout		3,080	32.0	–1.8
Registered electors		9,629		
Reform gain from Conservative				

Wombourne
Party	Candidate	Votes	%	±%
Reform	Marie Shortland	1,751	46.8	N/A
Conservative	Mike Davies*	1,303	34.8	–36.2
Labour Co-op	Adrian Hamlyn	343	9.2	–7.4
Green	Claire McIlvenna	213	5.7	–6.7
Liberal Democrats	Valerie Davis	132	3.5	N/A
Majority		448	12.0	N/A
Turnout		3,754	33.1	+1.7
Registered electors		11,352		
Reform gain from Conservative				

=== Stafford ===
Stafford district summary
Party	Seats	+/-	Votes	%	+/-
Reform UK	6	▲6	11,298	32.4	+32.1
Conservative	1	▼6	9,498	27.3	–24.8
Green	1	▲1	3,256	9.3	–1.5
Stafford Ind.	1	Steady	2,597	7.5	N/A
Labour	0	▼1	5,409	15.5	–7.9
Liberal Democrats	0	Steady	2,439	7.0	+6.0
Independent	0	Steady	303	0.9	–6.4
TUSC	0	Steady	39	0.1	–0.2
Total	9	Steady	34,839		

Division results

Eccleshall & Gnosall
Party	Candidate	Votes	%
Reform	Wayne Titley	1,584	34.9
Conservative	Jeremy Pert*	1,557	34.3
Green	Scott Spencer	863	19.0
Labour	Stewart Moffat	342	7.5
Liberal Democrats	Janet Crossley	187	4.1
Majority		27	0.6
Turnout		4,533	
Reform win (new seat)			

Stafford Central
Party	Candidate	Votes	%	±%
Reform	Paul Williams	1,080	33.8	N/A
Labour Co-op	Debbie Harrison	1,002	31.3	–12.0
Conservative	Paul Startin	598	18.7	–21.5
Green	Mike Spight	305	9.5	–2.5
Liberal Democrats	Sam Whitehouse	214	6.7	N/A
Majority		78	2.5	N/A
Turnout		3,199		
Reform gain from Labour Co-op				

Stafford North
Party	Candidate	Votes	%	±%
Reform	Chris Gilbert	1,058	31.4	N/A
Conservative	Mike Newton	1,011	30.0	–24.9
Labour Co-op	Ant Reid	793	23.6	–8.7
Green	Emma Carter	250	7.4	–1.3
Liberal Democrats	Eleanor Anders	216	6.4	N/A
TUSC	Allan Gray	39	1.2	–0.7
Majority		47	1.4	N/A
Turnout		3,367		
Reform gain from Conservative				

Stafford South East
Party	Candidate	Votes	%	±%
Conservative	Ann Edgeller*	2,137	45.1	–17.1
Reform	Ray Barron	1,322	28.1	N/A
Labour	Alison Breakwell	869	18.3	–10.4
Green	Victoria Door	258	5.4	–2.2
Liberal Democrats	Toby Webster	144	3.0	N/A
Majority		815	17.0	–16.5
Turnout		4,740		
Conservative hold				

Stafford South West
Party	Candidate	Votes	%
Reform	Antonia Orlandi-Fantini	1,189	37.4
Labour Co-op	Aaron Thurstance	832	26.2
Conservative	Roy Clarke	679	21.3
Green	Roisin Chambers	283	8.9
Liberal Democrats	Maria Moore	198	6.2
Majority		357	11.2
Turnout		3,181	
Reform win (new seat)			

Stafford Trent Valley
Party	Candidate	Votes	%	±%
Reform	Andrew Mynors	1,273	30.6	N/A
Conservative	Jonathan Price*	1,252	30.1	–18.0
Stafford Ind.	Brendan McKeown	1,008	24.3	–3.8
Labour	Trudie McGuinness	421	10.1	–6.3
Liberal Democrats	Peter Voss	202	4.9	N/A
Majority		21	0.5	N/A
Turnout		4,156		
Reform gain from Conservative				

Stafford West & Rural
Party	Candidate	Votes	%
Green	Jack Rose	1,297	34.8
Reform	Paul Gilbert	1,116	30.0
Conservative	Mark Winnington*	884	23.7
Labour	Leah Elston-Thompson	320	8.6
Liberal Democrats	Edward Foreman	106	2.8
Majority		181	4.8
Turnout		3,723	
Green win (new seat)			

Stone Rural North
Party	Candidate	Votes	%	±%
Reform	Sean Bagguley	1,461	34.6	+31.4
Liberal Democrats	Alec Sandiford	1,172	27.7	+18.2
Conservative	Ian Parry*	930	22.0	–34.5
Labour	Sharon Reid	360	8.5	–6.9
Independent	Gary Lloyd	303	7.2	N/A
Majority		289	6.9	N/A
Turnout		4,226		
Reform gain from Conservative		Swing	▲6.6	

Stone Urban
Party	Candidate	Votes	%	±%
Stafford Ind.	Jill Hood*	1,589	42.4	–5.4
Reform	Jordan Turnock	1,215	32.5	N/A
Conservative	Darren Woodward	470	12.6	–21.7
Labour	Polly Sutherland	470	12.6	–2.4
Majority		374	9.9	–3.6
Turnout		3,744		
Stafford Ind. hold				

=== Staffordshire Moorlands ===
Staffordshire Moorlands district summary
Party	Seats	+/-	Votes	%	+/-
Reform UK	7	▲7	11,810	40.3	N/A
Conservative	0	▼6	8,727	29.8	–26.7
Labour	0	▼1	3,749	12.8	–17.2
Independent	0	Steady	2,649	9.0	+3.6
Green	0	Steady	1,590	5.4	–0.4
Liberal Democrats	0	Steady	809	2.8	+0.4
Total	7	Steady	29,334	38.1	
Registered electors			77,056	–	

Division results

Biddulph North
Party	Candidate	Votes	%	±%
Reform	Mike Broom	1,404	38.9	N/A
Conservative	Derek Stubbs	954	26.4	–31.2
Independent	Jim Garvey	834	23.1	N/A
Labour	Sharon Fox	295	8.2	–27.5
Green	Ian Waite	122	3.4	–3.3
Majority		450	12.5	N/A
Turnout		3,629	37.6	+5.7
Registered electors		9,645		
Reform gain from Conservative				

Biddulph South & Endon
Party	Candidate	Votes	%	±%
Reform	Bob Egginton	1,824	42.4	N/A
Conservative	Keith Flunder*	1,369	31.8	–26.1
Labour	Gareth Taylor	548	12.7	–15.4
Liberal Democrats	Christina Jebb	420	9.8	–3.2
Green	Alison McCrea	138	3.2	N/A
Majority		455	10.6	N/A
Turnout		4,305	36.2	+8.4
Registered electors		11,886		
Reform gain from Conservative				

Caverswall
Party	Candidate	Votes	%	±%
Reform	Warwick McKenzie	1,711	42.4	N/A
Conservative	Ross Ward*	1,539	38.1	–33.3
Labour	Matthew Spooner	306	7.6	–12.5
Independent	Caroline Lovatt	226	5.6	N/A
Green	Helen Stead	133	3.3	–5.2
Liberal Democrats	Judith Gregg	120	3.0	N/A
Majority		172	4.3	N/A
Turnout		4,039	36.9	+8.1
Registered electors		10,941		
Reform gain from Conservative				

Cheadle & Checkley
Party	Candidate	Votes	%	±%
Reform	Gary Bentley	1,650	38.2	N/A
Conservative	Mark Deaville*	1,448	33.5	–19.4
Independent	Peter Wilkinson	547	12.6	–10.0
Labour Co-op	Vicky Wheeldon	490	11.3	–7.7
Green	James Firkins	190	4.4	–1.2
Majority		202	4.7	N/A
Turnout		4,333	38.5	+8.9
Registered electors		11,243		
Reform gain from Conservative				

Churnet Valley
Party	Candidate	Votes	%	±%
Reform	Su Beardmore	1,882	46.4	N/A
Conservative	Mike Worthington*	1,133	27.9	–35.2
Labour	John Gill	439	10.8	–15.3
Green	Mike Jones	244	6.0	–4.8
Independent	Ian Plant	205	5.0	N/A
Liberal Democrats	Roy Gregg	157	3.9	N/A
Majority		749	18.5	N/A
Turnout		4,065	36.8	+5.4
Registered electors		11,034		
Reform gain from Conservative				

Leek Rural
Party	Candidate	Votes	%	±%
Reform	Charlotte Kelly	1,887	42.1	N/A
Conservative	Iain Banks	965	21.5	–35.4
Independent	Linda Malyon	786	17.5	N/A
Green	Jonathan Kempster	554	12.4	+4.2
Labour	Sheree Peaple	287	6.4	–15.3
Majority		922	20.6	N/A
Turnout		4,484	41.8	+6.6
Registered electors		10,728		
Reform gain from Conservative				

Leek South
Party	Candidate	Votes	%	±%
Reform	Sonny Edwards	1,452	32.1	N/A
Labour Co-op	Charlotte Atkins*	1,384	30.6	–26.8
Conservative	Joe Porter	1,319	29.1	–8.9
Green	Judith Rutnam	209	4.6	N/A
Liberal Democrats	Christopher Rank	112	2.5	–2.1
Independent	Roy Molson	51	1.1	N/A
Majority		68	1.5	N/A
Turnout		4,534	39.2	+5.8
Registered electors		11,579		
Reform gain from Labour Co-op				

=== Tamworth ===
Tamworth district summary
Party	Seats	+/-	Votes	%	+/-
Reform UK	5	▲5	9,607	49.5	N/A
Conservative	0	▼6	4,415	22.8	–34.4
Labour	0	Steady	3,427	17.7	–12.3
Independent	0	Steady	1,021	5.3	–0.3
Green	0	Steady	625	3.2	+1.3
UKIP	0	Steady	255	1.3	–4.0
Workers Party	0	Steady	56	0.3	N/A
Total	5	▼1	19,406	32.2	
Registered electors			60,480	–	

Division results

Perrycrofts
Party	Candidate	Votes	%	±%
Reform	Ian Cooper	1,517	34.9	N/A
Conservative	Robert Pritchard*	1,037	23.8	–21.5
Independent	Richard Kingstone	1,021	23.5	–3.5
Labour	Gareth Coates	588	13.5	–10.5
Green	Owxn Smith	160	3.7	N/A
UKIP	Lisa Morris	27	0.6	–2.2
Majority		480	11.1	N/A
Turnout		4,352	36.6	+1.0
Registered electors		11,888		
Reform gain from Conservative				

The Cotes/Two Rivers
Party	Candidate	Votes	%
Reform	Nicholas Thompson	1,972	50.4
Labour	Carol Dean	806	20.6
Conservative	James Barron	788	20.1
Green	Zoot Roome	232	5.9
UKIP	Gail Bilcliff	57	1.5
Workers Party	Adam Goodfellow	56	1.4
Majority		1,166	29.8
Turnout		3,919	31.5
Registered electors		12,435	
Reform win (new seat)			

The Heaths
Party	Candidate	Votes	%
Reform	Hayley Coles	2,020	55.2
Conservative	Brett Beetham	746	20.4
Labour Co-op	Chris Bains	595	16.3
Green	Emily Walker	233	6.4
UKIP	Tony Fergus	65	1.5
Majority		1,274	34.8
Turnout		3,673	31.2
Registered electors		11,775	
Reform win (new seat)			

Watling
Party	Candidate	Votes	%
Reform	Wayne Luca	2,164	55.9
Conservative	Jeremy Oates*	1,004	25.9
Labour	Ben Clarke	702	18.1
Majority		1,160	30.0
Turnout		3,897	31.5
Registered electors		12,369	
Reform win (new seat)			

Wilnecote
Party	Candidate	Votes	%
Reform	Gordon Munro	1,934	53.5
Conservative	Tina Clements*	840	23.2
Labour	Margaret Clarke	736	20.4
UKIP	Robert Bilcliff	106	2.9
Majority		1,094	30.3
Turnout		3,634	30.3
Registered electors		12,013	
Reform win (new seat)			

== By-elections ==
=== Eccleshall & Gnosall ===
A by-election was held on 17 July 2025 after the resignation of Reform councillor, Wayne Titley. Titley resigned just 2 weeks after his election.

Eccleshall & Gnosall by-election: 17 July 2025
Party	Candidate	Votes	%	±%
Conservative	Jeremy Pert	1,689	44.4	+10.1
Green	Scott Spencer	1,037	27.3	+8.3
Reform	Ray Barron	938	24.7	–10.2
Labour	Leah Elston-Thompson	140	3.7	–3.8
Majority		652	17.1	N/A
Turnout		3,804	34.8	
Registered electors		~10,931		
Conservative gain from Reform		Swing	▲0.9	

=== Brewood ===
Brewood by-election: 17 December 2026
Party	Candidate	Votes	%	±%
Labour	Jan Jeffries			
Liberal Democrats	Mark Middleton			
Conservative	Mark Sutton			
Reform	Jordan Turnock			
Majority				
Turnout				
		Swing		

== See also ==
- Staffordshire County Council elections
