= 2005 Staffordshire County Council election =

2005 UK local government election

| ← 2001 | 5 May 2005 | 2009 → |

All 62 seats to Staffordshire County Council 32 seats needed for a majority
| | First party | Second party |
|---|---|---|
| Party | Labour | Conservative |
| Seats won | 32 | 28 |
| Seat change | ▼4 | ▲4 |
| | Third party |
| Party | Liberal Democrats |
| Seats won | 2 |
| Seat change | Steady |
- 2005 local election results in Staffordshire
Council control before election
Labour
Council control after election
Labour

Elections to Staffordshire County Council took place on 5 May 2005, the same day as the general election. All 62 seats were up for election.

== Summary ==
The election was won by the Labour Party, with 32 seats.

== Overall results ==
Staffordshire County Council election, 2005
| Party | Seats | Gains | Losses | Net gain/loss | Seats % | Votes % | Votes | +/− |
|---|---|---|---|---|---|---|---|---|
| Labour | 32 | | | -4 | 52% | 38% | | |
| Conservative | 28 | | | +4 | 45% | 38% | | |
| Liberal Democrats | 2 | | | 0 | 3% | 20% | | |
| UKIP | 0 | | | 0 | 0% | 1% | | |
| Independent | 0 | | | 0 | 0% | <1% | | |
| Freedom (UK) | 0 | | | 0 | 0% | <1% | | |
| Ratepayers (SM) | 0 | | | 0 | 0% | <1% | | |
| Green | 0 | | | 0 | 0% | <1% | | |
