= 2013 Staffordshire County Council election =

UK local elections

← 2009	2 May 2013	2017 →

All 62 seats to Staffordshire County Council 32 seats needed for a majority
	First party	Second party	Third party
Party	Conservative	Labour	UKIP
Seats won	34	24	2
Seat change	▼15	▲21	▼2
- Map showing the results of the 2013 Staffordshire County Council elections.
Council control before election
Conservative
Council control after election
Conservative

An election to Staffordshire County Council took place on 2 May 2013 as part of the 2013 United Kingdom local elections. 62 electoral divisions returned one county councillor each by first-past-the-post voting for a four-year term of office. Following a boundary review, new electoral division boundaries were established for this election. No elections were held in Stoke-on-Trent, which is a unitary authority outside the area covered by the County Council. The council continues to be administered on the Leader and Cabinet model.

All locally registered electors (British, Irish, Commonwealth and European Union citizens) who were aged 18 or over on Thursday 2 May 2013 were entitled to vote in the local elections. Those who were temporarily away from their ordinary address (for example, away working, on holiday, in student accommodation or in hospital) were also entitled to vote in the local elections, although those who had moved abroad and registered as overseas electors cannot vote in the local elections. It is possible to register to vote at more than one address (such as a university student who had a term-time address and lives at home during holidays) at the discretion of the local Electoral Register Office, but it remains an offence to vote more than once in the same local government election.

== Summary ==
The election was won by the Conservative Party with 34 seats, despite the loss of 15 seats resulting in a narrow majority of just two councillors. Labour won 24 seats, a net gain of 21. All four Liberal Democrats lost their seats, in each case to a Labour candidate. (Note: Some division boundaries are approximate comparisons due to boundary changes, particularly the city of Newcastle-under-Lyme where most divisions were reconfigured. The Kidsgrove and Talke division in 2009 elected two members: one UKIP and a Liberal Democrat. The successor divisions for 2013 (Talke & Red Street and Kidsgrove) were won by Labour party candidates.) Despite an increase in share of the vote across the county to 24%, the number of UKIP councillors elected bucked the national trend with a net loss of two seats. Two independent candidates won seats, with one holding the Caverswall division and the other gaining a seat from the Conservative Party.

== Results ==
Staffordshire County Council election, 2013
Party	Seats	Gains	Losses	Net gain/loss	Seats %	Votes %	Votes	+/−
Conservative	34			-15				
Labour	24			+21				
UKIP	2	+2	-4	-2				
Independent	2	-1	+1	0				
Liberal Democrats	0			-4				
