= 2021 Staffordshire County Council election =

Staffordshire County Council election

- 6 May 2021

All 62 seats to Staffordshire County Council 32 seats needed for a majority
	First party	Second party
Party	Conservative	Labour
Last election	51 seats, 53%	10 seats, 30%
Seats won	57	4
Seat change	▲6	▼6
Popular vote	125,649	58,225
Percentage	56.6%	26.2%
Swing	▲2.8%	▼1.7
- Map showing the results of the 2021 Staffordshire County Council elections.
Council control before election
Conservative
Council control after election
Conservative

Elections to Staffordshire County Council took place on 6 May 2021 on the same day as district council elections in Cannock Chase and Tamworth and other local elections in England. All of the council's divisions were up for election, meaning a total of 62 councillors were elected.

The result was a second consecutive landslide victory for the Conservative Party which increased its majority on the council from 51 seats in 2017 up to 57 seats, out of a possible 62. The Labour Party lost six of its ten seats which was the party's worst result since the 2009 election when it had been left with three seats; Labour was left without any representation in five of the county's eight districts and boroughs. The remaining seat was won by an independent candidate who held her Stone Urban seat.

== Background ==
The Conservative Party had held a majority of seats in Staffordshire County Council since 2009 when it had ended 28 consecutive years of Labour control. The most recent election in Staffordshire had been the 2019 general election, in which all twelve Staffordshire constituencies were won by the Conservatives. The Conservatives were aiming to repeat the success of their general election victory and gain divisions formerly regarded as safe territory for Labour. Labour meanwhile were hoping to retain their ten seats and regain some ground lost to the Conservatives at the 2017 election. Smaller parties, including the Liberal Democrats and Green Party were targeting specific divisions in the hope of making inroads into areas held by the main parties. Reform UK, the Trade Unionist and Socialist Coalition and the Heritage Party fielded candidates for the first time at a Staffordshire County Council election, as did a new localist party founded in 2020, the Chase Community Independents Group.

== Summary ==
=== Election result ===
2021 Staffordshire County Council election
Party	Candidates	Seats	Gains	Losses	Net gain/loss	Seats %	Votes %	Votes	+/−
Conservative	62	57	6	0	▲6	91.9	56.6	125,649	+2.8
Labour	62	4	0	6	▼6	6.5	26.2	58,225	–1.7
Independent	18	1	0	0	Steady	1.6	4.1	9,059	+1.6
Green	48	0	0	0	Steady	0.0	6.4	14,198	+1.2
Chase Community Independents Group	5	0	0	0	Steady	0.0	2.8	6,192	N/A
Liberal Democrats	24	0	0	0	Steady	0.0	2.7	5,949	–1.9
UKIP	14	0	0	0	Steady	0.0	1.0	2,171	–5.0
Reform	4	0	0	0	Steady	0.0	0.1	421	N/A
TUSC	5	0	0	0	Steady	0.0	0.1	253	N/A
Heritage	1	0	0	0	Steady	0.0	<0.1	55	N/A

=== Council composition ===
Prior to the election, the composition of the council was:

↓
51	10	1
Conservative	Labour	Ind

After the election, the composition of the council was:

↓
57	4	1
Conservative	Labour	Ind

== Division results ==
Results for individual divisions are shown below. They have been divided into their respective districts or boroughs and listed alphabetically. Vote share changes are based on the results achieved by parties in 2017 election when these seats were last contested.

=== District of Cannock Chase ===
(7 seats, 6 electoral divisions)

Cannock Chase District summary result
Party	Seats	Gains	Losses	Net gain/loss	Seats %	Votes %	Votes	+/−
Conservative	7	2	0	▲2	100.0	50.0	14,464	▲8.7
Labour	0	0	2	▼2	0.0	26.4	7,634	▼5.3
Chase Indies	0	0	0	N/A	0.0	17.3	4,997	N/A
Green	0	0	0	0	0.0	3.1	882	▼10.3
Liberal Democrats	0	0	0	0	0.0	1.9	547	▼1.2
Independent	0	0	0	0	0.0	0.6	162	▼0.9
Reform	0	0	0	N/A	0.0	0.4	117	N/A
TUSC	0	0	0	N/A	0.0	0.3	97	N/A

Brereton and Ravenhill
Party	Candidate	Votes	%	±%
Conservative	Peter Kruskonjic	1,111	40.6	▲8.4
Labour	Alan Dudson	942	34.4	▼1.7
Liberal Democrats	Gerald Molineux	547	20.0	▼3.7
Green	David Green	138	5.0	N/A
Majority		169	6.2	N/A
Turnout		2,762	28.5	▲0.9
Conservative gain from Labour		Swing	▲5.1	

Cannock Town Centre
Party	Candidate	Votes	%	±%
Conservative	Paul Snape	2,295	61.8	▲6.8
Labour	Benjamin Watkins	797	21.5	▼10.4
Chase Indies	Sarah Findlay	413	11.1	N/A
Green	Matthew Jackson	206	5.6	▲1.0
Majority		1,498	40.3	▲17.2
Turnout		3,737	31.4	0.0
Conservative hold		Swing	▲8.6	

Cannock Villages
Party	Candidate	Votes	%	±%
Conservative	Samantha Thompson	1,734	54.2	▲5.0
Labour	Diane Todd	1,015	31.7	▼3.7
Chase Indies	Andrea Layton	220	6.9	N/A
Reform	Paul Allen	117	3.7	N/A
Green	Ken Beardmore	116	3.6	▼0.2
Majority		719	22.5	▲8.7
Turnout		3,231	28.9	▲1.4
Conservative hold		Swing	▲4.4	

Chadsmoor
Party	Candidate	Votes	%	±%
Conservative	Philippa Haden	1,347	48.9	▲18.5
Labour Co-op	Christine Mitchell	1,186	43.0	▼7.7
Green	Jordan Morris	223	8.1	▲3.5
Majority		161	5.9	N/A
Turnout		2,780	25.9	▼1.0
Conservative gain from Labour		Swing	▲13.1	

Etchinghill and Heath
Party	Candidate	Votes	%	±%
Conservative	Mike Sutherland	2,024	65.8	▲8.7
Labour	David Gaye	851	27.7	▲3.5
Green	Warren Cocker	199	6.5	▲4.0
Majority		1,173	38.1	▲5.2
Turnout		3,103	33.3	▲3.4
Conservative hold		Swing	▲2.6	

Hednesford and Rawnsley
Party	Candidate	Votes	%	±%
Conservative	Phil Hewitt	3,326	46.3	▲12.3
Conservative	Johnny McMahon	2,627	36.6	▼1.4
Chase Indies	Paul Dadge	2,332	32.5	N/A
Chase Indies	Emma Hunnyball	2,032	28.3	N/A
Labour	Paula Stanton	1,452	20.2	▼8.8
Labour	Ryan Tipton	1,391	19.4	▼5.6
Independent	Ronald Turville	162	2.3	▲0.3
TUSC	Dave Ireland	97	1.4	N/A
Turnout		7,183	29.9	▼0.2
Conservative hold		Swing		
Conservative hold		Swing		

Division Summary
Party	Votes	% Votes	±%	Seats	Change
Conservative	5,953	44.4	▲7.8	2	
Chase Indies	4,364	32.5	N/A	0	
Labour	2,843	21.2	▼6.3	0	
Independent	162	1.2	▼0.1	0	
TUSC	97	0.7	N/A	0	
Total Votes Cast	13,419				

=== Borough of East Staffordshire ===
The Main issue in East Staffordshire was a plan to demolish Burton Library and put it into the Burton Market Hall

(8 seats, 8 electoral divisions)

East Staffordshire Borough summary result
Party	Seats	Gains	Losses	Net gain/loss	Seats %	Votes %	Votes	+/−
Conservative	6	0	0	0	75.0	52.1	14,440	▼6.0
Labour	2	0	0	0	25.0	29.0	8,028	▼0.8
Independent	0	0	0	0	0.0	10.2	2,818	N/A
Green	0	0	0	0	0.0	6.9	1,899	▲4.9
Liberal Democrats	0	0	0	0	0.0	1.9	529	▼0.6

Burton Tower
Party	Candidate	Votes	%	±%
Conservative	Conor Wileman	2,057	58.9	▼3.1
Labour	Thomas Hadley	756	21.7	▼6.0
Independent	Terence Smith	486	13.9	N/A
Green	Carol Sharratt	191	5.5	▲1.1
Majority		1,301	37.2	▲2.9
Turnout		3,509		
Conservative hold		Swing	▲1.5	

Burton Town
Party	Candidate	Votes	%	±%
Labour	Arshad Afsar	1,474	49.6	▲7.0
Conservative	Colin Wileman	877	29.5	▼5.5
Liberal Democrats	Helen Hall	256	8.6	▼3.1
Independent	Becky Talbot	227	7.6	N/A
Green	Simon Hales	135	4.5	▲1.9
Majority		597	20.1	▲12.4
Turnout		3,003		
Labour hold		Swing	▲6.3	

Burton Trent
Party	Candidate	Votes	%	±%
Labour	Syed Hussain	1,603	58.9	▲2.5
Conservative	Becky Brady	896	32.9	▲7.9
Liberal Democrats	Theodore Hollier	91	3.3	N/A
Green	Maire Smith	83	3.0	N/A
Independent	Jaimie Hanyia	49	1.8	N/A
Majority		707	26.0	▼5.4
Turnout		2,744		
Labour hold		Swing	▼2.7	

Dove
Party	Candidate	Votes	%	±%
Conservative	Philip White	2,403	58.3	▼4.8
Labour Co-op	Lewis Anderson	1,344	32.6	▲5.0
Green	Lynn Furber	221	5.4	N/A
Independent	Karen Baldwin	151	3.7	N/A
Majority		1,059	25.7	▼9.8
Turnout		4,138		
Conservative hold		Swing	▼4.9	

Horninglow and Stretton
Party	Candidate	Votes	%	±%
Conservative	Bernard Peters	1,654	51.0	▼2.0
Labour Co-op	Shelagh McKiernan	854	26.3	▼4.3
Independent	Deneice Florence-Jukes	623	19.2	N/A
Green	Robert Sharratt	115	3.5	▲1.5
Majority		800	24.7	▲2.3
Turnout		3,270		
Conservative hold		Swing	▲1.2	

Needwood Forest
Party	Candidate	Votes	%	±%
Conservative	Julia Jessel	2,589	67.4	▼5.0
Labour	Michael Huckerby	790	20.6	▼0.5
Green	Kelly Rickard	278	7.2	▲0.8
Liberal Democrats	Alasdair Brooks	182	4.7	N/A
Majority		1,799	46.8	▼4.5
Turnout		2,744		
Conservative hold		Swing	▼2.3	

Uttoxeter Rural
Party	Candidate	Votes	%	±%
Conservative	Philip Atkins	2,942	72.8	▼6.3
Labour	Paul Walker	531	13.1	▼0.7
Green	Olly Ragg	329	8.1	N/A
Independent	Edward Rodway-Bowden	239	5.9	N/A
Majority		2,411	59.7	▼5.6
Turnout		4,062		
Conservative hold		Swing	▼2.8	

Uttoxeter Town
Party	Candidate	Votes	%	±%
Conservative	Philip Hudson	1,022	31.1	▼29.0
Independent	David Brookes ^	731	22.2	N/A
Labour Co-op	John McKiernan	676	20.6	▼0.7
Green	Kate Copeland	547	16.6	N/A
Independent	Richard Grosvenor	312	9.5	N/A
Majority		291	8.9	▼22.0
Turnout		3,301		
Conservative hold		Swing	▼25.6	

^ David Brookes was the sitting councillor for the Uttoxeter Town division and previously left the Conservative Party to become an independent.

=== District of Lichfield ===
(8 seats, 8 electoral divisions)

Lichfield District summary result
Party	Seats	Gains	Losses	Net gain/loss	Seats %	Votes %	Votes	+/−
Conservative	8	1	0	▲1	100.0	58.4	15,928	▼1.4
Labour	0	0	1	▼1	0.0	26.2	7,133	▲2.9
Liberal Democrats	0	0	0	0	0.0	9.4	2,561	▲0.3
Green	0	0	0	0	0.0	4.2	1,137	▼1.1
Independent	0	0	0	0	0.0	1.5	425	▲0.8
UKIP	0	0	0	0	0.0	0.3	87	▼1.5

Burntwood North
Party	Candidate	Votes	%	±%
Conservative	Tom Loughbrough Rudd	1,450	49.0	▲4.1
Labour Co-op	Sue Woodward	1,415	47.8	▲1.2
Liberal Democrats	Jamie Christie	97	3.3	N/A
Majority		35	1.2	N/A
Turnout		2,971	30.1	0.0
Conservative gain from Labour Co-op		Swing	▲1.5	

Burntwood South
Party	Candidate	Votes	%	±%
Conservative	Mike Wilcox	1,419	48.0	▼5.4
Labour	Darren Ennis	1,335	45.3	▲15.2
Liberal Democrats	John Taylor	199	6.7	▲2.7
Majority		84	4.7	▼18.6
Turnout		2,976	29.5	▼0.2
Conservative hold		Swing	▼10.3	

Lichfield City North
Party	Candidate	Votes	%	±%
Conservative	Janice Silvester-Hall	1,391	42.2	▼3.9
Labour	Kathy Coe	1,047	31.7	▲0.1
Liberal Democrats	Miles Trent	370	11.2	▼1.1
Green	Stephen Sanders	269	8.2	▲3.4
Independent	Christopher Wilkinson	143	4.3	N/A
Independent	John Madden	80	2.4	N/A
Majority		344	10.5	▼4.0
Turnout		3,333	31.5	▼1.7
Conservative hold		Swing	▼2.0	

Lichfield City South
Party	Candidate	Votes	%	±%
Conservative	Colin Greatorex	1,936	48.5	▼7.8
Labour	Ann Hughes	857	21.5	▲3.8
Liberal Democrats	Hugh Ashton	691	17.3	▼1.0
Green	Paul Ecclestone-Brown	508	12.7	▲5.1
Majority		1,079	27.0	▼11.0
Turnout		4,026	37.1	▲3.4
Conservative hold		Swing	▼5.8	

Lichfield Rural East
Party	Candidate	Votes	%	±%
Conservative	Alan White	2,196	67.3	▲3.9
Labour	Lorna McGinty	583	17.9	▲0.7
Liberal Democrats	Phil Bennion	485	14.9	▲3.8
Majority		1,613	49.4	▲3.2
Turnout		3,295	32.6	▼1.0
Conservative hold		Swing	▲1.6	

Lichfield Rural North
Party	Candidate	Votes	%	±%
Conservative	Jan Eagland	2,153	58.9	▼8.9
Labour	David Whatton	712	19.5	▲4.4
Green	Simon Partridge	360	9.8	▲4.6
Liberal Democrats	Paul McDermott	229	6.3	▼5.6
Independent	Peter Longman	202	5.5	N/A
Majority		1,441	39.4	▼13.3
Turnout		3,687	35.4	▼0.1
Conservative hold		Swing	▼6.7	

Lichfield Rural South
Party	Candidate	Votes	%	±%
Conservative	David Smith	2,754	77.0	▲3.1
Labour	Brad Westwood	566	15.8	▲1.1
Liberal Democrats	John Smith	258	7.2	▲0.5
Majority		2,188	61.2	▲2.0
Turnout		3,598	37.1	▲2.2
Conservative hold		Swing	▲1.0	

Lichfield Rural West
Party	Candidate	Votes	%	±%
Conservative	Richard Cox	2,629	73.8	▲3.3
Labour	Mark Pritchard	614	17.2	0.0
Liberal Democrats	Fiona Robertson	232	6.5	▲0.3
UKIP	Janet Higgins	87	2.4	N/A
Majority		2,015	56.6	▲3.3
Turnout		3,587	32.7	▲2.2
Conservative hold		Swing	▲1.7	

=== Borough of Newcastle-under-Lyme ===
(9 seats, 9 electoral divisions)

Newcastle-under-Lyme Borough summary result
Party	Seats	Gains	Losses	Net gain/loss	Seats %	Votes %	Votes	+/−
Conservative	9	3	0	▲3	100.0	57.4	16,267	▲12.8
Labour	0	0	3	▼3	0.0	31.7	8,980	▼2.7
Green	0	0	0	0	0.0	5.3	1,494	▲4.5
Liberal Democrats	0	0	0	0	0.0	4.8	1,374	▼5.7
Reform	0	0	0	0	0.0	0.6	183	N/A
TUSC	0	0	0	0	0.0	0.2	50	N/A

Audley and Chesterton
Party	Candidate	Votes	%	±%
Conservative	Ian Wilkes	1,472	49.7	▲22.7
Labour	Ann Beech	1,038	35.0	▼3.5
Liberal Democrats	Andrew Wemyss	277	9.3	▼13.9
Green	Marie Powell	176	5.9	N/A
Majority		434	14.7	N/A
Turnout		2,992	26.5	▼1.5
Conservative gain from Labour		Swing	▲13.1	

Bradwell, Porthill and Wolstanton
Party	Candidate	Votes	%	±%
Conservative	Graham Hutton	1,631	52.9	▲4.3
Labour	Andrew Fox-Hewitt	1,243	40.3	▼6.9
Green	Leon Hughes	138	4.5	N/A
Liberal Democrats	Aidan Jenkins	70	2.3	▼2.0
Majority		388	12.6	▲11.2
Turnout		3,108	28.4	▼0.2
Conservative hold		Swing	▲5.6	

Keele, Knutton and Silverdale
Party	Candidate	Votes	%	±%
Conservative	Derrick Huckfield	1,179	56.5	▲29.3
Labour Co-op	Dave Jones	644	30.9	▼21.1
Liberal Democrats	James Borg	134	6.4	▲0.4
Green	Nikki Brough	116	5.6	▲2.7
TUSC	Cait Mallon	13	0.6	N/A
Majority		535	25.6	N/A
Turnout		2,100	27.8	▲2.0
Conservative gain from Labour Co-op		Swing	▲25.2	

Kidsgrove
Party	Candidate	Votes	%	±%
Conservative	Gill Burnett	1,938	64.0	▲29.2
Labour Co-op	Mike Stubbs	864	28.5	▼3.3
Green	Adam Colclough	109	3.6	N/A
Liberal Democrats	Katharine Mitchell	79	2.6	N/A
TUSC	Becky Carter	37	1.2	N/A
Majority		1,074	35.5	▲32.5
Turnout		3,050	28.2	▲0.6
Conservative hold		Swing	▲16.3	

May Bank and Cross Heath
Party	Candidate	Votes	%	±%
Conservative	James Salisbury	1,661	49.8	▲4.2
Labour	Mark Olszewski	1,345	40.4	▼1.4
Green	George Jones	203	6.1	N/A
Liberal Democrats	Morgan-Ross Inwood	124	3.7	▼0.5
Majority		316	9.4	▲5.6
Turnout		3,352	30.2	▼1.8
Conservative hold		Swing	▲2.8	

Newcastle Rural
Party	Candidate	Votes	%	±%
Conservative	Paul Northcott	2,348	65.8	▼7.5
Labour	Jeff Love	652	18.3	N/A
Green	Steve Jones	288	8.1	N/A
Liberal Democrats	Hilary Jones	184	5.2	▼15.0
Reform	Richard Woodward	98	2.7	N/A
Majority		1,696	47.5	▼5.6
Turnout		3,586	35.5	▲3.3
Conservative hold		Swing	▼12.9	

Newcastle South
Party	Candidate	Votes	%	±%
Conservative	Stephen Sweeney	1,958	56.5	▲5.6
Labour Co-op	Steph Talbot	1,129	32.6	▼3.2
Green	Rosy Powell	191	5.5	▲3.0
Liberal Democrats	Salwa Booth	103	3.0	▼0.9
Reform	Gary Fedtschyschak	85	2.5	N/A
Majority		829	23.9	▲8.8
Turnout		3,488	32.8	▼1.8
Conservative hold		Swing	▼4.4	

Talke and Red Street
Party	Candidate	Votes	%	±%
Conservative	Jill Waring	1,578	52.3	▲20.2
Labour Co-op	Sylvia Dymond	1,221	40.4	▼14.8
Green	Will Wood	124	4.1	N/A
Liberal Democrats	Richard Whelan	96	3.2	▼1.0
Majority		357	11.9	N/A
Turnout		3,039	27.1	▼1.8
Conservative gain from Labour Co-op		Swing	▲17.5	

Westlands and Thistleberry
Party	Candidate	Votes	%	±%
Conservative	Simon Tagg	2,502	65.8	▲14.0
Labour Co-op	Sue Moffat	844	22.2	▲5.3
Liberal Democrats	Peter Andras	307	8.1	▼16.9
Green	Jade Taylor	149	3.9	▲1.7
Majority		1,658	43.6	▲16.8
Turnout		3,824	39.1	▼0.3
Conservative hold		Swing	▲4.4	

=== District of South Staffordshire ===
(8 seats, 7 electoral divisions)

South Staffordshire District summary result
Party	Seats	Gains	Losses	Net gain/loss	Seats %	Votes %	Votes	+/−
Conservative	8	0	0	0	100.0	68.4	22,174	▲1.5
Labour	0	0	0	0	0.0	17.1	5,534	▼2.0
Green	0	0	0	0	0.0	10.0	3,248	▲4.1
UKIP	0	0	0	0	0.0	2.1	683	▼3.8
Independent	0	0	0	0	0.0	2.4	785	▲0.1

Brewood
Party	Candidate	Votes	%	±%
Conservative	Mark Sutton	2,649	74.4	▲3.1
Labour	Andrew Lenz	566	15.9	▼1.2
Green	Holly Fuller	344	9.7	▲5.6
Majority		2,083	58.5	▲4.3
Turnout		3,592	35.1	▲2.4
Conservative hold		Swing	▲2.2	

Cheslyn Hay, Essington and Great Wyrley
Party	Candidate	Votes	%	±%
Conservative	Kath Perry	4,222	65.4	▲5.4
Conservative	Bernard Williams	3,600	55.7	▲1.7
Labour	John Jones	1,244	19.3	▼2.7
Labour	John Brindle	1,202	18.6	▼2.4
Green	Gary Burnett	429	6.6	▲1.6
UKIP	Steve Hollis	399	6.2	▼5.8
Green	Eunice Lord	310	4.8	▲1.8
UKIP	Glen Keatley	284	4.4	▼8.6
Turnout		6,460	28.8	▲1.4
Conservative hold		Swing		
Conservative hold		Swing		

Division Summary
Party	Votes	% Votes	±%	Seats	Change
Conservative	7,822	66.9	▲6.7	2	
Labour	2,446	20.9	▼1.7	0	
Green	739	6.3	▲2.0	0	
UKIP	683	5.8	▼7.2	0	
Total Votes Cast	11,690				

Codsall
Party	Candidate	Votes	%	±%
Conservative	Bob Spencer	2,227	67.5	▼7.6
Green	Ian Sadler	612	18.6	▲7.9
Labour	Janet Lungley	458	13.9	▼0.3
Majority		1,615	48.9	▼12.0
Turnout		3,326	33.5	▲1.1
Conservative hold		Swing	▼7.8	

Kinver
Party	Candidate	Votes	%	±%
Conservative	Victoria Wilson	2,911	74.5	▲10.1
Green	Bernadette McGourty	546	14.0	▲9.2
Labour	Lorna Jones	453	11.6	▲1.8
Majority		2,365	60.5	▼12.0
Turnout		3,953	37.1	▼4.4
Conservative hold		Swing	▲0.5	

Penkridge
Party	Candidate	Votes	%	±%
Conservative	David Williams	2,188	68.5	▲4.3
Labour	Adam Freeman	599	18.7	▼10.7
Green	Chris Benton	408	12.8	▲6.4
Majority		1,589	49.8	▼12.0
Turnout		3,226	29.1	▲15.0
Conservative hold		Swing	▲7.5	

Perton
Party	Candidate	Votes	%	±%
Conservative	Jak Abrahams	1,912	57.9	▼16.2
Independent	Nigel Caine	785	23.8	N/A
Labour	Nick Hill	437	13.2	▼6.3
Green	Hilde Liesens	169	5.1	▼1.3
Majority		1,127	34.1	▼20.5
Turnout		3,320	33.8	▲4.8
Conservative hold		Swing	▼20.0	

Wombourne
Party	Candidate	Votes	%	±%
Conservative	Mike Davies	2,465	71.0	▼6.6
Labour	Denis Beaumont	575	16.6	▲3.3
Green	Claire McIlvenna	430	12.4	▲3.3
Majority		1,890	54.4	▼9.9
Turnout		3,494	31.4	▲1.9
Conservative hold		Swing	▼5.0	

=== Borough of Stafford ===
(9 seats, 9 electoral divisions)

Stafford Borough summary result
Party	Seats	Gains	Losses	Net gain/loss	Seats %	Votes %	Votes	+/−
Conservative	7	0	0	0	77.8	52.1	18,289	▼4.0
Labour	1	0	0	0	11.1	23.4	8,202	▼1.3
Independent	1	0	0	0	11.1	7.3	2,563	▲0.1
Green	0	0	0	0	0.0	10.8	3,806	▲3.8
Chase Indies	0	0	0	0	0.0	3.4	1,195	N/A
UKIP	0	0	0	0	0.0	1.2	426	▼2.8
Liberal Democrats	0	0	0	0	0.0	1.0	360	▼0.5
Reform	0	0	0	0	0.0	0.3	121	N/A
TUSC	0	0	0	0	0.0	0.3	106	N/A
Heritage	0	0	0	0	0.0	0.2	55	N/A

Eccleshall
Party	Candidate	Votes	%	±%
Conservative	Jeremy Pert	2,663	67.2	▼5.9
Labour Co-op	Ant Reid	886	22.3	▲6.7
Green	Damon Hoppe	295	7.4	▲0.9
UKIP	Edward Whitfield	121	3.1	▼1.7
Majority		1,777	44.9	▼12.6
Turnout		3,996	34.9	▲0.3
Conservative hold		Swing	▼6.3	

Gnosall and Doxey
Party	Candidate	Votes	%	±%
Conservative	Mark Winnington	2,771	53.9	▼16.4
Green	Emma Carter	1,824	35.5	▲25.2
Labour	Colin Ball	545	10.6	▼8.8
Majority		947	18.4	▼32.5
Turnout		5,173	40.3	▲4.4
Conservative hold		Swing	▼20.8	

Stafford Central
Party	Candidate	Votes	%	±%
Labour Co-op	Gillian Pardesi	1,357	43.3	▼2.9
Conservative	Paul Startin	1,259	40.2	▲3.1
Green	Roisin Chambers	377	12.0	▲7.3
UKIP	Paul Williams	94	3.0	▼3.0
TUSC	Craig Bates	48	1.5	N/A
Majority		98	3.1	▼6.0
Turnout		3,157	27.8	▼0.2
Labour Co-op hold		Swing	▼3.0	

Stafford North
Party	Candidate	Votes	%	±%
Conservative	Jonathan Price	1,721	54.9	▲13.8
Labour Co-op	Julian Thorley	1,011	32.3	▲2.6
Green	Daniel Laidler	273	8.7	▼6.5
UKIP	Phillip Smith	70	2.2	▼2.6
TUSC	Josie Shelley	58	1.9	N/A
Majority		710	22.6	▲11.2
Turnout		3,150	30.4	▼3.3
Conservative hold		Swing	▲5.6	

Stafford South East
Party	Candidate	Votes	%	±%
Conservative	Ann Edgeller	2,546	62.2	▲1.4
Labour	Julie Read	1,175	28.7	▲3.7
Green	David Whittaker	313	7.6	▲4.6
UKIP	Harvey Wain-Williams	61	1.5	▼2.4
Majority		1,371	33.5	▲2.3
Turnout		4,120	36.7	▼0.7
Conservative hold		Swing	▲1.2	

Stafford Trent Valley
Party	Candidate	Votes	%	±%
Conservative	John Francis	2,047	48.1	▼18.6
Chase Indies	Brendan McKeown	1,195	28.1	N/A
Labour Co-op	Dee McNaughton	696	16.4	▼1.8
Green	Victoria Door	316	7.4	▼1.4
Majority		852	20.0	▼28.5
Turnout		4,290	37.0	▲0.4
Conservative hold		Swing	▼23.4	

Stafford West
Party	Candidate	Votes	%	±%
Conservative	Carolyn Trowbridge	1,718	49.5	▲2.7
Labour Co-op	Aidan Godfrey	1,327	38.2	▼3.7
Green	Douglas Rouxel	290	8.4	▲3.0
UKIP	John Jeffrey	80	2.3	▼3.6
Heritage	Craig Morton	55	1.6	N/A
Majority		391	11.3	▲6.4
Turnout		3,482	30.0	▼0.2
Conservative hold		Swing	▲3.2	

Stone Rural
Party	Candidate	Votes	%	±%
Conservative	Ian Parry	2,150	56.5	▼11.5
Independent	Jim Davies	589	15.5	N/A
Labour	David Nicoll	585	15.4	▼2.7
Liberal Democrats	Alec Sandiford	360	9.5	N/A
Reform	Daniel Bentley	121	3.2	N/A
Majority		1,561	41.0	▼8.9
Turnout		3,843	33.2	▼0.2
Conservative hold		Swing	▼13.5	

Stone Urban
Party	Candidate	Votes	%	±%
Independent	Jill Hood	1,974	47.8	▲4.4
Conservative	Simon Bell	1,414	34.3	▲0.1
Labour	Tracey Lindop	620	15.0	▲0.9
Green	Rob Norman	118	2.9	▲0.4
Majority		560	13.5	▲4.3
Turnout		4,147	36.7	▲1.4
Independent hold		Swing	▲2.2	

=== District of Staffordshire Moorlands ===
(7 seats, 7 electoral divisions)

Staffordshire Moorlands District summary result
Party	Seats	Gains	Losses	Net gain/loss	Seats %	Votes %	Votes	+/−
Conservative	6	0	0	0	85.7	56.5	13,618	▲4.2
Labour	1	0	0	0	14.3	30.0	7,227	▲0.5
Green	0	0	0	0	0.0	5.8	1,387	▲3.7
Independent	0	0	0	0	11.1	5.4	1,291	▲0.1
Liberal Democrats	0	0	0	0	0.0	2.4	578	▼6.2

Biddulph North
Party	Candidate	Votes	%	±%
Conservative	Ian Lawson	1,819	57.6	▼1.0
Labour Co-op	Nigel Yates	1,127	35.7	▼0.3
Green	Ian Waite	213	6.7	N/A
Majority		692	21.9	▼0.7
Turnout		3,177	31.9	▲1.2
Conservative hold		Swing	▲0.4	

Biddulph South and Endon
Party	Candidate	Votes	%	±%
Conservative	Keith Flunder	1,803	57.9	▲21.5
Labour	Jill Salt	876	28.1	▼2.2
Liberal Democrats	John Redfern	406	13.0	▼20.3
Majority		927	29.8	▲26.7
Turnout		3,116	27.8	▼2.4
Conservative hold		Swing	▲11.9	

Caverswall
Party	Candidate	Votes	%	±%
Conservative	Ross Ward	2,202	71.4	▲3.1
Labour	Andrew Church	621	20.1	▲2.8
Green	Andrew Sharrock	261	8.5	N/A
Majority		1,581	51.3	▲0.3
Turnout		3,110	28.8	▼1.8
Conservative hold		Swing	▲0.2	

Cheadle and Checkley
Party	Candidate	Votes	%	±%
Conservative	Mark Deaville	1,774	52.9	▼3.5
Independent	Peter Wilkinson	758	22.6	N/A
Labour	Debra Gratton	637	19.0	▼2.5
Green	Andrew Sharrock	187	5.6	▲3.4
Majority		1,016	30.3	▼4.6
Turnout		3,377	29.6	▼1.7
Conservative hold		Swing	▲13.1	

Churnet Valley
Party	Candidate	Votes	%	±%
Conservative	Mike Worthington	2,316	63.1	▲7.8
Labour	Bill Cawley	959	26.1	▲6.5
Green	Helen Stead	396	10.8	▲6.8
Majority		1,357	37.0	▲1.3
Turnout		3,698	31.4	▲1.2
Conservative hold		Swing	▲0.7	

Leek Rural
Party	Candidate	Votes	%	±%
Conservative	Gill Heath	2,291	56.9	▼0.6
Labour	Matt Swindlehurst	875	21.7	▼2.3
Independent	Linda Malyon	533	13.2	▲2.8
Green	Jonathan Kempster	330	8.2	▲4.3
Majority		1,416	35.2	▲1.7
Turnout		4,044	35.2	▼2.2
Conservative hold		Swing	▲0.9	

Leek South
Party	Candidate	Votes	%	±%
Labour Co-op	Charlotte Atkins	2,132	57.4	▲2.4
Conservative	Jo Cox	1,413	38.0	▲1.4
Liberal Democrats	Roy Gregg	172	4.6	▲0.1
Majority		719	19.4	▲1.0
Turnout		3,739	33.4	▼2.3
Labour Co-op hold		Swing	▲0.5	

=== Borough of Tamworth ===
(6 seats, 6 electoral divisions)

Tamworth Borough summary result
Party	Seats	Gains	Losses	Net gain/loss	Seats %	Votes %	Votes	+/−
Conservative	6	0	0	0	100.0	57.2	10,469	▲9.3
Labour	0	0	0	0	0.0	30.0	5,487	▼5.1
Independent	0	0	0	0	0.0	5.6	1,015	N/A
UKIP	0	0	0	0	0.0	5.3	975	▼5.7
Green	0	0	0	0	0.0	1.9	345	▼1.6

Amington
Party	Candidate	Votes	%	±%
Conservative	Thomas Jay	1,751	58.0	▲16.3
Labour Co-op	Sheree Peaple	967	32.0	▼8.8
Green	Andy Tilley	160	5.3	▲1.5
UKIP	Wayne Hughes	141	4.7	▼9.4
Majority		784	26.0	▲25.5
Turnout		3,041	30.6	▼0.3
Conservative hold		Swing	▲12.8	

Bolebridge
Party	Candidate	Votes	%	±%
Conservative	Jeremy Oates	1,811	59.1	▲15.2
Labour Co-op	Simon Peaple	1,063	34.7	▼5.3
UKIP	Gary Martin	189	6.2	▼2.7
Majority		748	24.4	▲20.5
Turnout		3,096	31.8	▲0.7
Conservative hold		Swing	▲10.3	

Perrycrofts
Party	Candidate	Votes	%	±%
Conservative	Robert Pritchard	1,647	45.3	▼3.7
Independent	Richard Kingstone	1,015	27.9	N/A
Labour Co-op	Gordon Moore	874	24.0	▼10.3
UKIP	Lisa Morris	101	2.8	▼4.9
Majority		632	17.4	▲2.7
Turnout		3,662	35.6	▲0.3
Conservative hold		Swing	▲15.8	

Stonydelph
Party	Candidate	Votes	%	±%
Conservative	Jason Jones	1,357	56.1	▲14.3
Labour Co-op	Chris Bain	651	26.9	▼8.8
UKIP	Robert Bilcliff	226	9.3	▼8.3
Green	Eddie Jones	185	7.6	▲2.7
Majority		706	29.2	▲23.1
Turnout		2,437	25.4	▲0.9
Conservative hold		Swing	▲11.6	

Watling North
Party	Candidate	Votes	%	±%
Conservative	Tina Clements	1,721	59.9	▲9.5
Labour	Bob Bayley	990	34.4	▼1.6
UKIP	Mark Hopkins	164	5.7	▼3.4
Majority		731	25.5	▲11.1
Turnout		2,894	29.3	▼0.6
Conservative hold		Swing	▲5.6	

Watling South
Party	Candidate	Votes	%	±%
Conservative	Richard Ford	2,182	66.6	▲7.5
Labour Co-op	Stephen Andrews	942	28.7	▲4.7
UKIP	Gail Bilcliff	154	4.7	▼5.5
Majority		1,240	37.9	▲2.8
Turnout		3,301	33.8	▲2.5
Conservative hold		Swing	▲1.4	

== By-elections ==
=== Biddulph North ===
Biddulph North: 19 January 2023
Party	Candidate	Votes	%	±%
Labour Co-op	Nigel Yates	931	49.5	+13.8
Independent	Andrew Hart	493	26.2	N/A
Conservative	Rathi Pragasam	458	24.3	–33.3
Majority		438	23.3	
Turnout		1,888	19.2	
Registered electors		9,855		
Labour Co-op gain from Conservative		Swing	N/A	
