= 2009 Staffordshire County Council election =

2009 UK local government election

← 2005	4 June 2009	2013 →

All 62 seats to Staffordshire County Council 32 seats needed for a majority
	First party	Second party
Party	Conservative	Liberal Democrats
Seats won	49	4
Seat change	▲22	▲2
	Third party	Fourth party
Party	UKIP	Labour
Seats won	4	3
Seat change	▲4	▼29
- 2009 local election results in Staffordshire
Council control before election
Labour
Council control after election
Conservative

Elections to Staffordshire County Council took place on 4 June 2009 as part of the 2009 United Kingdom local elections, having been delayed from 7 May, in order to coincide with elections to the European Parliament. 62 councillors were elected from the various electoral divisions, which returned either one or two county councillors each by first-past-the-post voting for a four-year term of office. The electoral divisions were the same as those used at the previous election in 2005. The council continues to be administered on the Leader and Cabinet model.

All locally registered electors (British, Irish, Commonwealth and European Union citizens) who were aged 18 or over on Thursday 2 May 2013 were entitled to vote in the local elections. Those who were temporarily away from their ordinary address (for example, away working, on holiday, in student accommodation or in hospital) were also entitled to vote in the local elections, although those who had moved abroad and registered as overseas electors cannot vote in the local elections. It is possible to register to vote at more than one address (such as a university student who had a term-time address and lives at home during holidays) at the discretion of the local Electoral Register Office, but it remains an offence to vote more than once in the same local government election.

== Summary ==
The election was won by the Conservatives with 49 seats (a net gain of 22 seats), defeating Labour who were reduced to just 3 seats (a net loss of 29 seats) who were the ruling party for 28 years running. The Liberal Democrats came joint second with UKIP with 4 seats each, and there were 2 independent candidates elected.

== Overall results ==
Staffordshire County Council election, 2009
Party	Seats	Gains	Losses	Net gain/loss	Seats %	Votes %	Votes	+/−
Conservative	49			+22	79%	43%	109,699	
Liberal Democrats	4			+2	6.45%	17%		
UKIP	4			+4	6.45%	10%		
Labour	3			-29	4.84%	18%	46,315	
Independent	1	0	0	0	1.61%	4%		
Staffordshire Independent Group	1	1	0	+1	1.61%	<1%		
Green	0	0	0	0	0	4%		
BNP	0	0	0	0	0	2%		
Hands Off Tamworth Schools	0	0	0	0	0	<1%		
Popular Alliance	0	0	0	0	0	<1%		
Mercian Party	0	0	0	0	0	<1%		
