= 2001 Staffordshire County Council election =

2001 UK local government election

- 7 June 2001

All 62 seats to Staffordshire County Council 32 seats needed for a majority
	First party	Second party
Party	Labour	Conservative
Seats won	36	24
Seat change	▼4	▲4
	Third party
Party	Liberal Democrats
Seats won	2
Seat change	0
Council control before election
Labour
Council control after election
Labour

Elections to Staffordshire County Council took place on 7 June 2001, as part of the 2001 United Kingdom local elections, and on the same day as the general election. The elections had been delayed from May 2001 due to the outbreak of foot-and-mouth disease. All 62 seats were up for election.

== Summary ==
The election was won by the Labour Party, with 36 seats.

== Overall results ==
Staffordshire County Council election, 2001
Party	Seats	Gains	Losses	Net gain/loss	Seats %	Votes %	Votes	+/−
Labour	36			-4	58.0	41%		
Conservative	24			+4	39.0	38%		
Liberal Democrats	2			0	3.0	17%		
Independent	0			0	0.0	2%		
Other	0			0	0.0	1%		
