= 2017 Staffordshire County Council election =

2017 UK local government election

- 4 May 2017

All 62 seats to Staffordshire County Council 32 seats needed for a majority
| | First party | Second party | Third party |
|---|---|---|---|
| Party | Conservative | Labour | UKIP |
| Last election | 34 seats, 36% | 24 seats, 30% | 2 seats, 24% |
| Seats won | 51 | 10 | 0 |
| Seat change | ▲21 | ▼14 | ▼2 |
| Popular vote | 116,644 | 60,697 | 12,947 |
| Percentage | 53.8% | 28.0% | 6.0% |
| Swing | ▲17.8% | ▼2.0% | ▼18.0% |
- Map showing the results of the 2017 Staffordshire County Council elections.
Council control before election
Conservative
Council control after election
Conservative

The 2017 Staffordshire County Council election took place on 4 May 2017 as part of 2017 local elections in the UK. All 62 councillors were elected from electoral divisions (two of which serve dual-councillor electoral divisions) for a four-year term of office. The system used is first-past-the-post voting.

The result was Conservative councillors formed an increased majority on the council.

== Results summary ==
Staffordshire County Council election, 2017
| Party | Seats | Gains | Losses | Net gain/loss | Seats % | Votes % | Votes | +/− |
|---|---|---|---|---|---|---|---|---|
| Conservative | 51 | | | +17 | | 53.8 | 116,644 | |
| Labour | 10 | | | -14 | | 28.0 | 60,697 | |
| Other parties | 1 | | | -1 | | 2.7 | 5,789 | |
| UKIP | 0 | | | -2 | | 6.0 | 12,947 | |
| Green | 0 | | | 0 | | 5.0 | 10,897 | |
| Liberal Democrats | 0 | | | 0 | | 4.6 | 10,017 | |

== Division results for Cannock Chase District ==
Spoilt votes not included below.

=== Brereton & Ravenhill Division ===
Brereton & Ravenhill
| Party | Candidate | Votes | % | ±% |
|---|---|---|---|---|
| Labour | Alan Dudson | 941 | 36 | −2 |
| Conservative | Olivia Lyons | 838 | 32 | +19 |
| Liberal Democrats | Paul Fisher | 618 | 24 | +5 |
| UKIP | Ann Bernard | 207 | 8 | −20 |
| Majority | | | | |
| Turnout | | | | |
| Labour hold | | Swing | | |

=== Cannock Town Centre Division ===
Cannock Town Centre
| Party | Candidate | Votes | % | ±% |
|---|---|---|---|---|
| Conservative | Paul Snape | 1,989 | 55 | +20 |
| Labour | Trudie McGuinness | 1,154 | 32 | −9 |
| UKIP | Kevin Whittaker | 305 | 8 | −13 |
| Green | Marie Smith | 168 | 5 | N/A |
| Majority | | | | |
| Turnout | | | | |
| Conservative gain from Labour | | Swing | | |

=== Cannock Villages Division ===
Cannock Villages
| Party | Candidate | Votes | % | ±% |
|---|---|---|---|---|
| Conservative | Johnny McMahon | 1,420 | 49 | +22 |
| Labour | Diane Todd | 1,023 | 35 | −9 |
| UKIP | John Bernard | 333 | 12 | −11 |
| Green | 110 | 4 | N/A | |
| Majority | | | | |
| Turnout | | | | |
| Conservative gain from Labour | | Swing | | |

=== Chadsmoor Division ===
Chadsmoor
| Party | Candidate | Votes | % | ±% |
|---|---|---|---|---|
| Labour | Derek Davis, OBE | 1,449 | 51 | −7 |
| Conservative | Jim Bowater | 870 | 30 | +15 |
| UKIP | Dave Morris | 408 | 14 | −7 |
| Green | Jo Elson | 132 | 5 | N/A |
| Majority | | | | |
| Turnout | | | | |
| Labour hold | | Swing | | |

=== Etchinghill & Heath Division ===
Etchinghill & Heath
| Party | Candidate | Votes | % | ±% |
|---|---|---|---|---|
| Conservative | Mike Sutherland | 1,590 | 57 | +25 |
| Labour | Carl Bennett | 674 | 24 | +1 |
| Liberal Democrats | Ray Jones | 249 | 9 | −9 |
| UKIP | Robert Branson | 202 | 7 | −20 |
| Green | Michael Lees | 70 | 3 | N/A |
| Majority | | | | |
| Turnout | | | | |
| Conservative hold | | Swing | | |

=== Hednesford & Rawnsley Division ===
Hednesford & Rawnsley
| Party | Candidate | Votes | % | ±% |
|---|---|---|---|---|
| Conservative | Graham Burnett | 2,597 | 38 | +12 |
| Conservative | Phil Hewitt | 2,305 | 34 | +13 |
| Labour | George Adamson | 1,998 | 29 | −11 |
| Green | Paul Woodhead | 1,807 | 26 | N/A |
| Labour | Christine Mitchell | 1,683 | 25 | −10 |
| Green | Stuart Crabtree | 1,482 | 22 | N/A |
| UKIP | Dave Percox | 555 | 8 | −21 |
| UKIP | Paul Allen | 530 | 8 | −18 |
| Local Residents Putting The People First | Ann Turville | 251 | 4 | N/A |
| Local Residents Putting The People First | Ron Turville | 168 | 2 | N/A |
| Majority | | | | |
| Turnout | | | | |
| Conservative gain from Labour | | Swing | | |
| Conservative gain from Labour | | Swing | | |

== Division results for East Staffordshire ==
Spoilt votes not included below.

=== Burton Tower Division ===
Burton Tower
| Party | Candidate | Votes | % | ±% |
|---|---|---|---|---|
| Conservative | Conor Wileman | 2,261 | 62 | +18 |
| Labour | Philippa Saddington | 1,010 | 28 | −11 |
| Liberal Democrats | Robert Coates | 213 | 6 | N/A |
| Green | Carol Sharratt | 162 | 4 | N/A |
| Majority | | | | |
| Turnout | | | | |
| Conservative hold | | Swing | | |

=== Burton Town Division ===
Burton Town
| Party | Candidate | Votes | % | ±% |
|---|---|---|---|---|
| Labour | Ron Clarke | 1,351 | 43 | −10 |
| Conservative | Hamid Asghar | 1,106 | 35 | +18 |
| Liberal Democrats | Helen Hall | 372 | 12 | +3 |
| UKIP | Dene Whyman | 258 | 8 | −11 |
| Green | Simon Hales | 82 | 3 | N/A |
| Majority | | | | |
| Turnout | | | | |
| Labour hold | | Swing | | |

=== Burton Trent Division ===
Burton Trent
| Party | Candidate | Votes | % | ±% |
|---|---|---|---|---|
| Labour | Syed Hussain | 1,488 | 56 | +9 |
| Conservative | Maqsood Hussain | 658 | 25 | +6 |
| UKIP | Sally Green | 490 | 19 | −10 |
| Majority | | | | |
| Turnout | | | | |
| Labour hold | | Swing | | |

=== Dove Division ===
Dove
| Party | Candidate | Votes | % | ±% |
|---|---|---|---|---|
| Conservative | Philip White | 2,549 | 63 | +23 |
| Labour | John Anderson | 1,114 | 28 | +5 |
| UKIP | Mike Green | 375 | 9 | −27 |
| Majority | | | | |
| Turnout | | | | |
| Conservative hold | | Swing | | |

=== Horninglow & Stretton Division ===
Horninglow & Stretton
| Party | Candidate | Votes | % | ±% |
|---|---|---|---|---|
| Conservative | Bernard Peters | 1,911 | 53 | +19 |
| Labour | Shelagh McKiernan | 1,104 | 31 | −5 |
| UKIP | Peter Levis | 416 | 12 | −18 |
| Liberal Democrats | Hugh Warner | 103 | 3 | N/A |
| Green | Robert Sharratt | 73 | 2 | N/A |
| Majority | | | | |
| Turnout | | | | |
| Conservative gain from Labour | | Swing | | |

=== Needwood Forest Division ===
Needwood Forest
| Party | Candidate | Votes | % | ±% |
|---|---|---|---|---|
| Conservative | Julia Jessel | 2,719 | 72 | +25 |
| Labour | Robert Saddington | 792 | 21 | − |
| Green | Kelly Rickard | 242 | 6 | N/A |
| Majority | | | | |
| Turnout | | | | |
| Conservative hold | | Swing | | |

=== Uttoxeter Rural Division ===
Uttoxeter Rural
| Party | Candidate | Votes | % | ±% |
|---|---|---|---|---|
| Conservative | Philip Atkins | 3,169 | 79 | +4 |
| Labour | Chloe Kelly | 553 | 14 | −4 |
| UKIP | George Langley-Poole | 285 | 7 | N/A |
| Majority | | | | |
| Turnout | | | | |
| Conservative hold | | Swing | | |

=== Uttoxeter Town Division ===
Uttoxeter Town
| Party | Candidate | Votes | % | ±% |
|---|---|---|---|---|
| Conservative | David Brookes | 1,763 | 60 | +20 |
| Labour | John McKiernan | 857 | 29 | −7 |
| UKIP | Norman Moir | 313 | 11 | −9 |
| Majority | | | | |
| Turnout | | | | |
| Conservative hold | | Swing | | |

== Division results for Lichfield District ==
Spoilt votes not included below.

=== Burntwood North Division ===
Burntwood North
| Party | Candidate | Votes | % | ±% |
|---|---|---|---|---|
| Labour | Susan Woodward | 1,371 | 47 | +6 |
| Conservative | Eileen Tranter | 1,321 | 45 | +15 |
| UKIP | Martin Dewes | 175 | 6 | −20 |
| Green | Carol Ivett | 76 | 3 | N/A |
| Majority | | | | |
| Turnout | | | | |
| Labour hold | | Swing | | |

=== Burntwood South Division ===
Burntwood South
| Party | Candidate | Votes | % | ±% |
|---|---|---|---|---|
| Conservative | Helen Fisher | 1,506 | 53 | +31 |
| Labour | Steven Norman | 848 | 30 | +2 |
| UKIP | John Hitchin | 280 | 10 | −23 |
| Liberal Democrats | John Smith | 114 | 4 | N/A |
| Green | Adam Elsdon | 72 | 3 | N/A |
| Majority | | | | |
| Turnout | | | | |
| Conservative gain from UKIP | | Swing | | |

=== Lichfield City North Division ===
Lichfield City North
| Party | Candidate | Votes | % | ±% |
|---|---|---|---|---|
| Conservative | Natasha Pullen | 1,571 | 46 | +12 |
| Labour | Caroline Wood | 1,076 | 32 | −4 |
| Liberal Democrats | Miles Trent | 420 | 12 | +4 |
| Something New | Philip Peter | 175 | 5 | N/A |
| Green | Hilary Wolfenden | 163 | 5 | N/A |
| Majority | | | | |
| Turnout | | | | |
| Conservative gain from Labour | | Swing | | |

=== Lichfield City South Division ===
Lichfield City South
| Party | Candidate | Votes | % | ±% |
|---|---|---|---|---|
| Conservative | Colin Greatorex | 1,982 | 56 | +11 |
| Liberal Democrats | Jamie Christie | 645 | 18 | +3 |
| Labour | Colin Ball | 623 | 18 | −1 |
| Green | Simon Partridge | 269 | 8 | N/A |
| Majority | | | | |
| Turnout | | | | |
| Conservative hold | | Swing | | |

=== Lichfield Rural East Division ===
Lichfield Rural East
| Party | Candidate | Votes | % | ±% |
|---|---|---|---|---|
| Conservative | Alan White | 2,077 | 63 | +19 |
| Labour | Glen Mynott | 562 | 17 | −5 |
| Liberal Democrats | Roger Bennion | 365 | 11 | +6 |
| Green | Robert Pass | 270 | 8 | N/A |
| Majority | | | | |
| Turnout | | | | |
| Conservative hold | | Swing | | |

=== Lichfield Rural North Division ===
Lichfield Rural North
| Party | Candidate | Votes | % | ±% |
|---|---|---|---|---|
| Conservative | Janet Eagland | 2,145 | 68 | +19 |
| Labour | David Harvey | 478 | 15 | −2 |
| Liberal Democrats | Jeyan Anketell | 378 | 12 | +6 |
| Green | Michael Broughton | 164 | 5 | N/A |
| Majority | | | | |
| Turnout | | | | |
| Conservative hold | | Swing | | |

=== Lichfield Rural South Division ===
Lichfield Rural South
| Party | Candidate | Votes | % | ±% |
|---|---|---|---|---|
| Conservative | David Smith | 2,497 | 74 | +22 |
| Labour | David Thompson | 496 | 15 | +2 |
| Liberal Democrats | Alasdair Brooks | 225 | 7 | +3 |
| Green | Mathew Hayward | 159 | 5 | N/A |
| Majority | | | | |
| Turnout | | | | |
| Conservative hold | | Swing | | |

=== Lichfield Rural West Division ===
Lichfield Rural West
| Party | Candidate | Votes | % | ±% |
|---|---|---|---|---|
| Conservative | Martyn Tittley | 2,279 | 70 | +26 |
| Labour | Ben Watkins | 555 | 17 | −2 |
| Liberal Democrats | Richard Rathbone | 200 | 6 | +2 |
| Green | Kate Tilley | 199 | 6 | N/A |
| Majority | | | | |
| Turnout | | | | |
| Conservative hold | | Swing | | |

== Division results for Borough of Newcastle-under-Lyme ==
Spoilt votes not included below.

=== Audley & Chesterton Division ===
Audley & Chesterton
| Party | Candidate | Votes | % | ±% |
|---|---|---|---|---|
| Labour | Ann Beech | 1,245 | 39 | − |
| Conservative | David Cooper | 873 | 27 | +21 |
| Liberal Democrats | Ian Wilkes | 748 | 23 | −2 |
| UKIP | Mark Barlow | 365 | 11 | −15 |
| Majority | | | | |
| Turnout | | | | |
| Labour hold | | Swing | | |

=== Bradwell, Porthill & Wolstanton Division ===
Bradwell, Porthill & Wolstanton
| Party | Candidate | Votes | % | ±% |
|---|---|---|---|---|
| Conservative | John Cooper | 1,552 | 49 | +27 |
| Labour | Sandra Hambleton | 1,506 | 47 | +2 |
| Liberal Democrats | Richard Virr | 136 | 4 | +1 |
| Majority | | | | |
| Turnout | | | | |
| Conservative gain from Labour | | Swing | | |

=== Keele, Knutton & Silverdale Division ===
Keele, Knutton & Silverdale
| Party | Candidate | Votes | % | ±% |
|---|---|---|---|---|
| Labour | Dave Jones | 965 | 52 | +14 |
| Conservative | Mark Holland | 505 | 27 | +19 |
| UKIP | Neil Farrow | 222 | 12 | −26 |
| Liberal Democrats | James Borg | 112 | 6 | N/A |
| Green | Gordon Pearson | 53 | 3 | −4 |
| Majority | | | | |
| Turnout | | | | |
| Labour gain from UKIP | | Swing | | |

=== Kidsgrove Division ===
Kidsgrove
| Party | Candidate | Votes | % | ±% |
|---|---|---|---|---|
| Conservative | Gill Burnett | 1,057 | 35 | +24 |
| Labour | Laura Dillon | 967 | 32 | −12 |
| Independent | Margaret Astle | 570 | 19 | −25 |
| UKIP | Geoffrey Locke | 447 | 15 | −26 |
| Majority | | | | |
| Turnout | | | | |
| Conservative gain from Labour | | Swing | | |

=== May Bank & Cross Heath Division ===
May Bank & Cross Heath
| Party | Candidate | Votes | % | ±% |
|---|---|---|---|---|
| Conservative | Trevor Johnson | 1,608 | 46 | +21 |
| Labour | Mark Olszewski | 1,475 | 42 | +1 |
| UKIP | Lynn Dean | 297 | 8 | −16 |
| Liberal Democrats | Andrew Wemyss | 149 | 4 | − |
| Majority | | | | |
| Turnout | | | | |
| Conservative gain from Labour | | Swing | | |

=== Newcastle Rural Division ===
Newcastle Rural
| Party | Candidate | Votes | % | ±% |
|---|---|---|---|---|
| Conservative | Paul Northcott | 2,359 | 73 | +27 |
| Liberal Democrats | Matthew Elphinstone-Walker | 649 | 20 | +9 |
| UKIP | Gordon Davies | 210 | 7 | −21 |
| Majority | | | | |
| Turnout | | | | |
| Conservative hold | | Swing | | |

=== Newcastle South Division ===
Newcastle South
| Party | Candidate | Votes | % | ±% |
|---|---|---|---|---|
| Conservative | Stephen Sweeney | 1,859 | 51 | +12 |
| Labour | Ruth Wright | 1,306 | 36 | − |
| UKIP | Gary Fedtschyschak | 255 | 7 | −18 |
| Liberal Democrats | Richard Whelan | 143 | 4 | N/A |
| Green | Joseph Talbot | 90 | 2 | N/A |
| Majority | | | | |
| Turnout | | | | |
| Conservative hold | | Swing | | |

=== Talke & Red Street Division ===
Talke & Red Street
| Party | Candidate | Votes | % | ±% |
|---|---|---|---|---|
| Labour | Kyle Robinson | 1,793 | 55 | +7 |
| Conservative | Jill Waring | 1,042 | 32 | +20 |
| UKIP | Raymond Williams | 274 | 8 | −25 |
| Liberal Democrats | Ben Ireland | 137 | 4 | −2 |
| Majority | | | | |
| Turnout | | | | |
| Labour hold | | Swing | | |

=== Westlands & Thistleberry Division ===
Westlands & Thistleberry
| Party | Candidate | Votes | % | ±% |
|---|---|---|---|---|
| Conservative | Simon Tagg | 1,998 | 52 | +6 |
| Liberal Democrats | Marion Reddish | 963 | 25 | +9 |
| Labour | Imogen Wilkes | 653 | 17 | −2 |
| UKIP | Maria Foy | 158 | 4 | −14 |
| Green | Jade Taylor-Cashmore | 84 | 2 | N/A |
| Majority | | | | |
| Turnout | | | | |
| Conservative hold | | Swing | | |

== Division results for South Staffordshire ==
Spoilt votes not included below.

=== Brewood Division ===
Brewood
| Party | Candidate | Votes | % | ±% |
|---|---|---|---|---|
| Conservative | Mark Sutton | 2,329 | 71 | +17 |
| Labour | Lorna Jones | 559 | 17 | −3 |
| Independent | Victor Kelly | 242 | 7 | N/A |
| Green | Kerst Ward | 135 | 4 | N/A |
| Majority | | | | |
| Turnout | | | | |
| Conservative hold | | Swing | | |

=== Cheslyn Hay, Essington & Great Wyrley Division ===
Cheslyn Hay, Essington & Great Wyrley
| Party | Candidate | Votes | % | ±% |
|---|---|---|---|---|
| Conservative | Kath Perry | 3,720 | 60 | +25 |
| Conservative | Bernard Williams | 3,345 | 54 | +23 |
| Labour | Colin Davison | 1,364 | 22 | −1 |
| Labour | John Brindle | 1,285 | 21 | +2 |
| UKIP | Alan Emery | 781 | 13 | −12 |
| UKIP | Steve Hollis | 745 | 12 | −16 |
| Green | David Mermod | 310 | 5 | N/A |
| Green | Richard Jenking | 191 | 3 | N/A |
| Majority | | | | |
| Turnout | | | | |
| Conservative hold | | Swing | | |
| Conservative hold | | Swing | | |

=== Codsall Division ===
Codsall
| Party | Candidate | Votes | % | ±% |
|---|---|---|---|---|
| Conservative | Robert Marshall | 2,327 | 75 | +20 |
| Labour | Nick Hill | 439 | 14 | −2 |
| Green | Gary Burnett | 332 | 11 | N/A |
| Majority | | | | |
| Turnout | | | | |
| Conservative hold | | Swing | | |

=== Kinver Division ===
Kinver
| Party | Candidate | Votes | % | ±% |
|---|---|---|---|---|
| Conservative | Victoria Wilson | 2,217 | 64 | +12 |
| No Description | Seb Hargreaves | 457 | 13 | N/A |
| Labour | Christine Ridgeway | 337 | 10 | −2 |
| UKIP | Gordon Fanthom | 266 | 8 | −28 |
| Green | Ian Sadler | 166 | 5 | N/A |
| Majority | | | | |
| Turnout | | | | |
| Conservative hold | | Swing | | |

=== Penkridge Division ===
Penkridge
| Party | Candidate | Votes | % | ±% |
|---|---|---|---|---|
| Conservative | David Williams | 1,913 | 64 | +8 |
| Labour | Andrew Lenz | 877 | 29 | −15 |
| Green | Scarlett Ward | 191 | 6 | N/A |
| Majority | | | | |
| Turnout | | | | |
| Conservative hold | | Swing | | |

=== Perton Division ===
Perton
| Party | Candidate | Votes | % | ±% |
|---|---|---|---|---|
| Conservative | Keith James | 2,078 | 74 | +35 |
| Labour | Adam Freeman | 546 | 19 | +8 |
| Green | Hilde Liesens | 180 | 6 | N/A |
| Majority | | | | |
| Turnout | | | | |
| Conservative hold | | Swing | | |

=== Wombourne Division ===
Wombourne
| Party | Candidate | Votes | % | ±% |
|---|---|---|---|---|
| Conservative | Mike Davies | 2,517 | 78 | +23 |
| Labour | Daniel Sherriff | 432 | 13 | +1 |
| Green | Claire Mcilvenna | 295 | 9 | N/A |
| Majority | | | | |
| Turnout | | | | |
| Conservative hold | | Swing | | |

== Division results for Borough of Stafford ==
Spoilt votes not included below.

=== Eccleshall Division ===
Eccleshall
| Party | Candidate | Votes | % | ±% |
|---|---|---|---|---|
| Conservative | Jeremy Pert | 2,642 | 73 | +26 |
| Labour | Catherine Gregory | 562 | 16 | +2 |
| Green | Kathryn Elphick | 235 | 7 | N/A |
| UKIP | Edward Whitfield | 175 | 5 | −24 |
| Majority | | | | |
| Turnout | | | | |
| Conservative hold | | Swing | | |

=== Gnosall & Doxey Division ===
Gnosall & Doxey
| Party | Candidate | Votes | % | ±% |
|---|---|---|---|---|
| Conservative | Mark Winnington | 3,065 | 70 | +29 |
| Labour | Rowan Draper | 845 | 19 | +7 |
| Green | Tony Pearce | 451 | 10 | N/A |
| Majority | | | | |
| Turnout | | | | |
| Conservative hold | | Swing | | |

=== Stafford Central Division ===
Stafford Central
| Party | Candidate | Votes | % | ±% |
|---|---|---|---|---|
| Labour | Maureen Compton | 1,451 | 46 | +2 |
| Conservative | Mary Jennings | 1,165 | 37 | +8 |
| Liberal Democrats | Richard Kemp | 187 | 6 | N/A |
| UKIP | Paul Williams | 187 | 6 | −14 |
| Green | Sharon Hollinshead | 149 | 5 | −1 |
| Majority | | | | |
| Turnout | | | | |
| Labour hold | | Swing | | |

=== Stafford North Division ===
Stafford North
| Party | Candidate | Votes | % | ±% |
|---|---|---|---|---|
| Conservative | Jonathan Price | 1,417 | 41 | +5 |
| Labour | Julian Thorley | 1,023 | 30 | −10 |
| Green | Ian Hollinshead | 524 | 15 | +11 |
| Independent | Geoff Small | 322 | 9 | N/A |
| UKIP | Raymond Smith | 164 | 5 | −14 |
| Majority | | | | |
| Turnout | | | | |
| Conservative gain from Labour | | Swing | | |

=== Stafford South East Division ===
Stafford South East
| Party | Candidate | Votes | % | ±% |
|---|---|---|---|---|
| Conservative | Ann Edgeller | 2,537 | 61 | +18 |
| Labour | Louise Nixon | 1,045 | 25 | −7 |
| Liberal Democrats | Andrew Cliff | 304 | 7 | N/A |
| UKIP | William Stanfield | 163 | 4 | −17 |
| Green | Mike Shone | 125 | 3 | −1 |
| Majority | | | | |
| Turnout | | | | |
| Conservative hold | | Swing | | |

=== Stafford Trent Valley Division ===
Stafford Trent Valley
| Party | Candidate | Votes | % | ±% |
|---|---|---|---|---|
| Conservative | John Francis | 2,573 | 67 | +20 |
| Labour | Trevor Fisher | 702 | 18 | −4 |
| Green | Mark Oliver | 340 | 9 | N/A |
| UKIP | John Mosley | 241 | 6 | −25 |
| Majority | | | | |
| Turnout | | | | |
| Conservative hold | | Swing | | |

=== Stafford West Division ===
Stafford West
| Party | Candidate | Votes | % | ±% |
|---|---|---|---|---|
| Conservative | Carolyn Trowbridge | 1,635 | 47 | +15 |
| Labour | Trish Rowlands | 1,463 | 42 | −3 |
| UKIP | Ellis Stones | 206 | 6 | −12 |
| Green | Toby Hollinshead | 189 | 5 | +1 |
| Majority | | | | |
| Turnout | | | | |
| Conservative gain from Labour | | Swing | | |

=== Stone Rural Division ===
Stone Rural
| Party | Candidate | Votes | % | ±% |
|---|---|---|---|---|
| Conservative | Ian Parry | 2,546 | 68 | +31 |
| Labour | Richard Sidley | 679 | 18 | +5 |
| No Description | Mark Green | 273 | 7 | N/A |
| Green | Pete Latham | 248 | 7 | N/A |
| Majority | | | | |
| Turnout | | | | |
| Conservative hold | | Swing | | |

=== Stone Urban Division ===
Stone Urban
| Party | Candidate | Votes | % | ±% |
|---|---|---|---|---|
| Independent | Jill Hood | 1,694 | 43 | N/A |
| Conservative | Philip Jones | 1,333 | 34 | +6 |
| Labour | Andrew Church | 550 | 14 | −3 |
| UKIP | Andrew Illsley | 227 | 6 | −19 |
| Green | Thomas Harris | 98 | 3 | N/A |
| Majority | | | | |
| Turnout | | | | |
| Independent gain from Conservative | | Swing | | |

== Division results for Staffordshire Moorlands ==
Spoilt votes not included below.

=== Biddulph North Division ===
Biddulph North
| Party | Candidate | Votes | % | ±% |
|---|---|---|---|---|
| Conservative | Ian Lawson | 1,808 | 59 | +23 |
| Labour | Christopher Wood | 1,111 | 36 | +6 |
| Liberal Democrats | Danielle Spooner | 168 | 5 | − |
| Majority | | | | |
| Turnout | | | | |
| Conservative hold | | Swing | | |

=== Biddulph South & Endon Division ===
Biddulph South & Endon
| Party | Candidate | Votes | % | ±% |
|---|---|---|---|---|
| Conservative | Keith Flunder | 1,247 | 36 | +11 |
| Liberal Democrats | Henry Jebb | 1,139 | 33 | +8 |
| Labour | Kevin Jackson | 1,037 | 30 | +1 |
| Majority | | | | |
| Turnout | | | | |
| Conservative gain from Labour | | Swing | | |

=== Caverswall Division ===
Caverswall
| Party | Candidate | Votes | % | ±% |
|---|---|---|---|---|
| Conservative | Ross Ward | 2,252 | 68 | +37 |
| Labour | Jocelyn Morrison | 570 | 17 | +2 |
| Independent | Julie Bull | 356 | 11 | N/A |
| Liberal Democrats | Christoper Simpkins | 119 | 4 | N/A |
| Majority | | 1,682 | 51.0 | |
| Turnout | | 3,297 | 30.0 | |
| Conservative gain from Independent | | Swing | | |

=== Cheadle & Checkley Division ===
Cheadle & Checkley
| Party | Candidate | Votes | % | ±% |
|---|---|---|---|---|
| Conservative | Mark Deaville | 1,815 | 56 | +11 |
| Labour | John Palfreyman | 691 | 21 | −5 |
| UKIP | Peter Wilkinson | 518 | 16 | −9 |
| Liberal Democrats | Judy Gregg | 121 | 4 | − |
| Green | James Firkins | 71 | 2 | N/A |
| Majority | | | | |
| Turnout | | | | |
| Conservative hold | | Swing | | |

=== Churnet Valley ===
Churnet Valley
| Party | Candidate | Votes | % | ±% |
|---|---|---|---|---|
| Conservative | Mike Worthington | 1,939 | 55 | +8 |
| Labour | Mahfooz Ahmad | 688 | 20 | −1 |
| Independent | Ian Whitehouse | 401 | 11 | N/A |
| Liberal Democrats | Geoff Preston | 224 | 6 | +1 |
| Green | Paul Fenton | 139 | 4 | N/A |
| Independent | Keith Harvey | 115 | 3 | N/A |
| Majority | | | | |
| Turnout | | | | |
| Conservative hold | | Swing | | |

=== Leek Rural ===
Leek Rural
| Party | Candidate | Votes | % | ±% |
|---|---|---|---|---|
| Conservative | Gill Heath | 2,441 | 57 | +17 |
| Labour | Philip Barks | 1,020 | 24 | +7 |
| Independent | Linda Malyon | 441 | 10 | −8 |
| Liberal Democrats | Roy Gregg | 180 | 4 | +1 |
| Green | Wendy Bohme | 165 | 4 | N/A |
| Majority | | | | |
| Turnout | | | | |
| Conservative hold | | Swing | | |

=== Leek South Division ===
Leek South
| Party | Candidate | Votes | % | ±% |
|---|---|---|---|---|
| Labour | Charlotte Atkins | 2,204 | 55 | +18 |
| Conservative | Gail Lockett | 1,465 | 37 | +6 |
| Liberal Democrats | Lee Jagger | 182 | 5 | +1 |
| Green | Mike Jones | 155 | 4 | N/A |
| Majority | | | | |
| Turnout | | | | |
| Labour hold | | Swing | | |

== Division results for Borough of Tamworth ==
Spoilt votes not included below.

=== Amington Division ===
Amington
| Party | Candidate | Votes | % | ±% |
|---|---|---|---|---|
| Conservative | Alastair Little | 1,198 | 41 | +10 |
| Labour | Sheree Peaple | 1,183 | 41 | +3 |
| UKIP | Dennis Box | 408 | 14 | −15 |
| Green | Eddie Jones | 109 | 4 | N/A |
| Majority | | | | |
| Turnout | | | | |
| Conservative gain from Labour | | Swing | | |

=== Bolebridge Division ===
Bolebridge
| Party | Candidate | Votes | % | ±% |
|---|---|---|---|---|
| Conservative | Jeremy Oates | 1,297 | 44 | +16 |
| Labour | Carol Dean | 1,182 | 40 | −2 |
| UKIP | John Baker | 263 | 9 | −18 |
| Liberal Democrats | Matt Davies | 127 | 4 | − |
| Green | Lesley Edmunds | 83 | 3 | N/A |
| Majority | | | | |
| Turnout | | | | |
| Conservative gain from Labour | | Swing | | |

=== Perrycrofts Division ===
Perrycrofts
| Party | Candidate | Votes | % | ±% |
|---|---|---|---|---|
| Conservative | Ben Adams | 1,614 | 49 | +14 |
| Labour | Gordon Moore | 1,129 | 34 | +1 |
| UKIP | Jamie Bristoll | 254 | 8 | −17 |
| Liberal Democrats | Jenny Pinkett | 195 | 6 | +2 |
| Green | Nicola Holmes | 102 | 3 | − |
| Majority | | | | |
| Turnout | | | | |
| Conservative hold | | Swing | | |

=== Stonydelph Division ===
Stonydelph
| Party | Candidate | Votes | % | ±% |
|---|---|---|---|---|
| Conservative | Jason Jones | 991 | 42 | +19 |
| Labour | Margaret Clarke | 846 | 36 | +2 |
| UKIP | Robert Bilcliff | 417 | 18 | N/A |
| Green | Sarah Waters | 116 | 5 | − |
| Majority | | | | |
| Turnout | | | | |
| Conservative gain from Independent | | Swing | | |

=== Watling North Division ===
Watling North
| Party | Candidate | Votes | % | ±% |
|---|---|---|---|---|
| Conservative | Tina Clements | 1,462 | 50 | +6 |
| Labour | Brian Jenkins | 1,044 | 36 | −9 |
| UKIP | Paul Smith | 265 | 9 | N/A |
| Green | Wil Goodridge | 127 | 4 | −4 |
| Majority | | | | |
| Turnout | | | | |
| Conservative gain from Labour | | Swing | | |

=== Watling South Division ===
Watling South
| Party | Candidate | Votes | % | ±% |
|---|---|---|---|---|
| Conservative | Michael Greatorex | 1,780 | 59 | +7 |
| Labour | Michelle Abbots | 723 | 24 | −17 |
| UKIP | Paul Biggs | 307 | 10 | N/A |
| Liberal Democrats | Roger Jones | 132 | 4 | −3 |
| Green | Mollie Scharaschkin | 68 | 2 | N/A |
| Majority | | | | |
| Turnout | | | | |
| Conservative hold | | Swing | | |
