= Cannock Chase District Council elections =

Local government elections in Staffordshire, England

Cannock Chase District Council elections are held three years out of every four, with a third of the council elected each time. Cannock Chase District Council is the local authority for the non-metropolitan district of Cannock Chase in Staffordshire, England. Since the last boundary changes in 2002, 41 councillors have been elected from 15 wards.

== Council elections ==
- 1973 Cannock Chase District Council election
- 1976 Cannock Chase District Council election (New ward boundaries)
- 1978 Cannock Chase District Council election
- 1979 Cannock Chase District Council election
- 1980 Cannock Chase District Council election
- 1982 Cannock Chase District Council election
- 1983 Cannock Chase District Council election
- 1984 Cannock Chase District Council election
- 1986 Cannock Chase District Council election
- 1987 Cannock Chase District Council election
- 1988 Cannock Chase District Council election
- 1990 Cannock Chase District Council election
- 1991 Cannock Chase District Council election
- 1992 Cannock Chase District Council election
- 1994 Cannock Chase District Council election
- 1995 Cannock Chase District Council election
- 1996 Cannock Chase District Council election
- 1998 Cannock Chase District Council election
- 1999 Cannock Chase District Council election
- 2000 Cannock Chase District Council election
- 2002 Cannock Chase District Council election (New ward boundaries reduced the number of seats by 1)
- 2003 Cannock Chase District Council election
- 2004 Cannock Chase District Council election
- 2006 Cannock Chase District Council election
- 2007 Cannock Chase District Council election
- 2008 Cannock Chase District Council election
- 2010 Cannock Chase District Council election
- 2011 Cannock Chase District Council election
- 2012 Cannock Chase District Council election
- 2014 Cannock Chase District Council election
- 2015 Cannock Chase District Council election
- 2016 Cannock Chase District Council election
- 2018 Cannock Chase District Council election
- 2019 Cannock Chase District Council election
- 2021 Cannock Chase District Council election
- 2022 Cannock Chase District Council election
- 2023 Cannock Chase District Council election
- 2024 Cannock Chase District Council election (New ward boundaries)
- 2026 Cannock Chase District Council election

== Composition summary ==
The table below shows the number of seats held by each party since the beginning of 2010. This includes district council election results, highlighted in red, as well as defections and by-elections.

Date	Labour	Conservative	Chase Inds	Lib Dem	Greens	UKIP	Independent	Vacant
13 September 2023	18	18		0	5		0	
18 August 2023	17	18		0	5		1	
4 May 2023	17	18		1	5		0	
20 March 2023	12	21	1	2	2		1	2
28 February 2023	12	22	2	2	2		1	
19 February 2023	10	22	3	2	2		2	
5 January 2023	10	23	3	2	2		1	
11 November 2022	9	23	3	2	2		1	1
10 November 2022	9	24	3	2	2		1	
8 September 2022	9	24	3	2	2		1	
1 September 2022	8	23	3	2	2		1	2
11 July 2022	8	24	3	2	2		1	1
5 May 2022	8	25	3	2	2		1	
6 May 2021	8	25	5	2	1		0	
15 June 2020	17	14	5	2	1		1	1
8 June 2020	17	14		2	5		2	1
7 May 2020	18	14		2	5		1	1
2 May 2019	18	15		2	5	0	1	
3 May 2018	21	15		1	3	0	1	
7 September 2017	21	13		1	2	1	3	
18 August 2017	20	15		1	1	1	3	
6 July 2017	21	15		1	1	1	2	
1 September 2016	21	13		1	1	3	2	
5 May 2016	21	13		1	1	4	1	
7 May 2015	22	12		1	0	5	1	
23 May 2014	25	5		3		6	2	
22 May 2014	25	6		3		6	1	
18 February 2014	24	9		3		3	2	
30 July 2013	24	9		4		3	1	
22 July 2013	24	10		4		2	1	
4 July 2013	24	12		4			1	
3 May 2012	24	12		5			0	
February 2012	17	13		9			2	
5 May 2011	17	13		11			0	
26 August 2010	14	10		17			0	
6 May 2010	13	11		17			0	
22 February 2010	14	7		19			1	
26 January 2010	14	9		17			1	
22 January 2010	14	9		18				
18 January 2010	14	10		17				
1 January 2010	14	12		15				

== District result maps ==
2002 results map

2003 results map

2004 results map

2006 results map

2007 results map

2008 results map

2010 results map

2011 results map

2012 results map

2014 results map

2015 results map

2016 results map

2018 results map

2019 results map

2021 results map

2022 results map

2023 results map

2024 results map

2026 results map

== By-election results ==
=== 2002-2006 ===
Hednesford North by-election, 25 November 2004
Party	Candidate	Votes	%	±%
Labour		419	46.4	+14.6
Conservative		248	27.5	+4.0
Liberal Democrats		235	26.0	+3.9
Majority		171	18.9	
Turnout		902	16.9	
Labour hold		Swing		

=== 2006-2010 ===
Hednesford South by-election, 21 June 2007
Party	Candidate	Votes	%	±%
Labour	Gordon Ball	397	45.6	+10.2
Conservative	Kevin Daly	243	27.9	+1.8
Liberal Democrats	Reg Wells	117	13.4	−11.1
Independent	Ron Turville	114	13.1	−0.9
Majority		154	17.7	
Turnout		871	21.1	
Labour hold		Swing		

Cannock West by-election, 12 February 2009
Party	Candidate	Votes	%	±%
Conservative		654	60.6	−14.1
Labour		333	30.8	+5.5
Liberal Democrats		93	8.6	+8.6
Majority		321	29.8	
Turnout		1,080	19.4	
Conservative hold		Swing		

Heath Hayes East and Wimblebury by-election, 15 October 2009
Party	Candidate	Votes	%	±%
Liberal Democrats	Chris Collis	314	30.0	+8.2
Conservative	Michelle Lucas	300	28.6	−10.9
Labour	Brian Gamble	267	25.5	−0.1
BNP	Shaun Grimsley	116	11.1	+11.1
UKIP	Sean Gleeson	51	4.9	+4.9
Majority		14	1.4	
Turnout		1,048	21.0	
Liberal Democrats gain from Labour		Swing		

=== 2010-2014 ===
Heath Hayes East and Wimblebury by-election, 26 August 2010
Party	Candidate	Votes	%	±%
Labour	Diane Todd	418	49.8	+14.1
Conservative	Lisa Pearce	238	28.4	−8.7
Liberal Democrats	Andrew Clark	153	18.2	−9.0
Independent	Ron Turville	30	3.6	+3.6
Majority		180	21.5	
Turnout		839		
Labour gain from Conservative		Swing		

=== 2014-2018 ===
Hednesford Green Heath by-election, 7 September 2017
Party	Candidate	Votes	%	±%
Labour	Linda Tait	359	43.9	+11.1
Conservative	Bryan Jones	301	36.8	−3.7
Green	Robert Branson	86	10.5	+7.4
Chase Independent Party	Ron Turville	42	5.1	−0.2
UKIP	David Percox	29	3.5	−14.7
Majority		58	7.1	
Turnout		821	19.6	
Labour gain from Conservative		Swing		

Hednesford South by-election, 7 September 2017
Party	Candidate	Votes	%	±%
Green	Stuart Crabtree	513	48.3	+42.1
Conservative	Philip Hewitt	311	29.3	−11.9
Labour	Patrick Frondigoun	190	17.9	−13.2
UKIP	John Bernard	48	4.5	−16.9
Majority		202	19.0	
Turnout		1,068	26.06	
Green gain from Conservative		Swing		

=== 2022-2026 ===
Hednesford North by-election, 8 September 2022
Party	Candidate	Votes	%	±%
Labour	Pam Johnson	290	38.1	
Chase Community Independents	Darrell Mawle	228	30.0	
Conservative	Laura Harrison	208	27.3	
Independent	Christopher Harborow	35	4.6	
Majority		62	8.1	
Turnout		761		
Labour gain from Conservative		Swing		

Cannock West by-election, 10 November 2022
Party	Candidate	Votes	%	±%
Conservative	Bill Kenny	688	55.4	
Labour	Steven Thornley	430	34.6	
Green	Eloise Cropp	124	10.0	
Majority		258	20.8	
Turnout		1,242		
Conservative hold		Swing		

Etching Hill and The Heath by-election, 5 January 2023
Party	Candidate	Votes	%	±%
Labour	Darren Foley	422	52.3	
Conservative	Laura Harrison	385	47.7	
Majority		37	4.6	
Turnout		807		
Labour gain from Conservative		Swing		

Norton Canes by-election, 1 May 2025
Party	Candidate	Votes	%	±%
Conservative	Samantha Thompson	1,256	72.8	
Labour	Timothy Frondigoun	469	27.2	
Majority		787	45.6	
Turnout		1,725		
Conservative gain from Labour		Swing		
