= 2008 Cannock Chase District Council election =

2008 English local government election

Map of the 2008 Cannock Chase District Council election

The 2008 Cannock Chase District Council election took place on 1 May 2008 to elect a third of the members of Cannock Chase District Council, the council of Cannock Chase District in England. This was on the same day as the other 2008 United Kingdom local elections. The previous council election took place in 2007 and the following election was held in 2010. In the election, the council stayed under no overall control.

== Results ==
Party	Previous	Seats +/-	2008
Labour	17	▼2	15
Liberal Democrat	14	Steady	14
Conservative	10	▲2	12

== See also ==
- Cannock Chase District Council elections
