= 2023 Cannock Chase District Council election =

2023 English local election

← 2022	4 May 2023	2024 →

17 out of 41 seats to Cannock Chase District Council 21 seats needed for a majority

	First party	Second party	Third party
Leader	Olivia Lyons	Tony Johnson
Party	Conservative	Labour	Green
Last election	25 seats, 42.1%	8 seats, 38.0%	2 seats, 6.1%
Seats before	22 (Note: Including one vacant seat held by Conservative councillor John McMahon prior to his resignation in March 2023.)	12	2
Seats won	4	9	4
Seats after	18	17	5
Seat change	▼4	▲5	▲3
Popular vote	6,626	9,269	3,352
Percentage	32.1%	44.9%	16.2%
Swing	▼10.0%	▲6.9%	▲10.1%
	Fourth party	Fifth party	Sixth party
Party	Liberal Democrats	Independent	Chase Indies
Last election	2 seats, 2.7%	1 seats, 0.9%	3 seats, 9.6%
Seats before	2	1	2 (Note: Including one vacant seat in Hednesford South ward previously held by Chase Community Independents Group councillor Paul Woodhead. The party did not put up any candidates in 2023 and was de-registered with the Electoral Commission the month after this election.)
Seats won	0	0	0
Seats after	1	0	0
Seat change	▼1	▼1	▼2
Popular vote	434	965	n/a
Percentage	2.1%	4.7%	n/a
Swing	▼0.6%	▲3.8%	n/a
- Winner of each seat at the 2023 Cannock Chase District Council election
Leader before election
Olivia Lyons
Conservative
Leader after election
Tony Johnson
Labour
No overall control

The 2023 Cannock Chase District election took place on 4 May 2023 to elect 17 of the 41 councillors on Cannock Chase District Council in Staffordshire, England. on the same day as other local elections in England, including to eight parish councils in the district. The usual nominal third of the council (15 seats, one from each ward) was up for election, plus there were two vacancies to be filled, meaning a total of 17 councillors were elected.

The council was under Conservative majority control prior to the election. The election saw the council go under no overall control, and a coalition of Labour, Green and Liberal Democrat coalition subsequently formed to run the council.

== Background ==
At the previous 2022 election in Cannock Chase, the Conservatives retained the seats they were defending and gained one from Labour, increasing their overall majority. At the 2023 election, they were defending seven seats which they won at the 2019 election. Labour were looking to make gains for the first time since 2016 after being reduced to eight seats, their lowest ever seat total, at the 2022 election. Localist party the Chase Community Independent Group did not put up any candidates at this election; the Green Party were hoping to regain seats in the Hednesford area which they had held before the Chase Indies' formation in 2020. The Liberal Democrats were looking to retain one of two seats they held in the Brereton and Ravenhill ward; they did not field candidates in any other wards.

There had been substantial changes to the makeup of the council since the May 2022 election. Four Conservative councillors had resigned from the council whilst another had defected to Labour; the Conservatives successfully defended their Cannock West seat but lost the Hednesford North and Etching Hill and the Heath by-elections to Labour. This reduced their total from 25 councillors to 21. Meanwhile, the leader of the Chase Community Independent Group resigned his Hednesford South seat shortly before the election was called. This, along with a last minute Conservative resignation in Cannock East, resulted in there being two councillors elected in two of the council's wards.

The outcome of the election was a decisive shift to Labour, with them picking up the highest number of votes and seats for the first time since the 2016 election. Labour gained three seats from the Conservatives, one from the Liberal Democrats, and regained a seat in Cannock North which had been held by a former Labour independent councillor. This boosted their seat count from 12 just before the election to 17. The Conservatives saw their vote share drop by 10% for the second year in a row, leading to them losing three seats and their overall majority. They remained the largest party by a single seat. The Greens regained three seats in Hednesford which had been held by former Green councillors, leaving them with the five seats they had following the 2019 election. The Liberal Democrats lost to Labour in their one remaining ward, reducing them to one seat for the second time in the council's history.

Across the district, there was a substantial 9.7% swing to Labour compared to 2019; compared to 2022, the swing to Labour was a slightly smaller 8.5%.

Following the election a coalition of Labour, the Greens and the Liberal Democrat formed, with Labour group leader Tony Johnson being appointed leader of the council at the subsequent annual council meeting on 24 May 2023.

== Summary ==
=== Election result ===
The overall results were:

2023 Cannock Chase District Council election
Party	This election			Full council			This election		
Party	Seats	Net	Seats %	Other	Total	Total %	Votes	Votes %	+/−
Labour	9	▲5	60.0	8	17	41.5	9,269	44.9	▲6.9
Conservative	4	▼3	26.7	14	18	43.9	6,626	32.1	▼10.0
Green	4	▲3	26.7	1	5	12.2	3,352	16.2	▲10.1
Liberal Democrats	0	▼1	0.0	1	1	2.4	434	2.1	▼0.6
Independent	0	▼1	0.0	0	0	0.0	965	4.7	▲3.8

=== Council Composition ===
Prior to the election, the composition of the council was:

↓
21	12	2	2	1	1	2
Conservative	Labour	LD	Grn	CI	Ind	Vac

After the election, the composition of the council was:

↓
18	17	5	1
Conservative	Labour	Greens	LD

== Ward results ==
Vote share changes are based on the results achieved by parties in 2019 when these seats were last contested.

=== Brereton and Ravenhill ===
Brereton and Ravenhill
Party	Candidate	Votes	%	±%
Labour	Carl Boulton	672	47.6	▲10.1
Liberal Democrats	Gerald Molineux	434	30.7	▼12.2
Conservative	Melanie Frew	306	21.7	▲2.1
Majority		238	16.9	N/A
Turnout		1,412	27.0	▼0.4
Labour gain from Liberal Democrats		Swing	▲11.2	

=== Cannock East ===
Cannock East
Party	Candidate	Votes	%	±%
Labour	Tony Johnson	739	59.1	▲17.0
Labour	Fred Prestwood	622	49.7	▲7.6
Conservative	Gary Millward	408	32.6	▲8.6
Green	Arlene Carmichael	142	11.4	▲2.4
Green	Melody Donnallie	142	11.4	▲2.4
Turnout		1,255	23.5	▼2.6
Labour hold		Swing		
Labour gain from Conservative		Swing		

There were two seats up for election in this ward due to the resignation of Conservative councillor Johnny McMahon in March 2023.

Ward Summary
Party	Votes	% Votes	±%	Seats	Change
Labour	1,361	66.3	▲24.2	2	▲1
Conservative	408	19.9	▼4.1	0	▼1
Green	284	13.8	▲4.8	0	

=== Cannock North ===
Cannock North
Party	Candidate	Votes	%	±%
Labour	Paula Stanton	642	57.3	▲3.8
Conservative	David Guy	268	23.9	▲0.4
Independent	Paul Carnell	126	11.2	N/A
Green	Richard Jenking	85	7.6	▼15.4
Majority		384	33.4	▲3.4
Turnout		1,121	21.1	▼1.2
Labour hold		Swing	▲1.7	

=== Cannock South ===
Cannock South
Party	Candidate	Votes	%	±%
Labour	Jeff Hill	651	46.1	▲7.4
Conservative	Paul Snape	537	38.1	▲6.1
Green	Eloise Cropp	142	10.1	▲1.6
Independent	David Hyden	81	5.7	N/A
Majority		114	8.0	▲1.3
Turnout		1,411	23.4	▼1.1
Labour hold		Swing	▲0.7	

=== Cannock West ===
Cannock West
Party	Candidate	Votes	%	±%
Conservative	Val Jones	976	57.6	▼5.1
Labour	Natalie Hill	537	31.7	▲10.9
Green	Maire Smith	182	10.7	▼5.7
Majority		439	25.9	▼16.1
Turnout		1,695	30.3	▼0.7
Conservative hold		Swing	▼8.0	

=== Etching Hill and the Heath ===
Etching Hill and the Heath
Party	Candidate	Votes	%	±%
Conservative	Mike Sutherland	675	52.2	▼7.8
Labour	Daniel Foceac	470	36.3	▲18.0
Green	Carl Harwatt	149	11.5	▼10.2
Majority		205	15.9	▼22.4
Turnout		1,294	25.6	▼1.1
Conservative hold		Swing	▼12.9	

=== Hagley ===
Hagley
Party	Candidate	Votes	%	±%
Labour Co-op	David Williams	488	63.0	▲26.0
Conservative	Julia Kenny	164	21.2	▼20.2
Independent	Alan Dudson	72	9.3	N/A
Green	Kenny Beardmore	51	6.6	▼15.0
Majority		324	41.8	N/A
Turnout		775	23.0	▲0.5
Labour Co-op gain from Conservative		Swing	▲23.1	

=== Hawks Green ===
Hawks Green
Party	Candidate	Votes	%	±%
Conservative	Adrienne Fitzgerald	618	50.7	▲7.0
Labour	Dale Bilbie	456	37.4	▲20.6
Green	David Green	146	12.0	▲1.9
Majority		162	13.3	▼13.6
Turnout		1,220	22.9	▼0.6
Conservative hold		Swing	▼6.8	

=== Heath Hayes East & Wimblebury ===
Heath Hayes East & Wimblebury
Party	Candidate	Votes	%	±%
Labour	Julie Aston	547	47.2	▲17.0
Conservative	Samantha Thompson	507	43.8	▲6.7
Green	Stuart Kennedy	104	9.0	▼0.7
Majority		40	3.4	N/A
Turnout		1,158	24.5	▼0.4
Labour gain from Conservative		Swing	▲5.2	

=== Hednesford Green Heath ===
Hednesford Green Heath
Party	Candidate	Votes	%	±%
Labour	Mandy Dunnett ^	598	53.8	▲20.9
Conservative	Laura Harrison	408	36.7	▲2.6
Independent	Ron Turville	106	9.5	▲3.1
Majority		190	17.1	N/A
Turnout		1,112	19.7	▼4.8
Labour gain from Conservative		Swing	▲9.2	

^ Mandy Dunnett was the sitting councillor for the Hednesford North ward. She switched to the Hednesford Green Heath ward after defecting to Labour.

=== Hednesford North ===
Hednesford North
Party	Candidate	Votes	%	±%
Green	Darrell Mawle	464	38.5	▼3.2
Labour	Paul Witton	416	34.5	▲3.2
Conservative	Marie Taylor	219	18.2	▼8.8
Independent	Arthur Roden	107	8.9	N/A
Majority		48	4.0	▼6.0
Turnout		1,299	24.7	▲0.3
Green hold		Swing	▼3.2	

Although this was a notional Green hold compared to 2019, in current seat terms it was a Green gain from Labour due to the previous defection of the sitting councillor, Mandy Dunnett, to Labour.

=== Hednesford South ===
Hednesford South
Party	Candidate	Votes	%	±%
Green	Liz Bishop	464	39.0	▼21.7
Green	Mandi Boyer	388	32.6	▼28.1
Conservative	Phil Hewitt	353	29.7	▲2.0
Labour	Bob Heighway	319	26.8	▲15.2
Labour	Steve Thornley	293	24.6	▲13.4
Independent	Andrea Beach ^	197	16.6	N/A
Independent	Chris Harborow	170	14.3	N/A
Turnout		1,193	28.0	▼1.8
Green hold		Swing	▼3.2	
Green gain from Chase Indies		Swing		

^ Andrea Beach was the sitting councillor for the Cannock North ward. She switched to the Hednesford South ward after defecting from Labour to the Chase Community Independent Group, and latterly sitting as an independent.

There were two seats up for election in this ward due to the resignation of Chase Community Independent Group leader Paul Woodhead in March 2023.

Although one of these seats was a notional Green hold compared to 2019, in current seat terms it was a Green gain from the Chase Community Independent Group due to the previous defection of the sitting councillor, Stuart Crabtree, from the Greens.

Ward Summary
Party	Votes	% Votes	±%	Seats	Change
Green	852	39.1	▼21.6	2	▲1
Labour	609	27.9	▲16.3	0	
Independent	367	16.8	N/A	0	
Conservative	353	16.2	▼11.5	0	

=== Norton Canes ===
Norton Canes
Party	Candidate	Votes	%	±%
Labour Co-op	Josh Newbury	1,069	66.9	▲21.9
Conservative	Tim Clapham	357	22.4	▼9.3
Independent	Sean Butler	106	6.6	N/A
Green	Stuart Crabtree	65	4.1	▼1.3
Majority		712	44.5	▲31.2
Turnout		1,597	24.2	▼4.2
Labour Co-op hold		Swing	▲15.6	

=== Rawnsley ===
Rawnsley
Party	Candidate	Votes	%	±%
Green	Andrea Muckley	715	69.8	▲14.0
Conservative	Thomas Yaxley	174	17.0	▼9.4
Labour	Les Bullock	135	13.2	▲0.1
Majority		541	52.8	▲23.4
Turnout		1,024	28.3	▼5.5
Green hold		Swing	▲11.7	

=== Western Springs ===
Western Springs
Party	Candidate	Votes	%	±%
Conservative	Pam Owen	656	47.4	▼6.9
Labour	David Gaye	615	44.4	▲18.3
Green	Warren Cocker	113	8.2	▼11.4
Majority		41	3.0	▼25.2
Turnout		1,384	26.9	▼0.2
Conservative hold		Swing	▼12.6	

== Changes 2023–2024 ==
Paul Fisher, elected as a Liberal Democrat in 2022, left the party in August 2023, leaving the party with no councillors. He subsequently joined Labour later in 2023.

== By-elections 2023-2027 ==
=== Norton Canes, May 2025 ===
Norton Canes ward by-election, 1 May 2025
Party	Candidate	Votes	%	±%
Conservative	Samantha Louise Thompson	1,256	72.81	
Labour	Timothy Paul Frondigoun	469	27.18	
Turnout		1,967	28.83	
Conservative gain from Labour		Swing		

=== Hednesford Green Heath, August 2025 ===
Hednesford Green Heath, 7 August 2025
Party	Candidate	Votes	%	±%
Reform	Paul Jones	525	51.4	
Labour	Alan Pearson	230	22.5	
Conservative	Phil Hewitt	126	12.3	
Green	Rachel Lauren Rock	101	9.9	
Independent	Sharon Denise Jagger	31	3.0	
UKIP	Terry Dryhurst	5	0.5	
TUSC	Gareth Knox	1	0.1	
Turnout		1,022	16.6	
Reform gain from Labour		Swing		
