= 2019 Cannock Chase District Council election =

2019 UK local government election

Map of the results of the 2019 Cannock Chase District Council election. Conservatives in blue, Labour in red, Greens in green and the Liberal Democrats in yellow.

Elections to Cannock Chase District Council took place on 2 May 2019 on the same day as other local elections in England, including to several parish councils in the district. All of the council's wards were up for election, meaning a total of 15 councillors were elected.

Before the election, the Labour Party held control of the council with 21 seats, a majority of one. They were aiming to defend the six seats they won at the 2015 election as well as another in Hednesford Green Heath which they gained at a by-election in September 2017. Labour lost four of the seven seats they were defending and only gained one, meaning they lost their overall majority on the council. Four Labour candidates stood as joint Labour and Co-operative candidates and one was elected adding to the three councillors who also represented the Co-operative Party on the council.

The Conservatives had previously strengthened their position as the largest opposition group on the council at the previous elections and maintained their total of 15 seats. They lost one seat to the Green Party and another to Labour but also gained two seats from Labour, including one of the Hednesford seats they lost in the 2017 by-elections.

The Green Party had not won any seats in 2015 but went on to gain one seat in 2016, one seat in the 2017 by-elections and another in 2018. They retained their by-election seat and gained two seats, one from Labour and another from the Conservatives, to take their total up to five seats.

The Liberal Democrats only fielded two candidates this year: one in Brereton & Ravenhill and one in Rawnsley, both former strongholds of theirs. They succeeded in regaining Brereton & Ravenhill which they had lost to Labour in 2015. UKIP stood in six wards and increased their share of the vote compared to 2018 but did not gain any seats. Two independent candidates also stood but neither were elected.

== Results ==
Cannock Chase District Council election, 2019
Party	Seats	Gains	Losses	Net gain/loss	Seats %	Votes %	Votes	+/−
Conservative	7	2	2	0	46.7	36.9	7,134	0.0
Labour	4	1	4	▼3	28.6	30.3	5,865	▼3.4
Green	3	2	0	▲2	21.4	20.0	3,875	▲15.7
Liberal Democrats	1	1	0	▲1	7.1	3.4	655	▲0.3
UKIP	0	0	0	0	0.0	8.2	1,589	▼12.6
Independent	0	0	0	0	0.0	1.2	237	0.0

=== Council Composition ===
Prior to the election, the composition of the council was:

↓
21	15	3	1	1
Labour	Conservative	Green	LD	Ind

After the election, the composition of the council was:

↓
18	15	5	2	1
Labour	Conservative	Green	LD	Ind

== Ward results ==
Vote share changes are based on the results achieved by parties in 2015 election when these seats were last contested, except from the Hednesford Green Heath and Hednesford South wards which were last contested at by-elections in 2017.

=== Brereton and Ravenhill ===
Brereton and Ravenhill
Party	Candidate	Votes	%	±%
Liberal Democrats	Gerald Molineux	598	42.9	▲19.1
Labour Co-op	Darren Foley	523	37.5	▲5.5
Conservative	Phil Jones	273	19.6	▼2.9
Majority		75	5.4	N/A
Turnout		1,394	27.4	▼36.0
Liberal Democrats gain from Labour Co-op		Swing	▲6.8	

=== Cannock East ===
Cannock East
Party	Candidate	Votes	%	±%
Labour	Tony Johnson	578	42.1	▼3.0
UKIP	Mick Howes	342	24.9	▲2.2
Conservative	Johnny McMahon	329	24.0	▼5.6
Green	Arlette Carmichael	124	9.0	▲6.3
Majority		236	17.2	▲1.7
Turnout		1,373	26.1	▼33.1
Labour hold		Swing	▼2.6	

=== Cannock North ===
Cannock North
Party	Candidate	Votes	%	±%
Labour	Andrea Layton	613	53.5	▲4.7
Conservative	John Dawkins	269	23.5	▼0.5
Green	Jodie Winter	264	23.0	▲19.5
Majority		344	30.0	▲5.2
Turnout		1,146	22.3	▼35.1
Labour hold		Swing	▲2.6	

=== Cannock South ===
Cannock South
Party	Candidate	Votes	%	±%
Labour	John Kraujalis	565	38.7	▼1.3
Conservative	Peter Kruskonjic	467	32.0	▼2.3
UKIP	Kev Whittaker	305	20.9	▼0.6
Green	Scarlett Ward	124	8.5	▲4.3
Majority		98	6.7	▲1.0
Turnout		1,461	24.5	▼32.7
Labour hold		Swing	▲0.5	

=== Cannock West ===
Cannock West
Party	Candidate	Votes	%	±%
Conservative	Val Jones	1,097	62.8	▲8.4
Labour	Michael Holder	363	20.8	▼4.5
Green	Marie Smith	286	16.4	▲12.3
Majority		734	42.0	▲12.9
Turnout		1,746	31.0	▼39.5
Conservative hold		Swing	▲6.5	

=== Etching Hill and the Heath ===
Etching Hill and the Heath
Party	Candidate	Votes	%	±%
Conservative	Mike Sutherland	805	60.0	▲22.3
Green	Michael Sheridan	291	21.7	▲17.3
Labour	Kieran Tait-Green	246	18.3	▼7.9
Majority		514	38.3	▲26.8
Turnout		1,342	26.7	▼39.0
Conservative hold		Swing	▲15.1	

=== Hagley ===
Hagley
Party	Candidate	Votes	%	±%
Conservative	Rob Hughes	299	41.4	▲10.1
Labour	Jess Cooper	267	37.0	▼2.3
Green	Stuart Kennedy	156	21.6	▲19.6
Majority		32	4.4	N/A
Turnout		722	22.5	▼37.3
Conservative gain from Labour		Swing	▲6.2	

=== Hawks Green ===
Hawks Green
Party	Candidate	Votes	%	±%
Conservative	Adrienne Fitzgerald	552	43.7	▼4.2
Labour Co-op	Les Bullock	212	16.8	▼6.4
UKIP	Robert Pitcher	209	16.5	▼5.8
Independent	John Bernard	163	12.9	N/A
Green	David Green	127	10.1	▲5.9
Majority		340	26.9	▲2.2
Turnout		1,263	23.5	▼42.2
Conservative hold		Swing	▲1.1	

=== Heath Hayes East & Wimblebury ===
Heath Hayes East & Wimblebury
Party	Candidate	Votes	%	±%
Conservative	Samantha Thompson	435	37.1	▼1.6
Labour Co-op	Paul Dadge	354	30.2	▼0.7
UKIP	Dave Morris	269	23.0	▲4.8
Green	Ken Beardmore	114	9.7	▲6.6
Majority		81	6.9	▼0.8
Turnout		1,172	24.9	▼40.6
Conservative hold		Swing	▼0.5	

=== Hednesford Green Heath ===
`a

Hednesford Green Heath
Party	Candidate	Votes	%	±%
Conservative	Bryan Jones	391	34.1	▼2.7
Labour	Linda Tait ^	378	32.9	▼11.0
UKIP	Dave Percox	172	15.0	▲11.5
Green	Brian Apter	133	11.6	▲1.1
Independent	Ron Turville	74	6.4	▲1.3
Majority		13	1.2	N/A
Turnout		1,148	24.5	▲4.9
Conservative gain from Labour		Swing	▲6.2	

^ Linda Tait was the sitting councillor for the Hednesford Green Heath ward after gaining it from the Conservatives in a 2017 by-election. Changes to vote shares, turnout and swing is compared with the by-election, not the 2015 election.

=== Hednesford North ===
Hednesford North
Party	Candidate	Votes	%	±%
Green	Mandy Dunnett	517	41.7	▲37.5
Labour	Jacquie Prestwood	389	31.3	▼8.9
Conservative	Diane Bennett	335	27.0	▼3.8
Majority		128	10.4	N/A
Turnout		1,241	24.4	▼36.5
Green gain from Labour		Swing	▲23.2	

=== Hednesford South ===
Hednesford South
Party	Candidate	Votes	%	±%
Green	Stuart Crabtree ^	720	60.7	▲12.4
Conservative	Wendy Yates	329	27.7	▼1.6
Labour	Doris Grice	138	11.6	▼6.3
Majority		391	33.0	▲7.0
Turnout		1,187	29.8	▲10.8
Green hold		Swing	▲7.0	

^ Stuart Crabtree was the sitting councillor for the Hednesford South ward after gaining it from the Conservatives in a 2017 by-election. Changes to vote shares, turnout and swing is compared with the by-election, not the 2015 election.

=== Norton Canes ===
Norton Canes
Party	Candidate	Votes	%	±%
Labour Co-op	Josh Newbury	737	45.0	▲10.1
Conservative	Mike Hoare	519	31.7	▼8.0
UKIP	Paul Allen	292	17.8	▼3.1
Green	Glen Tapper	89	5.4	▲2.8
Majority		218	13.3	N/A
Turnout		1,637	28.4	▼36.4
Labour Co-op gain from Conservative		Swing	▲9.1	

=== Rawnsley ===
Rawnsley
Party	Candidate	Votes	%	±%
Green	Andrea Muckley	672	55.8	▲41.2
Conservative	Philippa Haden	318	26.4	▼6.7
Labour	Mark Deakin	158	13.1	▼17.0
Liberal Democrats	Pat Ansell	57	4.7	▲1.6
Majority		354	29.4	N/A
Turnout		1,205	33.8	▼34.4
Green gain from Conservative		Swing	▲24.0	

=== Western Springs ===
Western Springs
Party	Candidate	Votes	%	±%
Conservative	Anthony Boucker	716	54.3	▲13.6
Labour	David Gaye	344	26.1	▼4.4
Green	Warren Cocker	258	19.6	▲16.4
Majority		372	28.2	▲18.0
Turnout		1,318	27.1	▼35.2
Conservative hold		Swing	▲9.0	
