= 2021 Cannock Chase District Council election =

2021 UK local government election

Map of the results of the 2021 Cannock Chase District Council election. Conservatives in blue and the Chase Community Independents Group in dark green. White areas indicate wards where no seat was up for election.

Elections to Cannock Chase District Council took place on 6 May 2021 on the same day as the Staffordshire County council election and other local elections in England. These elections were due to take place on 7 May 2020 but were delayed by 12 months due to the coronavirus pandemic. All but two of the council's wards were up for election, meaning a total of 13 councillors were elected.

Before the election, the Labour Party held control of the council with a minority administration supported by an independent councillor (who was elected as Labour) and two Liberal Democrat councillors. They were defending eight seats and hoping to regain another following a defection. The Conservatives were looking to build on modest gains made at the 2018 election to increase the size of their 14-strong group. Since the 2019 election, a new localist party, the Chase Community Independent Group, was created consisting of four former Green Party councillors and one former Labour councillor; they were defending their group leader's Hednesford South seat which he previously won as a Green. The Liberal Democrats were aiming for a third consecutive victory in the Brereton & Ravenhill ward.

The result was a landslide victory for the Conservatives who won all but one of the 13 seats up for election. They gained seats in wards previously considered safe for the Labour Party and gained the first ever Conservative overall majority in Cannock Chase District Council's 48-year history. They also won more than 50% of all votes cast, the first time the Conservatives have achieved this feat on this council and the first time any party has achieved it since the Labour Party racked up 53.6% in 2012.

== Results ==
Cannock Chase District Council election, 2021
Party	Seats	Gains	Losses	Net gain/loss	Seats %	Votes %	Votes	+/−
Conservative	12	9	0	▲9	92.3	52.6	10,550	▲25.1
Chase Indies	1	0	0	0	7.7	11.5	2,307	New
Labour	0	0	9	▼9	0.0	29.3	5,866	▼7.6
Green	0	0	0	0	0.0	4.2	846	▼2.7
Liberal Democrats	0	0	0	0	0.0	1.6	316	▼1.7
Independent	0	0	0	0	0.0	0.4	87	New
Reform UK	0	0	0	0	0.0	0.4	70	New

=== Council Composition ===
Prior to the election, the composition of the council was:

↓
17	14	5	2	1	1	1
Labour	Conservative	Chase Indies	LD	Grn	Ind	Vac

After the election, the composition of the council was:

↓
24	9	5	2	1
Conservative	Labour	Chase Indies	LD	Grn

== Ward results ==
Vote share changes are based on the results achieved by parties in 2016 when these seats were last contested.

=== Brereton and Ravenhill ===
Brereton and Ravenhill
Party	Candidate	Votes	%	±%
Conservative	Louis Arduino	634	42.0	▲27.3
Labour	Alan Dudson	498	33.0	▲1.4
Liberal Democrats	Peter Johnson	316	20.9	▼10.5
Green	David Green	63	4.2	▲1.9
Majority		136	9.0	N/A
Turnout		1,511	28.8	▼1.2
Conservative gain from Labour		Swing	▲13.0	

=== Cannock East ===
Cannock East
Party	Candidate	Votes	%	±%
Conservative	Johnny McMahon	732	50.9	▲30.4
Labour Co-op	Christine Mitchell	597	41.5	▼3.1
Green	Joanne Elson	108	7.5	▲4.8
Majority		135	9.4	N/A
Turnout		1,437	27.4	▼2.7
Conservative gain from Labour		Swing	▲16.8	

=== Cannock North ===
Cannock North
Party	Candidate	Votes	%	±%
Conservative	Phil Jones	591	45.6	▲31.5
Labour	Jacquie Prestwood	573	44.2	▼9.0
Green	Jordan Morris	131	10.1	▲5.3
Majority		18	1.4	N/A
Turnout		1,295	24.4	▼1.7
Conservative gain from Labour		Swing	▲20.3	

=== Cannock South ===
Cannock South
Party	Candidate	Votes	%	±%
Conservative	Peter Kruskonjic	794	50.8	▲24.5
Labour	Jessica Cooper	489	31.3	▼15.3
Chase Indies	Sarah Findlay	203	13.0	N/A
Green	Matthew Jackson	77	4.9	▲2.0
Majority		305	19.5	N/A
Turnout		1,563	25.8	▼1.9
Conservative gain from Labour		Swing	▲19.9	

=== Cannock West ===
Cannock West
Party	Candidate	Votes	%	±%
Conservative	Doug Smith	1,479	69.3	▲17.8
Labour	Michael Holder	393	18.4	▼8.4
Chase Indies	Sharon Jagger	154	7.2	N/A
Green	Maire Smith	107	5.0	▼0.4
Majority		1,086	50.9	▲26.2
Turnout		2,133	37.2	▲3.3
Conservative hold		Swing	▲13.1	

=== Etching Hill and the Heath ===
Etching Hill and the Heath
Party	Candidate	Votes	%	±%
Conservative	Justin Johnson	1,189	68.1	▲35.4
Labour Co-op	Darren Foley	427	24.4	▼1.0
Green	Michael Sheridan	131	7.5	▲4.4
Majority		762	43.6	▲40.3
Turnout		1,747	34.0	▲4.5
Conservative hold		Swing	▲18.2	

=== Hagley ===
Hagley
Party	Candidate	Votes	%	±%
Conservative	Nick Lyons	389	43.7	▲23.2
Labour Co-op	Christine Martin	298	33.4	▼14.5
Chase Indies	Ian Pyke	179	20.1	N/A
Green	Stuart Kennedy	25	2.8	▼1.4
Majority		91	10.3	N/A
Turnout		891	27.0	▲1.0
Conservative gain from Labour		Swing	▲18.9	

=== Hawks Green ===
Hawks Green
Party	Candidate	Votes	%	±%
Conservative	Philippa Haden	909	56.5	▲20.5
Chase Indies	Paul Dadge	432	26.9	N/A
Labour Co-op	Les Bullock	267	16.6	▼11.2
Majority		477	29.7	▲24.9
Turnout		1,608	29.7	▲5.2
Conservative hold		Swing	▼3.2	

=== Heath Hayes East & Wimblebury ===
Heath Hayes East & Wimblebury
Party	Candidate	Votes	%	±%
Conservative	Lisa Wilson	746	54.0	▲29.4
Labour	Diane Todd	439	31.8	▼8.3
Chase Indies	Jodie Ashford	147	10.6	N/A
Green	Ken Beardmore	49	3.5	▼2.2
Majority		307	22.2	N/A
Turnout		1,381	28.6	▲2.1
Conservative gain from Labour		Swing	▲18.9	

=== Hednesford North ===
Hednesford North
Party	Candidate	Votes	%	±%
Conservative	Matt McCall	634	39.3	▲17.5
Labour	Alan Pearson	537	33.3	▼14.6
Chase Indies	Darrell Mawle	441	27.4	N/A
Majority		97	6.0	N/A
Turnout		1,612	30.5	▲2.9
Conservative gain from Labour		Swing	▲16.1	

=== Hednesford South ===
Hednesford South
Party	Candidate	Votes	%	±%
Chase Indies	Paul Woodhead ^	680	49.4	N/A
Conservative	Josh Bancroft	505	36.7	▲14.5
Labour	Ryan Tipton	192	13.9	▼6.6
Majority		175	12.7	▼7.7
Turnout		1,404	33.5	▼2.2
Chase Indies hold		Swing	▼3.9	

^ Paul Woodhead was the sitting councillor for the Hednesford South ward and previously defected from the Greens to the newly formed Chase Community Independents Group. Changes to his majority and swing are calculated based on his 2016 result.

=== Norton Canes ===
Norton Canes
Party	Candidate	Votes	%	±%
Conservative	Mike Hoare	1,013	55.6	▲25.0
Labour	Zaphne Stretton	610	33.5	▼5.9
Chase Indies	Linda Mawle	71	3.9	N/A
Reform UK	Paul Allen	70	3.8	N/A
Green	Glen Tapper	57	3.1	▼0.4
Majority		403	22.1	N/A
Turnout		1,821	29.1	▼0.7
Conservative gain from Labour		Swing	▲15.5	

=== Western Springs ===
Western Springs
Party	Candidate	Votes	%	±%
Conservative	Charlie Frew	935	56.1	▲24.5
Labour	David Gaye	546	32.8	▼2.1
Green	Warren Cocker	98	5.9	▲0.9
Independent	Niamh Mahon	87	5.2	N/A
Majority		389	23.3	N/A
Turnout		1,666	32.0	▲3.5
Conservative gain from Labour		Swing	▲15.5	
