= 2022 Cannock Chase District Council election =

2022 UK local government election

← 2021	5 May 2022	2023 →

13 out of 41 seats to Cannock Chase District Council 21 seats needed for a majority

	First party	Second party	Third party
Party	Conservative	Labour	Chase Indies
Last election	24 seats, 52.6%	9 seats, 29.3%	5 seats, 11.5%
Seats before	24	9	4
Seats won	6	5	0
Seats after	25	8	3
Seat change	▲1	▼1	▼1
Popular vote	7,675	6,929	1,750
Percentage	42.1%	38.0%	9.6%
Swing	▼10.5%	▲8.7%	▼1.9%
	Fourth party	Fifth party	Sixth party
Party	Green	Liberal Democrats	Independent
Last election	1 seat, 4.2%	2 seats, 1.6%	1 seat, 0.4%
Seats before	1	2	1
Seats won	1	1	0
Seats after	2	2	1
Seat change	▲1	Steady	Steady
Popular vote	1,112	498	167
Percentage	6.1%	2.7%	0.9%
Swing	▲1.9%	▲1.1%	▲0.5%
- Winner of each seat at the 2022 Cannock Chase District Council election
Council control before election
Conservative
Council control after election
Conservative

Elections to Cannock Chase District Council took place on 5 May 2022 on the same day as other local elections in England, Scotland and Wales. All but two of the council's wards were up for election, meaning a total of 13 councillors were elected.

At the previous local election in Cannock Chase, the Conservatives won their first overall majority in the history of the council. They were defending five seats and hoping to gain further seats in order to expand their majority. Labour had suffered a complete wipeout in 2021, losing all of the nine seats they were defending; they were therefore hoping to bounce back from this result and retain the six wards they won in 2018. One councillor who had defected from the Green Party to the localist Chase Community Independent Group stood down, with the latter opting not to contest that seat; the Chase Indies instead hoped to make gains elsewhere. The Liberal Democrats were defending one seat and did not field a candidate in any other wards.

The result was a minimal change compared to when these seats were last contested in 2018. The Conservatives held their five wards and gained one from Labour who in turn held their remaining five seats. It was no change elsewhere in the district: the Green Party regained the Rawnsley ward and the Liberal Democrats held their Brereton and Ravenhill seat. Across the district, there was a small 1% swing to Labour compared to 2018; compared to 2021, the swing to Labour was 9.6%, reflecting the substantial change since the Conservatives' landslide victory.

== Summary ==
=== Election results ===
2022 Cannock Chase District Council election
Party	This election			Full council			This election		
Party	Seats	Net	Seats %	Other	Total	Total %	Votes	Votes %	+/−
Conservative	6	▲1	46.2	19	25	61.0	7,675	42.1	–10.5
Labour	5	▼1	38.5	3	8	19.5	6,929	38.0	+8.7
Chase Indies	0	▼1	0.0	3	3	7.3	1,750	9.6	–1.9
Green	1	▲1	7.7	1	2	4.9	1,112	6.1	+1.9
Liberal Democrats	1	Steady	7.7	1	2	4.9	498	2.7	+1.1
Independent	0	Steady	0.0	1	1	2.4	167	0.9	+0.5
Reform UK	0	Steady	0.0	0	0	0.0	87	0.4	N/A

=== Council Composition ===
Prior to the election, the composition of the council was:

↓
24	9	4	2	1	1
Conservative	Labour	Chase Indies	LD	Grn	Ind

After the election, the composition of the council was:

↓
25	8	3	2	2	1
Conservative	Labour	Chase Inds	LD	Grn	Ind

== Ward results ==
Vote share changes are based on the results achieved by parties in 2018 when these seats were last contested.

=== Brereton and Ravenhill ===
Brereton and Ravenhill
Party	Candidate	Votes	%	±%
Liberal Democrats	Paul Fisher	498	36.8	▼2.9
Labour	Alan Dudson	473	35.0	▲6.0
Conservative	Toby Ashcroft	316	28.2	▲2.1
Majority		25	1.8	N/A
Turnout		1,353	25.9	▼3.9
Liberal Democrats hold		Swing	▼4.5	

=== Cannock East ===
Cannock East
Party	Candidate	Votes	%	±%
Labour	Jacquie Prestwood	614	45.0	▼4.9
Conservative	Hayley Rushton	596	43.7	▲6.6
Chase Indies	Samuel Mawle	85	6.2	N/A
Green	Richard Jenking	68	7.5	▲2.5
Majority		18	1.3	▼11.5
Turnout		1,363	25.6	▼0.1
Labour hold		Swing	▼5.8	

=== Cannock North ===
Cannock North
Party	Candidate	Votes	%	±%
Labour	Sue Thornley	569	45.9	▼16.2
Conservative	Lois Manning	362	29.2	▲0.6
Independent	Chris Harborow	167	13.5	N/A
Chase Indies	Karl Perry	74	6.0	N/A
Green	Carl Harwatt	69	5.6	▼3.7
Majority		207	16.7	▼16.8
Turnout		1,241	23.6	▼2.1
Labour hold		Swing	▼8.4	

=== Cannock South ===
Cannock South
Party	Candidate	Votes	%	±%
Labour	Alan Pearson	651	44.6	▼1.7
Conservative	Bill Kenny	636	43.5	▲4.3
Chase Indies	Ian Wallace	174	11.9	N/A
Majority		15	1.1	▼6.0
Turnout		1,461	24.1	▼0.5
Labour hold		Swing	▼3.0	

=== Cannock West ===
Cannock West
Party	Candidate	Votes	%	±%
Conservative	Josh Bancroft	1,145	59.9	▼9.5
Labour	Steve Thornley	527	27.6	▲3.6
Chase Indies	Sarah Findlay	135	7.1	N/A
Green	Marie Smith	105	5.5	▼1.1
Majority		618	32.3	▼13.1
Turnout		1,912	33.8	0.0
Conservative hold		Swing	▼6.6	

=== Etching Hill and the Heath ===
Etching Hill and the Heath
Party	Candidate	Votes	%	±%
Conservative	James Fletcher	728	48.0	▼7.4
Labour Co-op	Darren Foley	535	35.3	▲9.0
Chase Indies	Ian Pyke	150	9.9	N/A
Green	Michael Sheridan	131	6.8	▼0.8
Majority		193	12.7	▼16.4
Turnout		1,516	29.8	▲2.0
Conservative hold		Swing	▼8.2	

=== Hawks Green ===
Hawks Green
Party	Candidate	Votes	%	±%
Conservative	Paris Theodorou	626	45.6	▼13.5
Chase Indies	Paul Dadge	359	26.1	N/A
Labour	Pam Johnson	328	23.9	▼4.0
Green	Warren Cocker	60	4.4	▼2.6
Majority		267	19.5	▼11.7
Turnout		1,373	25.4	▲2.7
Conservative hold		Swing	▼19.8	

=== Heath Hayes East & Wimblebury ===
Heath Hayes East & Wimblebury
Party	Candidate	Votes	%	±%
Conservative	Martyn Buttery	478	41.5	▼2.4
Labour	Diane Todd	413	35.9	▼2.3
Chase Indies	Jodie Ashford	215	18.7	N/A
Green	Stuart Kennedy	46	3.5	▼3.0
Majority		65	5.4	N/A
Turnout		1,152	24.1	▼0.4
Conservative hold		Swing	▼0.1	

=== Hednesford Green Heath ===
Hednesford Green Heath
Party	Candidate	Votes	%	±%
Conservative	Paul Jones	474	42.1	▲0.2
Labour	Jeff Hill	421	37.4	▼10.3
Chase Indies	Jacob Huggins	158	14.0	N/A
Green	David Green	72	6.4	▲0.9
Majority		53	4.7	N/A
Turnout		1,125	20.6	▼7.5
Conservative gain from Labour		Swing	▼5.3	

=== Hednesford North ===
Hednesford North
Party	Candidate	Votes	%	±%
Labour	Sheila Cartwright	473	36.4	▼9.6
Conservative	Roger Wootton	426	32.8	▼1.4
Chase Indies	Darrell Mawle	400	30.8	N/A
Majority		47	3.6	▼8.2
Turnout		1,299	24.5	▼1.7
Labour hold		Swing	▼4.1	

=== Norton Canes ===
Norton Canes
Party	Candidate	Votes	%	±%
Labour Co-op	John Preece	1,060	61.5	▲7.5
Conservative	Tim Clapham	576	33.5	▼8.5
Reform UK	Paul Allen	87	5.0	N/A
Majority		482	28.0	▲16.0
Turnout		1,725	26.6	▼4.2
Labour Co-op hold		Swing	▲8.0	

=== Rawnsley ===
Rawnsley
Party	Candidate	Votes	%	±%
Green	Jo Elson	589	53.9	▲17.2
Conservative	Laura Harrison	326	29.8	▼3.8
Labour	Dave Galaska	178	16.3	▼8.9
Majority		263	24.1	▲21.0
Turnout		1,093	30.4	▼4.9
Green hold		Swing	▲10.5	

=== Western Springs ===
Western Springs
Party	Candidate	Votes	%	±%
Conservative	Olivia Lyons	918	57.2	▲5.4
Labour	David Gaye	687	42.8	▲20.1
Majority		231	14.4	▼14.7
Turnout		1,605	31.2	▼0.6
Conservative hold		Swing	▼7.4	
