= 2010 Cannock Chase District Council election =

2010 English local government election

Map of the 2010 Cannock Chase District Council election

The 2010 Cannock Chase District Council election took place on 6 May 2010 to elect a third of the members of Cannock Chase District Council, the council of Cannock Chase District in England. This was on the same day as the other local elections across England as well as the 2010 United Kingdom general election. The previous council election took place in 2007 and the following election was held in 2011. In the election, the council stayed under no overall control with the Liberal Democrats as the largest party.

== Results ==
Party	Previous	Seats +/-	2010
Liberal Democrats	17	▼2	15
Labour	14	▼1	13
Conservative	8	▲3	11
Other	2	Steady	2

== See also ==
- Cannock Chase District Council elections
