= 2018 Cannock Chase District Council election =

2018 UK local government election

Map of the results of the 2018 Cannock Chase District Council election. Labour in red, Conservatives in blue, Greens in green and the Liberal Democrats in yellow. White areas indicate wards where no seat was up for election.

Elections to Cannock Chase District Council took place on 3 May 2018 on the same day as other local elections in England. A third of the council was up for election, meaning a total of 13 councillors were elected from all but two of the council's wards.

The Labour Party held control of the council by maintaining its slim majority of one. Labour held the six seats they previously won at the 2014 election but did not gain any seats from other parties. Unlike previous years, several Labour candidates stood as joint Labour and Co-operative candidates and three were elected, giving the Co-operative Party its first representation on the council.

The Conservatives strengthened their position as the largest opposition group on the council by increasing their number to 15 councillors. They were the main beneficiaries from the collapse in the UKIP vote, increasing their share by just over 20% which reversed the ground they had lost to UKIP at the 2014 election. Their numbers were previously boosted by the defection of two sitting UKIP councillors whose four-year terms were coming to an end; they held onto their seats in these areas whilst also gaining a seat from UKIP and another from an independent in Rugeley, leaving them with four gains. The Conservatives received the highest number of votes but won one seat less than Labour due to their large majorities compared with most Labour-held seats.

Meanwhile, the Green Party were the only other party to gain a seat at this election after winning the Rawnsley ward which had previously been held by UKIP; this was the only direct Green gain from UKIP in the whole country and increased the size of the Green group on the council to three. The Greens stood candidates in all but two wards and gained a higher share of the vote than in 2015 and 2016.

The Liberal Democrats fielded three candidates in their former stronghold of Rugeley. They held onto their last remaining seat in Brereton & Ravenhill but their vote continued to decline in other areas. UKIP stood candidates in seven wards but were not successful in maintaining their seat in Heath Hayes East & Wimblebury or regaining the other three seats they won in 2014. UKIP's share of the vote plummeted by 30%, dropping by as much as 37% in some wards where they stood a candidate. There were two independent candidates, including the sitting councillor for the Western Springs ward who lost his seat to Conservatives.

== Results ==
Cannock Chase District Council election, 2018
Party	Seats	Gains	Losses	Net gain/loss	Seats %	Votes %	Votes	+/−
Labour	6	0	0	0	46.1	38.0	7,112	▲3.0
Conservative	5	4	0	▲4	38.5	44.0	8,235	▲20.2
Green	1	1	0	▲1	7.7	8.4	1,569	N/A
Liberal Democrats	1	0	0	0	7.7	4.3	817	▼1.3
UKIP	0	0	4	▼4	0.0	3.2	608	▼30.1
Independent	0	0	1	▼1	0.0	2.1	391	▼0.2

=== Council Composition ===
Prior to the election, the composition of the council was:

↓
21	13	3	2	1	1
Labour	Conservative	Ind	Green	UKIP	LD

After the election, the composition of the council was:

↓
21	15	3	1	1
Labour	Conservative	Green	LD	Ind

== Ward results ==
Vote share changes are based on the results achieved by parties in 2014 when these seats were last contested.

=== Brereton and Ravenhill ===
Brereton and Ravenhill
Party	Candidate	Votes	%	±%
Liberal Democrats	Paul Fisher	614	39.7	▲0.2
Labour	Jacquie Prestwood	449	29.0	▼2.3
Conservative	Lorraine Northway	404	26.1	N/A
UKIP	Sarah Thomas-Dean	80	5.2	▼24.0
Majority		169	10.7	▲2.5
Turnout		1,547	29.8	▼0.5
Liberal Democrats hold		Swing	▲1.3	

=== Cannock East ===
Cannock East
Party	Candidate	Votes	%	±%
Labour Co-op	Muriel Davis	680	49.9	▲3.9
Conservative	Johnny McMahon	505	37.1	▲20.1
UKIP	Mick Howes	109	8.0	▼29.0
Green	Arlette Carmichael	68	5.0	N/A
Majority		175	12.8	▲3.8
Turnout		1,362	25.7	▼4.1
Labour Co-op hold		Swing	▼8.1	

=== Cannock North ===
Cannock North
Party	Candidate	Votes	%	±%
Labour	Frank Allen	791	62.1	▲11.2
Conservative	Petar Kruskonjic	364	28.6	▲15.7
Green	Jodie Winter	118	9.3	N/A
Majority		427	33.5	▲5.7
Turnout		1,273	25.7	▼2.1
Labour hold		Swing	▼2.3	

=== Cannock South ===
Cannock South
Party	Candidate	Votes	%	±%
Labour	Paul Witton	679	46.3	▲4.1
Conservative	John Dawkins	575	39.2	▲16.7
UKIP	Kev Whittaker	123	8.4	▼27.0
Green	Scarlett Ward	89	6.1	N/A
Majority		104	7.1	▲0.3
Turnout		1,466	24.6	▼2.0
Labour hold		Swing	▼6.3	

=== Cannock West ===
Cannock West
Party	Candidate	Votes	%	±%
Conservative	Hyra Sutton	1,335	69.4	▲24.1
Labour	Edmund Frondigoun	462	24.0	▼1.5
Green	Marie Smith	128	6.6	N/A
Majority		873	45.4	▲29.3
Turnout		1,925	33.8	▼1.4
Conservative hold		Swing	▲12.8	

=== Etching Hill and the Heath ===
Etching Hill and the Heath
Party	Candidate	Votes	%	±%
Conservative	Paul Startin	797	55.4	▲23.8
Labour	Jeff Winter	379	26.3	▲4.1
Liberal Democrats	Pat Ansell	153	10.6	▼2.7
Green	Michael Sheridan	110	7.6	N/A
Majority		418	29.1	N/A
Turnout		1,439	27.8	▼0.6
Conservative gain from UKIP		Swing	▲9.9	

=== Hawks Green ===
Hawks Green
Party	Candidate	Votes	%	±%
Conservative	Phil Hewitt	727	59.1	▲27.5
Labour Co-op	Josh Mills	344	27.9	▲2.5
Green	Eloise Cropp	86	7.0	N/A
UKIP	Dave Percox	74	6.0	▼37.0
Majority		383	31.2	N/A
Turnout		1,231	22.7	▼3.6
Conservative gain from UKIP		Swing	▲9.9	

=== Heath Hayes East & Wimblebury ===
Heath Hayes East & Wimblebury
Party	Candidate	Votes	%	±%
Conservative	Martyn Buttery	512	43.9	▲22.9
Labour Co-op	Les Bullock	445	38.2	▲4.7
UKIP	Dave Morris	132	11.3	▼30.8
Green	Kenny Beardmore	76	6.5	N/A
Majority		67	5.7	N/A
Turnout		1,165	24.5	▼5.2
Conservative gain from UKIP		Swing	▲26.9	

=== Hednesford Green Heath ===
Hednesford Green Heath
Party	Candidate	Votes	%	±%
Labour Co-op	George Adamson	591	47.7	▲4.7
Conservative	Bryan Jones	519	41.9	▲18.7
Green	Andrea Muckley	68	5.5	N/A
UKIP	Marg Dean	31	2.5	▼25.0
Independent	Ron Turville	29	2.3	▼4.0
Majority		72	5.8	▼9.7
Turnout		1,238	28.1	▼3.1
Labour Co-op hold		Swing	▼7.0	

=== Hednesford North ===
Hednesford North
Party	Candidate	Votes	%	±%
Labour	Sheila Cartwright	635	46.0	▲5.5
Conservative	Wendy Yates	472	34.2	▲9.6
Green	Mandy Dunnett	274	19.8	N/A
Majority		163	11.8	▲6.2
Turnout		1,381	26.2	▼3.8
Labour hold		Swing	▼2.1	

=== Norton Canes ===
Norton Canes
Party	Candidate	Votes	%	±%
Labour Co-op	John Preece	960	54.0	▲12.9
Conservative	Adrienne Fitzgerald	747	42.0	▲16.6
Green	Glen Tapper	72	4.0	N/A
Majority		213	12.0	▲2.9
Turnout		1,779	30.8	▲0.7
Labour Co-op hold		Swing	▼1.9	

=== Rawnsley ===
Rawnsley
Party	Candidate	Votes	%	±%
Green	Claire Wilkinson	480	36.7	N/A
Conservative	Val Jones	439	33.6	▲6.7
Labour	Aaron Bate	329	25.2	▼8.3
UKIP	Mick Jackson	59	4.5	▼31.2
Majority		41	3.1	N/A
Turnout		1,307	35.3	▲2.7
Green gain from UKIP		Swing	▲34.0	

=== Western Springs ===
Western Springs
Party	Candidate	Votes	%	±%
Conservative	Olivia Lyons	839	51.8	▲29.9
Labour	Kieran Green	368	22.7	▲0.6
Independent	Mick Grocott	362	22.4	▼2.2
Liberal Democrats	Ken Ansell	50	3.1	▼8.7
Majority		471	29.1	N/A
Turnout		1,619	31.8	▲3.2
Conservative gain from Independent		Swing	▲16.1	
