= 2024 Cannock Chase District Council election =

2024 English local election

← 2023	2 May 2024	2026 →

All 36 seats to Cannock Chase District Council 19 seats needed for a majority

	Majority party	Minority party	Third party
Leader	Tony Johnson	Olivia Lyons	Andrea Muckley
Party	Labour	Conservative	Green
Last election	17 seats, 44.9%	18 seats, 32.1%	4 seats, 16.2%
Seats before	18	18	5
Seats after	21	10	5
Seat change	▲3	▼8	0
Popular vote	23,278	17,022	8,796
Percentage	44.6%	32.6%	16.8%
Swing	▼0.3%	▲0.5%	▲0.6%
- Winner of each seat at the 2024 Cannock Chase District Council election
Leader before election
Tony Johnson
Labour
No overall control
Leader after election
Tony Johnson
Labour

The 2024 Cannock Chase District Council election took place on Thursday 2 May 2024 to elect councillors on Cannock Chase District Council in Staffordshire. All 36 seats on the council were elected following boundary changes. This election was held on the same day as other local elections in England and the election of Staffordshire's Police, Fire and Crime Commissioner.

== Background ==
Prior to the election, the council was under no overall control, being run by a coalition of Labour and the Greens, led by Labour councillor Tony Johnson.

After a review of the council's ward boundaries, the number of councillors was reduced from 41 to 36 and the number of wards was reduced from 15 to 12. This means that each ward will now elect exactly three councillors.

== Boundary changes ==
Cannock Chase usually elects its councillors in thirds, on a four-year cycle. However, following boundary changes, all councillors will be elected to the new wards. The first-placed candidate will receive a four-year term, the second-placed candidate will receive a three-year term and the third-placed candidate will receive a two-year term.

Old wards	No. of seats	New wards	No. of seats
Brereton and Ravenhill	3	Brereton and Ravenhill	3
Cannock East	3	Chadsmoor	3
Cannock North	3	Cannock Longford and Bridgtown	3
Cannock South	3	Cannock Park and Old Fallow	3
Cannock West	3	Etching Hill and the Heath	3
Etching Hill and The Heath	3	Hawks Green with Rumer Hill	3
Hagley	2	Heath Hayes and Wimblebury	3
Hawks Green	3	Hednesford Green Heath	3
Heath Hayes East and Wimblebury	3	Hednesford Hills and Rawnsley	3
Hednesford Green Heath	2	Hednesford Pye Green	3
Hednesford North	3	Norton Canes	3
Hednesford South	2	Western Springs	3
Norton Canes	3		
Rawnsley	2		
Western Springs	3		

== Previous council composition ==
After 2023 election		Before 2024 election		After 2024 election	
Party	Seats	Party	Seats	Party	Seats
Labour	17	Labour	18	Labour	21
Conservative	18	Conservative	18	Conservative	10
Green	5	Green	5	Green	5
Liberal Democrats	1	Liberal Democrats	0	Liberal Democrats	0

Changes 2023–2024:

- Paul Fisher joins Labour from Liberal Democrats

== Results ==
Labour won 21 of the seats on the council, giving them an overall majority.

Vote share changes are compared with the 2023 election.

2024 Cannock Chase District Council election
Party	Seats	Gains	Losses	Net gain/loss	Seats %	Votes %	Votes	+/−
Labour	21	N/A	N/A	▲3	58.3	44.6	23,278	▼0.3
Conservative	10	N/A	N/A	▼8	27.8	32.6	17,022	▲0.5
Green	5	N/A	N/A	0	13.9	16.8	8,796	▲0.6
Reform UK	0	N/A	N/A	0	0.0	3.5	1,799	N/A
Independent	0	N/A	N/A	0	0.0	2.2	1,149	N/A
TUSC	0	N/A	N/A	0	0.0	0.3	169	N/A

== Ward results ==
An asterisk denotes an incumbent councillor seeking re-election. Ward-level comparison with previous years is not possible due to new ward boundaries being introduced.

=== Brereton and Ravenhill ===
Brereton and Ravenhill
Party	Candidate	Votes	%	±%
Labour Co-op	Carl Boulton*	916	64.8	
Labour Co-op	Paul Fisher*	903	63.9	
Labour Co-op	David Williams*	709	50.2	
Independent	Gerald Molineux	451	31.9	
Conservative	Julia Kenny	303	21.4	
Conservative	John Parkes	267	18.9	
Conservative	Keeren Hart	264	18.7	
Green	Laura Jackson	160	11.3	
Green	Claire Wilkinson	135	9.6	
Green	Kevin Elson	132	9.3	
Turnout		1,559	23.4	
Registered electors		6,665		
Labour Co-op hold				
Labour Co-op hold				
Labour Co-op gain from Conservative				

=== Cannock Longford and Bridgtown ===
Cannock Longford and Bridgtown
Party	Candidate	Votes	%	±%
Labour	Maureen Freeman	793	48.4	
Labour	Jeff Hill*	751	45.9	
Conservative	Richard Craddock	697	42.6	
Labour	Alan Pearson*	675	41.2	
Conservative	Paul Snape	658	40.2	
Conservative	Peter Kruskonjic*	651	39.8	
Green	Arlette Carmichael	258	15.8	
Green	Eloise Cropp	238	14.5	
Green	Dylan Kennedy	191	11.7	
Turnout		1,785	25.4	
Registered electors		7,030		
Labour win (new seat)				
Labour win (new seat)				
Conservative win (new seat)				

=== Cannock Park and Old Fallow ===
Cannock Park and Old Fallow
Party	Candidate	Votes	%	±%
Conservative	Val Jones*	719	46.5	
Conservative	Joshua Bancroft*	713	46.1	
Labour	Steve Thornley	626	40.5	
Labour	Natalie Hill	609	39.4	
Conservative	Bill Kenny*	599	38.7	
Labour	Paula Stanton*	585	37.8	
Reform UK	Paul Carnell	390	25.2	
Green	Christopher Baptie	209	13.5	
Green	Maire Smith	188	12.2	
Turnout		1,812	27.5	
Registered electors		6,602		
Conservative win (new seat)				
Conservative win (new seat)				
Labour win (new seat)				

=== Chadsmoor ===
Chadsmoor
Party	Candidate	Votes	%	±%
Labour	Tony Johnson*	851	60.6	
Labour	Jacquie Prestwood*	783	55.8	
Labour	Sue Thornley*	779	55.5	
Reform UK	Alex Hunt	386	27.5	
Conservative	Phil Jones*	333	23.7	
Conservative	Gary Millward	287	20.4	
Conservative	Hayley Rushton	267	19.0	
Green	Emma Hunneyball	204	14.5	
Green	Melody Donnallie	171	12.2	
Green	Taylor Fóstra	151	10.8	
Turnout		1,594	21.8	
Registered electors		7,326		
Labour win (new seat)				
Labour win (new seat)				
Labour win (new seat)				

=== Etching Hill and The Heath ===
Etching Hill and The Heath
Party	Candidate	Votes	%	±%
Conservative	Nick Lyons*	802	47.7	
Conservative	Mike Sutherland*	798	47.5	
Conservative	Justin Johnson*	765	45.5	
Labour	Darren Foley*	708	42.1	
Labour	Nicki Haywood	650	38.7	
Labour	Dave Galaska	607	36.1	
Independent	Alan Dudson	282	16.8	
Green	Stephanie Beardmore	158	9.4	
Green	Kenneth Beardmore	145	8.6	
Green	Warren Cocker	127	7.6	
Turnout		1,851	26.6	
Registered electors		6,956		
Conservative gain from Labour				
Conservative hold				
Conservative hold				

=== Hawks Green with Rumer Hill ===
Hawks Green with Rumer Hill
Party	Candidate	Votes	%	±%
Conservative	Philippa Haden*	610	44.4	
Conservative	Adrienne Fitzgerald*	573	41.7	
Labour	Les Bullock	520	37.8	
Conservative	Paris Theodorou*	516	37.5	
Labour	Nain Aston	484	35.2	
Labour	Dale Bilbie	460	33.4	
Reform UK	Alan Dean	351	25.5	
Independent	Andrea Beach	172	12.5	
Green	Alex Jackson	168	12.2	
Independent	Chris Harborow	146	10.6	
Green	Anna Zukowska	126	9.2	
Turnout		1,520	25.4	
Registered electors		5,994		
Conservative win (new seat)				
Conservative win (new seat)				
Labour win (new seat)				

=== Heath Hayes and Wimblebury ===
Heath Hayes and Wimblebury
Party	Candidate	Votes	%	±%
Labour	Lisa Wilson*	737	50.1	
Labour	Julie Aston*	721	49.0	
Labour	Diane Todd	708	48.2	
Conservative	Samantha Thompson	562	38.2	
Conservative	Sam Priest	494	33.6	
Conservative	Nathan Kirk	431	29.3	
Reform UK	John Bernard	349	23.7	
Green	Siena Hyde-Beardmore	149	10.1	
Green	Stuart Kennedy	136	9.3	
Green	Ian Wallace	123	8.4	
Turnout		1,663	24.8	
Registered electors		6,719		
Labour win (new seat)				
Labour win (new seat)				
Labour win (new seat)				

=== Hednesford Green Heath ===
Hednesford Green Heath
Party	Candidate	Votes	%	±%
Labour	Mandy Dunnett*	675	55.9	
Labour	Fred Prestwood*	595	49.2	
Labour	Garry Samuels	569	47.1	
Conservative	Laura Harrison	418	34.6	
Conservative	David Guy	346	28.6	
Reform UK	Mark Deakin	323	26.7	
Conservative	Paul Jones*	312	25.8	
Green	Adam Green	168	13.9	
Green	Ruby Green	162	13.4	
Independent	Ron Turville	57	4.7	
Turnout		1,339	22.6	
Registered electors		5,933		
Labour hold				
Labour gain from Conservative				
Labour win (new seat)				

=== Hednesford Hills and Rawnsley ===
Hednesford Hills and Rawnsley
Party	Candidate	Votes	%	±%
Green	Andrea Muckley*	924	57.3	
Green	Jo Elson*	908	56.4	
Green	Hayley Page	831	51.6	
Conservative	Phil Hewitt	397	24.6	
Conservative	Joshua Birch	390	24.2	
Conservative	Tom Yaxley	350	21.7	
Labour	Ian Price	326	20.2	
Labour	Kath Hunt	322	20.0	
Labour	Kim Williams	296	18.4	
Independent	Linda Whitehouse	90	5.6	
Turnout		1,695	28.0	
Registered electors		6,062		
Green win (new seat)				
Green win (new seat)				
Green win (new seat)				

=== Hednesford Pye Green ===
Hednesford Pye Green
Party	Candidate	Votes	%	±%
Green	Liz Bishop*	583	42.0	
Green	Darrell Mawle*	572	41.2	
Labour	Sheila Cartwright*	564	40.6	
Labour	Pam Johnson*	548	39.5	
Green	Rachel Rock	520	37.4	
Labour	Jason Harper	518	37.3	
Conservative	Erica Bennett	287	20.7	
Conservative	Marie Taylor	252	18.1	
Conservative	Helen Young	241	17.4	
TUSC	Dave Ireland	81	5.8	
Turnout		1,479	25.3	
Registered electors		5,854		
Green win (new seat)				
Green win (new seat)				
Labour win (new seat)				

=== Norton Canes ===
Norton Canes
Party	Candidate	Votes	%	±%
Labour	Josh Newbury*	979	72.5	
Labour	John Preece*	935	69.2	
Labour	Jean Hill	799	59.2	
Conservative	Mike Hoare*	359	26.6	
Conservative	Diane Bennett	356	26.4	
Conservative	Tim Clapham	343	25.4	
Green	Stuart Crabtree	98	7.3	
Green	Linda Mawle	95	7.0	
TUSC	Paul Wainwright	88	6.5	
Turnout		1,511	22.5	
Registered electors		6,713		
Labour hold				
Labour hold				
Labour gain from Conservative				

=== Western Springs ===
Western Springs
Party	Candidate	Votes	%	±%
Conservative	Olivia Lyons*	699	52.3	
Labour	David Gaye	640	47.9	
Conservative	George Hughes	506	37.9	
Labour	Daniel Foceac	489	36.6	
Conservative	Louis Arduino*	459	34.4	
Labour	Shirley Pearson	448	33.5	
Green	Mandi Boyer*	341	25.5	
Green	Ian Pyke	257	19.2	
Green	Richard Jenking	169	12.6	
Turnout		1,472	28.1	
Registered electors		5,236		
Conservative hold				
Labour gain from Conservative				
Conservative hold				

== By-elections ==
=== Hednesford Green Heath ===
On 7 August 2025, Reform UK gained their first seat on Cannock Chase Council when they won a by-election in Hednesford Green Heath ward. The seat was previously held by Labour.

Hednesford Green Heath by-election: 7 August 2025
Party	Candidate	Votes	%	±%
Reform UK	Paul Jones	525	51.5	+31.8
Labour	Alan Pearson	230	22.6	–18.5
Conservative	Phil Hewitt	126	12.4	–13.1
Green	Rachel Rock	101	9.9	–0.3
Independent	Sharon Jagger	31	3.0	N/A
UKIP	Terry Dryhurst	5	0.5	N/A
TUSC	Gareth Knox	1	0.1	N/A
Majority		295	28.9	N/A
Turnout		1,022	16.6	–6.0
Registered electors		6,139		
Reform UK gain from Labour		Swing	▲25.2	
