= 2016 Cannock Chase District Council election =

2016 UK local government election

Map of the results of the 2016 Cannock Chase District Council election. Labour in red, Conservatives in blue and Greens in green. White areas indicate wards where no seat was up for election.

Elections to Cannock Chase District Council took place on 5 May 2016. This election was held on the same day as other local elections as well as Police and Crime Commissioner elections. A total of 13 councillors were elected from all but two of the council's wards as a third of the council was up for election.

The Labour Party held control of the council with a slightly reduced majority of one compared with their tally following the previous election. Labour lost one seat of their 2012 election total but held all of the other seats they were defending, albeit many with reduced majorities.

The Conservative Party won the highest number of seats and votes at the previous election but did not make any net gains on their 2012 result. They did, however, regain a seat in Hawks Green which was held by a former Conservative councillor who had defected to UKIP. This left the Conservatives with 13 seats on the council, confirming their status as the official opposition party. UKIP failed to match their 2014 success and did not win any seats at this election.

The Liberal Democrats only fielded two candidates, both in former areas of strength for them in Rugeley. Although one of these wards went to a recount, they did not manage to regain any of the losses they suffered in 2012. Meanwhile, the Green Party once again stood candidates in every ward and made a surprise gain in the Hednesford South ward, ousting a sitting Labour councillor and giving them their first representation on Cannock Chase District Council. Unlike previous years, there are no independent candidates.

== Results ==
Cannock Chase District Council election, 2016
Party	Seats	Gains	Losses	Net gain/loss	Seats %	Votes %	Votes	+/−
Labour	9	0	1	▼1	69.2	36.9	7,018	▼16.7
Conservative	3	0	0	0	23.1	27.5	5,219	▼3.8
Green	1	1	0	▲1	7.7	6.9	1,321	N/A
UKIP	0	0	0	0	0.0	25.4	4,821	N/A
Liberal Democrats	0	0	0	0	0.0	3.3	619	▼5.2

=== Council Composition ===
Prior to the election, the composition of the council was:

↓
22	11	5	1	1	1
Labour	Conservative	UKIP	LD	Ind	Vac

After the election, the composition of the council was:

↓
21	13	4	1	1	1
Labour	Conservative	UKIP	LD	Grn	Ind

== Ward results ==
Vote share changes are based on the results achieved by parties in 2012 when these seats were last contested.

=== Brereton and Ravenhill ===
Brereton and Ravenhill
Party	Candidate	Votes	%	±%
Labour	Alan Dudson	478	31.6	▼13.8
Liberal Democrats	Paul Fisher	475	31.4	▼9.2
UKIP	Sarah Thomas-Dean	302	20.0	N/A
Conservative	Pam Owen	223	14.7	▲0.7
Green	Michael Lees	34	2.3	N/A
Majority		3	0.2	▼4.6
Turnout		1,523	30.0	▲3.3
Labour hold		Swing	▼2.3	

=== Cannock East ===
Cannock East
Party	Candidate	Votes	%	±%
Labour	Christine Mitchell	687	44.6	▼29.6
UKIP	Dave Morris	495	32.2	N/A
Conservative	Phil Hewitt	315	20.5	▼5.3
Green	Glen Tapper	42	2.7	N/A
Majority		192	12.4	▼36.0
Turnout		1,546	30.1	▲6.0
Labour hold		Swing	▼30.9	

=== Cannock North ===
Cannock North
Party	Candidate	Votes	%	±%
Labour	Gordon Alcott	760	53.2	▼27.7
UKIP	Rob Branson	399	27.9	N/A
Conservative	Phil Jones	201	14.1	▼5.0
Green	Jodie Winter	68	4.8	N/A
Majority		361	25.3	▼36.5
Turnout		1,432	26.1	▲2.7
Labour hold		Swing	▼27.8	

=== Cannock South ===
Cannock South
Party	Candidate	Votes	%	±%
Labour	Maureen Freeman	749	46.6	▼20.0
Conservative	Johnny McMahon	423	26.3	0
UKIP	Kev Whittaker	389	24.2	N/A
Green	Leo Harrison	46	2.9	N/A
Majority		326	20.3	▼20.0
Turnout		1,615	27.7	▲4.8
Labour hold		Swing	▼10.0	

=== Cannock West ===
Cannock West
Party	Candidate	Votes	%	±%
Conservative	Doug Smith	982	51.5	▼7.1
Labour	Pat Frondigoun	510	26.8	▼14.6
UKIP	Paul Allen	310	16.3	N/A
Green	Maire Smith	102	5.4	N/A
Majority		472	24.7	▲7.5
Turnout		1,915	33.9	▲3.7
Conservative hold		Swing	▲3.8	

=== Etching Hill and the Heath ===
Etching Hill and The Heath
Party	Candidate	Votes	%	±%
Conservative	Justin Johnson	500	32.7	▼2.6
UKIP	Danny Davies	451	29.4	N/A
Labour	Jeffrey Winter	389	25.4	▼6.0
Liberal Democrats	Ray Jones	144	9.4	▼16.3
Green	David Thawley	47	3.1	N/A
Majority		49	3.3	▼0.6
Turnout		1,539	29.5	▲6.6
Conservative hold		Swing	▼16.0	

=== Hagley ===
Hagley
Party	Candidate	Votes	%	±%
Labour	Chris Martin	409	47.9	▲0.5
UKIP	Mark Deakin	234	27.4	N/A
Conservative	Robert Hughes	175	20.5	▲7.7
Green	Stuart Crabtree	36	4.2	N/A
Majority		175	20.5	▲3.3
Turnout		862	26.0	▲1.3
Labour hold		Swing	▼13.5	

=== Hawks Green ===
Hawks Green
Party	Candidate	Votes	%	±%
Conservative	Dan Snape	483	36.0	▼4.0
UKIP	Ann Bernard ^	419	31.2	N/A
Labour	Matthew Freeman	374	27.8	▼8.9
Green	Kelly Tuft	67	5.0	N/A
Majority		64	4.8	▲1.5
Turnout		1,347	24.5	▲6.4
Conservative hold		Swing	▼17.6	

^ Anne Bernard was the sitting councillor for the Hawks Green ward and previously defected from the Conservatives to UKIP.

=== Heath Hayes East and Wimblebury ===
Heath Hayes East and Wimblebury
Party	Candidate	Votes	%	±%
Labour	Diane Todd	505	40.1	▼21.3
UKIP	John Bernard	373	29.6	N/A
Conservative	Helen Borton	310	24.6	▼14.0
Green	Kenny Beardmore	71	5.7	N/A
Majority		132	10.5	▼12.3
Turnout		1,270	26.5	▲3.3
Labour hold		Swing	▼25.5	

=== Hednesford North ===
Hednesford North
Party	Candidate	Votes	%	±%
Labour	Alan Pearson	697	47.9	▼14.2
UKIP	Sue Hardman	382	26.3	N/A
Conservative	James Moffat	317	21.8	▼4.6
Green	Arlette Carmichael	59	4.0	N/A
Majority		315	21.6	▼14.2
Turnout		1,463	27.6	▲0.5
Labour hold		Swing	▼20.3	

=== Hednesford South ===
Hednesford South
Party	Candidate	Votes	%	±%
Green	Paul Woodhead	618	42.6	N/A
Conservative	Olivia Lyons	322	22.2	▼10.9
Labour	Brian Gamble	298	20.5	▼31.8
UKIP	Grahame Wiggin	213	14.7	N/A
Majority		296	20.4	N/A
Turnout		1,462	35.7	▲9.3
Green gain from Labour		Swing	▲37.2	

=== Norton Canes ===
Norton Canes
Party	Candidate	Votes	%	±%
Labour	Zaphne Stretton	659	39.4	▼16.3
Conservative	Val Jones	512	30.6	▼9.4
UKIP	Chris Cox	444	26.5	N/A
Green	Richard Jenking	59	3.5	N/A
Majority		147	8.8	▼6.9
Turnout		1,679	29.8	▲2.0
Labour hold		Swing	▼3.5	

=== Western Springs ===
Western Springs
Party	Candidate	Votes	%	±%
Labour	Carl Bennett	503	34.9	▼4.1
Conservative	Sara Allt	456	31.6	▼3.2
UKIP	Sarah Rose	410	28.5	N/A
Green	Sara Anderson	72	5.0	N/A
Majority		47	3.3	▼0.9
Turnout		1,452	28.5	▲6.9
Labour hold		Swing	▼0.5	
