= 2015 Cannock Chase District Council election =

2015 UK local government election

Map of the results of the 2015 Cannock Chase District Council election. Conservatives in blue and Labour in red.

Elections to Cannock Chase District Council took place on 7 May 2015 on the same day as other local elections in England as well as a general election. A third of the council was up for election, meaning a total of 15 councillors were elected from all of the council's wards.

The Labour Party held control of the council but with a reduced majority of two compared with the previous election. Labour gained a seat from the Liberal Democrats in Brereton and Ravenhill but suffered a net loss of three due to losses elsewhere.

The Conservative Party won the highest number of seats and votes, gaining four seats from Labour and one from the Lib Dems as well as holding the four seats they had won at the 2011 election. They also regained two seats from councillors who had defected since 2011, one who went to UKIP and one who became an independent.

UKIP came a strong third, gaining over 20% of the votes but no seats, leaving them with five seats on the council, meaning they lost their status as the main opposition party. The Liberal Democrats saw their vote share collapse and they lost the two seats they had won in 2011, leaving them with one councillor. The Green Party contested an election in the district for the first time, putting up a candidate in every ward and coming fourth in terms of vote share.

== Results ==
Cannock Chase District Council election, 2015
Party	Seats	Gains	Losses	Net gain/loss	Seats %	Votes %	Votes	+/−
Conservative	9	5	0	▲5	60.0	36.9	17,389	▼0.8
Labour	6	1	4	▼3	40.0	33.7	15,872	▼7.8
UKIP	0	0	0	0	0.0	20.8	9,780	N/A
Green	0	0	0	0	0.0	4.3	2,014	N/A
Liberal Democrats	0	0	2	▼2	0.0	3.1	1,479	▼23.7
Independent	0	0	0	0	0.0	1.2	551	N/A

=== Council Composition ===
Prior to the election, the composition of the council was:

↓
25	6	5	3	2
Labour	UKIP	Conservative	Lib Dem	Ind

After the election, the composition of the council was:

↓
22	12	5	1	1
Labour	Conservative	UKIP	LD	Ind

== Ward results ==
Vote share changes are based on the results achieved by parties in 2011 when these seats were last contested.

=== Brereton and Ravenhill ===
Brereton and Ravenhill
Party	Candidate	Votes	%	±%
Labour	Darren Foley	1,037	32.0	▼3.3
Liberal Democrats	Paul Fisher	772	23.8	▼17.6
Conservative	John Rowley	728	22.5	▼0.8
UKIP	George Neville	601	18.6	N/A
Green	Paul McCarthy	99	3.1	N/A
Majority		265	8.2	N/A
Turnout		3,262	63.4	▲29.9
Labour gain from Liberal Democrats		Swing	▲7.2	

=== Cannock East ===
Cannock East
Party	Candidate	Votes	%	±%
Labour	Tony Johnson	1,395	45.1	▼15.4
Conservative	Clive Smith	915	29.6	▼9.9
UKIP	David Morris	703	22.7	N/A
Green	Vanessa Ramkorun	83	2.7	N/A
Majority		480	15.5	▼5.5
Turnout		3,107	59.2	▲27.6
Labour hold		Swing	▼2.8	

=== Cannock North ===
Cannock North
Party	Candidate	Votes	%	±%
Labour	Jessica Cooper	1,557	48.8	▼18.0
Conservative	Philip Jones	766	24.0	▲1.3
UKIP	Amanda Capewell	758	23.7	N/A
Green	Jodie Winter	112	3.5	N/A
Majority		791	24.8	▼19.3
Turnout		3,199	57.4	▲28.2
Labour hold		Swing	▼9.7	

=== Cannock South ===
Cannock South
Party	Candidate	Votes	%	±%
Labour	John Kraujalis	1,349	40.0	▼13.3
Conservative	Daniel Snape	1,156	34.3	▲0.1
UKIP	Kevin Whittaker	725	21.5	N/A
Green	Leo Harrison	140	4.2	N/A
Majority		193	5.7	▼13.4
Turnout		3,388	57.2	▲26.2
Labour hold		Swing	▼6.7	

=== Cannock West ===
Cannock West
Party	Candidate	Votes	%	±%
Conservative	Paul Snape	2,173	54.4	▼4.5
Labour	Patrick Frondigoun	1,011	25.3	▼5.9
UKIP	Robert Branson	645	16.2	N/A
Green	Maire Smith	164	4.1	N/A
Majority		1,162	29.1	▲1.4
Turnout		4,005	70.5	▲28.4
Conservative hold		Swing	▲0.7	

=== Etching Hill and the Heath ===
Etching Hill and the Heath
Party	Candidate	Votes	%	±%
Conservative	Jim Bowater	1,311	37.7	▼11.7
Labour	Wes Davies	909	26.2	▲10.9
UKIP	Margaret Dean	672	19.3	N/A
Liberal Democrats	Raymond Jones	429	12.3	▼38.3
Green	Marc Ganley	153	4.4	N/A
Majority		402	11.5	N/A
Turnout		3,493	65.7	▲33.2
Conservative gain from Liberal Democrats		Swing	▲13.3	

=== Hagley ===
Hagley
Party	Candidate	Votes	%	±%
Labour	Michelle Dudson	790	39.3	▼5.6
Conservative	Richard Alexander	629	31.3	▲8.7
UKIP	Susan Morris	371	18.5	N/A
Liberal Democrats	Patricia Ansell	128	6.4	▼26.2
Independent	Patricia Williams	51	2.5	N/A
Green	David Thawley	40	2.0	N/A
Majority		161	8.0	▼14.3
Turnout		2,016	59.8	▲27.7
Labour hold		Swing	▼7.2	

=== Hawks Green ===
Hawks Green
Party	Candidate	Votes	%	±%
Conservative	Mike Sutherland	1,753	47.9	▼2.0
Labour	Craig Woods	849	23.2	▼9.4
UKIP	John Bernard ^	818	22.3	N/A
Green	Christian Pearce	152	4.2	N/A
Independent	Sean Gleeson	88	2.4	N/A
Majority		904	24.7	▲7.4
Turnout		3,681	65.7	▲36.7
Conservative hold		Swing	▲3.7	

^ John Bernard was the sitting councillor for the Hawks Green ward and previously defected from the Conservatives to UKIP.

=== Heath Hayes East and Wimblebury ===
Heath Hayes East and Wimblebury
Party	Candidate	Votes	%	±%
Conservative	Colin Lea	1,207	38.7	▲1.3
Labour	Alison Spicer	964	30.9	▼11.2
UKIP	Wayne Lewis	695	22.3	N/A
Independent	Les Bullock	141	4.5	N/A
Green	Kenny Beardmore	110	3.5	N/A
Majority		243	7.8	N/A
Turnout		3,138	63.3	▲31.0
Conservative gain from Labour		Swing	▲6.3	

=== Hednesford Green Heath ===
Hednesford Green Heath
Party	Candidate	Votes	%	±%
Conservative	Graham Burnett	1,026	40.5	▲6.7
Labour	Bob Todd	831	32.8	▼11.5
UKIP	Michael Sage	461	18.2	N/A
Independent	Ronald Turville	134	5.3	N/A
Green	Sharon Read	79	3.1	N/A
Majority		195	7.7	N/A
Turnout		2,550	65.5	▲32.1
Conservative gain from Labour		Swing	▲9.1	

=== Hednesford North ===
Hednesford North
Party	Candidate	Votes	%	±%
Labour	Doris Grice	1,307	40.2	▼18.3
Conservative	James Moffat	1,000	30.8	▼0.2
UKIP	Linda Whitehouse	806	24.8	N/A
Green	Glen Tapper	137	4.2	N/A
Majority		307	9.4	▼18.1
Turnout		3,278	60.9	▲30.1
Labour hold		Swing	▼9.1	

=== Hednesford South ===
Hednesford South
Party	Candidate	Votes	%	±%
Conservative	Joanne Christian	1,115	41.2	▲9.8
Labour	Gordon Ball	842	31.1	▼12.6
UKIP	Mark Deakin	580	21.4	N/A
Green	Paul Woodhead	169	6.2	N/A
Majority		273	10.1	N/A
Turnout		2,729	65.3	▲31.6
Conservative gain from Labour		Swing	▲11.2	

=== Norton Canes ===
Norton Canes
Party	Candidate	Votes	%	±%
Conservative	Mike Hoare	1,447	39.7	▼7.1
Labour	Mike Holder	1,273	34.9	▼14.8
UKIP	Christopher Cox	762	20.9	N/A
Green	Richard Jenking	95	2.6	N/A
Liberal Democrats	Ken Ansell	70	1.9	▼1.6
Majority		174	4.8	N/A
Turnout		3,671	64.8	▲31.2
Conservative gain from Labour		Swing	▲3.9	

=== Rawnsley ===
Rawnsley
Party	Candidate	Votes	%	±%
Conservative	Claire Peake	857	33.1	▼6.1
Labour	Sue Holliday	780	30.1	▼6.9
UKIP	Susan Hardman	496	19.1	N/A
Green	Arlette Carmichael	378	14.6	N/A
Liberal Democrats	Darrell Mawle	80	3.1	▼20.7
Majority		77	3.0	▲0.8
Turnout		2,595	68.2	▲28.7
Conservative hold		Swing	▲0.4	

=== Western Springs ===
Western Springs
Party	Candidate	Votes	%	±%
Conservative	Anne Allt	1,306	40.7	▲1.7
Labour	Craig Brown	978	30.5	▲3.5
UKIP	Daniel Davies	687	21.4	N/A
Independent	Neil Stanley	137	4.3	N/A
Green	Michael Lees	103	3.2	N/A
Majority		328	10.2	▼1.8
Turnout		3,223	62.3	▲30.4
Conservative hold		Swing	▼0.9	
