= 2012 Cannock Chase District Council election =

2012 UK local government election

Map of the results of the 2012 Cannock Chase District Council election. Labour in red and the Conservatives in blue. White areas indicate wards where no seat was up for election.

Elections to Cannock Chase District Council took place on 3 May 2012 on the same day as other local elections in England. A total of 14 councillors were elected from 13 wards as a third of the council was up for election. This also included a by-election in the Hagley ward which filled a vacancy that had arisen since the previous election. There were no elections held in the Hednesford Green Heath or Rawnsley wards as those wards elect only two councillors in the other two years of the election cycle.

The Labour Party gained the council from no overall control and became the first party to win an outright majority since the election of 2002. Compared with the results of the 2008 election when these seats were last up for election, Labour almost doubled their vote share and gained many seats they had previously lost to the Conservatives along with seats in Rugeley that had always previously been held by the Liberal Democrats. Three candidates from the Liberal Party stood in the Hagley ward, including one sitting councillor who defected from the Liberal Democrats, but they were not successful. The swing from Conservative to Labour across the district was 16.7%, a record for a Cannock Chase District Council election. This was the last election in which a party gained more than 50% of the vote until the Conservatives' landslide victory in 2021.

== Results ==
Cannock Chase District Council election, 2012
Party	Seats	Gains	Losses	Net gain/loss	Seats %	Votes %	Votes	+/−
Labour	11	8	0	▲8	78.6	53.6	9,202	▲23.4
Conservative	3	1	5	▼4	21.4	31.3	5,376	▼13.0
Liberal Democrats	0	0	4	▼4	0.0	8.5	1,457	▼11.9
Liberal	0	0	0	0	0.0	3.7	640	N/A
Independent	0	0	0	0	0.0	2.0	335	▲0.9
English Democrat	0	0	0	0	0.0	1.0	167	N/A

=== Council Composition ===
Prior to the election, the composition of the council was:

↓
16	13	9	2	1
Labour	Conservative	Lib Dem	Lib	Vac

After the election, the composition of the council was:

↓
24	12	5
Labour	Conservative	Lib Dem

== Ward results ==
Vote share changes are based on the results achieved by parties in 2008 when these seats were last contested.

=== Brereton and Ravenhill ===
Brereton and Ravenhill
Party	Candidate	Votes	%	±%
Labour	Alan Dudson	611	45.4	▲23.2
Liberal Democrats	Ray Easton	547	40.6	▼15.0
Conservative	Vic Hardcastle	189	14.0	▼8.2
Majority		64	4.8	N/A
Turnout		1,347	26.7	
Labour gain from Liberal Democrats		Swing	▲19.1	

=== Cannock East ===
Cannock East
Party	Candidate	Votes	%	±%
Labour	Christine Mitchell	982	74.2	▲23.8
Conservative	Susan Snape	341	25.8	▼12.7
Majority		641	48.4	
Turnout		1,323	24.1	
Labour hold		Swing	▲18.3	

=== Cannock North ===
Cannock North
Party	Candidate	Votes	%	±%
Labour	Gordon Alcott	992	80.9	▲20.9
Conservative	Phil Jones	234	19.1	N/A
Majority		758	61.8	
Turnout		1,226	23.4	
Labour hold		Swing	▲0.9	

=== Cannock South ===
Cannock South
Party	Candidate	Votes	%	±%
Labour	Maureen Freeman	882	66.6	▲22.5
Conservative	Steve Mate	349	26.3	▲18.4
Liberal Democrats	Mark Green	94	7.1	▼4.2
Majority		533	40.3	N/A
Turnout		1,393	22.9	
Labour gain from Conservative		Swing	▲20.5	

=== Cannock West ===
Cannock West
Party	Candidate	Votes	%	±%
Conservative	Chris Anslow	1,002	58.6	▼16.1
Labour	Paul Witton	709	41.4	▲16.1
Majority		293	17.2	▼32.2
Turnout		1,711	30.2	
Conservative hold		Swing	▼16.1	

=== Etching Hill and the Heath ===
Etching Hill and the Heath
Party	Candidate	Votes	%	±%
Conservative	Justin Johnson	426	35.3	▼7.5
Labour	Charlotte Stubbs	379	31.4	▲19.2
Liberal Democrats	Gary Grant	310	25.7	▼19.3
Liberal	Diane Bennett ^	93	7.7	N/A
Majority		47	3.9	N/A
Turnout		1,208	22.9	
Conservative gain from Liberal Democrats		Swing	▲13.4	

^ Diane Bennett was the sitting councillor for the Cannock West ward and previously defected from the Conservatives to the Liberal Party.

=== Hagley ===
There were two seats up for election in the Hagley ward due to the resignation of the sitting Labour councillor with the second placed candidate filling the remainder of his term.

Hagley
Party	Candidate	Votes	%	±%
Labour	Andy Lovell	387	24.7	▲10.1
Labour	Brian Bottomer	356	22.7	▲10.1
Liberal	Tony Williams ^	237	15.1	N/A
Liberal	Neil Stanley	236	15.1	N/A
Conservative	Richard Alexander	105	6.7	▼5.1
Conservative	Paul Blake	95	6.1	▼5.0
Liberal Democrats	Pat Ansell	79	5.0	▼20.2
Liberal Democrats	Les Grindey	72	4.6	▼20.1
Majority		150	9.6	
Turnout		1,567	24.7	
Labour gain from Liberal Democrats		Swing		
Labour hold		Swing		

^ The sitting councillor, Tony Williams, had previously defected from the Liberal Democrats to the Liberal Party.

Ward Summary
Party	Votes	% Votes	±%	Seats	Change
Labour	743	47.4	▲20.2	2	▲1
Liberal	473	30.2	N/A	0	
Conservative	200	12.8	▼10.1	0	
Liberal Democrats	151	9.6	▼40.3	0	▼1
Total Votes Cast	1,567				

=== Hawks Green ===
Hawks Green
Party	Candidate	Votes	%	±%
Conservative	Ann Bernard	410	40.0	▼29.3
Labour	John Preece	376	36.7	▲16.7
English Democrat	Colin Marklew	167	16.3	N/A
Liberal Democrats	Sarah Giles	71	6.9	N/A
Majority		34	3.3	▼46.0
Turnout		1,024	18.1	
Conservative hold		Swing	▼23.0	

=== Heath Hayes East and Wimblebury ===
Heath Hayes East and Wimblebury
Party	Candidate	Votes	%	±%
Labour	Diane Todd	707	61.4	▲35.8
Conservative	Alan Dean	445	38.6	▼0.9
Majority		262	22.8	N/A
Turnout		1,152	23.2	
Labour gain from Conservative		Swing	▲18.4	

=== Hednesford North ===
Hednesford North
Party	Candidate	Votes	%	±%
Labour	Alan Pearson	924	62.1	▲24.5
Conservative	Graham Burnett	392	26.4	▼14.2
Independent	Ron Turville	171	11.5	N/A
Majority		532	35.7	N/A
Turnout		1,487	27.1	
Labour gain from Conservative		Swing	▲19.4	

=== Hednesford South ===
Hednesford South
Party	Candidate	Votes	%	±%
Labour	Brian Gamble	586	52.3	▲22.5
Conservative	John Burnett	371	33.1	▼23.0
Independent	Ann Turville	164	14.6	N/A
Majority		215	19.2	N/A
Turnout		1,121	26.4	
Labour gain from Conservative		Swing	▲22.8	

=== Norton Canes ===
Norton Canes
Party	Candidate	Votes	%	±%
Labour	Zaphne Stretton	881	55.7	▲26.0
Conservative	John Beddows	633	40.0	▼8.3
Liberal Democrats	Ken Ansell	69	4.4	N/A
Majority		248	15.7	N/A
Turnout		1,583	27.8	
Labour gain from Conservative		Swing	▲17.2	

=== Western Springs ===
Western Springs
Party	Candidate	Votes	%	±%
Labour	Carl Bennett	430	39.0	▲21.0
Conservative	Jim Bowater	384	34.8	▼4.2
Liberal Democrats	Pat Williams	215	19.5	▼23.5
Liberal	Becky Williams	74	6.7	N/A
Majority		46	4.2	N/A
Turnout		1,103	21.6	
Labour gain from Liberal Democrats		Swing	▲22.3	
