= 2014 Cannock Chase District Council election =

2014 UK local government election

Map of the results of the 2014 Cannock Chase District Council election. Labour in red, UKIP in purple, Conservatives in blue, Liberal Democrats in yellow and independent in grey. White areas indicate wards where no seat was up for election.

Elections to Cannock Chase District Council took place on 22 May 2014 on the same day as other local elections in England and the European Parliament elections. A third of the council was up for election, meaning a total of 13 councillors were elected from all but two of the council's wards. There were no elections held in the Hagley or Hednesford South wards as those wards elect only two councillors in the other two years of the election cycle.

The Labour Party held control of the council and increased its majority by one compared with the previous election when it had gained the council from no overall control. Notably, UKIP came a close second and gained four seats, despite not previously contesting an election in the district; a subsequent Conservative defection shortly after the election saw them assume the status of official opposition party. Compared with the results of the 2010 election when these seats were last up for election, Labour's vote share decreased slightly but they gained one seat from the Conservatives whilst UKIP gained three seats from the Conservatives and one from the Liberal Democrats. This left the Conservatives and Lib Dems, who had previously won eight seats between them and run the council in a coalition, winning just one seat each.

== Results ==
Cannock Chase District Council election, 2014
Party	Seats	Gains	Losses	Net gain/loss	Seats %	Votes %	Votes	+/−
Labour	6	1	0	▲1	46.1	35.0	7,024	▼1.1
UKIP	4	4	0	▲4	30.8	33.3	6,691	N/A
Conservative	1	0	4	▼4	7.7	23.8	4,777	▼16.1
Liberal Democrats	1	0	2	▼2	7.7	5.6	1,120	▼17.0
Independent	1	1	0	▲1	7.7	2.3	466	N/A

=== Council Composition ===
Prior to the election, the composition of the council was:

↓
24	9	3	3	2
Labour	Conservative	Lib Dem	UKIP	Ind

After the election, the composition of the council was:

↓
25	6	6	3	1
Labour	Conservative	UKIP	Lib Dem	Ind

== Ward results ==
Vote share changes are based on the results achieved by parties in 2010 when these seats were last contested.

=== Brereton and Ravenhill ===
Brereton and Ravenhill
Party	Candidate	Votes	%	±%
Liberal Democrats	Gerald Molineux	609	39.5	▼5.0
Labour	Michelle Dudson	482	31.3	▲0.8
UKIP	Linda Whitehouse ^	451	29.2	N/A
Majority		127	8.2	
Turnout		1,542	30.3	
Liberal Democrats hold		Swing	▼2.9	

^ Linda Whitehouse was the sitting councillor for the Rawnsley ward and previously defected from the Conservatives to UKIP.

=== Cannock East ===
Cannock East
Party	Candidate	Votes	%	±%
Labour	Muriel Davies	726	46.0	▼8.6
UKIP	Dave Morris	584	37.0	N/A
Conservative	Mike Hoare	268	17.0	▼28.4
Majority		142	9.0	
Turnout		1,578	29.8	
Labour hold		Swing	▼22.8	

=== Cannock North ===
Cannock North
Party	Candidate	Votes	%	±%
Labour	Frank Allen	791	50.9	▼5.8
UKIP	Amanda Capewell	563	36.2	N/A
Conservative	Phil Jones	200	12.9	▼12.9
Majority		228	14.7	
Turnout		1,554	27.8	
Labour hold		Swing	▼21.0	

=== Cannock South ===
Cannock South
Party	Candidate	Votes	%	±%
Labour	Paul Witton	657	42.2	▲0.4
UKIP	Kevin Whittaker	551	35.4	N/A
Conservative	John Beddows	350	22.5	▼15.7
Majority		106	6.8	
Turnout		1,558	26.6	
Labour hold		Swing	▼17.9	

=== Cannock West ===
Cannock West
Party	Candidate	Votes	%	±%
Conservative	Hyra Sutton	909	45.3	▼19.1
UKIP	Richard Pursehouse	586	29.2	N/A
Labour	Craig Woods	512	25.5	▼10.1
Majority		323	16.1	
Turnout		2,007	35.2	
Conservative hold		Swing	▼24.2	

=== Etching Hill and the Heath ===
Etching Hill and the Heath
Party	Candidate	Votes	%	±%
UKIP	Stephanie Whitehouse	494	33.0	N/A
Conservative	John Rowley	473	31.6	▼6.1
Labour	Dee Barfield	333	22.2	▼1.3
Liberal Democrats	Pat Ansell	199	13.3	▼25.4
Majority		21	1.4	N/A
Turnout		1,499	28.4	
UKIP gain from Liberal Democrats		Swing	▼29.2	

=== Hawks Green ===
Hawks Green
Party	Candidate	Votes	%	±%
UKIP	Martin Buttery	634	43.0	N/A
Conservative	Mike Sutherland	465	31.6	▼15.9
Labour	Tony Johnson	374	25.4	▲0.4
Majority		169	11.4	N/A
Turnout		1,473	26.3	
UKIP gain from Conservative		Swing	▲29.5	

=== Heath Hayes East and Wimblebury ===
Heath Hayes East and Wimblebury
Party	Candidate	Votes	%	±%
UKIP	Alan Dean	621	42.1	N/A
Labour	Linda Tait	494	33.5	▼2.2
Conservative	Helen Borton	310	21.0	▼16.1
Majority		127	8.6	N/A
Turnout		1,476	29.7	
UKIP gain from Conservative		Swing	▲22.2	

=== Hednesford Green Heath ===
Hednesford Green Heath
Party	Candidate	Votes	%	±%
Labour	George Adamson	524	43.0	▲7.1
UKIP	Mick Sage	335	27.5	N/A
Conservative	Graham Burnett	283	23.2	▼12.6
Independent	Ron Turville	77	6.3	N/A
Majority		189	15.5	
Turnout		1,219	31.2	
Labour hold		Swing	▼10.2	

=== Hednesford North ===
Hednesford North
Party	Candidate	Votes	%	±%
Labour	Sheila Cartwright	653	40.5	▲1.7
UKIP	John Pugh	562	34.9	N/A
Conservative	John Burnett	397	24.6	▼7.6
Majority		91	5.6	
Turnout		1,612	30.0	
Labour hold		Swing	▼16.6	

=== Norton Canes ===
Norton Canes
Party	Candidate	Votes	%	±%
Labour	John Preece	710	41.1	▲2.0
UKIP	Martin Robinson	554	32.0	N/A
Conservative	Peter Gilbert	440	25.4	▼19.9
Liberal Democrats	Ken Ansell	25	1.4	▼14.2
Majority		156	9.1	N/A
Turnout		1,729	30.1	
Labour gain from Conservative		Swing	▲11.0	

=== Rawnsley ===
Rawnsley
Party	Candidate	Votes	%	±%
UKIP	Bill Hardman	447	35.7	N/A
Labour	Sue Holliday	419	33.5	▲2.4
Conservative	Colin Lea	336	26.9	▼14.9
Liberal Democrats	Dameon Johnson	49	3.9	▼23.2
Majority		28	2.2	N/A
Turnout		1,251	32.6	
UKIP gain from Conservative		Swing	▲11.0	

=== Western Springs ===
Western Springs
Party	Candidate	Votes	%	±%
Independent	Mick Grocott ^	389	24.6	N/A
Labour	Chris Martin	349	22.1	▼1.3
Conservative	Jim Bowater	346	21.9	▼11.8
UKIP	Shane Harrison	309	19.6	N/A
Liberal Democrats	Ray Easton	187	11.8	▼31.1
Majority		40	2.5	N/A
Turnout		1,580	28.6	
Independent gain from Liberal Democrats		Swing	▲27.9	

^ Mike Grocott was re-elected as the councillor for the Western Springs ward after he had previously left the Liberal Democrats to become an independent.
