= 2011 Cannock Chase District Council election =

2011 UK local government election

Map of the results of the 2011 Cannock Chase District Council election. Labour in red, Conservatives in blue and Liberal Democrats in yellow.

Elections to Cannock Chase District Council took place on 5 May 2011 on the same day as other local elections in England and the Alternative Vote referendum. A total of 15 councillors were elected from all of the council's wards as a third of the council was up for election.

The Labour Party was aiming to supplant the Liberal Democrats as the largest party on the council. The Conservatives were aiming to build on modest gains made in 2010, particularly from the Liberal Democrats around Rugeley. The result had the potential to have a significant impact on the dominance of the Conservative / Liberal Democrat coalition on the council.

Following the election, Labour emerged as the largest party on the council, albeit short of the 21 seats required for an overall majority. They gained two seats, one from the Conservatives and another from the Liberal Democrats. They also successfully held on to their seats won at the 2007 election and went on to form a minority administration following the election.

The Conservatives came a fairly close second in terms of vote share but won less than half the number of seats that Labour did. Despite losing a seat to Labour in Hednesford, they still managed a net gain of one seat thanks to them winning two seats from the Liberal Democrats in Rawnsley and Rugeley.

The Liberal Democrats had won five wards when these seats were last contested and were the largest party on the council with 17 seats. However, their three-seat loss, combined with councillors who had defected to them not standing for re-election, meant that the Liberal Democrats slipped to being the third largest party with 11 seats.

Also standing was one candidate from the British National Party and two candidates from The Chase Independent Party; none of these candidates were successful and so there remained only three parties represented on the council.

== Election result ==
Cannock Chase District Council election, 2011
Party	Seats	Gains	Losses	Net gain/loss	Seats %	Votes %	Votes	+/−
Labour	9	2	0	▲2	60.0	41.6	10,269	▲4.9
Conservative	4	2	1	▲1	26.7	38.4	9,475	▲3.5
Liberal Democrats	2	0	3	▼3	13.3	18.2	4,486	▼5.3
Independent	0	0	0	0	0.0	1.1	269	N/A
BNP	0	0	0	0	0.0	0.7	167	▼1.3

=== Council Composition ===
Prior to the election, the composition of the council was:

↓
17	14	10
Lib Dem	Labour	Conservative

After the election, the composition of the council was:

↓
17	13	11
Labour	Conservative	Lib Dem

== Ward results ==
Vote share changes are based on the results achieved by parties in 2007 when these seats were last contested.

=== Brereton and Ravenhill ===
Brereton and Ravenhill
Party	Candidate	Votes	%	±%
Liberal Democrats	Paul Fisher	705	41.4	▼11.2
Labour	Brian Bottomer	601	35.3	▲8.7
Conservative	Andie Wilkinson	396	23.3	▲1.5
Majority		104	6.1	▼19.9
Turnout		1,702	33.5	
Liberal Democrats hold		Swing	▼10.0	

=== Cannock East ===
Cannock East
Party	Candidate	Votes	%	±%
Labour	Janos Toth	1,059	60.5	▲2.7
Conservative	Claire Wixon	691	39.5	▲8.7
Majority		368	21.0	▼6.0
Turnout		1,750	31.6	
Labour hold		Swing	▼3.0	

=== Cannock North ===
Cannock North
Party	Candidate	Votes	%	±%
Labour	Dennis Dixon	1,057	66.8	▲2.3
Conservative	Jim Bowater	359	22.7	▲2.9
BNP	William Vaughan	167	10.5	N/A
Majority		698	44.1	▼0.6
Turnout		1,583	29.2	
Labour hold		Swing	▼0.3	

=== Cannock South ===
Cannock South
Party	Candidate	Votes	%	±%
Labour	John Kraujalis	947	53.3	▲2.9
Conservative	Amanda-Jane Holmes	608	34.2	▲0.2
Liberal Democrats	Phil Freeman	223	12.5	▲5.6
Majority		339	19.1	▲2.7
Turnout		1,778	31.0	
Labour hold		Swing	▲1.4	

=== Cannock West ===
Cannock West
Party	Candidate	Votes	%	±%
Conservative	Paul Snape	1,411	58.9	▼3.0
Labour	William Lintern	748	31.2	▲3.6
Liberal Democrats	Wayne Goodwin	235	9.8	▼0.7
Majority		663	27.7	▼6.6
Turnout		2,394	42.1	
Conservative hold		Swing	▼3.3	

=== Etching Hill and The Heath ===
Etching Hill and The Heath
Party	Candidate	Votes	%	±%
Liberal Democrats	Ray Jones	817	50.6	▲0.3
Conservative	Justin Johnson	799	49.4	▲17.2
Majority		18	1.2	▼16.9
Turnout		1,616	32.5	
Liberal Democrats hold		Swing	▼8.5	

=== Hagley ===
Hagley
Party	Candidate	Votes	%	±%
Labour	Gordon Brown	493	44.9	▲15.0
Liberal Democrats	Neil Stanley	358	32.6	▼23.5
Conservative	Philip Emery	248	22.6	▲7.7
Majority		135	12.3	N/A
Turnout		1,099	32.3	
Labour gain from Liberal Democrats		Swing	▲19.3	

=== Hawks Green ===
Hawks Green
Party	Candidate	Votes	%	±%
Conservative	John Bernard	818	49.9	▲4.3
Labour	John Preece	534	32.6	▲8.0
Liberal Democrats	Keith Bennett	288	17.6	▲5.7
Majority		284	17.3	▼3.7
Turnout		1,640	29.0	
Conservative hold		Swing	▼1.9	

=== Heath Hayes East and Wimblebury ===
Heath Hayes East and Wimblebury
Party	Candidate	Votes	%	±%
Labour	Alison Spicer	676	42.1	▲1.7
Conservative	Alan Dean	601	37.4	▼1.2
Liberal Democrats	Chris Collis	330	20.5	▼0.6
Majority		75	4.7	▲2.9
Turnout		1,607	32.3	
Labour hold		Swing	▲1.5	

=== Hednesford Green Heath ===
Hednesford Green Heath
Party	Candidate	Votes	%	±%
Labour	Bob Todd	580	44.3	▲8.0
Conservative	Lisa Pearce	443	33.8	▼8.7
Independent	Ron Turville	161	12.3	N/A
Liberal Democrats	Darrell Mawle	126	9.6	▼11.6
Majority		137	10.5	N/A
Turnout		1,310	33.4	
Labour gain from Conservative		Swing	▲8.4	

=== Hednesford North ===
Hednesford North
Party	Candidate	Votes	%	±%
Labour	Doris Grice	994	58.5	▲12.4
Conservative	Chris Anslow	526	31.0	▼5.4
Liberal Democrats	Paul Buckle	178	10.5	▼7.1
Majority		468	27.5	▲17.8
Turnout		1,698	30.8	
Labour hold		Swing	▲8.9	

=== Hednesford South ===
Hednesford South
Party	Candidate	Votes	%	±%
Labour	Gordon Ball	621	43.7	▼1.9
Conservative	Wayne Pearce	446	31.4	▲3.5
Liberal Democrats	Wendy Yates	247	17.4	▲4.0
Independent	Ann Turville	108	7.6	▼5.5
Majority		175	12.3	▼5.4
Turnout		1,422	33.7	
Labour hold		Swing	▼2.7	

=== Norton Canes ===
Norton Canes
Party	Candidate	Votes	%	±%
Labour	Michael Holder	961	49.7	▲14.3
Conservative	June Davies	905	46.8	▲12.9
Liberal Democrats	Ken Ansell	67	3.5	N/A
Majority		56	2.9	▲1.4
Turnout		1,933	33.6	
Labour hold		Swing	▲0.7	

=== Rawnsley ===
Rawnsley
Party	Candidate	Votes	%	±%
Conservative	Jodie Jones	593	39.2	▲3.3
Labour	Brian Gamble	560	37.0	▲10.2
Liberal Democrats	Pat Ansell	361	23.8	▼13.5
Majority		33	2.2	N/A
Turnout		1,514	39.5	
Conservative gain from Liberal Democrats		Swing	▲8.4	

=== Western Springs ===
Western Springs
Party	Candidate	Votes	%	±%
Conservative	Anne Allt	631	39.0	▲7.2
Liberal Democrats	Bob Meaden	551	34.0	▼10.9
Labour	David Marsden	438	27.0	▲3.7
Majority		80	5.0	N/A
Turnout		1,620	31.9	
Conservative gain from Liberal Democrats		Swing	▲9.1	
