= ChargeBox =

British charging station

A ChargeBox is a kiosk designed for charging a range of small devices including mobile phones, PDAs, iPods, PSPs, and other mobile electronics.

It was first introduced in 2005. They are usually located in public locations such as hotels, shopping centers and event spaces. Kiosks usually charge a small fee for secure charging. ChargeBox is funded by the integrated advertising space on its kiosks.

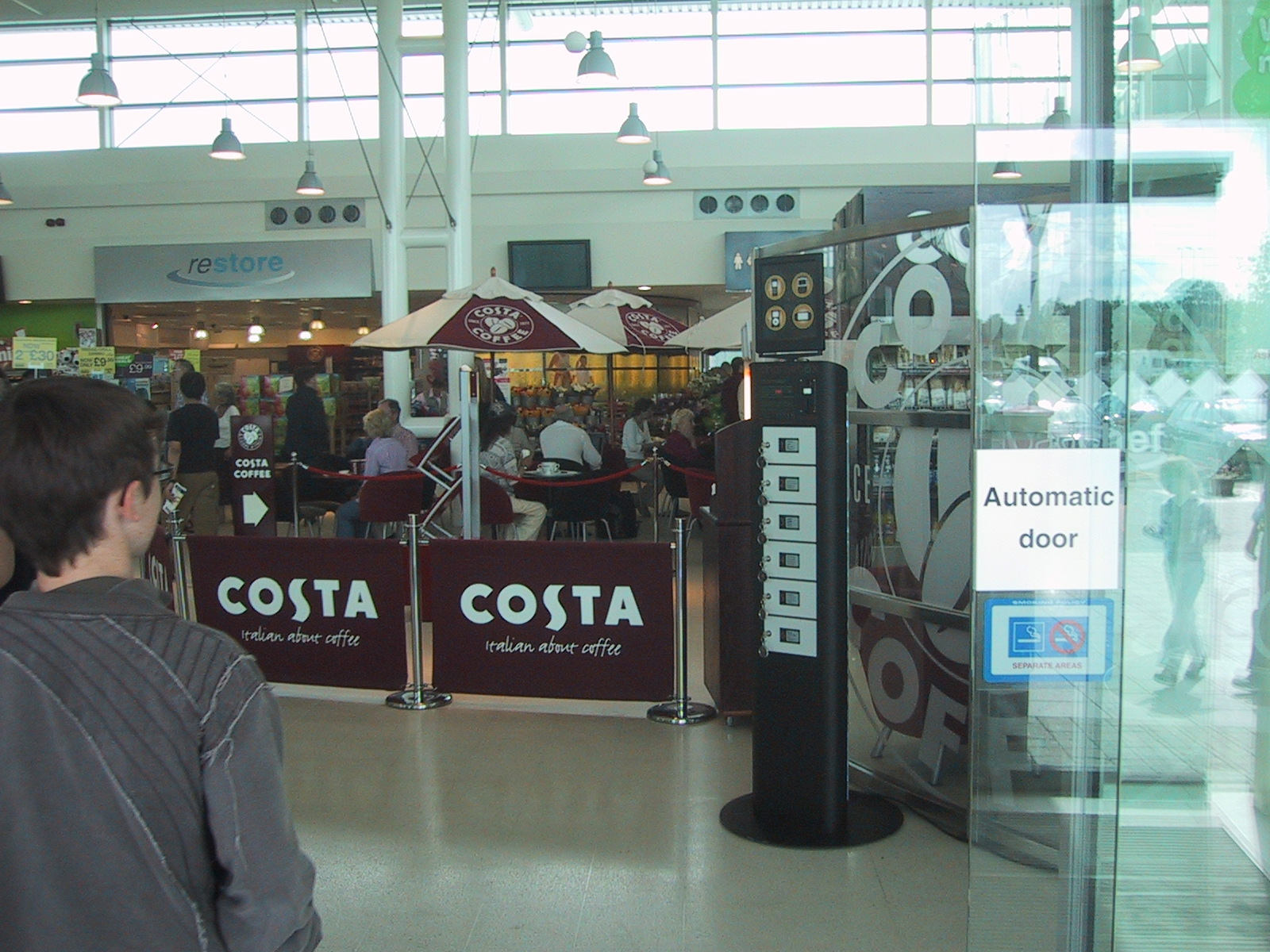
ChargeBox installed at Norton Canes services, M6 Toll

== Locations ==
The first machines were sited at locations such as EasyInternetcafes, Aurora Hotels, Holiday Inn, Novotel, Roadchef, Tower 42, Vodafone stores, the Carphone Warehouse, and various airports. About one hundred ChargeBoxes are installed in the United Kingdom in total.

In September 2006, ChargeBox began to launch the product in countries beyond the United Kingdom.
