= Chasewater Railway =

Heritage railway in Staffordshire, England

Coordinates: 52.6761°N 1.9467°W

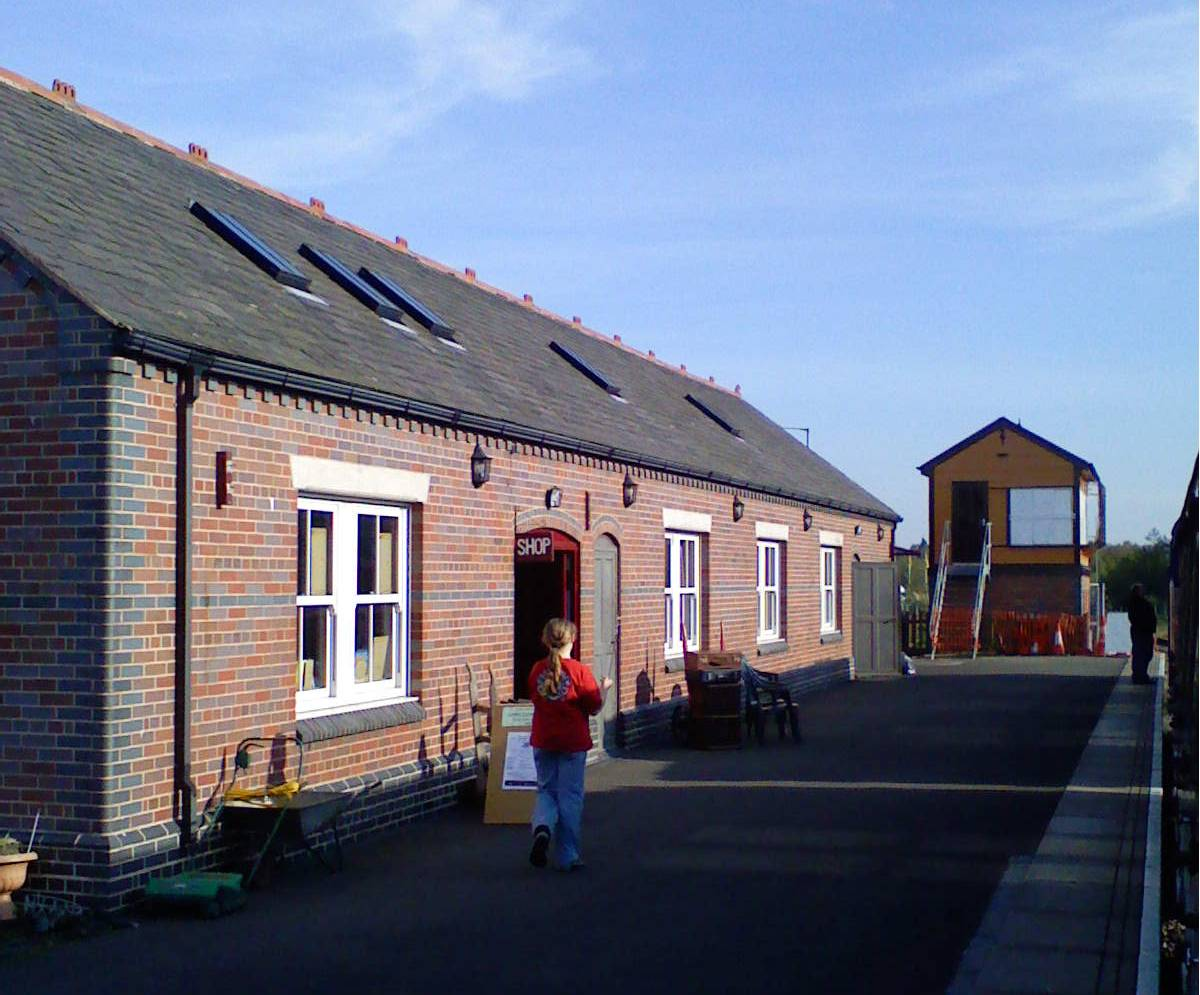
- The Chasewater Heaths station, with the new signal box rebuilt at the station in 2007
- Locale: Brownhills West
- Terminus: Chasetown (Church Street) (north); Brownhills West (south)

Commercial operations
- Original gauge: 4 ft 8 1/2 in (1,435 mm) standard gauge

Preserved operations
- Operated by: Chasewater Light Railway & Museum Company
- Stations: 4
- Length: 2 miles (3.2 km)
- Preserved gauge: 4 ft 8 1/2 in (1,435 mm) standard gauge

The Chasewater Railway is a former colliery railway running round the shores of Chasewater in Staffordshire, England. It is now operated as a heritage railway.

The line is approximately 2 miles (3.2 km) in length, contained entirely within Chasewater Country Park. The route, which forms a horseshoe shape around the lake, passes through heathland, including a Site of Special Scientific Interest, and passes over a 1/4-mile (0.40 km) long causeway.

== History ==
Prior to preservation, the line was part of the network operated by the NCB to serve the coalfields of the Cannock Chase area. The exchange sidings, where the colliery line connected with the Midland Railway, were situated about 1/4 mile (0.40 km) north of the current Brownhills West station.

Significant changes happened in 2002/2003 caused by the closure of the original Brownhills West station due to the building of the M6 Toll motorway. This led to the rebuilding of Brownhills West slightly north of the old station with significantly improved facilities, including a new carriage shed and heritage centre, and completion of the Chasetown section of the line (the 'Chasetown Extension Railway' between Chasewater Heaths and Chasetown Church Street).

In 2016 the Railway was awarded The Queen's Award for Voluntary Services.

== Stations ==
- Brownhills West
- Norton Lakeside Halt
- Chasewater Heaths (adjacent to Burntwood bypass)
- Chasetown Church Street

The buildings at Brownhills West house Chasewater Railway Museum.

== Locomotives ==
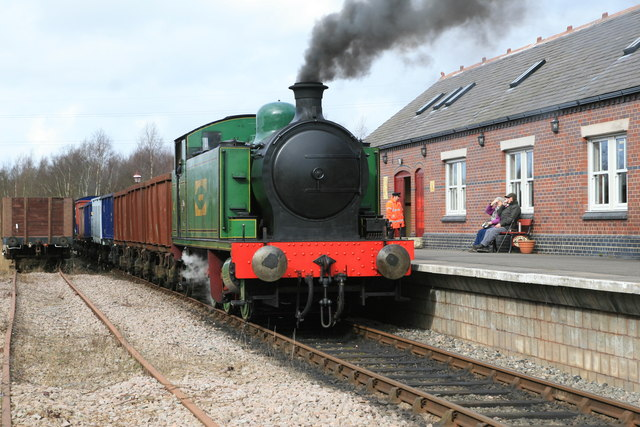
Robert Stephenson and Hawthorns 0-6-0T No. 7684 "Nechells No. 4" operating a demonstration freight train.

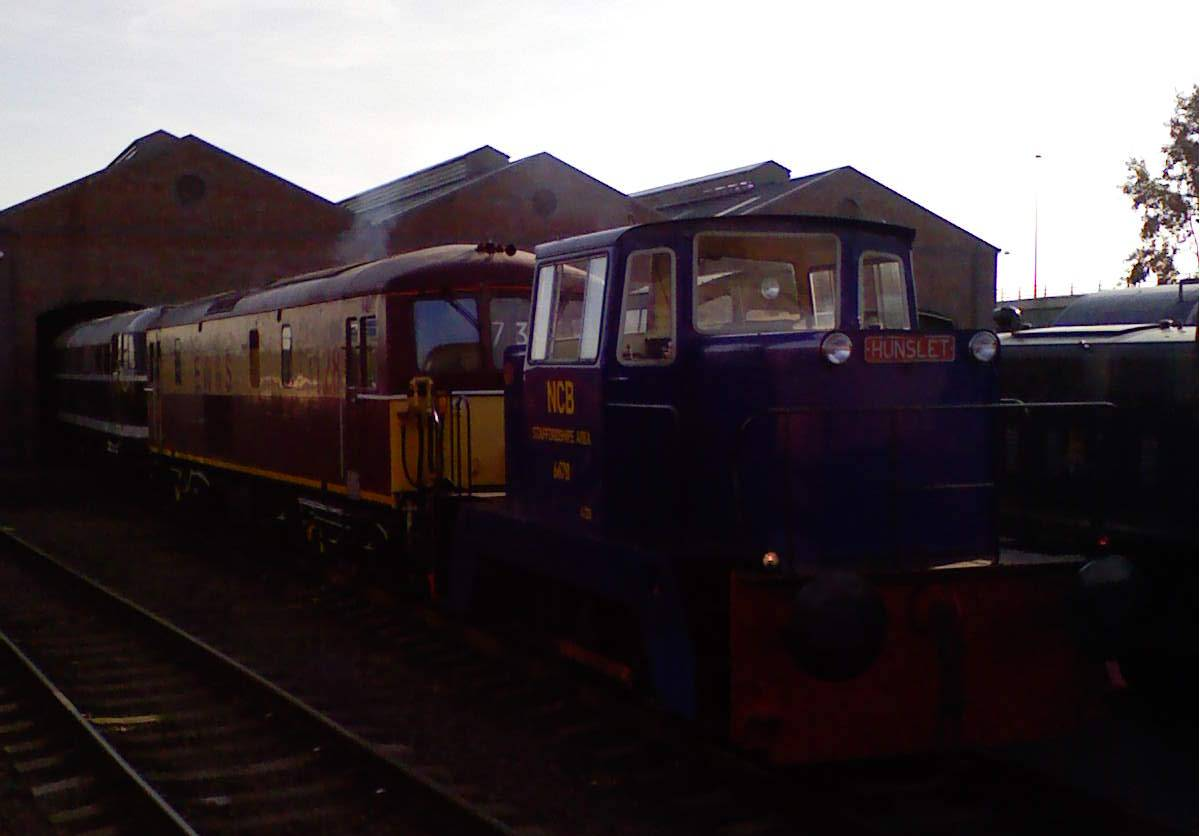
A selection of diesel locomotives participating in the 2007 Diesel Gala.

- Steam Locomotives
  - Hawthorn Leslie 0-4-0ST No. 2780 "Asbestos" built in 1909 (On display/awaiting overhaul).
  - W.G. Bagnall 0-4-0ST No. 2648 "Dunlop No. 6" built in 1940. (Operational)
  - Sentinel 0-4-0VBT No. 9632 built in 1957. (Operational)
  - Sentinel 0-4-0VBT No. 9366 built in 1945. (Operational)
  - Neilson 0-4-0ST No. 2937 "No.11" built in 1882. (Operational).
  - Peckett and Sons 0-4-0ST No. 917 built in 1902. (In storage).
  - Hudswell Clarke 0-6-0ST, No. 431 "Sheepbridge No. 15" built in 1895. (In storage)
  - Hunslet 0-6-0ST No. 3783 "Darfield No. 1/Hollybank No.3" built in 1953. (Operational, returned to service in 2021)
- Diesel Locomotives
  - BR Class 08 0-6-0DH 08472 (Operational).
  - North British 0-4-0DH No. D2911 built in 1958. (In storage/under repairs).
  - Baguley 0-4-0DM No. 3590 "Bass No. 11" built in 1962. (In storage).
  - Fowler 0-4-0DM No. 4100013 built in 1948. (In storage).
  - Hunslet 0-4-0DH No. 6678 built in 1968. (Under overhaul).
  - Andrew Barclay & Sons. 0-6-0DH No.659 'Sam' (Operational).
  - Hunslet 0-6-0DH No. 9000 built in 1983. (Operational - donated from Sellafield Ltd.).
  - Brush Bagnall 0-4-0DE No. 3097 built in 1956. (Under overhaul).
  - Kent Construction and Eng Co. 4wDM No. 1612/21 Planet built in 1929. (In storage).
  - Ruston 48 4wDM No. 305306 "Ryan" built in 1952. (Under restoration).
  - Ruston 165 6wDM No. 313394 "Jammo" (Operational, on loan from Telford Steam Railway).
  - Hudswell Clarke 0-6-0DM No. D615 built in 1938. (In storage).
  - Bagnall 0-6-0DM No. 3119 "Hem Heath" built in 1956. (In storage).
  - Bagnall 4wDH No. 3208 built in 1961. (In storage).
  - Bagnall 4wDH No. 3097 (In storage).
  - Kent Construction and Eng Co. 4wDM No. 20 Planet built in 1926. (On long term loan to the National Brewery Museum).
  - Robert Stephenson & Hawthorns 8366/Bagnall 0-4-0DH No. 530003, "Myfanwy" built in 1962. (Operational, on loan to Foxfield Railway).
  - Thomas Hill 4wDH No. 01568 "Helen" built in 1976. (Operational).
  - Simplex 0-4-0PM No. 15097 (works number 1930) "Ubique" built in 1919. (Operational/Storage).
  - Simplex 0-4-0PM No. 15099 (works number 2028) "Morris" built in 1920. (Operational/Storage).
  - GEC Traction 5383/306 (Storage)
  - GEC Traction 5414/251` (Storage)
  - GEC Traction 5454/267 (Storage)
  - FC Hibberd Co Ltd 4wDH No. 1612 (In storage)
- Diesel Multiple Units
  - BR Class 127 Centre coach no. 59603. (Operational, used as hauled coaching stock).
  - BR Class 116 Centre coach no. 59444. (Under overhaul).
  - Northern Rail Class 142 no. 142 029. (Under overhaul)
  - Northern Rail Class 142 no. 142 030. (Operational)
  - Northern Rail Class 142 no. 142 027. (Storage/spares)

== Narrow gauge railway ==
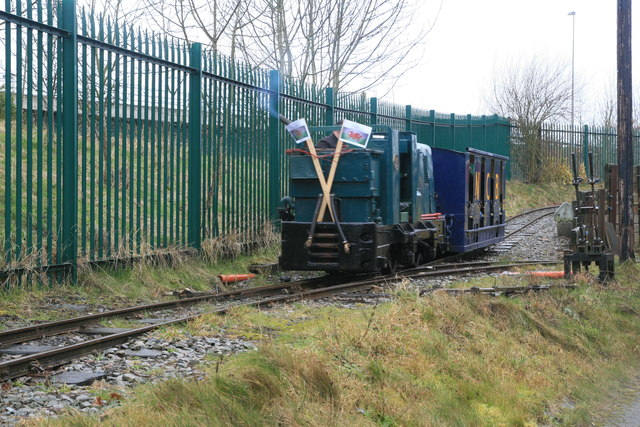
Chasewater Light Railway – narrow gauge railway

There is a 2 ft (610 mm) gauge narrow gauge railway behind the heritage centre, where there are a few shed buildings, and a line that stretches along the heritage centre close to the steam shed.
