= Chasetown (Church Street) railway station =

Heritage railway station in Staffordshire, England

Chasetown (Church Street)
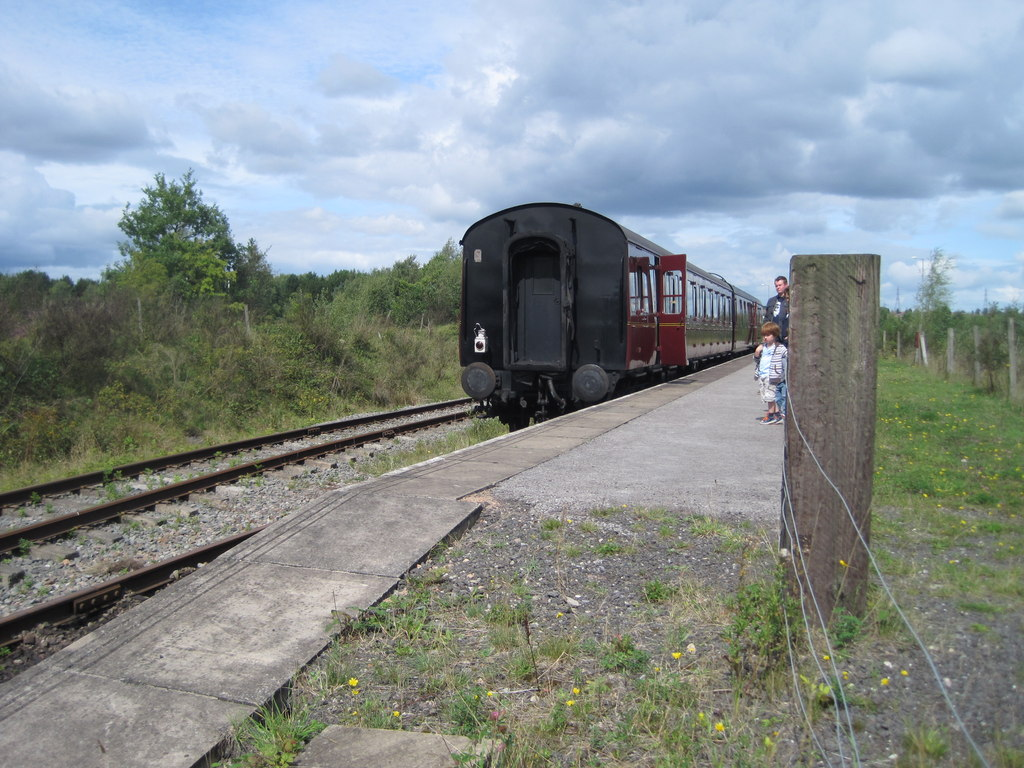
- Chasetown (Church Street) station

General information
- Location: Chasetown, Burntwood, Lichfield District, Staffordshire; England
- Coordinates: 52°40′24.00″N 1°56′35.00″W
- Grid reference: SK039083
- System: Station on heritage railway
- Manager: Chasewater Railway
- Platforms: 1
Location

Chasetown (Church Street) is a heritage railway station on the Chasewater Railway in the Chasetown suburb of Burntwood in the Lichfield District of Staffordshire, England. It is the north-eastern terminus of the line and consists of a single platform with a run-round loop. The station was constructed in 2000 as part of the extension of the line, that was undertaken following the construction of the M6 Toll Motorway. There are no station buildings.

The station is adjacent to Burntwood Rugby Club, and when the station was first built it was directly accessible from Chasetown, via the Rugby Club. Since the construction of phase 3 of the Burntwood Bypass in 2004, direct access to Chasetown is now via a footbridge. Chasewater Heaths railway station is just to the north, indeed to get to Chasetown by road one has to go past Chasewater Heaths.

Preceding station	Heritage railways	Following station
Chasewater Heaths	Chasewater Railway	Terminus
