= Burntwood =

Town in Staffordshire, England

Coordinates: 52.6831°N 1.9200°W

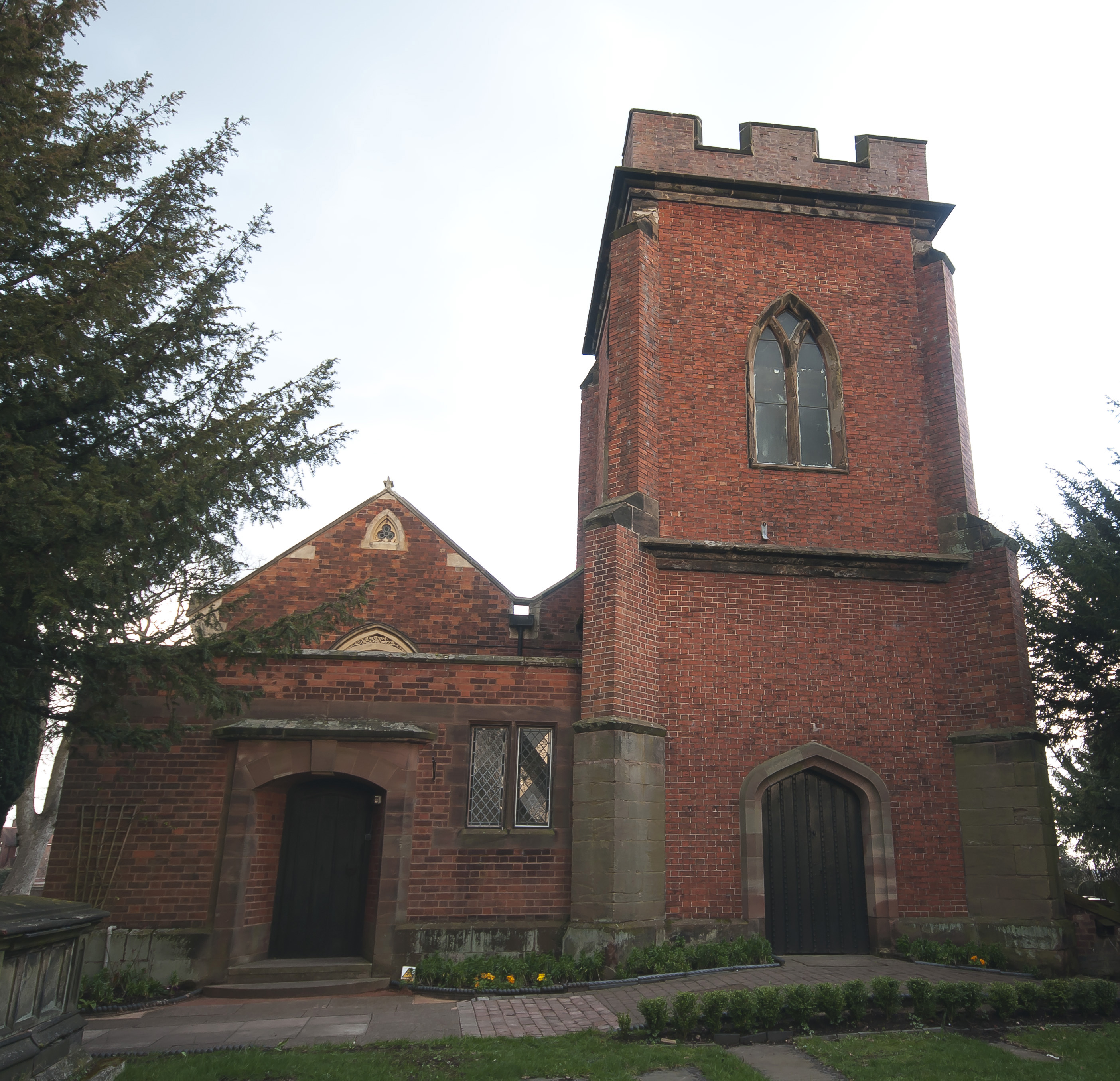
- Christchurch, Burntwood

- Location within Staffordshire
- Population: 26,049 (2020)
- OS grid reference: SK0509
- District: Lichfield
- Shire county: Staffordshire
- Region: West Midlands
- Country: England
- Sovereign state: United Kingdom
- Areas of the town: List: Boney Hay; Burntwood Green; Chase Terrace; Chasetown; Hammerwich
- Post town: BURNTWOOD
- Postcode district: WS7
- Dialling code: 01543
- Police: Staffordshire
- Fire: Staffordshire
- Ambulance: West Midlands
- UK Parliament: Lichfield
- Website: burntwood-tc.gov.uk

Burntwood is a former mining town and civil parish in the Lichfield District of Staffordshire, England. It is approximately 4 miles (6 km) west of Lichfield and north east of Brownhills, with a population of 26,049 and forming part of Lichfield district.

The town forms one of the largest urbanised parishes in England. Samuel Johnson opened an academy in nearby Edial in 1736. The town is home to the smallest park (opened to commemorate the marriage of the Prince of Wales in 1863) in the UK, Prince's Park, which is located next to Christ Church on the junction of Farewell Lane and Church Road. The town expanded in the nineteenth century around the coal mining industry.

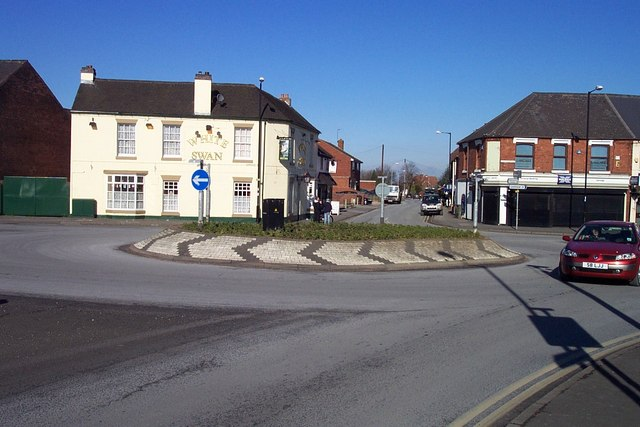
Swan Island, Burntwood

Areas of Burntwood are Boney Hay, Chase Terrace, Chasetown, Gorstey Lea, Burntwood Green, and Summerfield & All Saints. Nearby places are Brownhills, Cannock, Cannock Wood, Norton Canes, Gentleshaw, Pipehill, Muckley Corner, Hammerwich and Lichfield.

In July 2009 a Burntwood man, Terry Herbert, discovered a hoard of Saxon treasure with a metal detector in a field in the adjoining village of Hammerwich. Known as the Staffordshire Hoard, it is the largest hoard of Anglo-Saxon gold yet found.

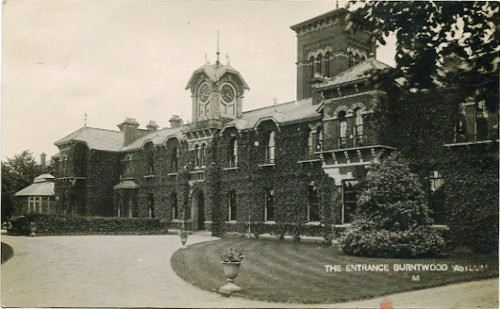
Burntwood Asylum

== Transport ==
Burntwood - along with Chasetown - has bus connections 60, 61 and 62 to Cannock and Lichfield operated by Chaserider. National Express West Midlands operate service 8 (previously 10A) to Lichfield also linking Brownhills and Walsall.

Arriva Midlands was the former operator of most bus routes around Burntwood before being taken over by D&G Bus in January 2021, now operating under Chaserider brand which is a subsidiary of D&G.

There are no railway connections in Burntwood. The nearest railway stations are Lichfield, Hednesford and Cannock, of which Lichfield is the closest.

Burntwood was served by the South Staffordshire Line which had a station in Hammerwich. There were many mineral lines in Burntwood which connected to Chasewater collieries as well as Angelsea Sidings. There is a heritage railway called the Chasewater Railway which is nearby with stops at Chasetown (Church Street) and Chasewater Heaths. In 2015, Lichfield District Council released a transport plan for Burntwood mentioning that if the line reopens to passenger services, there could be a chance of a new station to serve the town.

Ring Road near the town centre, as the name suggests, was intended to form part of the ring road around the town centre, a function superseded by the A5190.

== Media ==
Local news and television programmes are provided by BBC West Midlands and ITV Central. Television signals are received from the Sutton Coldfield TV transmitter.

Local radio stations are BBC Radio WM, Capital Mid-Counties, Heart West Midlands, Greatest Hits Radio Birmingham & The West Midlands, Smooth West Midlands, Hits Radio Birmingham and Cannock Chase Radio FM, a community radio station that broadcast from Cannock Chase.

The town is served by the local newspapers, Lichfield Mercury and Lichfield Live.

== Education ==
=== Primary schools ===
- Boney Hay Primary Academy (previously Boney Hay Community Primary School)
- Chase Terrace Primary School
- Chasetown Community School
- Fulfen Primary School
- Highfields Primary School
- Holly Grove Primary School
- Ridgeway Primary School
- Springhill Primary School
- St Joseph and St Theresa Catholic Primary School

=== Secondary schools ===
- Chase Terrace Academy (previously Chase Terrace Technology College, before that Chase Terrace High School)
- Erasmus Darwin Academy (previously Chasetown Specialist Sports College, before that Chasetown High School)

Both high schools fell victim to arson attacks in 2002. Most of Chase Terrace was destroyed in August 2002. While Chasetown Specialist Sports College lost its gym facility in December 2002. Both buildings have been rebuilt and refurbished.

=== Special education ===
- Maple Hayes Hall School

== Notable people ==
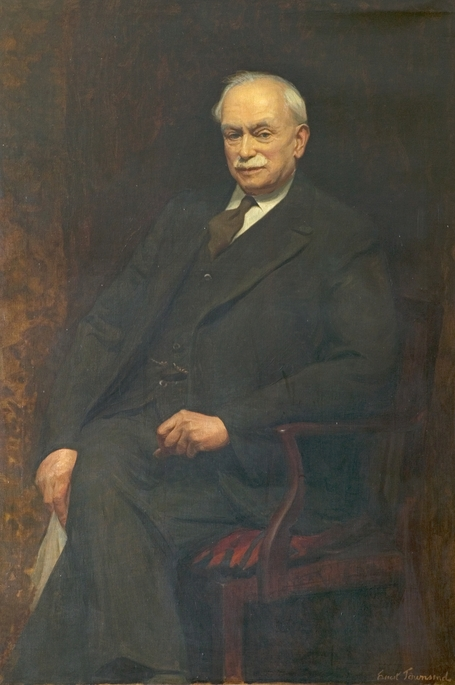
William Raynes by Ernest Townsend

- John Cornwall (c.1366–1414), soldier, politician and landowner; in 1417, when sued for £20, gave his residence as Abnalls in Burntwood
- Francis Barber, (1742-1801), Samuel Johnson's Jamaican manservant and assistant, who set up a school here.
- William Raynes (1871–1966), a British politician, MP for Derby 1923–4, alderman and Mayor of Derby 1921–22
- Alan Wiley (born 1960), a former English football referee
- Gary J. Tunnicliffe (born 1968), a British special make-up effects designer, writer and director
- Jon Brookes (1969-2013), former drummer from The Charlatans
- Jimmy Hill (born 1989), English radio, television, and Internet personality
- Stephen Sutton (1994–2014), blogger for Stephen's Story and charity activist for the Teenage Cancer Trust
- Olivia Fergusson (born 1995), footballer who plays in the Australian A-League Women for Wellington Phoenix.
- Hannah Hampton (born 2000), England women's national football team and Chelsea F.C. Women goalkeeper who attended Erasmus Darwin Academy.

== See also ==
- Listed buildings in Burntwood
