= Chasewater Heaths railway station =

Heritage railway station in Staffordshire, England

Chasewater Heaths
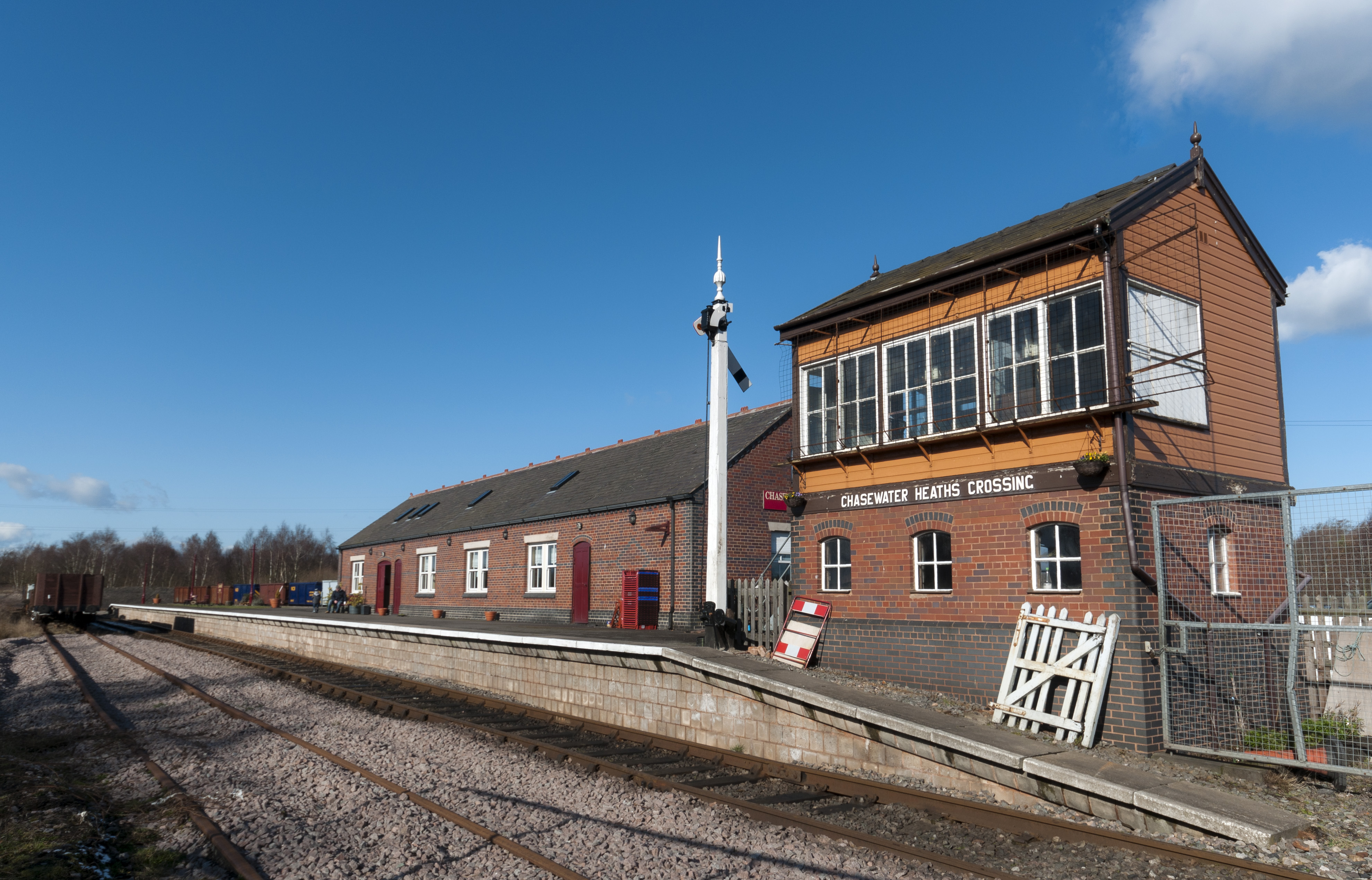

General information
- Location: Burntwood, Lichfield District; England
- Coordinates: 52°40′34.00″N 1°56′49.00″W
- Grid reference: SK036087
- System: Station on heritage railway
- Manager: Chasewater Railway
- Platforms: 1

History
- Opened: 2000; 26 years ago
Location

Chasewater Heaths is a heritage railway station on the Chasewater Railway in the town of Burntwood in the Lichfield District of Staffordshire, England. It has station building facilities, including a cafe and a recently rebuilt signal box. To the west is Norton Lakeside Halt and to the east is the terminus, Chasetown (Church Street).

The station was constructed in 2000 as part of the extension of the line, that was undertaken following the construction of the M6 Toll Motorway.

Preceding station	Heritage railways	Following station
Norton Lakeside Halt	Chasewater Railway	Chasetown (Church Street)
