= BNRR =

BNRR may refer to:

- Birmingham Northern Relief Road, see M6 Toll
- Burlington Northern Railroad
