= Brownhills West railway station =

Heritage railway station on the Chasewater Railway in Staffordshire, England

Brownhills West
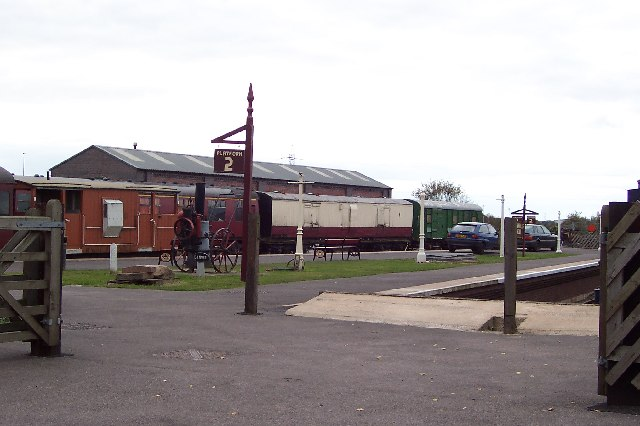
- Brownhills West railway station

General information
- Location: Chasewater, near Brownhills, Staffordshire; England
- Coordinates: 52°39′46.00″N 1°57′11.00″W
- Grid reference: SK032072
- System: Station on heritage railway
- Manager: Chasewater Railway
- Platforms: 1
Location

Brownhills West railway station is a heritage railway station on the Chasewater Railway in Staffordshire. It is the western terminus of the Chasewater Railway. The present facilities were constructed in the early 2000s after the original station, at a different location, stood in the way of the M6 Toll motorway.

Development of the railway had been inhibited by the M6 plans since 1980. The cost of the new facilities at Brownhills West were met with £500,000 from the motorway developers, £412,000 from the European Union mainly for the museum building, and a smaller amount from Lichfield District Council. The new route of the railway provided a good view of a new lake and park, another spinoff of the M6 development. The lake had previously been a disused clay pit used to dump coal-mining waste.

The station buildings house Chasewater Railway Museum.

| Preceding station | Heritage railways | Following station |
|---|---|---|
| Terminus | Chasewater Railway | Norton Lakeside Halt |
