= Boney Hay =

Suburb and ward of Burntwood in Staffordshire, England

Coordinates: 52.687725°N 1.925645°W

Boney Hay & Central
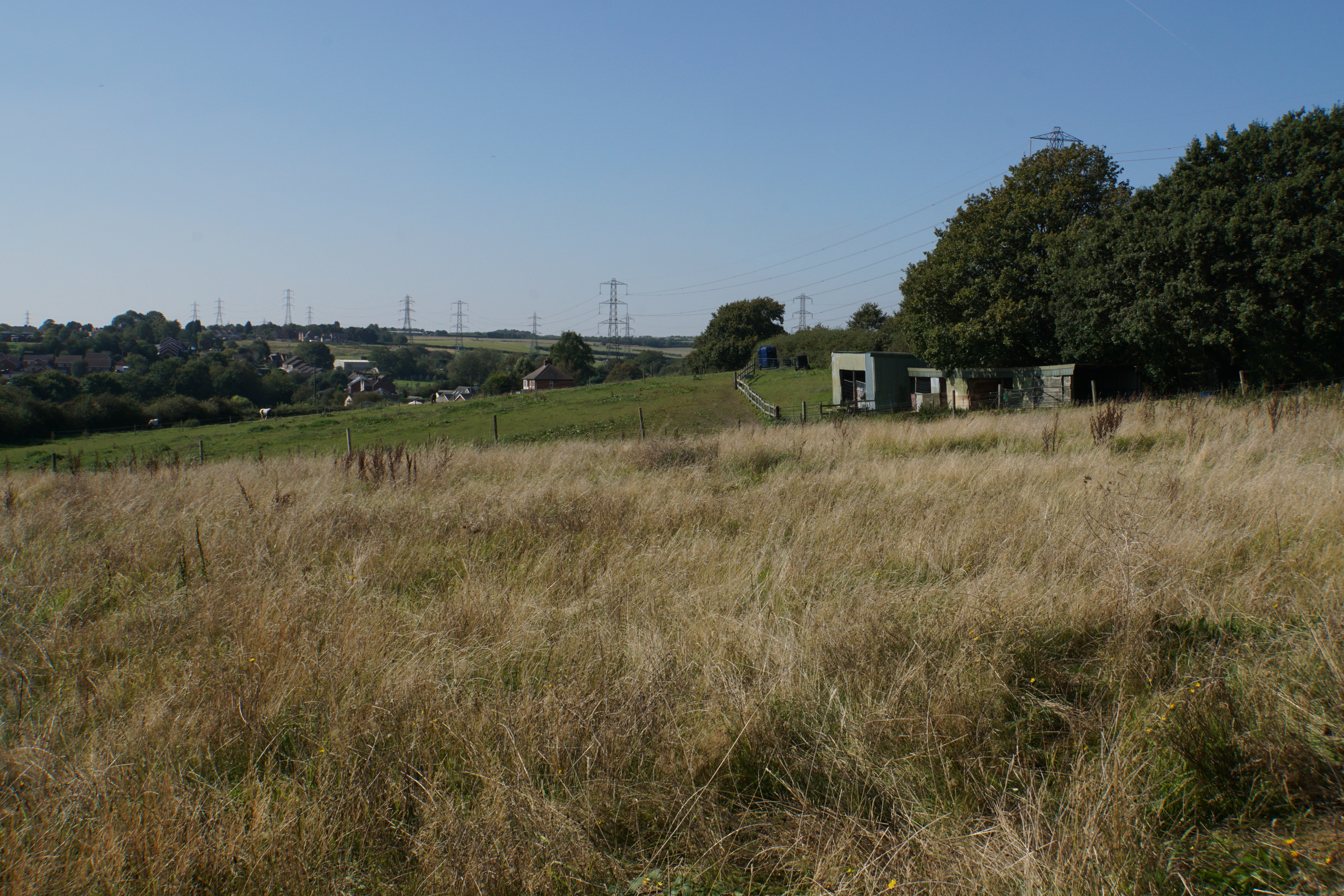
- Fields and paddocks in Boney Hay, Burntwood

- Location within Staffordshire
- Population: 6,344 (2021 Census Ward Profile)
  - London: 128 mi (206 km) SSE
- Civil parish: Burntwood
- District: Lichfield
- Shire county: Staffordshire
- Region: West Midlands
- Country: England
- Sovereign state: United Kingdom
- Post town: Burntwood
- Postcode district: WS7
- Dialling code: 01543
- Police: Staffordshire
- Fire: Staffordshire
- Ambulance: West Midlands
- UK Parliament: Lichfield

Boney Hay & Central is the name given to the ward and suburb of Burntwood in the Lichfield District in the county of Staffordshire, England. It is one of the six wards on Burntwood Town Council

== Geography ==
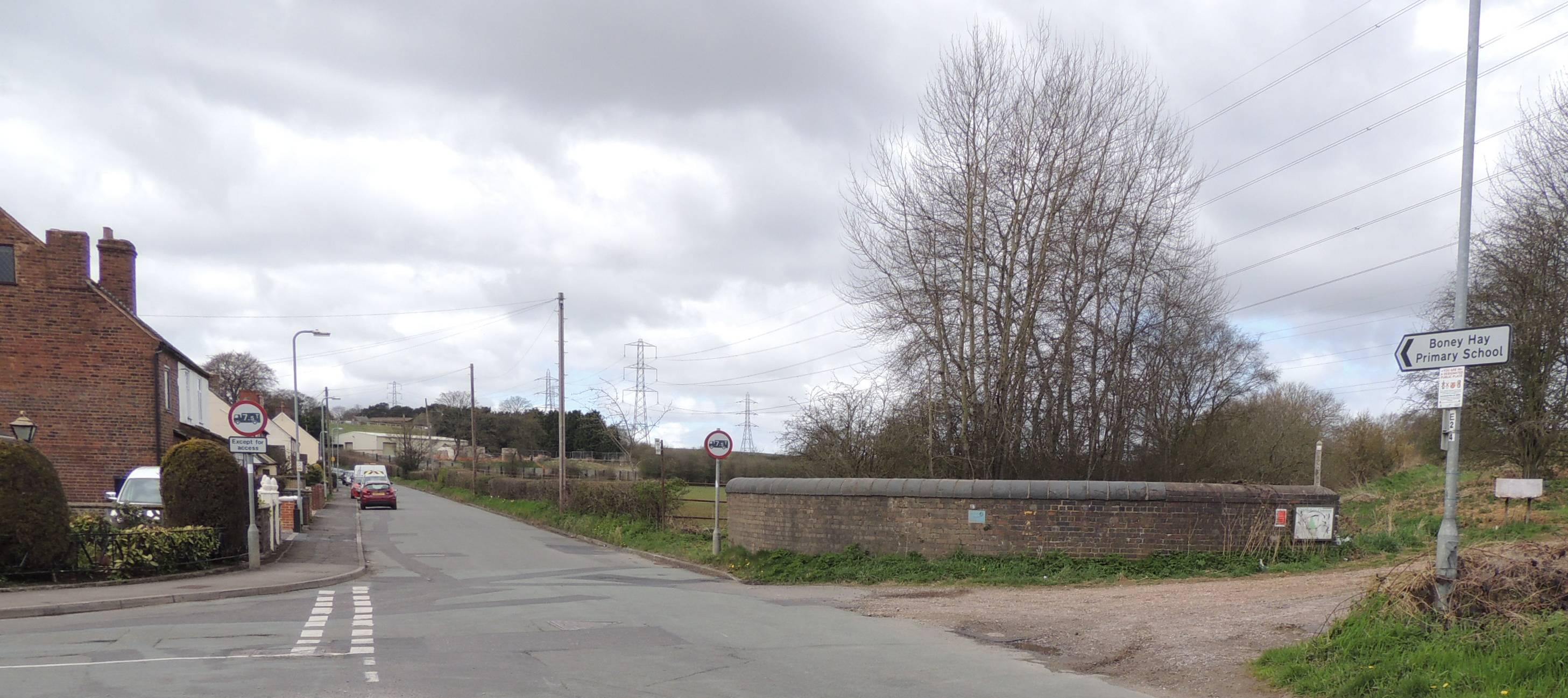
Part of Boney Hay and its residential streets

Boney Hay & Central cover the central and northern parts of Burntwood. The ward is mostly urban with residential and commercial developments. It is also close to the Staffordshire Countryside and part of Cannock Chase.

== History ==
Geographically, by common consensus it is agreed Boney Hay falls no further East than Ogley Hay Road, no further west than Rugeley Road, No further South than Rycroft Shopping Precinct/Slade Avenue/ Redwood Park, and no further north than The Chorley Road end of Gentleshaw Common. Boney Hay's name is reputed to date back to Napoleonic times when a couple of returning veterans of The Battle of Waterloo in 1812, likened the crop of wheat growing in the fields there, before current housing, as matching that at Quatre Bras, Belgium, where French Skirmishers hid to snipe at Wellington's troops. Hence the name Boney's Hay, as it was called by locals. It subsequently lost the 's' from Boney's to become Boney over time.

== Demographics ==
At the 2021 census, Boney Hay & Central's ward profile population was 6,344. Of the findings, the ethnicity and religious composition of the ward was:

: Boney Hay & Central: 2021 Census
Ethnic group	Population	%
White	6,182	97.4%
Asian or Asian British	75	1.2%
Mixed	69	1.1%
Black or Black British	12	0.2%
Other Ethnic Group	8	0.1%
Total	6,344	100%

The religious composition of Boney Hay & Central's ward at the 2021 Census was recorded as:

Boney Hay & Central: Religion: 2021 Census
Religious	Population	%
Christian	3,537	58.6%
Irreligious	2,383	39.5%
Other religion	45	0.7%
Sikh	34	0.6%
Buddhist	15	0.2%
Muslim	12	0.2%
Hindu	6	0.1%
Jewish	4	0.1%
Total	6,344	100%
