= Hammerwich railway station =

Former railway station in Hammerwich, Staffordshire, England

Hammerwich
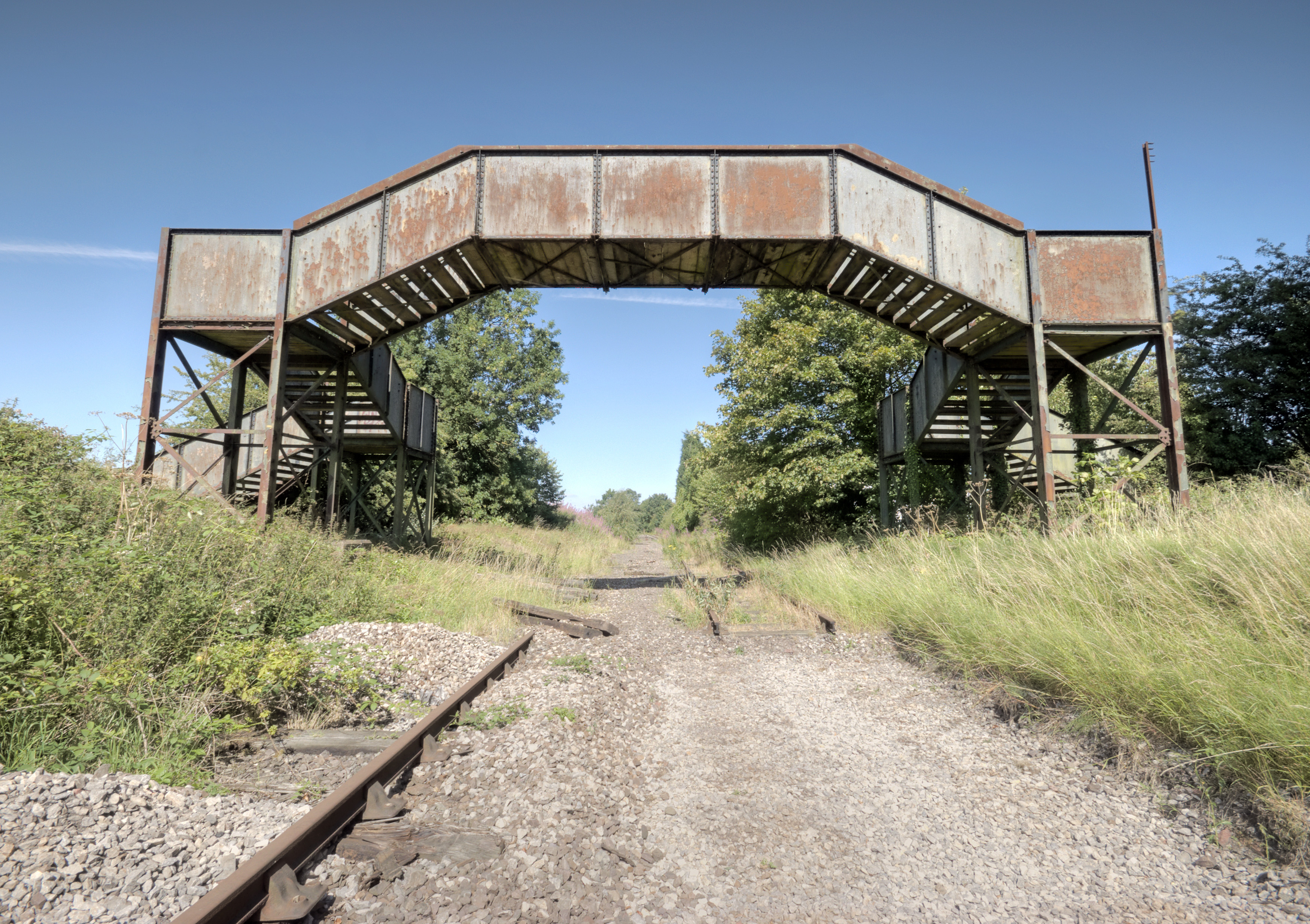
- The trackbed and footbridge at the site of the former station

General information
- Location: Hammerwich, Lichfield; England
- Coordinates: 52.6621°N 1.8920°W
- Grid reference: SK074071
- Platforms: 2

Other information
- Status: Disused

History
- Original company: South Staffordshire Railway
- Pre-grouping: London and North Western Railway
- Post-grouping: London Midland and Scottish Railway

Key dates
- 1849: Opened
- January 1965: Closed to passengers
Location

Hammerwich railway station is a disused station on the South Staffordshire Line. It opened in 1849. It closed as part of the Beeching Axe in January 1965. The station was built and served by the South Staffordshire Railway, which later became London, Midland and Scottish Railway (through amalgamation of the London and North Western Railway).

This was one of the three closed stations on this route that remained open beyond the closure of the South Staffordshire route as part of the Burton-Wolverhampton line that fell, also as part of the Beeching Axe, less than a year later. Goods traffic continued to pass here until March 1984, when the line was closed to through traffic. The section through here remained open to serve a Charringtons fuel oil terminal at Anglesey Sidings (near Brownhills) thereafter, until it also closed in 2001 - since then the line has been mothballed and officially marked 'out of use' by Network Rail. It is being preserved for the future re-opening of the railway line between Walsall and Lichfield.

The old station platforms have been demolished, but the station house still stands and is used as a private residence. The station footbridge is also accessible to the public and safe to use.

The station served the village of Hammerwich and was also the nearest station for Burntwood which is under 2 miles away. And also served the small village of Muckley Corner which was only half a mile east.

In 2019, a local group named the Burntwood Action Group made a bid to convert the disused line into a leisure greenway to connect to Chasewater and link up with the recently opened greenway at Brownhills. However, the bid was rejected by Lichfield District Council due to lack of clarity.

Preceding station	Disused railways	Following station
Lichfield City	South Staffordshire Railway; Later LNWR, then LMS, finally BR; South Staffs Line (1849-1965)	Brownhills
