= Muckley Corner =

Village in Staffordshire, England

Coordinates: 52°39′23″N 1°52′54″W

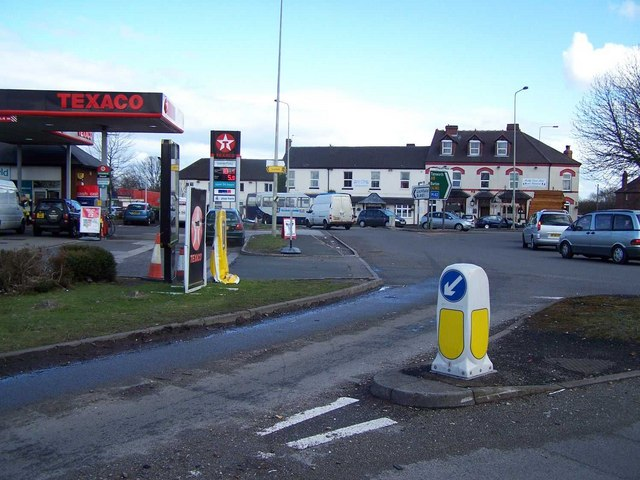

- Location within Staffordshire
- District: Lichfield
- Shire county: Staffordshire
- Region: West Midlands
- Country: England
- Sovereign state: United Kingdom
- Post town: Burntwood
- Postcode district: WS7
- Dialling code: 01543
- Police: Staffordshire
- Fire: Staffordshire
- Ambulance: West Midlands
- UK Parliament: Lichfield

Muckley Corner is a small village and area of Hammerwich in Lichfield District of Staffordshire, England. The village is located on the A5 road/Watling Street and borders the Walsall Metropolitan Borough in the West Midlands County and Lichfield District in Staffordshire.

== Amenities ==
Muckley Corner is the only area of the parish of Hammerwich with a shop that is open 24 hours. There was a police station originally in the village but it is now a private residence. It is also the headquarters of Planet Ice.

== Transport links ==
There is a regular bus service between Walsall and Lichfield via Aldridge and Rushall. The South Staffordshire line ran directly west of Muckley Corner. Hammerwich Station was only under a mile down what is now, Marebath Lane. The station was closer to Muckley Corner than Hammerwich itself. It closed in 1965 and the line closed in 1984 to Walsall but a stub from Brownhills to Lichfield via Hammerwich remained in use passing by Muckley Corner. This served an oil terminal until 2002 when the line was mothballed following the closure of the oil terminal.
