= Erasmus Darwin Academy =

Coordinates: 52.6681°N 1.9370°W

Location
- Pool Road; Burntwood, Staffordshire, WS7 3QW; England

Information
- Type: Academy
- Motto: Hard Work, High Aspirations, Limitless Opportunities
- Established: 2011
- Local authority: Staffordshire County Council
- Trust: Primitas Learning Partnership
- Department for Education URN: 136886 Tables
- Ofsted: Reports
- Principal: Phil Walklate
- Gender: Mixed
- Age: 11 to 18
- Enrolment: 1,136 (January 2023)
- Website: www.eda.staffs.sch.uk

Erasmus Darwin Academy (previously Chasetown High School, then Chasetown Specialist Sports College) is a coeducational secondary school and sixth form with academy status in the Chasetown area of Burntwood in Staffordshire, England.

== History ==
Chasetown High School opened in 1970. Its gym was attacked by arsonists in 2004 and had to be rebuilt. This work was completed in 2006, following which the school bought a field opposite Pool Road as an extension for more field activities. The road was closed and now is part of the school grounds. After the new gym was built the school gained Specialist Sports College status.

The school converted to an academy in 2011 and was renamed to commemorate Erasmus Darwin, the 18th-century physician and natural philosopher who lived nearby at Lichfield.

In 2022, the prime minister at the time Rishi Sunak visited the school.

== Facilities ==
The school has a modern sports centre with a large sports hall, dance studio and gymnasium, a high quality, full-sized Astro-Turf facility, information technology rooms, design technology workshops, a Sixth Form Centre, a theatre with tiered seating, a Library Resource Centre, and science laboratories.

There are eight hard-court tennis courts and extensive playing fields providing opportunities for many sports including rugby, cricket, football, athletics and hockey.

== Alumni ==
=== Chasetown High School ===
- Mike Garmston, former chief physiotherapist to the British Olympic athletics team in the mid-1990s, a former athlete, husband of sprinter Sonia Lannaman, and father of footballer Bradley Garmston
- Jimmy Hill, radio broadcaster
- Kim Betts, gymnast, bodybuilder, and TV presenter best known as Lightning in the ITV show Gladiators, where she was the longest-serving female star
- Matty Fryatt, Premier League footballer and coach
- Hannah Hampton, Chelsea and England football goalkeeper
- Tom Leak, footballer
- Lewis Askey - Professional Cyclist
- Harry Vicaradge - 2025 CIUK winner and powerlifter
