= Norton Canes services =

Motorway service station in Staffordshire, England

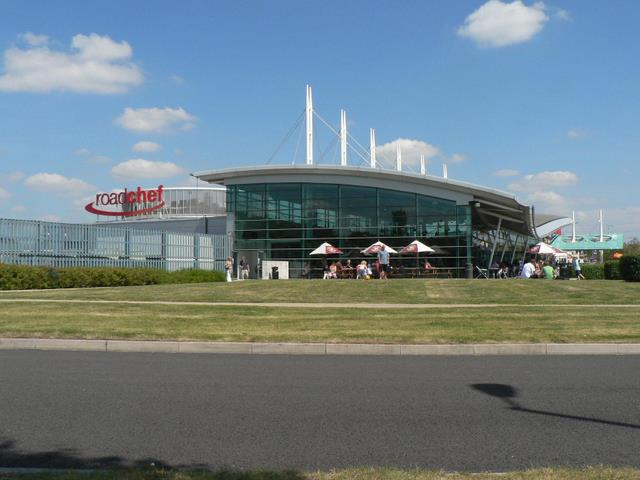
- The main buildings.

- Location in Staffordshire, England Location on the UK motorway network

Information
- County: Staffordshire
- Road: M6 Toll
- Coordinates: 52.6643°N 1.9688°W
- Operator: Roadchef
- Date opened: 9 March 2004
- Website: www.roadchef.com/locations/norton-canes

Norton Canes services is a motorway service area on the M6 Toll, in the village of Norton Canes near the towns of Brownhills, Cannock, and Walsall, in Staffordshire, England. It is operated by Roadchef, which has a 25-year lease on the site. The company also uses the site as its head office.

== History ==
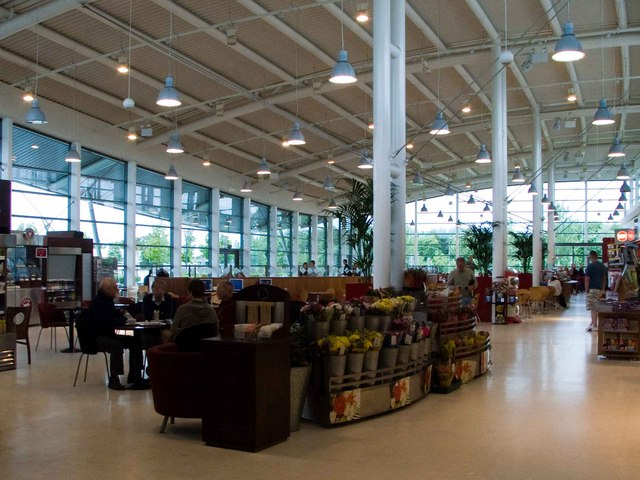
The interior in 2009

Opened on 9 March 2004, the 68-acre (28 ha) site the site was announced as featuring table service in the restaurant during the evening and free screen washes in the petrol station during quiet periods. It has been described as having "the look of a Scandinavian airport lounge". At opening, the service area produced 200 jobs for the local area.

The 2019 Motorway Services User Survey found that Norton Canes had the highest customer satisfaction of motorway services in the UK.

== Location ==
Layout of Norton Canes Service Station on the M6 Toll.

Norton Canes services is located on the M6 Toll between junctions T6 and T7, and is positioned so that it can be accessed before reaching the main toll plaza in either direction. It is a single-sided site, unlike a large majority of other service areas which have separate facilities for each direction. For this reason it is possible to do a U-turn at the services; however, it is not possible to avoid the toll in that way.

== Present day ==
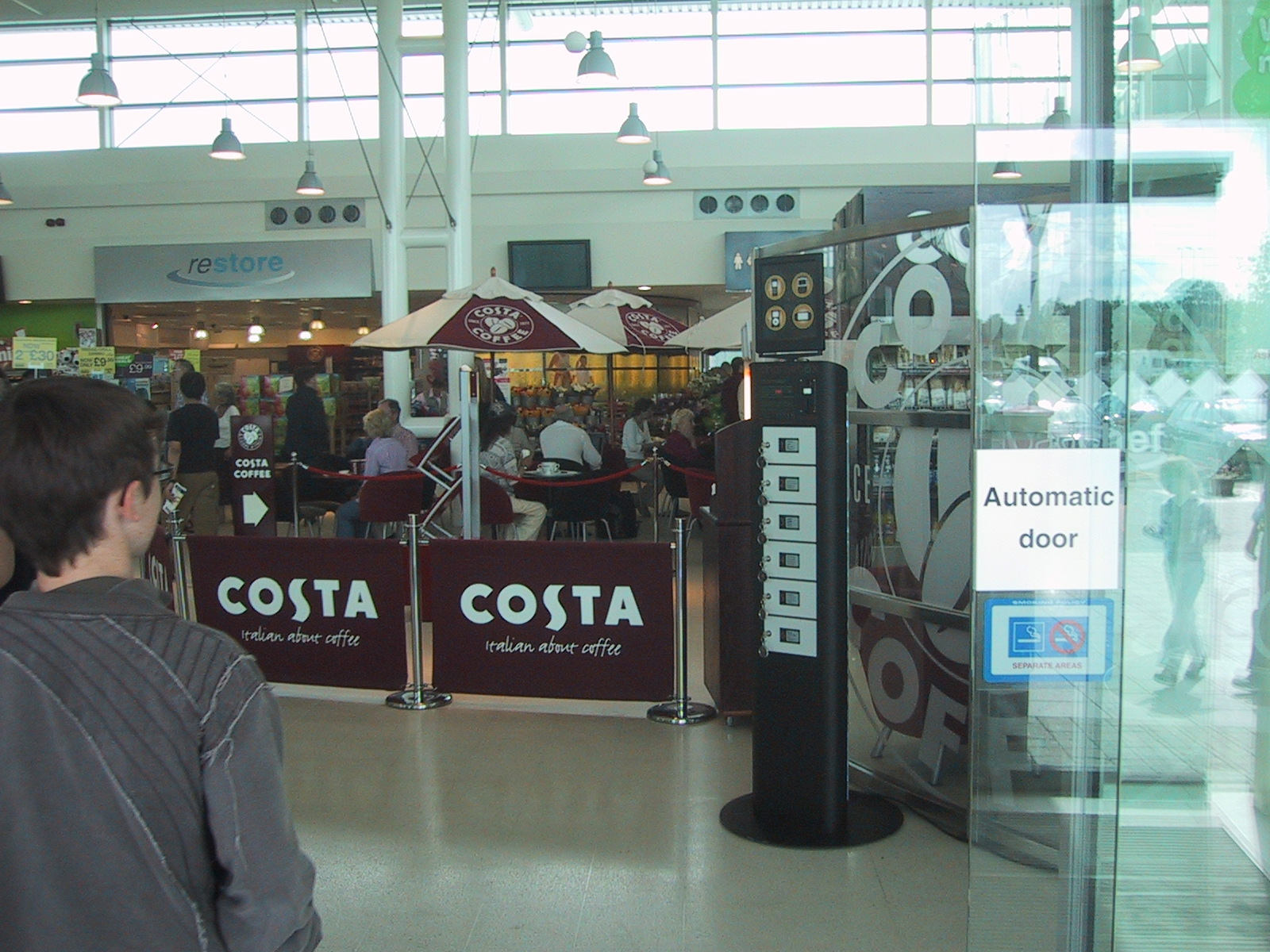
The Costa Coffee and Chargebox in the services

The petrol forecourt is operated by BP and is located to the south of the main services building. In March 2016, a McDonald's restaurant was opened at the site.
