= Jimmy Hill (broadcaster, born 1989) =

British TV presenter and YouTuber

- Born: James Hill; 9 August 1989 (age 37); Burntwood, Staffordshire, England
- Other name: jimmy0010
- Education: University of York (BA)
- Occupations: TV and radio host; YouTube personality
- Years active: 2006–present
- Employers: Capital; 4Music

James Hill (born 9 August 1989) is an English radio, television and YouTube personality who is best known for his work with 4Music and Capital. He currently hosts The Capital Evening Show with Jimmy Hill, which broadcasts across the Capital network from Sunday to Thursday from 7pm to 10pm.

== Early life ==
Hill is from Burntwood, Staffordshire. He attended Chasetown High School. He has two half-sisters and two step-brothers. He graduated with a first-class Bachelor of Arts with Honours in History from the University of York in 2009.

== Career ==
=== YouTube ===
Hill's first YouTube video, now private, was uploaded in 2006 to his main channel jimmy0010. In 2014, Hill made a joint channel Chels and Jim with Chelsea Fisher. From 2013 to 2015, Hill co-hosted The 4:01 Show with Carina Maggar, an advice-giving and pop culture web series. In 2015, Hill and fellow YouTuber Charlotte McDonnell (formerly Charlie McDonnell) began hosting Cereal Time, a YouTube-based breakfast talk show pitched and produced by Hank Green.

=== Television and radio ===
Hill made his television debut when he starred in the 2009 BBC Two documentary series Chartjackers. He also participated in the BBC Switch YouTube Takeover, The 5:19 Show, and Jimmy vs. the Penguin of Doom. Hill has done presenting work for BBC Radio 1Xtra and several companies, such as Burberry and British Airways. He hosted backstage coverage of Capital's Summertime Ball in 2014.

Hill began working with 4Music in 2015 when he hosted Stacked: Pop Up Pile. Hill hosted Trending Live!, a Monday-Thursday show about music and pop culture, with AJ Odudu and Vick Hope from 2015 to 2019. He also presented the Pop Powerlist 2016, UK Music Video Chart with Bethan Leadley, Fusion Festival, Breakers, #YouNews, and The UK Hotlist for the network.

In 2015, Hill starred in the Disney XD UK miniseries Mega Awesome Super Hacks alongside Oli White and Mawaan Rizwan.

Hill started his radio career with a gig on Radio X in late 2016 and early 2017. He covered Sunday mornings from 11am to 1pm before moving to Saturday and Sunday's 6 to 8am slot.

In 2017, Hill landed a show on Capital. Initially, he presented Sunday mornings from 9am to 12pm before moving to Sundays from 7pm to 10pm after a few months. He also presented events such as the Summertime Ball for the network. In 2019, The Capital Evening Show with Jimmy Hill, a weeknight show from 7pm to 10pm, was launched across the network. Hill also took over Saturday afternoons 4pm to 7pm at this time. At the start of 2021, Hill returned to Sunday evenings as his show got extended to Thursday. He left Saturday afternoons at this time and was replaced by Niall Gray.

=== Podcast ===
In 2018, Hill and Fisher hosted a true crime and supernatural podcast titled The Ghost Museum (formerly The Slab).

== Personal life ==
Hill lives in North London. He is gay and came out publicly via a video on his YouTube channel in 2015. He has since opened up about several topics regarding sexuality.
