= Listed buildings in Hammerwich =

Hammerwich is a civil parish in the district of Lichfield, Staffordshire, England. The parish contains eight listed buildings that are recorded in the National Heritage List for England. All the listed buildings are designated at Grade II, the lowest of the three grades, which is applied to "buildings of national importance and special interest". The parish contains the village of Hammerwich and smaller settlements, and the surrounding area. The listed buildings include houses and farmhouses, a windmill converted into a house, a church, and a milepost.

== Buildings ==
Name and location	Photograph	Date	Notes
Pipe Hill Farmhouse; 52.66884°N 1.86591°W	—	Medieval	The farmhouse was altered and refaced in the 18th century. It has a timber framed core with cruck construction, rebuilding and extensions in red brick, partly roughcast, and tiled roofs. The farmhouse consists of one bay of a former hall range with one storey and an attic, to the right is a gabled cross-wing with two storeys and an attic, and further to the right is an extension with one bay and two-storeys and an attic. On the front is a gabled porch, the windows are casements, and in the hall range is a garbed dormer. Inside, there is a timber-framed partition and a cruck truss.
Edial House, Lichfield Road; 52.67479°N 1.88948°W	—	Mid 18th century	A red brick farmhouse with a hipped tile roof, two storeys, and a symmetrical front of three bays. The central doorway has a fanlight and a hood. and the windows are sashes with painted wedge lintels.
Overton Manor, Overton Lane; 52.66731°N 1.90663°W	—	Late 18th century	A red brick house with a floor band and a tile roof. There are two storeys and three bays. There is a central doorway, and the windows are casements with keystones.
The Windmill, Mill Lane; 52.66413°N 1.90177°W		Late 18th century	The former windmill, converted into a house, is in rendered brick, and has a circular plan. The building tapers and has three storeys, windows to the north, and ogee roof capping.
Hammerwich House Farm, Hall Lane; 52.66429°N 1.89994°W	—	Early 19th century	A red brick farmhouse with a hipped tile roof, two storeys and an attic, and two bays. In the centre is a stone porch with a segmental roof, and the windows are sashes with segmental heads.
Hammerwich Place Farmhouse, Hall Lane; 52.66063°N 1.89117°W	—	Early 19th century	The farmhouse is in painted brick and has a tile roof with verge parapets. There are two storeys and three bays. The central doorway has a moulded surround, a radial fanlight and a cornice, and the windows are sashes with segmental heads.
St John the Baptist's Church; 52.66399°N 1.89794°W		1873–83	The church is in sandstone with tile roofs, and is in Early English style. It consists of a nave, a north aisle, a chancel with a polygonal apse, and a west steeple. The steeple has a tower with three stages, clasping buttresses, a west door and windows, both with pointed heads, an octagonal stair turret at the southeast, and a broach spire with lucarnes.
Milepost at SK 086072; 52.66291°N 1.87406°W		Early 20th century (possible)	The milepost is on the northwest side of the A461 road. It is in cast iron and has a triangular plan and a sloping head. On the head is "HAMMERWICH PARISH"" and on the faces are the distances to Lichfield and Walsall.
