= Smartphone charging kiosk =

Smartphone charging kiosks are USB-powered kiosks. They are used for charging smartphones, power banks, and other electronic appliances. They are often found at airports and on cruise ships, but may also be found in other public areas. Some cities use them as a way to collect additional fees.
