= Chasetown =

Village in Staffordshire, England

Coordinates: 52.67°N 1.92°W

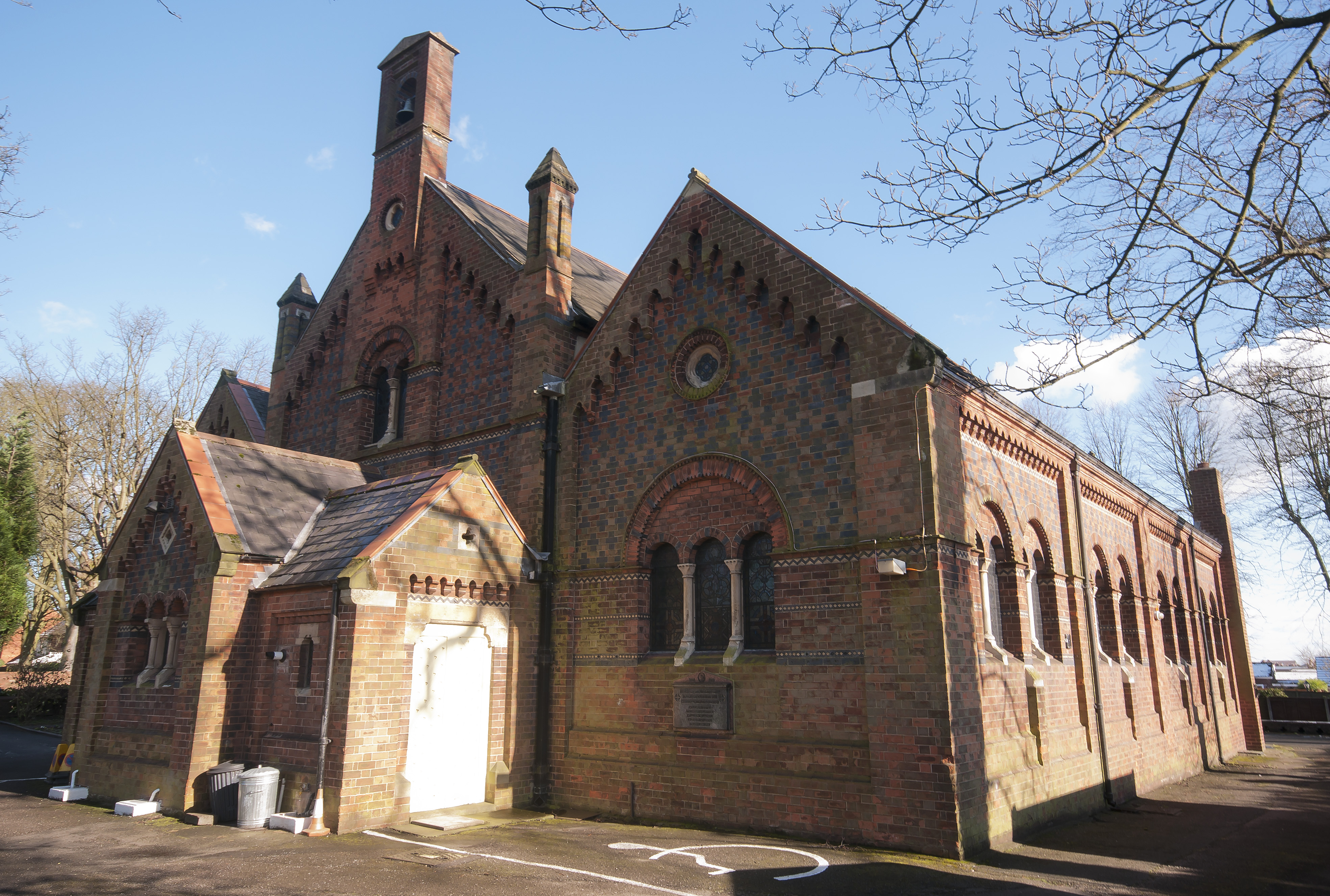
- St Anne's Church

- Location within Staffordshire
- Population: 3,885 (2011.Ward)
- OS grid reference: SK055085
  - London: 127 miles (204 km)
- District: Lichfield
- Shire county: Staffordshire
- Region: West Midlands
- Country: England
- Sovereign state: United Kingdom
- Post town: BURNTWOOD
- Postcode district: WS7
- Dialling code: 01543
- Police: Staffordshire
- Fire: Staffordshire
- Ambulance: West Midlands
- UK Parliament: Lichfield

Chasetown is a village in the town of Burntwood in Staffordshire, England. It is split between the civil parishes of Burntwood and Hammerwich.

== History ==
Chasetown developed in the mid 19th century as a coal mining village. At first the village was simply known as Cannock Chase due to its proximity to the nearby forest, it was known as Chasetown by 1867. The first pit was sunk by the Marquess of Anglesey in 1849, when the Hammerwich Colliery opened at the base of Chasewater reservoir. Cannock Chase Collieries No.2 and No.9 opened in the 1850s to the west of the village where the Rugby club is sited today.

As a result of the mining industry, housing for the miners began to be developed around High Street, Church Street and Queen Street. Three pairs of cottages were built on the north side of Church Street in 1854, and the adjoining Uxbridge Arms existed by 1856. By 1860 two shopkeepers, three beer retailers, The Miners'Rest and The Junction a builder, a drill owner, a shoemaker, and a market gardener were listed at the village of Cannock Chase. St Anne's Church was built by 1865 and by 1883 the village had spread as far north as Hill Street.

After World War II the village began to grow eastwards when the Oakdene estate began to be built. The estate was still expanding by 1958 when it became the largest council estate in Lichfield district. The last mine closed in 1959 but the village continued expanding as it became an overspill area for people from the Black Country. The rural green spaces between Burntwood and Chasetown were developed by the early 1970s which effectively joined the two villages.

There is today little evidence of the mining industry left in the area other than Chasewater reservoir which provided water for the canals that were used to transport coal to Birmingham and the Black Country, and Chasewater Light Railway which has been restored for leisure use. St Anne's Church was said to be the first church in England to have electric lighting, with power supplied by the collliery in 1883. The church, built in 1865, is grade II* listed.

== Sport ==
Chasetown Football Club, Burntwood Rugby Club, Chasewater Watersports Centre and Erasmus Darwin Academy are also based here.
