= List of electoral wards in Staffordshire =

This is a list of electoral divisions and wards in the ceremonial county of Staffordshire in the West Midlands. All changes since the re-organisation of local government following the passing of the Local Government Act 1972 are shown. The number of councillors elected for each electoral division or ward is shown in brackets.

== County council ==
=== Staffordshire ===
Electoral Divisions from 1 April 1974 (first election 12 April 1973) to 7 May 1981:

1. Audley (1)
2. Biddulph No. 1 (1)
3. Biddulph No. 2 (1)
4. Burton on Trent No. 1 (1)
5. Burton on Trent No. 2 (1)
6. Burton on Trent No. 3 (1)
7. Burton on Trent No. 4 (1)
8. Cannock No. 1 (1)
9. Cannock No. 2 (2)
10. Cannock No. 3 (1)
11. Cannock No. 4 (1)
12. Cannock Rural No. 1 (Penkridge) (1)
13. Cannock Rural No. 2 (Brewood) (1)
14. Cannock Rural No. 3 (Essington) (1)
15. Cannock Rural No. 4 (Wyrley) (1)
16. Cheadle No. 1 (1)
17. Cheadle No. 2 (1)
18. Cheadle No. 3 (1)
19. Codsall (1)
20. Eccleshall (1)
21. Kidsgrove (1)
22. Kinver (1)
23. Leek (North) (1)
24. Leek (South) (1)
25. Leek Rural (1)
26. Lichfield City (Northern) (1)
27. Lichfield City (Southern) (1)
28. Lichfield Rural No. 1 (Armitage) (1)
29. Lichfield Rural No. 2 (Shenstone) (1)
30. Lichfield Rural No. 3 (Burntwood And (1)
31. Lichfield Rural No. 4 (Chase Terrac (1)
32. Lichfield Rural No. 5 (Lichfield Ru (1)
33. Madeley (1)
34. Newcastle under Lyme No. 1 (1)
35. Newcastle under Lyme No. 2 (2)
36. Newcastle under Lyme No. 3 (1)
37. Newcastle under Lyme No. 4 (1)
38. Newcastle under Lyme No. 5 (1)
39. Newcastle under Lyme No. 6 (1)
40. Rugeley No. 1 (1)
41. Rugeley No. 2 (1)
42. Stafford (East Gate) (1)
43. Stafford (North Gate) (1)
44. Stafford (South Gate) (1)
45. Stafford (West Gate) (1)
46. Stafford Rural No. 1 (Gnosall) (1)
47. Stafford Rural No. 2 (Trent Valley) (1)
48. Stoke on Trent No. 1 (1)
49. Stoke on Trent No. 2 (1)
50. Stoke on Trent No. 3 (1)
51. Stoke on Trent No. 4 (1)
52. Stoke on Trent No. 5 (1)
53. Stoke on Trent No. 6 (1)
54. Stoke on Trent No. 7 (1)
55. Stoke on Trent No. 8 (1)
56. Stoke on Trent No. 9 (1)
57. Stoke on Trent No. 10 (1)
58. Stoke on Trent No. 11 (1)
59. Stoke on Trent No. 12 (1)
60. Stoke on Trent No. 13 (1)
61. Stoke on Trent No. 14 (1)
62. Stoke on Trent No. 15 (1)
63. Stoke on Trent No. 16 (1)
64. Stoke on Trent No. 17 (1)
65. Stoke on Trent No. 18 (1)
66. Stoke on Trent No. 19 (1)
67. Stoke on Trent No. 20 (1)
68. Stoke on Trent No. 21 (1)
69. Stoke on Trent No. 22 (1)
70. Stoke on Trent No. 23 (1)
71. Stoke on Trent No. 24 (1)
72. Stone Rural (1)
73. Stone Urban (1)
74. Talke (1)
75. Tamworth No. 1 (2)
76. Tamworth No. 2 (1)
77. Tutbury Rural (North) (1)
78. Tutbury Rural (South) (1)
79. Uttoxeter Rural (1)
80. Uttoxeter Urban (1)
81. Wombourne (1)
82. Wrottesley (1)

Electoral Divisions from 7 May 1981 to 5 May 2005:

1. Abbey (1); electoral division abolished in 1998
2. Audley & Chesterton (1)
3. Berryhill (1); electoral division abolished in 1998
4. Biddulph Town (1)
5. Biddulph-Endon (1)
6. Blurton (1); electoral division abolished in 1998
7. Bolebridge (1)
8. Bradwell & Porthill (1)
9. Brewood (1)
10. Brookhouse (1); electoral division abolished in 1998
11. Burntwood Chase (1)
12. Burntwood Saints (1)
13. Burslem Central (1); electoral division abolished in 1998
14. Burslem Grange (1); electoral division abolished in 1998
15. Burton Tower (1)
16. Burton Town (1)
17. Burton Trent (1)
18. Burton West (1)
19. Cannock (1)
20. Castle Liberty (1)
21. Caverswall (1)
22. Chadsmoor (1)
23. Cheadle-Checkley (1)
24. Chell (1); electoral division abolished in 1998
25. Churnet Valley (1)
26. Codsall (1)
27. Cross Heath (1)
28. Dove (1)
29. East Valley (1); electoral division abolished in 1998
30. Eccleshall (1)
31. Essington (1)
32. Fenton Green (1); electoral division abolished in 1998
33. Gnosall (1)
34. Great Fenton (1); electoral division abolished in 1998
35. Great Wyrley (1)
36. Hanley Green (1); electoral division abolished in 1998
37. Hartshill (1); electoral division abolished in 1998
38. Hednesford (1)
39. Keele & Silverdale (1)
40. Kidsgrove (1)
41. Kinver (1)
42. Leek North (1)
43. Leek Rural (1)
44. Leek South (1)
45. Lichfield City North (1)
46. Lichfield City South (1)
47. Lichfield Rural East (1)
48. Lichfield Rural North (1)
49. Lichfield Rural South (1)
50. Longton South (1); electoral division abolished in 1998
51. Meir Park (1); electoral division abolished in 1998
52. Needwood Forest (1)
53. Newcastle Rural (1)
54. Norton & Bradeley (1); electoral division abolished in 1998
55. Norton Canes (1)
56. Penkridge (1)
57. Perrycrofts (1)
58. Rugeley North (1)
59. Rugeley South (1)
60. Shelton (1); electoral division abolished in 1998
61. Stafford East Gate (1)
62. Stafford North Gate (1)
63. Stafford South Gate (1)
64. Stafford Trent Valley (1)
65. Stafford West Gate (1)
66. Stoke West (1); electoral division abolished in 1998
67. Stone Rural (1)
68. Stone Urban (1)
69. Talke (1)
70. The Hayes (1)
71. The Heaths (1)
72. Thistleberry (1)
73. Trentham Park (1); electoral division abolished in 1998
74. Tunstall North (1); electoral division abolished in 1998
75. Uttoxeter Rural (1)
76. Uttoxeter Urban (1)
77. Watling (1)
78. Westlands (1)
79. Weston (1); electoral division abolished in 1998
80. Wolstanton (1)
81. Wombourne (1)
82. Wrottesley (1)

Electoral Divisions from 5 May 2005 to 2 May 2013:

1. Amington (1)
2. Audley & Chesterton (1)
3. Biddulph North (1)
4. Biddulph South & Endon (1)
5. Bolebridge (1)
6. Bradwell & Porthill (1)
7. Brereton & Ravenhill (1)
8. Brewood (1)
9. Burntwood North (1)
10. Burntwood South (1)
11. Burton Tower (1)
12. Burton Town (1)
13. Burton Trent (1)
14. Cannock Town Centre (1)
15. Cannock Villages (1)
16. Caverswall (1)
17. Chadsmoor (1)
18. Cheadle & Checkley (1)
19. Cheslyn Hay, Essington & Great Wyrley (2)
20. Churnet Valley (1)
21. Codsall (1)
22. Cross Heath & Silverdale (1)
23. Dove (1)
24. Eccleshall (1)
25. Etching Hill & Heath (1)
26. Gnosall & Doxey (1)
27. Hednesford & Rawnsley (2)
28. Horninglow & Stretton (1)
29. Keele & Westlands (1)
30. Kidsgrove & Talke (2)
31. Kinver (1)
32. Leek Rural (1)
33. Leek South (1)
34. Lichfield City North (1)
35. Lichfield City South (1)
36. Lichfield Rural East (1)
37. Lichfield Rural North (1)
38. Lichfield Rural South (1)
39. Lichfield Rural West (1)
40. Needwood Forest (1)
41. Newcastle Rural (1)
42. Newcastle South (1)
43. Penkridge (1)
44. Perrycrofts (1)
45. Perton (1)
46. Stafford Central (1)
47. Stafford North (1)
48. Stafford South East (1)
49. Stafford Trent Valley (1)
50. Stafford West (1)
51. Stone Rural (1)
52. Stone Urban (1)
53. Stonydelph (1)
54. Uttoxeter Rural (1)
55. Uttoxeter Town (1)
56. Watling North (1)
57. Watling South (1)
58. Wolstanton (1)
59. Wombourne (1)

Electoral Divisions from 2 May 2013 to 1 May 2025:

1. Amington (1)
2. Audley & Chesterton (1)
3. Biddulph North (1)
4. Biddulph South & Endon (1)
5. Bolebridge (1)
6. Bradwell, Porthill & Wolstanton (1)
7. Brereton & Ravenhill (1)
8. Brewood (1)
9. Burntwood North (1)
10. Burntwood South (1)
11. Burton Tower (1)
12. Burton Town (1)
13. Burton Trent (1)
14. Cannock Town Centre (1)
15. Cannock Villages (1)
16. Caverswall (1)
17. Chadsmoor (1)
18. Cheadle & Checkley (1)
19. Cheslyn Hay, Essington & Great Wyrley (2)
20. Churnet Valley (1)
21. Codsall (1)
22. Dove (1)
23. Eccleshall (1)
24. Etching Hill & Heath (1)
25. Gnosall & Doxey (1)
26. Hednesford & Rawnsley (2)
27. Horninglow & Stretton (1)
28. Keele, Knutton & Silverdale (1)
29. Kidsgrove (1)
30. Kinver (1)
31. Leek Rural (1)
32. Leek South (1)
33. Lichfield City North (1)
34. Lichfield City South (1)
35. Lichfield Rural East (1)
36. Lichfield Rural North (1)
37. Lichfield Rural South (1)
38. Lichfield Rural West (1)
39. May Bank & Cross Heath (1)
40. Needwood Forest (1)
41. Newcastle Rural (1)
42. Newcastle South (1)
43. Penkridge (1)
44. Perrycrofts (1)
45. Perton (1)
46. Stafford Central (1)
47. Stafford North (1)
48. Stafford South East (1)
49. Stafford Trent Valley (1)
50. Stafford West (1)
51. Stone Rural (1)
52. Stone Urban (1)
53. Stonydelph (1)
54. Talke & Red Street (1)
55. Uttoxeter Rural (1)
56. Uttoxeter Town (1)
57. Watling North (1)
58. Watling South (1)
59. Westlands & Thistleberry (1)
60. Wombourne (1)

Electoral Divisions from 1 May 2025 to present:

1. Audley & Chesterton (1)
2. Biddulph North (1)
3. Biddulph South & Endon (1)
4. Bradwell & Porthill (1)
5. Brereton & Ravenhill (1)
6. Brewood (1)
7. Burntwood North (1)
8. Burntwood South (1)
9. Burton South (1)
10. Burton Tower (1)
11. Burton Town (1)
12. Burton Trent (1)
13. Cannock Town (1)
14. Caverswall (1)
15. Chadsmoor (1)
16. Cheadle & Checkley (1)
17. Cheslyn Hay Village, Featherstone & Shareshill (1)
18. Churnet Valley (1)
19. Codsall (1)
20. Dove (1)
21. Eccleshall & Gnosall (1)
22. Etching Hill & The Heath (1)
23. Great Wyrley & Essington (1)
24. Hawks Green, Rawnsley & Cannock Wood (1)
25. Hednesford North (1)
26. Kidsgrove (1)
27. Kinver (1)
28. Leek Rural (1)
29. Leek South (1)
30. Lichfield City North (1)
31. Lichfield City South (1)
32. Lichfield Rural East (1)
33. Lichfield Rural North (1)
34. Lichfield Rural South (1)
35. Lichfield Rural West (1)
36. May Bank & Wolstanton (1)
37. Needwood Forest (1)
38. Newcastle Rural (1)
39. Newcastle South (1)
40. Norton Canes, Heath Hayes & Wimblebury (1)
41. Penkridge (1)
42. Perrycrofts (1)
43. Perton (1)
44. Silverdale & Knutton (1)
45. Stafford Central (1)
46. Stafford North (1)
47. Stafford South East (1)
48. Stafford South West (1)
49. Stafford Trent Valley (1)
50. Stafford West & Rural (1)
51. Stone Rural North (1)
52. Stone Urban (1)
53. Stretton (1)
54. Talke & Red Street (1)
55. The Cotes/Two Rivers (1)
56. The Heaths (1)
57. Uttoxeter Rural (1)
58. Uttoxeter Town (1)
59. Watling (1)
60. Westlands, Thistleberry & Keele (1)
61. Wilnecote (1)
62. Wombourne (1)

== Unitary authority council ==
=== Stoke-on-Trent ===
Wards from 1 April 1974 (first election 7 June 1973) to 3 May 1979:

Wards from 3 May 1979 to 2 May 2002:

Wards from 2 May 2002 to 5 May 2011:

1. Abbey Green (3)
2. Bentilee & Townsend (3)
3. Berryhill & Hanley East (3)
4. Blurton (3)
5. Burslem North (3)
6. Burslem South (3)
7. Chell & Packmoor (3)
8. East Valley (3)
9. Fenton (3)
10. Hanley West & Shelton (3)
11. Hartshill & Penkhull (3)
12. Longton North (3)
13. Longton South (3)
14. Meir Park & Sandon (3)
15. Northwood & Birches Head (3)
16. Norton & Bradeley (3)
17. Stoke & Trent Vale (3)
18. Trentham & Hanford (3)
19. Tunstall (3)
20. Weston & Meir North (3)

Wards from 5 May 2011 to 4 May 2023:

1. Abbey Hulton & Townsend (2)
2. Baddeley, Milton & Norton (3)
3. Bentilee & Ubberley (2)
4. Birches Head & Central Forest Park (2)
5. Blurton East (1)
6. Blurton West & Newstead (1)
7. Boothen & Oak Hill (1)
8. Bradeley & Chell Heath (1)
9. Broadway & Longton East (1)
10. Burslem Central (1)
11. Burslem Park (1)
12. Dresden & Florence (1)
13. Eaton Park (1)
14. Etruria & Hanley (1)
15. Fenton East (1)
16. Fenton West & Mount Pleasant (1)
17. Ford Green & Smallthorne (1)
18. Goldenhill & Sandyford (1)
19. Great Chell & Packmoor (2)
20. Hanford & Trentham (2)
21. Hanley Park & Shelton (1)
22. Hartshill & Basford (1)
23. Hollybush & Longton West (1)
24. Joiner’s Square (1)
25. Lightwood North & Normacot (1)
26. Little Chell & Stanfield (1)
27. Meir Hay (1)
28. Meir North (1)
29. Meir Park (1)
30. Meir South (1)
31. Moorcroft (1)
32. Penkhull & Stoke (1)
33. Sandford Hill (1)
34. Sneyd Green (1)
35. Springfields & Trent Vale (1)
36. Tunstall (1)
37. Weston Coyney (1)

Wards from 4 May 2023 to present:

1. Abbey Hulton (1)
2. Baddeley, Milton & Norton (3)
3. Basford & Hartshill (1)
4. Bentilee, Ubberley & Townsend (2)
5. Birches Head & Northwood (2)
6. Blurton (1)
7. Boothen (1)
8. Bradeley & Chell Heath (1)
9. Bucknall & Eaton Park (1)
10. Burslem (1)
11. Burslem Park (1)
12. Dresden & Florence (1)
13. Etruria & Hanley (1)
14. Fenton East (1)
15. Fenton West & Mount Pleasant (1)
16. Ford Green & Smallthorne (1)
17. Goldenhill & Sandyford (1)
18. Great Chell & Packmoor (2)
19. Hanford, Newstead & Trentham (3)
20. Hanley Park, Joiner’s Square & Shelton (2)
21. Hartshill Park & Stoke (1)
22. Hollybush (1)
23. Lightwood North & Normacot (1)
24. Little Chell & Stanfield (1)
25. Longton & Meir Hay South (1)
26. Meir Hay North, Parkhall & Weston Coyney (2)
27. Meir North (1)
28. Meir Park (1)
29. Meir South (1)
30. Moorcroft & Sneyd Green (2)
31. Penkhull & Springfields (1)
32. Sandford Hill (1)
33. Trent Vale & Oak Hill (1)
34. Tunstall (1)

== District councils ==
=== Cannock Chase ===
Wards from 1 April 1974 (first election 7 June 1973) to 6 May 1976:

Wards from 6 May 1976 to 2 May 2002:

Wards from 2 May 2002 to 2 May 2024:

1. Brereton & Ravenhill (3)
2. Cannock East (3)
3. Cannock North (3)
4. Cannock South (3)
5. Cannock West (3)
6. Etching Hill & The Heath (3)
7. Hagley (2)
8. Hawks Green (3)
9. Heath Hayes East & Wimblebury (3)
10. Hednesford Green Heath (2)
11. Hednesford North (3)
12. Hednesford South (2)
13. Norton Canes (3)
14. Rawnsley (2)
15. Western Springs (3)

Wards from 2 May 2024 to present:

1. Brereton & Ravenhill (3)
2. Chadsmoor (3)
3. Cannock Longford & Bridgtown (3)
4. Cannock Park & Old Fallow (3)
5. Etching Hill & the Heath (3)
6. Hawks Green with Rumer Hill (3)
7. Heath Hayes & Wimblebury (3)
8. Hednesford Green Heath (3)
9. Hednesford Hills & Rawnsley (3)
10. Hednesford Pye Green (3)
11. Norton Canes (3)
12. Western Springs (3)

=== East Staffordshire ===
Wards from 1 April 1974 (first election 7 June 1973) to 3 May 1979:

Wards from 3 May 1979 to 1 May 2003:

Wards from 1 May 2003 to 4 May 2023:

1. Abbey (1)
2. Anglesey (2)
3. Bagots (1)
4. Branston (3)
5. Brizlincote (2)
6. Burton (1)
7. Churnet (1)
8. Crown (1)
9. Eton Park (2)
10. Heath (2)
11. Horninglow (3)
12. Needwood (2)
13. Rolleston on Dove (1)
14. Shobnall (2)
15. Stapenhill (3)
16. Stretton (3)
17. Town (2)
18. Tutbury & Outwoods (2)
19. Weaver (1)
20. Winshill (3)
21. Yoxall (1)

Wards from 4 May 2023:

1. Anglesey (2)
2. Bagots & Needwood (3)
3. Blythe (1)
4. Branston (3)
5. Brizlincote (2)
6. Burton & Eton (3)
7. Crown (1)
8. Dove (3)
9. Heath (3)
10. Horninglow & Outwoods (3)
11. Shobnall (2)
12. Stapenhill (2)
13. Stramshall & Weaver (2)
14. Stretton (3)
15. Town (2)
16. Winshill (2)

=== Lichfield ===
Wards from 1 April 1974 (first election 7 June 1973) to 3 May 1979:

Wards from 3 May 1979 to 1 May 2003:

Wards from 1 May 2003 to 7 May 2015:

1. All Saints (2)
2. Alrewas & Fradley (3)
3. Armitage with Handsacre (3)
4. Boley Park (3)
5. Boney Hay (2)
6. Bourne Vale (1)
7. Burntwood Central (2)
8. Chadsmead (2)
9. Chase Terrace (3)
10. Chasetown (2)
11. Colton & Mavesyn Ridware (1)
12. Curborough (3)
13. Fazeley (3)
14. Hammerwich (2)
15. Highfield (2)
16. King’s Bromley (1)
17. Leomansley (3)
18. Little Aston (2)
19. Longdon (1)
20. Mease & Tame (2)
21. St John's (3)
22. Shenstone (2)
23. Stonnall (1)
24. Stowe (3)
25. Summerfield (2)
26. Whittington (2)

Wards from 7 May 2015 to present:

1. Alrewas & Fradley (3)
2. Armitage with Handsacre (3)
3. Boley Park (2)
4. Boney Hay & Central (3)
5. Bourne Vale (1)
6. Chadsmead (2)
7. Chase Terrace (2)
8. Chasetown (2)
9. Colton & the Ridwares (1)
10. Curborough (2)
11. Fazeley (2)
12. Hammerwich with Wall (2)
13. Highfield (2)
14. Leomansley (3)
15. Little Aston & Stonnall (2)
16. Longdon (1)
17. Mease Valley (1)
18. Shenstone (1)
19. St John’s (3)
20. Stowe (3)
21. Summerfield & All Saints (3)
22. Whittington & Streethay (3)

=== Newcastle-under-Lyme ===
Wards from 1 April 1974 (first election 7 June 1973) to 3 May 1979:

Wards from 3 May 1979 to 2 May 2002:

Wards from 2 May 2002 to 3 May 2018:

1. Audley & Bignall End (3)
2. Bradwell (3)
3. Butt Lane (3)
4. Chesterton (3)
5. Clayton (2)
6. Cross Heath (3)
7. Halmerend (2)
8. Holditch (2)
9. Keele (2)
10. Kidsgrove (3)
11. Knutton & Silverdale (2)
12. Loggerheads & Whitmore (3)
13. Madeley (2)
14. May Bank (3)
15. Newchapel (2)
16. Porthill (2)
17. Ravenscliffe (2)
18. Seabridge (3)
19. Silverdale & Parksite (2)
20. Talke (2)
21. Thistleberry (3)
22. Town (2)
23. Westlands (3)
24. Wolstanton (3)

Wards from 3 May 2018 to present:

1. Audley (3)
2. Bradwell (3)
3. Clayton (1)
4. Crackley & Red Street (2)
5. Cross Heath (2)
6. Holditch & Chesterton (2)
7. Keele (1)
8. Kidsgrove & Ravenscliffe (3)
9. Knutton (1)
10. Loggerheads (2)
11. Madeley & Betley (2)
12. Maer & Whitmore (1)
13. May Bank (3)
14. Newchapel & Mow Cop (2)
15. Silverdale (2)
16. Talke & Butt Lane (3)
17. Thistleberry (2)
18. Town (2)
19. Westbury Park & Northwood (2)
20. Westlands (3)
21. Wolstanton (2)

=== South Staffordshire ===
Wards from 1 April 1974 (first election 7 June 1973) to 3 May 1979:

Wards from 3 May 1979 to 2 May 1991:

1. Perton (); ward abolished in 1989
2. Perton Central (); new ward added in 1989
3. Perton Dippons (); new ward added in 1989

Wards from 2 May 1991 to 1 May 2003:

1. Acton Trussel (1)
2. Bilbrook (2)
3. Bishopswood & Lapley (2)
4. Brewood & Coven (3)
5. Cheslyn Hay (3)
6. Codsall North (2)
7. Codsall South (2)
8. Essington (2)
9. Featherstone (2)
10. Great Wyrley Landywood (2)
11. Great Wyrley Town (3)
12. Huntington (2)
13. Kinver (3)
14. Lower Penn (1)
15. Pattingham & Patshull (1)
16. Penkridge North East (1)
17. Penkridge South East (2)
18. Penkridge West (1)
19. Perton Central (3)
20. Perton Dippons (2)
21. Shareshill (1)
22. Swindon (1)
23. Trysull & Seisdon (1)
24. Wombourne North (2)
25. Wombourne South East (2)
26. Wombourne South West (3)

Wards from 1 May 2003 to 4 May 2023:

1. Bilbrook (2)
2. Brewood & Coven (3)
3. Cheslyn Hay North & Saredon (2)
4. Cheslyn Hay South (2)
5. Codsall North (2)
6. Codsall South (2)
7. Essington (2)
8. Featherstone & Shareshill (2)
9. Great Wyrley Landywood (2)
10. Great Wyrley Town (3)
11. Himley & Swindon (1)
12. Huntington & Hatherton (2)
13. Kinver (3)
14. Pattingham & Patshull (1)
15. Penkridge North East & Acton Trussell (2)
16. Penkridge South East (2)
17. Penkridge West (1)
18. Perton Dippons (1)
19. Perton East (1)
20. Perton Lakeside (3)
21. Trysull & Seisdon (1)
22. Wheaton Aston, Bishopswood & Lapley (2)
23. Wombourne North & Lower Penn (3)
24. Wombourne South East (2)
25. Wombourne South West (2)

Wards from 4 May 2023 to present:

1. Bilbrook (2)
2. Brewood, Coven & Blymhill (3)
3. Cheslyn Hay Village (3)
4. Codsall (3)
5. Essington (2)
6. Featherstone, Sharehill & Saredon (2)
7. Great Wyrley Landywood (2)
8. Great Wyrley Town (2)
9. Himley & Swindon (1)
10. Huntington & Hatherton (2)
11. Kinver & Enville (3)
12. Lapley, Stretton & Wheaton Aston (1)
13. Pattingham, Trysull, Bobbington & Lower Penn (2)
14. Penkridge North & Acton Trussell (2)
15. Penkridge South & Gailey (2)
16. Perton East (1)
17. Perton Lakeside (2)
18. Perton Wrottesley (1)
19. Wombourne North (3)
20. Wombourne South (3)

=== Stafford ===
Wards from 1 April 1974 (first election 7 June 1973) to 3 May 1979:

Wards from 3 May 1979 to 1 May 2003:

Wards from 1 May 2003 to 7 May 2015:

1. Barlaston & Oulton (2)
2. Baswich (2)
3. Chartley (1)
4. Church Eaton (1)
5. Common (2)
6. Coton (2)
7. Eccleshall (3)
8. Forebridge (2)
9. Fulford (3)
10. Gnosall & Woodseaves (3)
11. Haywood & Hixon (3)
12. Highfields & Western (3)
13. Downs
14. Holmcroft (3)
15. Littleworth (3)
16. Manor (3)
17. Milford (2)
18. Milwich (1)
19. Penkside (2)
20. Rowley (2)
21. St Michael's (2)
22. Seighford (2)
23. Stonefield & Christchurch (2)
24. Swynnerton (2)
25. Tillington (2)
26. Walton (3)
27. Weeping Cross (3)

Wards from 7 May 2015 to present:

1. Barlaston (1)
2. Baswich (2)
3. Common (1)
4. Coton (2)
5. Doxey & Castletown (1)
6. Eccleshall (2)
7. Forebridge (1)
8. Fulford (2)
9. Gnosall & Woodseaves (2)
10. Haywood & Hixon (2)
11. Highfields & Western Downs (2)
12. Holmcroft (2)
13. Littleworth (2)
14. Manor (2)
15. Milford (1)
16. Milwich (2)
17. Penkside (1)
18. Rowley (1)
19. Seighford & Church Eaton (2)
20. St Michael’s & Stonefield (3)
21. Swynnerton & Oulton (2)
22. Walton (2)
23. Weeping Cross & Wildwood (2)

=== Staffordshire Moorlands ===
Wards from 1 April 1974 (first election 7 June 1973) to 6 May 1976:

Wards from 6 May 1976 to 1 May 2003:

Wards from 1 May 2003 to present:

1. Alton (1)
2. Bagnall & Stanley (1)
3. Biddulph East (3)
4. Biddulph Moor (1)
5. Biddulph North (3)
6. Biddulph South (1)
7. Biddulph West (3)
8. Brown Edge & Endon (3)
9. Caverswall (1)
10. Cellarhead (2)
11. Cheadle North East (2)
12. Cheadle South East (2)
13. Cheadle West (3)
14. Checkley (3)
15. Cheddleton (3)
16. Churnet (2)
17. Dane (1)
18. Forsbrook (3)
19. Hamps Valley (1)
20. Horton (1)
21. Ipstones (1)
22. Leek East (3)
23. Leek North (3)
24. Leek South (3)
25. Leek West (3)
26. Manifold (1)
27. Werrington (2)

=== Tamworth ===
Wards from 1 April 1974 (first election 7 June 1973) to 6 May 1976:

Wards from 6 May 1976 to 2 May 2002:

Wards from 2 May 2002 to present:

1. Amington (3)
2. Belgrave (3)
3. Bolehall (3)
4. Castle (3)
5. Glascote (3)
6. Mercian (3)
7. Spital (3)
8. Stonydelph (3)
9. Trinity (3)
10. Wilnecote (3)

== Electoral wards by constituency ==
Wards as they existed on 1 December 2020.

=== Burton and Uttoxeter ===
East Staffordshire: Abbey; Anglesey; Branston; Brizlincote; Burton; Churnet; Crown; Eton Park; Heath; Horninglow; Rolleston on Dove; Shobnall; Stapenhill; Stretton; Town; Tutbury & Outwoods; Weaver; Winshill.

=== Cannock Chase ===
Brereton & Ravenhill; Cannock East; Cannock North; Cannock South; Cannock West; Etching Hill & The Heath; Hagley; Hawks Green; Heath Hayes East & Wimblebury; Hednesford Green Heath; Hednesford North; Hednesford South; Norton Canes; Rawnsley; Western Springs.

=== Kingswinford and South Staffordshire (part) ===
South Staffordshire: Bilbrook; Codsall North; Codsall South; Himley & Swindon; Kinver; Pattingham & Patshull; Perton Dippons; Perton East; Perton Lakeside; Trysull & Seisdon; Wombourne North & Lower Penn; Wombourne South East; Wombourne South West.

=== Lichfield ===
East Staffordshire: Bagots; Needwood; Yoxall.

Lichfield: Alrewas & Fradley; Armitage with Handsacre; Boley Park; Boney Hay & Central; Chadsmead; Chase Terrace; Chasetown; Colton & the Ridwares; Curborough; Hammerwich with Wall; Highfield; Leomansley; Longdon; St. John’s; Stowe; Summerfield & All Saints; Whittington & Streethay (polling district AD).

=== Newcastle-under-Lyme ===
Newcastle-under-Lyme: Audley; Bradwell; Clayton; Crackley & Red Street; Cross Heath; Holditch & Chesterton; Keele; Knutton; Madeley & Betley; May Bank; Silverdale; Thistleberry; Town; Westbury Park & Northwood; Westlands; Wolstanton.

=== Stafford ===
Newcastle-under-Lyme: Loggerheads; Maer & Whitmore.

Stafford: Baswich; Common; Coton; Doxey & Castletown; Eccleshall; Forebridge; Gnosall & Woodseaves; Highfields & Western Downs; Holmcroft; Littleworth; Manor; Penkside; Rowley; Seighford & Church Eaton; Weeping Cross & Wildwood.

=== Staffordshire Moorlands ===
Staffordshire Moorlands: Alton; Bagnall & Stanley; Biddulph East; Biddulph Moor; Biddulph North; Biddulph South; Biddulph West; Brown Edge & Endon; Caverswall; Cellarhead; Cheadle North East; Cheadle South East; Cheadle West; Cheddleton; Churnet; Dane; Hamps Valley; Horton; Ipstones; Leek East; Leek North; Leek South; Leek West; Manifold; Werrington.

=== Stoke-on-Trent Central ===
Stoke-on-Trent: Abbey Hulton & Townsend; Bentilee & Ubberley; Birches Head & Central Forest Park; Boothen & Oak Hill; Eaton Park; Etruria & Hanley; Fenton East; Fenton West & Mount Pleasant; Hanley Park & Shelton; Hartshill & Basford; Joiner’s Square; Meir Hay; Penkhull & Stoke; Sandford Hill; Sneyd Green; Springfields & Trent Vale.

=== Stoke-on-Trent North ===
Newcastle-under-Lyme: Kidsgrove & Ravenscliffe; Newchapel & Mow Cop; Talke & Butt Lane.

Stoke-on-Trent: Baddeley, Milton & Norton; Bradeley & Chell Heath; Burslem Central; Burslem Park; Ford Green & Smallthorne; Goldenhill & Sandyford; Great Chell & Packmoor; Little Chell & Stanfield; Moorcroft; Tunstall.

=== Stoke-on-Trent South ===
Stafford: Barlaston; Fulford; Swynnerton & Oulton.

Staffordshire Moorlands: Checkley; Forsbrook.

Stoke-on-Trent: Blurton East; Blurton West & Newstead; Broadway & Longton East; Dresden & Florence; Hanford & Trentham; Hollybush & Longton West; Lightwood North & Normacot; Meir North; Meir Park; Meir South; Weston Coyney.

=== Stone, Great Wyrley and Penkridge ===
South Staffordshire: Brewood & Coven; Cheslyn Hay North & Saredon; Cheslyn Hay South; Essington; Featherstone & Shareshill; Great Wyrley Landywood; Great Wyrley Town; Huntington & Hatherton; Penkridge North East & Acton Trussell; Penkridge South East; Penkridge West; Wheaton Aston, Bishopswood & Lapley.

Stafford: Haywood & Hixon; Milford; Milwich; St. Michael’s & Stonefield; Walton.

=== Tamworth ===
Lichfield: Bourne Vale; Fazeley; Little Aston & Stonnall; Mease Valley; Shenstone; Whittington & Streethay (polling districts JA, YA, YB, YC, ZA & ZB).

Tamworth: Amington; Belgrave; Bolehall; Castle; Glascote; Mercian; Spital; Stonydelph; Trinity; Wilnecote.

== See also ==
- List of parliamentary constituencies in Staffordshire
