= Hammerwich =

Village in Staffordshire, England

Coordinates: 52°40′00″N 1°54′04″W

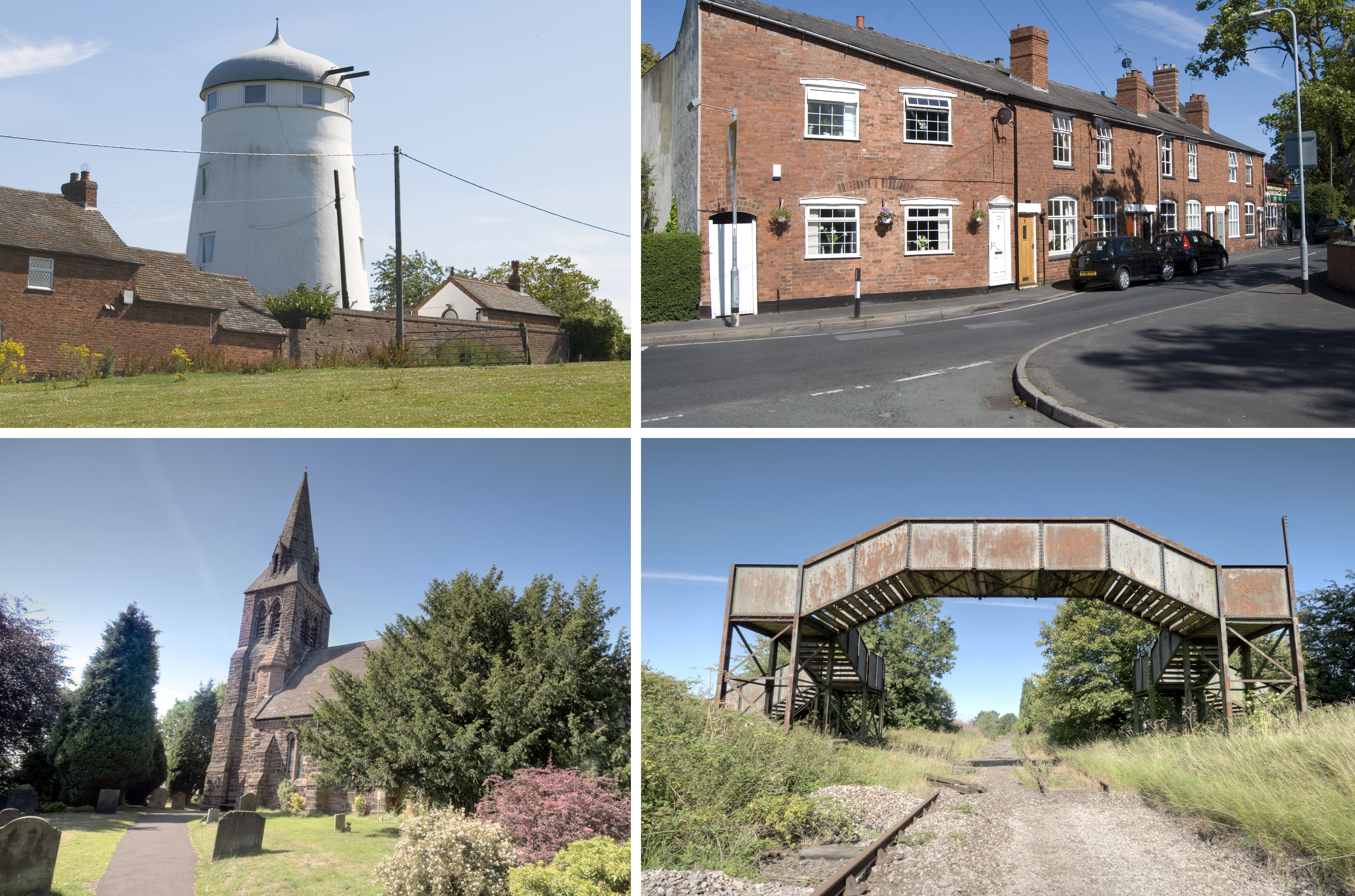
- From top left: Hammerwich Mill; Hall Lane; St John Baptist Church; Hammerwich railway station

- Location within Staffordshire
- Population: 691 (Census 2011)
- OS grid reference: SK065075
- District: Lichfield
- Shire county: Staffordshire
- Region: West Midlands
- Country: England
- Sovereign state: United Kingdom
- Post town: Burntwood
- Postcode district: WS7
- Dialling code: 01543
- Police: Staffordshire
- Fire: Staffordshire
- Ambulance: West Midlands
- UK Parliament: Lichfield

Hammerwich is a small village and civil parish in the Lichfield District, in Staffordshire, England. It is southeast of Burntwood.

== Name ==
The name may derive from hamor (Old English: a hammer) and wīc (Old English: a place of industry, specialist agriculture or trading), indicating a smithy or metal-working site.

Charcoal burning, nail making, agriculture and coal mining have all been prevalent in the village over the years.

== Culture ==
Amenities in the village at present include a community centre, a Women's Institute hall and St John the Baptist Church. There are also numerous green lanes, footpaths and streams in the surrounding countryside.

== Anglo-Saxon archaeology ==
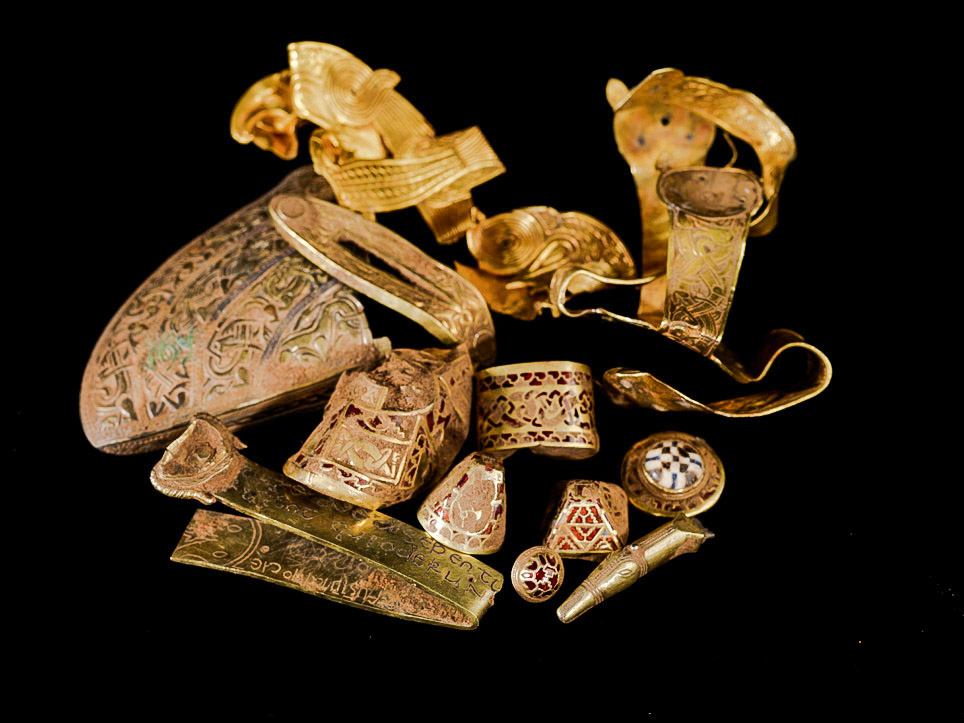
The Staffordshire Hoard

In July 2009, the Staffordshire Hoard, a collection of over 3,500 items of Anglo-Saxon gold and silver metalwork, was found in a field 0.7 miles (1.1 km) south west of the village

== See also ==
- Listed buildings in Hammerwich
