= M6 Toll =

Toll motorway in England bypassing a busy section of the M6

M6 Toll
- Midland Expressway
- M6 Toll highlighted in blue Shown with UK motorway network

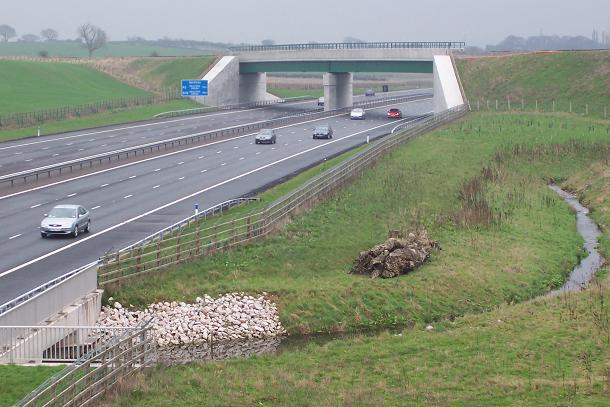
- Looking south near Hammerwich, 2005

Route information
- Part of E05
- Maintained by Midland Expressway Ltd. (Note: Under concession from the Department for Transport until 2053, on which date the motorway will be returned to the government.)
- Length: 27 mi (43 km)
- Existed: 2003–present
- History: Opened and Completed: 2003

Major junctions
- Southeast end: Coleshill
- M6 motorway; M42 motorway; M42 motorway; M6 motorway
- Northwest end: Cannock

Location
- Country: United Kingdom
- Counties: Warwickshire; West Midlands; Staffordshire
- Primary destinations: Lichfield; Brownhills; Cannock

Road network
- Roads in the United Kingdom; Motorways; A and B road zones

The M6 Toll, referred to on some signs as the Midland Expressway (originally named the Birmingham Northern Relief Road or BNRR), and stylised as M6toll, connects M6 Junction 3a at the Coleshill Interchange to M6 Junction 11A at Wolverhampton with 27 miles (43 km) of six-lane motorway.

The M6 Toll is the only major toll road in Great Britain, and has two payment plazas, Great Wyrley Toll Plaza for northbound and Weeford Toll Plaza for southbound. The northbound toll plaza is situated between junctions T6 and T7, and the southbound between junctions T4 and T3. The weekday contactless card cost is £12 for a car and £20.90 for a Heavy Goods Vehicle.

The M6 Toll is part of the (unsigned in the UK) E-road E05 and is subject to the same regulations and policing as other motorways in the UK. It has one service station along its 27-mile (43 km) stretch, Norton Canes services.

== History ==
=== Planning and construction ===
Proposals for a new publicly funded motorway were circulated in 1980. It was originally to be called the A446(M) Birmingham Northern Relief Road (BNRR) and designed to alleviate the increasing congestion on the M6 through Birmingham and the Black Country in England, as well as improving road links to neighbouring parts of Staffordshire and North Warwickshire. This was the busiest section of the M6, carrying up to 180,000 vehicles per day when it was designed to carry only 72,000.

Five alternative routes were put for consultation in 1980 and a preferred route was published in 1986. In 1989 there was a public inquiry relating to a publicly funded motorway.

In 1989 it was announced that it would be built privately and a competition took place which was won by Midland Expressway Limited in 1991. The contract was for a 53-year concession to build and operate the road as an early form of public private partnership with the operator paying for the construction and recouping its costs by setting and collecting tolls, allowing for a 3-year construction period followed by 50 years of operation. At the end of this period the infrastructure would be returned to the Government. Toll rates are set at the discretion of the operator at six-monthly intervals and there is no cap on the rates charged.

There was a second public inquiry from relating to the new scheme in 1994–1995 and a decision to go ahead in 1997. A legal challenge was made by the "Alliance against BNRR" which was cleared in 1998.

Midland Expressway Limited contracted out the construction of the road to a consortium of major contractors Carillion, Alfred McAlpine, Balfour Beatty and Amec (together known as CAMBBA).

Build phase

Site clearance started in 2000, major construction work began over the summer of 2002 and the road opened in December 2003.

2.5 million books, including many Mills & Boon novels, were pulped and mixed into the tarmac surface to help absorb water.

In August 2003, freight operators indicated that they planned to keep their vehicles on the heavily congested M6 through Birmingham rather than send them on the new motorway due to high fees. The AA Motoring Trust said it welcomed the decision to make lorries pay a premium rate explaining that "Car drivers find lorries intimidating and they frequently hold up traffic on motorways when overtaking each other."

The road was partially opened on 9 December 2003 for traffic entering from local junctions, then fully opened on 14 December 2003.

=== First year of operation ===
On 10 January 2004, five weeks after opening, a short section of the road near Sutton Coldfield was reduced to one lane to allow for repairs to an uneven surface.

On 23 July 2004 prices for heavy goods vehicles (HGVs) were reduced from £10 to £6 to encourage them to use the route "for a trial period".

=== Traffic levels ===
In December 2004, one year after opening, Friends of the Earth issued a press release expressing concern that, faced with lower than expected traffic numbers, Midland Expressway were trying to attract new traffic-generating developments to greenbelt and greenfield sites in the M6 Toll Corridor. and in April 2005 the Royal Institution of Chartered Surveyors reported that there was strong interest in the commercial property market place around the M6 Toll "zone of influence".

In May 2005, the Macquarie Infrastructure Group reported that traffic figures were "disappointing". In August 2005 the Highways Agency confirmed in its own "one year" study showing that usage had settled at around 50,000 vehicles per day (lower than the predicted 74,000) but that traffic volumes on the M6 had reduced slightly.

From 2008, traffic levels started to fall. Traffic in the first quarter of 2009 was 39,000 vehicles-per-day (Monday-Friday figures), but recovered to reach 54,000 in the second quarter of 2015.

Traffic levels are not published on a regular basis, but can be found in company financial reports published in press, generally around about September the following year.

Year	Vehicles per day
2005	50,000
2006	40,278
2007	41,473
2009 Q1	39,000
2012	30,541
2014	45,890
2015	54,000
2017	50,030
2019	46,000
2020	26,000
2022	46,715
2024	48,463

=== Historical toll rates ===
Daytime cash / contactless card prices for various vehicle classes since opening:

Date introduced	Class 1 (e.g. Motorbike)	Class 2 (e.g. Car)	Class 3 (e.g. Car with trailer)	Class 4 (e.g. Van)	Class 5 (e.g. HGV)
9 December 2003	£1.00	£2.00	£5.00	£5.00	£10.00
23 July 2004	£1.00	£2.00	£5.00	£5.00	£6.00
16 August 2004	£2.00	£3.00	£6.00	£6.00	£6.00
14 June 2005	£2.50	£3.50	£7.00	£7.00	£7.00
1 January 2008	£2.50	£4.50	£8.00	£9.00	£9.00
1 January 2009	£2.70	£4.70	£8.40	£9.40	£9.40
1 March 2010	£2.70	£5.00	£9.00	£10.00	£10.00
1 March 2011	£3.00	£5.30	£9.60	£10.60	£10.60
1 March 2012	£3.00	£5.50	£10.00	£11.00	£11.00
7 August 2017	£3.00	£5.90	£10.00	£11.00	£11.00
8 July 2021	£3.30	£7.00	£10.70	£12.30	£12.60
22 August 2022	£3.70	£7.60	£11.60	£13.30	£13.80
30 August 2023	£4.20	£8.60	£12.60	£14.90	£15.50
13 October 2023	£4.70	£8.90	£12.90	£15.30	£15.90
13 May 2024	£4.70	£9.70	£14.00	£16.60	£17.20
24 August 2025	£5.10	£10.50	£15.00	£17.60	£18.20

There is a 5% discount for using an electronic tag, which allows a vehicle to automatically pass through the toll gates while the toll is debited from a prepaid account. Leasing of one tag currently costs £1.00/month. In addition, a monthly administrative fee of £2.00 is charged if the user wishes to receive a postal statement.

Exit/entry at some of the intermediate junctions away from the main toll booths entails a reduced toll, typically £1 less than the full fee.

=== M6 Expressway ===
There was a proposal to build a new toll motorway, called the M6 Expressway running from the end of the M6 Toll to Knutsford, where much of the traffic leaves the M6 for Manchester. It was announced on 20 July 2006 that this proposal had been abandoned due to excessive costs and anticipated construction problems.

== Tolls ==
=== Prices ===
From 13 May 2024, M6 Toll is divided into three zones. Tolls depend on the number of zones entered, determined by automatic number-plate recognition (ANPR).

Vehicle class	Payment at toll booth or Lite account			Payment via breeze account		
Vehicle class	3 zones	2 zones	1 zone	3 zones	2 zones	1 zone
Class 1 (e.g. motorbike)	£5.60	£4.60	£3.70	£4.80	£4.00	£2.00
Class 2 (e.g. car)	£11.40	£9.00	£6.60	£9.80	£8.00	£4.00
Class 3 (e.g. car & trailer)	£16.20	£13.50	£10.00	£14.10	£11.90	£6.00
Class 4 (e.g. van or motorhome)	£19.20	£16.50	£13.90	£16.90	£15.00	£9.00
Class 5 & 6 (e.g. HGV or coach)	£19.90	£17.40	£15.10	£17.50	£15.90	£9.00
Class 7	£39.00					
Class 8	£59.00					
Class 9	£138.00					
Class 10	£373.50					

=== Collection ===
Tolls can be paid by credit/debit card payments, in advance via an M6 Toll tag, or by registering online for a Lite or 'breeze' account. Cash payments are not accepted.

Vehicles are classified electronically at the toll booths according to their number of wheels, number of axles and height at first axle. Thus vehicles with trailers are charged extra and some large models of 4x4 are classified as vans.

Failure to pay the toll for using the motorway is a civil offence; anyone attempting to do so will be issued with an unpaid toll notice and required to send payment. If it is not paid within two days a £10 administration charge is added, plus further costs will be added if the toll is still unpaid after 14 days.

An M6 Toll tag is an electronic toll collection device attached to a vehicle's windscreen, which records the vehicle's passage through toll plazas on the M6 Toll.

Each tag can only be used with the registered number plate and has a unique account. All accounts on the M6 Toll are pre-paid, and must contain a positive balance, sufficient to cover the cost of the vehicle's toll, in order for the vehicle to be allowed through the toll gate. If the balance is sufficient, the tag will beep once and the barrier at the toll gate will automatically raise. If the balance is low (fewer than three journeys remaining), the tag will beep twice. If the balance of the account cannot cover the cost of the toll, the barrier will remain closed and an alternative method of payment must be used. Balances can be topped up automatically once a month using Direct Debit or credit card, or by cheque.

The tags contain a microchip which uses radio-frequency identification (RFID) technology. Physically, the tag resembles a DART-Tag, previously used to pay the tolls on the Dartford Crossing. The two systems do not interoperate.

ANPR Systems

A new tolling system involving Automatic Number Plate Recognition (ANPR) technology is currently being trialed on the M6 Toll as part of the Road Ahead strategy.

The ANPR cameras will identify licence plate data, removing the need for card payments at the toll plazas and replacing them with a remote payment system linked to online accounts. It will enable seamless end to end journeys and mean customers can manage all transactions via the M6 Toll website, whether for a single vehicle or larger fleets spread across a number of depots.

The ANPR system was Initially launched on 8 April 2021 as a pilot project for business customers, with Maritime, one of the UK's largest logistics operators, becoming the first vehicles to pay for their journeys on the M6toll via the new tolling system.

ANPR was made generally available through the launch of the online breeze account in May 2024. Breeze uses an automatic top up system and no need to stop at toll barriers. It also offers a discount of between 8% and 35%.

On 8 November 2025, a Lite account was launched where drivers can register their car number plates online and have tolls paid automatically once registered, with no need to stop at the toll barriers. The Lite account does not require top ups and therefore holding an account balance but, unlike breeze, offers no discount on paying with a physical contactless card.

== Midland Expressway Limited ==
The contract to build and operate the M6 Toll was won by Midland Expressway Limited (MEL) in 1991. In 2005 MEL reported an operating profit of around £16 million. Total revenue was £45 million, with staff and other operating costs amounting to £11.4 million and depreciation of £17.4 million. Taking into account net interest costs of around £43 million, that leaves an overall loss of £26.5 million in 2005 – their first full financial year.

As of June 2005, MEL was 100% owned by Macquarie Infrastructure Group (MIG) of Australia, which operated several tolled roads in Australia and North America. Long term debt was £819 million as of 30 June 2005. Disappointing traffic figures for 2005 led to a price rise in June, and MIG Chief Executive Steve Allen commented in the Australian newspaper The Age, "What we need is to slow down the M6".

Business leaders in Staffordshire, now effectively closer to London, welcomed the opening of the road, saying that it would make it easier to do business there.

In June 2006 the decision to not increase tolls was put down to disappointing traffic levels and led to a reduction in value for the owner.

In 2010 MIG was split into two, and the M6 Toll is now managed by Macquarie Atlas Roads.

The road was sold to IFM Investors in June 2017.

== Criticisms ==
=== Design ===
The M6 Toll lacks a proper link with the M54, which joins the M6 1.5 miles (2.4 km) south of the northern end of the M6 Toll. Plans are afoot to link them eventually but for the time being traffic between the two has to use either the slow and often congested A460 to M54 J1, or go from M54 J2 via the A449 and A5 to M6 J12 – an extra 4 miles/7 km.

=== Protest during planning and construction ===
Environmental campaigners opposed the road, from its inception. While the road was being built, some advocates of direct action dug tunnels under Moneymore Cottage and two large underground bunkers in an adjacent wood named the Greenwood Camp. The camp was in the path of the road in order to frustrate and delay the work. Peter Faulding, a confined space rescue specialist from Specialist Group International who removed Swampy the anti-roads protester from the A30 protest and from the Newbury Bypass tunnels, was brought in to safely remove a number of protesters tunnelled deep underground. The tunnels were very complex and on different levels in Moneymore Cottage. Operation Encompass as it was called by the police was run by the Under sheriff of Staffordshire Mr John James, the eviction operation ran for fourteen days enabling construction to begin.

Friends of the Earth claimed that the road would not relieve much traffic from the West Midlands conurbation as most users using the M6 in that area began or ended their journeys within the conurbation and so the M6 Toll would offer no advantage to them. Their campaign co-ordinator for the West Midlands, Chris Crean, said that although the £900 million cost of the road had been borne by private companies, the money should have been spent on public transport.

=== House of Commons Library briefing paper ===
In 2017, the House of Commons Library produced a briefing paper on road tolls written by Louise Butcher, which included the M6 Toll. The paper suggested that "The M6 toll road has had mixed success; it is unusual in that it is in direct competition with a free motorway running along the same route; this may account for some of the difficulties it has experienced since opening more than a decade ago."

== Features ==
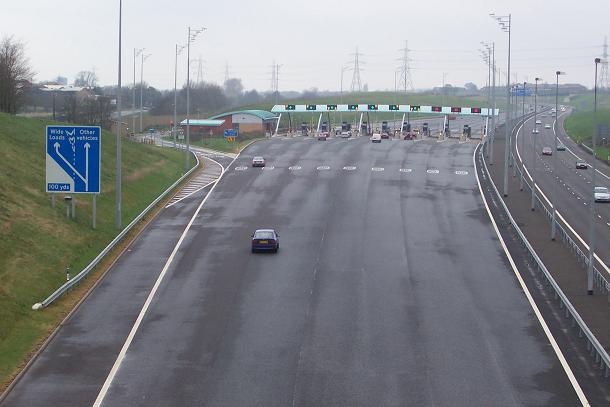
Toll plaza for northbound traffic at Great Wyrley

The M6 Toll has several intermediary junctions, and some were designed originally to limit access to discourage local traffic. Like modern toll roads in continental Europe, the M6 Toll still uses toll plazas, despite many other tolls in the UK switching to electronic toll collection (ETC) or being abolished.

The construction of the motorway threatened the restoration of the Lichfield Canal, which was cut by the motorway's route. The Lichfield and Hatherton Canals Restoration Trust campaigned and raised funds to build an aqueduct to carry the canal over the motorway.

In 2014/2015 Lichfield and Hatherton Canals Restoration Trust received a Social Investment Business (SIB) grant of £336,000 which will enable the Trust to buy land on either side of the aqueduct and carry out the necessary work to rebuild the canal to bring the aqueduct into use.

In April 2015, Midland Expressway Limited donated £50,000 to Lichfield and Hatherton Canals Restoration Trust to honour an undertaking they made when the M6 Toll was built. The donation is a "substantial contribution" towards the cost of reinstating the Crane Brook Culvert which was removed when the motorway was built.

=== Norton Canes Motorway Services Area ===
The motorway's only service station is situated at Norton Canes, between junctions T6 and T7. It is operated by Roadchef, which has a 25-year lease on the site and the company also uses the site as its head office.

Opened on 9 March 2004, it is positioned so that it can be accessed before reaching the main toll plaza in either direction. In 2019, the Motorway Services User Survey found that Norton Canes had the highest customer satisfaction of any motorway services in the UK. In 2021, Norton Canes was voted in the top 5 UK service stations in a Which consumer survey, and was the highest positioned Midlands-based service station in the same survey.

=== Charitable Work ===
Since the road opened in 2003, M6 Toll's 'Drive for Charity' initiative has given away more than £1 million to good causes. This has included a regular cash fund of up to £1,500 given away every month to charities, schools, sports clubs or voluntary organisations helping to enhance the lives of local people.

The M6 Toll also supports the Midlands Air Ambulance charity. The funding provided enabled the organisation to launch the 'Sky Champs' education programme, an online learning management system, and range of education packs, launched at the start of the COVID-19 pandemic as schools were heavily impacted by the national lockdown

M6 Toll also provides regular support to the 'Ride to the Wall' initiative, providing free passage for bikers attending the event at the National Memorial Arboretum in October each year.

== Junctions ==
The towns, cities and roads listed are those given on road signs on the motorway as the junction is approached.

M6 Toll motorway junctions
Junction	Coordinates	Northbound exits	Tolls	Southbound exits	Tolls	Toll zone
M6 J11A	52.6682°N 2.0716°W	Motorway continues as M6 towards Stafford	None	Start of motorway	None	—
T8	52.6649°N 2.0572°W	(M6 South), Wolverhampton A460	None	No access (on-slip only)	None	C
T7	52.6725°N 2.0154°W	Walsall, Cannock A34, Rugeley A460	None	No access (on-slip only)	None	C
	52.6677°N 2.0003°W	Toll plaza				C
	52.6626°N 1.9693°W	Norton Canes services				B
T6	52.6621°N 1.926°W	Brownhills, Burntwood A5195	Exit	Brownhills, Burntwood A5195	Exit	B
T5	52.6478°N 1.8348°W	No access (on-slip only)	None	Lichfield A5148, Burton A38	Exit	B
T4	52.6384°N 1.8111°W	Burton, Lichfield A38, Tamworth A5	Exit	Tamworth, (M42 North) A5	Exit	B
	52.6232°N 1.8007°W			Toll plaza		B
T3	52.57966°N 1.77773°W	No access		Birmingham, Sutton Coldfield A38		B
T3	52.5658°N 1.7654°W	Sutton Coldfield A38	Exit	No access (on-slip only)	Entry	B
T2	52.5516°N 1.7368°W	No entry or exit	None	A446 (M42 north) – Coleshill	None	A
T1	52.5293°N 1.7296°W	Split for M42 northbound, entry from A4097 (M42 J9, A446)	None	Merge with M42 southbound	None	A
M42 J8	52.5091°N 1.7255°W	Merge from M6 J4a southbound	None	No entry or exit	None	—
M42 J7A	52.4815°N 1.7103°W	Merge from M42 northbound	None	Split for M42 southbound	None	—
M6 J3A	52.4739°N 1.6717°W	Begins from M6 northbound	None	Merge with M6 southbound	None	—
Incomplete access; Tolled

The southernmost section of the M6 Toll, south of Junction T1, is shared by traffic using the M42. Vehicles using only this five-mile (8 km) section are not charged a toll fee.

== Statutory instruments ==
Each motorway in England requires that a legal document called a statutory instrument be published, detailing the route of the road, before it can be built. The dates given on these statutory instruments relate to when the document was published, and not when the road was built. Provided below is a list (possibly incomplete) of the statutory instruments relating to the M6 Toll.

- "Statutory Instrument 1998 No. 121: The Birmingham Northern Relief Road and Connecting Roads Scheme 1998". opsi.gov.uk.
- "Statutory Instrument 1998 No. 124: The Birmingham Northern Relief Road Toll Order 1998". opsi.gov.uk.
- "Statutory Instrument 2003 No. 2186: The M6 Toll (Collection of Tolls) Regulations 2003". opsi.gov.uk.
- "Statutory Instrument 2003 No. 2187: The M6 Toll Wide Load Routes (Speed Limit) Regulations 2003". opsi.gov.uk.
- "Statutory Instrument 2003 No. 2188: The M6 Toll (Speed Limit) Regulations 2003". opsi.gov.uk.

== See also ==
- List of motorways in the United Kingdom
- Shunpiking, the avoidance or boycott of toll roads
