= Council House, Brownhills =

Municipal building in Brownhills, West Midlands, England

The Council House
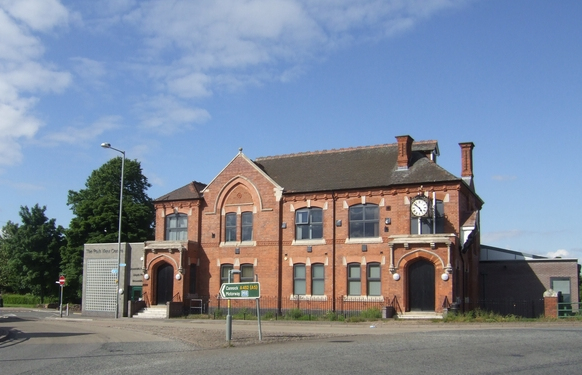
- The Council House, Brownhills

- Shown in West Midlands
- 52.6491°N 1.9358°W
- Location: Chester Road North, Brownhills

History
- Built: 1882

Site notes
- Architect: John Siddalls
- Architectural style: Elizabethan style

The Council House is a former municipal building in Chester Road North, Brownhills, West Midlands, England. The building, which is now used as a health centre, is a locally listed building.

== History ==
The local board of health, which was formed in 1877, initially held their meetings in the local school board, but, after finding this arrangement unsatisfactory, decided to commission its own offices in 1880. The site they chose was open land adjacent to a bridge across the South Staffordshire line. The building was designed by the board's surveyor, John Siddalls, in the Elizabethan style, built by Messrs T. and E. Cresswell in red brick with stone dressings at a cost of £2,700 and was completed in 1882.

The design involved an asymmetrical main frontage with five bays facing onto Chester Road North. The end bays, which slightly projected forward, featured porches with arched doorways flanked by Doric order columns supporting canopies; there were casement windows on the first floor and pavilion roofs above. The second bay on the left was fenestrated by pairs of casement windows on both floors with a stone arch and a gable above. The other two bays were fenestrated by pairs of casement windows on the ground floor and by single casement windows on the first floor. Internally, the principal rooms were the board room, the assembly room, the courtroom and various offices for board officials.

In the late 19th century, the courtroom was used as the venue for the local petty session hearings. A horse drawn fire engine was stored in a yard behind the building and a fire bell, with which to summon the local firemen, was installed under a canopy on the east side of the building.

Following implementation of the Local Government Act 1894, the area became an urban district, with the building as its headquarters, in 1894. A projecting clock, financed out of funds collected to celebrate the coronation of George V and Mary, was designed and manufactured by W. F. Evans and Sons of Handsworth and installed on the front of the building in 1911. It was refurbished as part of the celebrations for the Festival of Britain in 1951.

The building continued to serve as the headquarters of the urban district council for much of the 20th century, but ceased to be the local seat of government when the enlarged Aldridge-Brownhills Urban District Council was formed in Aldridge in 1966. By the 1980s, the building was in use as the offices for a local construction company. In the early 21st century, after many years of neglect, the building was refurbished and the site redeveloped by a partnership of Walsall Council and a local developer, Matrix Realty Group. The works, which involved the creation of a new public library, a computer centre and a health centre, known as the Park View Centre, as well as the refurbishment of the clock, were completed in June 2006.
