= St James' Church, Brownhills =

Anglican church in Brownhills, West Midlands, England

- St James Church, Brownhills with Ogley Hay
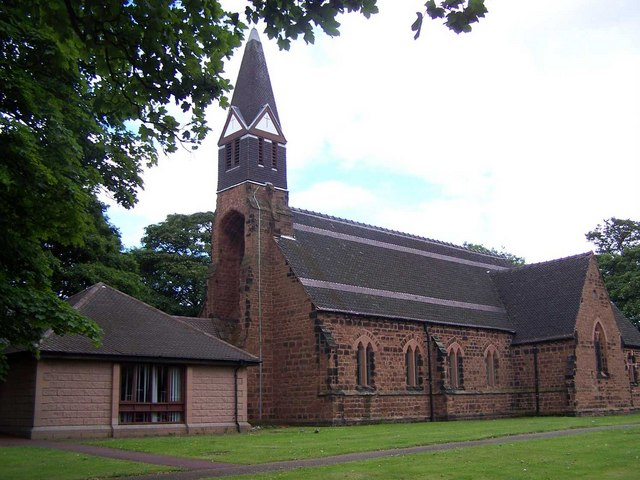
- St James Church, Brownhills with Ogley Hay
- St James' Church, Brownhills
- 52.64701°N 1.92865°W
- Location: Brownhills, Metropolitan Borough of Walsall, West Midlands
- Country: England
- Denomination: Anglican
- Website: www.stjameschurchbrownhills.co.uk

History
- Status: Parish Church
- Dedication: Saint James the Just

Architecture
- Functional status: Active

Administration
- Province: Canterbury
- Diocese: Lichfield
- Archdeaconry: Walsall
- Parish: Brownhills

St James' Church is the parish church of Brownhills, Clayhanger and Ogley Hay in the West Midlands, England. It is an active place of worship serving the town of Brownhills and the suburbs of Clayhanger and Ogley Hay and also acts as a community hub.

The church was built in 1850–1851 to serve the parish of Ogley Hay. The ecclesiastical parish was later renamed "Brownhills with Ogley Hay", and Clayhanger was added to the parish in the 1990s.
