= Brownhills West =

Coordinates: 52.658855°N 1.952675°W

- Location within the West Midlands
- OS grid reference: SK034068
- Metropolitan borough: Walsall
- Metropolitan county: West Midlands
- Region: West Midlands
- Country: England
- Sovereign state: United Kingdom
- Post town: WALSALL
- Postcode district: WS8
- Dialling code: 01543
- Police: West Midlands
- Fire: West Midlands
- Ambulance: West Midlands
- UK Parliament: Birmingham

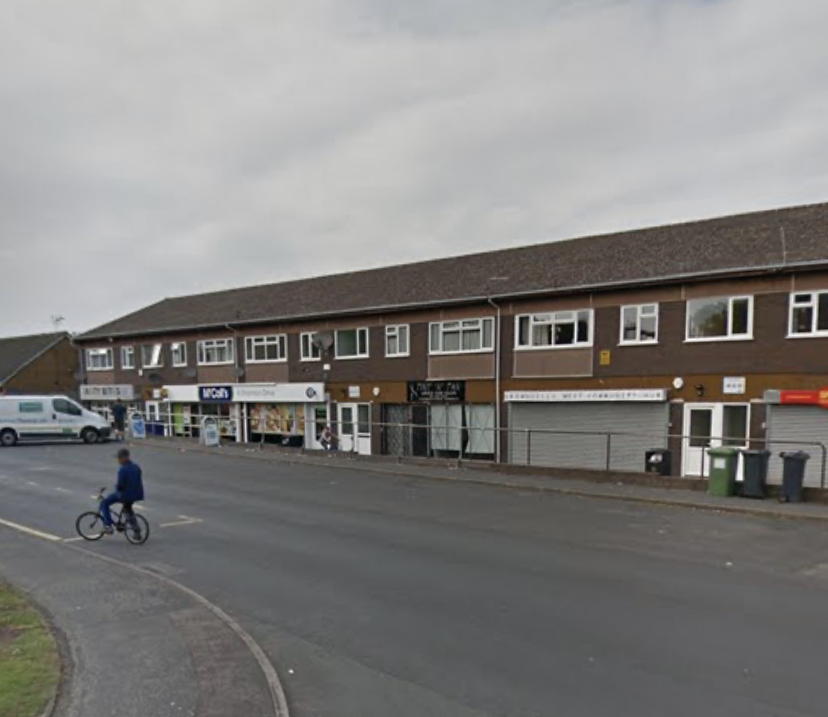
Brownhills West

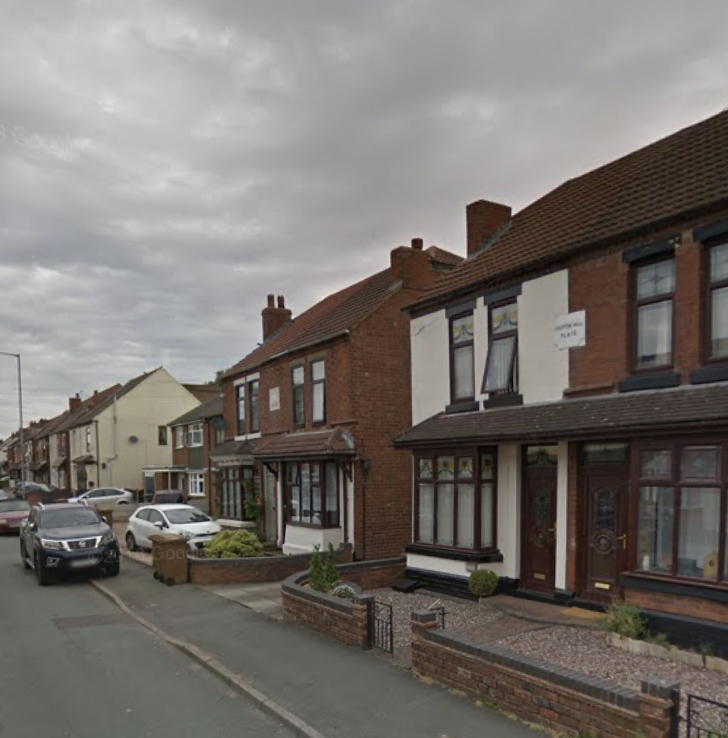

Brownhills West is a suburban village of Brownhills in the Walsall Metropolitan Borough and forms part of the border of the West Midlands and Staffordshire. It is an unparished area of Brownhills, lying on the border with Cannock and Burntwood respectively, it is still part of the Walsall borough. It lies next to the suburbs of Newtown, Ogley Hay and Shire Oak of Brownhills.

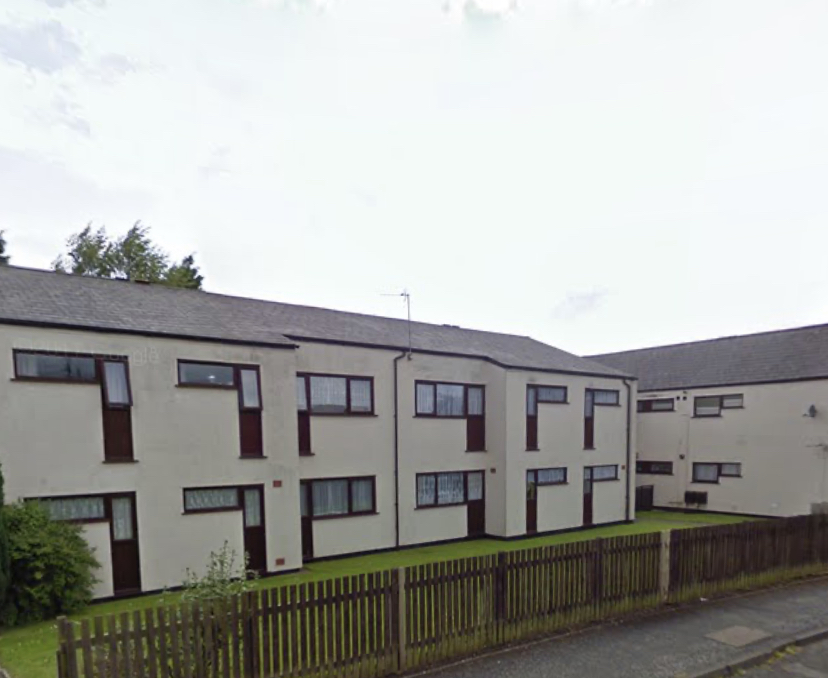

Brownhills West homes a council estate known locally as “The West”. Crime in Brownhills West has been an issue over the years with antisocial behaviour & drug offences being rife within the area.

It is located on the south bank of Chasewater reservoir, and Brownhills West railway station is the southern terminus of the Chasewater Railway.

The main local transport is provided by Bus with routes to Cannock, Walsall & Birmingham being major routes of the area.
