= Shire Oak, Walsall =

Suburb of Brownhills in West Midlands, England

Coordinates: 52.638058°N 1.927517°W

Shire Oak
- Suburb
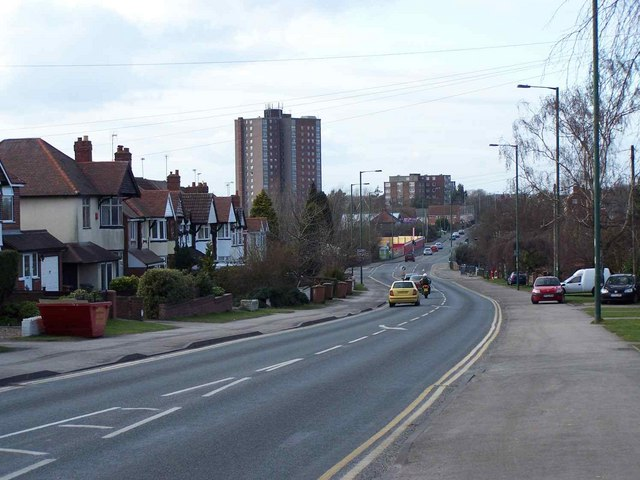
- Shire Oak, Brownhills

- Location within the West Midlands
- OS grid reference: SK052044
- Metropolitan borough: Walsall
- Metropolitan county: West Midlands
- Region: West Midlands
- Country: England
- Sovereign state: United Kingdom
- Post town: BROWNHILLS
- Postcode district: WS8
- Dialling code: 01922
- Police: West Midlands
- Fire: West Midlands
- Ambulance: West Midlands
- UK Parliament: Aldridge-Brownhills

Shire Oak is a suburban area of the Metropolitan Borough of Walsall near Brownhills, in the county of West Midlands, England.

== Geography ==
The area is close to Walsall Wood and includes the crossroads where the A452/Chester Road meets the A461/Lichfield Road between Lichfield and Walsall. The boundary with Staffordshire is nearby.

== History ==
The Shire Oak tree is mentioned in 1533.

Shire Oak is noted in Shaw's History and Antiquities of Staffordshire of 1798 under Stonall, in connection with the Shire Oak Tree at the boundary of Shenstone parish and Walsall Wood, a ¼ mile from Shire Oak Farm on Shire Oak Hill.

On 31 December 1894 Shire Oak became a civil parish, formed from the part of Shenstone in Brownhills Urban District. The Shire Oak Tree had been completely removed by the mid-1890s. Between the 1901 and 1951 census, the number of houses occupied in Shire Oak gradually increased each decade. The 1901 census shows the parish had a total of 212 occupied dwellings and by the time of the 1951 census this had increased to 430. In 1951 the parish had a population of 1,587.

On 1 April 1966 Shire Oak parish was abolished; part of its area was included in the new Aldridge-Brownhills Urban District and the remainder in the parish of Hammerwich.

== Nature reserve ==
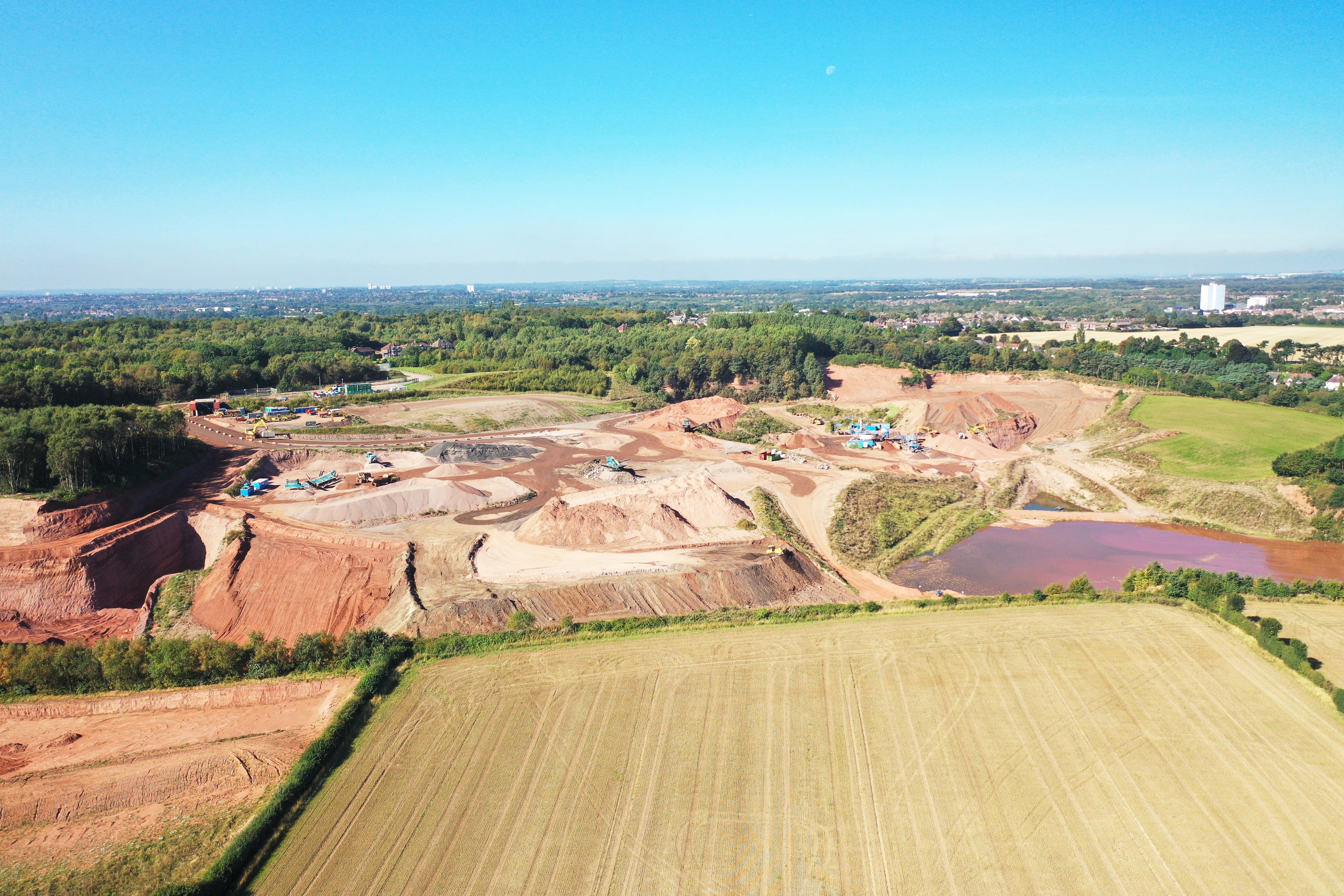
JPE Shire Oak Quarry in 2019

A former sand and gravel quarry off Chester Road has been made into Shire Oak Park Local Nature Reserve, a habitat of trees, meadow and heathland. In summer it is a migratory home of the willow warbler. The reserve is also a geosite where quarrying has revealed exposures of Triassic Chester Formation sandstone. The quarry was on the site of Shireoak Hill Farm. A 19th century marl pit was on the site before small scale quarrying took place in the 1930s. Quarrying was interrupted by the Second World War, when the site was commandeered for testing tanks and driver training. After the War quarrying recommenced on a larger scale, until discontinued in 1978. An operational quarry is close by.

== Public houses ==
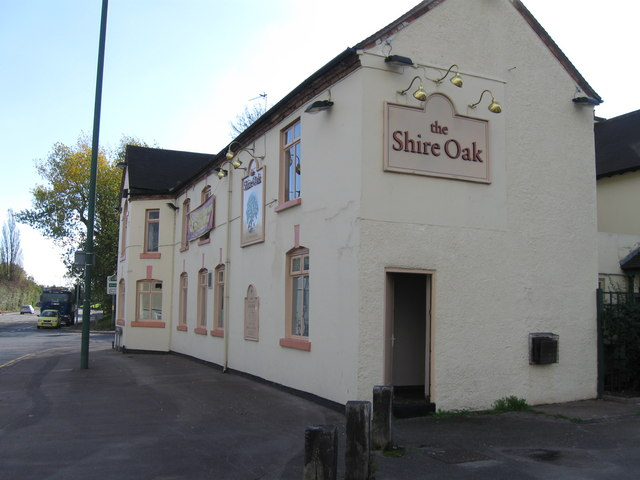
The Shire Oak Pub

At the crossroads of the Lichfield Road (A461) and the Chester Road (A452) stands the "Shire Oak" public house. The "Royal Oak" off Chester Road opened in 1937 but closed in June 2015 and has since been left abandoned. Plans to construct housing on the site were originally proposed, however, these were later withdrawn due to the "Cannock Chase Tax". This is a tax charged by Cannock Chase District council for new developments within 9 miles (14 km) of the Cannock Chase Special Area of Conservation. The "Anchor" closed in 2023 and a plan for a 90 bedroom care home was approved for the site. Later that year the pub was the subject of an arson attack. As of February 2025, construction of the care home is ongoing.

== School ==
Shire Oak Academy, a school for 11 to 18 year olds is on Lichfield Road, Walsall Wood.

== Sandhills ==
Sandhills is a settlement adjoining Shire Oak at the boundary of the West Midlands county and Staffordshire. It is 1 mile (1.6 km) southeast of Brownhills, along the A461 road midway between Lichfield and Walsall. The boundary between West Midlands county to the north west and Staffordshire to the south east follows the rear boundaries of the properties along Lichfield Road (the A461) at Sandhills, including the hamlet in Walsall. Nearby is the village of Stonnall. Sandhills is home to Shire Oak House, a mid-19th century villa converted to a residential care home for the elderly.

A bus service operated by Chaserider buses connects Sandhills to Lichfield, Aldridge and Walsall.

A branch of the Wyrley and Essington Canal, known as the "Sandhill Branch Canal" or "Sandhill's Arm", terminated at a wharf and canalside buildings near Sandhills Farm. The branch had fallen into disuse by 1903.
