= Roy Horobin =

English footballer (1935–2012)

Personal information
- Date of birth: 10 March 1935
- Place of birth: Brownhills, England
- Date of death: 29 August 2012 (aged 77)
- Place of death: Birmingham, England
- Position: Forward

Youth career
- ?–1952: West Bromwich Albion

Senior career*
Years	Team	Apps	(Gls)
1952–1958	West Bromwich Albion	54	(6)
1958–1962	Notts County	123	(37)
1962–1964	Peterborough United	80	(20)
1964–1965	Crystal Palace	4	(0)
1965–?	Weymouth	?	(?)
- * Club domestic league appearances and goals

Roy Horobin (10 March 1935 – 29 August 2012) was an English, retired professional footballer who played as a forward. He made a total of 261 appearances (63 goals) in the Football League, for West Bromwich Albion, Notts County, Peterborough United and Crystal Palace. He also played non-league football for Weymouth.

== Playing career ==
Horobin was born in Brownhills, then in Staffordshire, now part of West Midlands, and began his playing career as an apprentice at West Bromwich Albion in 1950, signing professional terms in 1952. Between then and 1958 he made 54 appearances for the club in the Football League scoring six goals.

In 1958, Horobin transferred to Notts County, where he made 123 appearances (37 goals) between then and 1962. He then moved on again to Peterborough United where he scored 20 goals in 80 appearances over the next two seasons. On 2 July 1964, Horobin signed for Crystal Palace but after only four League appearances (plus 3 in the FA Cup) moved into non-league football with Weymouth in 1965.

== Post-retirement ==
Horobin finished his playing career at Weymouth and after a brief career as a journalist, became youth development officer at West Bromwich Albion, a post he held from 1973 to 1986.

Roy Horobin died on 29 August 2012, aged 77; he had been suffering from Parkinson's disease.
