= Brownhills railway station =

Disused railway station in England

Brownhills
- A train passes through Brownhills in 1909

General information
- Location: Brownhills and Clayhanger, Walsall; England
- Coordinates: 52.6494°N 1.9346°W
- Grid reference: SK045057
- Platforms: 2

Other information
- Status: Disused

History
- Original company: South Staffordshire Railway
- Pre-grouping: London and North Western Railway
- Post-grouping: London, Midland and Scottish Railway

Key dates
- 1849: Opened
- 1965: Closed
Location

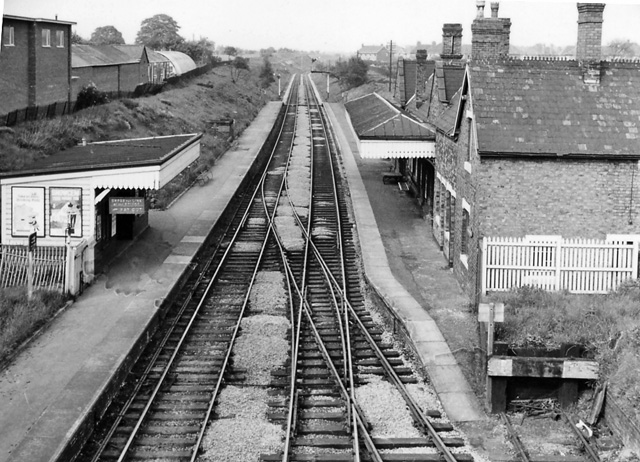
The station in 1962

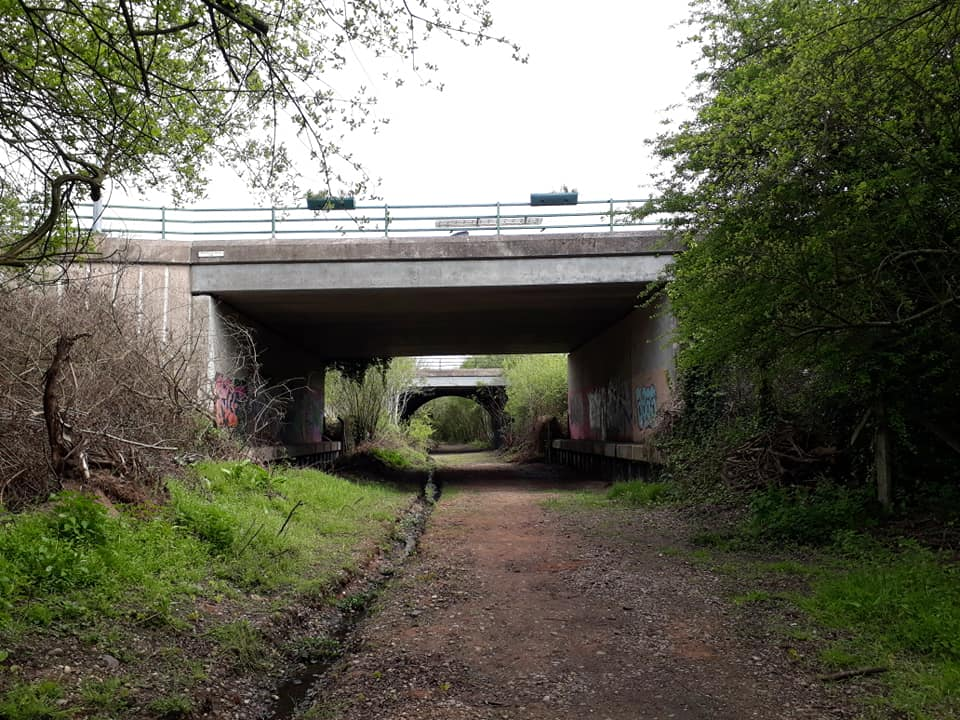
Site of Brownhills station

Brownhills railway station is a disused railway station that served the town of Brownhills and the village of Clayhanger in the Metropolitan Borough of Walsall, West Midlands. It was on the South Staffordshire Line between Walsall and Lichfield.

== History ==
It was opened in 1849. The station was built and served by the South Staffordshire Railway, which later became the London, Midland and Scottish Railway (through amalgamation of the London and North Western Railway).

Unlike Wednesbury and Great Bridge further up the line, this station was never assigned another name when a second station was opened by the Midland Railway.

It closed as part of the Beeching Axe in January 1965. Goods trains continued to pass through the site until March 1984, when the line was completely closed. It is preserved in case the railway line between Walsall and Lichfield reopens.

== Station site today ==
The trackbed is now a leisure greenway from Walsall to Brownhills. Traces of the former station can still be seen and some track remains down north of Brownhills near Anglesey Sidings.

Preceding station	Disused railways	Following station
Hammerwich	South Staffordshire Railway; Later LNWR, then LMS, finally BR; South Staffs Line (1849-1965)	Pelsall
