= Brownhills =

Town in West Midlands, England

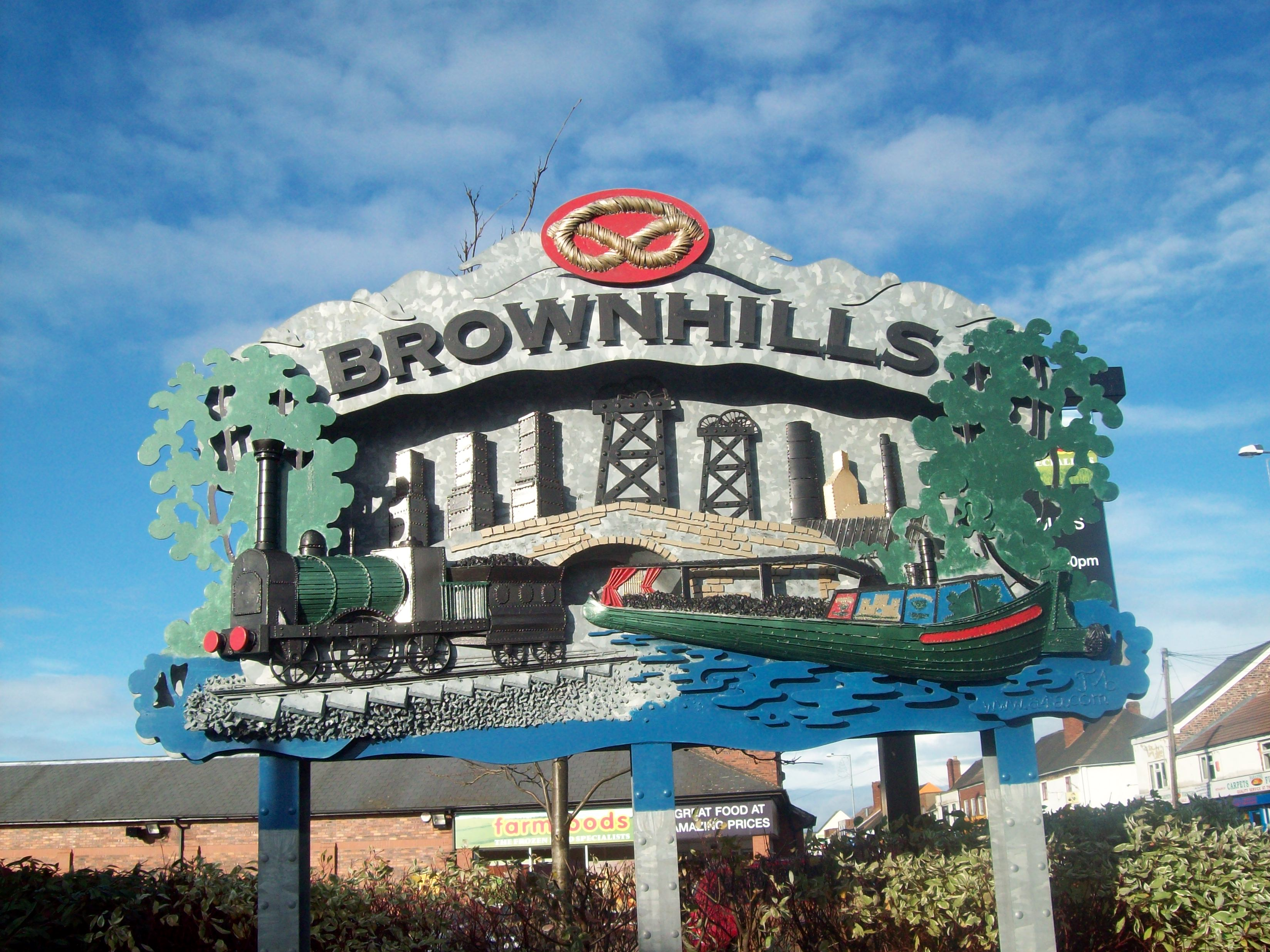
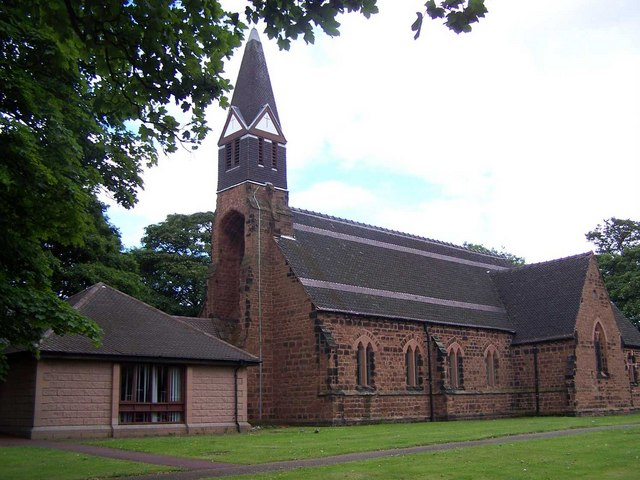
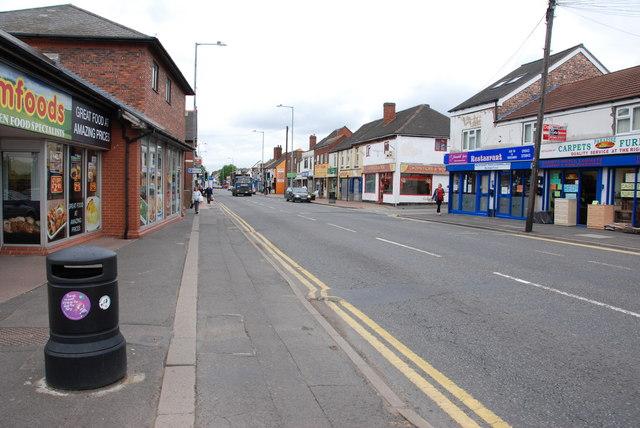
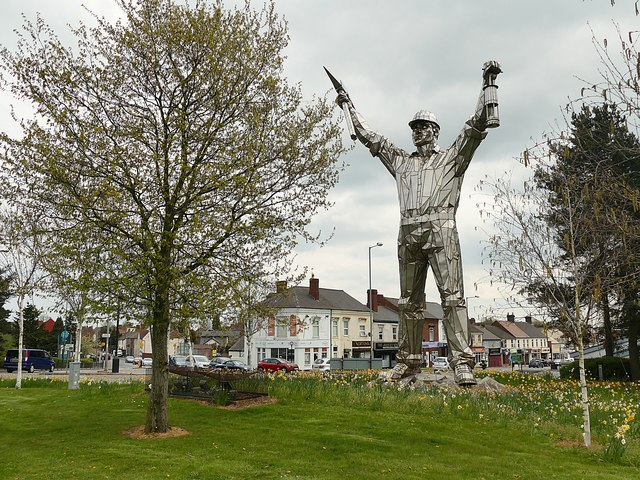
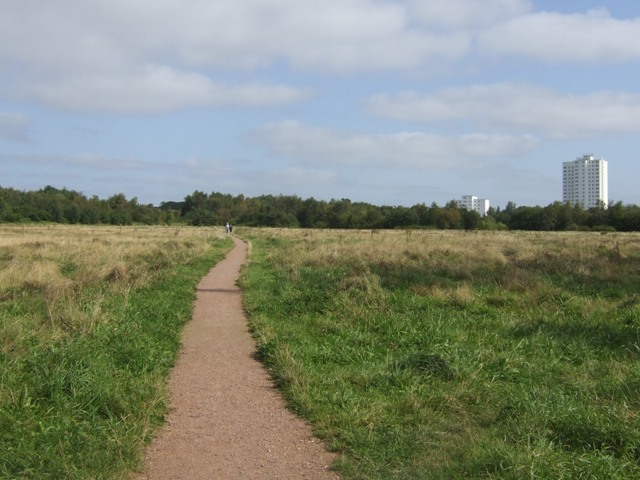
- Clockwise from top: Brownhills Sign, High Street, Clayhanger Common with High Rise Flat, Jigger Miner Statue & St James Church

- Location within the West Midlands
- Population: 13,441 (2021 Census.Ward)
- OS grid reference: SK045055
  - London: 128 mi (206 km) SE
- Metropolitan borough: Walsall
- Metropolitan county: West Midlands
- Region: West Midlands
- Country: England
- Sovereign state: United Kingdom
- Areas of the town: List: Brownhills West; Catshill; Clayhanger; Newtown; Ogley Hay; Sandhills; Shire Oak; Springhill; Stonnall (part); Walsall Wood (part)
- Post town: WALSALL
- Postcode district: WS8
- Dialling code: 01543
- Police: West Midlands
- Fire: West Midlands
- Ambulance: West Midlands
- UK Parliament: Aldridge-Brownhills

Brownhills is a historic market and industrial town in the Metropolitan Borough of Walsall of the West Midlands county, England. The town is located south of Cannock Chase and close to the large Chasewater reservoir, it is 6 miles (9.7 km) northeast of Walsall, a similar distance southwest of Lichfield and 13 miles (20.9 km) miles north-northwest of Birmingham. It is part of the Aldridge-Brownhills parliamentary constituency and neighbours the villages of Pelsall and Walsall Wood. It lies within the boundaries of the historic county of Staffordshire.

The town lies close to the route of the ancient Watling Street, and although there is no record of its existence before the 17th century, Ogley Hay – a district of the town today – is recorded as a settlement in the Domesday Book. Brownhills quickly grew around the coal-mining industry, especially after the town became linked to the canal and railway networks in the mid-19th century. By the end of the century, Brownhills had grown from a hamlet of only 300 inhabitants to a town of more than 13,000, of whom the vast majority were employed in the coal industry. Mining remained the town's principal industry until the 1950s; the subsequent closure of the pits led to a severe economic decline that has continued until now. The local authority instituted a regeneration programme in 2007, which was hoped would revive the town's fortunes, but there has been little subsequent development.

== History ==
Brownhills is on the ancient Watling Street and there is evidence of early settlement in the area, including an ancient burial mound and a guard post believed to date from Roman times and later dubbed Knaves Castle. The name Brownhills, however, is not recorded before the 17th century. The most popular suggestion for the origin of the name is that it refers to the early mining spoil heaps which dotted the area.

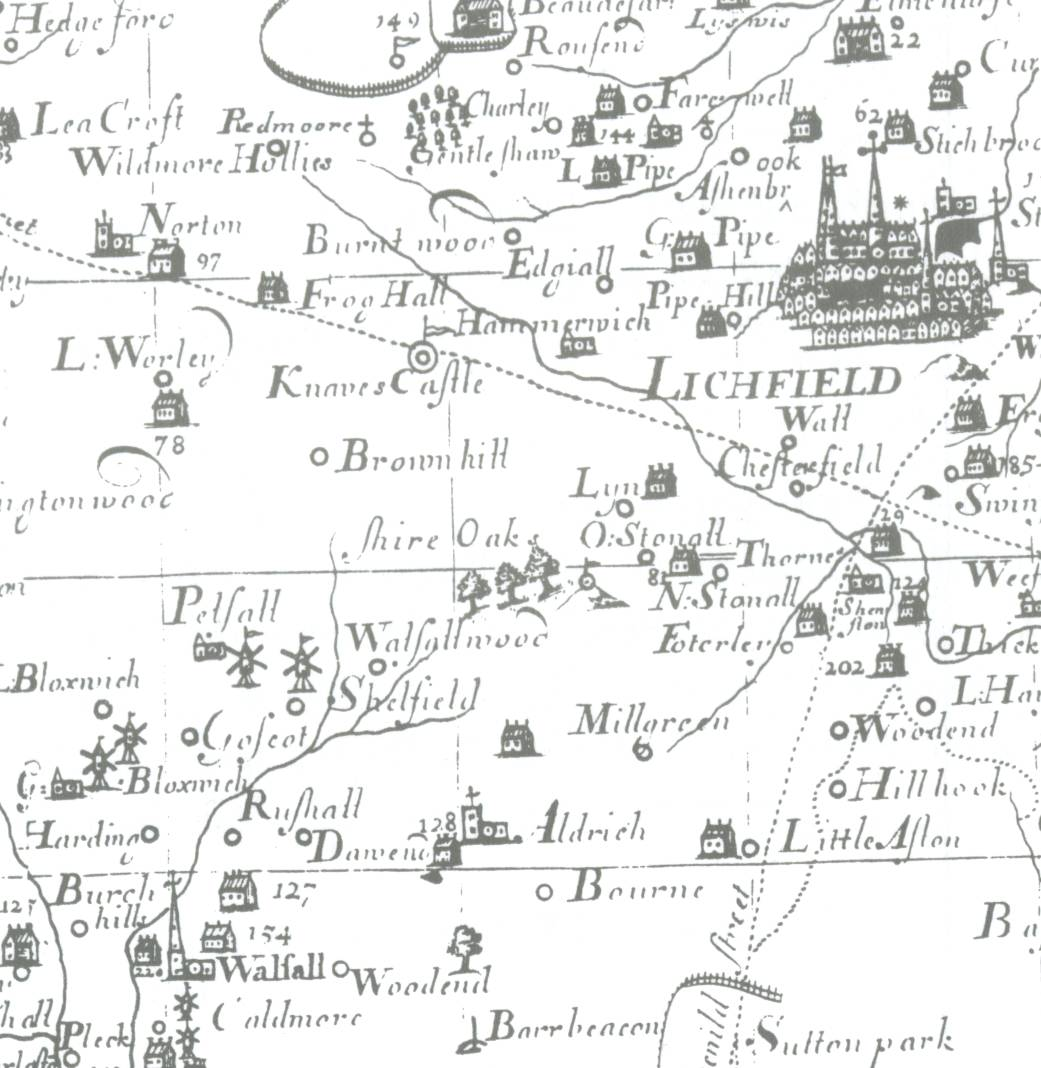
Robert Plot's 1680 map of Staffordshire shows "Brownhill".

The settlement is first recorded (as "Brownhill") on Robert Plot's 1680 map of Staffordshire, at which time it was a hamlet within the manor of Ogley Hay, which in turn was part of the parish of Norton Canes. Ogley Hay itself had existed since at least the 11th century and is mentioned in the Domesday Book, although the 1801 census lists it as having a population of only 8 people. Beyond Ogley Hay lay Catshill, another hamlet which pre-dated Brownhills and which lay within the parish of Shenstone.

During the 17th century, shallow mine workings began to develop in the area, and in 1759 a turnpike was erected in the Catshill area. A local legend claims that Dick Turpin once vaulted the barricade on his horse to avoid paying the toll, although this is demonstrably false as Turpin was executed in 1739, twenty years before the turnpike's construction. In 1794 Brownhills (now in the plural) was included in a list of local settlements mentioned in an Act of Parliament concerning canals in Staffordshire, and three years later the Wyrley & Essington Canal, nicknamed the "Curly Wyrley" by the locals due to its winding course, was opened. In 1799 Norton Pool, later to be renamed Chasewater, was created to serve as a reservoir for the canals.

Early in the 19th century, a horse-drawn tram system connected the mines to the wharves on the canal. In response to the growing population of the area open land in Ogley Hay, up until then merely heathland was enclosed and converted to farmland in 1838, the same year in which the area was first declared a parish, although no church was built for another 13 years. Charles Foster Cotterill, a former mayor of Walsall who had purchased the manor of Ogley Hay in 1836 upon the death of former lord Phineas Hussey, saw the potential of the area and sold off large tracts of his land for private farming and the construction of a flour mill and a foundry. The remaining land of the former manor was progressively sold off through a series of indentures of questionable legality until 1846 when Cotterill sold the last 135 acres (0.55 km^{2}) and moved to London.

The South Staffordshire Railway reached Brownhills in 1850 and led to a huge expansion of the local mining operation and with it a population explosion in the area, with the population increasing from 305 in 1801 to over 13,000 in 1891. In 1858 a branch line was constructed through the heart of what was then the hamlet of Brownhills, which led to a migration of the population eastwards, leading to the formation of mining slums in the Ogley Hay area. Eventually, a new town centre developed, complete with library and theatre. This led to the gradual amalgamation of Brownhills, Ogley Hay, and Catshill into one town.

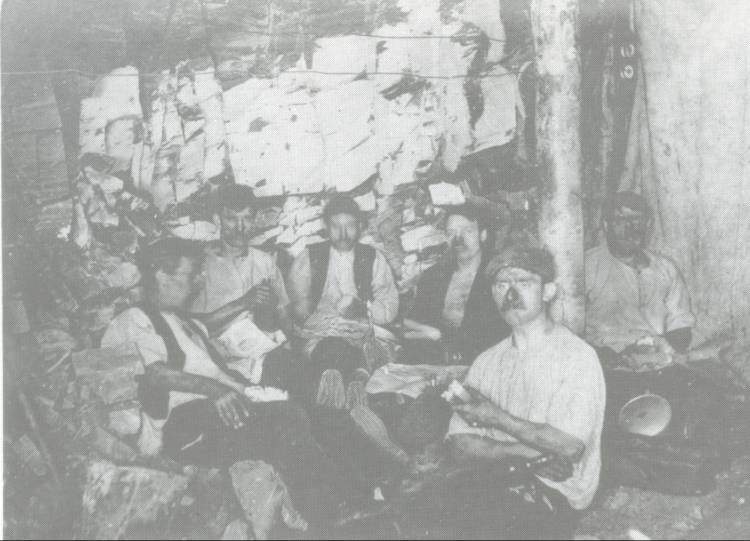
Brownhills miners depicted on a picture postcard from 1904

Mining was to remain the principal industry of Brownhills until the last pit closed in the 1950s. During the 18th and 19th centuries the area known as Coppice Side was the hub of the mining industry, and the census of 1841 showed that over 80% of the population of the area which makes up modern Brownhills lived and worked there, with up to ten pits active in the area at any one time. As in other mining areas, several men lost their lives in the Brownhills pits. Seven miners, including a boy aged 11, died in an accident in 1861, and in October 1930 an explosion at the Grove Colliery killed fourteen miners, ten of them from Brownhills.

In 1877 the town of Brownhills was officially recognised for the first time after a new Act authorised the amalgamation of rural districts into larger local government areas. An order was issued on 29 September stating:

The Local Government Board have proposed to declare the Parish of Norton under Cannock, the Chapelry of Hammerwich, the Parish of Ogley Hay, and parts of the Parish of Shenstone and of the Township of Walsall Foreign to be a Local Government District under the name of the Brownhills District.

After the First World War, the Urban District Council, which was based at the Council House and had replaced the District Board in 1894, began a programme of urban improvement. Large areas of open farmland were purchased for the building of council houses, and a notorious slum area, Ogley Square, which had been declared unfit for human habitation, was demolished after a long legal dispute and the tenants rehoused. The final farmland within the boundaries of Brownhills was sold for redevelopment in 1952.

By the time of the Second World War the mines of Brownhills, being amongst the oldest in the area, were largely exhausted, and following the nationalisation of the mining industry the final pit on the Common was closed in the 1950s. Following the demise of the coalfield the town experienced a severe economic slump, with many high street shops closing down. A wave of new development in the 1960s and 1970s saw a new shopping precinct planned, which it was claimed would incorporate a cinema, bowling alley, hotel, and bus station and would completely revitalise the town. Despite the developers' grandiose claims, the project was not a success and ultimately consisted solely of shopping units, many of which stood empty for up to five years. There was little further development in the 1980s and 1990s, and the feeling of the local council is that the town centre needs improvement. In 2007, the council created a "Townscape Masterplan" for the redevelopment of the town, but more than a decade later the most problematic areas had seen little redevelopment.

== Governance ==
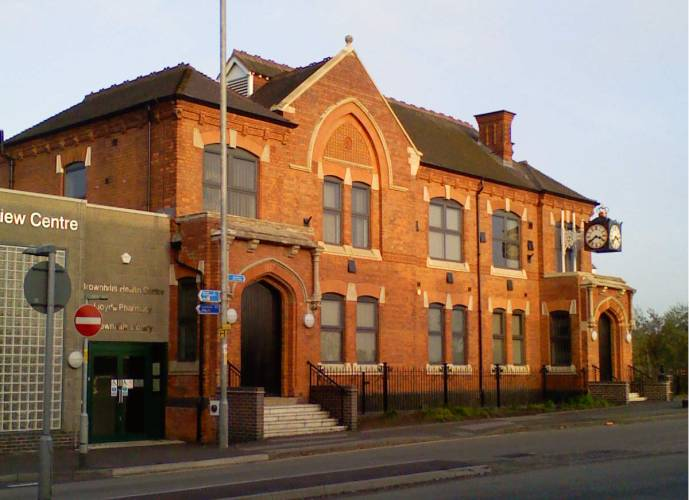
The Council House was originally the seat of Brownhills Urban District Council. Currently, it houses the town's health centre and library.

Brownhills is represented by two tiers of government, Walsall Borough Council ("local") and UK Parliament ("national").

The Brownhills District established in 1877 remained in existence until 1894 when it was superseded by Brownhills Urban District. In 1966 the Urban District merged with that of Aldridge to form the Aldridge-Brownhills Urban District, in accordance with a recommendation of the Local Government Commission for England. The district was amalgamated in 1974, under the Local Government Act 1972, into the newly formed Metropolitan Borough of Walsall, under whose jurisdiction the area remains to this day. As a result of this amalgamation Brownhills also became part of the West Midlands county, having previously been part of Staffordshire. Today Brownhills constitutes a ward within the Metropolitan Borough of Walsall and has three seats on the Borough Council. At the May 2026 local elections Brownhills elected three Reform UK councillors (Joshua Dixon, Pete Sutton and Aysha Nizamoglu).

Wendy Morton, representing the Conservative Party, has been the Member of Parliament for the constituency of Aldridge-Brownhills since 2015. Before the creation of the Aldridge-Brownhills seat in 1974, the town had been part of the Walsall North constituency since 1955, when it had been transferred from the now-defunct Cannock constituency.

Brownhills was part of the Walsall council counting area of the West Midlands European Parliament constituency, which elected seven MEPs to the European Parliament. In the 2019 election the Brexit Party gained 42.7% of the vote in this counting area, followed by Labour with 21.5%.

== Geography ==
Brownhills is located at 52°38′49.20″N 1°55′58.80″W on the edge of Cannock Chase and lies mostly at a height of approximately 150 metres (492 ft) above sea level, although there is a sharp incline to nearly 180 metres (590 ft) at the eastern end of the town. The highest point of Cannock Chase, standing at 244 metres (801 ft) above sea level, lies approximately 4 miles (6 km) from the town. Although a small river called Crane Brook flows slightly to the east of Brownhills, the only significant bodies of water in the area are human-made, namely the canal and the 3 km^{2} (1.2 sq mi) reservoir Chasewater, which lies to the north, between Brownhills and Cannock Chase. The reservoir was constructed in the 18th century and reshaped by reclamation schemes as recently as the 1970s.

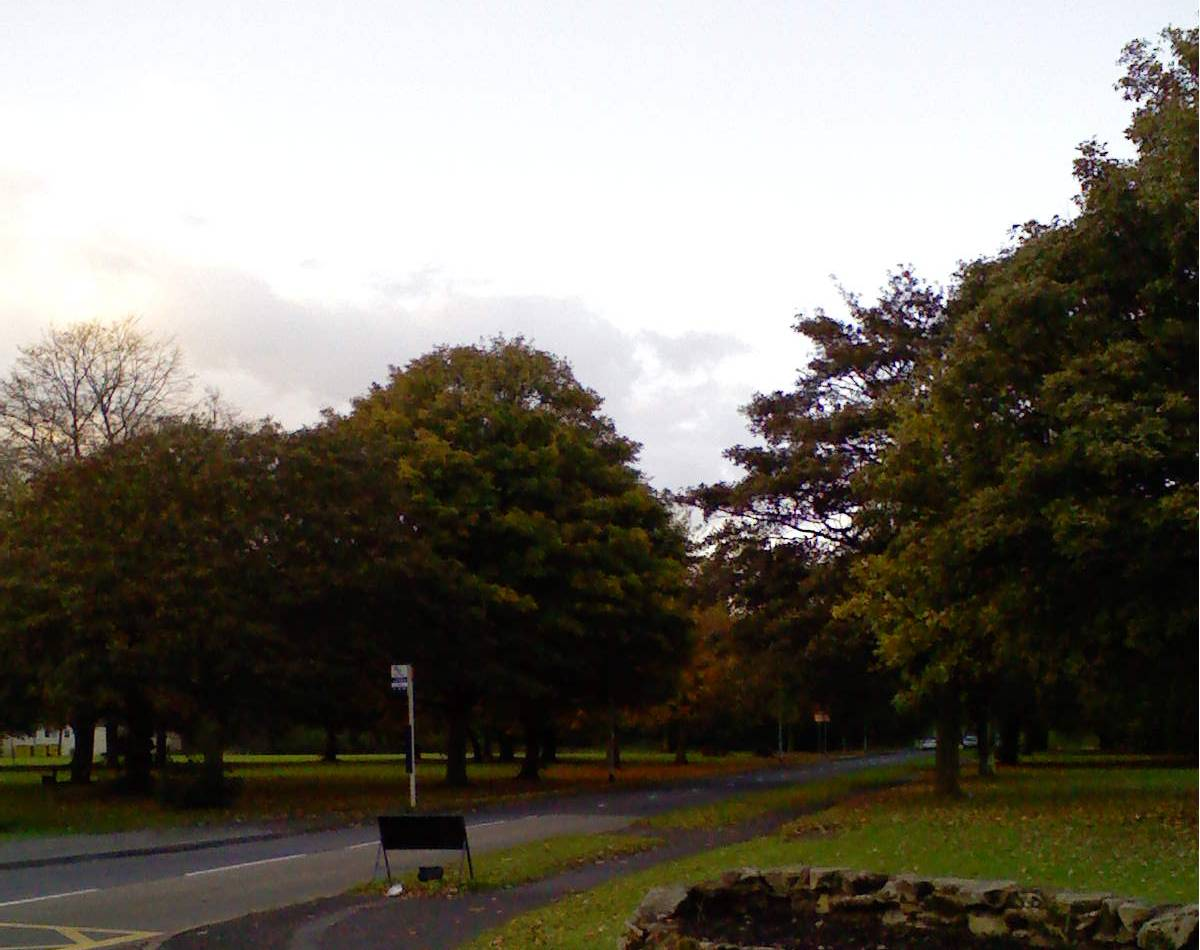
The road known as The Parade cuts across the easternmost part of Brownhills Common.

Immediately to the west of the town is Brownhills Common, a 100-acre (0.40 km^{2}) heathland which once formed part of Cannock Forest (also known as "Canke Wood"). Although the forest was felled in the 15th and 16th centuries, the spread of heather and the grazing of sheep led to the creation of a huge area of heathland. The area was affected by mine workings but has now returned to a more natural state, and lizards and dragonflies may be observed. The area now supports various habitat types, with the heathland mixing with marshy grassland, with scattered scrub and pools. In 1926, when ownership of the Common was transferred to the local Council, a large area of barren land at the eastern end, closest to the town, was landscaped, with new trees planted. Lying south of the Common, Birch Coppice is a large area of predominantly oak and birch woodland, which, although crossed by a now-dismantled railway line, mostly escaped the destruction caused to other wooded areas by mining and other industry.

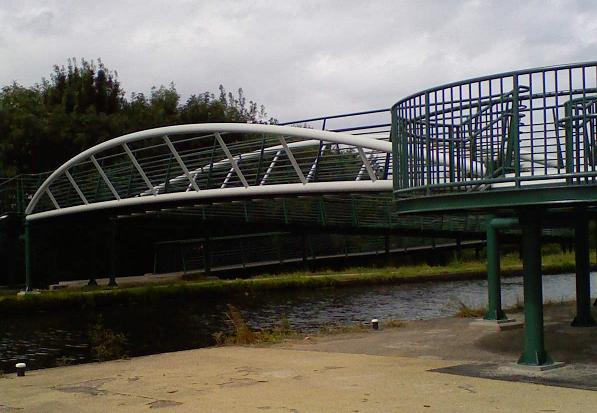
The new Brownhills bridge crosses the Wyrley and Essington Canal.

To the south, Brownhills is separated from the nearby village of Clayhanger by Clayhanger Common, which is designated a Site of Special Scientific Interest and considered "one of the best wetland sites in the county". In 2007, a new £445,000 bridge was erected across the canal at Brownhills, providing pedestrian, disabled and cycling access to the Common and to the village of Clayhanger beyond. To the east lies the village of Stonnall and a large area of green belt land.

The geology of Brownhills comprises mainly red clay marl overlying Triassic sandstone and deposits of coal. The town is on several fault lines, the main one being the Vigo Fault, a branch of the larger Eastern Boundary Fault, which runs from Birmingham to Rugeley. On the western side of the fault, in the area of Brownhills Common, the marl is over 1,000 feet (305 m) thinner than on the eastern side, bringing the coal seams significantly closer to the surface. The presence of the faults and the effects of mining mean that subsidence has been a major problem in the area for many years.

Since the 19th century, trade in Brownhills has been centred on the High Street. As the canal and Clayhanger Common lie immediately to the south of the High Street, the town's housing areas are mainly to the north and at the eastern and western ends of the town. In 2011, Brownhills had 5,173 residential dwellings, of which 49.4% were semi-detached houses. In late 2020 the average selling price of a domestic property in the town was £182,700, compared to £112,000 ten years earlier, a rise of 63%. Two housing associations, Walsall Housing Group (whg) and WATMOS Housing Co-operative (WATMOS), manage those properties formerly owned as council houses by Walsall Council.

In the West Midlands, the warmest time of the year is July and August, when maximum temperatures average around 21 °C (70 °F); the coolest months are January and February, when minimum temperatures average around 1 °C (39 °F). The area's average maximum and minimum temperatures are almost exactly in line with the national average. The average annual rainfall is about 676 millimetres (27 in), the wettest months being September to January. This is lower than the national average annual rainfall of 838 mm (33 inches).

== Demography ==
At the 2021 census, the Brownhills ward profile population was 13,441. Of the findings, the ethnicity and religious composition of the ward was:

Brownhills: Ethnicity: 2021 Census
Ethnic group	Population	%
White	12,517	93.1%
Asian or Asian British	337	2.5%
Mixed	276	2.1%
Black or Black British	225	1.7%
Other Ethnic Group	79	0.6%
Arab	4	0.1%
Total	13,441	100%

The religious composition of Brownhills ward at the 2021 Census was recorded as:

Brownhills: Religion: 2021 Census
Religious	Population	%
Christian	6,788	53.4%
Irreligious	5,516	43.4%
Muslim	156	1.2%
Sikh	127	1%
Other religion	61	0.5%
Hindu	47	0.4%
Buddhist	25	0.2%
Jewish	3	0.1%
Total	13,441	100%

== Economy ==
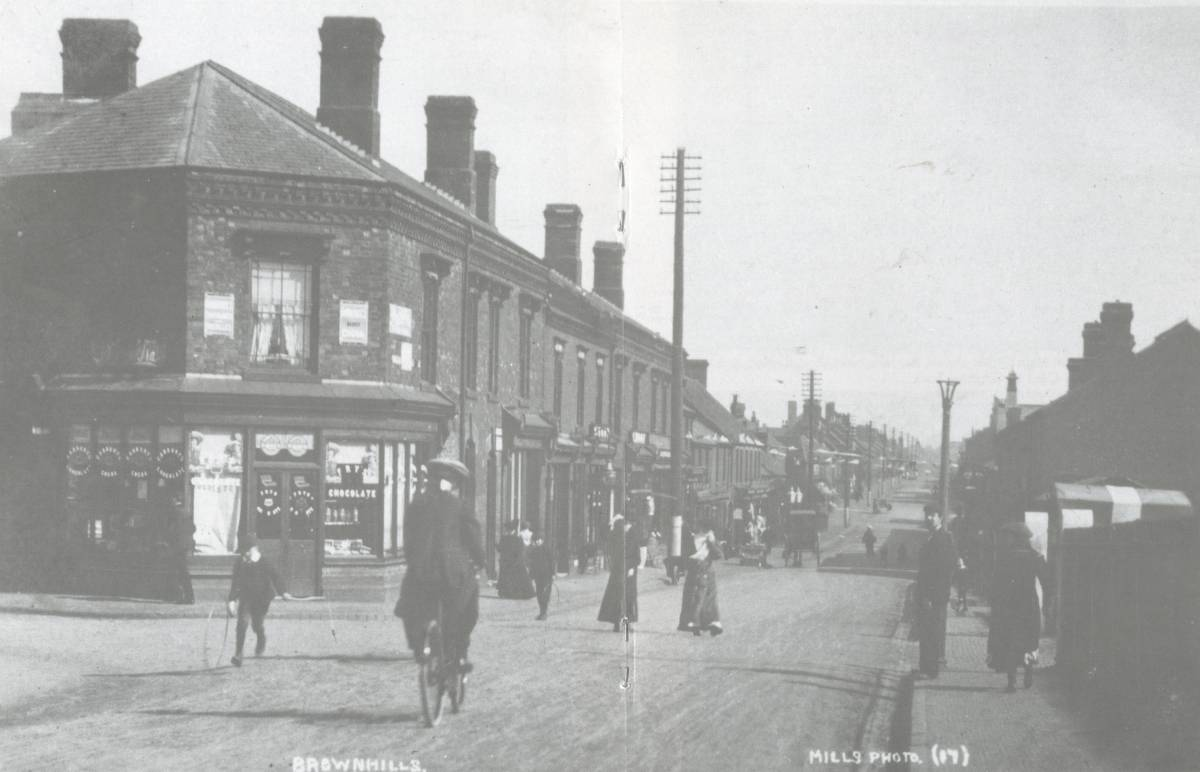
Brownhills High Street pictured in 1907

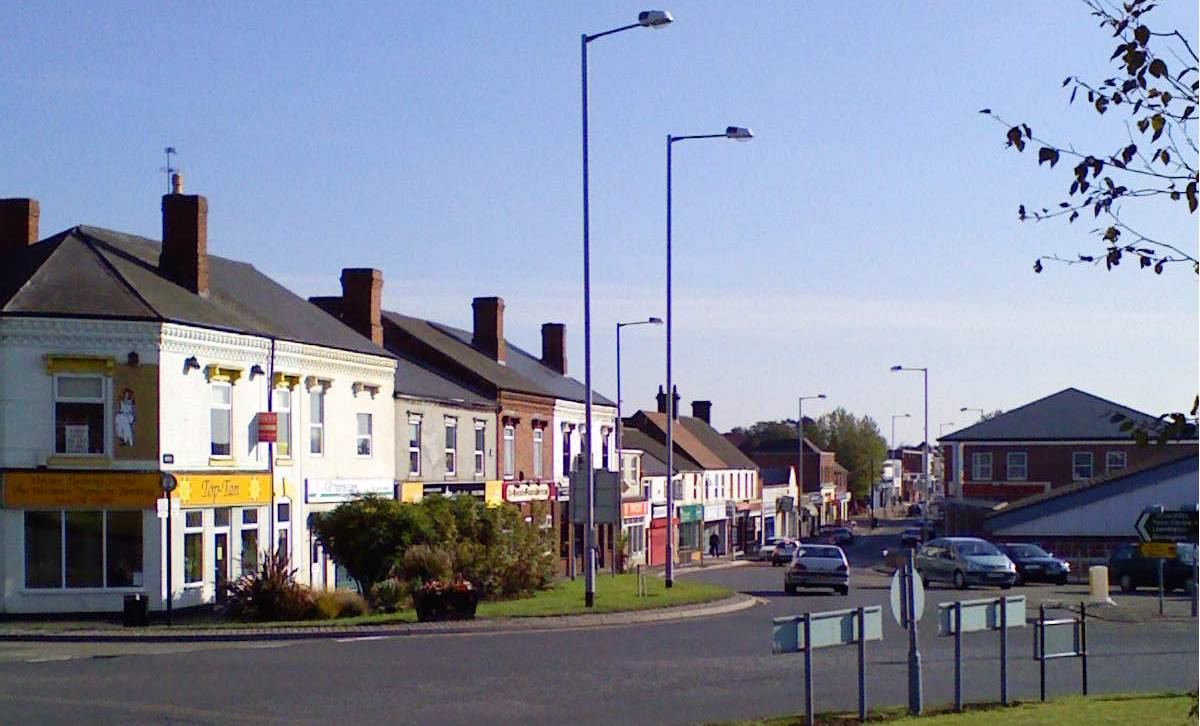
Brownhills High Street pictured in 2007

At the 2011 census, 5,769 people in Brownhills were employed, with the largest percentages in retail (19.8%) and manufacturing (15.8%). This represented a shift from a decade earlier, when manufacturing had been the largest sector, employing 28.5% of the workforce. In 2011, 2.7% of usual residents aged 16 to 74 were classified as long-term unemployed.

The decline of the mining industry in the 1950s caused a severe economic slump in Brownhills. In 2007, the local authority created a "Townscape Masterplan" for the regeneration of Brownhills, which involved increased leisure provision, the improvement of the town centre's shopping facilities, a new transport interchange incorporating Park and Ride facilities and cycle links to the town centre and the National Cycle Route, and the refurbishment of run-down properties. The plan involved the potential construction of a bypass to relieve the heavily congested High Street. Among the areas highlighted for redevelopment was the Ravens Court shopping precinct. After many years of legal wranglings, including the collapse of a plan to build a supermarket on the site, a planning application was submitted in 2017, but by late 2018 the precinct was still disused and a frequent target for anti-social behaviour.

The headquarters of the One Stop convenience store chain, a subsidiary of Tesco plc, is located in the town. The foundry company Castings plc is based on Lichfield Road. Brownhills was formerly home to the wirings manufacturer Electrium's last UK-based factory, but this has closed, with manufacturing shifted overseas and commercial staff moved to a new site in Cannock.

== Transport ==
A train passes through Brownhills in 1909.

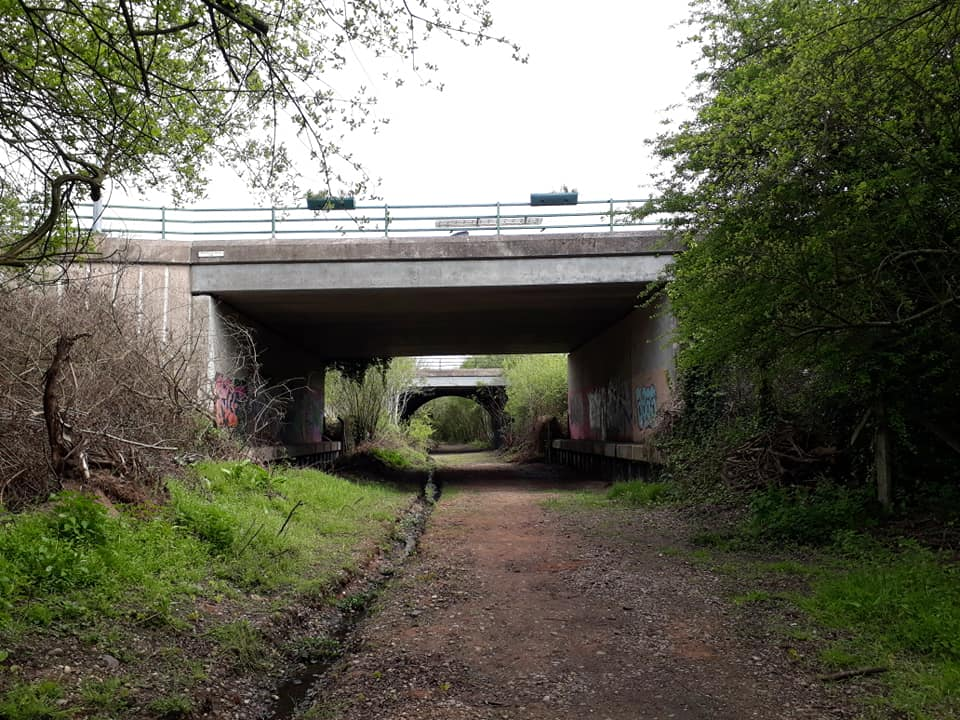
The site of Brownhills station in 2018

=== Roads and bus ===
Brownhills is served by the A5 and lies close to a junction of the M6 Toll motorway. West Midlands Bus services 936, 937, 937A connect the town with Kingstanding, Perry Barr and Birmingham. They also operate service 8 linking Brownhills with Walsall, Burntwood and Lichfield. Chaserider operates service 3 to Norton Canes and Cannock. Previously this was operated by Arriva and extended to Walsall vis the current service 8 route.

=== Railway ===
Brownhills formerly had two railway stations. The first, on the South Staffordshire Line (later part of the London, Midland and Scottish Railway), opened in 1849 but was closed as part of the Beeching Axe in 1965. The line remained open for freight until 1983, but the track was lifted in 1987. The other, on the Midland Railway, was open for passengers between 1884 and 1930 and for freight until 1960, when the track was lifted. Andy Street, the Mayor of the West Midlands, put forward a 20-year plan for the improvement of the region's transport infrastructure in 2020 which included the re-opening of a station in Brownhills.

=== Canals ===
The Birmingham Canal Navigations' Wyrley and Essington Canal passes through Brownhills and meets the Daw End Branch Canal at Catshill Junction. The Lichfield and Hatherton Canals Restoration Trust has been involved in restoring the Lichfield Canal since its formation in 1988 and, in 2003, created an aqueduct over the M6 Toll road near Brownhills.

== Education ==
The town's main secondary school is Brownhills Ormiston Academy (formerly Brownhills Sports College, Brownhills Community Technology College, Brownhills Community School and Brownhills Comprehensive), a mixed-gender school with approximately 1,000 pupils, which is part of the Ormiston Academies Trust. In 2019, the school's progress 8 benchmark score was ranked "below average".

Watling Street Primary School, situated on the A5 at the western end of town, has approximately 200 students between the ages of 3 and 11 as of 2021. In 2019, 77% of its Key Stage 2 pupils were deemed to have met the expected standard. There are four other primary schools in the town: St James' Primary School, St Bernadette's Catholic Primary School, Brownhills West Primary School, Millfield Primary School and one in Clayhanger, Holy Trinity Church of England Primary School.

== Religious sites ==
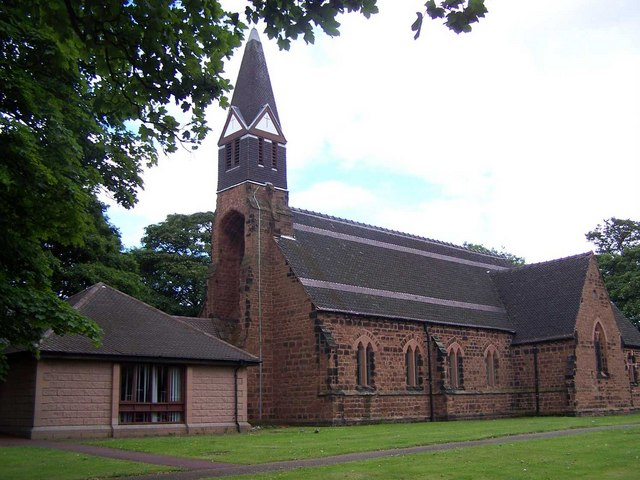
St James

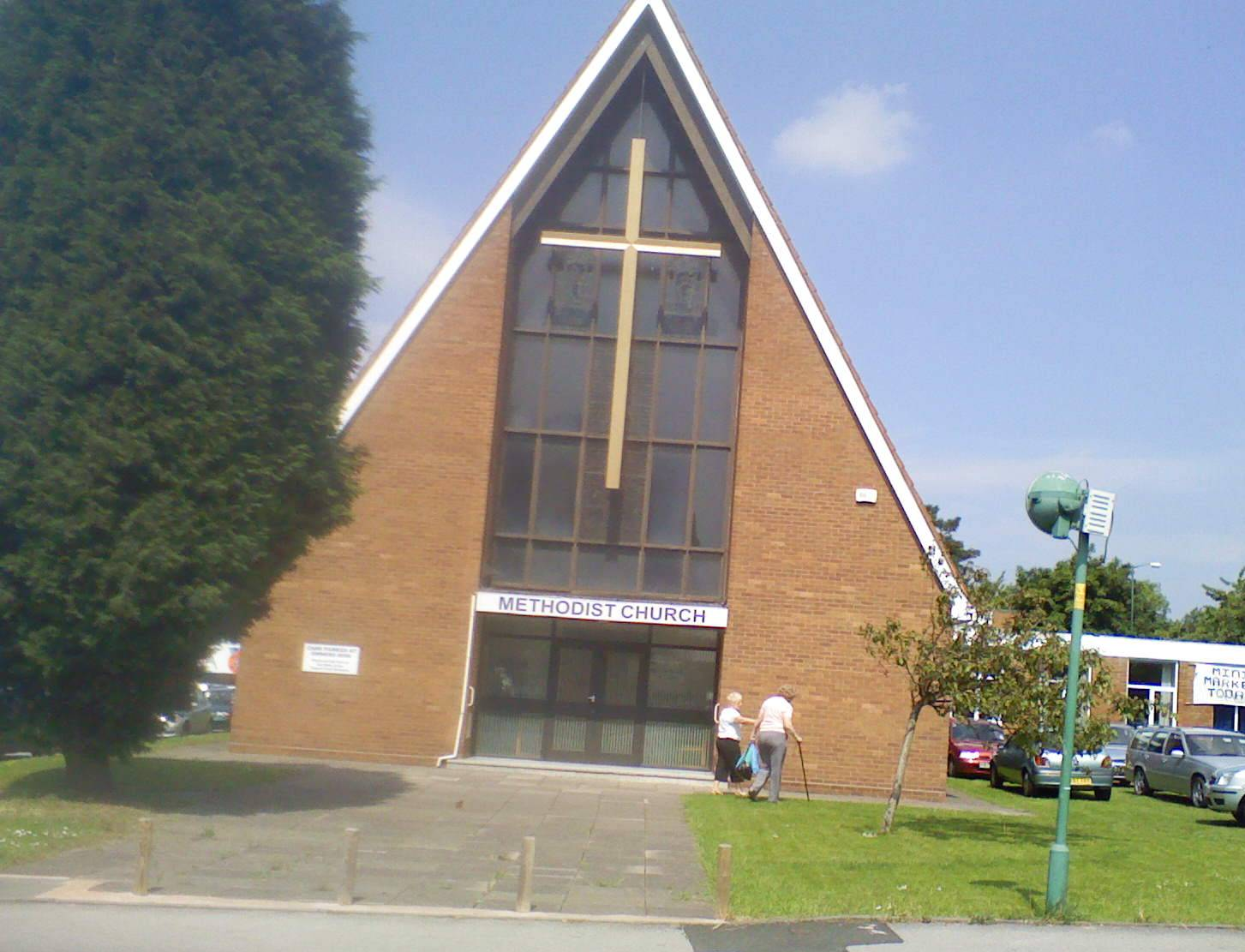
The Methodist Church

Brownhills has a Church of England church (St James), a Roman Catholic church (St Bernadette), two Methodist churches (including one in Clayhanger), two Spiritualist Churches, and a Pentecostal church. Brownhills has had strong links with the Methodist faith since the 19th century. The current Silver Street Methodist church was built in the 1960s when two other churches were compulsorily purchased and demolished due to their sites being identified as prime locations for additional town-centre car parking under a council redevelopment scheme.

== Culture ==
=== Attractions and landmarks ===
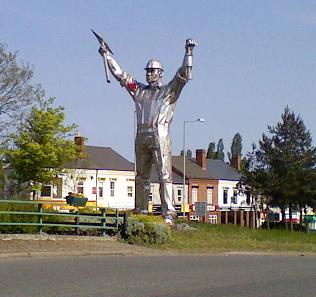
The Brownhills Miner statue by sculptor John McKenna ARBS

One of Brownhills' most prominent landmarks is a 46 feet (14 m) stainless steel sculpture of a coal miner, erected in May 2006 on a roundabout at one end of the High Street, where the A4124 Pelsall Road and High Street A452 cross. The colossal sculpture, by John McKenna ARBS, commemorates the town's mining tradition. A competition was organised to choose an official nickname for the statue. The winning name was Jigger after Jack "Jigger" Taylor who died when the roof of Walsall Wood pit collapsed in 1951. The town is also home to what is reputed to be the oldest fingerpost in the United Kingdom.

Chasewater in Staffordshire lies on the edge of Brownhills, with the area surrounding it, which is designated as a country park, officially falling within the Brownhills postal area. The reservoir supports a variety of activities including water-skiing, sailing, angling and bird watching. The Chasewater Railway operates a heritage rail service on the line of the former mineral railway around Chasewater between Brownhills and Chasetown, north of the former Brownhills Watling Street station. The railway's main station is designated Brownhills West.

On the opposite side of the A5, Brownhills Common, where a wide variety of birds can be observed, is a designated nature reserve, as is Shire Oak Park, approximately 0.9 miles (1.4 km) from the town centre. Holland Park, on the edge of the Common, has a skate park and multi-sports area, which were created as part of a £95,000 environmental regeneration project and opened in 2002.

=== Cultural events and venues ===
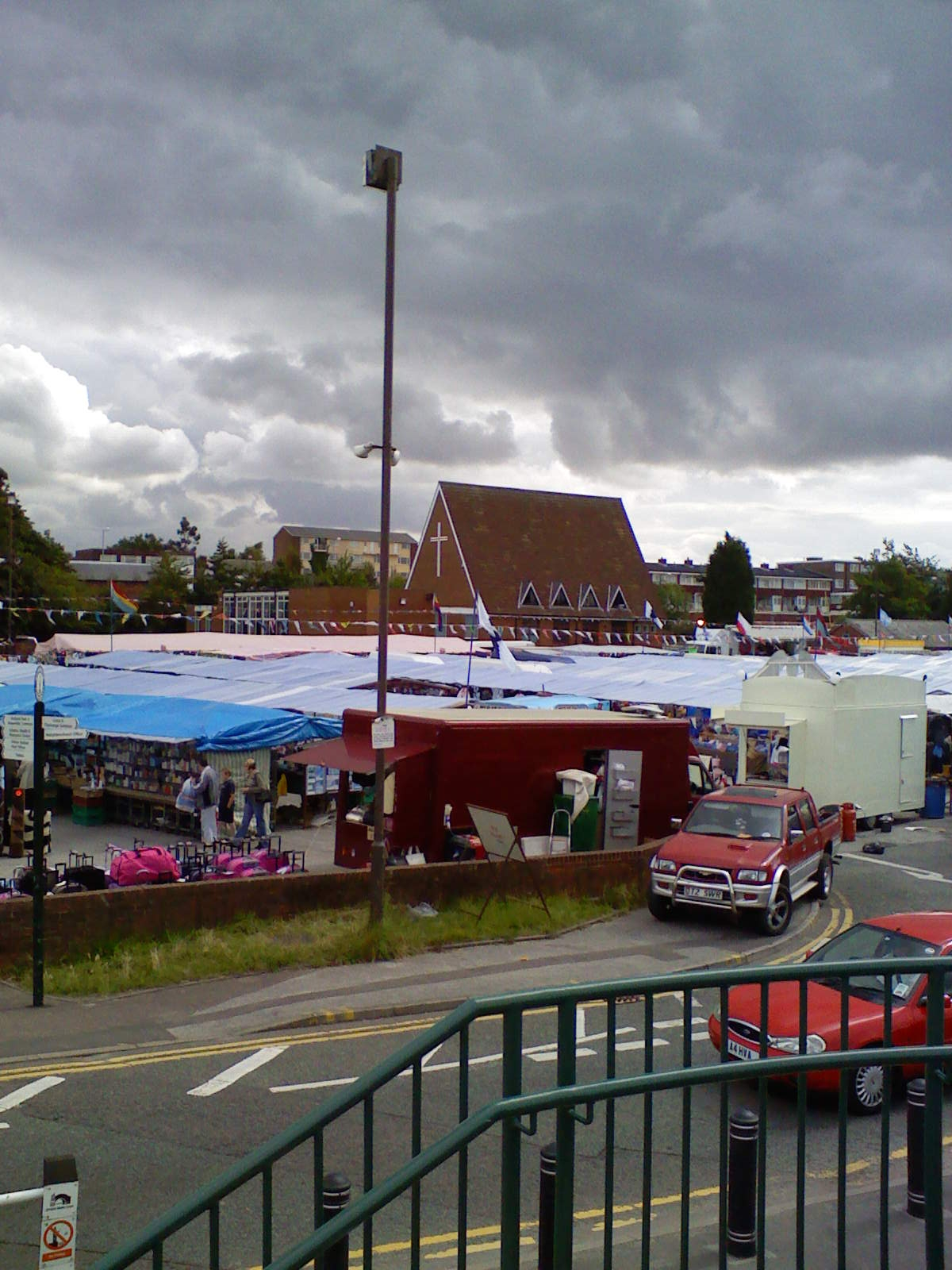
Brownhills market, with the Silver Street Methodist church visible beyond

One of the major concerns of the local council in 2007 was that the town was "particularly lacking in leisure provision". At one time the town had two cinemas, but the last of these closed in the 1960s and a plan to build a new one never came to fruition. Although the town's theatre had closed down many years prior, the Brownhills Academy's theatre has staged productions by local groups such as the Aldridge Musical Comedy Society and the Walsall Gilbert and Sullivan Society.

Brownhills holds an annual canal festival in June with stalls, entertainment and boat trips, and there is an active Community Association which organises a range of events and activities. The town had a weekly market for many years, but it closed down in 2010 due to lack of traders and the site was subsequently redeveloped for housing.

Brownhills has several public houses. Although some older ones, such as the Victorian-era Jolly Collier in Coppice Side, were demolished in the 1980s, several dating from the 19th century still stand comparatively unchanged, including the Shoulder of Mutton, which still bears windows etched with the emblem of the brewery which owned it in the 1850s. The Station Hotel in the High Street hosted concerts, including an appearance by Black Sabbath in 1968.

=== Sport ===
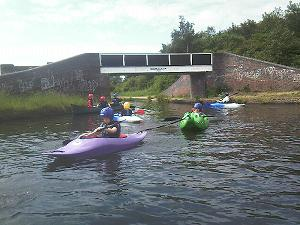
Canoeists on the canal near the bridge at Catshill Junction

Brownhills Community Colts Football Club fields teams in various age groups up to under-17. Brownhills does not have a Saturday men's football team; in the 1990s Brownhills Town F.C. competed in the Midland Football Combination but folded during the 2003–04 season.

The Brownhills Club hosted Aston Villa in the 1870s, losing 2–1 to their full-strength rivals. During the 1950s Ogley Hay F.C. were a strong local team, reaching the final of the Walsall Senior Cup on three occasions.

The Brownhills Canoe and Outdoor Centre opened in 2006, funded by British Waterways with the assistance of partners such as Sport England, the European Regional Development Fund and Walsall Council, and offers canoeing and kayaking lessons on the canal, close to the centre of town. Nearby Chasewater is a prominent watersports site, with the Watersports Centre offering a variety of water skiing facilities, and the sailing club providing year-round windsurfing and dinghy sailing.

=== Media ===
Brownhills has no dedicated local newspaper, but is covered by newspapers published in Wolverhampton and Walsall. The most popular paid-for local newspaper is the Express & Star. Free newspapers with significant circulation in the town include the Walsall Chronicle, Walsall Advertiser, and Walsall Observer. Similarly, the town has no dedicated local radio station but receives the stations broadcast from the Sutton Coldfield transmitting station.

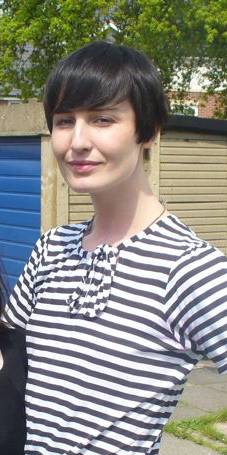
Erin O'Connor, 2008

== Notable people ==
- Erin O'Connor (born 1978), fashion model, grew up in Brownhills.

=== Sport ===
- Brothers George Dorsett (1881–1942) and Joe Dorsett (1888–1951) played for West Bromwich Albion and Manchester City.
- Cecil Poynton (1901–1983), footballer who played over 150 games, mainly for Tottenham Hotspur
- Dicky Dorsett (1919–1999) played over 250 times for Aston Villa and also for Wolverhampton Wanderers in the 1939 FA Cup Final.
- Roy Horobin (1935–2012), footballer who played over 250 games, mainly for Notts County
