= Clayhanger, West Midlands =

Village in West Midlands County, England

Coordinates: 52.624660°N 1.9300°W

Clayhanger
- Village
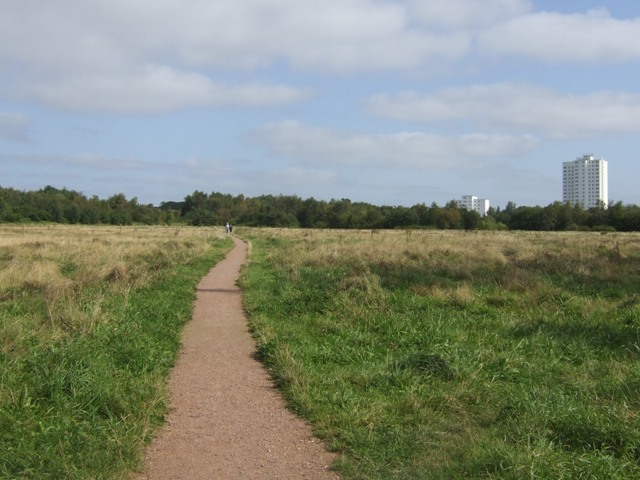
- Clayhanger Common

- Location within the West Midlands
- OS grid reference: SK042046
  - London: 127 mi (204 km) SE
- Metropolitan borough: Walsall
- Metropolitan county: West Midlands
- Region: West Midlands
- Country: England
- Sovereign state: United Kingdom
- Post town: WALSALL
- Postcode district: WS8, WS9
- Dialling code: 01543
- Police: West Midlands
- Fire: West Midlands
- Ambulance: West Midlands
- UK Parliament: Aldridge-Brownhills

Clayhanger is a village in the Metropolitan Borough of Walsall in the West Midlands, England. The village is situated between Pelsall, Walsall Wood and Brownhills. The village has only one road running through it from Brownhills to Walsall Wood. The village is predominantly residential.

== History ==
Clayhanger was first mentioned by the Earl of Stafford in 1391, it was a scattered hamlet until the time of the industrial revolution when the coal mines and railways arrived in the area and as a result. Clayhanger grew in both population and size.

== Amenities ==
The village is served by a Co-op store and also has local amenities such as a butcher's, a fish and chip shop, a Chinese takeaway & mysteriously a bathroom fitter's showroom.

== Education ==
The village has a Church of England primary school called "Holy Trinity Church of England Primary School". The nearest high schools are in Brownhills, Walsall, Bloxwich and Aldridge.

== Churches ==
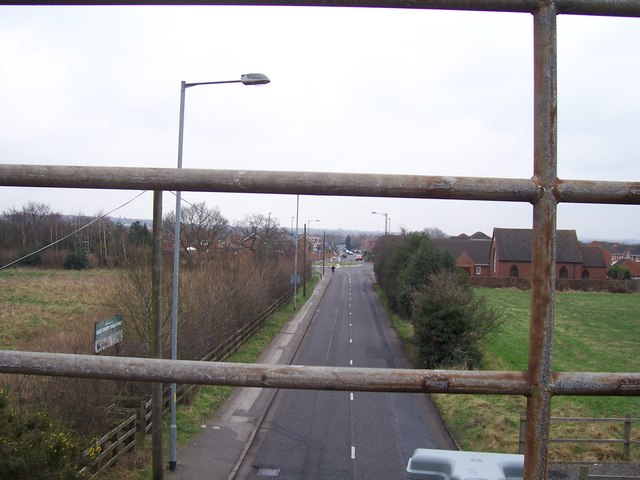
The Clayhanger Methodist Church on the right from the old railway bridge

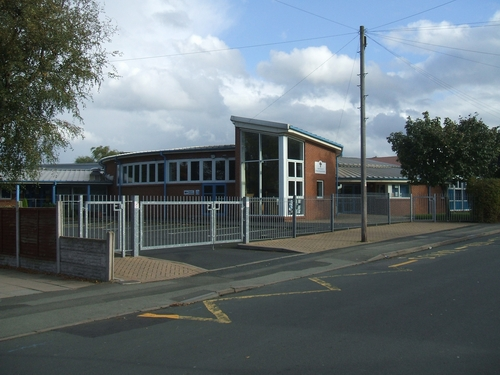
Clayhanger Holy Trinity Worship Centre and School

The village has two churches:

- Clayhanger Methodist Church - on Clayhanger Lane and is an active part of the wider Brownhills and Willenhall Methodist Circuit.
- Clayhanger Holy Trinity Worship Centre - on Church Street and is next to the primary school of the same name.

== Transport ==
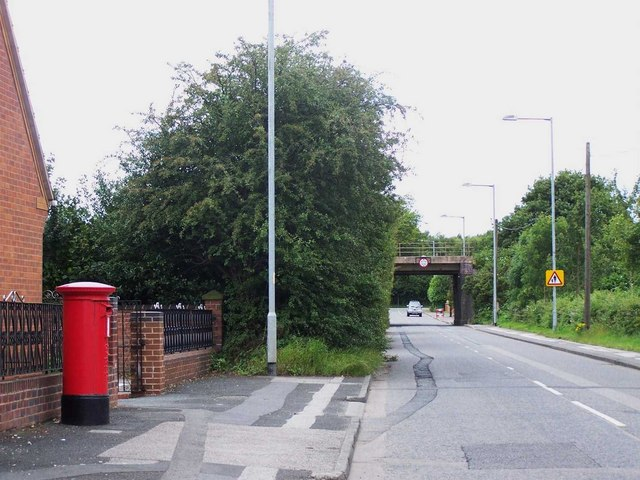
The former South Staffordshire Line crossing Clayhanger Lane (now in use as a greenway)

Clayhanger is served by bus number 8 between Walsall and Lichfield via Rushall, Pelsall, Brownhills and Burntwood. This runs through the centre of the village. Due to the low bridge, only single decker buses are used on this route. Previously, this route was operated by Arriva as service 3/3A but was curtailed to operate between Cannock and Brownhills only, replaced by the 8. The village was also served by the former South Staffordshire Line and Aldridge to Brownhills Branch line. The village was served by three railway stations at Brownhills, Walsall Wood and Pelsall. The village is also served by the Daw End Branch Canal which forms the border between itself and Walsall Wood/Brownhills as well as Clayhanger Common.

== Recreation ==
Clayhanger Common on the outskirts of the village is a large woodland park and woodland trust.
