= Aldridge-Brownhills Urban District =

Former urban district in Staffordshire

Coordinates: 52.60°N 1.92°W

Aldridge-Brownhills
- Population
  - 1971: 88,306
- History
  - Origin: The West Midlands Order, 1965
  - Created: 1966
  - Abolished: 1974
  - Succeeded by: Metropolitan Borough of Walsall
- Status: Urban district
- Government: Aldridge-Brownhills Urban District Council
  - HQ: Aldridge
  - Motto: Unite To Flourish

Aldridge-Brownhills was an urban district in Staffordshire, England, from 1966 to 1974.

The district was formed in accordance with a recommendation of the Local Government Commission for England on 1 April 1966. It was created by the amalgamation of the Aldridge and Brownhills urban districts, along with part of Lichfield Rural District, and small parts of the county boroughs of Birmingham and Walsall and the municipal borough of Sutton Coldfield.

The urban district had a short existence, as it was abolished in 1974. In that year the Local Government Act 1972 reorganised local administration throughout England and Wales, and Aldridge-Brownhills became part of the new Metropolitan Borough of Walsall.

There is still an Aldridge-Brownhills parliamentary constituency.
