= West Midlands (county) =

County of England

- Metropolitan and ceremonial county
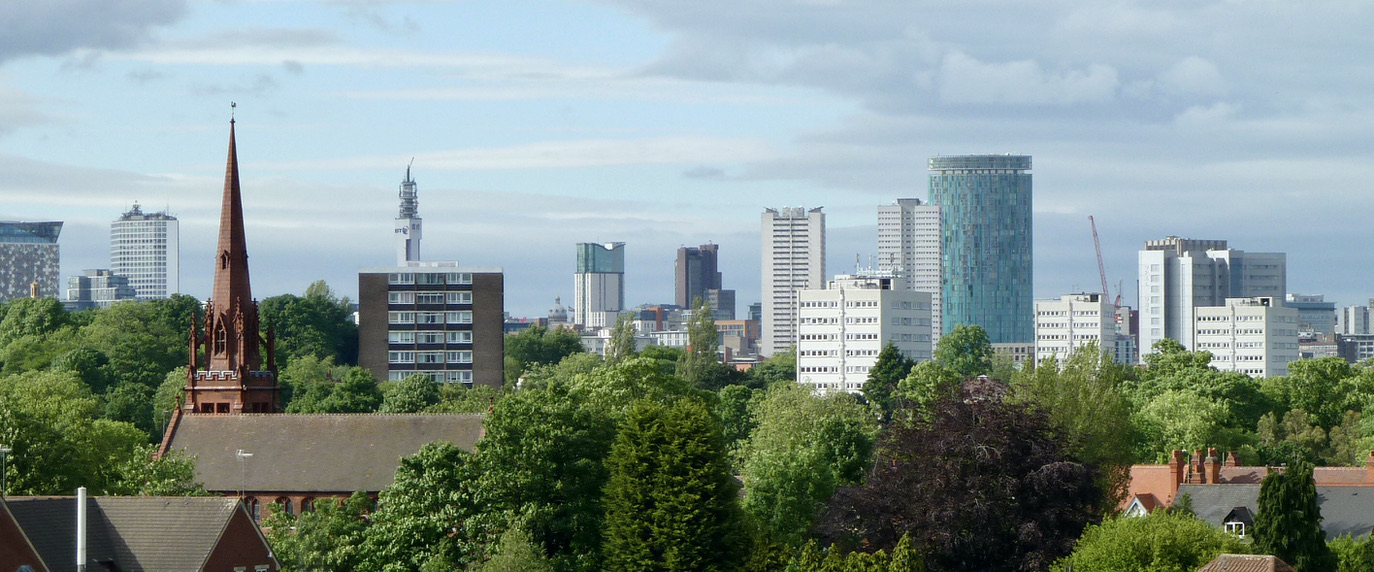
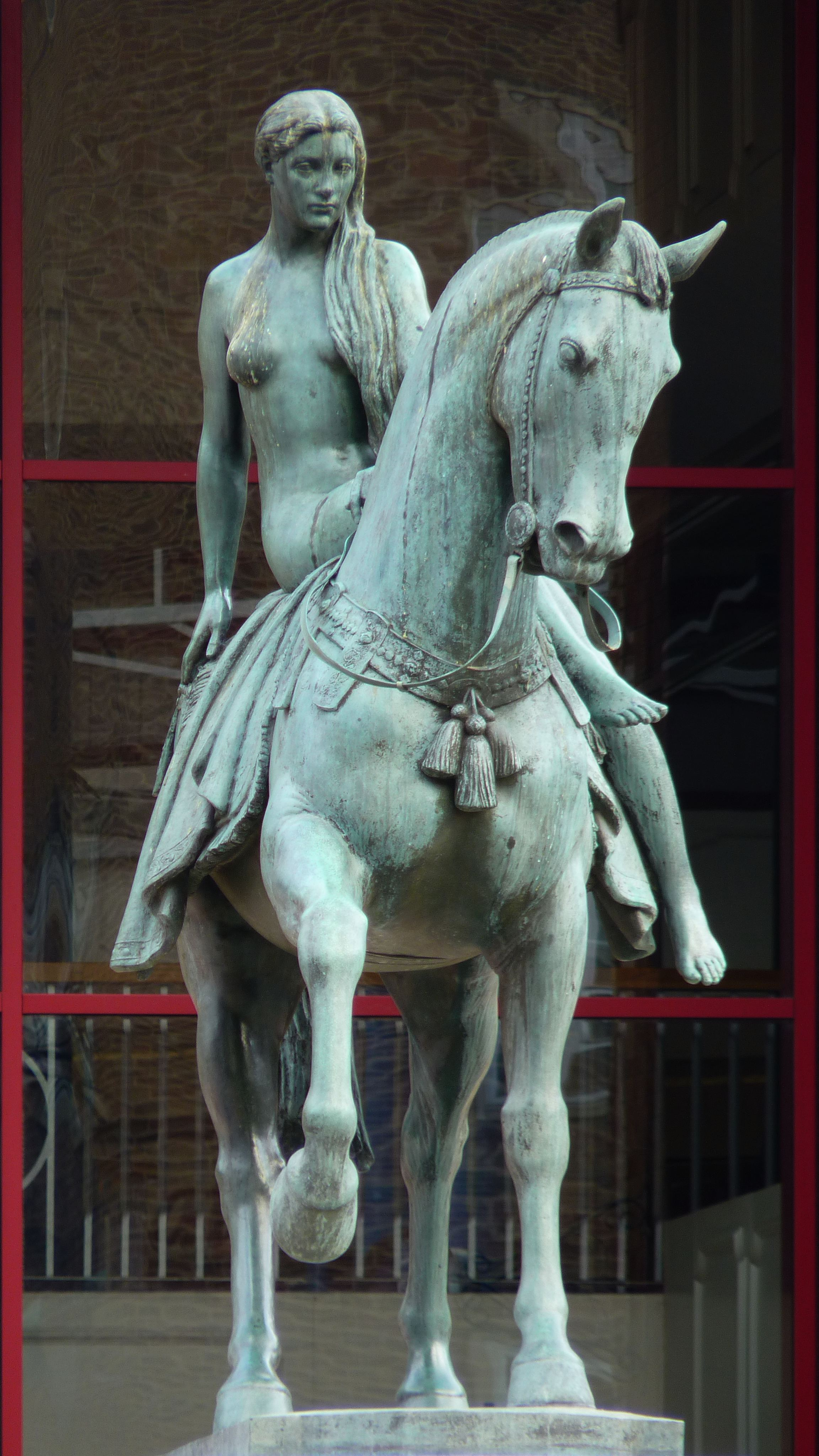
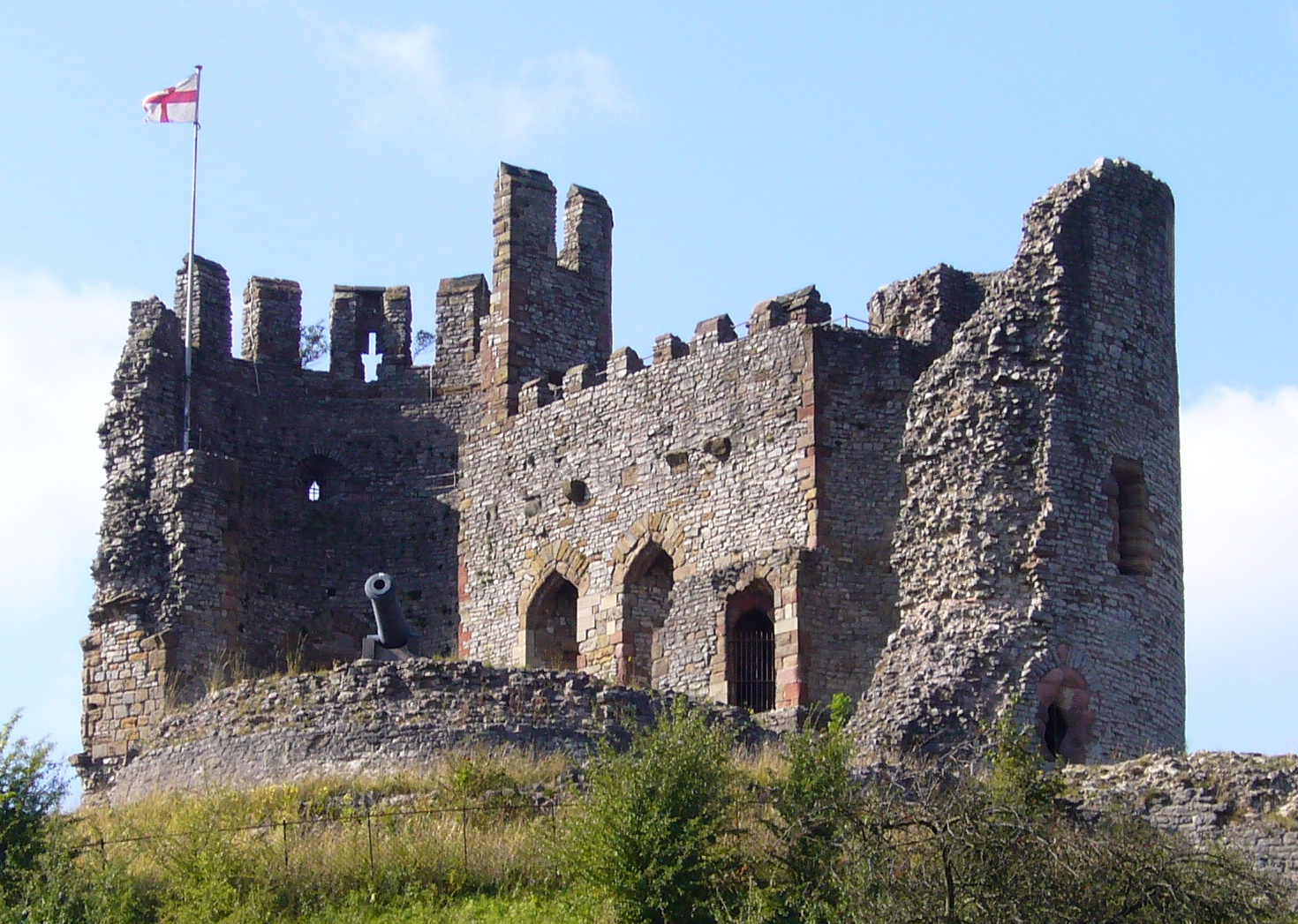
- Birmingham skyline, the Self Sacrifice (Lady Godiva) statue in Coventry, and Dudley Castle

- West Midlands within England
- Coordinates: 52.5°N 1.9°W
- Sovereign state: United Kingdom
- Constituent country: England
- Region: West Midlands
- Established: 1 April 1974
- Established by: Local Government Act 1972
- Time zone: UTC+0 (GMT)
  - Summer (DST): UTC+1 (BST)
- UK Parliament: 28 MPs
- Police: West Midlands Police
- Ceremonial county
- Lord Lieutenant: Dr Derrick Anderson
- High Sheriff: Carmen Anne Watson
- Area: 902 km^{2} (348 sq mi)
  - Rank: 42nd of 48
- Population (2024): 3,036,605
  - Rank: 2nd of 48
  - Density: 3,368/km^{2} (8,720/sq mi)
- Metropolitan county
- Government: West Midlands Combined Authority
- Mayor: Richard Parker (L)
- Admin HQ: Birmingham
- GSS code: E11000005 (county); E47000007 (city region)
- ITL: TLG3
- Website: wmca.org.uk
- Districts
- Districts of West Midlands; Metropolitan districts
- Districts: 1. Wolverhampton; 2. Dudley; 3. Walsall; 4. Sandwell; 5. Birmingham; 6. Solihull; 7. Coventry

West Midlands is a metropolitan and ceremonial county in the larger West Midlands region of England. It is bordered by Staffordshire to the north and west, Worcestershire to the south, and projects into Warwickshire to the east. The largest settlement is the city of Birmingham.

The county has an area of 902 km^{2} (348 sq mi) and is almost entirely urban, with an estimated population of 3,036,605 in 2024; this made it the 2nd most populous county in England after Greater London. Birmingham is in the centre of the county, with Solihull and the city of Coventry to the east and West Bromwich and the city of Wolverhampton to the west. Sutton Coldfield lies to the north. Most of the settlements in the centre and west of the county belong to the West Midlands conurbation, which is separated from Coventry by a rural area around the town of Balsall Common. For local government purposes the West Midlands comprises seven metropolitan boroughs: Birmingham, Coventry, Dudley, Sandwell, Solihull, Walsall, and Wolverhampton. Their councils collaborate through the West Midlands Combined Authority. The county was created in 1974 from parts Staffordshire, Warwickshire, and Worcestershire.

The west of the county encloses the valley of the River Tame and its tributaries; the highest point of the surrounding area is Turners Hill, at 271 metres (889 ft). West Midlands contains the Sutton Park Site of Special Scientific Interest, which has an area of 970 hectares (2,400 acres) and is one of the largest urban parks in Europe. The area between Solihull and Coventry is part of the Forest of Arden, and the rivers Sowe and Sherbourne flow through Coventry.

== Status ==
The metropolitan county exists in law, as a geographical frame of reference, and as a ceremonial county. As such it has a Lord Lieutenant and a High Sheriff. Between 1974 and 1986, the West Midlands County Council was the administrative body covering the county; this was abolished on 31 March 1986, and the constituent metropolitan boroughs effectively became unitary authorities. A new administrative body for the county (and some of the district surrounding it as Non-Constituent members), the West Midlands Combined Authority, was created in June 2016. Since May 2017, the authority has been headed by a directly elected Mayor of the West Midlands, a position currently held by Richard Parker of the Labour and Co-operative Parties. Other county-wide bodies include the West Midlands Police, the West Midlands Fire Service and Transport for West Midlands.

The county is sometimes described as the "West Midlands metropolitan area" or the "West Midlands conurbation" or "Greater Birmingham", although these have different, less clearly defined, boundaries. The main conurbation or urban area does not include Coventry, for example. The name "West Midlands" is also used for the much larger West Midlands region, which sometimes causes confusion. Geographically the county is on the eastern side of the region, the western side comprising Shropshire and Herefordshire and the southern side comprising Worcestershire and Warwickshire.

== History ==
Although the modern county has only existed since 1974, the settlements of the West Midlands have long been important centres of commerce and industry as well as developing a good local infrastructure. Coventry was one of England's most important cities during the Middle Ages, with its prosperity built upon wool and cloth manufacture. Birmingham and Wolverhampton have a tradition of industry dating back to the 16th century, when small metal-working industries developed. Birmingham was known for its manufacture of small arms, whereas Wolverhampton became a centre of lock manufacture and brass working. The coal and iron ore deposits of the Black Country area provided a ready source of raw materials. The area grew rapidly during the Industrial Revolution, and by the 20th century had grown into one large conurbation. Coventry was slower to develop, but by the early 20th century it had become an important centre of bicycle and car manufacture.

1966 saw a substantial reform in the local government of the area as the patchwork of county boroughs with municipal boroughs and urban district councils in between was replaced by a core of county boroughs covering a contiguous area, roughly as follows:

- Birmingham, which remained substantially unaltered
- Dudley, which absorbed all Brierley Hill, most of Coseley and Sedgley, and part of Amblecote, Tipton and Rowley Regis
- Solihull, which remained substantially unaltered
- Walsall, which absorbed all Darlaston, most of Willenhall, and parts of Wednesbury, Coseley, Wednesfield and Bilston
- Warley, which was created by amalgamating most of Smethwick, Oldbury and Rowley Regis, and parts of Dudley, Tipton, West Bromwich and Halesowen
- West Bromwich, which absorbed most of Wednesbury and Tipton, and parts of Bilston, Oldbury, Smethwick and Walsall
- Wolverhampton, which absorbed most of Bilston, Wednesfield and Tettenhall, and parts of Sedgley, Coseley and Willenhall

Near the area, three other towns remained separate (Halesowen, Stourbridge and Sutton Coldfield), while Aldridge and Brownhills joined to form a single unit, called Aldridge-Brownhills. In the same year, a single West Midlands Constabulary was formed for the Black Country county boroughs, whilst Birmingham retained its Birmingham City Police and Solihull continued being policed by the Warwickshire Constabulary. The West Midlands Passenger Transport Authority was established in 1968.

=== County creation ===
In 1974, the Local Government Act 1972 came into effect, creating the metropolitan county of West Midlands. This area was based on the seven county boroughs and the other non-county boroughs and urban districts around the fringe of the conurbation.

The new area consisted of seven new metropolitan boroughs, with Aldridge-Brownhills added to Walsall; Halesowen and Stourbridge to Dudley and Sutton Coldfield to Birmingham. A new borough of Sandwell was formed by the merger of West Bromwich and Warley. The actual designation of Warley itself was abolished and the three towns of Smethwick, Oldbury and Rowley Regis reinstated as component parts of Sandwell, although these areas formed the Warley postal district. Solihull took in much of the suburban fringe to the east of Birmingham, including the former villages of Chelmsley Wood and Castle Bromwich, also Birmingham Airport, and the area of countryside between Solihull and Coventry, whilst Coventry itself received only small changes and Wolverhampton was unaltered.

This led to (apart from in the east, with Coventry and the Meriden Gap) quite a tightly defined metropolitan border, excluding such places as Burntwood, Bromsgrove, Cannock, Kidderminster, Lichfield and Wombourne which had been considered for inclusion in the West Midlands metropolitan area by the Redcliffe-Maud Report. Conversely, the inclusion of Coventry (which was not considered for inclusion by said report), was controversial - it does not form part of the main urban area, and other similarly sized and formed cities such as nearby Leicester were admitted to their respective counties as non-metropolitan districts in 1974.

The 1974 reform created the West Midlands County Council that covered the entire area and dealt with strategic issues. A new West Midlands Police service was formed covering the entire area, with the West Midlands Constabulary and Birmingham City Police abolished, and also taking over responsibility from the county forces.

West Midlands was also established as a new ceremonial county, with the offices of Lord Lieutenant and High Sheriff created. Its constituent components had previously been, for ceremonial purposes, under the equivalent offices of Warwickshire (Birmingham CB, Coventry CB, Solihull CB, Sutton Coldfield MB and Meriden RD), Staffordshire (Wolverhampton CB, Walsall CB, West Bromwich CB, Dudley CB and Aldridge-Brownhills UD) and Worcestershire (Warley CB, Stourbridge MB and Halesowen MB).

post-1974		pre-1974			
Metropolitan county	Metropolitan borough	County boroughs	Non-county boroughs	Urban districts	Rural districts
West Midlands is an amalgamation of 14 former local government districts, including eight county boroughs.	Birmingham	Birmingham	Sutton Coldfield	–	–
West Midlands is an amalgamation of 14 former local government districts, including eight county boroughs.	Coventry	Coventry	–	–	Meriden (part)
West Midlands is an amalgamation of 14 former local government districts, including eight county boroughs.	Dudley	Dudley	Halesowen; Stourbridge	–	–
West Midlands is an amalgamation of 14 former local government districts, including eight county boroughs.	Sandwell	Warley; West Bromwich	–	–	–
West Midlands is an amalgamation of 14 former local government districts, including eight county boroughs.	Solihull	Solihull	–	–	Meriden (part); Stratford-on-Avon (part)
West Midlands is an amalgamation of 14 former local government districts, including eight county boroughs.	Walsall	Walsall	–	Aldridge-Brownhills	
West Midlands is an amalgamation of 14 former local government districts, including eight county boroughs.	Wolverhampton	Wolverhampton	–	–	–

=== West Midlands County Council ===
The arms of the West Midlands County Council, depicted here, became redundant with the abolition of the council in 1986 (though similar arms are used by the West Midlands Fire Service).

Between 1974 and 1986, the county had a two-tier system of local government, and the seven districts shared power with the West Midlands County Council. However, the Local Government Act 1985 abolished the metropolitan county councils, and the West Midlands County Council ceased to exist in 1986. Most of its functions were devolved to the West Midland boroughs, which effectively became unitary authorities, with responsibility for most local authority functions.

Following the abolition of the county council, some county-wide bodies continued to exist, which were administered by various joint-boards of the seven districts, among these were the West Midlands Police, the West Midlands Fire Service and the West Midlands Passenger Transport Executive.

=== Boundary changes ===
In 1994, the western/southern shores of Chasewater, plus the adjacent Jeffreys Swag, were transferred from the Metropolitan Borough of Walsall to the District of Lichfield, Staffordshire. Further boundary changes came into effect in 1995, when part of the Hereford and Worcester parish of Frankley (including the south-west part of Bartley Reservoir) was transferred to Birmingham and became part of the county.

=== West Midlands Combined Authority ===
On 17 June 2016, a new administrative body, the West Midlands Combined Authority was created for the county, under the Local Democracy, Economic Development and Construction Act 2009, which created several other combined authorities in England. The new body has powers over transport, economic development, skills and planning. A new directly elected position of Mayor of the West Midlands was created in 2017 to chair the new body. The first Mayoral election was held in May 2017, and the position was won by Andy Street of the Conservative Party.

== Geography ==
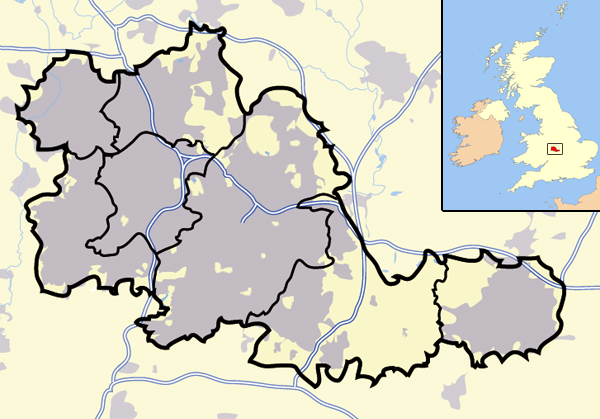
Map of West Midlands, showing urban areas in grey and metropolitan district boundaries

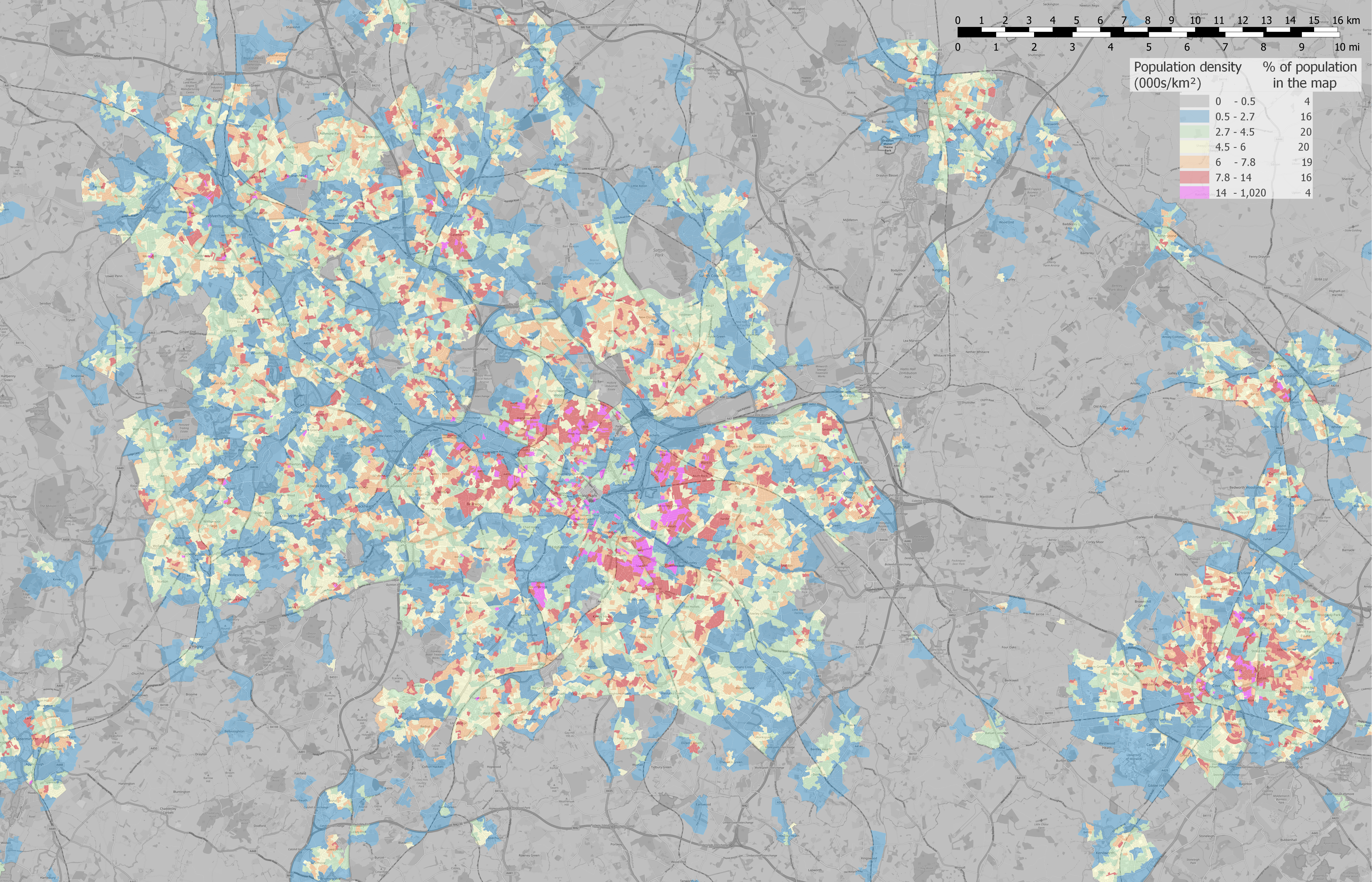
Population density map

The West Midlands is a landlocked county that borders the counties of Warwickshire to the east, Worcestershire to the south, and Staffordshire to the north and west.

The West Midlands County is one of the most heavily urbanised counties in the UK. Birmingham, Wolverhampton, the Black Country and Solihull together form the third most populous conurbation in the United Kingdom with a combined population of around 2.44 million. However, the West Midlands is not entirely urban; Coventry is separated from the West Midlands conurbation by a stretch of green belt land approximately 13 miles (21 km) across, known as the "Meriden Gap", which retains a strongly rural character. A smaller piece of green belt between Birmingham, Walsall and West Bromwich includes Barr Beacon and the Sandwell Valley.

The highest point in the West Midlands is Turners Hill, with an elevation of 271 m (889 ft). The hill is a Site of Special Scientific Interest. Barr Beacon is another hill in the West Midlands, located on the border of Birmingham and Walsall, with a height of 227 metres (745 ft).

There are 23 Sites of Special Scientific Interest in the county. One of these SSSIs is Sutton Park in Sutton Coldfield, which has an area of 970 hectares (2,400 acres). As a result, it is one of the largest urban parks in Europe, and the largest outside of a capital city in Europe. The park also has national nature reserve status.

There are numerous rivers that pass through the county, including the River Tame. The river basin is the most urbanised basin in the United Kingdom, with approximately 42% of the basin being urbanised. The River Tame is fed by the River Rea, River Anker, and the River Blythe, which in turn is fed by the River Cole. The River Sowe and River Sherbourne both flow through Coventry. The River Stour flows through the west of the West Midlands county.

== Metropolitan boroughs ==
Like other metropolitan counties, the West Midlands is divided into districts called metropolitan boroughs. There are seven boroughs in the West Midlands, six of which are named after the largest settlement in their administrative area. The West Midlands is unusual amongst the metropolitan counties in that three of its boroughs have city status; Coventry is a city by ancient prescriptive usage, Birmingham was granted city status in 1889, and Wolverhampton in 2000 as a "Millennium City".

Metropolitan borough	Administrative centre	Other settlements
City of Birmingham	Birmingham	Aston, Bournville, Edgbaston, Erdington, Great Barr, Hall Green, Handsworth, Harborne, Northfield, Quinton, Soho, Sutton Coldfield
City of Coventry	Coventry	Allesley, Binley, Keresley, Stoke, Tile Hill
Dudley	Dudley	Amblecote, Brierley Hill, Coseley, Cradley, Gornal, Halesowen, Kingswinford, Lye, Netherton, Sedgley, Stourbridge, Quarry Bank
Sandwell	Oldbury	Bearwood, Blackheath, Cradley Heath, Great Bridge, Old Hill, Rowley Regis, Smethwick, Tipton, Tividale, Wednesbury, West Bromwich
Solihull	Solihull	Balsall Common, Bickenhill, Castle Bromwich, Chelmsley Wood, Dorridge, Elmdon, Hampton in Arden, Kingshurst, Knowle, Marston Green, Meriden, Monkspath, Hockley Heath, Shirley
Walsall	Walsall	Aldridge, Birchills, Bloxwich, Brownhills, Darlaston, Leamore, Palfrey, Pelsall, Pheasey, Shelfield, Streetly, Willenhall
City of Wolverhampton	Wolverhampton	Bilston, Blakenhall, Bushbury, Compton, Ettingshall, Heath Town, Oxley, Penn, Tettenhall, Wednesfield

== Demography ==
Population density in the 2011 census in the West Midlands.

Ethnic demography of the West Midlands county from 1971 to 2021

Ethnic Group	Year													
Ethnic Group	1966 estimations		1971 estimations		1981 estimations		1991 census		2001 census		2011 census		2021 census	
Ethnic Group	Number	%	Number	%	Number	%	Number	%	Number	%	Number	%	Number	%
White: Total	–	–	2,580,903	93.2%	2,371,072	88.7%	2,237,135	85.1%	2,043,231	80%	1,919,138	70.1%	1,793,173	61.4%
White: British	–	–	–	–	–	–	–	–	1,956,156	76.5%	1,806,708	66%	1,630,823	55.9%
White: Irish	–	–	–	–	–	–	–	–	54,011	2.1%	39,183	1.4%	31,490	1.1%
White: Gypsy or Irish Traveller (Note: New category created for the 2011 census)	–	–	–	–	–	–	–	–			1,618		2417	
White: Roma	–	–	–	–	–	–	–	–			–	–	4246	
White: Other	–	–	–	–	–	–	–	–	33,064	1.3%	71,629	2.6%	124,197	4.3%
Asian or Asian British: Total	–	–	–	–	206,289	7.7%	276,162	10.5%	352,288	13.8%	514,981	18.8%	667,315	22.9%
Asian or Asian British: Indian	–	–	–	–	118,101	4.4%	148,320	5.6%	157,062	6.1%	185,271	6.8%	226,927	7.8%
Asian or Asian British: Pakistani	–	–	–	–	65,985	2.5%	93,426	3.6%	138,007	5.4%	200,545	7.3%	278,837	9.6%
Asian or Asian British: Bangladeshi	–	–	–	–	11,006	0.4%	19,131	0.7%	29,085	1.1%	48,727		72,168	2.5%
Asian or Asian British: Chinese (Note: In 2001, listed under the 'Chinese or other ethnic group' heading.)	–	–	–	–	4,543	0.2%	6,119	0.2%	10,548	0.4%	21,430		22,718	0.8%
Asian or Asian British: Other Asian	–	–	–	–	6,654		9,166		17,586		59,008		66,665	2.3%
Black or Black British: Total	–	–	–	–	80,412	3%	96,384	3.7%	95,234	3.7%	164,069	6%	236,047	8.1%
Black or Black British: African	–	–	–	–	3,602	0.1%	4,134	0.2%	10,000	0.4%	55,557	2%	126,041	4.3%
Black or Black British: Caribbean	–	–	–	–	63,597	2.4%	75,612	2.9%	76,386	3%	79,632	2.9%	81,732	2.8%
Black or Black British: Other Black	–	–	–	–	13,213		16,638	0.6%	8,848	0.3%	28,880		28,274	1%
Mixed: Total	–	–	–	–	–	–	–	–	54,757	2.1%	96,204	3.5%	121,685	4.2%
Mixed: White and Black Caribbean	–	–	–	–	–	–	–	–	31,525	1.2%	53,234	1.9%	59,903	2.1%
Mixed: White and Black African	–	–	–	–	–	–	–	–	2,446		6,053		9,735	
Mixed: White and Asian	–	–	–	–	–	–	–	–	12,641		21,964		28,872	
Mixed: Other Mixed	–	–	–	–	–	–	–	–	8,145		14,953		23,175	
Other: Total	–	–	–	–	15,327	0.5%	19,719	0.7%	10,082	0.4%	42,068	1.5%	101,435	3.5%
Other: Arab	–	–	–	–	–	–	–	–	–	–	16,029		28,083	1%
Other: Any other ethnic group	–	–	–	–	–	–	–	–	10,082	0.4%	26,039		73,352	2.5%
Ethnic minority: Total	102,850	–	188,306	6.8%	302,027	11.3%	392,265	14.9%	512,361	20%	817,322	29.9%	1,126,482	38.6%
Total	–	100%	2,769,209	100%	2,673,099	100%	2,629,400	100%	2,555,592	100%	2,736,460	100%	2,919,655	100%

Distribution of ethnic groups in the West Midlands according to the 2011 census.
White

White-British

White-Irish

White-Other

Asian

Asian-Indian

Asian-Pakistani

Asian-Bangladeshi

Asian-Chinese

Black

Black-African

Black-Caribbean

Other-Arab
Distribution of religions in the West Midlands according to the 2011 census.
Christianity

Islam

Sikhism

Hinduism

Buddhism

Judaism

Other religion

No religion

== Economy ==
In Central Birmingham

- The Insolvency Service's Intelligence and Enforcement Directorate.
- Stamp Duty Land Tax and stamp duty on shares
- National Debtline
- The Solicitors Regulation Authority
- H. Samuel, jewellers.
- J Hudson & Co the world's largest producer of whistles make Acme Whistles.
- Mobico Group and CrossCountry in transport.

Car manufacturers

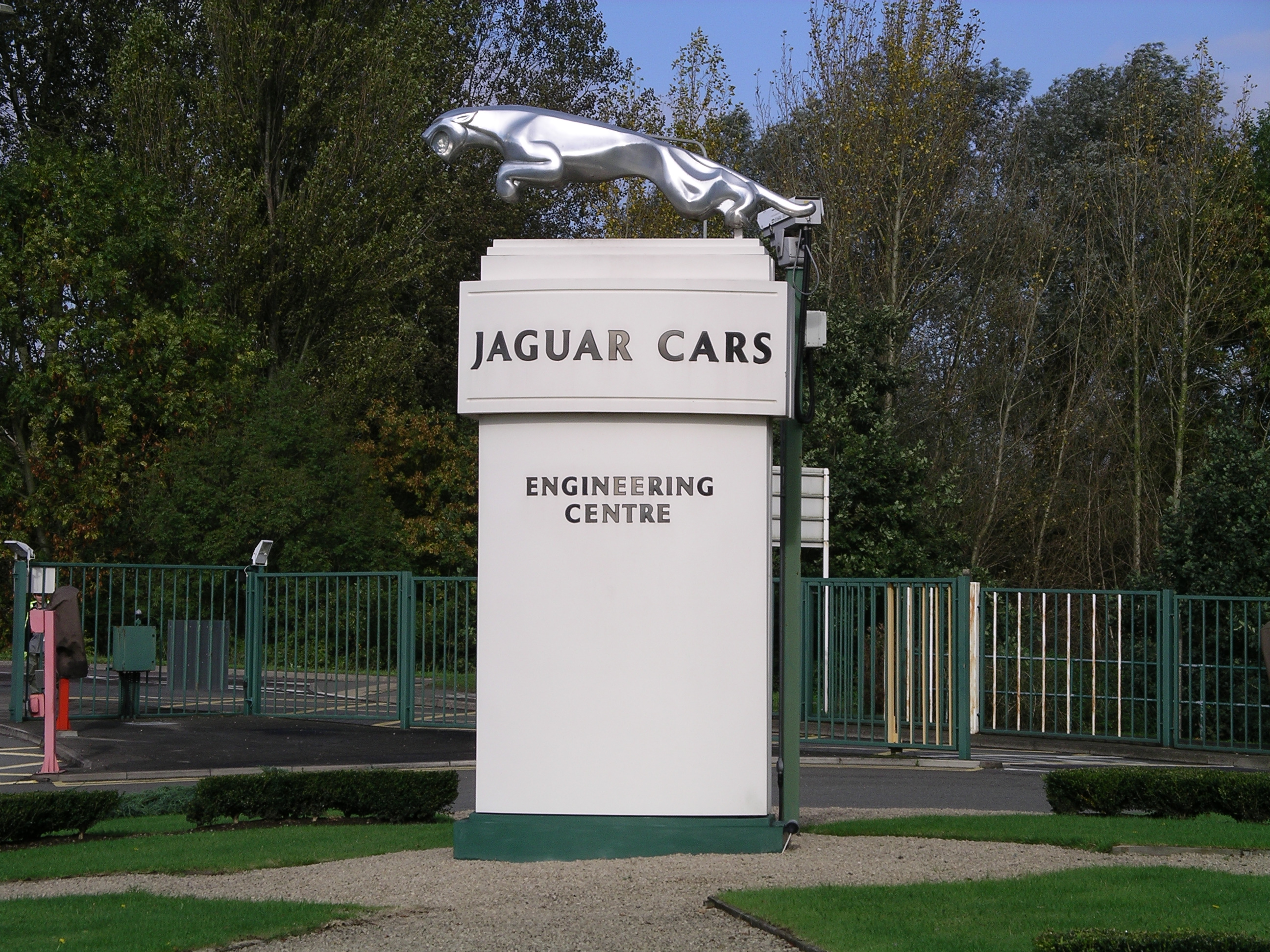
The leaping jaguar mascot outside the car company's head office south of Coventry

- Land Rover main factory
- Jaguar Cars, Peugeot UK and Citroen UK & Ireland have a large manufacturing plant at Castle Bromwich Assembly making the XJ, XF and XK.

Nearest Birmingham

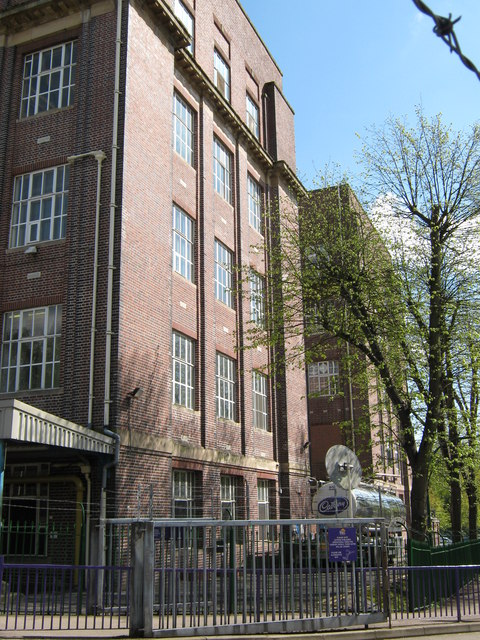
Cadbury in Birmingham

- Cadbury's main plant and Cadbury World remains in Bournville, Birmingham; since 2012.
- B Mason & Sons produce rolled copper and cupronickel alloy precision strips; applications include submarine communication cables.
- Kiepe Electric UK (former Vossloh-Kiepe)
- Goodyear Tyres
- Dunlop Aircraft Tyres manufacture and retread
- Claire's (accessories) European head office is at Erdington.
- Royal Society for the Prevention of Accidents in training, surveying and policy advice.

Outskirts of County

- HiQ, tyre merchants.
- UK Mail
- Genting Group UK casinos
- Dana Traction Technologies make axles (including that of the Ford Transit and Range Rover).
- TIMET UK.
- Goodrich Engine Controls make engine control systems for jet engines
- Pilkington Automotive make Triplex Safety Glass
- Alcoa plant
- Small-scale production of MG by Nanjing Automobile Group on part of the former MG Rover Group site
- Schaeffler Group UK (inc. INA) make timing belts and wheel bearings) for wind turbines, passenger cars and aircraft
- The Works (retailer) distribution centre, books, puzzles, toys and games
- The Defence Infrastructure Organisation (former Defence Estates)
- Eaton Electric make residual-current devices
- National Highways National Traffic Control Centre
- Ishida Europe makes industrial multihead weighers and food processing equipment
- Aisin Europe Manufacturing
- Keiper UK automotive seating

Near other main towns

- Severn Trent (water)
- Saint-Gobain UK is based at Binley Business Park.
- Coventry Building Society nearby Jewson, is in the east of the city at Binley.
- Chartered Institute of Housing
- RICS UK
- Bladon Jets develop micro gas turbines and were the first to develop an axial flow micro example in 1994.
- Halfords Autocentre
- Axeon UK distributes lithium-ion batteries
- Morgan Advanced Materials Composites and Defence Systems, make the British Army's helmet – the Mk 7 helmet and electronics for the Cougar MRAP, as well as body armour for the police.
- Bystronic UK makes laser cutting equipment
- Stadco UK design division
- The Education and Skills Funding Agency, and National Apprenticeship Service.
- AAH Pharmaceuticals and Lloyds Pharmacy, owned by Celesio.
- Sainsbury's: TU clothing distribution.
- British Chambers of Commerce, a representative and awards-giving corporate membership organisation.
- Walkers (snack foods) within their corn and wheat products ranges
- Gefco UK (owned by Peugeot)
- Co-op National Distribution Centre for the bulk of England

The Forensic Science Service, Linpac, Lafarge Cement UK and IMI plc are on the Birmingham Business Park in Bickenhill. The National Exhibition Centre (NEC) is just north. ZF Lemförder UK's site at Bickenhill makes axle modules for Land Rover. Newey and Eyre, Britain's largest electrical wholesaler, is at Sheldon. Neopost UK is off the A452. Goodrich UK is in Shirley. TRW Conekt have a main automotive engineering research centre at The Green Business Park in Shirley Heath. The Mormons (Latter Day Saints) have their European HQ in Solihull.

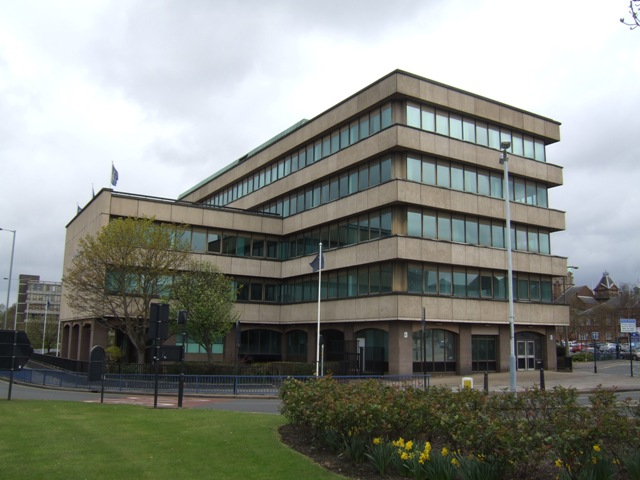
Carillion head office in Wolverhampton

The UK's VAT Registration Service, for Value Added Tax is at HMRC in Wolverhampton. Flint Ink UK in the east of the town centre, was the largest ink supplier in the British Empire, before being bought in 1998.

Essar Steel UK in west Dudley, is the largest independent steel toll processor in the UK.

Hadley Group near the Soho Foundry is the largest cold roll forming manufacturer in the UK. Caparo Precision Tubes in Oldbury, is the UK's largest producer of electric resistance welded (ERW) steel tubes, and Wellman Group make boilers to the west. Metsec, east of Oldbury, is one of the UK's largest cold roll-forming companies. The AA have a main office in Rounds Green, west of Oldbury. 2 Sisters Food Group, Britain's largest processor of chicken, is based in the West Midlands.

The national headquarters of One Stop is in Brownhills, at Clayhanger. Poundland is in Willenhall. Wedge Group, based in Willenhall, is the largest hot dip galvanising company in the UK. Assa Abloy UK (and Yale UK, former Yale & Towne), is also in Willenhall, as the town is known for manufacture of locks. A.F. Blakemore, supplies most of the SPAR shops in the UK.

== Places of interest ==
Key
	Abbey/Priory/Cathedral
Accessible open space	Accessible open space
	Amusement/Theme Park
	Castle
Country Park	Country Park
	English Heritage
	Forestry Commission
Heritage railway	Heritage railway
Historic house	Historic House
Places of Worship	Places of Worship
Museum (free) Museum	Museum (free/not free)
National Trust	National Trust
	Theatre
	Zoo

- Ackers Adventure, Birmingham,
- Aston Hall, Birmingham
- Bantock House Museum and Park, Wolverhampton
- Bescot Stadium (Walsall F.C.)
- Bilston Craft Gallery, Wolverhampton
- Birmingham Botanical Gardens
- Birmingham Bullring
- Birmingham Museum & Art Gallery
- Birmingham Hippodrome
- Black Country Living Museum, Dudley
- Blakesley Hall, Birmingham
- Cadbury World, Bournville, Birmingham
- Castle Bromwich Hall, Solihull
- Coventry Cathedral
- Coventry SkyDome Arena
- Coventry Transport Museum
- Dudley Castle
- Dudley Zoo
- Edgbaston Cricket Ground, Birmingham
- International Convention Centre (including Symphony Hall), Birmingham
- Merry Hill Shopping Centre, Dudley
- Molineux Stadium (Wolverhampton Wanderers F.C.)
- Moseley Old Hall, Wolverhampton
- National Exhibition Centre
- National Indoor Arena (NIA), Birmingham
- Sea Life Centre, Birmingham
- Netherton Tunnel, Dudley
- The New Art Gallery Walsall, Walsall
- Perrott's Folly, Birmingham
- Red House Glass Cone, Stourbridge
- Ricoh Arena (Coventry City Football Club)
- Sandwell Valley Country Park, West Bromwich
- Sarehole Mill, Birmingham
- St Andrew's (Birmingham City Football Club)
- St Peter's Collegiate Church, Wolverhampton
- Star City
- The Hawthorns (West Bromwich Albion Football Club)
- Thinktank Millennium Point, Birmingham
- Tyseley Locomotive Works, Birmingham
- University of Birmingham
- Villa Park (Aston Villa Football Club)
- Walsall Art Gallery
- West Park, Wolverhampton
- Wightwick Manor, Wolverhampton
- Winterbourne Botanic Garden, Birmingham
- Wolverhampton Art Gallery, Wolverhampton
- Wolverhampton Civic Hall, Wolverhampton
- Wolverhampton Grand Theatre, Wolverhampton
- Wolverhampton Racecourse, Wolverhampton

== Education ==
The West Midlands contains ten universities, seven of which are in Birmingham:

- Aston University
- University of Birmingham
- Birmingham City University
- University College Birmingham
- BPP University
- University of Law
- Birmingham Newman University

Both Coventry University and the University of Warwick are in Coventry whilst University of Wolverhampton is located in Wolverhampton with campuses in Telford and Walsall.

Each of the local authorities has at least one further education college for students aged over 16, and since September 1992 all of the local authorities have operated traditional 5–7 infant, 7–11 junior, and 11–16/18 secondary schools for students in compulsory education. This followed the demise of 5–8 first, 8–12 middle and 12–16/18 secondary schools in the Sutton Coldfield area.

For 18 years before September 1990, Dudley had operated 5–8 first, 8–12 middle, and 12–16/18 secondary schools before then, while Halesowen (September 1972 until July 1982) and Aldridge-Brownhills (September 1972 until July 1986) had both operated 5–9 first, 9–13 middle and 13–16/18 secondary schools.

Many local authorities still have sixth form facilities in secondary schools, though sixth form facilities had been axed by most secondary schools in Dudley since the early 1990s (and in Halesowen in 1982) as the local authorities changed direction towards further education colleges.

All secondary state education in Dudley and Sandwell is mixed comprehensive, although there are a small number of single sex and grammar schools existing in parts of Birmingham, Solihull, Wolverhampton and Walsall.

In August 2009, Matthew Boulton College and Sutton Coldfield College merged to become Birmingham Metropolitan College, one of the largest further and higher education institutions in the country.

== Media ==
=== Television ===
The area is served by BBC West Midlands and ITV Central which both broadcast from Birmingham, the local based-television station TalkBirmingham also covers the area. Television signals are received from the Sutton Coldfield transmitting station.

=== Radio ===
In terms of BBC Local Radio, the area is served by BBC Radio WM and BBC CWR covering Coventry.

Commercial radio stations include Hits Radio Birmingham, Capital Midlands, Capital Mid-Counties, Heart West Midlands, Hits Radio Coventry & Warwickshire, Smooth West Midlands, Greatest Hits Radio Birmingham & The West Midlands, and Greatest Hits Radio Black Country & Shropshire.

Community radio stations include:

- The Bridge 102.5 (Stourbridge)
- Big City Radio (Birmingham)
- Radio Plus and Hillz FM in (Coventry)
- WCR FM and Gorgeous Radio (Wolverhampton)
- Black Country Radio (Black Country)

== Sport ==
The West Midlands is home to numerous sports teams. In rugby union, the West Midlands is home to various clubs including Wasps RFC, Birmingham Barbarians, Sutton Coldfield RFC, Moseley Rugby Football Club, Birmingham & Solihull RFC, and Coventry RFC.

In rugby league, the Midlands Hurricanes are the only team from the county playing in the professional ranks, currently in the third tier League 1.

In association football, there are six Premier League and Football League teams in the county of which two, Aston Villa, and Coventry City, play in the Premier League. The following clubs are often referred to as the West Midlands "Big Six":

Club	League	City/town	Stadium	Capacity
Aston Villa	Premier League	Birmingham	Villa Park	42,788
Coventry City	Premier League	Coventry	Coventry Building Society Arena	32,609
Wolverhampton Wanderers	Championship	Wolverhampton	Molineux	31,700
Birmingham City	Championship	Birmingham	St Andrew's	30,079
West Bromwich Albion	Championship	West Bromwich	The Hawthorns	26,500
Walsall	League Two	Walsall	Bescot Stadium	11,300

The West Midlands is also home to Warwickshire County Cricket Club, who are based at Edgbaston Cricket Ground, which also hosts Test matches and One Day Internationals. The Birmingham Panthers basketball team replaced the Birmingham Bullets and are currently based at a facility provided by the University of Wolverhampton in Walsall.

The West Midlands has its own Quidditch team, West Midlands Revolution (after its part in the Industrial Revolution), which won the Quidditch Premier League in 2017.

== See also ==
- List of ceremonial counties in England by GVA
- List of conservation areas in the West Midlands (county)
- Evolution of Worcestershire county boundaries since 1844
