= Hilton =

Hilton or Hylton may refer to:

== Companies ==
- Hilton Worldwide Holdings, Inc., a global hospitality company based in the US that owns several hotel chains and subsidiary companies containing the Hilton name
  - Hilton Hotels & Resorts, flagship hotel brand operated under Hilton Worldwide Holdings, Inc.
- Conrad N. Hilton Foundation, an American non-profit charitable foundation, established in 1944 by hotel entrepreneur Conrad N. Hilton
- Ladbrokes, a British-based gambling company, known as Hilton Group plc from May 1999 to February 2006

== Places ==
=== Australia ===
- Hilton, Chatswood, a heritage-listed house in the Sydney suburb of Chatswood
- Hilton, South Australia, a suburb of Adelaide
- Hilton, Western Australia, a suburb of Perth

=== Canada ===
- Hilton, Manitoba, an unincorporated community
- Hilton, Ontario, a township
- Hilton Beach, a small village surrounded by the township in Ontario
- Hilton Falls Conservation Area, in Campbellville, Ontario

=== Norway ===
- Hilton, a farm near Kløfta, Ullensaker, known as the birthplace of Augustus Hilton, father of American hotelier Conrad Hilton

=== South Africa ===
- Hilton, KwaZulu-Natal, a town next to Pietermaritzburg
- Hilton, Bloemfontein, a suburb of Bloemfontein

=== United Kingdom ===
==== England ====
- Hilton Park (stadium), a multi-use stadium in Leigh, Greater Manchester
- Hilton Hall, an 18th-century mansion house now in use as an office and business centre at Hilton, near Wolverhampton, Staffordshire
- Hilton Park services, a motorway service station, between junctions 10a and 11 of the M6 motorway in Staffordshire
- Hilton, Cambridgeshire, a village
- Hilton, Cumbria, a village
- Hilton, Derbyshire, a village
- Hilton, Dorset, a village
- Hilton, County Durham, a village
- Hilton, North Yorkshire, a village
- Hilton, Shropshire, a village
- Hilton, Lichfield District, a village in Staffordshire
- Hilton, South Staffordshire, a civil parish in Staffordshire
- Hylton Castle in Hylton district of Sunderland
  - Cauld Lad of Hylton, the ghost of a murdered stable boy that haunts the ruins of Hylton Castle
- North Hylton, a suburb of Sunderland, in northeast England
- South Hylton Metro station, serves the village of South Hylton on the banks of the River
- South Hylton in Sunderland

==== Scotland ====
- Hilton, Aberdeen, a former village, now a neighbourhood
- Hilton of Cadboll, a village
  - Hilton of Cadboll Stone, a Class II Pictish stone discovered at Hilton of Cadboll
- Hilton, Berwickshire, a village
- Hilton, Inverness, a former village, now part of the city

=== United States ===
- Hilton, Georgia, an unincorporated community
- Hilton, Kentucky
- Hilton, Maryland, an unincorporated community
- Hilton, New Jersey
- Hilton, New York, a village
- Hilton, Oklahoma, an unincorporated community
- Hilton Peak, a mountain in California
- Hiltons, Virginia, an unincorporated community in Scott County, Virginia
- Hilton Coliseum, a 14,057-seat multi-purpose arena in Ames, Iowa
- Hilton Head Island, South Carolina, a town, located on an island of the same name
  - Hilton Head Airport, a county-owned, public-use airport in northeastern Hilton Head Island
- Lyric Theatre (New York City, 1998), formerly named the Hilton Theatre, a Broadway theatre located at 213 West 42nd Street in New York City
- Hilton Village, a planned, English-village-style neighborhood in Newport News, Virginia
  - Hilton Pier/Ravine, a park in the village
- Savannah/Hilton Head International Airport, located 7 miles (11 km) northwest of Savannah, Georgia
- Willis, Floyd County, Virginia, also known as Hylton, an unincorporated community in Floyd County, Virginia
- Hilton (Columbus, Georgia)
- Hilton (Catonsville, Maryland)

=== Vietnam ===
- Hanoi Hilton, a former prison in Hanoi

== Schools ==
- Hilton College of Hotel and Restaurant Management, University of Houston, Houston, Texas, US
- Hilton College (South Africa), Hilton, KwaZulu-Natal, South Africa
- Hilton High School in Hilton, New York, US
- C. D. Hylton High School in Woodbridge, Virginia, US
- Hilton Head Preparatory School, Hilton Head Island, South Carolina, US
- Hilton Central School District, New York State, US
- Hilton Head Christian Academy, Hilton Head Island, South Carolina, US
- Hilton Elementary School (Newport News, Virginia), US
- Hilton D. Bell Intermediate School, Garden Grove, California, US
- Hilton Leech House and Amagansett Art School, Sarasota, Florida, US
- Red House Academy, formerly Hylton Red House School, Sunderland, Tyne and Wear, England

== People ==
- Conrad Hilton, founder of the Hilton Hotels Group
  - Hilton family, the extended family of Conrad Hilton
- Hilton (surname)
- Hilton (given name)

== Other uses ==
- Bangkok Hilton (1989), an Australian television miniseries
- Chip Hilton Player of the Year Award, presented to a basketball player who has demonstrated personal character both on and off the court
- Conrad N. Hilton Humanitarian Prize, the largest humanitarian award in the world
- Eckmann–Hilton argument, an argument in mathematics about two monoid structures on a set where one is a homomorphism for the other
- The Hanoi Hilton (film) (1987), a Vietnam War film which focuses on the experiences of American prisoners of war who were held in the Hanoi Hilton
- Hilton Flight, a horse ridden in international show jumping by Richard Spooner
- Hilton International Stakes, a Group 2 Australian thoroughbred horse race
- Hilton Quota, the quota applied to beef imported from certain countries into the European Union
- Hilton v. Guyot (1895), a U.S. Supreme Court case in which the court described the factors to be used when considering the application of comity
- Hilton's law, an observation on topological anatomy
- Hilton's white line, a boundary in the anal canal
- Hylton v. United States (1796), a U.S. Supreme Court case involving judicial review
- I Want To Be a Hilton (2005), a weekly NBC reality television series that was hosted by Kathy Hilton
- London Hilton bombing, a 1975 explosion at the Hilton Hotel in London, England
- Sydney Hilton Hotel bombing, a 1978 explosion outside the Hilton Hotel in Sydney, Australia
- "The Milton Hilton", the local nickname of the Otago Corrections Facility prison in Milton, New Zealand

== See also ==
- Hilton Hotel (disambiguation)
- Hilton House (disambiguation)
- Hiltonia, Georgia
