= Hilton House =

Hilton House may refer to:

in England

- Hilton House, Berkshire, an English nobility family seat
- Hilton House, Bolton, a hamlet in Greater Manchester

in the United States

- Hilton (Columbus, Georgia), listed on the National Register of Historic Places (NRHP)
- Martin Hilton House, Ashland, Kentucky, listed on the NRHP in Boyd County, Kentucky
- Hilton (Catonsville, Maryland), NRHP-listed
- McClure-Hilton House, Merrimack, New Hampshire, NRHP-listed
- Hilton House (Magdalena, New Mexico), NRHP-listed
- August Holver Hilton House, Socorro, New Mexico, NRHP-listed
- Peter A. Hilton House, Beekman Corners, New York
- Adam Hilton House, Guilderland, New York, NRHP-listed
- Hilton House (White Lake, South Dakota), NRHP-listed
- Fulkerson-Hilton House, Hiltons, Virginia, NRHP-listed
- Hilton House Hotel, Beloit, Wisconsin, listed on the NRHP in Rock County, Wisconsin

== See also ==
- Hilton (disambiguation)
- Hilton Hotel (disambiguation)
