= Hilton (given name) =

Hilton is a given name.

- G. Hilton Scribner, American lawyer and politician
- Hilton Als, New Yorker critic
- Hilton Armstrong (born 1984), American Basketball Player
- Hilton Cheong-Leen, chairman and the founder of the Hong Kong Civic Association
- Hilton Crowther, former British chairman of Huddersfield Town and, subsequently, Leeds United
- Hilton Dawson, British Labour Party member of Parliament
- Hilton Delaney, Australian rugby league player
- Hilton Edwards, Irish actor and theatrical producer
- Hilton Gomes (1924–1999), Brazilian newscaster
- Hilton Gomes (1935–2002), Brazilian footballer
- Hilton Jefferson, American jazz alto saxophonist
- Hilton Kidd (1922–2011), Australian rugby league footballer
- Hilton Koch, furniture dealer and store owner in Houston, Texas
- Hilton Kramer, U.S. art critic and cultural commentator
- Hilton Martins Júnior (born 1980), Brazilian footballer
- Hilton McConnico, American designer and artist
- Hilton McRae, Scottish actor
- Hilton Philipson, politician in the United Kingdom
- Hilton Ruiz, Puerto Rican-American jazz pianist
- Hilton Schleman, English author
- Hilton Smith, American right-handed pitcher in Negro league baseball
- Hilton Valentine, British musician, who was an original guitarist in The Animals
- Hilton Wick, member of the Vermont State Senate
- Hilton Young, 1st Baron Kennet, British politician and writer
- Hylton Ackerman, former South African first class cricketer
- Hylton Deon Ackerman, South African cricketer
- Hylton Murray-Philipson, Conservative Party politician in the United Kingdom
- Hylton Philipson, English cricketer
- John Hilton Grace, British mathematician
- R. D. Hilton Smith, British librarian and once head of the Toronto Public Library
