= Peter Hilton (disambiguation) =

Peter Hilton (1923–2010), British mathematician

Peter Hilton may also refer to:

- Peter Hilton (British Army officer) (1919–1995), senior officer in the British Army and a businessman
- Peter A. Hilton House, historic home located at Beekman Corners in Schoharie County

== See also ==
- Peter Milton, various people
