= Tardequeia =

Settlement and station (mutatio) of ancient Cilicia

Coordinates: 36°56′14″N 35°53′09″E

Tardequeia was a settlement and station (mutatio) of ancient Cilicia, on the road between Adana and Issus, inhabited during Byzantine times.

Its site is tentatively located near Kurtkulağı in Asiatic Turkey.
