= Tarpodizo =

Populated place in ancient Thrace

Coordinates: 41°50′48″N 27°21′15″E

Tarpodizo was a settlement and station (mutatio) of ancient Thrace, inhabited during Roman and Byzantine times.

Its site is located near Kayova in European Turkey.
