= Wall, Staffordshire =

Village in Staffordshire, England

Coordinates: 52.658°N 1.854°W

Wall
- St John's Church in the 19th century

- Location within Staffordshire
- Population: 433 (2011)
- OS grid reference: SK103070
- Civil parish: Wall
- District: Lichfield
- Shire county: Staffordshire
- Region: West Midlands
- Country: England
- Sovereign state: United Kingdom
- Post town: Lichfield
- Postcode district: WS14
- Dialling code: 01543
- Police: Staffordshire
- Fire: Staffordshire
- Ambulance: West Midlands
- UK Parliament: Lichfield

Wall is a small village and civil parish in Staffordshire, England, just south of Lichfield. It lies on the site of the Roman settlement of Letocetum.

The parish includes the small villages of Pipehill, Hilton and Chesterfield, and the tiny hamlet of Aldershawe, which is about 1/2 mi (800 m) north of the village of Wall.

The nearby junction of the A5 and A5127 roads and the M6 Toll motorway is often referred to as 'Wall Island'.

== History ==
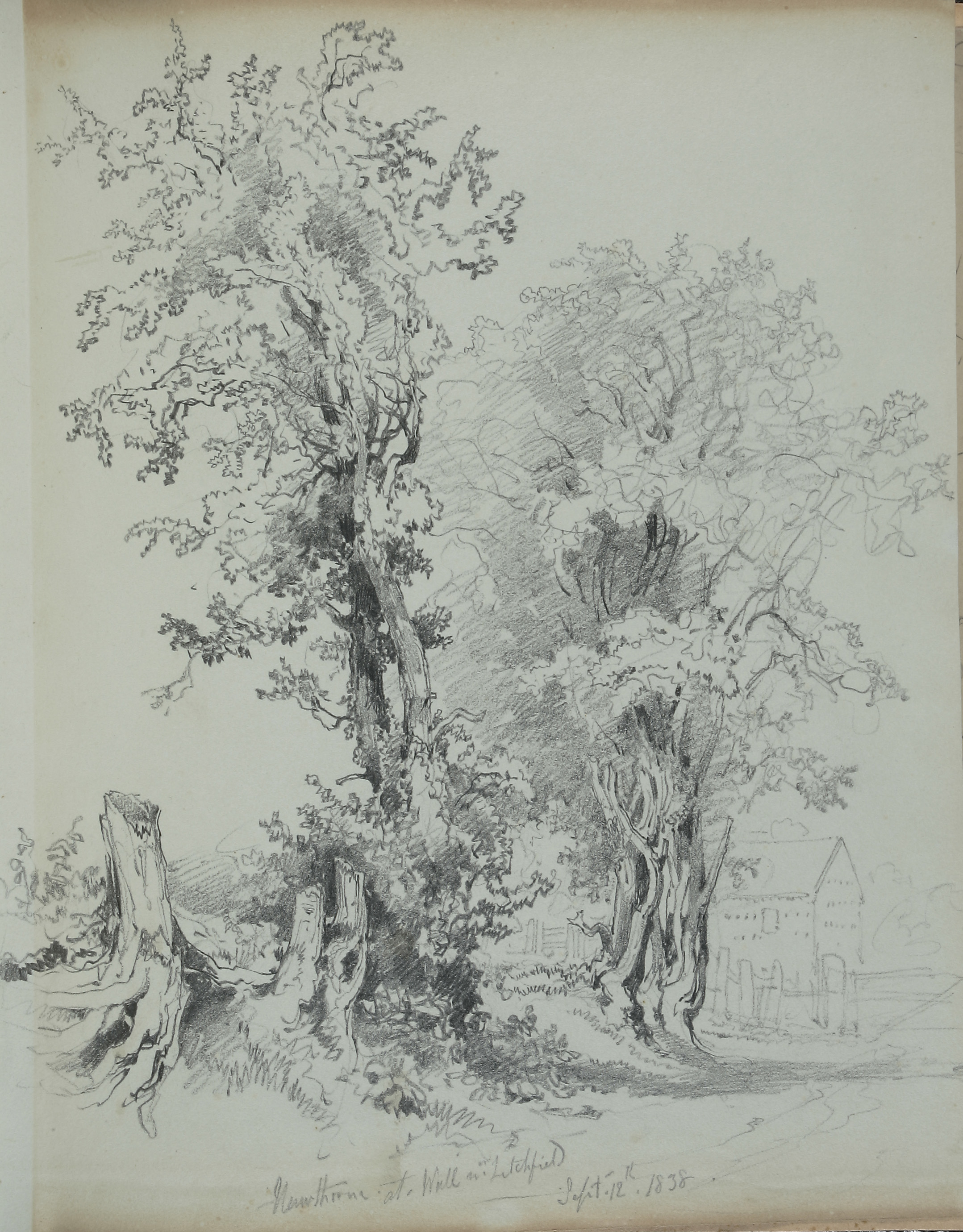
Hawthorn trees at Wall, sketched in 1838

=== Letocetum ===
The earliest evidence of settlement in Wall is the discovery of flints dating to the Neolithic period found in the upper part of Wall village. The first detailed evidence of human settlement comes in the 1st century. A Roman fort named Etocetum (reflecting an indigenous name reconstructed as *Lētocaiton or "Greywood") was established at Wall in or soon after AD 50 to accommodate Legio XIV, then advancing towards Wales.

A fort was certainly built in the upper area of the village near to the present church in 50s or 60s and Watling Street was constructed to the south in the 70s. A bath house and mansio was built on the lower ground south west of the fort in the late 1st century for use by its soldiers. It was later used by the inhabitants of a civilian settlement which grew up around Watling Street.

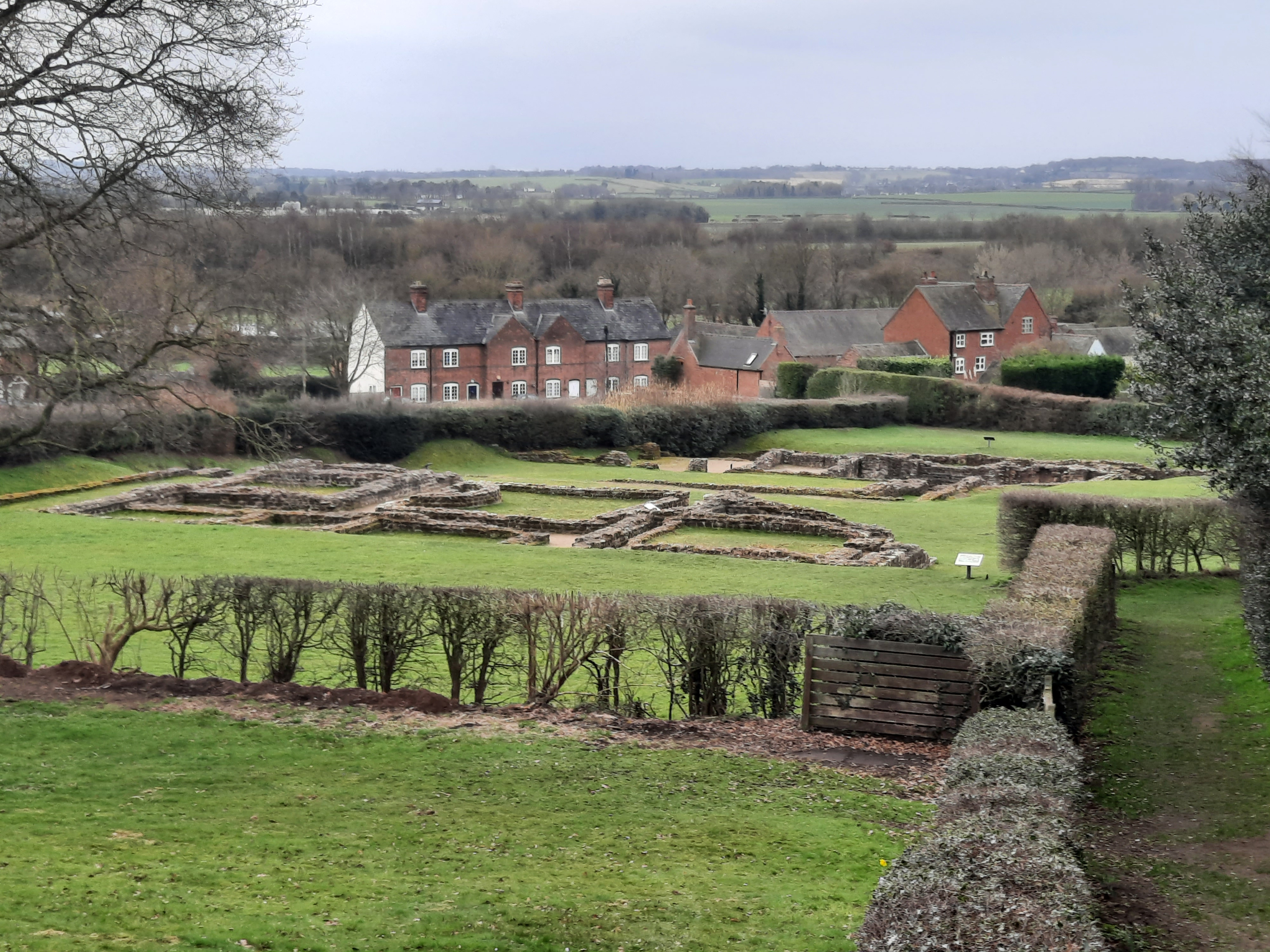
Letocetum in 2023

In the 2nd century the settlement covered approximately 30 acres (12 ha) west of the later Wall Lane. By the 1st or 2nd century there was a burial area beyond the western end of the settlement. The settlement was mentioned in the Antonine Itinerary.

In the late 3rd or early 4th century the eastern part of the settlement of approximately 6 acres (2.4 ha), between the present Wall Lane and Green Lane and straddling Watling Street, was enclosed with a stone wall surrounded by an earth rampart and ditches. Civilians continued to live inside the settlement and on its outskirts in the late 4th century. The settlement appears to have declined rapidly soon after the Romans left Britain in AD 410 and the focus of settlement shifted to Lichfield. Despite this shift of population, David Ford identifies the community as the Cair Luit Coyd ("Fort Grey Woods") listed by Nennius among the 28 cities of Britain in his History of the Britains.

=== Modern Wall ===
Development of Wall since the Romans has been slow, and it has never developed beyond a small village. The earliest medieval settlement may have been on the higher ground. Wall House on Green Lane, although dating from the 18th century, is probably on the site of the medieval manor house. Wall Hall to the south also dates from the mid 18th century but replaced a house which existed in the 17th century. By the late 18th century several dwellings were built on Watling Street west of Manor Farm and formed the lower part of the village.

In 1839 the church was built, and in 1843 was consecrated as the Church of England parish church of St John. The architects were George Gilbert Scott and William Moffatt. The church consists of a nave, a chancel and a west steeple. The steeple has a three-stage tower with diagonal buttresses and a west door; it is square at the base, rises to become octagonal, and is surmounted by a spire with lucarnes. The east window has three lights and is in Perpendicular style.

The Trooper Inn existed by 1851. In the 1950s ten council houses were built on a road called The Butts. The re-routing of the A5 around Wall in 1965 relieved the village of traffic, re-establishing its quiet nature.

== Geography ==
Topography

The upper part of Wall village lies at an elevation of 114 m on the edge of a plateau; the lower part to the south of Watling Street lies 16 m lower. At Aldershawe the land lies at 130 m, and it is the same level at Pipehill and Muckley Corner.

Geology

The north of the parish including Pipehill, Aldershawe and east parts of Wall are underlain with Bromsgrove Sandstone. The south of the parish including west Wall, Hilton and Chesterfield are underlain by Wildmoor Sandstone. A narrow gravel terrace runs north west from Wall to a point south of Pipehill where it merges into an area of Boulder Clay. South of Wall glaciofluvial deposits overlie the area including, Hilton and Chesterfield.

Hydrology

Black brook runs below the gravel terrace west of Wall. Crane brook runs through Hilton and Chesterfield and is the source for Hilton's main street name of 'Cranebrook Lane'. A spring south of Pipe Grange feeds a stream which flows east to Leamonsley Brook. A spring rising in Aldershawe was used for centuries as the source for drinking water for the city of Lichfield. Conduits were dug from Aldershawe to Lichfield where they supplied water from various conduits around the city.

== See also ==
- Listed buildings in Wall, Staffordshire
