= Apodyterium =

Enterance of public baths, intended for undressing and storage of clothes

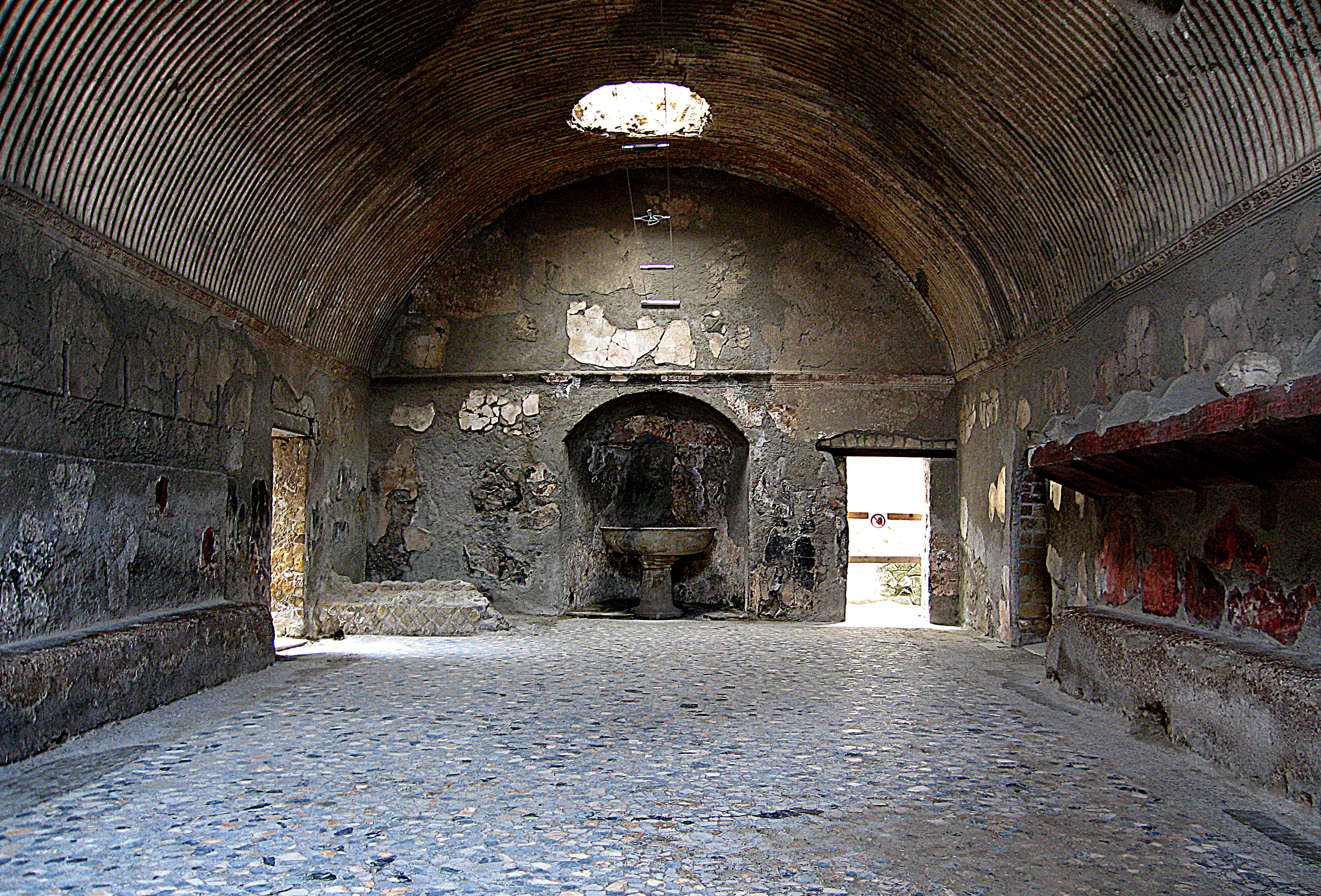
Apodyterium at Central Thermae (Herculaneum) – men's sector

In ancient Rome, the apodyterium (from Ancient Greek: ἀποδυτήριον, "undressing room") was the primary entry in the public baths, composed of a large changing room with cubicles or shelves where citizens could store clothing and other belongings while bathing.

Privately owned slaves, or one hired at the baths (called a capsarius), would look after belongings while citizens enjoyed the pleasures of the baths. A contemporary Roman schoolbook quotes a wealthy young Roman schoolboy who entered the baths, leaving his slave behind in the apodyterium: "Do not fall asleep, on account of the thieves" (ne addormias propter fures, CGL 3.651.10). A wealthy person might even bring more than one slave along, as parading one's slaves at the baths was a way to show one's elevated social status. For wealthy free men and women, slaves carried the bathing paraphernalia: exercise and bathing garments, sandals, linen towels, and a toilet kit that consisted of anointing oils, perfume, a sponge, and strigils (curved metal instruments used to scrape oil, sweat, and dirt from the body).

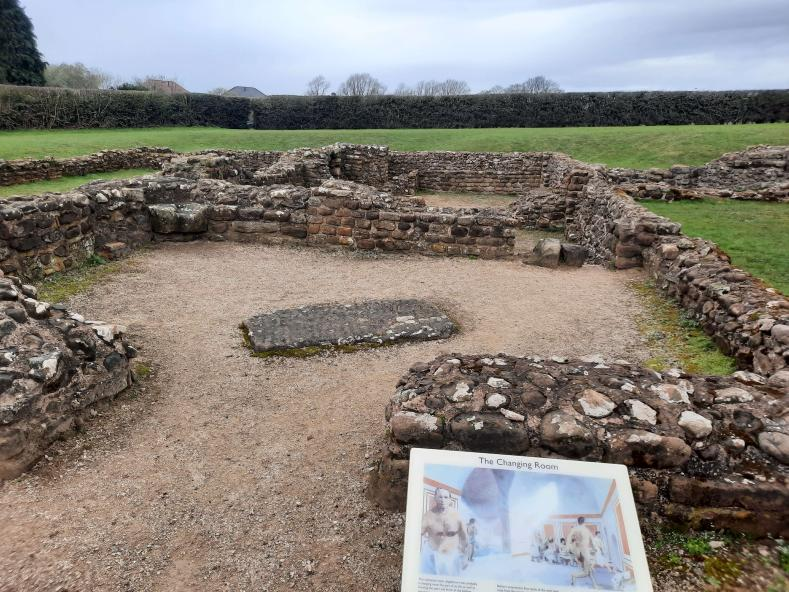
Apodyterium at Letocetum, England

In case of theft, one could respond by appealing to one of the Roman gods for retribution. A curse on the wrongdoer was written on tablets and offered up to the gods, who were asked to intervene. Many of these curse tablets were found at the spring at Bath, England. One of them reads: "Solinus to the Goddess Sulis Minerva. I give to your divinity and majesty [my] bathing tunic and cloak. Do not allow sleep or health to him who has done me wrong, whether man or woman, whether slave or free, unless he reveals himself and brings goods to your temple."

== See also ==
- Ancient Roman bathing

== Sources ==
- Fagan, Garrett G. (2002). Bathing in Public in the Roman World. University of Michigan Press. ISBN 9780472088652.
