= Letocetum =

Roman settlement remains in Staffordshire, England

Coordinates: 52.6569°N 1.8565°W

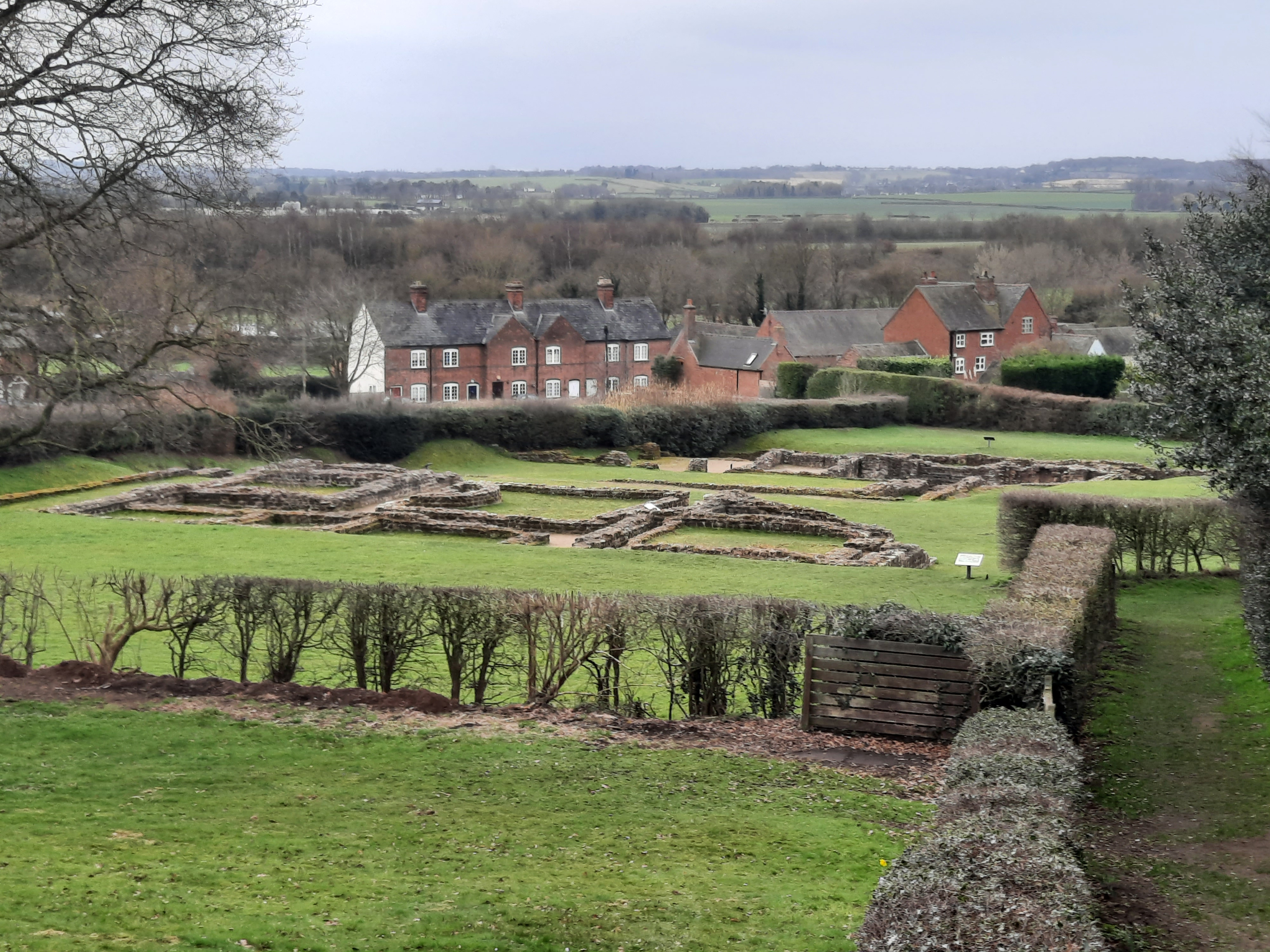
- View of Letocetum from St. John the Baptist Church
- Interactive map of Letocetum
- Type: mansio and bath house
- Periods: Roman Empire
- Cultures: Romano-British
- Location: Wall, Staffordshire
- Region: England

History
- Built: c. 50 CE
- Abandoned: 4th century

Site notes
- Condition: Ruins
- Owner: National Trust
- Public access: Yes

Letocetum is the ancient remains of a Roman settlement. It was an important military staging post and posting station near the junction of Watling Street, the Roman military road to north Wales, and Icknield (or Ryknild) Street (now the A38). The site is now within the parish of Wall, Staffordshire, England. It is owned and run by the National Trust, under the name Letocetum Roman Baths Site & Museum. The site is in the guardianship of English Heritage as Wall Roman Site.

The Romans came to Letocetum in 50AD to establish a fortress during the early years of the invasion of Britain. The land could not support large numbers of soldiers and Letocetum, at an important cross-roads, became a large scale posting station. The settlement developed with successive bath houses and mansiones built to serve the official travellers as well as the growing civilian population. It is known mainly from detailed excavations in 1912–13, which concentrated on the sites of the mansio and bath-house.

The remains visible today are those of the stone bath house and mansio, built in approximately 130AD after Letocetum ceased to have a military function and became a civilian settlement. The settlement reached its peak during the 2nd and 3rd centuries and at this time occupied 8.1–12 hectares (20–30 acres). At the end of the 3rd century, the town relocated within high defensive walls astride Watling Street. After the Romans left early in the 5th century the settlement went into decline. The modern village of Wall emerged in the land once occupied by Letocetum.

== Name ==
The site is mentioned as Etocetum in the Antonine Itinerary and presumably represented a Latinisation of a Brittonic place name reconstructed as *Lētocaiton ("Grey-wood"; cf. Old Welsh: Luitcoyt and modern Welsh Lwytgoed ). The name possibly represented the species of tree prominent at the site such as ash and elm. Ford identifies the community as the Cair Luit Coyd ("Fort Greywood") listed by Nennius among the 28 cities of Britain in his History of the Britains.

== History ==
=== Native settlement ===
It is likely that a small native settlement occupied the site before the advent of the Romans, possibly as the main trading station on the boundary between two British tribes, the Corieltauvi in the East Midlands whose later tribal centre was at Ratae Corieltauvorum, and the Cornovii to the west with their original capital Uriconon (which would later give its name to the important Roman British city of Viroconium) at the hill fort on The Wrekin. These tribes offered little resistance to Roman rule.

=== Military staging post ===
In about 50AD, a Roman vexillatio built a large timber fortress on a hilltop (near the site of the current church) at Letocetum. This housed the Legio XIV Gemina during the campaigns of governor Aulus Didius Gallus against the Brigantes. It was a good defensive position, but the poor farmland surrounding the fortress could not support large numbers of soldiers. During the Neronian period this initial fortress was replaced with a smaller one and Letocetum then developed into a large-scale posting station. Most of the troops moved to the fortress at Viroconium during the early administration of Gaius Suetonius Paulinus in about 58AD.

=== Posting station ===
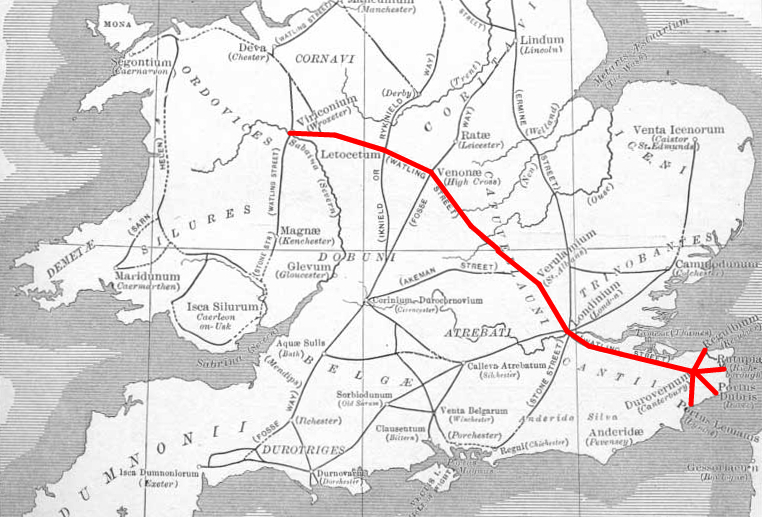
Map showing the central position of Letocetum on the Roman road network.

A mansio was built to provide lodging for official couriers travelling on Watling Street. A bath house was also built for the travellers and the growing civilian population. When the first mansio and bath house were completed, workers were needed to provide wood for the bath house, look after animals, and repair vehicles to be used by the official travellers. The civilian population would have provided many of these services. The native settlement grew during the Flavian period onwards to occupy 8.1–12 hectares (20–30 acres). Roman burials with 1st and 2nd century pottery were found along Watling Street in 1927, and more in 1966. In the field between the mansio site and Watling Street, a round depression in the ground may mark the site of a Roman amphitheatre or a circular gyrus for training horses (an example has been excavated at the Lunt Roman Fort). A large earthenware vessel in the likeness of Minerva was found near the modern church, which may therefore be the site of a temple of Minerva. A rectangular crop-mark in the field to the north-west of the bath-house, only visible in dry weather, may be the site of another temple.

When the Legion XIV first settled at Letocetum they would have used existing trackways. A stone-surfaced road was needed to allow reliable movement. Watling Street was given a stone surface past Letocetum in about 70 CE. This date is approximated from two coins found in the centre of Letocetum beneath the first road surfacing. There is no evidence to indicate when Ryknild Street was constructed, but from the layout it is thought that Watling Street was built first. Watling Street stretched from Letocetum to London in one direction and to Wroxeter and Chester in the other. Ryknild Street, 7.3 metres (24 ft) wide where it crossed with Watling Street, connected Letocetum with Cirencester to the south west and Yorkshire to the north east.

Watling Street north of St Albans. The map shows the Roman towns established along Watling Street by the end of the first century AD.

==== Early mansiones and bath houses ====
The foundations of the last mansio built at the site, and its associated bath-house, were uncovered by archaeologists in 1912–13. The rooms of both the mansio and bath-house were emptied and the stone foundations were exposed. This work left, in some lower stratified levels, traces of the two earlier wooden mansiones.

The hillside had been terraced and the first mansio, whose construction is dated to 54–60 CE, fully occupied one terrace. It was of a sleeper beam construction, the walls were wattle and daub, some were plastered and some were painted with simple linear decoration. It has been assumed the roof was thatch and was consumed when the building was destroyed by fire. The rooms were arranged around a square courtyard approximately 19 by 19 metres (62 ft × 62 ft). Due to the construction of later buildings the known layout of the first mansio is very fragmentary. The date at which the first mansio was destroyed is uncertain, it was probably near the beginning of the 2nd century, as the destruction layers contained Flavian-Trajanic samian-ware, part of a mortarium dating from 70–100 CE and part of a glass bowl which has been dated to the 2nd century.

The evidence for the layout of the second mansio is also very fragmentary. It was a courtyard building constructed with posts set vertically in foundation trenches.

How the town may have looked in the 2nd century

The walls were plaster and daub and some rooms were painted in vivid colours. In the courtyard was a large well 2.29 by 2.44 metres (7.5 ft × 8.0 ft) and 6.1 metres (20 ft) deep, cut into the underlying sandstone. The second mansio was deliberately dismantled in about 140–150 CE during construction of the third mansio. The well was filled in at this time and contained a samian sherd dated 125–145 CE. About the same time the second hilltop fort was abandoned and the town ceased to be a military site. One of the last military features at Letocetum was the "punic ditch" associated with this last small fort. The ditch was filled before any secondary silt formed and the filling contained a Trajanic coin dated 98–117 CE and pottery suggesting a Hadrianic or early Antonine date.

The earliest bath-house was discovered during an excavation in 1956. In a construction trench of the very first building was a worn coin of Vespasian dated 71 CE, due to the condition of the coin it is believed that this building was erected around 100 CE. It is thought that this building was built during the military period as the surviving masonry is of high quality with finely dressed stone and a wall some 1.2 metres (3.9 ft) thick. It is thought that the second mansio, the last fort, and the first bath house all ended approximately at the end of the military period on the site.

==== Civilian development; the third mansio and second bath-house ====
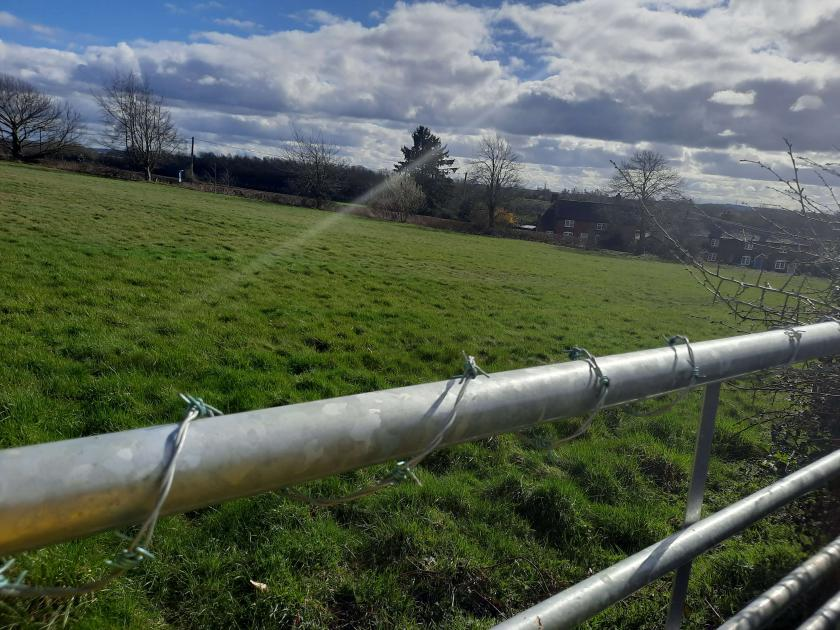
Site of the 2nd century civilian settlement, which was contemporary with the 3rd Mansio and 3rd Bath House; the site of the civilian settlement ran along Watling Street, which can be seen in the background

Letocetum ceased to be used by the military after about 130 CE, probably leaving the town under the authority of the civitas of the Cornovii with its capital at Viroconium Cornoviorum. About this time that a new mansio and bath house were built.

The third and best-understood mansio was built on a stone base about 130 CE. It was at least two storeys high and fronted by a colonnade with a tiled roof, probably supported on wooden columns. In the centre of the colonnade, a large door formed the main entrance to the interior of the building. Through the entrance hall was a colonnaded atrium or courtyard with a plastered floor, the central area probably being open to the sky and perhaps containing a herbaceous garden. Timber posts resting on these foundations around the edges of the colonnade supported a balcony above.

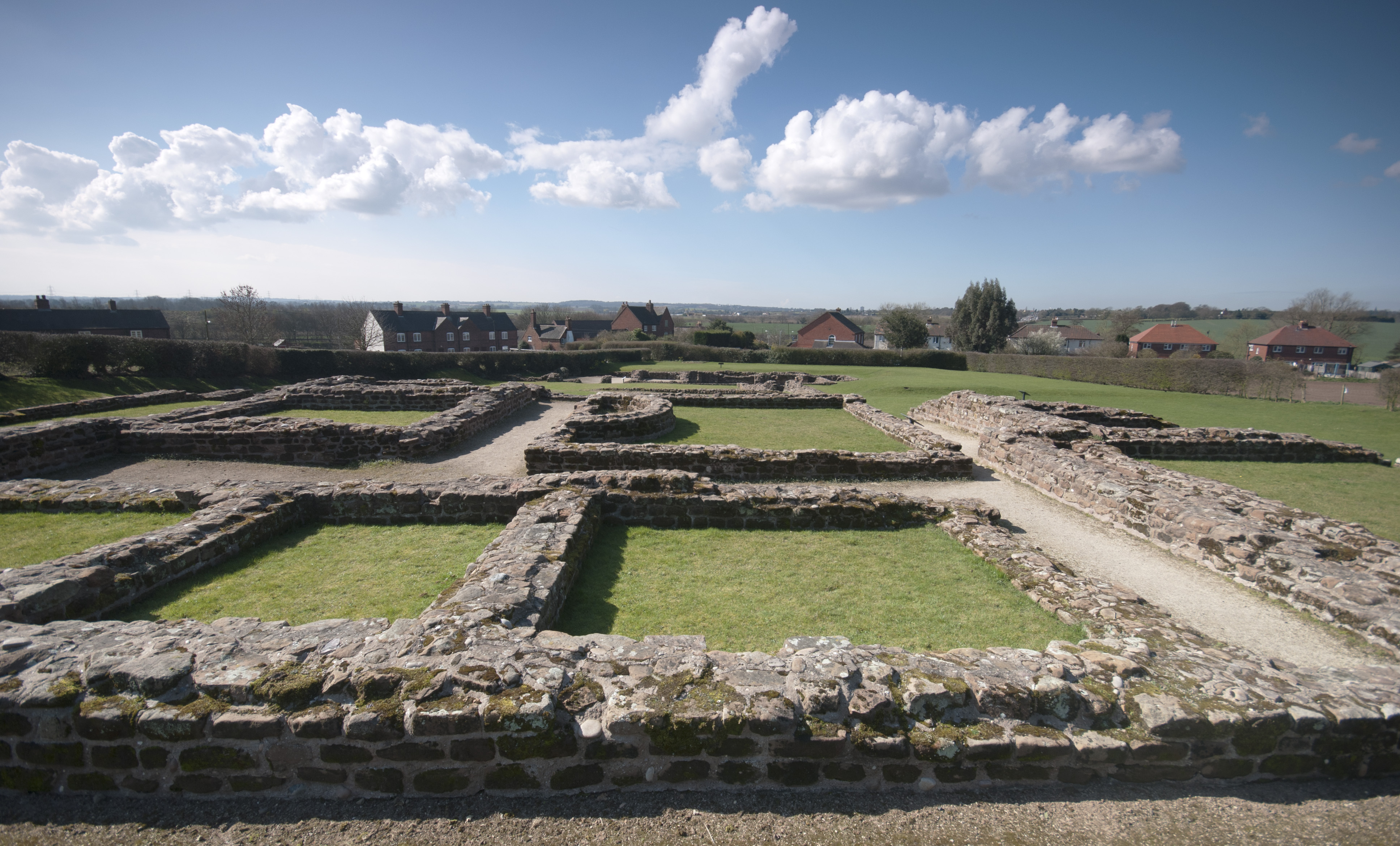
Remains of the 3rd Mansio

The entrance hall was flanked on either side by similarly sized rooms probably accessible from the central courtyard. The one on the west contained washing facilities and a gutter leading to a soak-away in the central part of the building, the room to the east may possibly have been a guardroom. On the western side of the courtyard were three small rooms which opened out onto the central colonnade at ground level. The function of these rooms is uncertain, but they were probably used as private accommodation for users of the mansio. The largest room in the mansio lay in the north-east corner, the chamber was heated by a channelled hypocaust system added some time after the building was first completed.

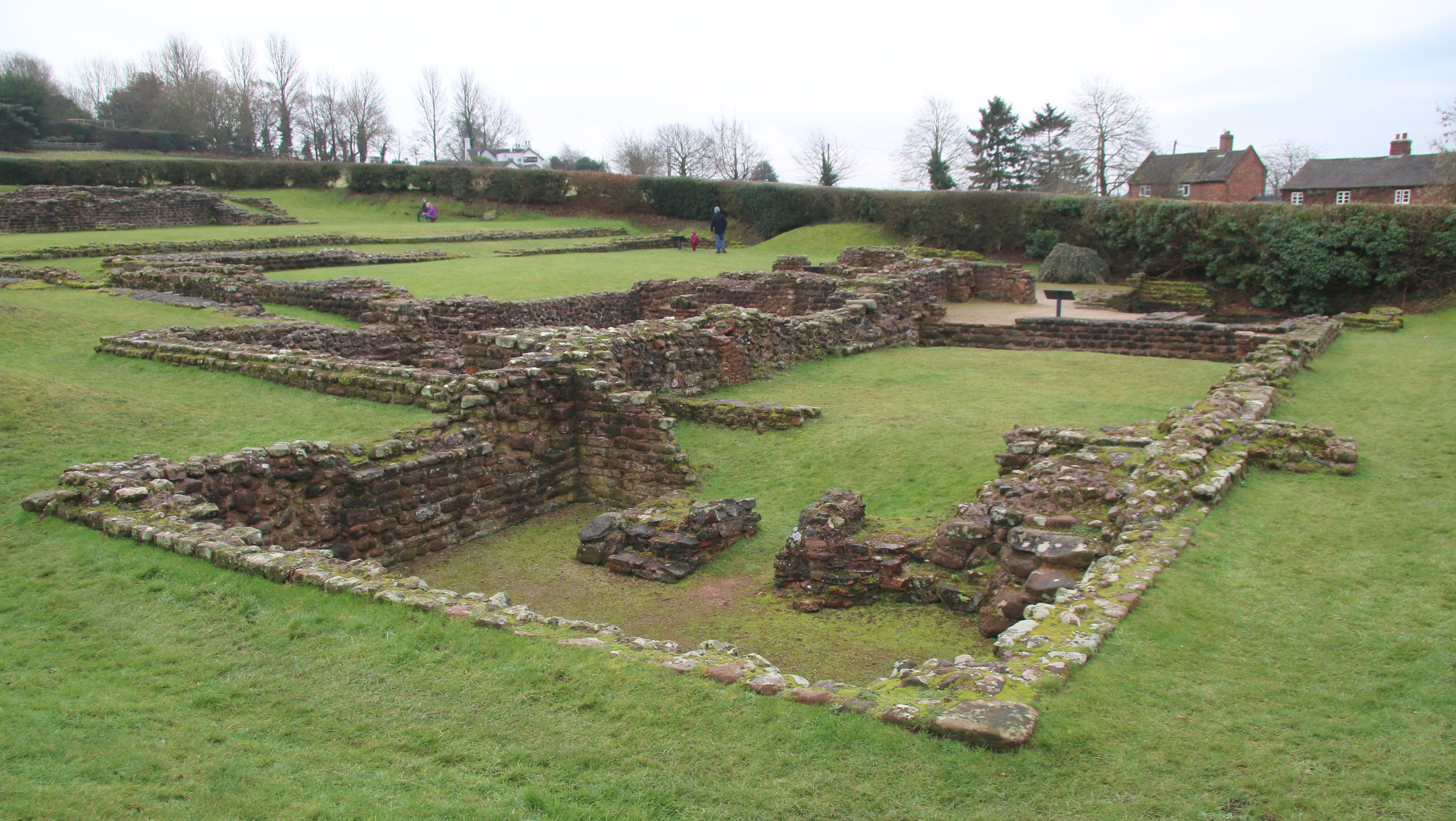
Remains of the 3rd Bath House

To the west of the mansio lay the public bath-house, separated from it by a cobbled road between 2.4 and 3 metres (7.9 and 9.8 ft) wide. From the street, a paved area led into a colonnade fronting the building on the east and continuing round the north side. Large doors in the centre of the eastern colonnade opened into a large, covered courtyard. This courtyard may have been a basilica; a settlement of this size would be expected to have one, and this is the only candidate on the site. At the far north end of the bath complex was the stoke-room or praefurnium, which contained the wood-fired furnaces of the hypocaust system. This underfloor heating system was present in the tepidarium, the caldarium and the laconicum where the floors were supported on pillars of tiles or pilae. The hot combustion gases from the stoke-room furnaces circulated under the floor between these pillars and were drawn up around the sides of the building through box tiles embedded in the walls, to escape finally through vents in the barrel-vaulted roof.

=== Late Roman defences; abandoned mansio and bath-house ===
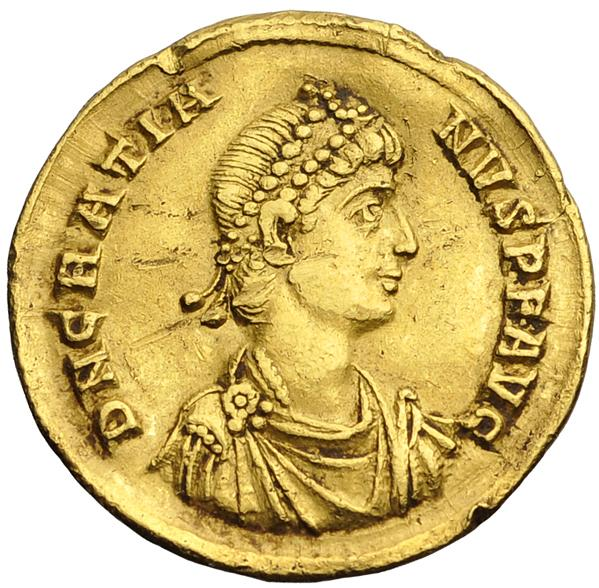
A golden coin from the time of the Emperor Gratian. The latest coin found at Letocetum was from this period.

Letocetum lost its public buildings near the end of the 3rd century; the bath-house and mansio were destroyed by fire. Around this time, very solid defences were built which did not include the bath-house or mansio sites. The reason the bath-house and mansio were abandoned can not be determined but the reason was probably economic. Other mansio sites around Britain appear to have been abandoned at this time. This did not imply an end to the posting service at Letocetum, it may have been a less costly reorganisation. The late defences were built in about 300 CE astride Watling Street, approximately 150 metres (490 ft) east of the mansio site. The defences consisted of a stone wall about 2.7 metres (8.9 ft) thick, fronted by three ditches and with a contemporary turf rampart to the rear, the area within the walls was 2.1 hectares (5.2 acres). The northern and western sides were identified and sectioned in 1964 and the foundations of a wall at the south west corner were uncovered. On the western side a section of wall was found still standing 1.5 metres (4.9 ft) high above shallow foundations but below the ploughed soil. The wall is believed to have been built within the period 275–325 CE.

It is thought that the construction of these defences was related to a general uprising of the Welsh tribes, the Ordovices and Silures, that occurred at this time. The revolt was soon quelled, but, to guard against further disruptions, a series of strongholds including Letocetum, Pennocrucium, and Uxacona were established along the length of Watling Street. All 4th century archaeological remains have come from within the defences and none from outside, suggesting that the whole population were within the defences by the 4th century. The latest coin to be found at Letocetum was minted in the time of the Emperor Gratian and dated to 381 CE. Roman administration collapsed at the beginning of the 5th century and nothing has been found at the site that is datable after this time.

=== Post-Roman abandonment and later re-occupation ===
The settlement must have been significant for some time; it is listed in the 9th-century Historia Brittonum, and Reno writes "Wall, appearing as Cair Luitcoyt, and undoubtedly correctly ascribed, appears rather incongruously among such major towns and military depots as York, London, Chester, Wroxeter and Caerleon but nevertheless must have been a place of important consequence because of its inclusion as a strategic city." The late defences led to its description as a Caer and a British, possibly Powysian, outpost was established there. We have no knowledge of the period immediately after the Roman departure as no historical or archaeological evidence is present.

Letocetum lost all importance with the development of nearby Lichfield in the 7th century as the seat of a Bishop. When the place again emerged historically it was under a new name, Wall. This name referred to the remains of the late Roman defences, parts of which were still standing in the early 19th century.

== Gallery ==
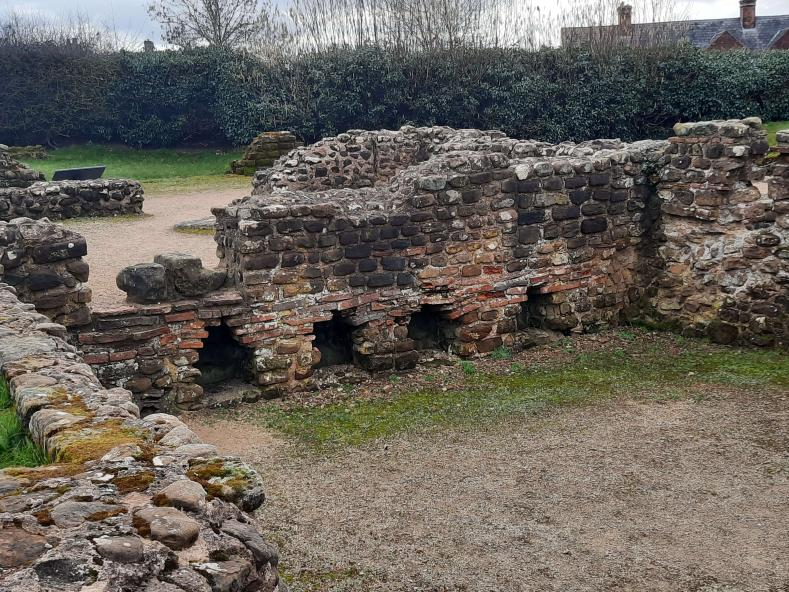
The hypocaust in the tepidarium at the 3rd Bath House, where the pilae stacks would have been

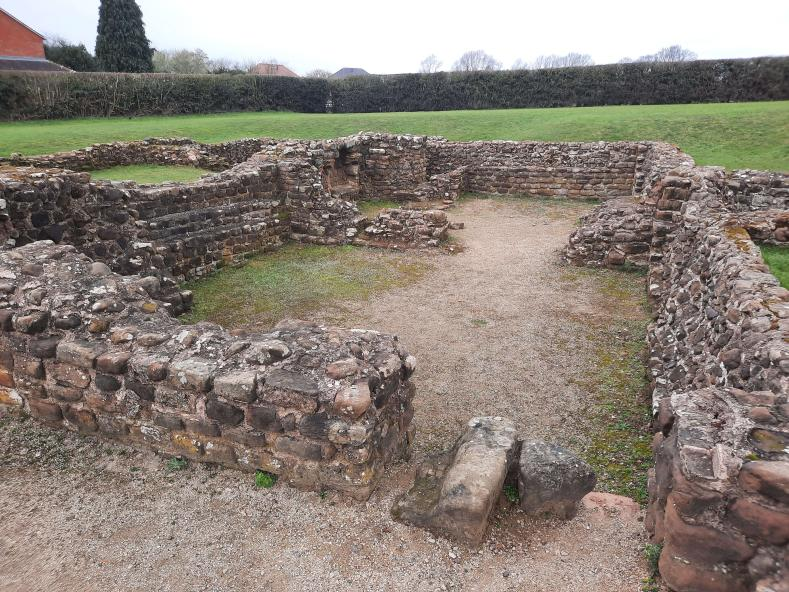
The tepidarium and caldarium at the 3rd Bath House

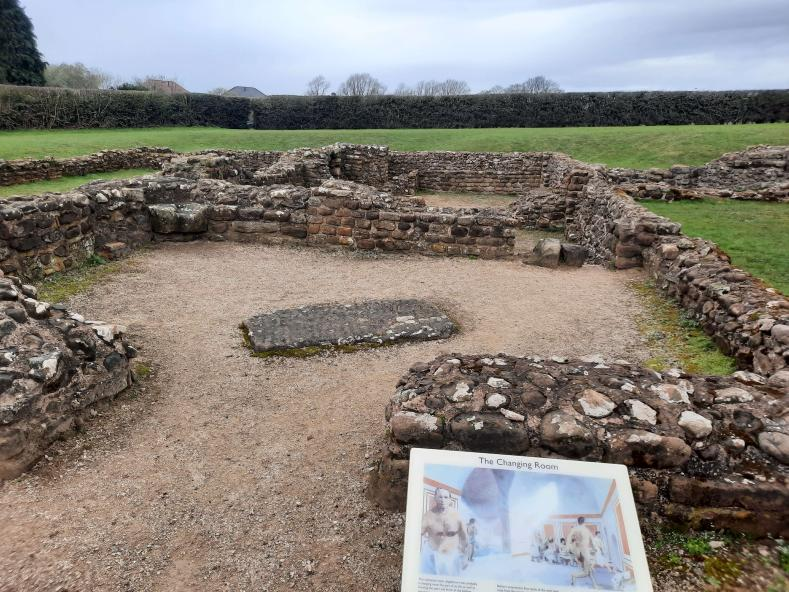
The apodyterium at the 3rd Bath House

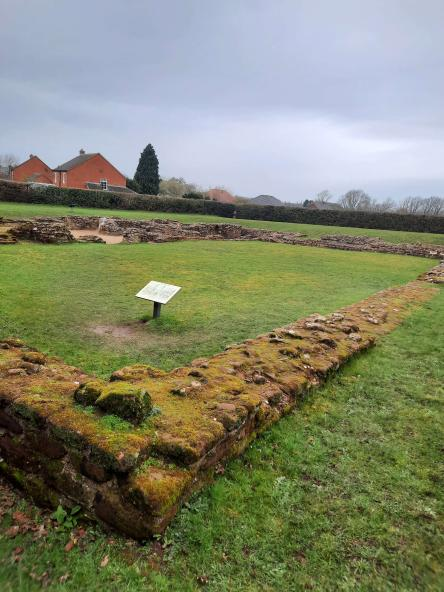
The exercise hall at the 3rd Bath House

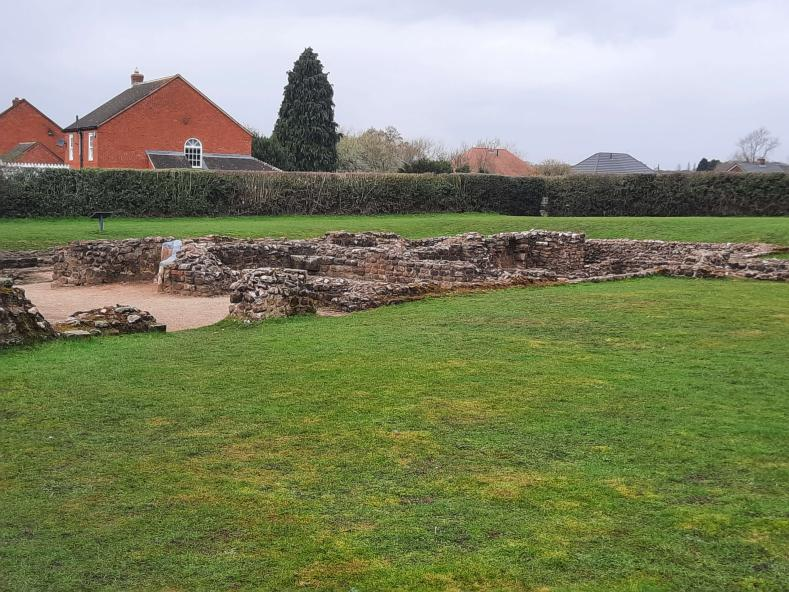
The heated rooms and apodyterium of the 3rd Bath House from the exercise hall, also from the 3rd Bath House

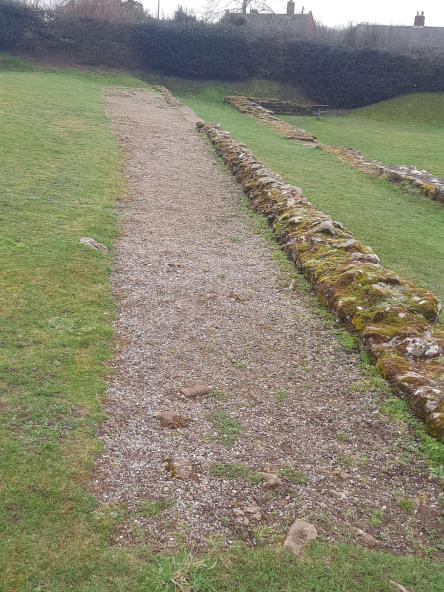
Preserved portion of the street which ran between the 3rd Mansio and the 3rd Bath House; here, the street has been preserved on the side next to the 3rd Bath House

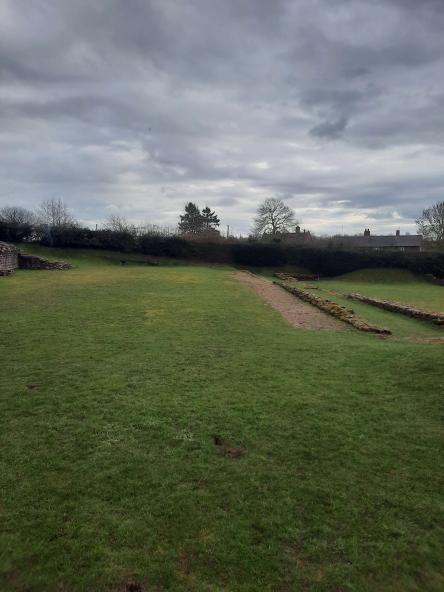
Entire length of the street which passed between the 3rd Mansio and the 3rd Bath House

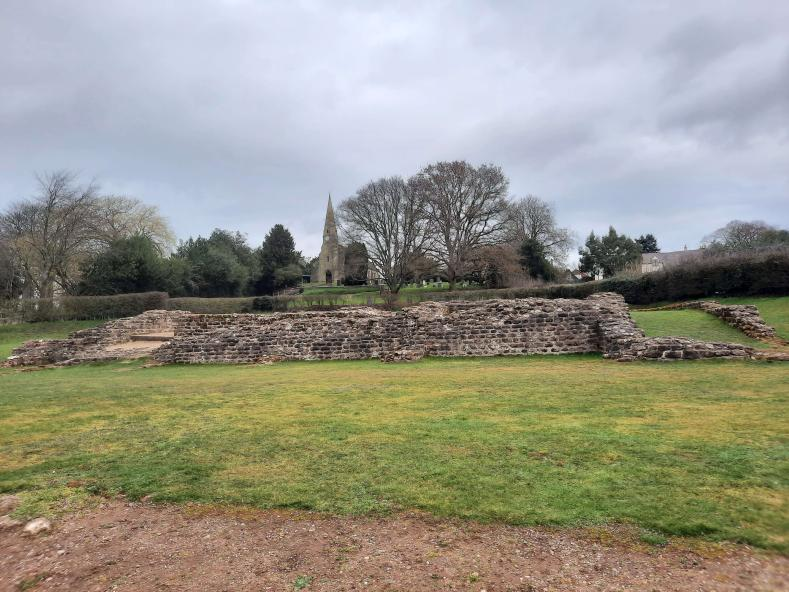
The 3rd Mansio as seen from across the street

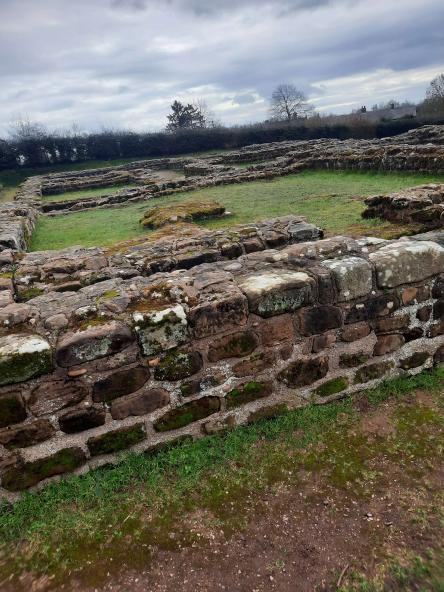
Ruins of the 3rd Mansio

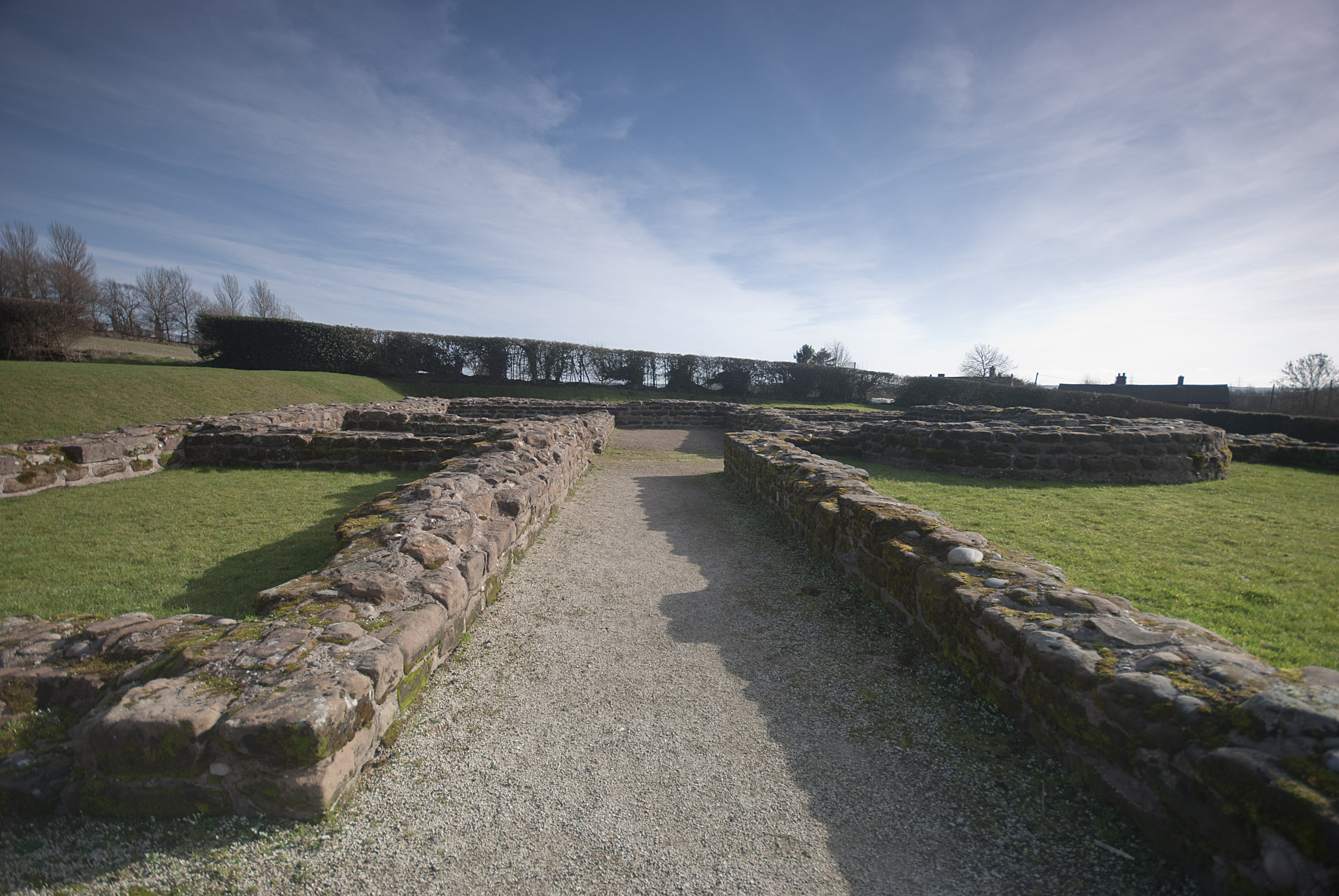
Ruins of the 3rd Mansio

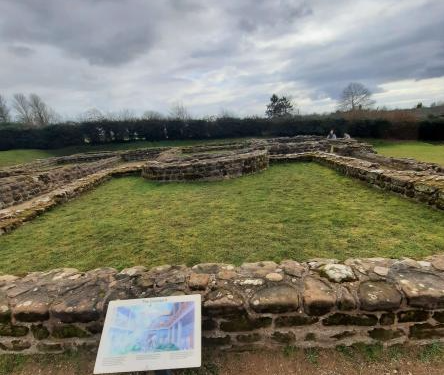
The atrium of the 3rd Mansio

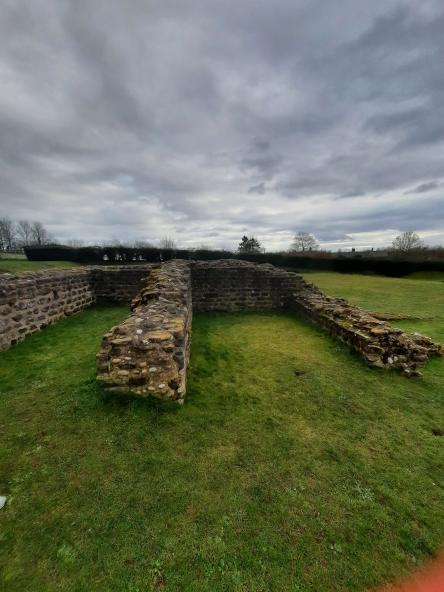
Horse stables at the 3rd Mansio

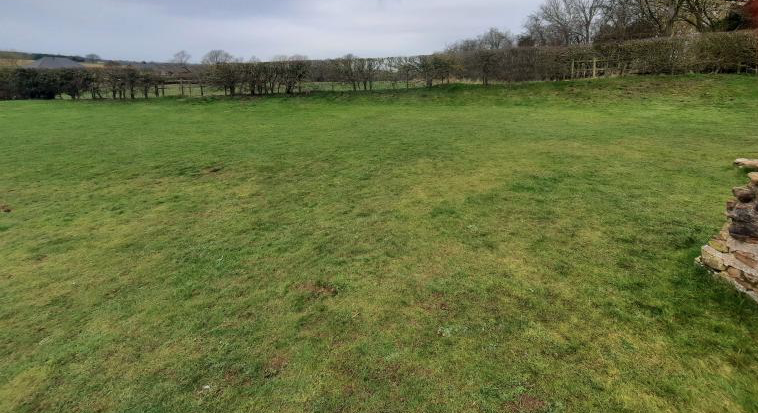
Probable site of the kitchens used to serve the 3rd Mansio

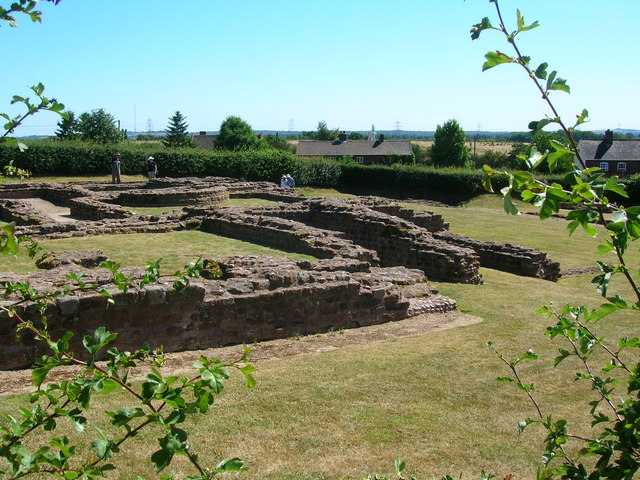
Letocetum in 2006

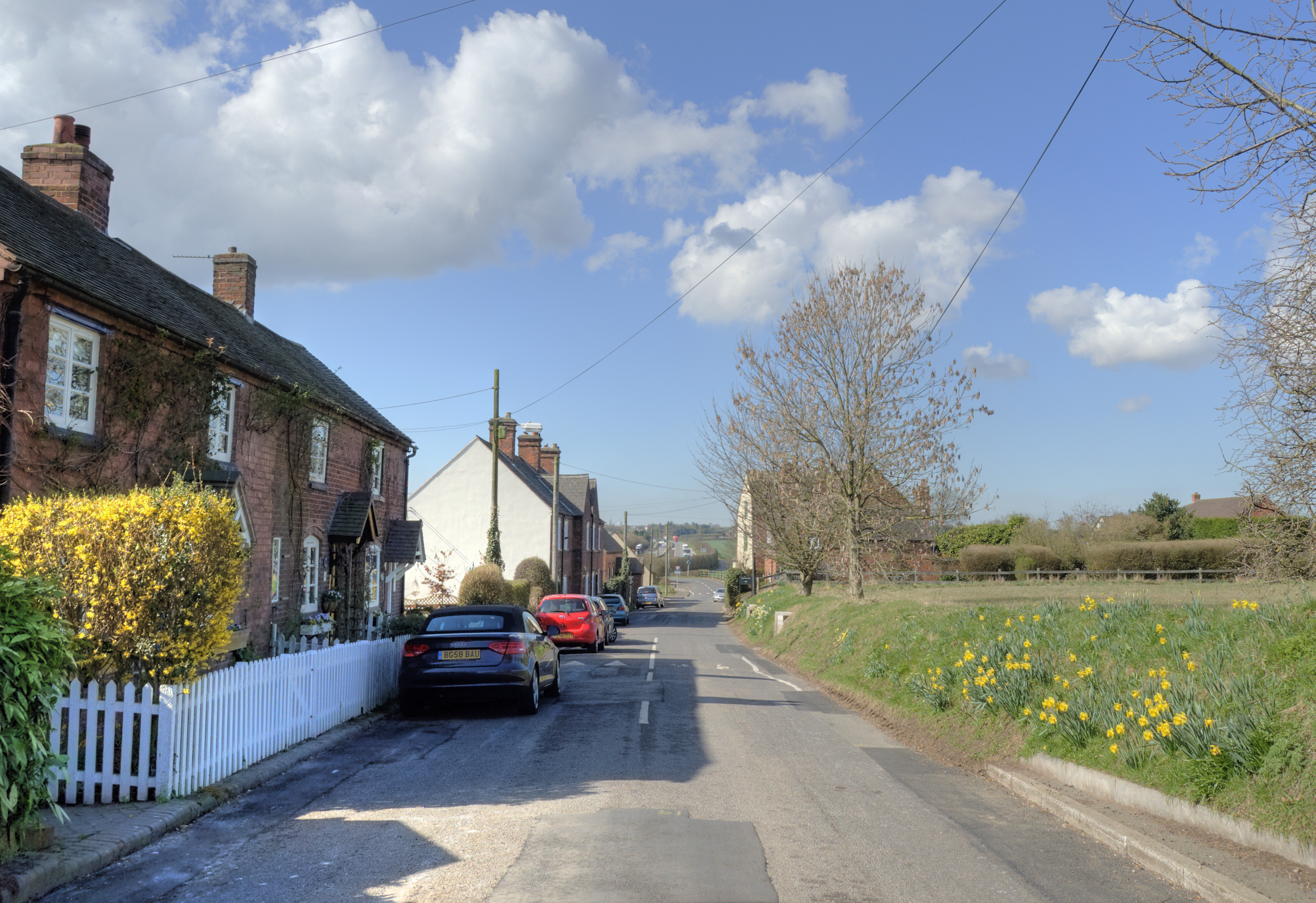
Watling Street in Wall, which used to run through Letocetum; the ruins of Letocetum are directly to the east of this stretch of Watling Street
