= Listed buildings in Wall, Staffordshire =

Wall is a civil parish in the district of Lichfield, Staffordshire, England. The parish contains 14 listed buildings that are recorded in the National Heritage List for England. All the listed buildings are designated at Grade II, the lowest of the three grades, which is applied to "buildings of national importance and special interest". The parish contains the village of Wall and the surrounding area. Most of the listed buildings are houses and farmhouses, the others being a well house, a conduit head, a barn, a church, and hand pump.

== Buildings ==
Name and location	Photograph	Date	Notes
Upper Hilltop Farmhouse; 52.67665°N 1.86628°W	—	17th century	The farmhouse was refaced in the 19th century. It has a timber framed core, the rebuilding is in brick, and the roof is tiled. There is one storey and an attic, and two bays. The windows are casements with segmental heads, there is a dormer, and the doorway is on the left side and has a segmental head.
Manor Farm, Wall Lane; 52.65614°N 1.85130°W	—	Early 18th century	The farmhouse, which retains some earlier material, was refaced in the 19th century, and is in red brick with stone dressings, quoins, a cogged eaves course, and a tile roof. There are three storeys and three bays. On the front is a gabled porch, above which is a re-set datestone, and flanking the doorway are three-sided bay windows. The other windows have moulded mullions and hood moulds.
Pipe Hill House, Walsall Road; 52.66838°N 1.86617°W	—	Early 18th century	A red brick house on a plinth, with a floor band, quoins, and a hipped tile roof. There are two storeys and an attic, and five bays. In the centre is a doorway with a moulded surround and a low pediment on consoles, the windows are mullioned and transomed casements with segmental heads, and there are two flat-headed dormers.
Pipe Place; 52.66374°N 1.87185°W	—	Mid 18th century	A farmhouse in red brick with floor bands, and a tile roof with verge parapets. There are two storeys and an attic, and a T-shaped plan. The front has two bays, and contains a doorway with a moulded surround and a pediment on consoles, casement windows with segmental heads, and gabled dormers. To the left are two circular turrets with conical roofs, and there is a large rear wing.
Wall Farmhouse, Green Lane; 52.65923°N 1.85540°W	—	Mid 18th century	The farmhouse, which possibly has an earlier core, is in red brick, and has a tile roof. There are two storeys and two wide bays. In the centre is a gabled porch, and the windows are casements, those in the ground floor with segmental heads.
Wall House, Green Lane; 52.65855°N 1.85495°W	—	1761	A red brick house with angle pilaster strips, a floor band, corbelled eaves, and a tile roof with verge parapets. There are two storeys and an attic, a double depth plan, and a front of four bays. In the centre is a flat-roofed porch with a cornice, and a doorway with a segmental head. The windows are transomed casements with segmental heads, and there are three flat-roofed dormers.
Moat Bank House; 52.65826°N 1.87122°W	—	Late 18th century	A farmhouse, possibly with an earlier core, it is in red brick, partly rendered, and has a hipped tile roof. There are three storeys, a front of four bays, a lean-to on the left, and a rear wing. The porch has columns and a pediment, and the doorway has a moulded surround and a fanlight. The windows are casements with segmental heads.
Well house at SK 101075; 52.66555°N 1.85176°W	—	Late 18th century (possible)	The well house is in red brick and has a circular plan. It is covered by a domed superstructure, and has an outlet with a stone lintel.
Conduit head at SK 101075; 52.66558°N 1.85163°W	—	1811 (or 1814)	The conduit head is in stone and there is a rectangular plan. It has Doric corner piers, an entablature, and a pediment. On the front is a round-headed entrance, and at the rear is a similar entrance, but blind and with an inscription and date on a voussoir.
Lower Hilltop Farmhouse; 52.67650°N 1.86574°W	—	Early 19th century	The farmhouse is in roughcast brick and has a hipped tile roof. There are two storeys and three bays. The central doorway has a moulded surround and a hood, and the windows are transomed small-pane casements.
Wall Hall, Green Lane; 52.65738°N 1.85419°W		Early 19th century	The house is in rendered and roughcast brick, and has a tile roof. The front has three storeys and three bays, quoins, a cornice, and a parapet. In the ground floor are two semicircular flat-roofed bay windows, with double fluted pilasters and tripartite sashes. Between them is a porch with columns, a frieze, and a cornice. The windows in the middle floor are small-pane casements with quoined surrounds and elliptical heads, and in the top floor are square sash windows.
Former barn, Wall House; 52.65884°N 1.85524°W	—	Early 19th century	The former barn is in red brick and has a tile roof with verge parapets, There are two storeys and a long range. The barn contains a threshing floor entry with an elliptical arch and vents in a diamond pattern. The other openings include casement windows, and stable doors, almost all with segmental heads. On the right gable end are dove landing ledges. (Note: Street View in July 2018 shows that the barn has been converted for residential use.)
St John's Church; 52.65771°N 1.85539°W		1839	The church, designed by George Gilbert Scott and William Moffatt, is built in sandstone and has tile roofs. It consists of a nave, a chancel and a west steeple. The steeple has a three-stage tower with diagonal buttresses and a west door. It is square at the base, it rises to become octagonal, and is surmounted by a spire with lucarnes. The east window has three lights and is in Perpendicular style.
Hand pump 52.65886°N 1.85494°W	—	Late 19th century	The hand pump is adjacent to the barn to the north of Wall House. It is in cast iron, and has a circular fluted shaft, domed capping with a finial, and a swan-necked pump handle.

== Notes and references ==
=== Sources ===
- Historic England, "Upper Hilltop Farmhouse, Wall (1038841)", National Heritage List for England
- Historic England, "Manor Farm, Wall (1374291)", National Heritage List for England
- Historic England, "Pipe Hill House, Wall (1188401)", National Heritage List for England
- Historic England, "Pipe Place, Wall (1038844)", National Heritage List for England
- Historic England, "Wall Farmhouse, Wall (1038843)", National Heritage List for England
- Historic England, "Wall House, Wall (1038842)", National Heritage List for England
- Historic England, "Moat Bank Farmhouse, Wall (1188327)", National Heritage List for England
- Historic England, "Well head at SK 101075, Wall (1188333)", National Heritage List for England
- Historic England, "Conduit head at SK 101075, Wall (1038840)", National Heritage List for England
- Historic England, "Lower Hilltop Farmhouse, Wall (1188337)", National Heritage List for England
- Historic England, "Wall Hall, Wall (1294807)", National Heritage List for England
- Historic England, "Former barn approximately 25 metres north of Wall House, Wall (1188350)", National Heritage List for England
- Historic England, "Church of St. John, Wall (1294770)", National Heritage List for England
- Historic England, "Hand pump adjacent to barn 25 metres north of Wall House, Wall (1374290)", National Heritage List for England
- Historic England, Listed Buildings
- Pevsner, Nikolaus (1974), Staffordshire, The Buildings of England, Harmondsworth: Penguin Books, ISBN 0-14-071046-9
