= Pipehill =

Hamlet in Staffordshire, England

Coordinates: 52.670°N 1.864°W

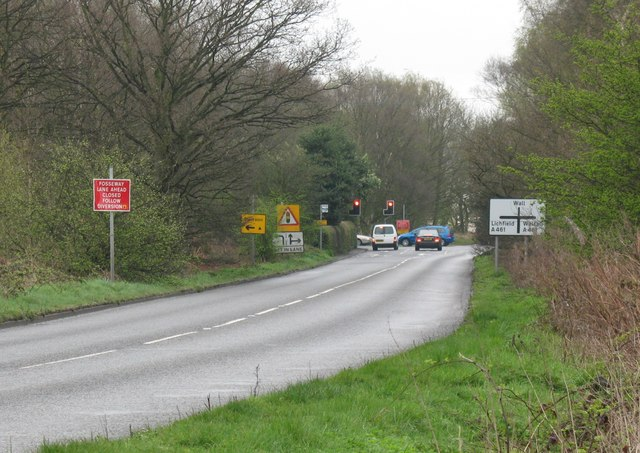

- Location within Staffordshire
- Civil parish: Hammerwich
- District: Lichfield
- Shire county: Staffordshire
- Region: West Midlands
- Country: England
- Sovereign state: United Kingdom
- Post town: BURNTWOOD
- Postcode district: WS7
- Dialling code: 01543
- Police: Staffordshire
- Fire: Staffordshire
- Ambulance: West Midlands
- UK Parliament: Lichfield

Pipehill is a hamlet and former civil parish, now in the parish of Hammerwich, in the Lichfield district, in the county of Staffordshire, England. It is located between Wall and Hammerwich. In 1891 the parish had a population of 139.

The village consists of farms, housing, petrol station, offices and Pipehills Fisheries.

There is an hourly bus service that runs through Pipehill from Lichfield to Walsall via Walsall Wood and Aldridge. The nearest railway station is Lichfield City. The now disused South Staffordshire Line ran through the hamlet with a station at Hammerwich. This station closed in 1965 and the line in 2002. Although the section to Brownhills and Walsall was closed in 1984.

Pipehill also has a former toll house on Walsall Road which is now in private ownership. The nearest churches is in Wall and Hammerwich.

== History ==
Pipehill was formerly a township in the parish of Lichfield St Michael, from 1866 Pipehill was a civil parish in its own right, in 1894 the parish was abolished and merged with Wall and Lichfield St Michael.

== Sources ==
- Townships: Wall with Pipehill | British History Online
- Pipehill, Staffordshire - genealogy heraldry and history
- Pipe Hill – Lichfield Lore
- Pipehill Fisheries
- Wall
