= Hilton Hotel (disambiguation) =

Hilton Hotel mainly refers to Hilton Hotels and Resorts, but also may refer to:

- Dallas Hilton, in Dallas, Texas, NRHP-listed
- Havana (Cuba) Hilton, now the Hotel Tryp Habana Libre
- London Hilton on Park Lane, Mayfair, London.
- Cactus Hotel, in San Angelo, Texas, NRHP-listed

== See also ==
- Hilton (disambiguation)
- Hilton House (disambiguation)
