= 1956 Campeonato Paulista =

Campeonato Paulista
- Season: 1956
- Champions: Santos
- Matches: 300
- Goals: 1,156 (3.85 per match)
- Top goalscorer: Zezinho (São Paulo) – 18 goals
- Biggest home win: Santos 9-1 Linense (September 26, 1956)
- Biggest away win: Nacional 0-5 Noroeste (December 2, 1956)
- Highest scoring: Santos 9-1 Linense (September 26, 1956); Linense 6-4 Portuguesa Santista (November 25, 1956)

The 1956 Campeonato Paulista da Primeira Divisão, organized by the Federação Paulista de Futebol, was the 55th season of São Paulo's top professional football league. Santos won the title for the third time. No teams were relegated and the top scorer was São Paulo's Zezinho with 18 goals.

== Championship ==
The championship was disputed in three phases:

- Qualifying round: All eighteen teams played each other in a single-round robin system, with the ten best teams advancing to the Blue Series and the eight worst going on to compete in the White Series.
- Blue Series: The ten teams played each other in a double round-robin system, and the team with the most points won the title.
- White Series: The eight teams played each other in a double round-robin system, and the team with the fewest points was relegated.

=== Qualifying phase ===
| Pos | Team | Pld | W | D | L | GF | GA | GD | Pts | Qualification or relegation |
|---|---|---|---|---|---|---|---|---|---|---|
| 1 | Santos | 17 | 13 | 4 | 0 | 51 | 16 | +35 | 30 | Blue Series |
| 2 | Corinthians | 17 | 14 | 1 | 2 | 54 | 28 | +26 | 29 | Blue Series |
| 3 | São Paulo | 17 | 12 | 1 | 4 | 56 | 24 | +32 | 25 | Blue Series |
| 4 | Portuguesa | 17 | 10 | 2 | 5 | 37 | 26 | +11 | 22 | Blue Series |
| 5 | Palmeiras | 17 | 9 | 3 | 5 | 30 | 18 | +12 | 21 | Blue Series |
| 6 | São Bento de São Caetano | 17 | 8 | 3 | 6 | 34 | 24 | +10 | 19 | Blue Series |
| 7 | XV de Piracicaba | 17 | 7 | 5 | 5 | 29 | 32 | −3 | 19 | Blue Series |
| 8 | XV de Jaú | 17 | 7 | 3 | 7 | 29 | 32 | −3 | 17 | Blue Series |
| 9 | Taubaté | 17 | 6 | 5 | 6 | 22 | 22 | 0 | 17 | Blue Series |
| 10 | Juventus | 17 | 7 | 2 | 8 | 32 | 31 | +1 | 16 | Blue Series |
| 11 | Ponte Preta | 17 | 6 | 3 | 8 | 27 | 28 | −1 | 15 | White Series |
| 12 | Noroeste | 17 | 6 | 2 | 9 | 22 | 36 | −14 | 14 | White Series |
| 13 | Ferroviária | 17 | 5 | 2 | 10 | 35 | 45 | −10 | 12 | White Series |
| 14 | Guarani | 17 | 4 | 4 | 9 | 26 | 39 | −13 | 12 | White Series |
| 15 | Jabaquara | 17 | 4 | 2 | 11 | 28 | 47 | −19 | 10 | White Series |
| 16 | Nacional | 17 | 2 | 6 | 9 | 17 | 40 | −23 | 10 | White Series |
| 17 | Portuguesa Santista | 17 | 3 | 3 | 11 | 20 | 39 | −19 | 9 | White Series |
| 18 | Linense | 17 | 3 | 3 | 11 | 27 | 55 | −28 | 9 | White Series |

Updated to match(es) played on September 30, 1956. Source: RSSSF.com
Rules for classification: 1) points; 2) goal difference; 3) wins; 4) number of goals scored.

=== Blue Series ===
| Pos | Team | Pld | W | D | L | GF | GA | GD | Pts | Qualification or relegation |
|---|---|---|---|---|---|---|---|---|---|---|
| 1 | Santos | 18 | 15 | 0 | 3 | 43 | 18 | +25 | 30 | Playoffs |
| 2 | São Paulo | 18 | 13 | 4 | 1 | 56 | 21 | +35 | 30 | Playoffs |
| 3 | Corinthians | 18 | 9 | 7 | 2 | 41 | 22 | +19 | 25 | |
| 4 | Palmeiras | 18 | 9 | 4 | 5 | 39 | 34 | +5 | 22 | |
| 5 | Portuguesa | 18 | 5 | 5 | 8 | 23 | 29 | −6 | 15 | |
| 6 | XV de Jaú | 18 | 6 | 2 | 10 | 23 | 43 | −20 | 14 | |
| 7 | XV de Piracicaba | 18 | 4 | 5 | 9 | 36 | 46 | −10 | 13 | |
| 8 | Juventus | 18 | 4 | 3 | 11 | 24 | 38 | −14 | 11 | |
| 9 | Taubaté | 18 | 3 | 5 | 10 | 23 | 41 | −18 | 11 | |
| 10 | São Bento de São Caetano | 18 | 1 | 7 | 10 | 25 | 41 | −16 | 9 | |

Updated to match(es) played on December 30, 1956. Source: RSSSF.com
Rules for classification: 1) points; 2) goal difference; 3) wins; 4) number of goals scored.

==== Playoffs ====
3 January 1957

| Santos | 4 – 2 | São Paulo |
|---|---|---|
| Feijó 20'; Tite 63'; Del Vecchio 68' 79' | Report | Zezinho 8' 42' |

Pacaembu, São Paulo
Attendance: 51,600
Referee: Erwin Hieger

=== White Series ===
| Pos | Team | Pld | W | D | L | GF | GA | GD | Pts |
|---|---|---|---|---|---|---|---|---|---|
| 1 | Noroeste | 14 | 10 | 1 | 3 | 43 | 20 | +23 | 21 |
| 2 | Ferroviária | 14 | 9 | 2 | 3 | 35 | 16 | +19 | 20 |
| 3 | Ponte Preta | 14 | 7 | 4 | 3 | 27 | 19 | +8 | 18 |
| 4 | Portuguesa Santista | 14 | 6 | 2 | 6 | 36 | 27 | +9 | 14 |
| 5 | Linense | 14 | 5 | 3 | 6 | 32 | 42 | −10 | 13 |
| 6 | Nacional | 14 | 5 | 0 | 9 | 28 | 41 | −13 | 10 |
| 7 | Guarani | 14 | 4 | 1 | 9 | 19 | 39 | −20 | 9 |
| 8 | Jabaquara | 14 | 3 | 1 | 10 | 22 | 38 | −16 | 7 |

Updated to match(es) played on February 10, 1957. Source: RSSSF.com
Rules for classification: 1) points; 2) goal difference; 3) wins; 4) number of goals scored.

=== Final standings ===
| Pos | Team | Pld | W | D | L | GF | GA | GD | Pts | Qualification or relegation |
|---|---|---|---|---|---|---|---|---|---|---|
| 1 | Santos | 35 | 28 | 4 | 3 | 94 | 34 | +60 | 60 | Champions |
| 2 | São Paulo | 35 | 25 | 5 | 5 | 112 | 42 | +70 | 55 | |
| 3 | Corinthians | 35 | 23 | 8 | 4 | 95 | 50 | +45 | 54 | |
| 4 | Palmeiras | 35 | 18 | 7 | 10 | 69 | 52 | +17 | 43 | |
| 5 | Portuguesa | 35 | 15 | 7 | 13 | 60 | 55 | +5 | 37 | |
| 6 | XV de Piracicaba | 35 | 11 | 10 | 14 | 67 | 74 | −7 | 32 | |
| 7 | XV de Jaú | 35 | 13 | 5 | 17 | 52 | 75 | −23 | 31 | |
| 8 | São Bento de São Caetano | 35 | 9 | 10 | 16 | 57 | 65 | −8 | 28 | |
| 9 | Taubaté | 35 | 9 | 10 | 16 | 45 | 63 | −18 | 28 | |
| 10 | Juventus | 35 | 11 | 5 | 19 | 55 | 69 | −14 | 27 | |
| 11 | Noroeste | 31 | 16 | 3 | 12 | 65 | 56 | +9 | 35 | |
| 12 | Ferroviária | 31 | 14 | 4 | 13 | 70 | 61 | +9 | 32 | |
| 13 | Ponte Preta | 31 | 13 | 7 | 11 | 54 | 47 | +7 | 33 | |
| 14 | Portuguesa Santista | 31 | 9 | 5 | 17 | 56 | 66 | −10 | 23 | |
| 15 | Linense | 31 | 8 | 6 | 17 | 59 | 97 | −38 | 22 | |
| 16 | Nacional | 31 | 7 | 6 | 18 | 45 | 81 | −36 | 20 | |
| 17 | Guarani | 31 | 8 | 5 | 18 | 45 | 78 | −33 | 21 | |
| 18 | Jabaquara | 31 | 7 | 3 | 21 | 50 | 85 | −35 | 17 | |

Updated to match(es) played on February 10, 1957. Source: RSSSF.com
Rules for classification: 1) points; 2) goal difference; 3) wins; 4) number of goals scored.

== Top Scores ==
| Rank | Player | Club | Goals |
|---|---|---|---|
| 1 | Zezinho | São Paulo | 30 |
| 2 | Paulo Carvoeiro | Corinthians | 29 |
| 3 | Gomes | Ferroviaría | 23 |
| 4 | Cláudio | Cortinhians | 22 |
| 5 | Edmur | Portuguesa | 19 |
| 6 | Aírton | Ponte Preta | 18 |
| 7 | Tite | Santos | 17 |
| 8 | Dino Sani | São Paulo | 14 |
