= Hilton Gomes (footballer) =

Brazilian footballer

Personal information
- Full name: Hilton Abreu Gomes
- Date of birth: 6 June 1935
- Place of birth: São Paulo, Brazil
- Date of death: 9 March 2002 (aged 66)
- Place of death: Araçatuba, Brazil
- Position: Forward

Youth career
- São Paulo

Senior career*
Years	Team	Apps	(Gls)
1953	São Paulo	9	(3)
1955–1956	Ferroviária		
- * Club domestic league appearances and goals as of 22 February 2024

Hilton Abreu Gomes (6 June 1935 – 9 March 2002), simply known as Hlton Gomes or Gomes, was a Brazilian professional footballer who played as a forward.

== Career ==
Revealed in São Paulo's youth categories, Gomes played for the club's professional team in 1953, playing 9 games and scoring 3 goals. He also played for Ferroviária in 1955 and 1956, where he scored 23 goals in the 1956 Campeonato Paulista, a record for the Araraquara club. He played for other clubs throughout his career, especially in football in the city of Araçatuba, where he died in 2002.

== Honours ==
Ferroviária

- Campeonato Paulista Série A2: 1955
