= Hilton Peak =

Mountain in the state of California

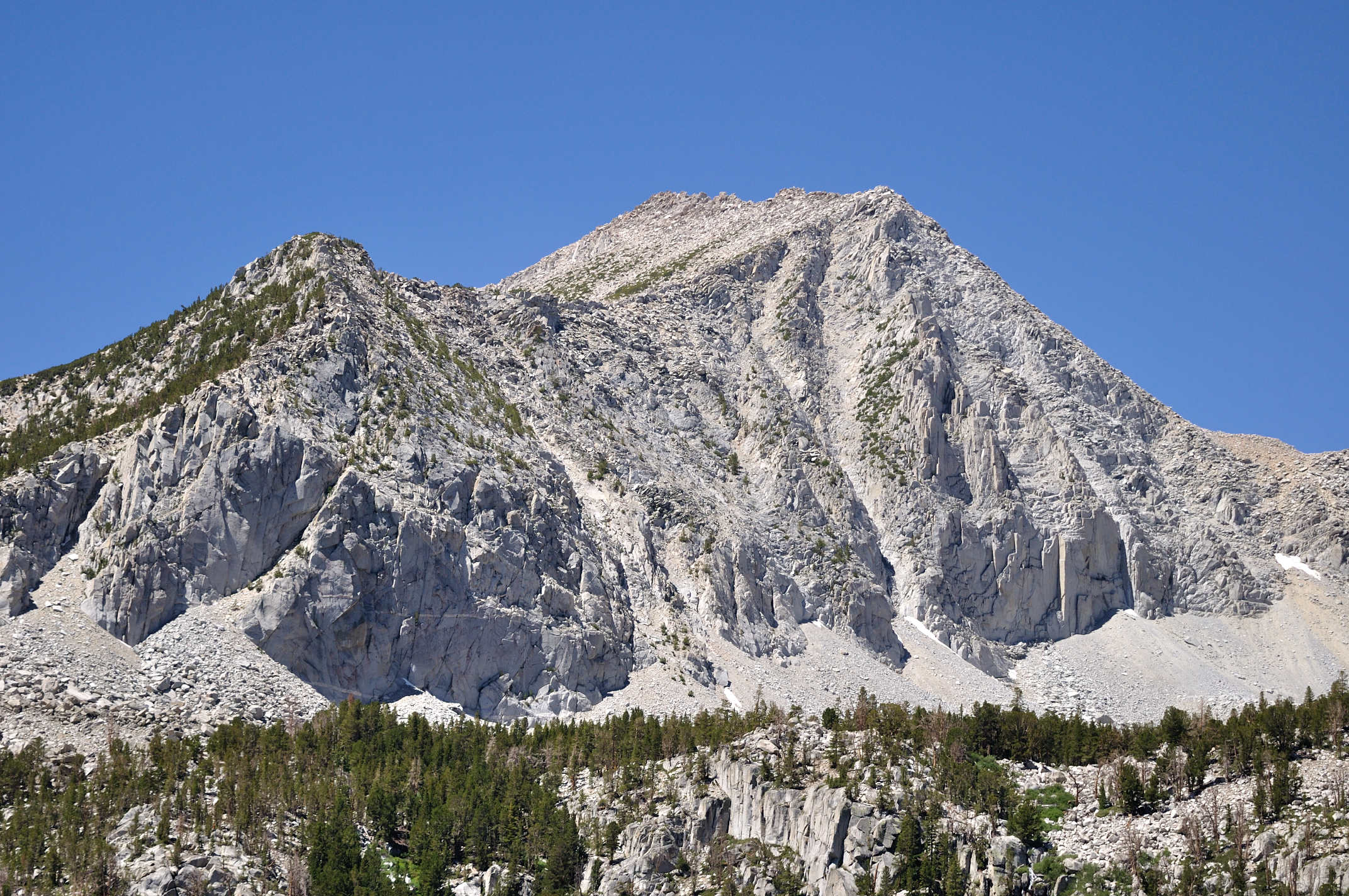
- Northeast aspect

Highest point
- Elevation: 12,531 ft (3,819 m)
- Prominence: 610 ft (186 m)
- Parent peak: Mount Morgan (13,016 ft)
- Isolation: 1.49 mi (2.40 km)
- Coordinates: 37°29′23″N 118°46′46″W

Geography
- Location within California Location within the United States
- Country: United States
- State: California
- County: Mono
- Protected area: John Muir Wilderness
- Parent range: Sierra Nevada
- Topo map: USGS Mount Abbot

Geology
- Rock age: Cretaceous
- Mountain type: Fault block
- Rock type: Granodiorite

Climbing
- Easiest route: Scrambling class 2+

Hilton Peak is a mountain in California, United States.

== Description ==
Hilton Peak is a 12,531-foot-elevation (3,819-meter) summit located in the Sierra Nevada mountain range in Mono County of California. It is situated above the Hilton Creek Lakes in the John Muir Wilderness, on land managed by Inyo National Forest. Topographic relief is significant as the summit rises approximately 2,680 feet (817 meters) above the Hilton Creek Lakes in 1.25 miles (2.01 km). Precipitation runoff from the mountain drains to Hilton Creek which empties into Lake Crowley. This landform's toponym has not been officially adopted by the U.S. Board on Geographic Names, however Hilton Creek Lakes and Hilton Creek are official names.

== Climate ==
According to the Köppen climate classification system, Hilton Peak is located in an alpine climate zone. Weather fronts originating in the Pacific Ocean travel east toward the Sierra Nevada mountains. As fronts approach, they are forced upward by the peaks (orographic lift), causing them to drop their moisture in the form of rain or snowfall onto the range.

== Gallery ==
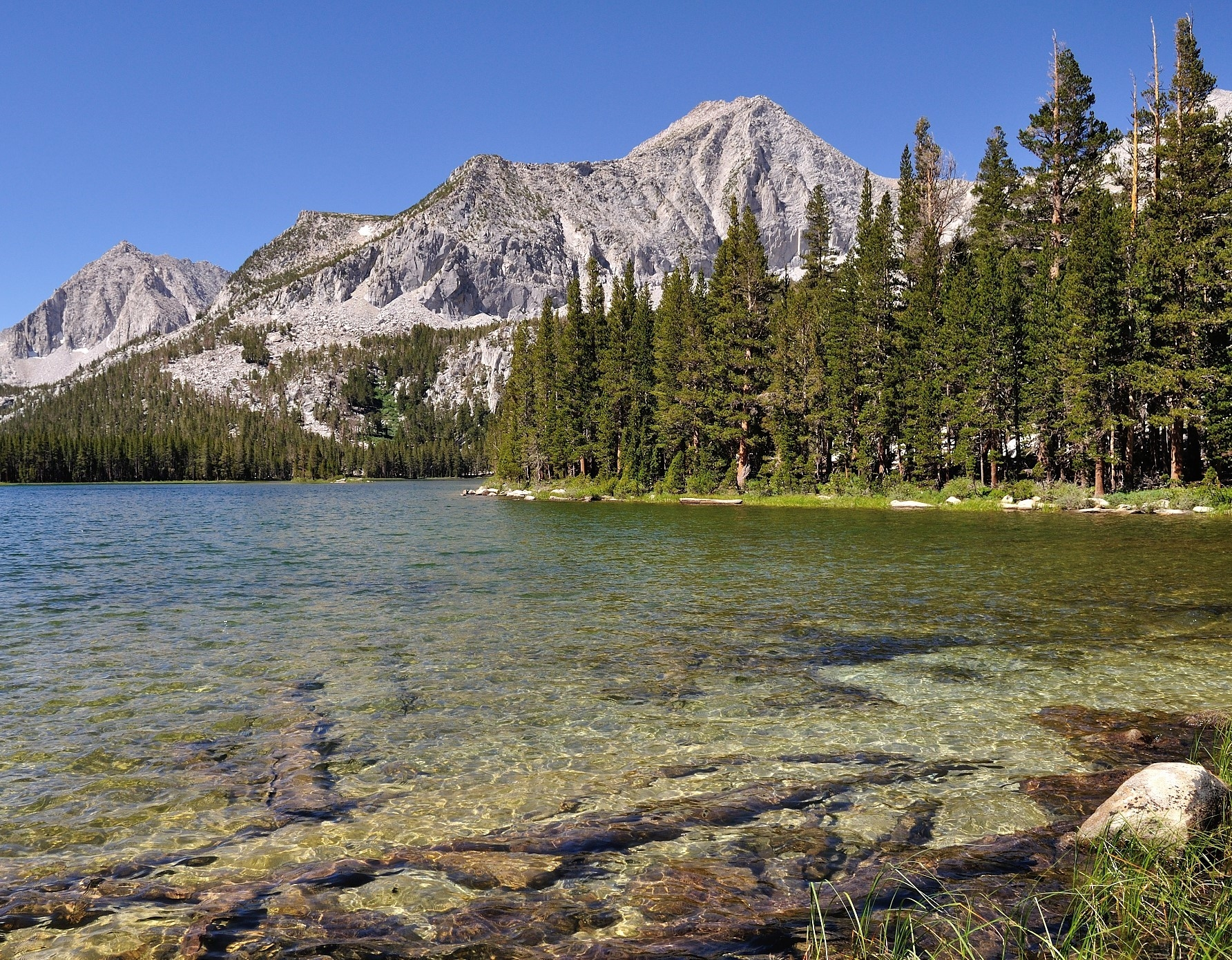
Hilton Peak viewed from Davis Lake

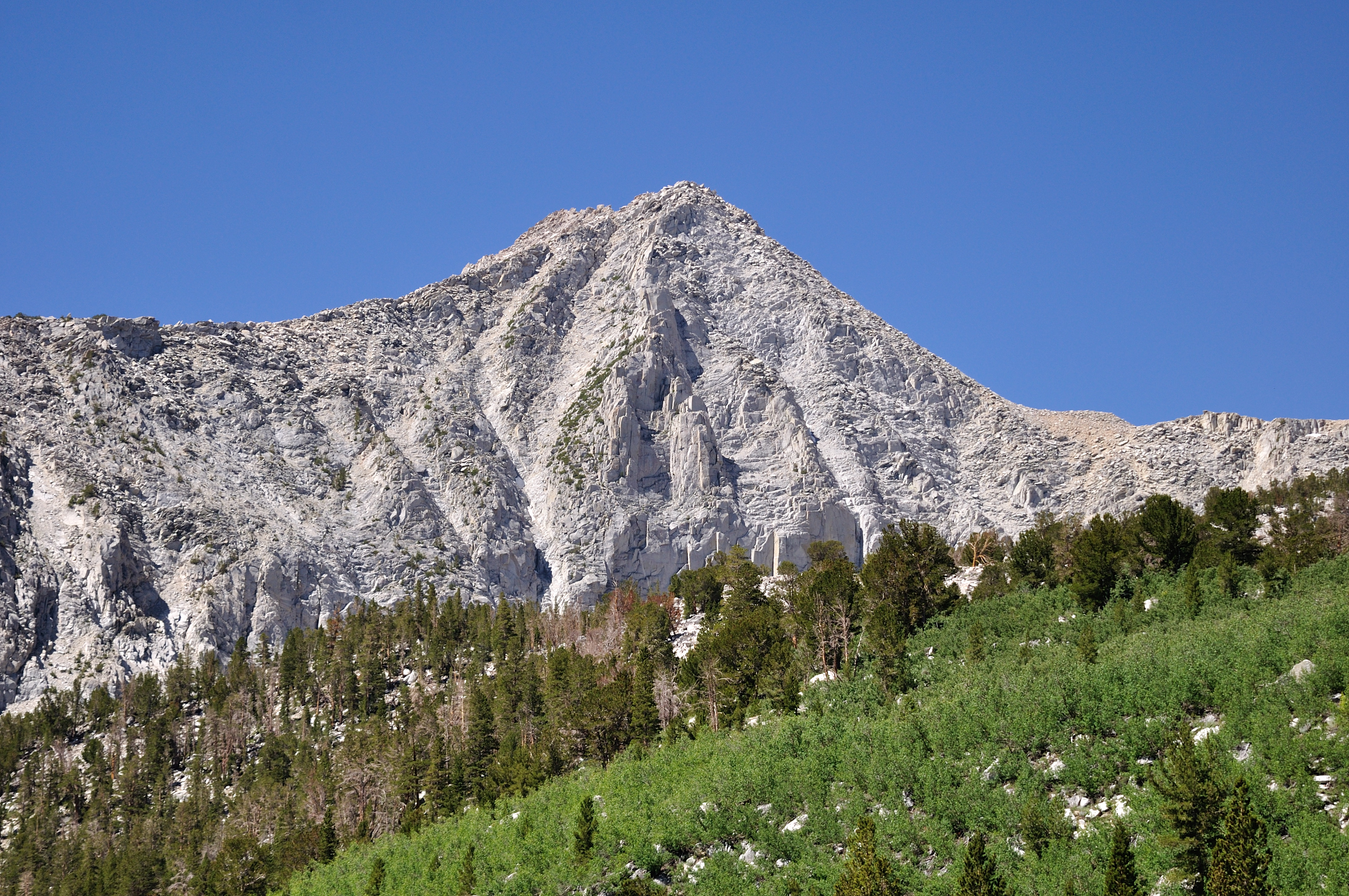
Northeast aspect

== See also ==
- List of mountain peaks of California
