= Hilton, Lichfield District =

Village in Staffordshire, England

Hilton
- Location within Staffordshire
- OS grid reference: SK 10630 59273
- Civil parish: Wall
- District: Lichfield
- Shire county: Staffordshire
- Region: West Midlands
- Country: England
- Sovereign state: United Kingdom
- Post town: Lichfield
- Postcode district: WS14
- Police: Staffordshire
- Fire: Staffordshire
- Ambulance: West Midlands
- UK Parliament: Tamworth

Hilton is a village in Staffordshire, England. It lies within the parish of Wall, about three miles from Lichfield. It is formed around two roads, Cranebrook Lane and Pouk Lane. The M6 Toll motorway, opened in 2003, passes through Hilton.

Two folk groups had their territories divided by highland, to the west of Hilton, the Pencersæte and Tomsæte, and Hilton is likely to have fallen within the territory occupied by the Tomsæte. According to Domesday Book, the minster that had been founded or re-founded at Wolverhampton by the lady Wulfrun, a Mercian noblewoman, in the 10th century held the vills of Ogley Hay and Hilton in this region, these estates almost interlocking with other vills held by Lichfield in 1086: Wyrley and Norton Canes.

The farmhouse at Barn Farm was an earlier barn, which was converted to a residential dwelling in 1901 and still contains parts of the former barn, such as the barn door hooks, which held the doors, upon its front.

== Geography ==
Geology

Hilton is underlain by Wildmoor Sandstone. Glaciofluvial deposits overlie the area.

Hydrology

Crane brook runs through Hilton and on to Chesterfield and is the source for Hilton's main road name of 'Cranebrook Lane'.
