= Hilton House (White Lake, South Dakota) =

United States historic place

- U.S. National Register of Historic Places
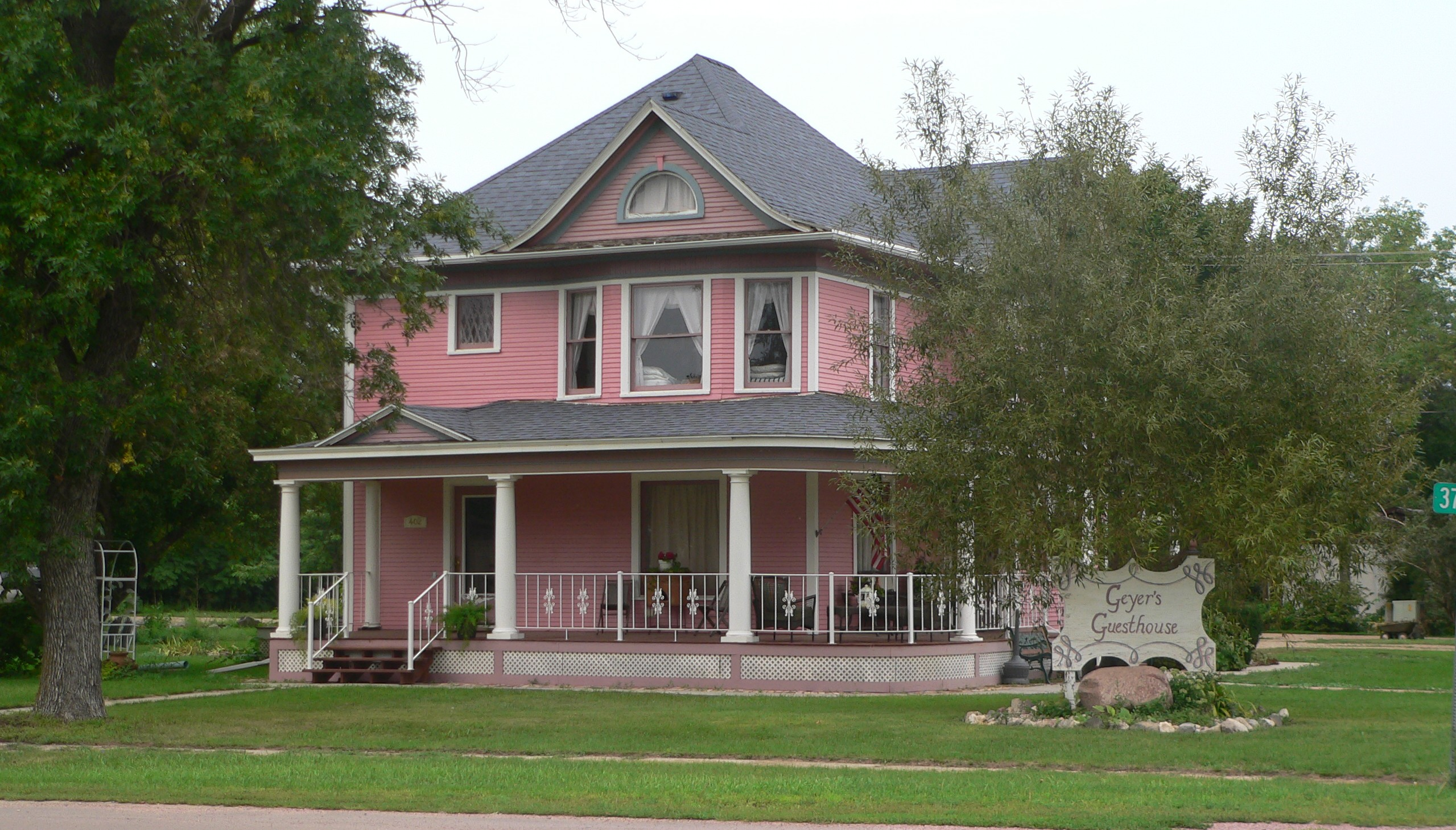

- Location within South Dakota Location within the United States
- Location: 402 N. Main St., White Lake, South Dakota
- Coordinates: 43.730638°N 98.713596°W
- Architectural style: Queen Anne
- NRHP reference No.: 00001352
- Added to NRHP: November 8, 2000

The Hilton House is an historic house in White Lake, South Dakota.

It is built in the Queen Anne architectural style. It was built ca. 1920, and added to the National Register of Historic Places in 2000. As of 2017, it was operated as the Geyer Guesthouse.
