= R. D. Hilton Smith =

English-born librarian

- Born: 1903; London, England
- Died: 1974 (aged 70–71)
- Occupations: Librarian, editor, and author

Robert Dennis Hilton Smith (1903–1974), often referred to as R. D. Hilton Smith, was an English-born librarian who emigrated to Canada where he worked as a librarian and then as a bookseller.

In 1937, he was the Borough Librarian in the Metropolitan Borough of Deptford, in south-east London, England, the editor of The Library Association Record and a Fellow of The Library Association (F.L.A.).

He was the deputy chief of the Toronto Public Library until the 1950s when he left to move to Victoria, British Columbia, and establish The Adelphi Book Shop Ltd. which was still operating in the period 1962–1973.

He wrote: "Canada's best and brightest end up retired in Victoria and bring with them fine libraries and collections - in fact in many cases they've written their own books. For the book lover there's a 100 years of treasures waiting to be found. (1961)"

R. D. Hilton Smith was once described as an antiquarian bookseller, a former Deputy Chief Librarian in the Toronto Public Libraries, and a consultant editor for the Encyclopedia Canadiana.

== Works written or edited by R. D. Hilton Smith ==
- editor "Library Buildings. Their Heating, Lighting and Decoration. Papers Read at the 55th Annual Conference of the Library Association.", London, January, 1933, author Gold, H. A., others
- Denmark (1936-1937), editor McColvin, L. R. "A Survey of Libraries", London, 1938.
- consultant editor, Encyclopedia Canadiana
- Canada (1959), editor Martin, Lowell A. "The Book of Knowledge Annual 1960", published by Grolier and Grolier of Canada, 1960.
- Canada (1960), editor Martin, Lowell A. "The Book of Knowledge Annual 1961", published by Grolier and Grolier of Canada, 1961.
- "Alice One Hundred: being a catalogue in celebration of the 100th birthday of Alice’s Adventures in Wonderland. Victoria.", published by The Adelphia Book Shop Ltd., Victoria, BC, Canada, 1966.
- Canada (1966), editor Martin, Lowell A. "The Book of Knowledge Annual 1967", published by Grolier and Grolier of Canada, 1967.
- "Northwestern Approaches: The First Century of Books", published by The Adelphi Book Shop Ltd., Victoria, B.C., Canada, 1969.
- Crusoe 250 (1970)
