= Hilton Mineiro =

Brazilian footballer

Personal information
- Full name: Hilton Martins Júnior
- Date of birth: 31 March 1980 (age 46)
- Place of birth: Salto da Divisa, Brazil
- Positions: Centre-back; defensive midfielder

Youth career
- –2000: São Paulo

Senior career*
Years	Team	Apps	(Gls)
2000–2002	São Paulo	1	(0)
2000	→ Santa Cruz (loan)		
2001	→ Inter de Limeira (loan)		
2001–2002	→ Paraná (loan)		
2003	Ceará		
2004	Paraná		
2005	Matonense		
2006	Shanghai Shenhua		
2007	União Barbarense		
2008	América-RN		
2008	Inter de Bebedouro		
2009	Itapirense		
2009	Iporá		
2009	Mixto		
2010	CRB		
2011	Taubaté		
2011	Tanabi		
2012	Nacional de Patos		
2012	Tanabi		
2012	Mixto		
2013	Democrata-SL		
2014	América-TO		
- * Club domestic league appearances and goals as of 23 November 2023

Hilton Martins Júnior (born 31 March 1980), better known as Hilton or Hilton Mineiro, is a Brazilian former professional footballer who played as a centre-back and defensive midfielder.

== Career ==
Revealed in the youth sectors of São Paulo FC, Hilton was part of the winning squad of the 2000 Copa SP de Futebol Jr. As a professional, Hilton was loaned to Santa Cruz for the Copa João Havelange. He participated in the champion squad of the 2001 Rio-São Paulo Tournament without acting, and later playing just a single match as a professional for São Paulo against EC Vitória in the Copa do Brasil.

He was later loaned to Inter de Limeira and Paraná Clube. In 2001 in Paraná, it became "Hilton Mineiro", as there was another player named Hilton in the squad (Vitorino Hilton). He played for several other teams in Brazil, but without repeating the success of his early career, ending his activities as a player in 2014.

== Honours ==
São Paulo

- Copa São Paulo de Futebol Jr.: 2000
- Torneio Rio-São Paulo: 2001
