= Mansio =

Official stopping place on a Roman road

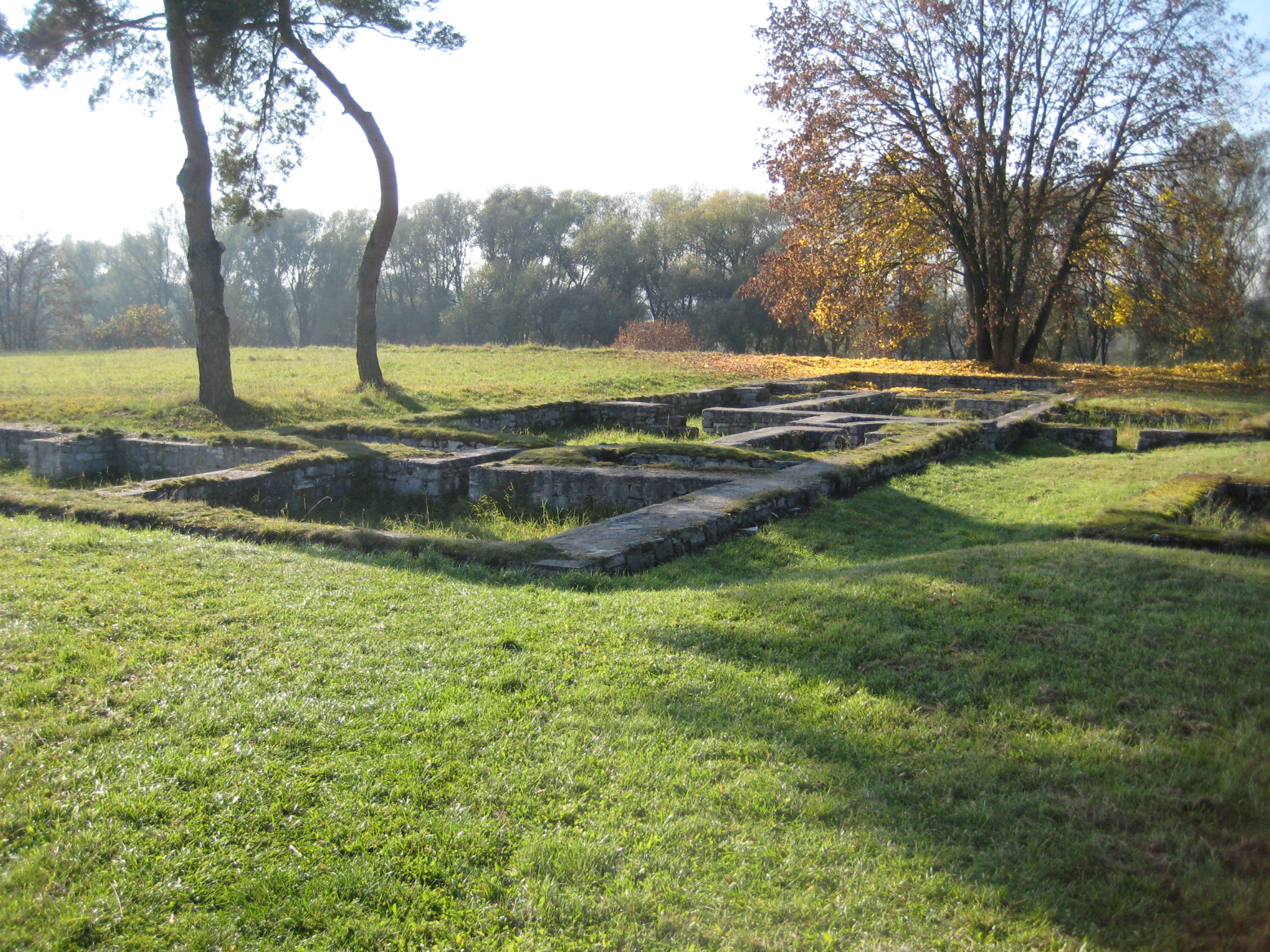
Foundation of Roman mansio at Eining, Germany

In the Roman Empire, a mansio (from the Latin word mansus, the perfect passive participle of manere "to remain" or "to stay") was an official stopping place on a Roman road, or via, maintained by the central government for the use of officials and those on official business while travelling.

== Background ==
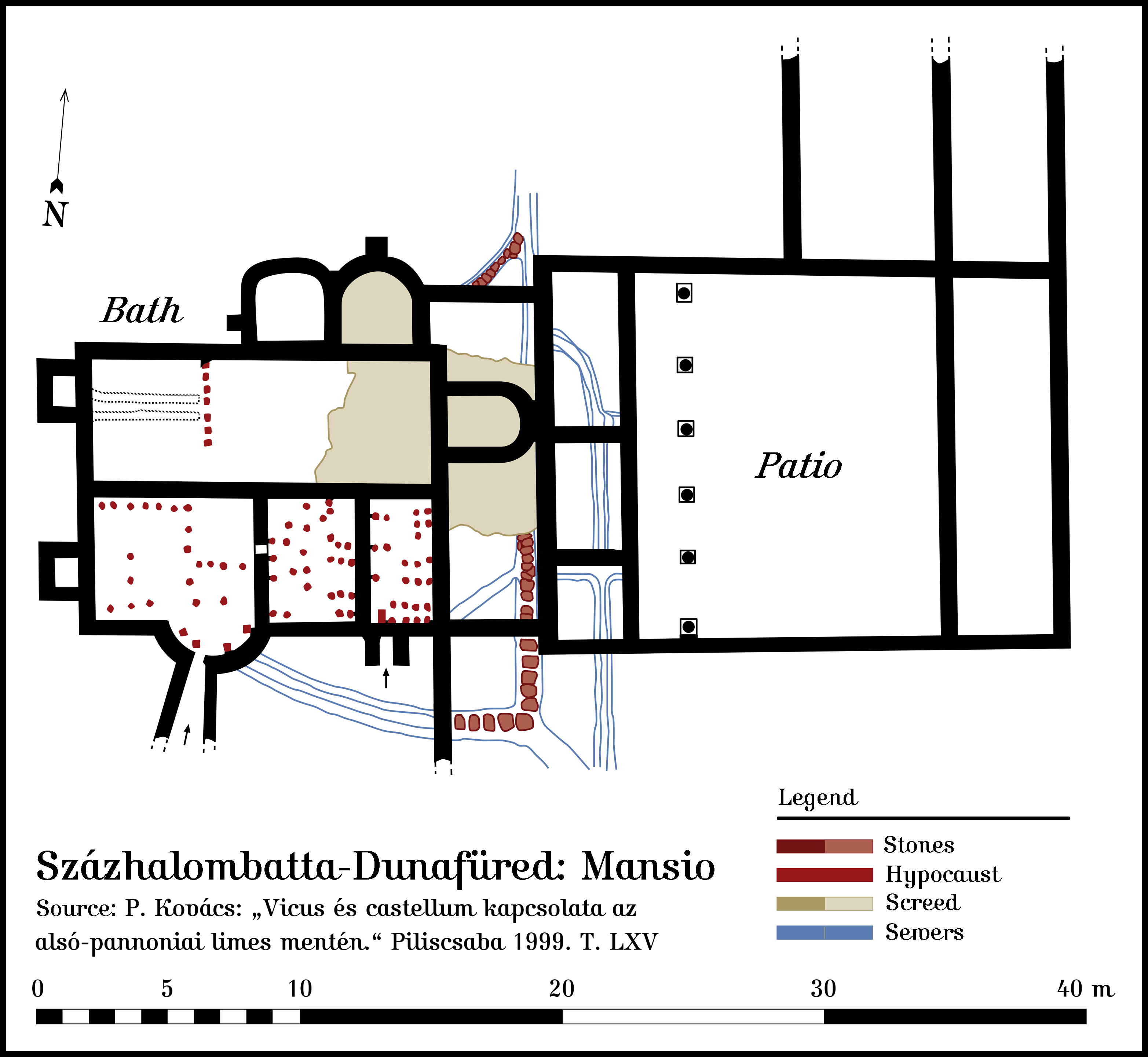
Plan of the fort Százhalombatta-Dunafüred (Matrica, Hungary): mansio

The roads which traversed the ancient world were later surveyed, developed and carefully maintained by the Romans, featuring purpose-built rest stops at regular intervals, known as castra. Probably originally established as simple places of military encampment, in process of time they included barracks and magazines of provisions (horrea) for the troops. Over time the need arose for a more sophisticated form of shelter for travelling dignitaries and officials. The Latin term mansio is derived from manere, signifying to pass the night at a place while travelling (the word is likely to be the source of the English word mansion, though their uses are entirely different). These substantial structures, normally in the form of a villa, were dedicated to the travellers' rest and refreshment. Guests were expected to provide a passport to identify themselves. In many cases infrastructure to sustain them sprang up around the mansio, but also the villas of provincial officials; Forts and ultimately even cities. Ox-drawn carts could travel about 30 km per day; pedestrians a little farther, so each mansio was about 25 kilometres (16 miles) to 30 kilometres (19 miles) from the next. At each mansio cisiarii kept gigs for hire and for conveying government dispatches (Cisium; Essedum). The Itinerarium Burdigalense, which is a road book drawn up in 333, mentions in order the mansiones from Bordeaux to Jerusalem with the intervening mutationes, and other, more considerable places, which are called either civitates, vici, or castella. The number of leagues or of miles between one place and another is also set down.

New mansio locations continue to be discovered and yield archaeological elements, e.g. in July 2024 a ring with the inscription "Roma" was discovered at a mansio near Coriglia close to Orvieto.

== Mansionarius or paramonarius ==
The mansio was under the superintendence of an officer called "mansionarius". As the bishops assumed control in the Christian West during the fifth and sixth centuries, the office of mansionarius developed new connotations. Mansionarius is inserted as a synonym of prosmonarius/paramonarius in canon 2 of the Fourth Ecumenical Council (451).

== Examples ==
=== Britannia ===
- Alfoldean, Slinfold, West Sussex (subject of a dig by archaeological television programme Time Team, 2006 series), one of a probable four mansiones on the route of Stane Street between London and Chichester
- Chelmsford
- Cunetio, Mildenhall, Wiltshire (Time Team, 2010)
- Dubris
- Godmanchester, Roman Mansio in Godmanchester
- Letocetum, Wall, Staffordshire
- Rutupiae
- Tripontium
- Iping

=== Other ===
- Little St Bernard Pass
- Le Mesnil
- Storgosia
- Tre Taverne
- Via Augusta

== Other types of way stations ==
Non-official travellers needed refreshment too, and different grades of facilities were available, often at the same locations as the mansiones.

=== Cauponae ===
A private system of cauponae were placed near the mansiones. They performed the same functions but were somewhat disreputable, as they were frequented by thieves and prostitutes. Graffiti decorated the walls of the few whose ruins have been found.

=== Tabernae ===
Genteel travellers needed something better than cauponae. In the early days of the viae, when little unofficial travel existed, houses placed near the road were required by law to offer hospitality on demand. Frequented houses no doubt became the first tabernae (Latin word "taberna" ("shed" or "hut"; from tabula, meaning "board"), which were hostels, rather than the "taverns" we know today. A tabernaculum or small taberna was a portable place of worship for the Hebrews, thus producing the word tabernacle.

As Rome grew, so did its tabernae, becoming more luxurious and acquiring good or bad reputations as the case may be. One of the best hostels was the Tabernae Caediciae at Sinuessa on the Via Appia. It had a large storage room containing barrels of wine, cheese and ham. Many cities of today grew up around a taberna complex, such as Rheinzabern in the Rhineland, and Saverne in Alsace.

=== Mutationes ===
A third system of way stations serviced vehicles and animals: the mutationes ("changing stations") (ἀλλαγαὶ). In these complexes, the driver could purchase the services of wheelwrights, cartwrights, and equarii medici, or veterinarians. Using these stations in chariot relays, the emperor Tiberius hastened 200 miles in 24 hours to join his brother, Drusus Germanicus, who was dying of gangrene as a result of a fall from a horse.

=== Stationes ===
Stationes are mostly known though the Antonine Itinerary and may be similar to mansiones.

== See also ==
- Roman Road System
- Tre Taverne
