= Peter A. Hilton House =

Historic house in New York, United States

- U.S. National Register of Historic Places
- Location within New York Location within the United States
- Nearest city: Beekman Corners, New York
- Coordinates: 42°44′30″N 74°35′24″W
- Area: 24 acres (9.7 ha)
- Built: ca. 1799
- Architectural style: Federal
- NRHP reference No.: 04001063
- Added to NRHP: September 24, 2004

Peter A. Hilton House is a historic home located at Beekman Corners in Schoharie County, New York. It was built about 1799 is a 2 1/2-story, five-bay, gable-roofed brick residence in the Federal style. A gable-roofed, 1 1/2-story brick kitchen wing projects from the rear. Also on the property is a Dutch barn (ca 1800), horse barn (c. 1835), and pig / sheep barn (c. 1850).

It was listed on the National Register of Historic Places in 2004.
