= Hilton (Columbus, Georgia) =

Historic house in Georgia, United States

- U.S. National Register of Historic Places
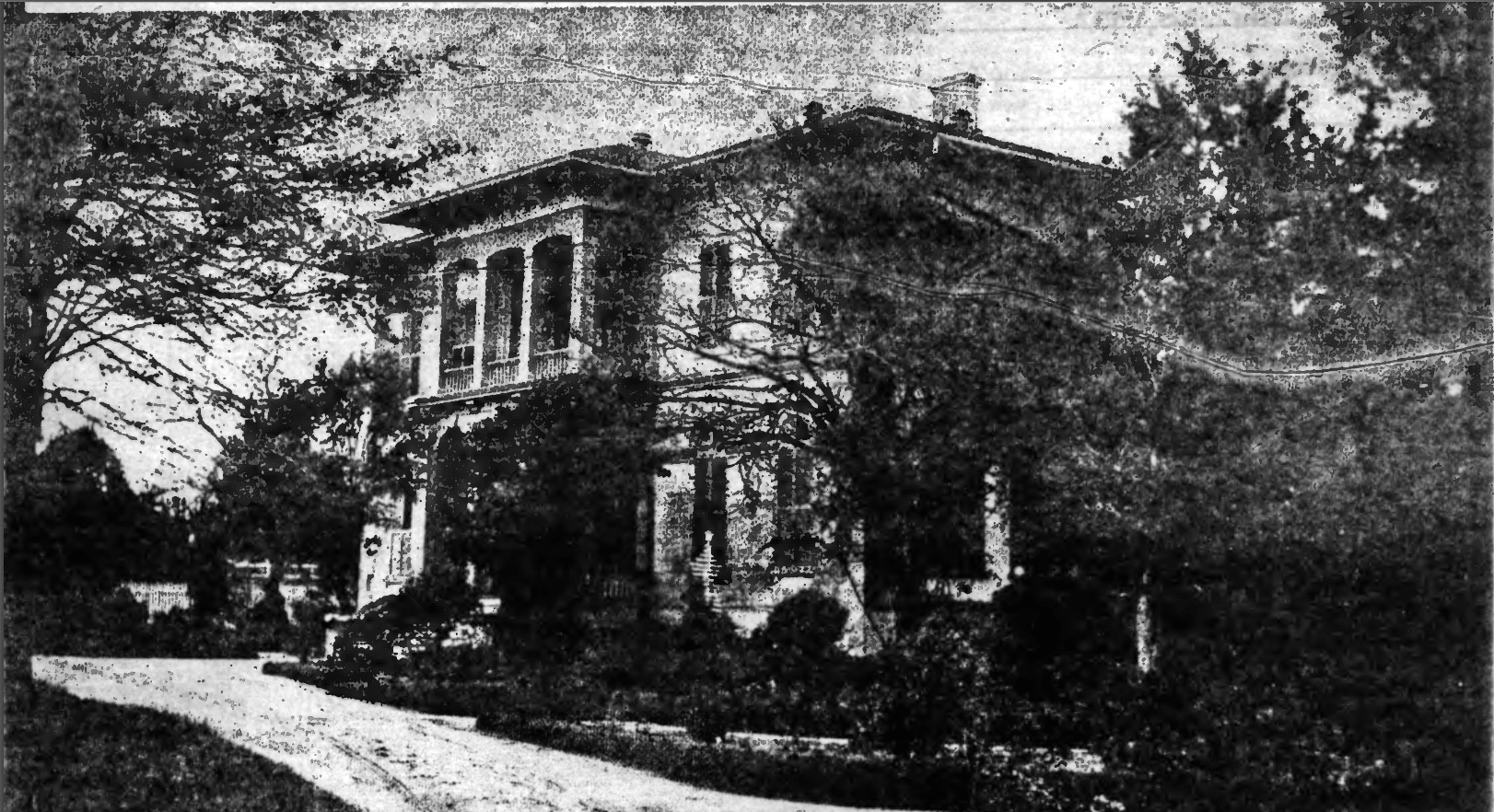
- The house in 1897

- Location within Georgia Location within the United States
- Location: 2505 Macon Rd., Columbus, Georgia
- Coordinates: 32°28′24″N 84°57′14″W
- Area: 6 acres (2.4 ha)
- Built: 1843
- Architectural style: Italian Villa
- NRHP reference No.: 72000390
- Added to NRHP: January 20, 1972

Hilton in Columbus, Georgia was built in 1843 for Dr. Lovick Pierce, who bought the land in 1838. It was built as a "comfortable" four-room house on its own city block, with a driveway avenue of cedar trees leading to it from Macon Road.

He was a medical doctor in Philadelphia and became a Methodist minister.

It was listed on the National Register of Historic Places in 1972. The NRHP listing included 6 acres (2.4 ha) with two contributing buildings.

Its architecture is described as "Italian Villa" style, which may relate to Italianate architecture.

The house was restored in 1936.
