= Aldridge School =

Location
- Tynings Lane; Aldridge, West Midlands, WS9 0BG; England; 52.597821°N 1.925483°W

Information
- Type: Academy
- Local authority: Walsall
- Department for Education URN: 137974 Tables
- Ofsted: Reports
- Headmaster: Barry Worth
- Gender: Coeducational
- Age: 11 to 18
- Enrollment: 1559
- Website: http://www.aldridge.walsall.sch.uk/

Aldridge School is a mixed secondary school and sixth form with academy status located in Aldridge, in the Metropolitan Borough of Walsall in the West Midlands, England. As of September 2022 Barry Worth has served as headmaster.

== History ==
Aldridge School was established in 1975 through the merger of Aldridge Grammar School and Tynings County Secondary Modern School. Aldridge Grammar School opened in September 1959 as an 11-18 selective school under the name Aldridge Grammar-Technical School.

== School structure ==
=== House system ===
Pupils are assigned to one of four houses—Barr, Daniels, Linley and Scott—when they join the school. Each house has around 360 pupils.

== Awards and recognition ==
In September 2003, Aldridge School became a Science College.

The school's 2017 Ofsted inspection rated it Good.

== Notable alumni ==
=== Aldridge Grammar School ===
- Stuart William Peach, Baron Peach, former Chief of the Defence Staff (2016–2018)

=== Aldridge School ===
- Ellie Simmonds, swimmer
- Jorja Smith, singer-songwriter
- Tom Davies, YouTuber
- Lee Sinnott, footballer
- Richard Sinnott, actor
- Richard Taundry, footballer
- Rachel Unitt, footballer
- Martyn Bennett, footballer
- Jamie Pardington, footballer

== Former headteachers ==
First headmaster was Eric Ioan Emlyn Whitman, who served for 15 years until his retirement in July 1974
