= Tori James =

Welsh mountain climber (born 1981)

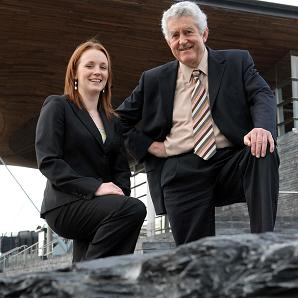
James with First Minister of Wales Rhodri Morgan in 2007

Tori James (born 10 December 1981) was the first Welsh woman to climb Mount Everest, at the age of 25, making her the youngest British woman to complete the ascent.

== Career ==
Tori James is a published author, a motivational speaker and consultant delivering leadership training and team and youth development projects. She lives in Cardiff.

In June 2014, she was part of the Beeline Britain team who became the first to travel in a straight line mission from Land's End to John O'Groats in aid of BLESMA (the British Limbless Ex-Servicemen’s Association).

James carries out motivational training for corporate and charitable organisations in sectors including aviation, entrepreneurship and sport. She is an ambassador for the Duke of Edinburgh’s Award in Wales, Girl Guiding UK and the Visit Wales Year of Adventure 2016.

In May 2026 James was named as an ambassador for the National Centre for Learning Welsh as part of their Learn Welsh Ambassadors Scheme.

== Works ==
- Peak Performance. Accent Press. 2013. ISBN 9781908917553.
