= Birlec =

Birlec Ltd.
- Industry: Furnaces
- Founded: 1927 as Birmingham Electric Furnace Company
- Fate: Takeover by GEC in 1967

Birlec Ltd. was an English manufacturer of industrial electric furnaces. Birlec was founded in 1927, as the Birmingham Electric Furnace Company, establishing a factory at Tyburn Road, Erdington, Birmingham. In 1954, Birlec's owner the Mond Nickel Company sold the company to Associated Electrical Industries. As part of its expansion plans, AEI relocated Birlec to a new factory at Aldridge, Staffordshire during the late 1950s. Some of the largest electric arc furnaces produced by Birlec had a smelting capacity of over 100 tons. Birlec along with the rest of AEI, was taken over by GEC in 1967.
