= Ethel Lote =

British World War II nurse and yoga instructor (1920–2024)

- Born: Ethel Nutting; 28 November 1920; Walsall Wood, Staffordshire, England
- Died: 11 June 2024 (aged 103)
- Spouse: Albert Lote (m. 1945; died 2002)
- Children: 2

Ethel Lote (née Nutting; 28 November 1920 – 11 June 2024) was a British World War II nurse and yoga instructor. After the war, she became a dental nurse and founded the Dental Nurses Society.

== Early life ==
Ethel Nutting was born on 28 November 1920 in Walsall Wood, Staffordshire. Her father was a coal miner while her mother was a music teacher. Lote had always aspired to be a nurse, inspired by her mother, Ellen Cross, who served as a nurse in London during World War I.

She joined St John Ambulance while she was still at school as well as working as a first aider at the local Crabtree electrical factory on Saturdays. She left school aged 14 to work in a leather factory. When she was 17, Lote became a probationary nurse.

== Career ==
Lote worked as an ARP volunteer before the beginning of World War II and subsequently joined the Civil Nursing Reserve as a nursing auxiliary when it was founded in 1939.

During the war, Lote was based at Burntwood Military Hospital, a collection of ten huts each containing forty beds located in the grounds of a psychiatric hospital, where she worked 12-hour shifts. The hospital received the first convoy of evacuated soldiers from Dunkirk, Lote later remembered "they were still in the uniforms, just how they had been picked up from the beaches. We had the first 100 patients. It was terrible, I'd just started training as a nurse, to see these men and their injuries, a lot of them were burned or had shrapnel wounds."

When invited by a doctor to witness an autopsy to further her medical knowledge, she encountered Albert Lote, a superintendent with St John Ambulance after the lights failed during an air raid. While they both held a candle for the doctor to inspect the corpse, she recalled "we looked across the body at each other and as we looked into each other's eyes, we fell in love". They got engaged in October 1939, with the wedding originally scheduled for February 1940 or 1941, however Albert was called up into the Royal Navy and served abroad for five years, during which they did not see each other. They eventually married on 10 March 1945 during one of Albert's brief leaves. Ethel arrived late for the wedding as she had just finished a night shift.

After the war, the Lotes moved to Aldridge, where Ethel became a health visitor and then a dental nurse.

== Later life ==
Whilst on a training course, Lote accidentally walked into a yoga lecture. Intrigued, she researched into it and then decided to join the All India Board of Yoga. She began teaching yoga classes in the 1960s. In the 1990s, Lote also began learning tai chi and started to run classes combining the two. Lote officially retired from teaching classes when she was 88, but continued practicing yoga and tai chi until she was 95, when she fractured her femur and could no longer get her foot over the back of her neck.

She celebrated her 100th birthday in November 2020, and attributed her longevity to her practice of yoga and tai chi. Lote also received letters from Elizabeth II and Sophie, Duchess of Edinburgh upon reaching the milestone.

Lote died on 11 June 2024, at the age of 103. She was survived by her two sons. Her husband Albert died in 2002.
