= Ferguson, Pailin & Co =

English electrical engineering company

Ferguson, Pailin & Co.
- Industry: Electrical engineering
- Founded: 1913; 113 years ago
- Founders: Samuel Ferguson; George Pailin
- Defunct: 1960
- Fate: Merged into Associated Electrical Industries
- Headquarters: Manchester, England
- Products: Electrical switchgear

Ferguson, Pailin & Co. was an English electrical engineering company based in Higher Openshaw, Manchester. The company was established in 1913, by Samuel Ferguson and George Pailin to manufacture electrical switchgear.

The company acquired Mottram Hall to give employees an opportunity to go on affordable holidays during World War II. The company bought three properties in 1939/40 in order to provide holidays for staff and workers during the war. Mottram Hall was bought for the works, a small hotel in Llandudno for the middle level staff and a property in Criccieth for senior staff. Mottram Hall was sold as surplus to requirements by GEC in 1968 and is now a luxury country house hotel.

The company was acquired by Associated Electrical Industries (AEI) in 1928. Following the restructuring of AEI in 1960, Ferguson, Pailin & Co ceased to be a separate subsidiary and was merged into AEI switchgear. Following the takeover of AEI by GEC in 1967, the Higher Openshaw works became part of GEC Switchgear. In 1989, GEC merged its electrical engineering interests with those of Alsthom to form GEC Alsthom. The factory was later closed by Alstom in 2003, with most of the employees finishing on 22 November 2002. The main business was transferred to ALSTOM POWER in Stafford, Lichfield Road. The After Sales business of ALSTOM Transmission & Distribution (T&D) looking after all the spares, repairs and the extensions to all the legacy switchgear products i.e. BVP17, VMX, MX36, MX51, MX81, HMX36, HWX, HWX A, HMC1072, HMC1172 & VISAX was transferred to Frederick Road, Salford, the old Norweb building. In January 2004 ALSTOM sold the business to AREVA T&D a French owned company. In June 2008 the After Sales business was moved to Cavendish Place on the Birchwood Park estate near Warrington. In January 2011 AREVA T&D was sold to Schneider Electric. The main business that was originally transferred to Stafford is now a part of the main switchgear business at the Schneider Electric, Jack Lane factory in Leeds.

The original factory building on Buckley Street was knocked down some years ago. Now a Morrisons superstore. The main factory off Edge Lane was also demolished in 2022 to make way for a new housing development (Lovell).
