= Aldridge =

Town in West Midlands County, England

Coordinates: 52.606°N 1.91787°W

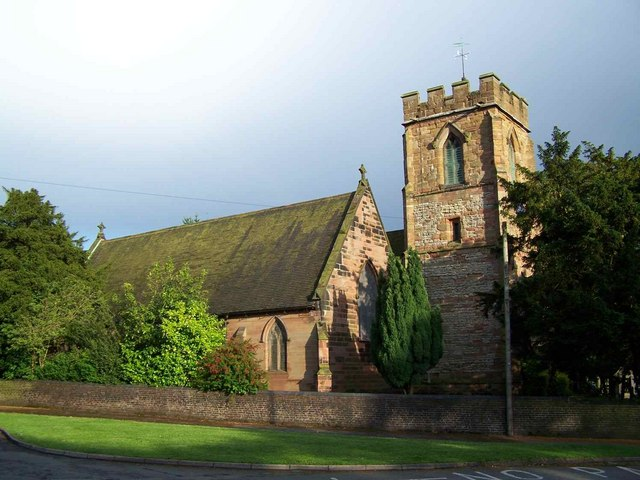
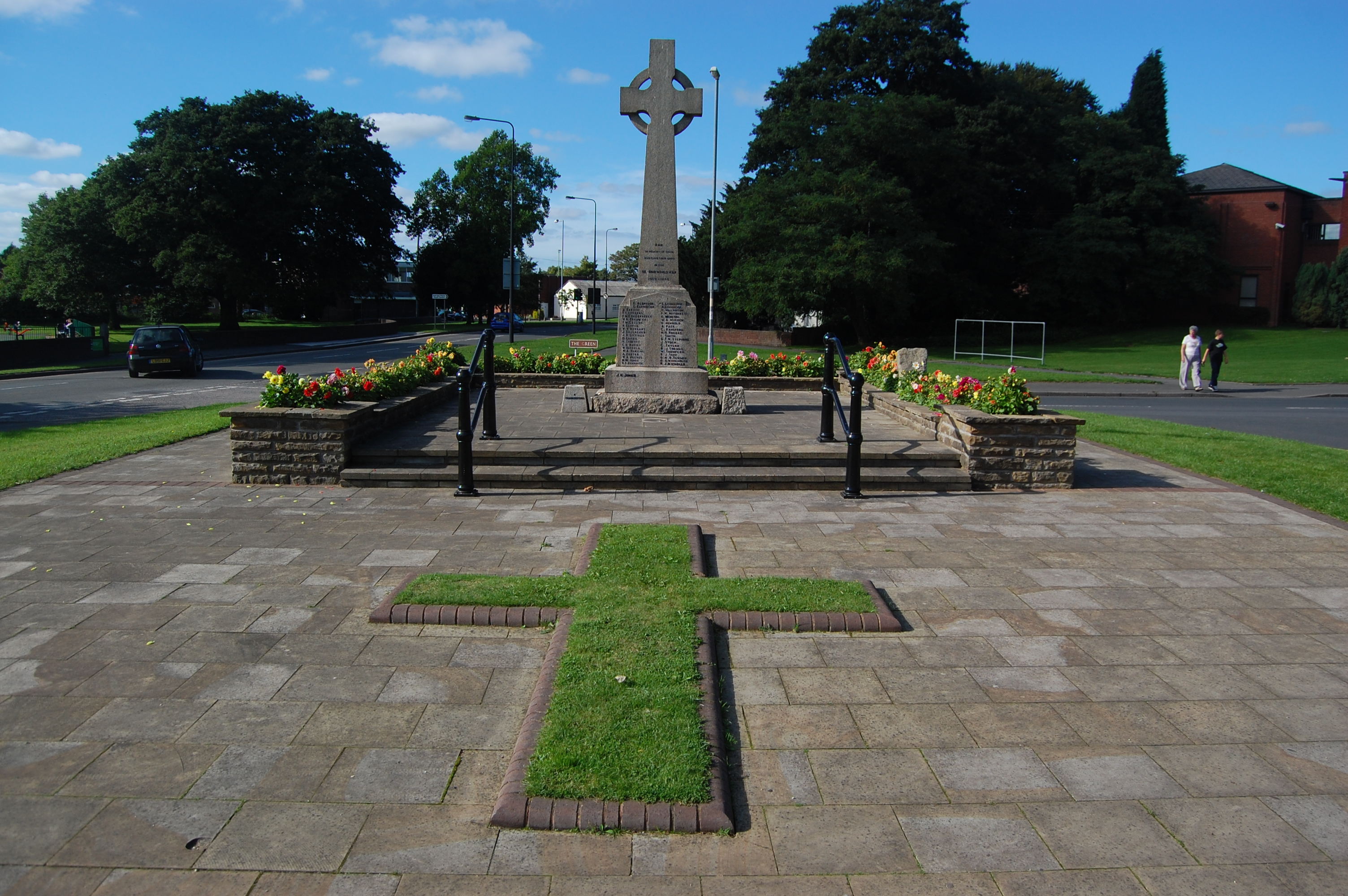
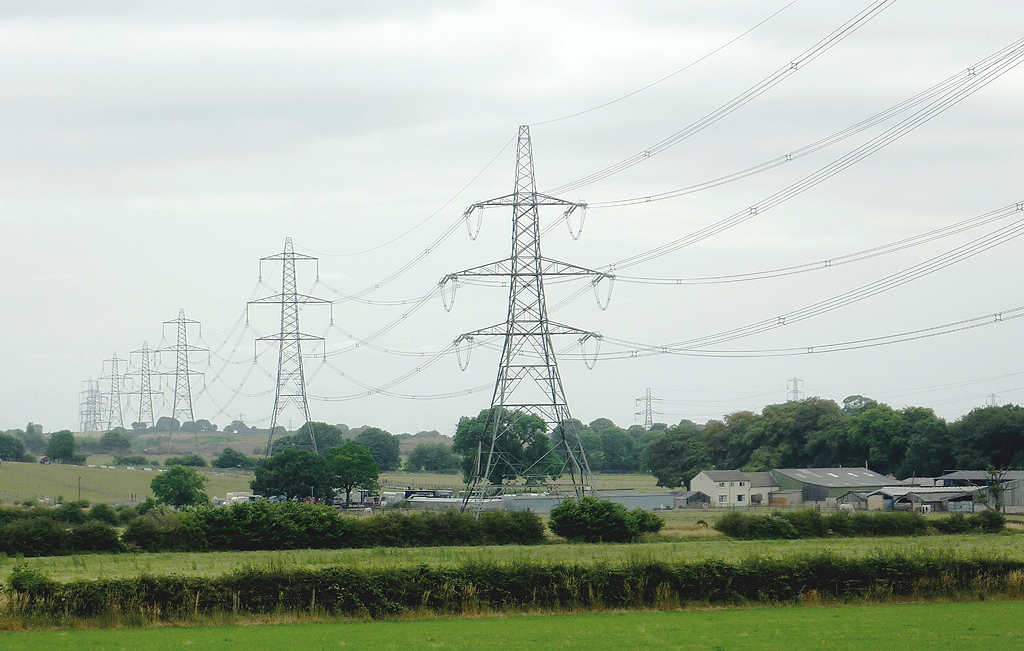
- From top, left to right: Aldridge St Mary's Church, War Memorial, rural area with pylons and farmland

- Location within the West Midlands
- Population: 15,835 (2021 census)
- OS grid reference: SK056009
  - London: 128 mi (206 km) SE
- Metropolitan borough: Walsall
- Metropolitan county: West Midlands
- Region: West Midlands
- Country: England
- Sovereign state: United Kingdom
- Areas of the town: List: Druids Heath; Mill Green; Pool Green; Rushall (part); Shelfield (part); Streetly (part); Stubbers Green; Walsall Wood (part)
- Post town: Walsall
- Postcode district: WS9
- Dialling code: 01543, 01922
- Police: West Midlands
- Fire: West Midlands
- Ambulance: West Midlands
- UK Parliament: Aldridge-Brownhills

Aldridge is a town in the Metropolitan Borough of Walsall in the West Midlands, England. It was historically a village, which was part of Staffordshire until 1974. The town is three miles (five kilometres) from Brownhills, five miles (eight kilometres) from Walsall, six miles (ten kilometres) from Sutton Coldfield and seven miles (eleven kilometres) from Lichfield.

== History ==
The name "Aldridge" is derived from the Anglo-Saxon alr or alre + wīc meaning 'alder (tree) + village'. Another suggestion is that the name "Aldridge" means "outlying farm among alder-trees", from the Old English alor and wīc. It was recorded as Alrewic in the Domesday Book of 1086 when it was valued at 15 shillings and had a population of seven households; the Lord was Robert (d'Oilly) and the tenant-in-chief was William son of Ansculf. The name was recorded as Alrewich and Allerwych in the 12th century.

Aldridge began as a small agricultural settlement, with farming being the most common occupation up until the 19th century.

In the 1800s, Aldridge became an industrial town with coal mines and lime kilns. The coal and clay in the area prompted many to set up collieries and brickworks. Aldridge clay is especially useful in the manufacture of blue bricks. The 1881 census shows that the mines and brickworks were major employers. Because the coal and clay beneath the eastern side of Aldridge (towards Stonnall) is located much deeper under the surface, extraction of this coal and clay would not have been economically viable. As a result, farms continued to dominate the eastern part, though a sand quarry was set up and remains on Birch Lane.

Nineteenth and early twentieth century Ordnance Survey maps show an area named Pool Green to the south of Aldridge, across the railway line from Aldridge railway station. A large pool was drained and filled in when the railway line was constructed. Pool Green may have been the site of a Saxon settlement, though no finds have been reported and the area has since been redeveloped.

During the 20th century, modern shops were built in the centre of Aldridge, as well as council buildings. During the Second World War, the small Aldridge Airport was used for military planes. It was subsequently used for passenger services for a time.

Aldridge became an urban district in Staffordshire in 1934. As well as the parish of Aldridge the urban district contained the parishes of Great Barr, Pelsall and Rushall. Other villages within the district included Walsall Wood, Clayhanger and Streetly. These areas began to grow substantially with private house buildings from the 1930s, mostly bought by families relocating from the central areas of Walsall.

The urban district of Aldridge merged with Brownhills on 1 April 1966 to form Aldridge-Brownhills, parts also went to the County Borough of West Bromwich, Lichfield Rural District, Cannock Urban District, the County Borough of Walsall and the County Borough of Birmingham. On 1 April 1966 the parish was also abolished to form "Aldridge Brownhills", parts also went to Birmingham, Shenstone, Walsall and West Bromwich. In 1961 the parish had a population of 51,046. It then became part of an expanded Metropolitan Borough of Walsall in 1974.

== Demographics ==
At the 2021 census, the Aldridge contiguous built-up area had a population of 15,835.

For electoral purposes, the town is divided between the wards of Aldridge North & Walsall Wood and Aldridge Central & South, which also cover neighbouring areas surrounding the town. At the 2021 census, the populations of these wards were 13,157 and 13,739 respectively.

Ethnicity at the 2021 census
Ethnic group	Aldridge North and Walsall Wood		Aldridge Central and South	
Ethnic group	Population	%	Population	%
White	12,023	91.4%	12,293	89.5%
Asian, Asian British or Asian Welsh	499	3.8%	792	5.8%
Mixed or Multiple	321	2.4%	333	2.4%
Black, Black British, Black Welsh, Caribbean or African	230	1.7%	216	1.6%
Other Ethnic Group	82	0.6%	106	0.8%
Total	13,155	100%	13,740	100%

Religious composition at the 2021 census
Religion	Aldridge North and Walsall Wood		Aldridge Central and South	
Religion	Population	%	Population	%
Christian	7,382	59.3%	8,151	62.6%
Irreligious	4,512	36.2%	4,024	30.9%
Sikh	251	2%	467	3.6%
Muslim	157	1.3%	154	1.2%
Hindu	74	0.6%	138	1.1%
Other religion	57	0.5%	51	0.4%
Buddhist	21	0.3%	30	0.3%
Jewish	1	0.1%	3	0.1%
Total	13,157	100%	13,739	100%

== Politics ==
The Aldridge-Brownhills constituency is a safe seat for the Conservative Party. Re-elected at the 2024 general election, the Member of Parliament (MP) is Wendy Morton, first elected in 2015. Her predecessor, Sir Richard Shepherd, had held the seat since 1979.

Aldridge is made up of two council wards: Aldridge Central & South, and Aldridge North & Walsall Wood. Each ward elects three councillors to Walsall Metropolitan Borough Council. Following the May 2026 local elections, Aldridge Central and South has two Conservative councillors (Tim Wilson and John Murray) and one from Reform UK (Lucy Darby). Aldridge North & Walsall Wood has two Reform UK councillors (Lesley Lynch and Ian Benton) and one Conservative (Christine Edwards).

== Suburban areas ==
Named suburban areas of or near to Aldridge include Barr Common and Leighswood.

Leighswood, north of the town centre, is mostly a mix of residential, industrial and commercial estates. Leighswood Primary School serves the area. It is also home to the Aldridge Transport Museum on Northgate. Leigh's Wood is a Local Nature Reserve and Site of Importance for Nature Conservation comprising a woodland of mainly birch and oak, and a wildlife pond.

== Education ==
Primary schools are Cooper and Jordan Church of England Primary School, Leighswood, St Mary of the Angels (Roman Catholic), and Whetstone Field. Redhouse Primary School closed in 2006. Secondary schools are Aldridge School and St Francis of Assisi Catholic College.

== Industry and commerce ==
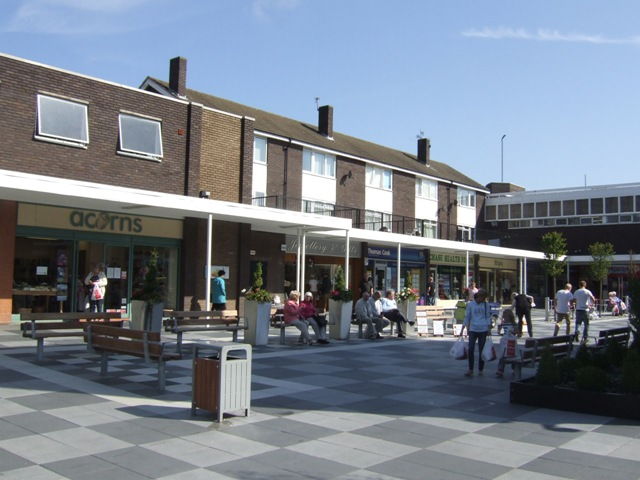
Aldridge shopping centre

In Aldridge, there are several factories with several large industrial estates in the area. Some of the most notable factories include the large Ibstock and Weinberger brickworks, and the GKN Driveshafts factory, although the latter company closed in recent years due to relocation and cheaper imports. Birlec, a manufacturer of industrial furnaces relocated to Aldridge in the late 1950s, but has since closed. Aldridge Plastics Ltd, a plastics injection moulder, was set up in the town in 1968 and continued trading for almost 40 years before ceasing production in 2007. From January 2011, GFP Engineering Ltd, a Glass Reinforced Plastic (GRP) moulding company, will commence trading after relocating from nearby Lichfield. There is also a marina, Aldridge Marina, offering facilities for canal boat moorers.

Most of the town's shops are located either on High Street, Anchor Road, or in the shopping area known as "The Parade". A purpose-built Safeway (UK) opened in 1992 and started operating as a Morrisons in 2004. One of the oldest traders in Aldridge is R.H.N. Riley Insurances on Anchor Road, they have been trading since 1957 and in Aldridge since about 1970. Also in the area is a Wetherspoons Public House, in the former Avion cinema, latterly a bingo hall. Many of its original features have been retained including the protected facade.

== Transport ==
Many of the buses in Aldridge were renumbered in April 2010 as part of Centro's attempt to simplify bus services in and around the Walsall area. Some subsidised services have changed operators over time, such as 25 previously operated by Arriva, iGo, and Diamond.

As of July 2024 operating services through Aldridge include - Walsall Community Transport (25), Chaserider (36, 36A), and West Midlands Bus (6, 7, 937, 997). These services operate to surrounding estates each terminating at Walsall, Birmingham, Sutton Coldfield, Brownhills, Kingstanding, and Lichfield.

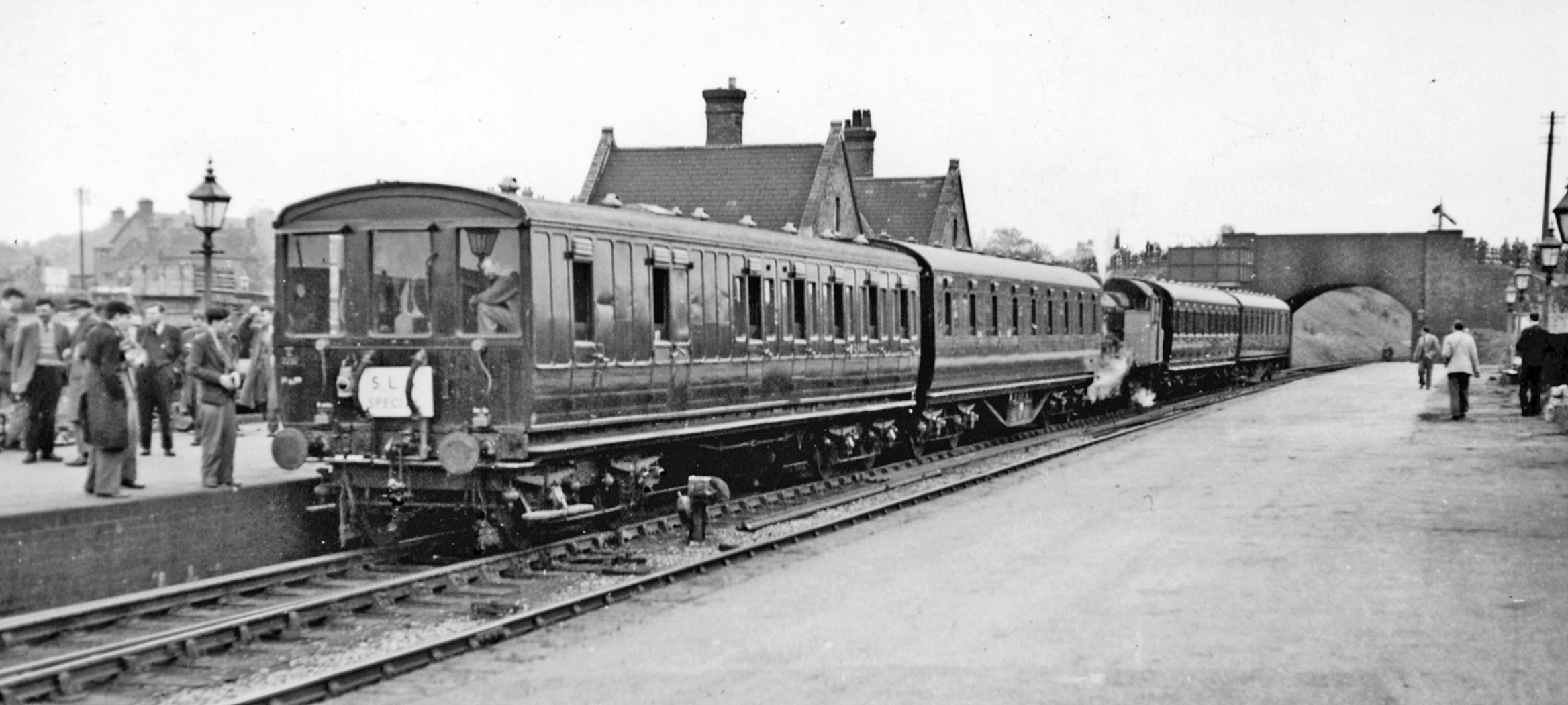
Aldridge station, with a Stephenson Locomotive Society special train, 1951

Aldridge railway station was on the Sutton Park Line running from Walsall to Birmingham via Sutton Coldfield. It also had a direct link to Wolverhampton on the now defunct Wolverhampton and Walsall Railway as well as a direct link to Brownhills via Walsall Wood although this closed in the 1960s. The station had passenger services to Walsall, Birmingham, Wolverhampton and Brownhills. It closed in 1966 and since then the line has been used only for freight. Ongoing speculation about returning passenger services to Aldridge, which would require a new station to be built, has continued with the apparent inclusion of Aldridge and Streetly stations on a map in the 2016 West Midlands Strategic Transport Plan. In February 2021, the West Midlands Combined Authority announced that the land needed for the station to be rebuilt had been acquired for £400,000.

== Sports, recreation and entertainment ==
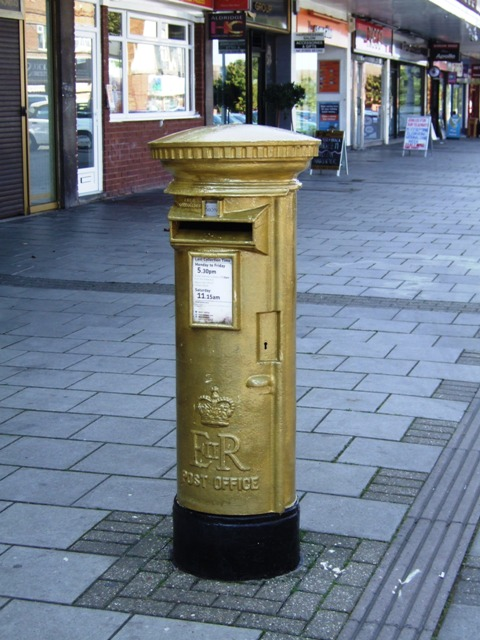
Gold postbox on the High Street, celebrating Ellie Simmonds' medal winning at the 2012 Summer Paralympics

Aldridge has a cricket and hockey club, the Stick and Wicket, located on the green behind the parish church, St. Mary's, and the Masonic Hall. Aldridge Hockey Club merged with Walsall Hockey Club in 2011 and was renamed Aldridge & Walsall Hockey Club.

Aldridge Sailing Club was formed in 1967 and is a Royal Yachting Association recognised centre based at the Swag pool, Stubbers Green.

Aldridge Rugby Football Club was formed in 1998 from an amalgamation of two established rugby clubs based in Birmingham: Witton and Old Centrals. The club is based on the former Old Centrals sports ground at Bourne Vale in Aldridge and the first team competes in Counties 3 Midlands West (North).

The Aldridge Youth Theatre was officially opened by the actor Bernard Hepton and is located on Noddy Park Road. It is run by a group of volunteers and puts on a variety of plays throughout the year. A pantomime is usually staged in January.

425 (Aldridge) Squadron, part of Staffordshire Wing of the Air Training Corps, was formed in 1941 and currently occupies a purpose-built HQ close to the village centre. The Squadron is run by uniformed RAFVR(T) officers and ATC SNCO adult staff, assisted by civilian instructors and a padre.

== Notable people ==
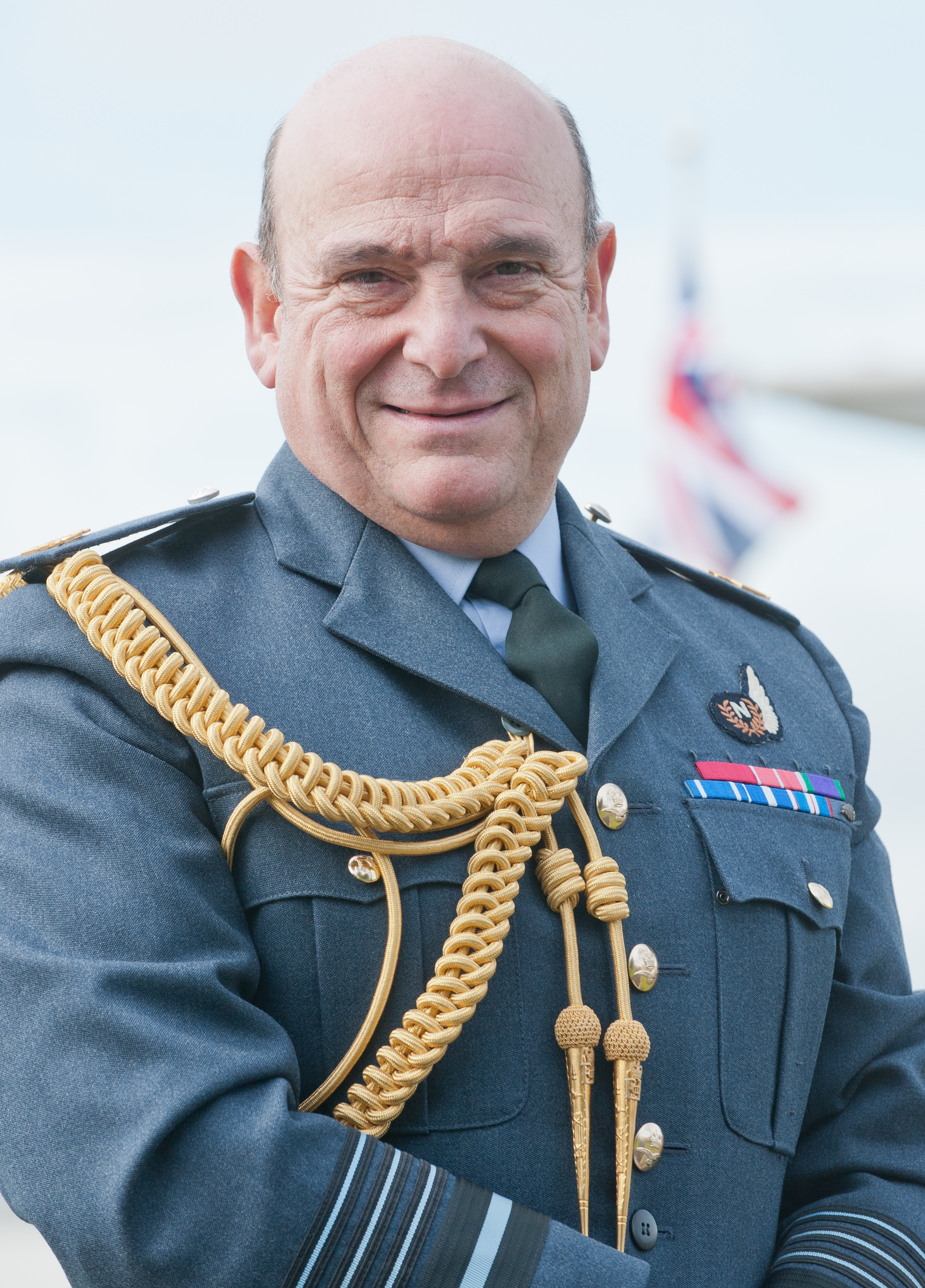
Stuart Peach, 2012

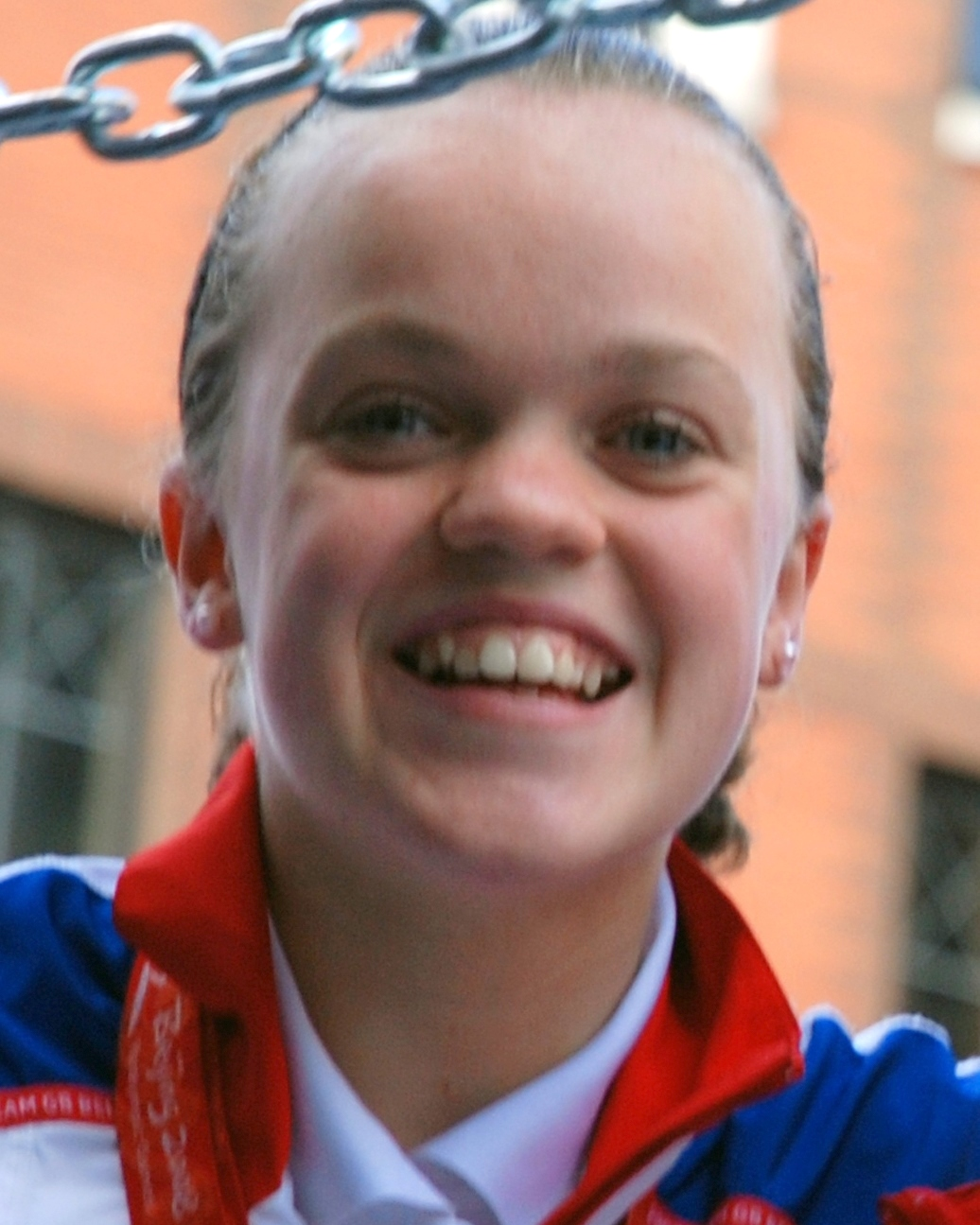
Ellie Simmonds, 2008

- Ellen Isabel Jones (ca. 1870s – 1946), an English suffragette, known as "Nell"
- Charles George Bonner (1884–1951), Royal Naval Reserve lieutenant, recipient of the Victoria Cross
- Isabel Dean (1918 – 1997), stage, film and TV actress.
- Ethel Lote (1920 – 2024), WWII nurse, yoga instructor, dental nurse and founder of the Dental Nurses Society.
- Richard Holmes (1946 – 2011), a British military historian.
- Air Chief Marshal Stuart Peach, Baron Peach (born 1956), retired senior Royal Air Force officer
- Richard Sinnott (born 1963), actor, writer and director.

=== Sport ===
- Vic Milne (1897–1971), footballer, played 266 games, including 156 for Aston Villa.
- Charles Holland (1908 – 1989), bicycle racer, one of the first two Britons to ride in Tour de France, team bronze medal at the 1932 Summer Olympics
- Alf Wood (1915 – 2001), football goalkeeper and manager, played 373 games, briefly managed Walsall
- Bob Chapman (born 1946), footballer who played over 460 games, including 359 for Notts Forest
- Lee Sinnott (born 1965), football manager and former player, played 527 games including 173 for Bradford City
- Colin Charvis (born 1972), former rugby union player, played over 350 games and 94 for Wales, went to the Redhouse School in Aldridge.
- Tom Davies (born 1990), known online as GeoWizard, adventurer, he crosses regions on foot as close to a straight line as possible; attended Aldridge School
- Ellie Simmonds (born 1994), attended Aldridge School, retired Paralympian swimmer, multiple gold medallist at the 2008, 2012 and 2016 Summer Paralympics.
