= Eric Whitman =

Welsh cricketer

Eric Ioan Emlyn Whitman (31 July 1909 — 5 December 1990) was a Welsh cricketer and teacher.

== Early life ==
Whitman was born in Barry, Glamorgan.

== Cricket ==
Whitman, who had taken up cricket in university, played club cricket for Barry Cricket Club. He was a right-handed batsman and a right-arm medium-pace bowler who played two first-class games for Glamorgan during the 1932 season, appearing in the lower order in both games.

== Military service ==
Whitman served as a Pilot Officer in the Royal Air Force during World War II, leaving the service on 27 June 1945.

== Teaching career ==
Following the end of his cricketing career, Whitman became a school teacher. By 1951 he was teaching at Bournemouth School. In 1958 he became the first headmaster of Aldridge Grammar School where he remained until his retirement in 1974.

== Marriage ==
Whitman married Madge Trowell in East Glamorgan in 1936.

== Death ==
Whitman died in Norwich, Norfolk on 5 December 1990, aged 81.
