= St Francis of Assisi Catholic College =

St. Francis of Assisi Catholic College
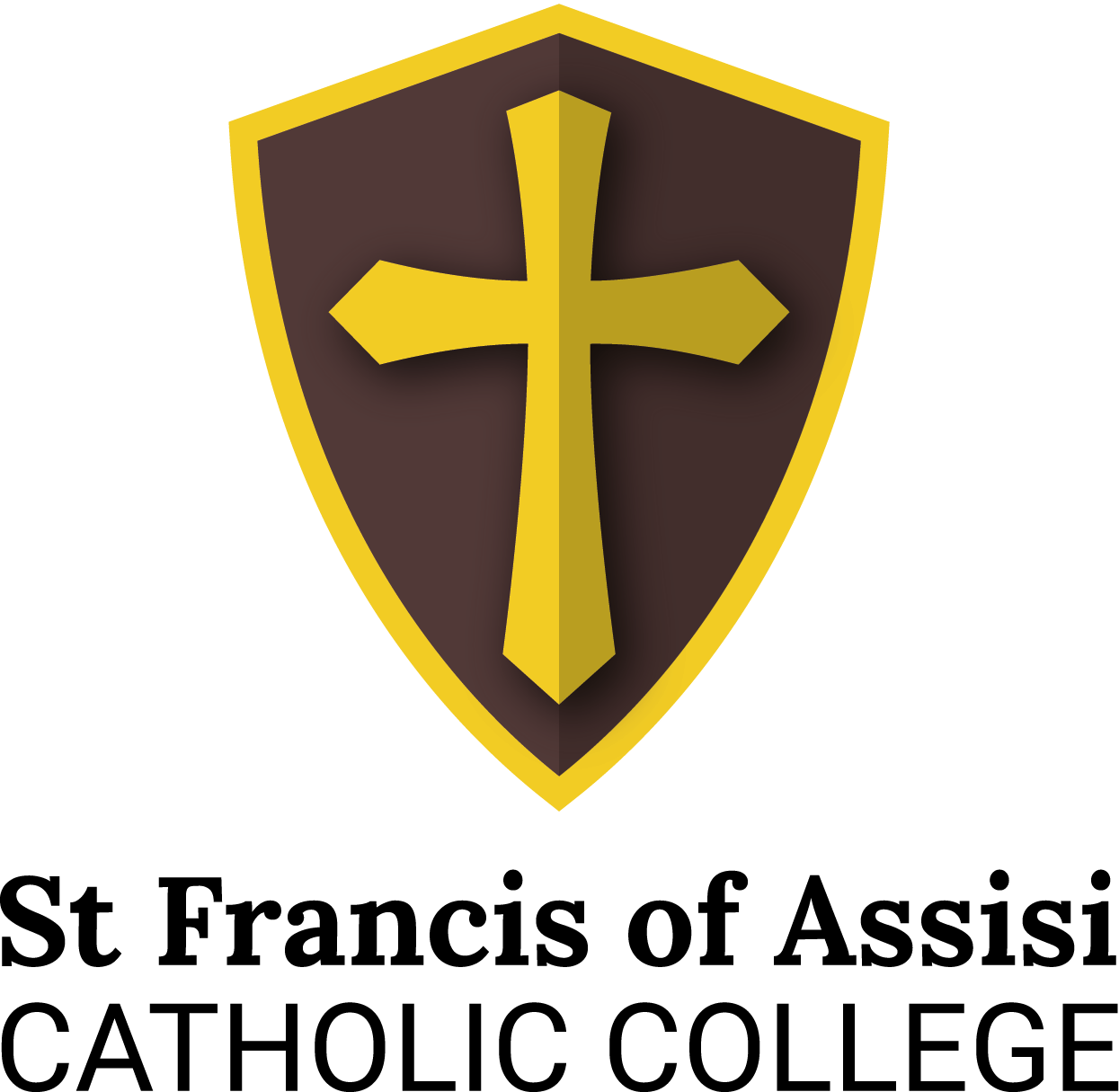

Location
- Erdington Road; Aldridge, Walsall, West Midlands, WS9 0RN; England; 52.5984°N 1.9120°W

Information
- Type: Voluntary Aided School
- Motto: Latin: nil satis optimum ("Only the best is good enough")
- Religious affiliation: Roman Catholic
- Local authority: Walsall
- Department for Education URN: 104255 Tables
- Ofsted: Reports
- Chair: Duncan Whitehouse
- Gender: Co-educational
- Age: 11 to 18
- Enrolment: 1038
- Website: www.stfrancis.cc

St. Francis of Assisi Catholic College is a mixed Roman Catholic secondary school in Walsall, England.

It was previously known as St Francis of Assisi RC School, until it was renamed St Francis of Assisi Catholic Technology College in September 2003 after gaining specialist status as a Technology College. With the ending of the specialist schools programme the school adopted its present name.

The school has approximately 1,100 pupils on roll of which around 110 attend the sixth form (years 12 and 13). Admission to the school is prioritised for baptised Catholic children from Catholic primary schools in Aldridge, Brownhills, Lichfield, Shelfield, Streetly, Tamworth, and Walsall.

== Charity events ==
The school hosts annual charity events, with the sixth form hosting a Breast Cancer Awareness Week raising funds for the charity. In December 2009 a pupil at the school organized a shoe box appeal for the Armed Forces of Great Britain. This was a success as it was the first year that the school had ever raised money or awareness for the S.O.S (Support our Soldiers) charity. The school supported the charity by creating over 100 care parcels and raised money for the soldiers at work around the world.

== Notable former pupils ==
- Dan Martin (b. 1989) road-racing cyclist.
