= Associated Electrical Industries =

British holding company

- Company type: Holding company
- Industry: Electrical engineering
- Founded: 1928
- Headquarters: England
- Parent: Telent

Associated Electrical Industries (AEI) was a British holding company formed in 1928 through the merger of British Thomson-Houston (BTH) and Metropolitan-Vickers electrical engineering companies. In 1967 AEI was acquired by GEC, to create the UK's largest industrial group. A scandal that followed the acquisition is said to have been instrumental in reforming accounting practices in the UK.

== Main subsidiaries ==
- Metropolitan-Vickers (Metrovick)
- British Thomson-Houston (BTH)
- Ferguson, Pailin & Co (switchgear)
- Edison Swan (lamps and radio valves)
- AEI Lamp and Lighting
- Siemens Brothers & Co (cables, telephone equipment and railway signaling apparatus)
- Hotpoint (domestic appliances)
- Premier Electric Heaters (incorporated into Hotpoint)
- W.T. Henley (cables, insulators and low voltage switchgear)
- Newton Victor (X-ray machines)
- Sunvic Controls (heating controls)
- Birlec (industrial electric furnaces)
- International Refrigerator Company
- Coldrator

== Takeover and restructuring ==
Rivalry existed between Metrovick and BTH brands in the Electrical Engineering field, resulting in internal competition and duplicated management. In 1959 AEI decided to remove those brands and consolidate both as AEI brands, resulting in internal problems and a fall in sales and market value. The abandonment of two well known trademarks and the replacement with the unfamiliar AEI branding lost the company significant work to competitors and resulted in a market weakening of the company.

These problems paved the way for a takeover in 1967 with the recently restructured General Electric Company (GEC) under Arnold Weinstock. The following year GEC merged with English Electric. GEC took over AEI Cables and Hackbridge Cables Co. in 1967, forming the company AEI Cables Ltd. in 1968.

GEC also went through substantial restructuring, including in 1989 forming GEC Alsthom and Cegelec Projects. GEC Alsthom was created from the GEC's Power and Transport businesses (originally AEI (previously BTH and Metrovick) and English Electric) and the French Compagnie Générale d'Electricité (CGE). The merger was to enable both companies a gain a greater export potential into Europe.

The GEC facilities in Rugby were split into GEC Alstom and Cegelec Projects, but in 1998 the two companies were reunited under the Alstom banner.

An issue relevant to UK employment and insolvency law arose in 2011, when there was a steep increase in the price of copper; AEI Cables Lid. experienced difficult trading conditions and declared itself insolvent. Considering making some staff redundant, they were challenged in the Employment Tribunal for failing to comply with the requirement for 90 days of consultation under TUPE law (section 188 of the Trade Union and Labour Relations (Consolidation) Act 1992). The Employment Appeal Tribunal ruled that it was not reasonable to expect an insolvent employer to continue trading for 90 days in order to accommodate this legal requirement and in these particular circumstances ruled that 60 days was sufficient.

== Arms ==
Coat of arms of Associated Electrical Industries

Notes
Granted 1 December 1944.
Crest
On a wreath of the colours a dexter hand Proper grasping a thunderbolt Or fired also Proper.
Escutcheon
Argent three escutcheons Azure each charged with a thunderbolt Or fired Proper.
Supporters
On the dexter side an heraldic antelope Argent attired and collared pendent from the collar by a chain an escutcheon Or charged with a rose Gules barbed and seeded Proper and on the sinister a lion Argent collared, pendent from the collar by a chain Or an escutcheon azure charged with eight arrows in saltire banded Argent.
