= The Parole Officer =

2001 British comedy film by John Duigan

- Theatrical release poster, featuring supposed quotations from other Coogan comedy characters.
- Directed by: John Duigan
- Written by: Steve Coogan; Henry Normal
- Produced by: Duncan Kenworthy; Andrew Macdonald
- Starring: Steve Coogan; Om Puri; Steven Waddington; Ben Miller; Emma Williams; Brad Sewell
- Cinematography: John Daly
- Edited by: David Freeman
- Music by: Alex Heffes
- Production companies: DNA Films; Film Council; Figment Films; Toledo Pictures
- Distributed by: Universal Pictures International (through United International Pictures)
- Release date: 10 August 2001
- Running time: 93 minutes
- Country: United Kingdom
- Language: English
- Budget: £6 million

The Parole Officer is a 2001 British comedy heist film, written by and starring Steve Coogan, directed by John Duigan, and produced by DNA Films. The film also stars Lena Headey, Stephen Dillane, Om Puri, Steven Waddington, Ben Miller, Emma Williams, and Omar Sharif. The plot revolves around a probation officer framed for murder, who seeks to prove his own innocence by breaking into a bank containing vital evidence against the real culprit, with the aid of a diverse group of former criminals he once paroled.

The film received mixed reviews from critics who, while comparing the film to the early British crime caper films of the 1950s and 60s despite the adult humour involved, were divided over Coogan's performance, the level of comedy, and the audience it catered to.

== Plot ==
Simon Garden, a well-meaning but ineffectual probation officer who suffers from hypoglycemia, is transferred to Manchester, where he develops romantic feelings for an attractive WPC, Emma. Following a police pursuit, Kirsty, a young juvenile delinquent, crashes her car and is rescued by Detective Inspector Burton, who then charges her with concealing Class A drugs in a toy. After Kirsty protests her innocence about the drugs, Simon, handling her case, becomes suspicious of Burton when he notices the toy in his possession. Later that evening, after following him to a nightclub, Simon finds Burton is corrupt, after he murders an accountant who threatened to expose his involvement in the drug trade. Accidentally being discovered, he flees the scene, but drops his wallet in the process.

The next day, Simon finds Burton in charge of the murder investigation, who threatens to frame him for the murder unless he remains quiet about what he witnessed. Disheartened, Simon makes plans to leave Manchester. However, upon witnessing Burton being interviewed on television, Simon realizes the nightclub's CCTV cameras filmed the murder. Upon learning the CCTV tape containing the evidence was deposited into the West Clyde Bank by the nightclub's owner, Simon recruits help for a bank heist from three of his only successful cases back in Blackpool: George, who became a safety inspector; Jeff, who became a fishmonger; and Colin, a computer salesman. After the group discover Kirsty trying to steal a television, they reluctantly let her join upon her offering to help them out.

For the heist, Colin devises a computer virus to trigger every security alarm in the city, and a robot designed to disable the bank vault's time lock; the latter planted inside the vault, and capturing on film a vault code used by a staff member. For the getaway, Simon and the group convince a group of cycling activists to hold a protest around the time of the heist to create a traffic gridlock to compound any police pursuit. As they training for the heist together, the group slowly bond and become close friends. However, when Emma questions Burton about the accountant's murder, after Simon reveals to her what he witnessed, Simon's house is raided by the police. Simon is shocked when the accountant's severed head is found in his kitchen, leading to the group being arrested for murder.

Kirsty manages to escape and rescues the others, as they convince Simon to go ahead with the heist despite the situation they are in. Reaching the bank, the group break-in and overcome the security measures, but find the bank code doesn't work. They are shocked when a disguised Victor, who faked his death, reveals the code won't work while the alarm is active, leading them to wait until it deactivates before they finally gain entry into the vault. Once inside, Simon recovers the CCTV tape, but is shocked when the others steal a shoulder bag of cash that Burton received for his corrupt activities. Despite this, the group flee from the bank as the police arrive to stop them, escaping with bicycles as the cyclist protest gridlocks the city centre.

Simon crashes Burton’s award ceremony at Manchester City Hall to expose him, but Burton’s henchmen intercept him and seize the incriminating tape. Although Emma arrests Simon, she surprises him by revealing she believes he is innocent. She helps him stage a fake hostage situation so he can use the stolen money to expose Burton’s crimes to the audience. When Burton remains unfazed, Victor suddenly appears disguised as a police officer. Having retrieved the tape from Burton's men, Victor plays it for the crowd. Realizing he is caught, Burton tries to flee but is arrested alongside his henchmen. As the crowd celebrates Simon's heroism, Simon and Emma share a kiss, unaware that Victor is quietly slipping away with the stolen cash.

== Cast ==
- Steve Coogan as Simon Garden
- Lena Headey as Emma
- Om Puri as George
- Steven Waddington as Jeff
- Ben Miller as Colin
- Emma Williams as Kirsty
- Stephen Dillane as Inspector Burton
- Omar Sharif as Victor
- Jenny Agutter as Sarah, Victor's wife
- John Henshaw as Cochran
- Simon Pegg as Deflated Husband
- Julia Davis as Insinuating Wife
- Justin Burrows as Mills
- Clive Kneller as Deacon
- Buster Reeves as First Seedman
- Brian Nickels as Second Seedman
- Mad Ray as Local Buffoon
- Brad Sewell as Dancing Boy
- Jake Abraham as Seedy Bloke
- Richard Sinnott as Bank Manager
- Olga Grahame as Jeff's Mam
- Jo-Anne Knowles as TV Interviewer
- Ty Glaser as police officer
- Peter Armitage as Chief Constable
- Iain McKee as Second Policeman
- Bernard Wrigley as Bike Group Leader
- Togo Igawa as Japanese Businessman
- Hazel Douglas as Old Lady in Art Gallery
- Peter Martin as Tom

== Production ==
Despite the film being set in Manchester, some of the filming took place in nearby Liverpool. Notably, the bank in the film where the heist takes place is the former Bank of England building on Castle Street.

== Reception ==
On Rotten Tomatoes the film has an approval rating of 57% based on reviews from 7 critics. Most reviews favourably compared the film to Ealing Studios' heist comedies of the 1950s and 60s, although noted aspects of vulgarity.

For example, Philip French, writing in The Observer stated "The film is mildly amusing and more than competently acted [but] contains very little that's original and nothing that throws any light on contemporary life. Indeed, all that distinguishes Coogan's film from British heist pictures of the 1950s and 1960s is the vulgarity and excursions into grossness." Similarly, Neil Smith, writing for BBC Movies online noted "What follows mixes the light-hearted antics of The Lavender Hill Mob with such high-brow gags as Simon chundering on a roller-coaster or disposing of a phallus sculpture in a ladies' loo."

Derek Elley, writing the Variety was also complimentary, noting "Though much of the film revolves round the persona of Coogan...overall it's more of an ensemble piece than a one-man showcase, and better for it."

Steve Coogan said, "Whenever I think of The Parole Officer, I squirm. And when someone says they like it, I think, "Really, why?" I'm pleased that they like it, but it's like a children's film."

The film grossed £3.4 million in the United Kingdom.
