= As the crow flies =

Idiom meaning the shortest distance between two points

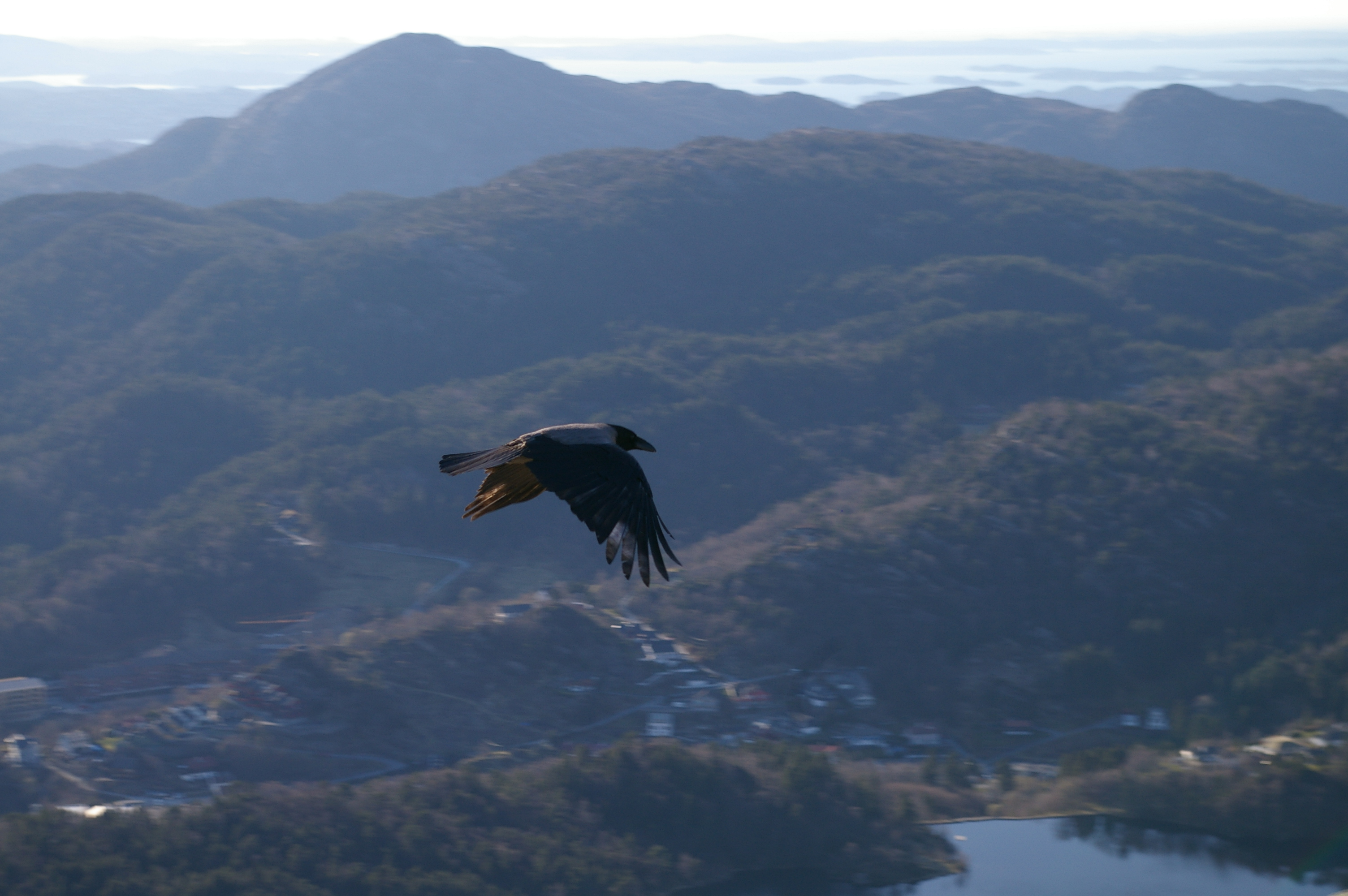
A crow flying across the terrain

The expression as the crow flies is an idiom for the most direct path between two points.

== Etymology ==
The meaning of the expression is attested from the early 19th century, and appeared in the Charles Dickens novel Oliver Twist (1838):

"We cut over the fields at the back with him between us – straight as the crow flies – through hedge and ditch."

While crows do conspicuously fly alone across open country, they do not fly in especially straight lines. Though they do not swoop in the air like swallows or starlings, crows often circle above their nests.

One suggested origin of the term is that before modern navigational methods were introduced, cages of crows were kept upon ships and a bird would be released from the crow's nest when required to assist navigation, in the hope that it would fly directly towards land. However, the earliest recorded uses of the term are not nautical in nature, and the crow's nest of a ship is thought to derive from its shape and position rather than its use as a platform for releasing crows. It has also been suggested that crows would not travel well in cages, as they fight if confined.

== See also ==
- Displacement (geometry)
- Distance
- Geodesic
- Great-circle distance
- Straight line mission

== Bibliography ==
- Dundes, Alan (2004). "As the Crow Flies: A Straightforward Study of Lineal Worldview in American Folk Speech". In Lau, Kimberley J.; et al. (eds.). What Goes Around Comes Around: The Circulation of Proverbs in Contemporary Life. Utah State University Press. pp. 171–187. ISBN 978-0-87421-592-2.
- Winfield, Charles H. (1882). Adjudged Words and Phrases: Being a Collection of Adjudicated Definitions of Terms Used in the Law, with References to Authorities. Jersey City, NJ: J.J. Griffiths. p. 45. OCLC 3364516. "as the crow flies."
