= Ellen Isabel Jones =

English suffragette

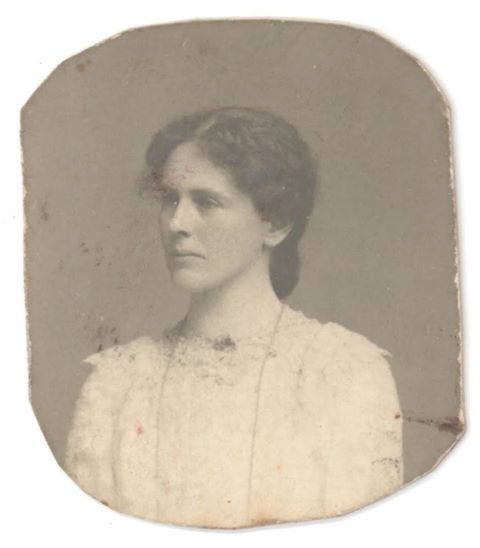
Ellen Isabel Jones as a young woman (undated, probably 1890s)

Ellen Isabel Jones (born Ellen Isabel Cotton; c. 1870s – 1946) was an English suffragette. Ellen, known as "Nell", was a close associate of Emmeline Pankhurst and Christabel Pankhurst, leaders of the Suffragette movement. She was also an acquaintance of Madame Yevonde, a photographer associated with the Suffragettes and who shared a building with them in Victoria, London.

Her husband, Dr. Ernest Williams Jones (1878 — 14 December 1922, Aldridge), was a supporter of her cause and made speeches in its favour — unusual in a time when men could be sacked for showing support for women's rights.

== Suffragette ==
Nell was born in Penkridge, Staffordshire. In May 1914, Emmeline Pankhurst invited her to Belgravia to throw stones at the windows of the grand houses of the powerful, ruling class, who were opposed to the demands for women's suffrage. Jones knew in advance that she was likely to be arrested and even force-fed.

Jones was duly arrested and, as she wrote in her letter from prison, "had never been so relieved to be fall into the arms of a man when the Bobby arrested me". She was hauled off to the Bow Street Magistrates' Court where she was found guilty and sentenced to a term in prison.

When arrested and sentenced, she didn't give her name and was sent to Holloway Prison. In Holloway jail, Jones did five days of "hunger and thirst" strike in protest at the inequities of women not being allowed to vote. Many suffragettes, including Mrs Pankhurst, were force fed. There is no evidence of Ellen Jones being force fed but in the face of many women responding to their incarceration with this dramatic protest, to avoid the embarrassment of 'gentle women' dying for their cause, they were released.

Nell had become very weak due to her hunger & thirst strike and was sent to a nursing home under the "Cat and Mouse" Act to get better, after which she was expected to report back. However she escaped back to Aldridge and to ensure her safe return, her husband was told not to meet her so instead she was met by a family friend "Bernard" on a motorbike who drove her home in his sidecar.

Jones had been given a Hunger Strike Medal 'for Valour' by WSPU.

She spent the remaining 34 years of her life on the run. She died in Bedford.

Details of these events are held in an archive of her papers at The Women's Library in London.

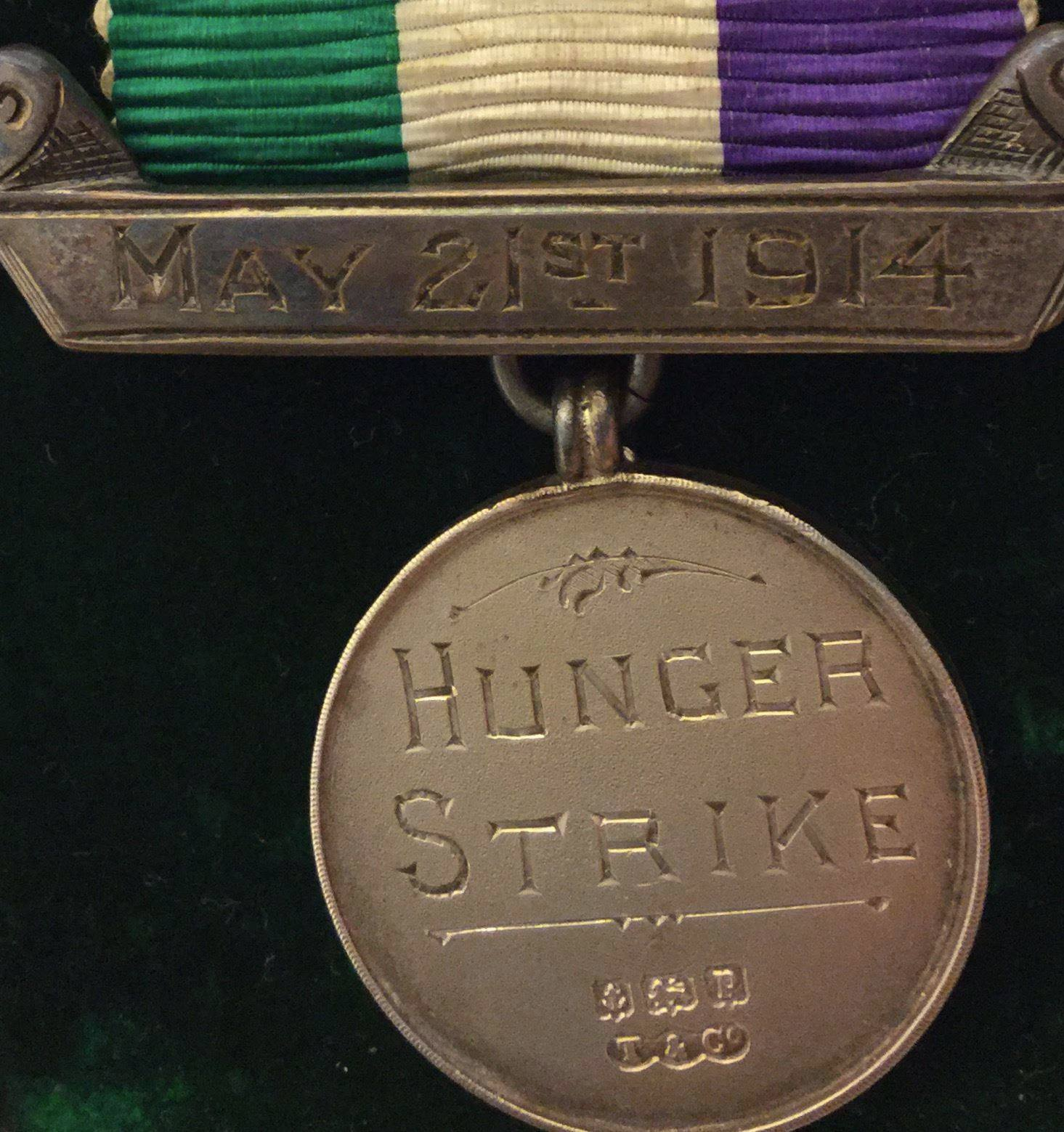
Ellen Isabel Jones' Hunger Strike Medal, awarded 21 May 1914

This collection is now owned by the London School of Economics, which stands on the site formerly occupied by the WSPU.

These events were also told on two BBC News broadcasts on 6 February 2018, the 100th anniversary of women's suffrage, on BBC News 24 and BBC Midlands Today.

== Personal life ==
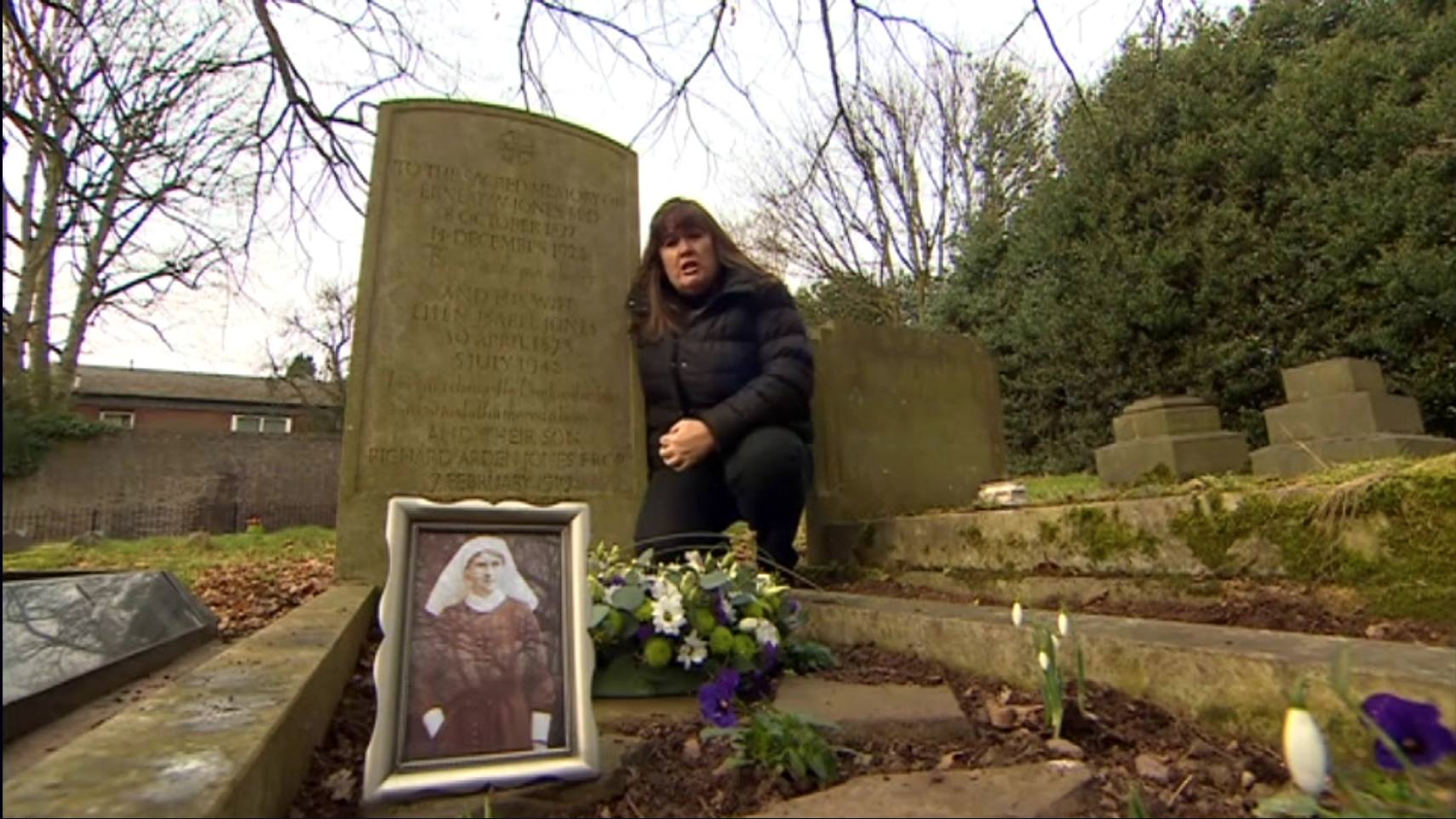
Ellen Isabel Jones' resting place on 8 February 2018.

Ellen was married to Dr Ernest Williams Jones, M.D. of Aldridge, Staffordshire, the first General Practitioner to receive the M.D. degree., with whom she had four boys.

In World War I, vast numbers of soldiers, wounded in the Somme, Passchendale, Ypres or other devastating battles, were brought back to England in need of medical aid. Dr Jones and Ellen, a nurse, gave their house over to become the Aldridge Auxiliary Hospital to care for convalescent soldiers recovering from their wounds.

Dr Jones was an early disciple of Freudian psychoanalysis and, by chance, a great friend of his namesake, Freud's biographer, another Ernest Jones. He died in 1922 from pneumonia, whereafter she moved to The Spinney, Rottingdean to raise her boys on the South Coast with help from income from Paying Guests. With antisemitism common in the 1930s, the house became known for welcoming Jewish guests and had many guests from Vienna, Austria.

Ellen's father, Thomas Cotton (of Penkridge), was a lock keeper.

== Publicity ==
On 6 February 2018, the 100th anniversary of Women's Suffrage, her story was for the first time made public. Locally an event was organised by Aldridge School on the Centenary of Women's Suffrage, consisting of a visit to her resting place and a speech given by local historians. This was televised on BBC.
