= Richard Sinnott =

British actor

- Born: Richard Sinnott; 5 June 1963 (age 62); Aldridge, Staffordshire, England, UK

Richard Sinnott (born 5 June 1963) is a professional actor, writer and director based in Manchester.

He has played over forty credited roles in British television series such as Coronation Street, Life on Mars and The Street, and films such as The Parole Officer. He teaches beginners' acting classes in Manchester and is a freelance Performing Arts lecturer at the University of Salford. He is the author of the theatre play Laid Upon A Pebble-Bed.

Sinnott was born in Aldridge, Staffordshire. His brother is the Altrincham football club manager Lee Sinnott, who was Watford's centre-half in the 1984 FA Cup Final.
