= National Centre for Learning Welsh =

Educational organisation to support the Welsh language

- Y Ganolfan Dysgu Cymraeg Genedlaethol (Welsh)
- Formation: 2016; 10 years ago
- Founder: Welsh Government
- Type: Educational organisation
- Purpose: Welsh-language learning; Welsh-medium education
- Headquarters: Carmarthen, Wales
- Fields: Minority language movement
- Chief executive: Dona Lewis
- Website: learnwelsh.cymru

The National Centre for Learning Welsh (Welsh: Y Ganolfan Dysgu Cymraeg Genedlaethol) is an organisation which co-ordinates standardised Welsh language classes throughout Wales and globally. It was set up in 2016 to promote learning Welsh among the adult population and it is funded by the Welsh Government as part of their goal to reach 1 million speakers of the Welsh language by 2050. Estyn reported that the programme is "a cornerstone of workplace language planning initiatives" and has praised its impact on bilingualism in Wales.

It currently offers courses are Entry (Mynediad), Foundation (Sylfaen) Intermediate (Canolradd), High (Uwch) and Gloywi (Proficient) speakers. Levels broadly follow the Common European Framework of Reference for Languages. The courses are delivered by a group of ten national local providers:

- Learn Welsh Cardiff, through Cardiff University.
- Learn Welsh Swansea Bay, through Swansea University.
- Learn Welsh The Vale, for the Vale of Glamorgan through Aberystwyth University.
- Learn Welsh Glamorgan for residents of Bridgend, Rhondda Cynon Taf and Merthyr Tydfil through The University of South Wales.
- Learn Welsh Gwent for residents of Caerphilly, Torfaen, Newport, Blaenau Gwent and Monmouthshire through Coleg Gwent.
- Learn Welsh Pembrokeshire.
- Learn Welsh Ceredigion, Carmarthenshire and Powys through Aberystwyth University.
- Learn Welsh Northeast, covering Flintshire, Denbighshire and Wrexham through Coleg Cambria.
- Learn Welsh Northwest, covering Gwynedd, Anglesey and Conwy through Bangor University.
- Nant Gwrtheyrn, an immersion centre in North West Wales.

18,330 people completed courses with the centre in 2023-2024 which was a 45% increase on the 2016 numbers. From 2022, courses have been free for 16-25 year olds and teachers. The centre has also collaborated with Duolingo to increase the numbers of people learning Welsh and to reach the government's target of 1 million speakers by 2050.. It also offers tailored lessons for refugees and asylum seekers to learn Welsh. Since 2025, it has collaborated with the UK government to make Welsh-language courses available to all British civil servants.
