= GeoWizard =

British YouTuber (born 1990)

- GeoWizard channel logo
- Born: Thomas George Davies; 22 September 1990 (age 36)
- Occupation: YouTuber

YouTube information
- Channel: GeoWizard
- Years active: 2015–present
- Genres: Geography trivia; wilderness adventure
- Subscribers: 1.48 million
- Views: 267.96 million
- Last updated: 7 October 2026
- Website: officialgeowizardstore.com

Thomas George Davies (born 22 September 1990), known online as GeoWizard, is a British YouTuber and adventurer known for his skill in playing the internet geography game GeoGuessr and his "straight line mission" adventures, in which he attempts to cross regions on foot in as close to a straight line as possible.

== Early life ==
Thomas George Davies was born on 22 September 1990. He grew up in Aldridge, West Midlands, England.

== Career Before YouTube ==
Davies held a number of jobs before becoming successful on YouTube, including as a fishmonger, van driver, and bartender.

=== GeoWizzard ===
Davies registered his YouTube channel, "GeoWizard", on 15 May 2015, building it around the game GeoGuessr, a browser game in which the player must identify locations in Google Street View. As of October 2026, Davies has over 1.48 million subscribers and over 267 million views across all his public videos. In 2021, Davies launched the Geo Detective series, where he attempts to identify the location of photographs sent in by viewers, which led to a 2024 collaboration with Fujifilm for the MyFujifilm Memories Recreated Campaign.

=== Straight line missions ===
External videos
- Mission Across Wales - Attempt 1 (2019). GeoWizard
- Mission Across Wales - Attempt 2 (2020). GeoWizard
- Mission Across Wales - Attempt 3 (2021). GeoWizard
- Mission Across Wales - Attempt 4 (2023). GeoWizard

Davies undertakes straight line missions, in which he uses a GPS device to attempt to cross a geographic area in a straight line. His first attempt, in 2019, was to cross Wales. Bad weather and steeper terrain than expected resulted in failure 9 mi (14 km) from the coast. In 2020, during the COVID-19 pandemic in the United Kingdom, Davies and his friend Greg attempted to cross Wales, but the effort was aborted midway for health reasons. Later in 2020, Davies successfully crossed Norway in a straight line. In early 2021, Davies and Greg attempted to cross Scotland but failed when they were caught by police for breaking local COVID-19 guidelines. Their video was criticized for showing them crossing a live railway line, and Davies edited that scene out of the video following a visit from the British Transport Police. In October 2021, Davies and his brother Ben attempted to cross Wales for a third time. The pair managed to complete the crossing, but a GPS battery malfunction on day three caused them to temporarily leave the line, making it non-continuous. Davies pursued a fourth crossing of Wales in late January and early February 2023, which proved a success. He later noted that one of his main motivations for attempting it once more was due to competition, notably from Adam and Archie Fieldhouse, fellow straight-line adventurers who had successfully crossed Scotland, a feat that Davies was unable to do. The Fieldhouses would also act as a major motivation for Davies' straight-line mission across England in late January to early February 2024.

=== No roads missions ===
In April 2022, Davies premiered a new type of adventure, called the "No Roads Mission", where he attempts to cross an urban area without walking down roads. His first mission was across the Black Country and resulted in a success. In June 2023, he embarked on a mission in which he, along with his brother Ben, attempted to cross Birmingham without using roads or the city's canal network. In April 2025, Davies succeeded in a "no roads mission" across Greater London. In 2026, Davies carried out a no roads mission in Manchester.

=== Other missions and adventures ===
In August 2022, Davies and a small support crew including Russ Cook dribbled a football across the width of Britain along Hadrian's Wall Path in a continuous run. Starting on the west coast, they walked and jogged the 73-mile (117 km) route in approximately 23 hours, stopping only for brief periods for food and water. Davies was the only member of the team to touch the football, making no hand contact with it at any point and becoming the first person to achieve this feat. The event was recorded and named "Dribbling Britain" and raised £70,000 for charities supporting efforts to end youth homelessness, improve men's mental health, and reduce youth violence. Later that year, Davies—along with friends Ben Cook and Adam Cook—ran across Wales from the border with England, near Anchor, to the coast at Aberystwyth, in under fourteen hours. Parts of the route were covered by more than one foot (0.30 m) of snow, with temperatures reaching −9 °C (16 °F).

In December 2023, Davies and fellow straight-line mission YouTubers Adam and Archie Fieldhouse raced each other across the Isle of Man, in the channel's first "straight line race", which was won by the Fieldhouse team.

=== How Not to Travel ===
In his series How Not to Travel, Davies and Greg embark on long journeys with little planning and the intent of using as many methods of transport as possible, such as hitchhiking, cycling, kayaking, or scootering. This series currently has two seasons: How Not to Travel Europe (2019–2020), documenting a journey from Geneva, Switzerland to Bratislava, Slovakia; and How Not to Travel America (2022–2023), covering a trip down the East Coast of the United States from Boston to Miami.

=== Tenner in My Pocket ===
In his series Tenner in My Pocket, Davies sets out on adventures with £10 and few other supplies, without much direction or plan. The videos include rough sleeping, foraging for food and water, and reliance on the area's locals to keep the challenge going. Starting on foot, in the first series, he sets out from his home in Lichfield and travels north. In the second series, he begins in Plymouth and journeys down Cornwall's South West Coast Path. The third series is the first outside of England, with Davies walking east from Salzburg, Austria.

== Music ==
Davies has composed music under the name Amynedd, which he used to underscore his videos. In 2020, he released the album 16-Bit Adventure. In 2025, he released the dream pop album Pleasant Pudding under the name Flopsy's Dream.

=== Discography ===
Studio albums

- Amynedd – 16-Bit Adventure (2020)
- Flopsy's Dream – Pleasant Pudding (2025)

== Personal life ==
Davies resides in Lichfield, Staffordshire and is married to Verity, who has appeared in his videos and acted as support crew for his straight line missions. The couple have two daughters together, with their first being born in 2024 and the second in 2026. Davies has a brother named Ben, and an Uncle named Ed, both of which have appeared in videos acting as support crew or accomplices.
