= Straight line mission =

Type of outdoor adventure challenge

A straight line mission is an outdoor recreational activity where participants attempt to cross an area in a completely straight line, typically on foot. Straight line missions have been popularised by British YouTuber Tom Davies (GeoWizard) who has attempted a number of ambitious straight line missions and documented them on his YouTube channel. These videos have inspired others to attempt similar missions.

Another similar challenge is Beeline Britain, where participants travel (using kayaks, bikes and on foot) from Land's End to John o' Groats in a straight line. This was first completed in 2014 by a four person team.

Straight line missions also have some similarity to parkour, where practitioners attempt to get from one point to another in the fastest and most efficient way possible, though are usually attempted over much longer distances across non-urban environments. Well known parkour practitioners Storror have attempted straight line missions. Walking in a straight line following a specified compass bearing is also a commonly required skill in wilderness navigation. The revolutionary organisation the Situationist International suggested walking in a straight line as a potentially revolutionary act though most straight line missions are attempted for recreational or entertainment purposes. The artist Richard Long completed a straight line mission across Dartmoor the map of which is held in the MoMA collection.

== History ==
Between 800BCE and 100BCE, Paracas culture in Palpa province created straight line geoglyphs in what is now Peru. Also in Peru, between 500BCE and 500CE some eight hundred straight Nazca lines were later created for purposes including astronomy, the longest was around 9 miles. In 2018 researchers identified the longest possible straight line sailing between Pakistan and Russia.

== Criteria ==
Straight line missions can be planned using software such as Google Earth and tracked using a GPS device. Mapping the line on software such as Google Earth ensures the line is a great circle and does not depend on the map projection.

Straight line missions are scored according to a number of criteria based on the largest deviation from the planned route. With max deviations less than a certain amount achieving the following grades:

- 10m - Diamond
- 25m - Platinum
- 50m - Gold
- 75m - Silver
- 100m - Bronze

A total score (Burdell score) can also be computed for the entire line.

== Notable Missions ==
=== Straight line across England ===
At the end of the 20th century, a north-south crossing of England in a straight line was achieved by geographer Nicholas Crane, though using a much less stringent boundary of 1km either side of the line.

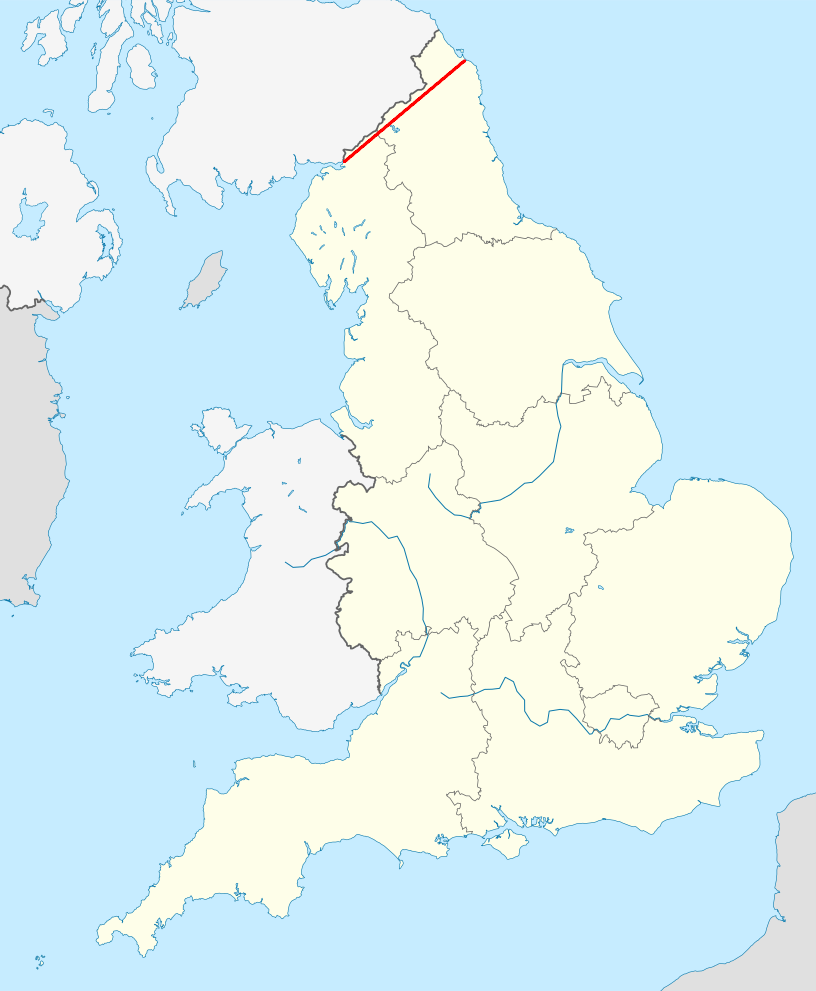
Mouth of the River Esk near Gretna (left) to Bamburgh, Northumbria

The first east-west crossing of England in a straight line was accomplished in 2024 by GeoWizard on a route going from near Gretna, Dumfries and Galloway to Bamburgh, Northumbria.

=== Straight line across Scotland ===
The first crossing of Scotland in a straight line was achieved in 2022 by Adam and Archie Fieldhouse. The longest straight line mission at the time, 49 miles, was completed in the Cairngorms National Park from the Pass of Drumochter to Corgarff..

=== Straight line across Wales ===
External videos
- Mission Across Wales - Attempt 1 (2019). GeoWizard
- Mission Across Wales - Attempt 2 (2020). GeoWizard
- Mission Across Wales - Attempt 3 (2021). GeoWizard
- Mission Across Wales - Attempt 4 (2023). GeoWizard

The first crossing of Wales in a straight line was accomplished in 2023 by GeoWizard on the fourth attempt a feat which received national media coverage. The line was 42-miles long from Craignant, Shropshire, to Tal-y-bont, near Barmouth, in Gwynedd.

=== Straight line across Latvia ===
The first crossing of Latvia in a straight line was completed in October 2024 by an Estonian couple, Iti-Jantra Erikso (Note: Credited under her maiden name, Iti-Jantra Metsamaa, in coverage of the Latvia and Estonia missions.) and Toomas Erikso. The mission received national media coverage in Latvia. The route began at the Lithuania-Latvia border and ended at the Gulf of Riga, totalling 75.4 kilometres.

=== Straight line across Estonia ===
The first crossing of Estonia in a straight line was completed in April 2025 also by Iti-Jantra Erikso and Toomas Erikso. The line began at the Estonia-Latvia border and ended in Vainupea beach, on the north coast of Estonia, totalling 176 kilometres. The mission received media coverage in The Baltic Guide tourism newspaper.

=== Longest possible straight line ===
The longest possible overland straight line mission goes from Portugal to China over a distance of 11,241 km.

== Popularity ==
Due to the popularisation of the idea by GeoWizard a number of others have attempted straight line missions across different countries such as Scotland and New Zealand. Other attempts focus on lines of the longest possible distance, use different modes of travel or are simply recreational.

== See also ==
- Adventure travel
- As the crow flies
- Dérive
- GeoWizard
- List of longest walks
- Parkour
- Off-trail hiking
- Orienteering
- Urban exploration
